= Ice hockey at the 1964 Winter Olympics – Rosters =

The ice hockey team rosters at the 1964 Winter Olympics consisted of the following players:

== Austria ==
Head coach: (Czechoslovakia) Zdenek Ujcik

No.	Pos.	Name	Height	Weight	Birthdate	Team
-	D	Adolf Bachura	-	-	April 10, 1933 (aged 30)	N/A
-	F	Adolf Bachler	5 ft 10 in (178 cm)	187 lb (85 kg)	April 29, 1938 (aged 25)	N/A
-	F	Horst Kakl	-	-	January 6, 1942 (aged 22)	N/A
-	F	Dieter Kalt Sr.	-	-	July 29, 1941 (aged 22)	N/A
-	F	Christian Kirchberger	-	-	January 20, 1944 (aged 20)	(Austria) Wiener EV
-	D	Hermann Knoll	6 ft 3 in (191 cm)	-	December 10, 1931 (aged 32)	N/A
-	D	Eduard Mössmer	-	-	February 21, 1934 (aged 29)	N/A
-	-	Tassilo Neuwirth	-	-	December 15, 1940 (aged 23)	N/A
-	G	Alfred Püls	5 ft 10 in (178 cm)	168 lb (76 kg)	August 12, 1933 (aged 30)	N/A
-	F	Sepp Puschnig	5 ft 10 in (178 cm)	196 lb (89 kg)	September 12, 1946 (aged 17)	N/A
-	F	Erich Romauch	5 ft 7 in (170 cm)	148 lb (67 kg)	July 18, 1939 (aged 24)	N/A
-	F	Fritz Spielmann	-	-	March 26, 1933 (aged 30)	N/A
-	F	Adelbert St. John	5 ft 7 in (170 cm)	154 lb (70 kg)	October 6, 1931 (aged 32)	N/A
-	F	Gustav Tischer	-	-	December 10, 1932 (aged 31)	N/A
-	G	Friedrich Turek	-	-	June 24, 1940 (aged 23)	N/A
-	F	Fritz Wechselberger	-	-	September 9, 1938 (aged 25)	N/A
-	D	Erich Winkler	-	-	February 17, 1935 (aged 28)	N/A
-	F	Walter Znenahlik (C)	5 ft 6 in (168 cm)	176 lb (80 kg)	January 2, 1935 (aged 29)	N/A

== Canada ==
Head coach: David Bauer

No.	Pos.	Name	Height	Weight	Birthdate	Team
1	G	Ken Broderick	5 ft 10 in (178 cm)	161 lb (73 kg)	February 16, 1942 (aged 21)	N/A
1	G	Seth Martin	5 ft 10 in (178 cm)	181 lb (82 kg)	May 4, 1933 (aged 30)	(Canada) Rossland Warriors
2	D	Terry O'Malley	6 ft 0 in (183 cm)	181 lb (82 kg)	October 21, 1940 (aged 23)	N/A
3	D	Rod Seiling	6 ft 0 in (183 cm)	183 lb (83 kg)	November 14, 1944 (aged 19)	(Canada) Toronto Marlboros
4	D	Barry MacKenzie	6 ft 0 in (183 cm)	190 lb (86 kg)	August 16, 1941 (aged 22)	N/A
6	D/F	Henry Åkervall (C)	5 ft 11 in (180 cm)	181 lb (82 kg)	August 24, 1937 (aged 26)	(Canada) Port Arthur Bearcats
8	F	Roger Bourbonnais	5 ft 9 in (175 cm)	163 lb (74 kg)	October 26, 1942 (aged 21)	N/A
9	F	Gary Dineen	5 ft 10 in (178 cm)	174 lb (79 kg)	December 24, 1943 (aged 20)	N/A
10	D	Marshall Johnston	5 ft 11 in (180 cm)	181 lb (82 kg)	June 6, 1941 (aged 22)	N/A
11	F	Paul Conlin	5 ft 10 in (178 cm)	185 lb (84 kg)	January 26, 1943 (aged 21)	N/A
12	F	George Swarbrick	5 ft 10 in (178 cm)	172 lb (78 kg)	February 16, 1942 (aged 21)	(Canada) Moose Jaw Pla-Mors
14	F	Robert Forhan	-	-	March 27, 1936 (aged 27)	N/A
15	F	Gary Begg	6 ft 1 in (185 cm)	185 lb (84 kg)	December 29, 1940 (aged 23)	N/A
16	F	Terry Clancy	5 ft 11 in (180 cm)	185 lb (84 kg)	April 2, 1943 (aged 20)	(United States) Rochester Americans
18	F	Ray Cadieux	5 ft 10 in (178 cm)	170 lb (77 kg)	December 27, 1941 (aged 22)	N/A
24	F	Brian Conacher	6 ft 3 in (191 cm)	196 lb (89 kg)	August 31, 1941 (aged 22)	N/A

== Czechoslovakia ==
Head coach: Jiří Anton

No.	Pos.	Name	Height	Weight	Birthdate	Team
1	G	Vladimír Dzurilla	5 ft 10 in (178 cm)	205 lb (93 kg)	August 2, 1942 (aged 21)	(Czechoslovakia) HC Slovan Bratislava
2	D	František Gregor	5 ft 11 in (180 cm)	176 lb (80 kg)	December 8, 1938 (aged 25)	(Czechoslovakia) HC Slovan Bratislava
3	D	František Tikal	5 ft 11 in (180 cm)	181 lb (82 kg)	July 18, 1933 (aged 30)	(Czechoslovakia) TJ Spartak Praha Sokolovo
4	D	Stanislav Sventek	6 ft 2 in (188 cm)	201 lb (91 kg)	November 9, 1930 (aged 33)	(Czechoslovakia) Spartak Plzeň
5	D	Rudolf Potsch	6 ft 2 in (188 cm)	209 lb (95 kg)	June 15, 1937 (aged 26)	(Czechoslovakia) TJ Brno
6	D	Ladislav Šmíd	5 ft 7 in (170 cm)	165 lb (75 kg)	May 24, 1938 (aged 25)	(Czechoslovakia) ASD Dukla Jihlava
7	F	Miroslav Vlach	5 ft 7 in (170 cm)	163 lb (74 kg)	October 19, 1935 (aged 28)	(Czechoslovakia) TJ VŽKG Ostrava
8	F	Stanislav Prýl	5 ft 9 in (175 cm)	176 lb (80 kg)	November 23, 1942 (aged 21)	(Czechoslovakia) TJ Pardubice
9	F/D	Jozef Golonka	5 ft 9 in (175 cm)	165 lb (75 kg)	January 6, 1938 (aged 26)	(Czechoslovakia) HC Slovan Bratislava
10	F	Jaroslav Walter	5 ft 11 in (180 cm)	174 lb (79 kg)	January 5, 1939 (aged 25)	(Czechoslovakia) TJ Litvínov
11	F	Jan Klapáč	5 ft 9 in (175 cm)	168 lb (76 kg)	February 27, 1941 (aged 22)	(Czechoslovakia) ASD Dukla Jihlava
12	F	Vlastimil Bubník (C)	5 ft 9 in (175 cm)	154 lb (70 kg)	March 18, 1931 (aged 32)	(Czechoslovakia) TJ Brno
13	F	Jiří Holík	5 ft 11 in (180 cm)	176 lb (80 kg)	July 9, 1944 (aged 19)	(Czechoslovakia) Jiskra Havlíčkův Brod
14	F	Jiří Dolana	5 ft 7 in (170 cm)	176 lb (80 kg)	March 16, 1937 (aged 26)	(Czechoslovakia) TJ Pardubice
15	F	Josef Černý	5 ft 8 in (173 cm)	165 lb (75 kg)	October 18, 1939 (aged 24)	(Czechoslovakia) TJ Brno
16	F	Jaroslav Jiřík	5 ft 7 in (170 cm)	176 lb (80 kg)	December 10, 1939 (aged 24)	(Czechoslovakia) TJ Brno
17	G	Vladimír Nadrchal	5 ft 8 in (173 cm)	159 lb (72 kg)	March 4, 1938 (aged 25)	(Czechoslovakia) TJ Brno

== Finland ==
Head coach: (Canada) Joe Wirkkunen

Assistant coach: Risto Lindroos

No.	Pos.	Name	Height	Weight	Birthdate	Team
1	G	Juhani Lahtinen	5 ft 8 in (173 cm)	185 lb (84 kg)	September 28, 1938 (aged 25)	(Finland) Ilves
2	D	Jorma Suokko	-	-	May 27, 1940 (aged 23)	(Finland) TKV
3	D	Kalevi Numminen	-	-	January 31, 1940 (aged 24)	(Finland) Tappara
4	D	Ikka Mesikämmen	-	-	March 15, 1943 (aged 20)	(Finland) TPS
5	D	Jarmo Wasama	-	-	December 2, 1943 (aged 20)	(Finland) Ilves
6	F	Esko Luostarinen	-	-	May 8, 1935 (aged 28)	(Finland) Tappara
7	F	Raimo Kilpiö (C)	5 ft 9 in (175 cm)	163 lb (74 kg)	February 2, 1936 (aged 28)	(Finland) RU-38
8	F	Lasse Oksanen	6 ft 0 in (183 cm)	181 lb (82 kg)	December 7, 1942 (aged 21)	(Finland) Ilves
9	F	Jorma Peltonen	5 ft 10 in (178 cm)	176 lb (80 kg)	January 11, 1944 (aged 20)	(Finland) Ilves
10	F	Heino Pulli	-	-	February 22, 1938 (aged 25)	(Finland) TKV
11	F	Seppo Nikkilä	-	-	December 23, 1936 (aged 27)	(Finland) TKV
12	F	Matti Reunamäki	-	-	July 25, 1940 (aged 23)	(Finland) TKV
13	D	Rauno Lethiö	6 ft 1 in (185 cm)	203 lb (92 kg)	March 3, 1942 (aged 21)	(Finland) TKV
14	F	Juhani Wahlsten	5 ft 9 in (175 cm)	181 lb (82 kg)	January 13, 1938 (aged 26)	(Finland) TPS
15	F	Esko Kaonpää	5 ft 10 in (178 cm)	181 lb (82 kg)	July 4, 1942 (aged 21)	(Finland) HIFK
16	F	Jouni Seistamo	5 ft 7 in (170 cm)	152 lb (69 kg)	January 9, 1939 (aged 25)	(Finland) Tappara
17	F	Urpo Ylönen	5 ft 8 in (173 cm)	165 lb (75 kg)	May 25, 1943 (aged 20)	(Finland) TuTo

== Germany ==
Head coach: Markus Egen

Assistant coach: Engelbert Holderied

No.	Pos.	Name	Height	Weight	Birthdate	Team
1	G	Michael Hobelsberger	5 ft 8 in (173 cm)	179 lb (81 kg)	September 25, 1935 (aged 28)	(Germany) SC Riessersee
1	G	Ulli Jansen	5 ft 7 in (170 cm)	168 lb (76 kg)	June 5, 1931 (aged 32)	(Germany) Krefelder EV 1936
4	D	Otto Schneitberger	5 ft 7 in (170 cm)	161 lb (73 kg)	September 29, 1939 (aged 24)	(Germany) EC Bad Tölz
5	D	Paul Ambros	5 ft 9 in (175 cm)	168 lb (76 kg)	June 22, 1933 (aged 30)	(Germany) EV Füssen
6	F	Sylvester Wackerle	-	-	April 26, 1937 (aged 26)	(Germany) SC Riessersee
7	F	Sepp Reif	5 ft 11 in (180 cm)	187 lb (85 kg)	September 5, 1937 (aged 26)	(Germany) EC Bad Tölz
8	F	Siegfried Schubert	5 ft 8 in (173 cm)	163 lb (74 kg)	October 4, 1939 (aged 24)	(Germany) EV Füssen
9	F	Ernst Köpf	5 ft 10 in (178 cm)	179 lb (81 kg)	February 10, 1940 (aged 23)	(Germany) EV Füssen
10	F	Horst Schuldes	5 ft 9 in (175 cm)	168 lb (76 kg)	March 18, 1939 (aged 24)	(Germany) SC Riessersee
11	F	Helmut Zanghellini	5 ft 10 in (178 cm)	150 lb (68 kg)	December 16, 1939 (aged 24)	(Germany) EV Füssen
12	F	Albert Loibl	5 ft 7 in (170 cm)	163 lb (74 kg)	November 20, 1937 (aged 26)	(Germany) EC Bad Tölz
14	F	Ernst Trautwein (C)	-	-	April 8, 1936 (aged 27)	(Germany) EV Füssen
15	F	Kurt Sepp	-	-	September 14, 1935 (aged 28)	(Germany) Mannheimer ERC
16	F	Georg Scholz	5 ft 9 in (175 cm)	150 lb (68 kg)	June 24, 1937 (aged 26)	(Germany) EV Füssen
17	F	Bernd Herzig	5 ft 11 in (180 cm)	176 lb (80 kg)	May 21, 1941 (aged 22)	(Germany) SG Nürnberg
18	D	Leonhard Waitl	5 ft 10 in (178 cm)	174 lb (79 kg)	April 5, 1939 (aged 24)	(Germany) EV Füssen
19	F/D	Peter Schwimmbeck	5 ft 7 in (170 cm)	154 lb (70 kg)	September 14, 1941 (aged 22)	(Germany) EV Füssen

== Hungary ==
Head coach: (Czechoslovakia) Vladimir Kominek

No.	Pos.	Name	Height	Weight	Birthdate	Team
1	G	Mátyás Vedres	-	-	April 18, 1943 (aged 20)	(Hungary) Újpesti Dózsa SC
2	D	János Ziegler	5 ft 9 in (175 cm)	154 lb (70 kg)	April 6, 1941 (aged 22)	(Hungary) Vörös Meteor Budapest
3	F/D	György Raffa	5 ft 11 in (180 cm)	176 lb (80 kg)	May 16, 1938 (aged 25)	(Hungary) Ferencvárosi TC
4	D	Lájos Koutny	6 ft 2 in (188 cm)	187 lb (85 kg)	October 17, 1939 (aged 24)	(Hungary) Budapesti Vaustas SC
5	D	József Babán (C)	5 ft 7 in (170 cm)	168 lb (76 kg)	May 25, 1935 (aged 28)	(Hungary) Budapesti Vaustas SC
6	D/F	József Kertész	-	-	January 28, 1940 (aged 24)	(Hungary) Budapesti Vaustas SC
7	F	János Beszteri	5 ft 9 in (175 cm)	148 lb (67 kg)	August 9, 1938 (aged 25)	(Hungary) Ferencvárosi TC
8	F	László Jakabházy	-	-	November 14, 1938 (aged 25)	(Hungary) Ferencvárosi TC
9	F	Péter Bikár	6 ft 0 in (183 cm)	159 lb (72 kg)	November 5, 1945 (aged 18)	(Hungary) Budapesti Vaustas SC
10	F	Gábor Boróczi	5 ft 9 in (175 cm)	168 lb (76 kg)	April 2, 1939 (aged 24)	(Hungary) Újpesti Dózsa SC
11	F/D	Károly Orosz	5 ft 9 in (175 cm)	148 lb (67 kg)	January 28, 1945 (aged 19)	(Hungary) Postás Budapest
12	F	Viktor Zsitva	5 ft 9 in (175 cm)	159 lb (72 kg)	July 14, 1939 (aged 20)	(Hungary) Újpesti Dózsa SC
13	F	Béla Schwalm	6 ft 0 in (183 cm)	183 lb (83 kg)	October 25, 1941 (aged 22)	(Hungary) Ferencvárosi TC
14	F	Árpad Bánkuti	5 ft 9 in (175 cm)	170 lb (77 kg)	May 13, 1941 (aged 22)	(Hungary) Újpesti Dózsa SC
15	F	György Rozgonyi	5 ft 9 in (175 cm)	148 lb (67 kg)	May 31, 1943 (aged 20)	(Hungary) Vörös Meteor Budapest
16	F	Ferenc Lőrincz	5 ft 9 in (175 cm)	165 lb (75 kg)	January 23, 1933 (aged 31)	(Hungary) Újpesti Dózsa SC
17	G	György Losnoczi	5 ft 9 in (175 cm)	159 lb (72 kg)	September 9, 1940 (aged 23)	(Hungary) Vörös Meteor Budapest

== Italy ==
Head coach: (Czechoslovakia) Slavomír Bartoň

No.	Pos.	Name	Height	Weight	Birthdate	Team
-	G	Roberto Gamper	6 ft 3 in (191 cm)	176 lb (80 kg)	August 31, 1943 (aged 20)	(Italy) HC Bolzano
1	G	Vittorio Bolla	-	-	January 12, 1931 (aged 33)	(Italy) Diavoli Milano
2	D	Enrico Bacher	6 ft 5 in (196 cm)	220 lb (100 kg)	December 27, 1940 (aged 23)	(Italy) HC Bolzano
3	D	Giulio Verocai	5 ft 9 in (175 cm)	163 lb (74 kg)	March 31, 1942 (aged 21)	(Italy) Cortina
4	D	Gianfranco Da Rin (C)	-	-	June 15, 1935 (aged 28)	(Italy) Cortina
5	D	Isidoro Alverà	-	-	March 3, 1945 (aged 18)	(Italy) Cortina
6	F	Giulio Oberhammer	-	-	December 14, 1935 (aged 28)	(Italy) Cortina
7	F	Bruno Frison	-	-	May 14, 1936 (aged 27)	(Italy) Cortina
8	F	Ivo Ghezze	-	-	March 3, 1941 (aged 22)	(Italy) Cortina
9	F	Giampiero Branduardi	-	-	August 28, 1936 (aged 27)	(Italy) Diavoli Milano
10	F	Giancarlo Agazzi	5 ft 10 in (178 cm)	161 lb (73 kg)	August 22, 1932 (aged 31)	(Italy) Diavoli Milano
11	F	Alberto Da Rin	5 ft 5 in (165 cm)	154 lb (70 kg)	December 11, 1939 (aged 24)	(Italy) Cortina
12	F	Bruno Ghedina	-	-	February 21, 1943 (aged 17)	(Italy) Cortina
13	F	Giovanni Mastel	5 ft 5 in (165 cm)	150 lb (68 kg)	May 6, 1943 (aged 20)	(Italy) Cortina
14	F	Enrico Benedetti	-	-	August 16, 1940 (aged 23)	N/A
15	F	Francesco Macchietto	-	-	July 31, 1932 (aged 31)	(Italy) Cortina
17	F	Edmondo Rabanser	-	-	November 3, 1936 (aged 27)	N/A

== Japan ==
Head coach: Niuro Hoshino

No.	Pos.	Name	Height	Weight	Birthdate	Team
1	F	Isao Ono	5 ft 11 in (180 cm)	163 lb (74 kg)	August 5, 1933 (aged 30)	(Japan) Iwakura Tomakomai
2	F	Masahiro Sato	-	-	October 27, 1936 (aged 27)	(Japan) Iwakura Tomakomai
3	F	Isao Kawabuchi	-	-	December 13, 1936 (aged 27)	(Japan) Iwakura Tomakomai
4	F	Kimio Kazahari	-	-	February 18, 1936 (aged 27)	(Japan) Iwakura Tomakomai
5	F	Koji Iwamoto	5 ft 8 in (173 cm)	148 lb (67 kg)	January 22, 1942 (aged 22)	(Japan) Iwakura Tomakomai
6	F	Atsuo Irie	5 ft 5 in (165 cm)	134 lb (61 kg)	October 31, 1937 (aged 26)	(Japan) Furukawa
7	F	Hidenori Inatsu	5 ft 9 in (175 cm)	163 lb (74 kg)	June 5, 1938 (aged 25)	(Japan) Furukawa
8	F	Mamoru Takashima	5 ft 5 in (165 cm)	137 lb (62 kg)	March 3, 1938 (aged 25)	(Japan) Oji Seishi
9	F	Shinichi Honma	5 ft 7 in (170 cm)	163 lb (74 kg)	November 3, 1934 (aged 29)	(Japan) Oji Seishi
10	F	Kimihisa Kudo	5 ft 5 in (165 cm)	157 lb (71 kg)	September 6, 1939 (aged 24)	(Japan) Oji Seishi
11	D	Masami Tanabu	5 ft 9 in (175 cm)	163 lb (74 kg)	December 7, 1934 (aged 29)	(Japan) Iwakura Tomakomai
12	D	Shigeru Shimada	5 ft 7 in (170 cm)	154 lb (70 kg)	October 16, 1935 (aged 28)	(Japan) Furukawa
13	F	Minoru Nakano	-	-	October 18, 1936 (aged 27)	(Japan) Iwakura Tomakomai
14	D	Hiroyuki Matsuura	-	-	August 18, 1937 (aged 26)	(Japan) Iwakura Tomakomai
15	D	Jiro Ogawa	-	-	January 20, 1939 (aged 25)	(Japan) Iwakura Tomakomai
16	G	Toshiei Honma	6 ft 0 in (183 cm)	179 lb (81 kg)	December 12, 1935 (aged 28)	(Japan) Furukawa
17	G	Katsuji Morishima	5 ft 9 in (175 cm)	146 lb (66 kg)	October 22, 1942 (aged 21)	(Japan) Iwakura Tomakomai

== Norway ==
Head coach: Rolf Kirkvaag

No.	Pos.	Name	Height	Weight	Birthdate	Team
1	G	Kåre Østensen	6 ft 0 in (183 cm)	181 lb (82 kg)	December 5, 1943 (aged 20)	(Norway) Tigrene
2	D	Tor Gundersen	-	-	September 15, 1935 (aged 28)	(Norway) Vålerenge
3	D	Svein Norman Hasen	5 ft 7 in (170 cm)	187 lb (85 kg)	April 18, 1943 (aged 20)	(Norway) Vålerenge
4	D	Thor Martinsen	5 ft 7 in (170 cm)	176 lb (80 kg)	July 12, 1945 (aged 18)	(Norway) Skeid
5	D	Jan Roar Thoresen	-	-	March 24, 1940 (aged 23)	(Norway) Vålerenge
6	F	Christian Petersen	5 ft 6 in (168 cm)	143 lb (65 kg)	December 21, 1937 (aged 26)	(Norway) Gamlebyen
7	F	Per Skjerven Olsen	5 ft 9 in (175 cm)	163 lb (74 kg)	September 26, 1939 (aged 24)	(Norway) Skeid
8	F	Georg Smefjell	5 ft 10 in (178 cm)	154 lb (70 kg)	June 9, 1937 (aged 26)	(Norway) Tigrene
9	F	Bjørn Elvenes	-	-	June 12, 1944 (aged 19)	(Norway) Rosenhoff IL
10	F	Olav Dalsøren (C)	5 ft 11 in (180 cm)	183 lb (83 kg)	September 8, 1938 (aged 25)	(Norway) Tigrene
11	F	Einar Bruno Larsen	-	-	November 17, 1939 (aged 24)	(Norway) Vålerenge
12	F	Frank Olafsen	-	-	April 20, 1944 (aged 19)	(Norway) Skeid
13	F	Thor-Erik Lundby	-	-	March 5, 1937 (aged 26)	(Norway) Rosenhoff IL
14	F	Erik Fjeldstad	-	-	February 20, 1944 (aged 19)	(Norway) Rosenhoff IL
15	G	Øystein Mellerud	5 ft 10 in (178 cm)	163 lb (74 kg)	July 6, 1938 (aged 25)	(Norway) Gamlebyen
16	F/D	Egil Bjerklund	-	-	September 5, 1933 (aged 30)	(Norway) Hasle-Løren
17	F	Jan Erik Hansen	-	-	September 24, 1940 (aged 23)	(Norway) Gamlebyen

== Poland ==
Head coach: (Canada) Gary Hughes

No.	Pos.	Name	Height	Weight	Birthdate	Team
1	G	Józef Wiśniewski	5 ft 6 in (168 cm)	170 lb (77 kg)	November 1, 1940 (aged 23)	(Poland) Pomorzanin Torun
2	D	Stanisław Olczyk	5 ft 7 in (170 cm)	152 lb (69 kg)	October 15, 1932 (aged 31)	(Poland) Wlokniarz Zgirez
3	D	Henryk Handy	5 ft 5 in (165 cm)	137 lb (62 kg)	July 9, 1940 (aged 23)	(Poland) Legia Warszawa
4	D	Hubert Sitko	5 ft 7 in (170 cm)	154 lb (70 kg)	December 26, 1939 (aged 24)	(Poland) Gornik 1920 Katowice
5	D/F	Augustyn Skórski	5 ft 9 in (175 cm)	165 lb (75 kg)	November 6, 1936 (aged 27)	(Poland) Baildon Katowice
6	D	Gerard Langner	5 ft 11 in (180 cm)	187 lb (85 kg)	February 15, 1943 (aged 20)	(Poland) Legia Warszawa
7	F	Bronisław Gosztyła	5 ft 5 in (165 cm)	154 lb (70 kg)	October 11, 1935 (aged 28)	(Poland) Legia Warszawa
8	F	Andrzej Fonfara	5 ft 7 in (170 cm)	161 lb (73 kg)	September 21, 1939 (aged 24)	(Poland) Gornik 1920 Katowice
9	F	Józef Manowski	5 ft 7 in (170 cm)	172 lb (78 kg)	January 7, 1935 (aged 29)	(Poland) Legia Warszawa
10	F	Jerzy Ogórczyk	5 ft 7 in (170 cm)	134 lb (61 kg)	February 8, 1938 (aged 26)	(Poland) Baildon Katowice
11	F	Sylwester Wilczek	5 ft 8 in (173 cm)	165 lb (75 kg)	December 10, 1936 (aged 27)	(Poland) Gornik 1920 Katowice
12	F	Józef Kurek (C)	6 ft 0 in (183 cm)	163 lb (74 kg)	January 2, 1933 (aged 31)	(Poland) Legia Warszawa
13	F	Tadeusz Kilanowicz	5 ft 8 in (173 cm)	159 lb (72 kg)	June 8, 1940 (aged 23)	(Poland) Podhale Nowy Targ
14	F	Andrzej Żurawski	5 ft 9 in (175 cm)	165 lb (75 kg)	September 6, 1940 (aged 23)	(Poland) Pomorzanin Torun
15	F	Andrzej Szal	5 ft 8 in (173 cm)	161 lb (73 kg)	January 10, 1942 (aged 22)	(Poland) Legia Warszawa
16	F	Józef Stefaniak	5 ft 6 in (168 cm)	165 lb (75 kg)	March 14, 1941 (aged 22)	(Poland) Pomorzanin Torun
17	G	Władysław Pabisz	5 ft 7 in (170 cm)	148 lb (67 kg)	January 5, 1931 (aged 33)	(Poland) Podhale Nowy Targ

== Romania ==
Head coaches: Mihai Flamaropol, (Czechoslovakia) Ladislav Horský

No.	Pos.	Name	Height	Weight	Birthdate	Team
1	G	Iosef Sofian	-	-	1939 (aged 24/25)	(Romania) Voința Miercurea Ciuc
2	D	Ştefan Ionescu	5 ft 6 in (168 cm)	168 lb (76 kg)	February 17, 1935 (aged 28)	(Romania) Steaua București
3	D	Zoltán Czáka (C)	5 ft 10 in (178 cm)	176 lb (80 kg)	December 2, 1932 (aged 31)	(Romania) Steaua București
4	D	Dezső Varga	5 ft 10 in (178 cm)	176 lb (80 kg)	May 14, 1939 (aged 24)	(Romania) Voința Miercurea Ciuc
6	F	Iuliu Szabo	5 ft 6 in (168 cm)	152 lb (69 kg)	December 1, 1940 (aged 23)	(Romania) Voința Miercurea Ciuc
7	F	Ion Ferenz	5 ft 5 in (165 cm)	146 lb (66 kg)	June 10, 1932 (aged 31)	(Romania) Voința Miercurea Ciuc
8	F	Geza Szabo	5 ft 5 in (165 cm)	146 lb (66 kg)	December 1, 1940 (aged 23)	(Romania) Voința Miercurea Ciuc
10	F	Anton Biró	6 ft 0 in (183 cm)	172 lb (78 kg)	September 30, 1939 (aged 24)	(Romania) Steaua București
11	F	Alexandru Calamar	5 ft 9 in (175 cm)	154 lb (70 kg)	June 20, 1941 (aged 22)	(Romania) Steaua București
12	F	Andrei Ioanovici	5 ft 10 in (178 cm)	143 lb (65 kg)	July 8, 1942 (aged 21)	(Romania) Voința Miercurea Ciuc
13	F	Dan Mihăilescu	5 ft 11 in (180 cm)	159 lb (72 kg)	July 2, 1945 (aged 18)	(Romania) Constructorul Bucharest
14	F	Nicolae Andrei	5 ft 7 in (170 cm)	150 lb (68 kg)	December 8, 1939 (aged 24)	(Romania) Voința Miercurea Ciuc
15	F	Eduard Pană	5 ft 8 in (173 cm)	163 lb (74 kg)	May 28, 1944 (aged 19)	(Romania) Dinamo București
16	D	Ion Țiriac	6 ft 0 in (183 cm)	185 lb (84 kg)	May 9, 1939 (aged 24)	(Romania) Știința Bucharest
17	F	Iulian Florescu	5 ft 10 in (178 cm)	154 lb (70 kg)	October 23, 1943 (aged 20)	(Romania) Dinamo București
19	F	Adalbert Naghi	5 ft 10 in (178 cm)	163 lb (74 kg)	February 3, 1933 (aged 31)	(Romania) Știința Cluj
20	G	Anton Crișan	5 ft 9 in (175 cm)	159 lb (72 kg)	January 17, 1942 (aged 22)	(Romania) Steaua București

== Soviet Union ==
Head coach: Arkadi Chernyshyev

Assistant coach: Anatoly Tarasov

No.	Pos.	Name	Height	Weight	Birthdate	Team
1	G	Viktor Konovalenko	5 ft 8 in (173 cm)	168 lb (76 kg)	November 3, 1938 (aged 25)	(Soviet Union) Torpedo Gorky
2	D	Vitali Davydov	5 ft 8 in (173 cm)	161 lb (73 kg)	April 1, 1939 (aged 24)	(Soviet Union) Dynamo Moskva
3	D	Eduard Ivanov	5 ft 9 in (175 cm)	183 lb (83 kg)	April 25, 1938 (aged 25)	(Soviet Union) CSKA Moskva
4	D	Alexander Ragulin	6 ft 1 in (185 cm)	220 lb (100 kg)	May 5, 1941 (aged 22)	(Soviet Union) CSKA Moskva
5	D	Viktor Kuzkin	5 ft 11 in (180 cm)	194 lb (88 kg)	July 6, 1940 (aged 23)	(Soviet Union) CSKA Moskva
6	D	Oleg Zaytsev	5 ft 10 in (178 cm)	187 lb (85 kg)	August 4, 1939 (aged 24)	(Soviet Union) CSKA Moskva
7	F	Konstantin Loktev	5 ft 7 in (170 cm)	165 lb (75 kg)	April 16, 1933 (aged 30)	(Soviet Union) CSKA Moskva
8	F	Veniamin Alexandrov	5 ft 11 in (180 cm)	174 lb (79 kg)	April 18, 1937 (aged 26)	(Soviet Union) CSKA Moskva
9	F	Alexander Almetov	5 ft 10 in (178 cm)	183 lb (83 kg)	January 18, 1940 (aged 24)	(Soviet Union) CSKA Moskva
10	F	Viktor Yakushev	5 ft 7 in (170 cm)	179 lb (81 kg)	November 16, 1937 (aged 26)	(Soviet Union) Lokomotiv Moscow
11	F	Vyacheslav Starshinov	5 ft 8 in (173 cm)	181 lb (82 kg)	May 6, 1940 (aged 23)	(Soviet Union) Spartak Moskva
12	F	Boris Mayorov (C)	5 ft 9 in (175 cm)	152 lb (69 kg)	February 11, 1938 (aged 25)	(Soviet Union) Spartak Moskva
13	F	Anatoli Firsov	5 ft 9 in (175 cm)	154 lb (70 kg)	February 1, 1941 (aged 23)	(Soviet Union) CSKA Moskva
14	F	Yevgeni Mayorov	5 ft 8 in (173 cm)	159 lb (72 kg)	February 11, 1938 (aged 25)	(Soviet Union) Spartak Moskva
15	F	Leonid Volkov	5 ft 5 in (165 cm)	152 lb (69 kg)	December 9, 1934 (aged 29)	(Soviet Union) CSKA Moskva
16	F	Stanislav Petukhov	6 ft 1 in (185 cm)	201 lb (91 kg)	August 19, 1937 (aged 26)	(Soviet Union) Dynamo Moskva
17	G	Boris Zaytsev	5 ft 10 in (178 cm)	168 lb (76 kg)	March 23, 1937 (aged 26)	(Soviet Union) Dynamo Moskva

== Sweden ==
No.	Pos.	Name	Height	Weight	Birthdate	Team
1	G	Kjell Svensson	-	-	September 10, 1938 (aged 25)	(Sweden) Södertälje SK
2	D	Gert Blomé	-	-	August 28, 1934 (aged 29)	(Sweden) Västra Frölunda IF
3	D	Nils Johansson	5 ft 11 in (180 cm)	157 lb (71 kg)	July 24, 1938 (aged 25)	(Sweden) Modo AIK
4	D	Roland Stoltz	6 ft 2 in (188 cm)	187 lb (85 kg)	August 1, 1931 (aged 32)	(Sweden) Djurgårdens IF
5	D	Bert-Ola Nordlander	5 ft 11 in (180 cm)	187 lb (85 kg)	August 12, 1938 (aged 25)	(Sweden) AIK
6	F/D	Ronald Pettersson	6 ft 0 in (183 cm)	181 lb (82 kg)	April 16, 1935 (aged 28)	(Sweden) Västra Frölunda IF
7	F	Nils Nilsson	-	-	March 8, 1936 (aged 27)	(Sweden) Leksands IF
8	F	Lars-Eric Lundvall	5 ft 11 in (180 cm)	172 lb (78 kg)	April 3, 1934 (aged 29)	(Sweden) Västra Frölunda IF
9	F	Hans Mild	-	-	July 31, 1934 (aged 29)	(Sweden) Djurgårdens IF
10	F	Ulf Sterner	6 ft 2 in (188 cm)	185 lb (84 kg)	February 11, 1941 (aged 22)	(Sweden) Västra Frölunda IF
11	F	Carl-Göran Öberg	6 ft 0 in (183 cm)	176 lb (80 kg)	December 24, 1938 (aged 25)	(Sweden) Djurgårdens IF
12	D/F	Eilert Määttä	-	-	September 22, 1935 (aged 28)	(Sweden) Södertälje SK
13	F	Sven Tumba	6 ft 2 in (188 cm)	190 lb (86 kg)	August 27, 1931 (aged 32)	(Sweden) Djurgårdens IF
14	F	Uno Öhrlund	-	-	May 22, 1937 (aged 26)	(Sweden) Västerås IK
15	G	Lennart Häggroth	-	-	March 2, 1940 (aged 23)	(Sweden) Skellefteå AIK
16	F	Anders Andersson	5 ft 10 in (178 cm)	159 lb (72 kg)	February 1, 1937 (aged 27)	(Sweden) Skellefteå AIK
17	F	Lennart Johansson	6 ft 2 in (188 cm)	198 lb (90 kg)	June 7, 1941 (aged 22)	(Sweden) Brynäs IF

== Switzerland ==
Head coach: (Canada) Hervé Lalonde

No.	Pos.	Name	Height	Weight	Birthdate	Team
1	G	Gérald Rigolet	5 ft 8 in (173 cm)	157 lb (71 kg)	March 26, 1941 (aged 22)	(Switzerland) Villars HC
2	F/D	Elvin Friedrich (C)	5 ft 9 in (175 cm)	141 lb (64 kg)	July 25, 1933 (aged 30)	(Switzerland) Lugano
3	D	Max Rüegg	6 ft 0 in (183 cm)	172 lb (78 kg)	March 12, 1942 (aged 21)	(Switzerland) SC Bern
4	F/D	Peter Wespi	5 ft 8 in (173 cm)	141 lb (64 kg)	March 22, 1943 (aged 20)	(Switzerland) Zürcher SC
5	D	Otto Wittwer	5 ft 5 in (165 cm)	181 lb (82 kg)	December 24, 1937 (aged 26)	(Switzerland) SC Langnau
6	D	Gaston Furrer	5 ft 10 in (178 cm)	168 lb (76 kg)	May 10, 1945 (aged 18)	(Switzerland) EHC Visp
7	F	Walter Salzmann	6 ft 1 in (185 cm)	198 lb (90 kg)	May 13, 1936 (aged 27)	(Switzerland) EHC Visp
8	F	Kurt Pfammatter	5 ft 10 in (178 cm)	159 lb (72 kg)	March 30, 1941 (aged 22)	(Switzerland) EHC Visp
9	F	Herold Truffer	5 ft 9 in (175 cm)	163 lb (74 kg)	July 14, 1936 (aged 27)	(Switzerland) EHC Visp
10	F	Pio Parolini	5 ft 7 in (170 cm)	163 lb (74 kg)	February 19, 1940 (aged 23)	(Switzerland) Zürcher SC
11	F	Peter Stammbach	5 ft 10 in (178 cm)	176 lb (80 kg)	November 27, 1937 (aged 26)	(Switzerland) SC Bern
12	F	Rolf Diethelm	5 ft 9 in (175 cm)	181 lb (82 kg)	October 2, 1939 (aged 24)	(Switzerland) SC Bern
14	F	Oskar Jenni	5 ft 10 in (178 cm)	163 lb (74 kg)	July 17, 1939 (aged 24)	(Switzerland) HC Davos
15	F	Roger Chappot	5 ft 9 in (175 cm)	165 lb (75 kg)	October 17, 1940 (aged 23)	(Switzerland) Villars HC
16	F	Franz Berry	5 ft 11 in (180 cm)	172 lb (78 kg)	November 21, 1938 (aged 25)	(Switzerland) Lausanne HC
17	F	Jürg Zimmermann	5 ft 11 in (180 cm)	165 lb (75 kg)	January 1, 1943 (aged 21)	(Switzerland) EHC Biel-Bienne
18	G	René Kiener	5 ft 9 in (175 cm)	163 lb (74 kg)	May 21, 1938 (aged 25)	(Switzerland) SC Bern

== United States ==
Head coach: Walter Bush

No.	Pos.	Name	Height	Weight	Birthdate	Team
1	G	Pat Rupp	5 ft 9 in (175 cm)	179 lb (81 kg)	August 12, 1942 (aged 21)	(United States) Philadelphia Ramblers
1	G	Tom Yurkovich	5 ft 11 in (180 cm)	181 lb (82 kg)	September 29, 1935 (aged 28)	(United States) Rochester Mustangs
2	D	Tom "Red" Martin	6 ft 0 in (183 cm)	190 lb (86 kg)	July 5, 1938 (aged 25)	N/A
3	D	Jim McCoy	5 ft 10 in (178 cm)	170 lb (77 kg)	January 2, 1942 (aged 22)	N/A
4	D	Wayne Meredith	5 ft 9 in (175 cm)	179 lb (81 kg)	October 4, 1939 (aged 24)	N/A
5	F	Bill Christian	5 ft 9 in (175 cm)	176 lb (80 kg)	January 29, 1938 (aged 26)	(United States) Warroad Lakers
6	F	Dave Brooks	5 ft 8 in (173 cm)	146 lb (66 kg)	December 27, 1939 (aged 24)	(United States) Rochester Mustangs
7	F	Bill Reichart	5 ft 7 in (170 cm)	157 lb (71 kg)	July 3, 1935 (aged 28)	(United States) Rochester Mustangs
8	F	Gary Schmalzbauer	5 ft 9 in (175 cm)	170 lb (77 kg)	January 27, 1940 (aged 24)	(United States) Rochester Mustangs
9	D/F	Herb Brooks	5 ft 10 in (178 cm)	165 lb (75 kg)	August 5, 1937 (aged 26)	N/A
10	F	Dan Dilworth	5 ft 8 in (173 cm)	170 lb (77 kg)	February 23, 1942 (aged 21)	N/A
11	F	Roger Christian	5 ft 9 in (175 cm)	150 lb (68 kg)	December 1, 1935 (aged 28)	N/A
12	F	Paul Johnson	5 ft 11 in (180 cm)	181 lb (82 kg)	May 18, 1937 (aged 26)	(United States) Waterloo Black Hawks
14	F	Dates Fryberger	5 ft 10 in (178 cm)	161 lb (73 kg)	May 5, 1940 (aged 23)	N/A
16	F	Paul Coppo	5 ft 11 in (180 cm)	176 lb (80 kg)	November 2, 1938 (aged 25)	(United States) Green Bay Bobcats
18	D	Jim Westby	6 ft 0 in (183 cm)	174 lb (79 kg)	March 5, 1937 (aged 26)	N/A
20	D/F	Don Ross	5 ft 11 in (180 cm)	183 lb (83 kg)	October 11, 1942 (aged 21)	N/A

== Yugoslavia ==
Head coach: (Czechoslovakia) Vaclav Bubník

No.	Pos.	Name	Height	Weight	Birthdate	Team
-	F	Alex Anđelić	-	-	October 16, 1940 (aged 23)	(Socialist Federal Republic of Yugoslavia) HK Partizan Beograd
-	F	Miroljub Ðorđević	-	-	November 27, 1938 (aged 25)	N/A
-	F	Albin Felc	5 ft 9 in (175 cm)	150 lb (68 kg)	May 17, 1941 (aged 22)	N/A
-	G	Anton Jože Gale	5 ft 10 in (178 cm)	181 lb (82 kg)	March 26, 1944 (aged 19)	(Socialist Federal Republic of Yugoslavia) Olimpija Ljubljana
-	F	Mirko Holbus	-	-	January 26, 1940 (aged 24)	N/A
-	F/D	Bogo Jan	5 ft 7 in (170 cm)	161 lb (73 kg)	February 20, 1944 (aged 19)	N/A
-	D	Ivo Jan	5 ft 7 in (170 cm)	159 lb (72 kg)	April 10, 1942 (aged 21)	N/A
-	D	Marjan Kristan	-	-	July 16, 1937 (aged 26)	N/A
-	D	Miran Krmelj	-	-	February 23, 1941 (aged 22)	(Socialist Federal Republic of Yugoslavia) Medveščak Zagreb
-	D	Igor Radin	6 ft 1 in (185 cm)	185 lb (84 kg)	May 1, 1938 (aged 25)	(Socialist Federal Republic of Yugoslavia) Olimpija Ljubljana
-	D	Ivo Ratej	5 ft 7 in (170 cm)	163 lb (74 kg)	September 11, 1941 (aged 22)	(Socialist Federal Republic of Yugoslavia) Medveščak Zagreb
-	D	Viktor Ravnik	5 ft 11 in (180 cm)	205 lb (93 kg)	October 19, 1941 (aged 22)	N/A
-	F	Boris Renaud	5 ft 9 in (175 cm)	168 lb (76 kg)	January 2, 1946 (aged 18)	(Socialist Federal Republic of Yugoslavia) Medveščak Zagreb
-	G	Rašid Šemšedinović	-	-	January 11, 1941 (aged 23)	(Socialist Federal Republic of Yugoslavia) HK Partizan Beograd
-	F	Franc Smolej	5 ft 10 in (178 cm)	168 lb (76 kg)	July 18, 1940 (aged 23)	N/A
-	F	Viktor Tišler	5 ft 11 in (180 cm)	187 lb (85 kg)	November 30, 1941 (aged 22)	N/A
-	F	Vinko Valentar	-	-	March 21, 1934 (aged 29)	(Socialist Federal Republic of Yugoslavia) HK Jesenice

== Sources ==
- Duplacey, James (1998). Total Hockey: The official encyclopedia of the National Hockey League. Total Sports. ISBN 0-8362-7114-9.
- Podnieks, Andrew (2010). IIHF Media Guide & Record Book 2011. Moydart Pres.
- Hockey Hall Of Fame page on the 1964 Olympics
- Wallechinsky, David (1988). The Complete Book of the Olympics. Penguin Books. pp. 614. ISBN 0-14-010771-1.
