= List of Olympic men's ice hockey players for Hungary =

The list of Olympic men's ice hockey players for Hungary consists of 32 skaters and 6 goaltenders. Men's ice hockey tournaments have been staged at the Olympic Games since 1920 (it was introduced at the 1920 Summer Olympics, and was permanently added to the Winter Olympic Games in 1924). Hungary has participated in three tournaments: 1928, 1936 and 1964. Hungary has never won a medal in ice hockey, with their highest finish being seventh in 1936.

Two players, Miklós Barcza and Sandro Magyar played in more than one tournament, representing Hungary at both the 1928 and 1936 Winter Olympics, and therefore played in the most games, with 9 each. Sándor Miklós scored the most goals (8) and had the most points (9), while Viktor Zsitva had the most assists (2), though assists were not often recorded in the early Olympics.

== Key ==
General terms
Term	Definition
GP	Games played
Olympics	Number of Olympic Games tournaments
Ref(s)	Reference(s)

Goaltender statistical abbreviations
Abbreviation	Definition
W	Wins
L	Losses
T	Ties
Min	Minutes played
SO	Shutouts
GA	Goals against
GAA	Goals against average

Skater statistical abbreviations
Abbreviation	Definition
G	Goals
A	Assists
P	Points
PIM	Penalty minutes

== Goaltenders ==
Goaltenders
Player	Olympics	Tournament(s)	GP	W	L	T	Min	SO	GA	GAA	Notes	Ref(s)
István Csák	1	1936	–	–	–	–	–	–	–	–		
Tibor Heinrich	1	1928	–	–	–	–	–	–	–	–		
György Losonczi	1	1964	–	–	–	–	–	–	–	–		
Ferenc Monostori	1	1936	–	–	–	–	–	–	–	–		
Béla Ordódy	1	1928	–	–	–	–	–	–	–	–		
Mátyás Vedres	1	1964	–	–	–	–	–	–	–	–		

== Skaters ==
Skaters
Player	Olympics	Tournaments	GP	G	A	P	PIM	Notes	Ref(s)
Jozsef Baban	1	1964	8	0	0	0	4		
Árpad Bánkuti	1	1964	8	4	0	4	2		
Miklós Barcza	2	1928, 1936	9	0	0	0	2		
Frigyes Barna	1	1928	3	0	0	0	0		
Janos Beszteri	1	1964	8	2	0	2	0		
Péter Bikár	1	1964	8	1	1	2	2		
Gábor Boróczi	1	1964	7	0	0	0	4		
József de Révay	1	1928	3	0	0	0	0		
Mátyás Farkas	1	1936	1	0	0	0	0		
András Gergely	1	1936	2	0	0	0	0		
László Gergely	1	1936	4	0	0	0	0		
Béla Háray	1	1936	5	4	0	4	0		
Frigyes Helmeczi	1	1936	1	0	0	0	0		
László Jakabházy	1	1964	4	0	0	0	0		
Zoltán Jeney	1	1936	5	1	0	1	0		
József Kertész	1	1964	6	0	0	0	0		
Lajos Koutny	1	1964	8	0	0	0	8		
Péter Krempels	1	1928	2	0	0	0	0		
István Krepuska	1	1928	2	0	0	0	0		
Géza Lator	1	1928	3	0	0	0	0		
Ferenc Lőrincz	1	1964	7	0	0	0	0		
Sandro Magyar	2	1928, 1936	9	3	0	3	2		
Sándor Miklós	1	1936	6	8	1	9	0		
Károly Orosz	1	1964	8	0	0	0	2		
György Raffa	1	1964	8	0	0	0	6		
László Róna	1	1936	6	1	0	1	0		
György Rozgonyi	1	1964	8	4	1	5	0		
Béla Schwalm	1	1964	7	3	0	3	0		
Ferenc Szamosi	1	1936	6	0	0	0	0		
Béla Weiner	1	1928	3	1	0	1	0		
János Ziegler	1	1964	6	0	0	0	0		
Viktor Zsitva	1	1964	8	1	2	3	0		
