= Italy at the 1964 Winter Olympics =

- IOC code: ITA
- NOC: Italian National Olympic Committee
- Website: www.coni.it (in Italian)

in Innsbruck
- Competitors: 61 (53 men, 8 women) in 9 sports
- Flag bearer: Eugenio Monti (Bobsleigh)
- Medals Ranked 12th: Gold 0 Silver 1 Bronze 3 Total 4

Winter Olympics appearances (overview)
- 1924; 1928; 1932; 1936; 1948; 1952; 1956; 1960; 1964; 1968; 1972; 1976; 1980; 1984; 1988; 1992; 1994; 1998; 2002; 2006; 2010; 2014; 2018; 2022; 2026

Italy competed at the 1964 Winter Olympics in Innsbruck, Austria. They brought 61 competitors, 53 of whom were men and 8 of whom were women. A total of 4 medals were won, including 1 silver and 3 bronze.

== Medalists ==
| Medal | Name | Sport | Event |
|---|---|---|---|
| Silver | Sergio Zardini; Romano Bonagura | Bobsleigh | Two-man |
| Bronze | Eugenio Monti; Sergio Siorpaes | Bobsleigh | Two-man |
| Bronze | Eugenio Monti; Sergio Siorpaes; Benito Rigoni; Gildo Siorpaes | Bobsleigh | Four-man |
| Bronze | Walter Ausserdorfer; Sigisfredo Mair | Luge | Men's doubles |

== Alpine skiing ==
Men

| Athlete | Event | Race | |
| Athlete | Event | Time | Rank |
|---|---|---|---|
| Martino Fill | Downhill | 2:27.33 | 27 |
| Bruno Alberti | Downhill | 2:25.30 | 23 |
| Paride Milianti | Downhill | 2:23.01 | 21 |
| Ivo Mahlknecht | Downhill | 2:22.72 | 19 |
| Felice De Nicolò | Giant Slalom | 1:59.62 | 28 |
| Italo Pedroncelli | Giant Slalom | 1:55.14 | 18 |
| Ivo Mahlknecht | Giant Slalom | 1:54.26 | 16 |
| Paride Milianti | Giant Slalom | 1:52.87 | 13 |

Men's slalom

| Athlete | Qualifying | | | | Final | | | | | |
| Athlete | Time 1 | Rank | Time 2 | Rank | Time 1 | Rank | Time 2 | Rank | Total | Rank |
|---|---|---|---|---|---|---|---|---|---|---|
| Ivo Mahlknecht | 1:16.97 | 74 | 55.78 | 7 QF | 1:13.69 | 13 | 1:04.54 | 16 | 2:18.23 | 15 |
| Martino Fill | 56.43 | 34 | 56.32 | 11 QF | 1:14.53 | 20 | 1:05.10 | 20 | 2:19.63 | 20 |
| Paride Milianti | 54.67 | 18 QF | – | – | 1:13.50 | 10 | 1:04.90 | 19 | 2:18.40 | 17 |
| Italo Pedroncelli | 54.22 | 14 QF | – | – | 1:13.94 | 16 | 1:02.38 | 11 | 2:16.32 | 11 |

Women

| Athlete | Event | Race 1 | | Race 2 | | Total | |
| Athlete | Event | Time | Rank | Time | Rank | Time | Rank |
|---|---|---|---|---|---|---|---|
| Inge Senoner | Downhill | | | | | 2:04.22 | 31 |
| Lidia Barbieri Sacconaghi | Downhill | | | | | 2:03.38 | 25 |
| Pia Riva | Downhill | | | | | 2:02.25 | 18 |
| Giustina Demetz | Downhill | | | | | 2:01.20 | 11 |
| Lidia Barbieri Sacconaghi | Giant Slalom | | | | | 2:02.73 | 28 |
| Patrizia Medail | Giant Slalom | | | | | 1:59.29 | 19 |
| Giustina Demetz | Giant Slalom | | | | | 1:56.52 | 14 |
| Pia Riva | Giant Slalom | | | | | 1:54.59 | 9 |
| Giustina Demetz | Slalom | DSQ | – | – | – | DSQ | – |
| Inge Senoner | Slalom | n/a | ? | DSQ | – | DSQ | – |
| Lidia Barbieri Sacconaghi | Slalom | 53.39 | 27 | 55.84 | 21 | 1:49.23 | 22 |
| Pia Riva | Slalom | 46.65 | 11 | 50.55 | 11 | 1:37.20 | 9 |

== Bobsleigh ==
| Sled | Athletes | Event | Run 1 | | Run 2 | | Run 3 | | Run 4 | | Total | |
| Sled | Athletes | Event | Time | Rank | Time | Rank | Time | Rank | Time | Rank | Time | Rank |
|---|---|---|---|---|---|---|---|---|---|---|---|---|
| ITA-1 | Eugenio Monti; Sergio Siorpaes | Two-man | 1:05.94 | 5 | 1:04.90 | 1 | 1:05.41 | 4 | 1:06.38 | 6 | 4:22.63 | 3rd place, bronze medalist(s) |
| ITA-2 | Sergio Zardini; Romano Bonagura | Two-man | 1:05.63 | 3 | 1:05.13 | 3 | 1:05.21 | 2 | 1:06.05 | 2 | 4:22.02 | 2nd place, silver medalist(s) |

| Sled | Athletes | Event | Run 1 | | Run 2 | | Run 3 | | Run 4 | | Total | |
| Sled | Athletes | Event | Time | Rank | Time | Rank | Time | Rank | Time | Rank | Time | Rank |
|---|---|---|---|---|---|---|---|---|---|---|---|---|
| ITA-1 | Sergio Zardini; Sergio Mocellini; Ferruccio Dalla Torre; Romano Bonagura | Four-man | 1:03.95 | 6 | 1:04.10 | 6 | 1:03.59 | 1 | 1:04.25 | 4 | 4:15.89 | 4 |
| ITA-2 | Eugenio Monti; Sergio Siorpaes; Benito Rigoni; Gildo Siorpaes | Four-man | 1:03.43 | 2 | 1:04.07 | 5 | 1:04.02 | 4 | 1:04.08 | 2 | 4:15.60 | 3rd place, bronze medalist(s) |

== Cross-country skiing ==
Men

| Event | Athlete | Race | |
| Event | Athlete | Time | Rank |
|---|---|---|---|
| 15 km | Marcello de Dorigo | 55:26.1 | 27 |
| 15 km | Giulio Deflorian | 53:31.7 | 18 |
| 15 km | Giuseppe Steiner | 52:28.0 | 12 |
| 15 km | Franco Nones | 52:18.0 | 10 |
| 30 km | Livio Stuffer | 1'38:11.0 | 22 |
| 30 km | Gianfranco Stella | 1'35:01.1 | 18 |
| 30 km | Giuseppe Steiner | 1'33:59.8 | 16 |
| 30 km | Marcello De Dorigo | 1'33:53.4 | 15 |
| 50 km | Angelo Genuin | DNF | – |
| 50 km | Franco Manfroi | 2'53:56.5 | 19 |
| 50 km | Eugenio Mayer | 2'53:21.3 | 18 |
| 50 km | Livio Stuffer | 2'51:04.7 | 13 |

Men's 4 × 10 km relay

| Athletes | Race | |
| Athletes | Time | Rank |
|---|---|---|
| Giuseppe Steiner; Marcello de Dorigo; Giulio Deflorian; Franco Nones | 2'21:16.8 | 5 |

== Figure skating ==
Men

| Athlete | CF | FS | Points | Places | Rank |
|---|---|---|---|---|---|
| Giordano Abbondati | 11 | 16 | 1688.4 | 131 | 14 |

Women

| Athlete | CF | FS | Points | Places | Rank |
|---|---|---|---|---|---|
| Sandra Brugnera | 27 | 23 | 1612.5 | 221 | 26 |

== Ice hockey ==
=== First round ===
Winners (in bold) qualified for the Group A to play for 1st-8th places. Teams, which lost their qualification matches, played in Group B for 9th-16th places.

| Team 1 | Score | Team 2 |
|---|---|---|
| **Sweden** | 12–2 | Italy |

=== Consolation round ===
| Rank | Team | Pld | W | L | T | GF | GA | Pts |
|---|---|---|---|---|---|---|---|---|
| 9 | Poland | 7 | 6 | 1 | 0 | 40 | 13 | 12 |
| 10 | Norway | 7 | 5 | 2 | 0 | 40 | 19 | 10 |
| 11 | Japan | 7 | 4 | 2 | 1 | 35 | 31 | 9 |
| 12 | Romania | 7 | 3 | 3 | 1 | 31 | 28 | 7 |
| 13 | Austria | 7 | 3 | 3 | 1 | 24 | 28 | 7 |
| 14 | Yugoslavia | 7 | 3 | 3 | 1 | 29 | 37 | 7 |
| 15 | Italy | 7 | 2 | 5 | 0 | 24 | 42 | 4 |
| 16 | Hungary | 7 | 0 | 7 | 0 | 14 | 39 | 0 |

- Italy 6-4 Hungary
- Yugoslavia 5-3 Italy
- Norway 9-2 Italy
- Poland 7-0 Italy
- Austria 5-3 Italy
- Romania 6-2 Italy
- Italy 8-6 Japan

| **Contestants**; Giancarlo Agazzi; Isidoro Alverà; Enrico Bacher; Enrico Benedetti; Vittorio Bolla; Giampiero Branduardi; Alberto Darin; Gianfranco Darin; Bruno Frison; Roberto Gamper; Bruno Ghedina; Ivo Ghezze; Francesco Macchietto; Giovanni Mastel; Giulio Oberhammer; Edmondo Rabanser; Giulio Verocai |

== Luge ==
Men

| Athlete | Run 1 | | Run 2 | | Run 3 | | Run 4 | | Total | |
| Athlete | Time | Rank | Time | Rank | Time | Rank | Time | Rank | Time | Rank |
|---|---|---|---|---|---|---|---|---|---|---|
| Giovanni Graber | 56.44 | 24 | 1:01.66 | 26 | 54.80 | 16 | 55.50 | 19 | 3:48.40 | 23 |
| Walter Ausserdorfer | 55.47 | 21 | 55.02 | 16 | 54.85 | 18 | 54.83 | 16 | 3:40.17 | 16 |
| Giampaolo Ambrosi | 54.31 | 15 | 54.50 | 14 | 54.96 | 19 | 55.29 | 18 | 3:39.06 | 15 |
| Carlo Prinoth | 53.01 | 8 | 53.36 | 12 | 53.70 | 10 | 53.42 | 6 | 3:33.49 | 7 |

(Men's) Doubles

| Athletes | Run 1 | | Run 2 | | Total | |
| Athletes | Time | Rank | Time | Rank | Time | Rank |
|---|---|---|---|---|---|---|
| Walter Ausserdorfer; Sigisfredo Mair | 51.40 | 4 | 51.47 | 3 | 1:42.87 | 3rd place, bronze medalist(s) |
| Giampaolo Ambrosi; Giovanni Graber | 51.54 | 5 | 52.23 | 6 | 1:43.77 | 5 |

Women

| Athlete | Run 1 | | Run 2 | | Run 3 | | Run 4 | | Total | |
| Athlete | Time | Rank | Time | Rank | Time | Rank | Time | Rank | Time | Rank |
|---|---|---|---|---|---|---|---|---|---|---|
| Erika Außersdorfer | 56.03 | 15 | DNF | – | – | – | – | – | DNF | – |
| Erica Prugger | 55.24 | 12 | 1:27.28 | 13 | 54.98 | 11 | 55.69 | 12 | 4:13.19 | 13 |

== Nordic combined ==
Events:

- normal hill ski jumping (Three jumps, best two counted and shown here.)
- 15 km cross-country skiing

| Athlete | Event | Ski Jumping | | | | Cross-country | | | Total | |
| Athlete | Event | Distance 1 | Distance 2 | Points | Rank | Time | Points | Rank | Points | Rank |
|---|---|---|---|---|---|---|---|---|---|---|
| Ezio Damolin | Individual | 65.0 | 62.0 | 198.1 | 18 | 51:42.3 | 221.44 | 7 | 419.54 | 8 |
| Enzo Perin | Individual | 68.0 | 61.5 | 200.4 | 15 | 54:17.7 | 191.42 | 17 | 391.82 | 18 |

== Ski jumping ==
Athletes performed three jumps, the best two were counted and are shown here.

| Athlete | Event | Jump 1 | | Jump 2 | | Total | |
| Athlete | Event | Distance | Points | Distance | Points | Points | Rank |
|---|---|---|---|---|---|---|---|
| Bruno De Zordo | Normal hill | 68.5 | 88.5 | 72.0 | 96.6 | 185.1 | 46 |
| Nilo Zandanel | Normal hill | 72.0 | 95.9 | 72.0 | 95.6 | 191.5 | 37 |
| Giacomo Aimoni | Normal hill | 72.0 | 96.9 | 74.0 | 100.4 | 197.3 | 28 |
| Nilo Zandanel | Large hill | 87.5 | 100.7 | 81.5 | 96.7 | 197.4 | 25 |
| Giacomo Aimoni | Large hill | 88.0 | 102.3 | 86.0 | 103.6 | 205.9 | 13 |

== Speed skating ==
Men

| Event | Athlete | Race | |
| Event | Athlete | Time | Rank |
|---|---|---|---|
| 500 m | Elio Locatelli | 43.1 | 31 |
| 1500 m | Elio Locatelli | 2:19.0 | 35 |
| 1500 m | Renato De Riva | 2:15.7 | 21 |
| 5000 m | Renato De Riva | 7:57.5 | 14 |
| 10,000 m | Renato De Riva | 16:57.5 | 18 |
