= Hungary at the 1964 Winter Olympics =

- IOC code: HUN
- NOC: Hungarian Olympic Committee
- Website: www.olimpia.hu (in Hungarian and English)

in Innsbruck, Austria January 29-February 9, 1964
- Competitors: 28 (22 men and 6 women) in 6 sports
- Flag bearer: Lajos Koutny
- Medals: Gold 0 Silver 0 Bronze 0 Total 0

Winter Olympics appearances (overview)
- 1924; 1928; 1932; 1936; 1948; 1952; 1956; 1960; 1964; 1968; 1972; 1976; 1980; 1984; 1988; 1992; 1994; 1998; 2002; 2006; 2010; 2014; 2018; 2022; 2026

Hungary competed at the 1964 Winter Olympics in Innsbruck, Austria.

== Alpine skiing ==
Women

Athlete	Event	Race 1		Race 2		Total	
Athlete	Event	Time	Rank	Time	Rank	Time	Rank
Ildikó Szendrődi-Kővári	Downhill					2:22.22	43
Ildikó Szendrődi-Kővári	Giant Slalom					2:19.24	41
Ildikó Szendrődi-Kővári	Slalom	55.86	29	59.05	26	1:54.91	26

== Cross-country skiing ==
Women

Event	Athlete	Race	
Event	Athlete	Time	Rank
5 km	Katalin Hemrik	21:26.7	29
10 km	Mária Tarnai	48:18.9	30
10 km	Éva Balázs	46:04.7	19

Women's 3 x 5 km relay

Athletes	Race	
Athletes	Time	Rank
Éva Balázs; Mária Tarnai; Katalin Hemrik	1'10:16.3	8

== Figure skating ==
Men

Athlete	CF	FS	Points	Places	Rank
Jenő Ébert	22	18	1586.9	188	21

Women

Athlete	CF	FS	Points	Places	Rank
Zsuzsa Almássy	20	14	1702.2	159	17

== Ice hockey ==
=== First round ===
Winners (in bold) qualified for the Group A to play for 1st-8th places. Teams, which lost their qualification matches, played in Group B for 9th-16th places.

Team 1	Score	Team 2
**Soviet Union**	19–1	Hungary

=== Consolation round ===
Rank	Team	Pld	W	L	T	GF	GA	Pts
9	Poland	7	6	1	0	40	13	12
10	Norway	7	5	2	0	40	19	10
11	Japan	7	4	2	1	35	31	9
12	Romania	7	3	3	1	31	28	7
13	Austria	7	3	3	1	24	28	7
14	Yugoslavia	7	3	3	1	29	37	7
15	Italy	7	2	5	0	24	42	4
16	Hungary	7	0	7	0	14	39	0

- Italy 6-4 Hungary
- Austria 3-0 Hungary
- Poland 6-2 Hungary
- Norway 5-1 Hungary
- Yugoslavia 4-2 Hungary
- Japan 6-2 Hungary
- Romania 8-3 Hungary

Competitors

- Mátyás Vedres
- György Losonczi
- József Babán
- József Kertész
- Lajos Koutny
- György Raffa
- János Ziegler
- Árpad Bánkuti
- György Rozgonyi
- Viktor Zsitva
- Petér Bikár
- Ferenc Lörincz
- János Beszteri-Balogh
- Karoly Orosz
- Béla Schwalm
- László Jakabházy
- Gábor Boróczi
- Head coach: György Pasztor

== Ski jumping ==
Athletes performed three jumps, the best two were counted and are shown here.

Athlete	Event	Jump 1		Jump 2		Total	
Athlete	Event	Distance	Points	Distance	Points	Points	Rank
László Gellér	Normal hill	74.5	97.9	72.0	91.6	189.5	42
László Csávás	Normal hill	69.0	86.1	67.0	84.8	170.9	52
László Csávás	Large hill	74.0	83.9	71.0	85.9	169.8	49
László Gellér	Large hill	82.0	95.3	77.5	92.1	187.4	34

== Speed skating ==
Men

Event	Athlete	Race	
Event	Athlete	Time	Rank
500 m	György Ivánkai	44.3	40
500 m	Mihály Martos	44.0	37
1500 m	Mihály Martos	2:26.8	50
1500 m	György Ivánkai	2:19.9	38
5000 m	Mihály Martos	8:47.1	41
5000 m	György Ivánkai	8:19.4	26
10,000 m	György Ivánkai	17:47.3	33

Women

Event	Athlete	Race	
Event	Athlete	Time	Rank
500 m	Kornélia Ihász	50.9	25
1500 m	Kornélia Ihász	2:35.1	20
3000 m	Kornélia Ihász	5:41.4	18
