= Romania at the 1964 Winter Olympics =

- IOC code: ROU (RUM used at these Games)
- NOC: Romanian Olympic and Sports Committee
- Website: www.cosr.ro (in Romanian, English, and French)

in Innsbruck
- Competitors: 27 (men) in 4 sports
- Flag bearer: Ion Panțuru
- Medals: Gold 0 Silver 0 Bronze 0 Total 0

Winter Olympics appearances (overview)
- 1928; 1932; 1936; 1948; 1952; 1956; 1960; 1964; 1968; 1972; 1976; 1980; 1984; 1988; 1992; 1994; 1998; 2002; 2006; 2010; 2014; 2018; 2022; 2026

Romania competed at the 1964 Winter Olympics in Innsbruck, Austria. The nation returned to the Winter Games after having boycotted the 1960 Winter Olympics due to the U.S. ban imposed to East Germany.

== Biathlon ==
Men

| Event | Athlete | Time | Misses | Adjusted time ^{1} | Rank |
|---|---|---|---|---|---|
| 20 km | Nicolae Bărbăşescu | DNF | – | – | DNF |
| 20 km | Gheorghe Cimpoia | 1'29:44.6 | 3 | 1'35:44.6 | 27 |
| 20 km | Constantin Carabela | 1'30:59.0 | 0 | 1'30:59.0 | 14 |
| 20 km | Vilmoş Gheorghe | 1'22:18.0 | 2 | 1'26:18.0 | 5 |

^{1} Two minutes added per miss.

== Bobsleigh ==
| Sled | Athletes | Event | Run 1 | | Run 2 | | Run 3 | | Run 4 | | Total | |
| Sled | Athletes | Event | Time | Rank | Time | Rank | Time | Rank | Time | Rank | Time | Rank |
|---|---|---|---|---|---|---|---|---|---|---|---|---|
| ROU-1 | Ion Panţuru; Hariton Pașovschi | Two-man | 1:07.74 | 17 | 1:06.97 | 10 | 1:06.92 | 12 | 1:07.47 | 14 | 4:29.10 | 13 |
| ROU-2 | Alexandru Oancea; Constantin Cotacu | Two-man | 1:07.31 | 13 | 1:08.93 | 18 | 1:06.75 | 10 | 1:07.26 | 12 | 4:30.25 | 15 |

| Sled | Athletes | Event | Run 1 | | Run 2 | | Run 3 | | Run 4 | | Total | |
| Sled | Athletes | Event | Time | Rank | Time | Rank | Time | Rank | Time | Rank | Time | Rank |
|---|---|---|---|---|---|---|---|---|---|---|---|---|
| ROU-1 | Ion Panţuru; Gheorghe Maftei; Constantin Cotacu; Hariton Pașovschi | Four-man | 1:04.70 | 15 | 1:04.89 | 15 | 1:05.05 | 12 | 1:05.16 | 13 | 4:19.80 | 15 |

== Cross-country skiing ==
Men

| Event | Athlete | Race | |
| Event | Athlete | Time | Rank |
|---|---|---|---|
| 15 km | Gheorghe Bădescu | 56:29.6 | 39 |
| 30 km | Gheorghe Bădescu | 1'46:54.5 | 54 |

== Ice hockey ==
=== First round ===
Winners (in bold) qualified for the Group A to play for 1st-8th places. Teams, which lost their qualification matches, played in Group B for 9th-16th places.

| Team 1 | Score | Team 2 |
|---|---|---|
| **United States** | 7–2 | Romania |

=== Consolation round ===
| Rank | Team | Pld | W | L | T | GF | GA | Pts |
|---|---|---|---|---|---|---|---|---|
| 9 | Poland | 7 | 6 | 1 | 0 | 40 | 13 | 12 |
| 10 | Norway | 7 | 5 | 2 | 0 | 40 | 19 | 10 |
| 11 | Japan | 7 | 4 | 2 | 1 | 35 | 31 | 9 |
| 12 | Romania | 7 | 3 | 3 | 1 | 31 | 28 | 7 |
| 13 | Austria | 7 | 3 | 3 | 1 | 24 | 28 | 7 |
| 14 | Yugoslavia | 7 | 3 | 3 | 1 | 29 | 37 | 7 |
| 15 | Italy | 7 | 2 | 5 | 0 | 24 | 42 | 4 |
| 16 | Hungary | 7 | 0 | 7 | 0 | 14 | 39 | 0 |

- Poland 6-1 Romania
- Japan 6-4 Romania
- Romania 5-5 Yugoslavia
- Austria 2-5 Romania
- Norway 4-2 Romania
- Romania 6-2 Italy
- Romania 8-3 Hungary

| **Contestants**; Nicolae Andrei; Anton Biro; Anton Crișan; Zoltan Czaka; Ion Ferenz; Iulian Florescu; Andrei Ioanovici; Ştefan Ionescu; Alexandru Calamar; Dan Mihăilescu; Adalbert Naghi; Eduard Pană; Iosef Sofian; Geza Szabo; Iuliu Szabo; Ion Țiriac; Dezső Varga |
