= Ferenc Lőrincz =

Ferenc Lőrincz may refer to:

- Ferenc Lőrincz (ice hockey)
- Ferenc Lőrincz (speed skater)
