= Vedres =

Vedres is a surname. Notable people with the surname include:

- Mátyás Vedres (1943–2009), Hungarian ice hockey player
- Nicole Védrès (1911–1965), French author
