= Kawabuchi =

Kawabuchi (written: 川淵 or 河淵) is a Japanese surname. Notable people with the surname include:

- Isao Kawabuchi (河淵 勲, born 1936), Japanese ice hockey player
- Ryōki Kawabuchi (川淵 龍起, 1860–1941), Japanese politician
- Saburō Kawabuchi (川淵 三郎, born 1936), Japanese footballer and manager
- Tsutomu Kawabuchi (河渕 務, 1925–2014), Japanese ice hockey player, coach and administrator
