= Verocai =

- Pronunciation: pronounced [veroˈkai]

Origin
- Origin: Ladin language
- Region of origin: Ladinia

Verocai is a surname, and may refer to:

Verocai is a patronymic derived from the toponym of the Verocai's frazione situated in the comune Cortina d'Ampezzo.

- Arthur Verocai - Brazilian composer, singer, and producer
- Giulio Verocai - Italian ice hockey player
