= György Rozgonyi =

György Rozgonyi may refer to:

- György Rozgonyi (fencer) (1890–1967), Hungarian fencer
- György Rozgonyi (ice hockey) (born 1943), Hungarian ice hockey player
