= Kimio =

- Gender: Male

Origin
- Origin: Japanese
- Meaning: Different meanings depending on the kanji used

Kimio (written: 公雄, 公郎, 公生, 規三生, 喜民夫, 喜美雄 or きみお in hiragana) is a masculine Japanese given name. Notable people with the name include:

- Kimio Eto (衛藤 公雄), Japanese musician
- Kimio Kazahari (風張 喜民夫; born 1936), Japanese ice hockey player
- Kimio Sugimoto (杉本 公雄; born 1957), Japanese volleyball player
- Kimio Yabuki (矢吹 公郎), Japanese animator
- Kimio Yada (矢田 喜美雄; 1913–1990), Japanese high jumper
- Kimio Yamada (山田 規三生; born 1972), Japanese Go player
- Kimio Yanagisawa (柳沢 きみお; born 1948), Japanese manga artist
