= Alverà =

Alverà is an Italian surname. Notable people with the surname include:

- Albino Alverà (1923–2004), Italian alpine skier
- Claudia Alverà (born 1966), Italian curler
- Eleonora Alverà (born 1982), Italian curler
- Fabio Alverà (born 1959), Italian curler and curling coach
- Giorgio Alverà (1943–2013), Italian bobsledder
- Isidoro Alverà (born 1945), Italian ice hockey player
- Marco Alverà (born 1975), Italian businessman
- Massimo Alverà (born 1957), Italian curler
- Michele Alverà (1929–1991), Italian bobsledder
- Nella Alverà (born 1930), Italian curler
- Renzo Alverà (1933–2005), Italian bobsledder
- Silvio Alverà (1921–1986), Italian alpine skier

== Places ==
- Alverà, Italy, a frazione in Cortina d'Ampezzo, Veneto, Italy
