= Parolini =

Parolini is a surname. Notable people with the surname include:

- Alberto Parolini (1788–1867), Italian naturalist and botanist
- Giacomo Parolini (1663–1733), Italian painter
- Gianfranco Parolini (1925–2018), Italian film director
- Marilù Parolini (1931–2012), Italian photographer and screenwriter
- Pio Parolini (born 1940), Swiss ice hockey player
