= Adolf Bachura =

Austrian ice hockey player

Personal information
- Nationality: Austrian
- Born: 10 April 1933; Vienna, Austria
- Died: 25 April 2017 (aged 84)

Sport
- Sport: Ice hockey

Adolf Bachura (10 April 1933 – 25 April 2017) was an Austrian ice hockey player. He competed in the men's tournament at the 1964 Winter Olympics.
