= Peter Wespi =

Swiss ice hockey player

- Born: March 22, 1943; Pfäffikon, Switzerland
- Died: October 5, 2015 (aged 72)
- Height: 5 ft 8 in (173 cm)
- Weight: 163 lb (74 kg; 11 st 9 lb)
- National team: Switzerland
- Playing career: 1964–1964

Peter Wespi (March 22, 1943 – October 5, 2015) was a Swiss professional ice hockey player who represented the Swiss national team at the 1964 Winter Olympics.
