= Tassilo Neuwirth =

Austrian ice hockey player

Personal information
- Nationality: Austrian
- Born: 15 December 1940 Vienna, Austria
- Died: January 2023 (aged 82)

Sport
- Sport: Ice hockey

Tassilo Neuwirth (15 December 1940 – January 2023) was an Austrian ice hockey player. He competed in the men's tournament at the 1964 Winter Olympics.
