= Roger Chappot =

Swiss ice hockey player (1940–2020)

- Born: October 17, 1940; Martigny, Switzerland
- Died: 7 April 2020 (aged 79); Switzerland
- Height: 5 ft 9 in (175 cm)
- Weight: 165 lb (75 kg; 11 st 11 lb)
- Position: Defence
- Played for: HC Villars; Genève-Servette HC
- National team: Switzerland
- Playing career: 1958–1976

Roger Chappot (17 October 1940 – 7 April 2020) was a Swiss professional ice hockey player.

He played for HC Villars and Genève-Servette HC in the National League A. He also represented the Swiss national team at the 1964 Winter Olympics.

Chappot died on 8 April 2020, at the age of 79, from complications of COVID-19 during the COVID-19 pandemic in Switzerland.
