= Kurt Pfammatter =

Swiss ice hockey player (1941–2022)

- Born: 30 March 1941; Visp, Switzerland
- Died: 24 July 2022 (aged 81); Brig, Switzerland
- Height: 5 ft 10 in (178 cm)
- Weight: 159 lb (72 kg; 11 st 5 lb)
- Position: Forward
- National team: Switzerland
- Playing career: 1964–1965

Kurt Pfammatter (30 March 1941 – 24 July 2022) was a Swiss professional ice hockey player.

In 1962, Pfammatter helped HC Viège to win the Swiss national championship, scoring two goals in 20 seconds in a decisive match against Davos. He represented the Switzerland national team at the 1964 Winter Olympics. He died in hospital at Brigue, aged 81.

After retiring from his sporting career, Pfammatter ran a hotel-restaurant near the Litterna-Halle stadium at Visp.
