= Herold Truffer =

Swiss ice hockey player (1936–2024)

- Born: 14 July 1936; Eyholz, Switzerland
- Died: 5 April 2024 (aged 87)
- Height: 5 ft 9 in (175 cm)
- Weight: 163 lb (74 kg; 11 st 9 lb)
- Played for: EHC Visp
- National team: Switzerland
- Playing career: 1957–1970

Herold Truffer (14 July 1936 – 5 April 2024) was a Swiss professional ice hockey player who represented the Switzerland national team at the 1964 Winter Olympics. Truffer died on 5 April 2024, at the age of 87.
