= Marijan Kristan =

Slovenian ice hockey player

Personal information
- Nationality: Slovenian
- Born: July 16, 1937; Jesenice, Yugoslavia
- Died: 12 November 2006 (aged 69); Jesenice, Slovenia

Sport
- Sport: Ice hockey

Marijan Kristan (16 July 1937 – 12 November 2006) was a Slovenian ice hockey player. He competed in the men's tournament at the 1964 Winter Olympics.
