= Albert Loibl =

German ice hockey player

Personal information
- Nationality: German
- Born: 20 November 1937 (age 87); Oberau, Germany

Sport
- Sport: Ice hockey

Albert Loibl (born 20 November 1937) is a German ice hockey player. He competed in the men's tournament at the 1964 Winter Olympics.
