= Otto Wittwer =

Swiss ice hockey player

- Born: December 24, 1937 (age 87) Langnau im Emmental, Switzerland
- Height: 5 ft 5 in (165 cm)
- Weight: 181 lb (82 kg; 12 st 13 lb)
- Position: Forward
- National team: Switzerland
- Playing career: 1962–1964

Otto Wittwer (born December 24, 1937) is a retired Swiss professional ice hockey player who represented the Swiss national team at the 1964 Winter Olympics.
