= René Kiener =

Swiss ice hockey player

- Born: May 21, 1938 (age 88) Bern, Switzerland
- Height: 5 ft 9 in (175 cm)
- Weight: 163 lb (74 kg; 11 st 9 lb)
- Position: Goaltender
- National team: Switzerland
- Playing career: 1955–1973

René Kiener (born May 21, 1938) is a former Swiss professional ice hockey goaltender who represented the Swiss national team at the 1964 Winter Olympics.
