= Horst Kakl =

Austrian ice hockey player

Personal information
- Nationality: Austrian
- Born: 16 January 1942 (age 83); Moravany, South Moravia, Czechoslovakia

Sport
- Sport: Ice hockey

Horst Kakl (born 16 January 1942) is an Austrian ice hockey player. He competed in the men's tournament at the 1964 Winter Olympics.
