= Peter Schwimmbeck =

German ice hockey player

Personal information
- Nationality: German
- Born: 14 September 1941 (age 83); Füssen, Germany

Sport
- Sport: Ice hockey

Peter Schwimmbeck (born 14 September 1941) is a German ice hockey player. He competed in the men's tournament at the 1964 Winter Olympics.
