= Gary Schmalzbauer =

American ice hockey player

- Born: January 27, 1940 (age 86) Saint Paul, MN, USA
- Height: 5 ft 9 in (175 cm)
- Weight: 161 lb (73 kg; 11 st 7 lb)
- Position: Left wing
- National team: United States
- Playing career: 1959–1969

Gary Owen Schmalzbauer (born January 27, 1940) is an American former ice hockey forward and Olympian.

Schmalzbauer played with Team USA at the 1964 Winter Olympics held in Innsbruck, Austria. He also played for the Rochester Mustangs in the United States Hockey League.
