= Georg Scholz (ice hockey) =

German ice hockey player (born 1937)

Personal information
- Nationality: German
- Born: 24 June 1937 (age 88) Füssen, Germany

Sport
- Sport: Ice hockey

Georg Scholz (born 24 June 1937) is a German ice hockey player. He competed in the men's tournament at the 1964 Winter Olympics.
