= Friedrich Turek =

Austrian ice hockey player

Personal information
- Nationality: Austrian
- Born: 24 July 1940 (age 85) Vienna, Austria

Sport
- Sport: Ice hockey

Friedrich Turek (born 24 July 1940) is an Austrian ice hockey player. He competed in the men's tournament at the 1964 Winter Olympics.
