= Erich Romauch =

Austrian ice hockey player (1939–2020)

Personal information
- Nationality: Austrian
- Born: 18 July 1939; Klagenfurt, Austria
- Died: 23 September 2020 (aged 81); Klagenfurt, Austria

Sport
- Sport: Ice hockey

Erich Romauch (18 July 1939 – 23 September 2020) was an Austrian ice hockey player. He competed in the men's tournament at the 1964 Winter Olympics.
