= Helmut Zanghellini =

German ice hockey player

Personal information
- Nationality: German
- Born: 16 December 1939 (age 85); Füssen, Germany

Sport
- Sport: Ice hockey

Helmut Zanghellini (born 16 December 1939) is a German ice hockey player. He competed in the men's tournament at the 1964 Winter Olympics.
