= Jiro Ogawa =

Japanese ice hockey player

Personal information
- Nationality: Japanese
- Born: 20 January 1939 (age 86)

Sport
- Sport: Ice hockey

Jiro Ogawa (小川 次郎, Ogawa Jirō, born 20 January 1939) is a Japanese ice hockey player. He competed in the men's tournament at the 1964 Winter Olympics.
