= Christian Kirchberger =

Austrian ice hockey player

Personal information
- Nationality: Austrian
- Born: 20 January 1944 (age 81)

Sport
- Sport: Ice hockey

Christian Kirchberger (born 20 January 1944) is an Austrian ice hockey player. He competed in the men's tournament at the 1964 Winter Olympics.
