= Mirko Holbus =

Serbian ice hockey player

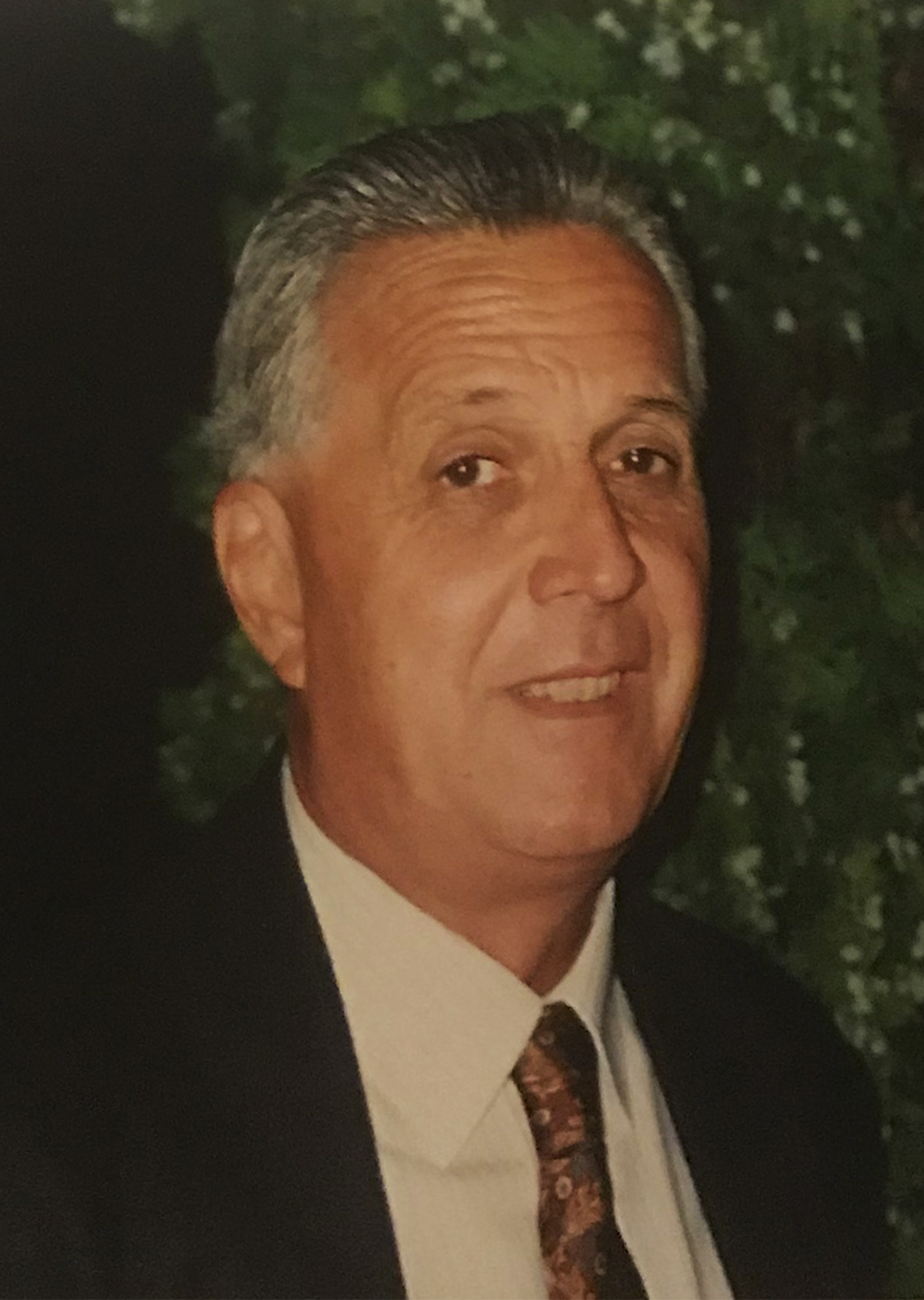
- Mirko Holbus (1940-2015) Serbian hockey player and Yugoslav representative in hockey.

Personal information
- Nationality: Serbian
- Born: 26 January 1940; Zemun, Kingdom of Yugoslavia
- Died: 15 January 2015 (aged 74); Belgrade, Serbia

Sport
- Sport: Ice hockey

Mirko Holbus (Serbian Cyrillic: Мирко Холбус; 26 January 1940 – 15 January 2015) was a Serbian ice hockey player. He competed in the men's tournament at the 1964 Winter Olympics.
