= Oskar Jenni =

Swiss ice hockey player

- Born: June 17, 1939; Switzerland
- Died: July 5, 2020 (aged 81)
- Height: 5 ft 10 in (178 cm)
- Weight: 163 lb (74 kg; 11 st 9 lb)
- Played for: HC Davos
- National team: Switzerland
- Playing career: 1961–1964

Oskar Jenni (June 17, 1939 – July 5, 2020) was a Swiss professional ice hockey player who played for HC Davos in the National League A. He also represented the Swiss national team at the 1964 Winter Olympics.
