= Vinko Valentar =

Slovenian ice hockey player

Personal information
- Nationality: Slovenian
- Born: 21 March 1934 (age 91); Jesenice, Yugoslavia

Sport
- Sport: Ice hockey

Vinko Valentar (born 21 March 1934) is a Slovenian ice hockey player. He competed in the men's tournament at the 1964 Winter Olympics.
