= Peter Stammbach =

Swiss ice hockey player

- Born: November 27, 1937 (age 87); Bern, Switzerland
- Height: 5 ft 10 in (178 cm)
- Weight: 176 lb (80 kg; 12 st 8 lb)
- Position: Centre
- National team: Switzerland
- Playing career: 1953–1973

Peter Stammbach (born November 27, 1937) is a retired Swiss professional ice hockey player who represented the Swiss national team at the 1964 Winter Olympics.
