= Rauno Lehtiö =

Finnish ice hockey player (1942–2026)

Personal information
- Nationality: Finnish
- Born: 3 March 1942 Tampere, Finland
- Died: 9 March 2026 (aged 84) Tampere, Finland

Sport
- Sport: Ice hockey

Rauno Lehtiö (3 March 1942 – 9 March 2026) was a Finnish ice hockey player. He competed in the men's tournament at the 1964 Winter Olympics. Lehtiö died in Tampere on 9 March 2026, at the age of 84.
