= Rolf Diethelm =

Swiss ice hockey player

- Born: May 15, 1940 (age 84); Bern, Switzerland
- Height: 5 ft 9 in (175 cm)
- Weight: 181 lb (82 kg; 12 st 13 lb)
- Position: Right wing
- National team: Switzerland
- Playing career: 1958–1964

Rolf Diethelm (born May 15, 1940) is a retired Swiss professional ice hockey player who represented the Swiss national team at the 1964 Winter Olympics.
