= Jürg Zimmermann =

Swiss ice hockey player

- Born: January 1, 1943 (age 82); Bern, Switzerland
- Height: 5 ft 11 in (180 cm)
- Weight: 165 lb (75 kg; 11 st 11 lb)
- National team: Switzerland
- Playing career: 1964–1964

Jürg Zimmermann (born January 1, 1943) is a retired Swiss professional ice hockey player who represented the Swiss national team at the 1964 Winter Olympics.
