= Hiroyuki Matsuura =

Japanese ice hockey player

Personal information
- Nationality: Japanese
- Born: 18 August 1937 (age 88)

Sport
- Sport: Ice hockey

Hiroyuki Matsuura (松浦 弘幸, Matsuura Hiroyuki; born 18 August 1937) is a Japanese ice hockey player. He competed in the men's tournament at the 1964 Winter Olympics.
