= Wayne Meredith =

American ice hockey player

- Born: October 4, 1939 (age 87) South Bend, Indiana, U.S.
- Height: 5 ft 9 in (175 cm)
- Weight: 178 lb (81 kg; 12 st 10 lb)
- Position: Defense
- National team: United States
- Playing career: 1954–1969

Wayne Brent Meredith (born October 4, 1939) is an American former ice hockey defenseman and Olympian.

Meredith played with Team USA at the 1964 Winter Olympics held in Innsbruck, Austria. He played for the University of Minnesota and for the St. Paul Saints of the International Hockey League.
