= Igor Radin =

Serbian ice hockey player

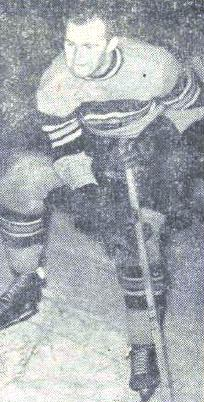
- Igor Radin in 1962

Personal information
- Nationality: Yugoslav (Serbian / Slovenian)
- Born: 1 May 1938; Novi Sad, Yugoslavia
- Died: 20 September 2014 (aged 76); Ljubljana, Slovenia

Sport
- Sport: Rowing; Ice hockey

Igor Radin (1 May 1938 – 20 September 2014) was a Yugoslav ice hockey player. He competed in the men's tournament at the 1964 Winter Olympics. He was also a rower, and took part in the Coxed Four event at the 1960 Summer Olympics.

== See also ==
- List of athletes who competed in both the Summer and Winter Olympic games
