= Sylvester Wackerle (ice hockey) =

German ice hockey player (born 1937)

Personal information
- Full name: Sylvester Wackerle Jr.
- Nationality: German
- Born: 26 April 1937 (age 88) Garmisch-Partenkirchen, Germany

Sport
- Sport: Ice hockey

Sylvester Wackerle (born 26 April 1937) is a German ice hockey player. He competed in the men's tournament at the 1964 Winter Olympics.
