= Franz Berry =

Swiss ice hockey player

- Born: 21 November 1938; Davos, Switzerland
- Died: 6 July 2009 (aged 70); Davos, Switzerland
- Height: 5 ft 11 in (180 cm)
- Weight: 175 lb (79 kg; 12 st 7 lb)
- Position: Forward
- National team: Switzerland
- Playing career: 1956–1963

Franz Berry (21 November 1938 – 6 July 2009) was a Swiss ice hockey player who played for the Swiss national team at the 1956 and 1964 Winter Olympics. He was born in Davos, Switzerland.
