= Fritz Wechselberger =

Austrian ice hockey player

Personal information
- Nationality: Austrian
- Born: 9 September 1938; Innsbruck, Austria
- Died: 30 December 2015 (aged 77)

Sport
- Sport: Ice hockey

Fritz Wechselberger (9 September 1938 – 30 December 2015) was an Austrian ice hockey player. He competed in the men's tournament at the 1964 Winter Olympics.
