= Jake McCoy =

American ice hockey player (1942–2021)

- Born: January 2, 1942 Minneapolis, Minnesota, U.S.
- Died: February 5, 2021 (aged 79)
- Height: 5 ft 9 in (175 cm)
- Weight: 181 lb (82 kg; 12 st 13 lb)
- Position: Defense
- National team: United States
- Playing career: 1956–1964

Thomas James "Jake" McCoy (January 2, 1942 – February 5, 2021) was an American ice hockey defenseman and Olympian.

== Career ==
McCoy played with Team USA at the 1964 Winter Olympics held in Innsbruck, Austria. He later played one year for the Minnesota Nationals in the United States Hockey League before going on to a career as a high school teacher, during which he coached high school hockey teams including that of Richfield High School.

== Death ==
He died one month and three days after his 79th birthday.
