= Max Rüegg (ice hockey) =

Swiss ice hockey player

- Born: March 12, 1942 (age 83); Bern, Switzerland
- Height: 6 ft 0 in (183 cm)
- Weight: 172 lb (78 kg; 12 st 4 lb)
- Position: Defence
- National team: Switzerland
- Playing career: 1963–1965

Max Rüegg (born March 12, 1942) is a retired Swiss professional ice hockey player who represented the Swiss national team at the 1964 Winter Olympics.
