= Gustav Tischer =

Austrian ice hockey player (1932–1990)

Personal information
- Nationality: Austrian
- Born: 20 December 1932 Vienna, Austria
- Died: 11 October 1990 (aged 57)

Sport
- Sport: Ice hockey

Gustav Tischer (20 December 1932 – 11 October 1990) was an Austrian ice hockey player. He competed in the men's tournament at the 1964 Winter Olympics. Tischer died on 11 October 1990, at the age of 57.
