= Eduard Mössmer =

Austrian ice hockey player

Personal information
- Nationality: Austrian
- Born: 21 February 1934
- Died: 20 April 2007 (aged 73)

Sport
- Sport: Ice hockey

Eduard Mössmer (21 February 1934 – 20 April 2007) was an Austrian ice hockey player. He competed in the men's tournament at the 1964 Winter Olympics.
