= Miklós Barcza =

Hungarian ice hockey player (1908–1948)

- Born: 7 January 1908; Budapest, Austria-Hungary
- Died: 11 July 1948 (aged 40); Budapest, Hungary
- Position: Defence
- National team: Hungary
- Playing career: 1927–1941

Miklós Barcza (7 January 1908 – 11 July 1948) was a Hungarian ice hockey player. He played for the Hungarian national team at the 1928 and 1936 Winter Olympics and at the World Championships.
