= Marcello De Dorigo =

Italian cross-country skier (1937–2024)

Personal information
- Nationality: Italian
- Born: 2 June 1937; Rocca Pietore, Italy
- Died: 9 September 2024 (aged 87)

Sport
- Sport: Cross-country skiing

Marcello De Dorigo (2 June 1937 – 9 September 2024) was an Italian cross-country skier. He competed at the 1960 Winter Olympics and the 1964 Winter Olympics.

De Dorigo died on 9 September 2024, at the age of 87.
