= Anton Biró =

Romanian ice hockey player

Personal information
- Nationality: Romanian
- Born: 30 September 1939 (age 85); Miercurea Ciuc, Romania

Sport
- Sport: Ice hockey

Anton Biró (born 30 September 1939) is a Romanian ice hockey player. He competed in the men's tournament at the 1964 Winter Olympics.
