= Gábor Boróczi =

Hungarian ice hockey player (1939–1991)

- Born: April 2, 1939; Budapest, Hungary
- Died: May 2, 1991 (aged 52); Budapest, Hungary
- Height: 5 ft 9 in (175 cm)
- Weight: 168 lb (76 kg; 12 st 0 lb)
- Position: Forward
- Played for: Újpesti TE
- National team: Hungary
- NHL draft: Undrafted
- Playing career: 1956–1969

Gábor Boróczi (April 2, 1939 – May 2, 1991) was a former Hungarian ice hockey player. He played for the Hungary men's national ice hockey team at the 1964 Winter Olympics in Innsbruck.
