= Pio Parolini =

Swiss ice hockey player

- Born: February 19, 1940 St. Moritz, Switzerland
- Died: November 11, 2023 (aged 83)
- Height: 5 ft 7 in (170 cm)
- Weight: 163 lb (74 kg; 11 st 9 lb)
- Played for: Zürcher SC; EHC Basel
- National team: Switzerland
- Playing career: 1960–1977

Pio Parolini (February 19, 1940 – November 11, 2023) was a Swiss professional ice hockey player who played for Zürcher SC in the National League A. He also represented the Swiss national team at the 1964 Winter Olympics.
