= Adalbert Naghi =

Romanian ice hockey player

Personal information
- Nationality: Romanian
- Born: 3 February 1933 (age 92); Cluj-Napoca, Romania

Sport
- Sport: Ice hockey

Adalbert Naghi (born 3 February 1933) is a Romanian ice hockey player. He competed in the men's tournament at the 1964 Winter Olympics.
