= Miran Krmelj =

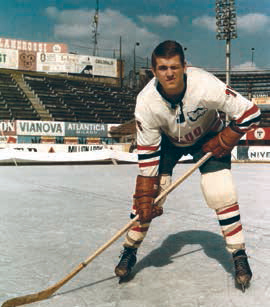

Personal information
- Born: 23 February 1941 Jesenice, Slovenia
- Died: 2 March 2009 (aged 68) Zagreb, Croatia

Sport
- Sport: Ice hockey
- Club: KHL Medveščak Zagreb

Miran Krmelj (23 February 1941 – 2 March 2009) was a Yugoslav ice hockey defender. Between 1963 and 1976 he played 40 international matches, including five at the 1964 Winter Olympics.

Krmelj was raised by his elder sister, as his father was killed during World War II in 1943 and his mother died when he was 13 years old. He played for 20 years with KHL Medveščak Zagreb and then worked for the City of Zagreb. Later he founded a travel agency, which specialized in transporting athletes to sports events. The son of his sister, Zvone Šuvak, also became an Olympic ice hockey player.
