= Jan Roar Thoresen =

Norwegian ice hockey player

Jan Roar Thoresen (born 24 March 1940) is a Norwegian ice hockey player. He played for the club Vålerengens IF and for the Norwegian national ice hockey team. He participated at the Winter Olympics in 1964, where he placed tenth with the Norwegian team.
