= Jiří Dolana =

- Born: March 16, 1937 Hradec Králové, Czechoslovakia
- Died: July 14, 2003 (aged 66)
- Position: Right wing
Medal record
Representing (Czechoslovakia)
Men's Ice Hockey
Bronze medal – third place	1964 Innsbruck	Team

Jiří Dolana (March 16, 1937 – July 14, 2003) was a Czeck ice hockey winger who played for the Czechoslovak national team. He won a bronze medal at the 1964 Winter Olympics.
