= Ivo Ghezze =

Italian ice hockey player

Personal information
- Nationality: Italian
- Born: 4 March 1941; Cortina d'Ampezzo, Italy
- Died: 27 December 1993 (aged 52)

Sport
- Sport: Ice hockey

Ivo Ghezze (4 March 1941 – 27 December 1993) was an Italian ice hockey player. He competed in the men's tournament at the 1964 Winter Olympics.
