= Andrei Ioanovici =

Romanian ice hockey player

Personal information
- Nationality: Romanian
- Born: 8 July 1942 (age 82); Miercurea Ciuc, Romania

Sport
- Sport: Ice hockey

Andrei Ioanovici (born 8 July 1942) is a Romanian ice hockey player. He competed in the men's tournament at the 1964 Winter Olympics.
