= Sándor Miklós =

Hungarian ice hockey player (1915–1981)

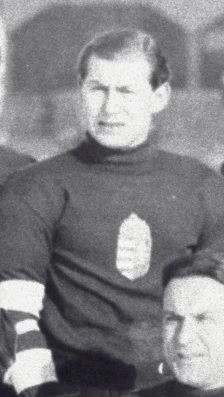
- A portrait of Sándor Miklós
- Born: 5 March 1915; Budapest, Austria-Hungary
- Died: 24 April 1981 (aged 66)
- Position: Centre
- Shot: Right
- Played for: Budapesti Korcsolyázó Egylet
- National team: Hungary
- Playing career: 1930–1946

Sándor Miklós (5 March 1915 – 24 April 1981) was a Hungarian ice hockey player. He played for the Hungarian national team at the 1936 Winter Olympics and several World Championships.

To this day, Miklós remains the youngest goalscorer of the World Championships, scoring on 1 February 1931 in a First Round fixture of the 1931 edition, played in Krynica, Poland during a 1:4 defeat to Czechoslovakia, when he was less than 16 years old.
