= Kimihisa Kudo =

Japanese ice hockey player

Personal information
- Nationality: Japanese
- Born: 6 September 1939 (age 86) Hokkaido, Japan

Sport
- Sport: Ice hockey

Kimihisa Kudo (工藤 公久, Kudō Kimihisa; born 6 September 1939) is a Japanese former ice hockey player. He competed in the men's tournaments at the 1964 Winter Olympics and the 1968 Winter Olympics.
