= Józef Stefaniak =

Polish ice hockey player

- Born: 14 March 1941 (age 84); Piątek, Nazi Germany
- Height: 5 ft 6 in (168 cm)
- Weight: 165 lb (75 kg; 11 st 11 lb)
- Position: Forward
- Played for: Boruta Zgierz; Gryf Toruń; Pomorzanin Toruń; ŁKS Łódź; EHC Lustenau
- National team: Poland
- Playing career: 1956–1980

Józef Stefaniak (born 14 March 1941) is a Polish former ice hockey forward who played professionally for Boruta Zgierz, Gryf Toruń, Pomorzanin Toruń, ŁKS Łódź and EHC Lustenau. He also played for the men's national team at the 1964 Winter Olympics and for multiple world championships.
