= Edmondo Rabanser =

Italian ice hockey player

Personal information
- Nationality: Italian
- Born: 3 November 1936; Ortisei, Italy
- Died: 25 May 2016 (aged 79)

Sport
- Sport: Ice hockey

Edmondo Rabanser (3 November 1936 – 25 May 2016) was an Italian ice hockey player. He competed in the men's tournament at the 1964 Winter Olympics.
