= Dan Mihăilescu =

Romanian ice hockey player

Personal information
- Nationality: Romanian
- Born: 2 July 1945 (age 81) Bucharest, Romania

Sport
- Sport: Ice hockey

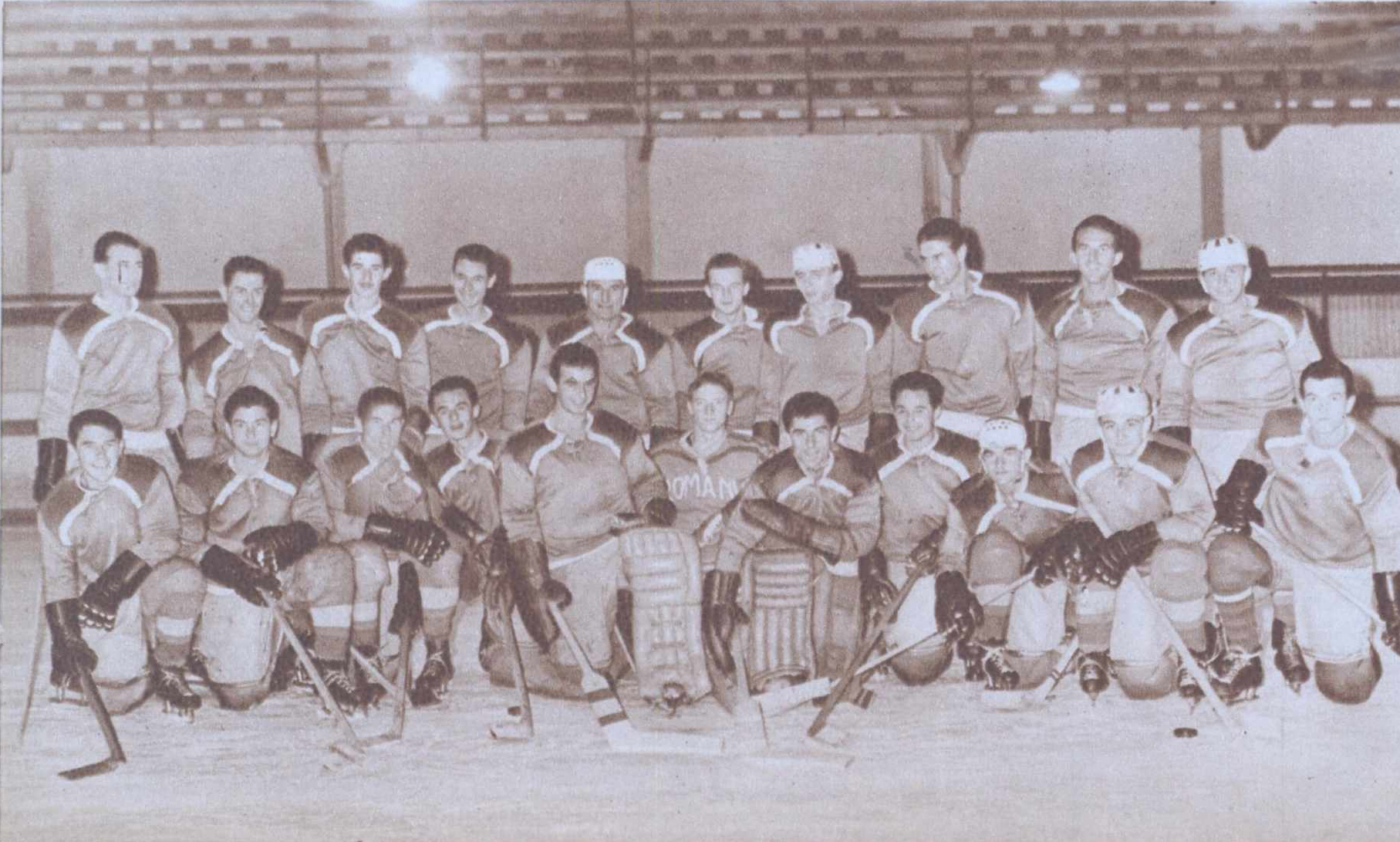
Hockey team. Above: Zoltán Făgăraș, Takacs, Răzvan Schiau, Dan Mihăilescu, Zoltan Czaka, Andrei Ioanovici, Alexandru Calamar, Anton Biro, Naghi, Ștefan Ionescu.

Dan Mihăilescu (born 2 July 1945) is a Romanian ice hockey player. He competed in the men's tournament at the 1964 Winter Olympics.
