= Gheorghe Bădescu =

Romanian cross-country skier (born 1937)

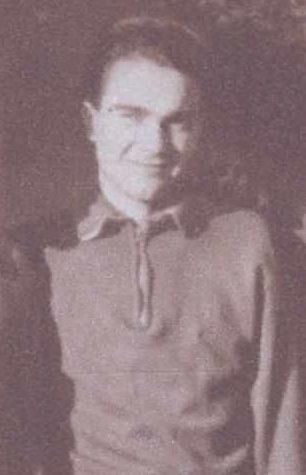
- Gheorghe Bădescu in 1963

Personal information
- Nationality: Romanian
- Born: 6 September 1937 (age 88) Fundata, Romania

Sport
- Sport: Cross-country skiing

Gheorghe Bădescu (born 6 September 1937) is a Romanian cross-country skier. He competed in the men's 15 kilometre event at the 1964 Winter Olympics.
