= Gerard Langner =

Polish ice hockey player

- Born: February 15, 1943 (age 82); Szopienice, Nazi Germany
- Height: 5 ft 11 in (180 cm)
- Weight: 187 lb (85 kg; 13 st 5 lb)
- Position: Defence
- Played for: Start Katowice; Baildon Katowice; Legia Warsaw
- National team: Poland
- Playing career: 1957–1964

Gerard Langner (born 15 February 1943) is a Polish former ice hockey player. He played for Start Katowice, Baildon Katowice, and Legia Warsaw during his career. He also played for the Polish national team at the 1964 Winter Olympics.
