= Iosef Sofian =

Romanian ice hockey player

Personal information
- Nationality: Romanian
- Born: 1939 (age 86–87)

Sport
- Sport: Ice hockey

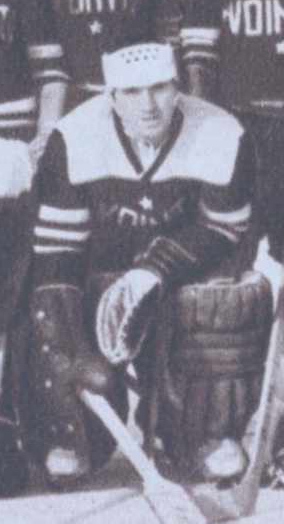
Sofian in 1963

Iosef Sofian (born 1939) is a Romanian ice hockey player. He competed in the men's tournament at the 1964 Winter Olympics.
