= Giovanni Mastel =

Italian ice hockey player (1943–2021)

Personal information
- Nationality: Italian
- Born: 6 May 1943; Belluno, Italy
- Died: 21 December 2021 (aged 78)

Sport
- Sport: Ice hockey

Giovanni Mastel (6 May 1943 – 21 December 2021) was an Italian ice hockey player. He competed in the men's tournament at the 1964 Winter Olympics. Mastel died on 21 December 2021, at the age of 78.
