= Anton Crișan =

Romanian ice hockey player

Personal information
- Nationality: Romanian
- Born: 17 January 1942 Sebeș, Romania
- Died: 9 March 2012 (aged 70)

Sport
- Sport: Ice hockey

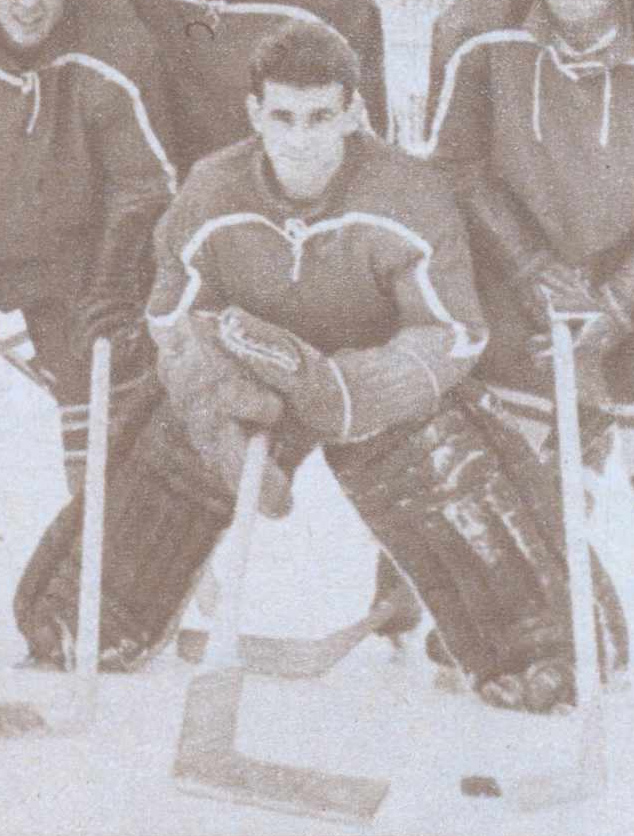
Anton Crișan (1963)

Anton Crișan (17 January 1942 – 9 March 2012) was a Romanian ice hockey player. He competed in the men's tournament at the 1964 Winter Olympics.
