= Nicolae Andrei =

Romanian ice hockey player (born 1939)

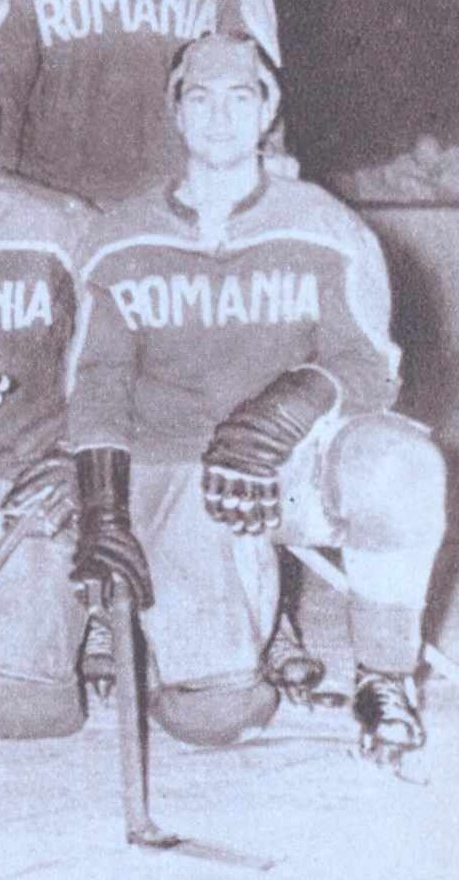

Personal information
- Nationality: Romanian
- Born: 8 December 1939 (age 85); Miercurea Ciuc, Romania

Sport
- Sport: Ice hockey

Nicolae Andrei (born 8 December 1939) is a Romanian ice hockey player. He competed in the men's tournament at the 1964 Winter Olympics.
