= Lidia Barbieri Sacconaghi =

Italian alpine skier (1945–2002)

Personal information
- Nationality: Italian
- Born: 1 January 1945; Milan, Italy
- Died: 11 April 2002 (aged 57)

Sport
- Sport: Alpine skiing

Lidia Barbieri Sacconaghi (1 January 1945 – 11 April 2002) was an Italian alpine skier. She competed in three events at the 1964 Winter Olympics.
