= Hubert Sitko =

Polish ice hockey player

- Born: 26 December 1939 (age 85); Katowice, Nazi Germany
- Height: 5 ft 7 in (170 cm)
- Weight: 154 lb (70 kg; 11 st 0 lb)
- Position: Defence
- Played for: Start Katowice; GKS Katowice
- National team: Poland
- Playing career: 1954–1970

Hubert Sitko (born 26 December 1939) is a Polish former ice hockey player. He played for Start Katowice and GKS Katowice during his career. With GKS Katowice Sitko won the Polish hockey league championship four times. He also played for the Polish national team at four World Championships as well as the 1964 Winter Olympics.
