= Katsuji Morishima =

Japanese ice hockey player

Personal information
- Nationality: Japanese
- Born: 22 October 1942 (age 82); Hokkaido, Japan

Sport
- Sport: Ice hockey

Katsuji Morishima (森島 勝司, Morishima Katsuji, born 22 October 1942) is a Japanese ice hockey player. He competed in the men's tournaments at the 1964 Winter Olympics and the 1968 Winter Olympics.
