= Isao Kawabuchi =

Japanese ice hockey player

Personal information
- Nationality: Japanese
- Born: 13 December 1936 (age 88)

Sport
- Sport: Ice hockey

Isao Kawabuchi (河淵 勲, Kawabuchi Isao, born 13 December 1936) is a Japanese ice hockey player. He competed in the men's tournament at the 1964 Winter Olympics.
