= Kimio Kazahari =

Japanese ice hockey player

Personal information
- Nationality: Japanese
- Born: 18 February 1936 (age 89); Hachinohe, Japan

Sport
- Sport: Ice hockey

Kimio Kazahari (風張 喜民夫, Kazahari Kimio, born 18 February 1936) is a Japanese ice hockey player. He competed in the men's tournament at the 1964 Winter Olympics.
