= Livio Stuffer =

Italian cross-country skier

Personal information
- Nationality: Italian
- Born: 4 August 1935 (age 89); Ortisei, Italy

Sport
- Sport: Cross-country skiing

Livio Stuffer (born 4 August 1935) is an Italian cross-country skier. He competed at the 1960 Winter Olympics, the 1964 Winter Olympics and the 1968 Winter Olympics.
