= Ion Ferenz =

Romanian ice hockey player

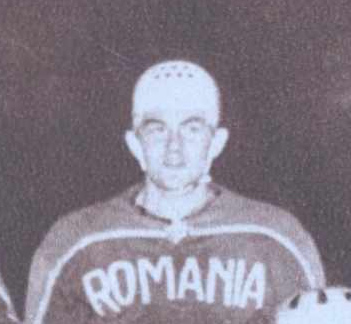
- Ion Ferenczi in 1963

Personal information
- Nationality: Romanian
- Born: 10 June 1932; Miercurea Ciuc, Romania
- Died: 2 October 2003 (aged 71); Budapest, Romania

Sport
- Sport: Ice hockey

Ion Ferenz (10 June 1932 – 2 October 2003) was a Romanian ice hockey player. He competed in the men's tournament at the 1964 Winter Olympics.
