= Roberto Gamper =

Italian ice hockey player

Personal information
- Nationality: Italian
- Born: 31 August 1943 (age 81); Monte Carlo, Monaco

Sport
- Sport: Ice hockey

Roberto Gamper (born 31 August 1943) is an Italian ice hockey player. He competed in the men's tournament at the 1964 Winter Olympics.
