= Bruno Frison =

Italian ice hockey player (1936–2024)

Personal information
- Nationality: Italian
- Born: 14 May 1936; Cortina d'Ampezzo, Italy
- Died: 10 August 2024 (aged 88); Cortina d'Ampezzo, Italy

Sport
- Sport: Ice hockey

Bruno Frison (14 May 1936 – 10 August 2024) was an Italian ice hockey player. He competed in the men's tournament at the 1964 Winter Olympics. During his career he won twelve national championships, and took part in several Ice Hockey World Championships. After his retirement in the 1970s, he kept on collaborating with his national team as an equipment manager until 2006. Frison died in Cortina d'Ampezzo on 10 August 2024, at the age of 88.
