= Enrico Benedetti =

Italian ice hockey player

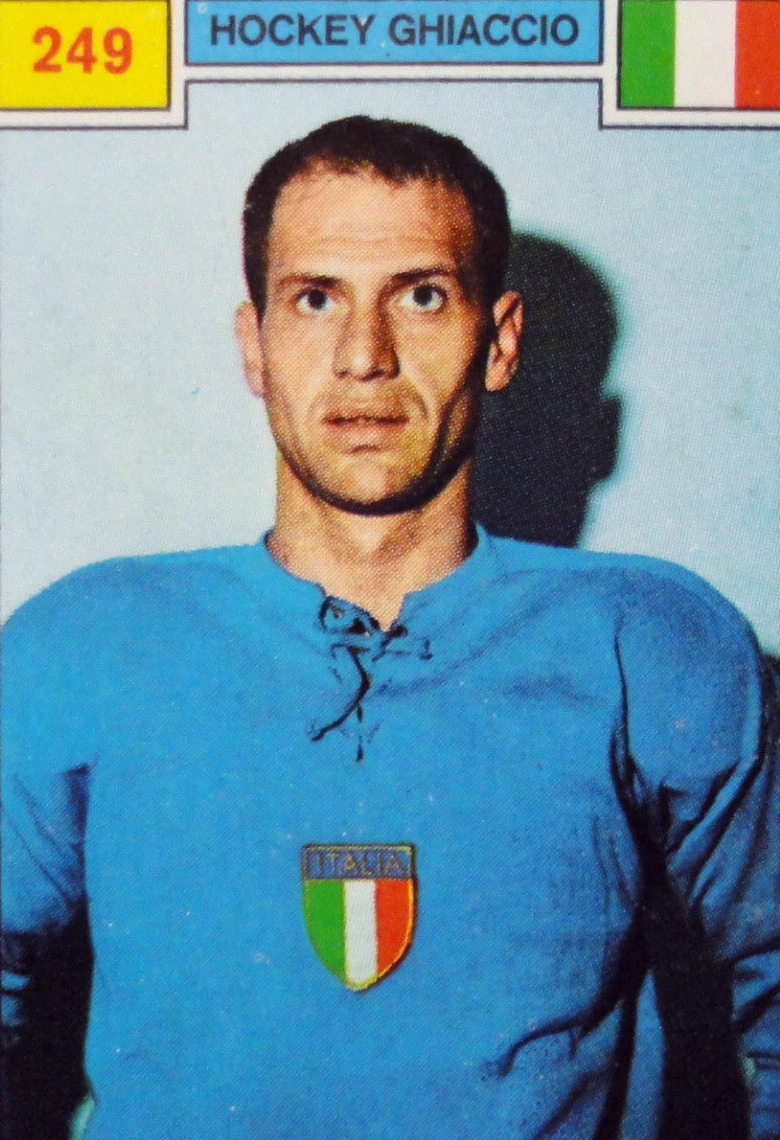
- Born: 16 August 1940; Cortina d'Ampezzo, Italy
- Died: 21 December 1996 (aged 56)
- Position: Forward
- Played for: SG Cortina
- Playing career: 1958–1974

Enrico Benedetti (16 August 1940 – 21 December 1996) was an Italian ice hockey player who competed at the 1964 Winter Olympics. Between 1958 and 1974 he won multiple national titles with SG Cortina.
