= Béla Schwalm =

Hungarian ice hockey player (1941–2008)

- Born: October 25, 1941; Budapest, Hungary
- Died: 2008 (aged 66–67)
- Height: 6 ft 0 in (183 cm)
- Weight: 183 lb (83 kg; 13 st 1 lb)
- Position: Forward
- Played for: Ferencvárosi TC
- National team: Hungary
- NHL draft: Undrafted
- Playing career: 1960–1969

Béla Schwalm (October 25, 1941 – 2008) was a Hungarian ice hockey player. He played for the Hungary men's national ice hockey team at the 1964 Winter Olympics in Innsbruck.
