= Alexandru Calamar =

Romanian ice hockey player

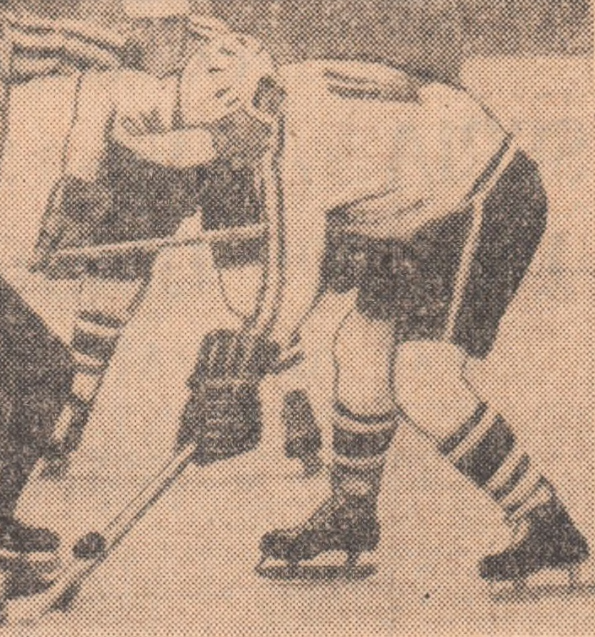

Personal information
- Nationality: Romanian
- Born: 20 June 1941 (age 83); Miercurea Ciuc, Romania

Sport
- Sport: Ice hockey

Alexandru Calamar (born 20 June 1941) is a Romanian ice hockey player. He competed in the men's tournaments at the 1964 Winter Olympics and the 1968 Winter Olympics.
