= György Losonczi =

Hungarian ice hockey player (born 1940)

- Born: September 9, 1940 (age 84); Budapest, Hungary
- Height: 5 ft 9 in (175 cm)
- Weight: 159 lb (72 kg; 11 st 5 lb)
- Position: Goaltender
- Played for: Vörös Meteor Budapest
- National team: Hungary
- NHL draft: Undrafted
- Playing career: ?–?

György Losonczi (born September 9, 1940) is a former Hungarian ice hockey player. He played for the Hungary men's national ice hockey team at the 1964 Winter Olympics in Innsbruck.
