= Zoltan Czaka =

Romanian ice hockey player

Personal information
- Nationality: Romanian
- Born: 2 December 1932 Miercurea Ciuc, Romania
- Died: 12 November 2013 (aged 80)

Sport
- Sport: Ice hockey

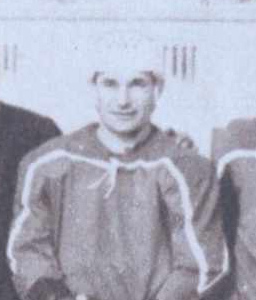
Zoltan Czaka

Zoltan Czaka (2 December 1932 – 12 November 2013) was a Romanian ice hockey player. He competed in the men's tournaments at the 1964 Winter Olympics and the 1968 Winter Olympics.
