= Isidoro Alverà =

Italian ice hockey player

Personal information
- Nationality: Italian
- Born: 2 March 1945 (age 80); Cortina d'Ampezzo, Italy

Sport
- Sport: Ice hockey

Isidoro Alverà (born 2 March 1945) is an Italian ice hockey player. He competed in the men's tournament at the 1964 Winter Olympics.
