= Ștefan Ionescu =

Romanian ice hockey player (1935–2022)

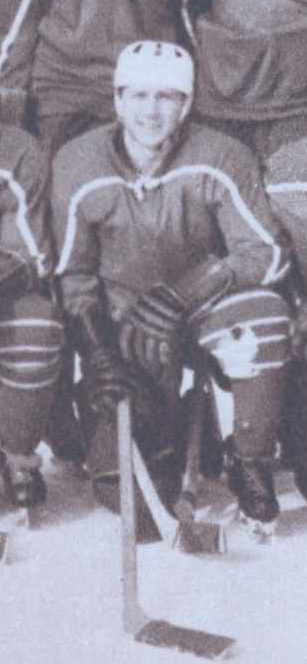

Personal information
- Nationality: Romanian
- Born: 17 February 1935; Bucharest, Romania
- Died: 30 October 2022 (aged 87)

Sport
- Sport: Ice hockey

Ștefan Ionescu (17 February 1935 − 30 October 2022) was a Romanian ice hockey player. He competed in the men's tournaments at the 1964 Winter Olympics and the 1968 Winter Olympics.
