= Károly Orosz =

Hungarian ice hockey player (born 1945)

- Born: 28 January 1945 (age 80); Budapest, Hungary
- Height: 5 ft 9 in (175 cm)
- Weight: 148 lb (67 kg; 10 st 8 lb)
- Position: Forward
- Played for: BVSC Budapest
- National team: Hungary
- NHL draft: Undrafted
- Playing career: 1964–1977

Károly Orosz (born 28 January 1945) is a former Hungarian ice hockey player. He played for the Hungary men's national ice hockey team at the 1964 Winter Olympics in Innsbruck.
