= József Kertész =

Hungarian ice hockey player (1940–2015)

- Born: January 28, 1940
- Died: December 11, 2015 (aged 75)
- Position: Forward
- Played for: BVSC Budapest
- National team: Hungary
- NHL draft: Undrafted
- Playing career: ?–?

József Kertész (January 28, 1940 – December 11, 2015) was a Hungarian ice hockey player. He played for the Hungary men's national ice hockey team at the 1964 Winter Olympics in Innsbruck.
