= Iulian Florescu =

Romanian ice hockey player

Personal information
- Nationality: Romanian
- Born: 23 October 1943 Bucharest, Romania
- Died: 27 April 2011 (aged 67) Bucharest, Romania

Sport
- Sport: Ice hockey

Iulian Florescu (23 October 1943 – 27 April 2011) was a Romanian ice hockey player. He competed in the men's tournaments at the 1964 Winter Olympics and the 1968 Winter Olympics.
