= Enrico Bacher =

Italian ice hockey player (1940–2021)

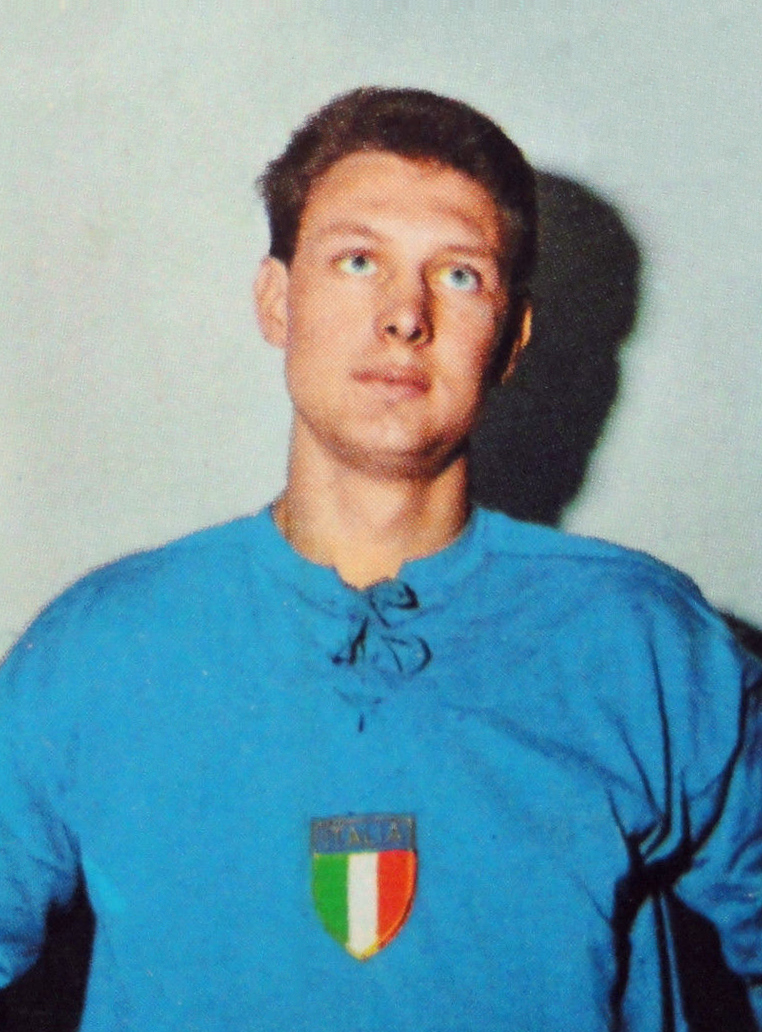
- Bacher before 1969
- Born: 27 December 1940 Ponte Gardena, Italy
- Died: 18 November 2021 (aged 80)
- Played for: HC Bolzano

Enrico "Heini" Bacher (27 December 1940 – 18 November 2021) was an Italian ice hockey player who competed at the 1964 Winter Olympics. He played eight games and scored three goals.

He died on 18 November 2021, at the age of 80.
