= Viktor Zsitva =

Hungarian ice hockey player (born 1939)

- Born: July 14, 1939 (age 85); Budapest, Hungary
- Height: 5 ft 9 in (175 cm)
- Weight: 159 lb (72 kg; 11 st 5 lb)
- Position: Forward
- Played for: Újpesti TE
- National team: Hungary
- Playing career: 1958–1971

Viktor Zsitva (born July 14, 1939) is a former Hungarian ice hockey player. He played for the Hungary men's national ice hockey team at the 1964 Winter Olympics in Innsbruck.
