= György Raffa =

Hungarian ice hockey player (born 1938)

- Born: May 16, 1938 (age 87); Vác, Hungary
- Height: 5 ft 11 in (180 cm)
- Weight: 176 lb (80 kg; 12 st 8 lb)
- Position: Defence
- Played for: Ferencvárosi TC
- National team: Hungary
- NHL draft: Undrafted
- Playing career: 1960–1968

György Raffa (born May 16, 1938) is a former Hungarian ice hockey player. He played for the Hungary men's national ice hockey team at the 1964 Winter Olympics in Innsbruck.
