= János Beszteri-Balogh =

Hungarian ice hockey player (1938–2024)

- Born: 9 August 1938; Heves, Hungary
- Died: 22 January 2024 (aged 85)
- Height: 5 ft 9 in (175 cm)
- Weight: 148 lb (67 kg; 10 st 8 lb)
- Position: Forward
- Played for: Szikra Budapest; Kinizsi SE Budapest; Ferencvárosi TC; Vörös Meteor Budapest
- National team: Hungary
- Playing career: 1955–1970

János Beszteri-Balogh (9 August 1938 – 22 January 2024) was a Hungarian ice hockey player. He played for the Hungary national team at the 1964 Winter Olympics in Innsbruck.

Beszteri-Balogh died on 22 January 2024, at the age of 85.
