= Árpád Bánkuti =

Hungarian ice hockey player (1941–2022)

- Born: 13 May 1941; Budapest, Hungary
- Died: 22 February 2022 (aged 80)
- Height: 5 ft 9 in (175 cm)
- Weight: 170 lb (77 kg; 12 st 2 lb)
- Position: Left wing
- Played for: Budapesti Vasutas SC; Újpesti TE; Volán SC Budapest
- National team: Hungary
- Playing career: 1957–1975

Árpád Bánkuti (13 May 1941 – 22 February 2022) was a Hungarian ice hockey player. He played for the Hungary men's national ice hockey team at the 1964 Winter Olympics in Innsbruck.
