= Geza Szabo =

Romanian ice hockey player

Personal information
- Nationality: Romanian
- Born: 1 December 1940; Miercurea Ciuc, Romania
- Died: 14 April 1993 (aged 52); Miercurea Ciuc, Romania

Sport
- Sport: Ice hockey

Geza Szabo (1 December 1940 – 14 April 1993) was a Romanian ice hockey player. He competed in the men's tournaments at the 1964 Winter Olympics and the 1968 Winter Olympics.
