= Francesco Macchietto =

Italian ice hockey player (1932–2011)

Personal information
- Nationality: Italian
- Born: 31 July 1932; Auronzo di Cadore, Italy
- Died: 8 September 2011 (aged 79); Auronzo di Cadore, Italy

Sport
- Sport: Ice hockey

Francesco Macchietto Riode (31 July 1932 – 8 September 2011) was an Italian ice hockey player. He competed in the men's tournaments at the 1956 Winter Olympics and the 1964 Winter Olympics.
