= József Babán =

Hungarian ice hockey player (born 1935)

- Born: 25 May 1935 (age 91) Csepel, Hungary
- Height: 5 ft 7 in (170 cm)
- Weight: 168 lb (76 kg; 12 st 0 lb)
- Played for: BVSC Budapest
- National team: Hungary
- NHL draft: Undrafted
- Playing career: ?–?

József Babán (born 25 May 1935) is a former Hungarian ice hockey player. He played for the Hungary men's national ice hockey team at the 1964 Winter Olympics in Innsbruck.
