= János Ziegler =

Hungarian ice hockey player (born 1941)

- Born: 6 April 1941 (age 84); Budapest, Hungary
- Height: 5 ft 9 in (175 cm)
- Weight: 154 lb (70 kg; 11 st 0 lb)
- Played for: Vörös Meteor Budapest
- National team: Hungary
- NHL draft: Undrafted
- Playing career: ?–?

János Ziegler (born 6 April 1941) is a former Hungarian ice hockey player. He played for the Hungary men's national ice hockey team at the 1964 Winter Olympics in Innsbruck.
