= Alberto Da Rin =

Italian ice hockey player

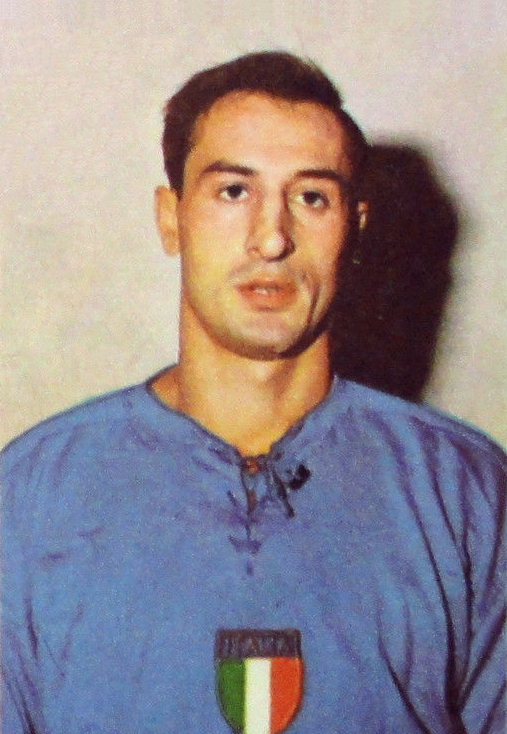
- Da Rin in 1970
- Born: 11 December 1939 (age 85); Cortina d'Ampezzo, Italy
- Height: 166 cm (5 ft 5 in)
- Weight: 70 kg (154 lb; 11 st 0 lb)
- Position: Center
- Shot: Right
- Played for: SG Cortina, Cortina d'Ampezzo
- Playing career: 1956–1978

Alberto Da Rin (born 11 December 1939) is a retired Italian ice hockey player who competed at the 1964 Winter Olympics, alongside his elder brother Gianfranco. He played 8 games and scored 5 goals. His other two brothers Luigino and Arturo also played hockey.
