= Giulio Oberhammer =

Italian ice hockey player

- Born: 14 December 1935 Cortina d'Ampezzo, Italy
- Died: May 24, 2009 (aged 73) Pieve di Cadore, Italy
- Position: Right wing
- Shot: Right
- National team: Italy
- Playing career: 1955–1964

Giulio Oberhammer (b. 14 December 1935 - d. 24 May 2009) is an Italian ice hockey player. He competed in the men's tournaments at the 1956 Winter Olympics and the 1964 Winter Olympics.
