= Giulio Verocai =

Italian ice hockey player

Personal information
- Nationality: Italian
- Born: 31 March 1942 (age 82); Cortina d'Ampezzo, Italy

Sport
- Sport: Ice hockey

Giulio Verocai (born 31 March 1942) is an Italian ice hockey player. He competed in the men's tournament at the 1964 Winter Olympics.
