= Vittorio Bolla =

Italian ice hockey player

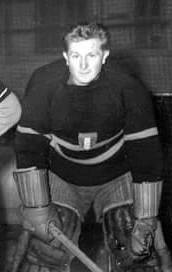

Personal information
- Nationality: Italian
- Born: 12 January 1932; Milan, Italy
- Died: 20 September 2002 (aged 70); Milan, Italy

Sport
- Sport: Ice hockey

Vittorio Luigi Bolla (12 January 1932 – 20 September 2002) was an Italian ice hockey goaltender. He competed in the men's tournaments at the 1956 Winter Olympics and the 1964 Winter Olympics.
