= Giampiero Branduardi =

Italian ice hockey player (1936–2026)

Personal information
- Nationality: Italian
- Born: 28 August 1936 Milan, Italy
- Died: 26 February 2026 (aged 89) Rozzano, Italy

Sport
- Sport: Ice hockey

Giampiero Branduardi (28 August 1936 – 26 February 2026) was an Italian ice hockey player. He competed in the men's tournaments at the 1956 Winter Olympics and the 1964 Winter Olympics. Branduardi died on 26 February 2026, at the age of 89.
