= Ferenc Lőrincz (ice hockey) =

Hungarian ice hockey player (1933–2007)

- Born: January 23, 1933; Budapest, Hungary
- Died: 2007 (aged 73–74)
- Height: 5 ft 9 in (175 cm)
- Weight: 165 lb (75 kg; 11 st 11 lb)
- Position: Forward
- Played for: Kinizsi Budapest; Újpesti TE
- National team: Hungary
- Playing career: 1954–1969

Ferenc Lőrincz (January 23, 1933 – 2007) was a Hungarian ice hockey player. He played for the Hungary men's national ice hockey team at the 1964 Winter Olympics in Innsbruck.
