= Mátyás Vedres =

Hungarian ice hockey player (1943–2009)

- Born: 18 April 1943; Budapest, Hungary
- Died: 23 May 2009 (aged 66)
- Position: Goaltender
- Played for: Újpesti TE
- National team: Hungary
- NHL draft: Undrafted
- Playing career: 1959–1974

Mátyás Vedres (18 April 1943 – 23 May 2009) was a former Hungarian ice hockey goaltender. He played for the Hungary men's national ice hockey team at the 1964 Winter Olympics in Innsbruck.
