= György Rozgonyi (ice hockey) =

Hungarian ice hockey player (born 1943)

- Born: 31 May 1943 (age 81); Budapest, Hungary
- Height: 5 ft 9 in (175 cm)
- Weight: 148 lb (67 kg; 10 st 8 lb)
- Played for: Vörös Meteor Budapest
- National team: Hungary
- NHL draft: Undrafted
- Playing career: ?–?

György Rozgonyi (born 31 May 1943) is a former Hungarian ice hockey player. He played for the Hungary men's national ice hockey team at the 1964 Winter Olympics in Innsbruck.
