= Australia at the 1960 Winter Olympics =

- IOC code: AUS
- NOC: Australian Olympic Committee
- Website: www.olympics.com.au

in Squaw Valley
- Competitors: 31 in 6 sports
- Flag bearer: Vic Ekberg
- Medals: Gold 0 Silver 0 Bronze 0 Total 0

Winter Olympics appearances (overview)
- 1936; 1948; 1952; 1956; 1960; 1964; 1968; 1972; 1976; 1980; 1984; 1988; 1992; 1994; 1998; 2002; 2006; 2010; 2014; 2018; 2022; 2026

Australia competed at the 1960 Winter Olympics in Squaw Valley, United States. This was the first and last time Australia competed in ice hockey and Nordic combined. While ice hockey gave Australia its only top ten finish in this games, the team lost all of their matches, conceding double-digit goals. Australia also competed in alpine skiing, cross-country skiing, and figure skating, where Mervyn Bower and Jacqueline Mason came twelfth in the pairs event.

== Alpine skiing ==
Men

Athlete	Event	Run 1		Run 2		Final/Total		
Athlete	Event	Time	Rank	Time	Rank	Time	Diff	Rank
Peter Brockhoff	Downhill	—N/a				2:39.7	+33.7	57
Peter Brockhoff	Giant slalom	—N/a				Disqualified		
Peter Brockhoff	Slalom	1:27.3	44	1:24.4	29	2:51.7	+42.8	30
Bill Day	Downhill	—N/a				2:30.5	+24.5	52
Bill Day	Giant slalom	—N/a				2:12.2	+23.9	41
Bill Day	Slalom	1:22.1	33	DSQ	–	DSQ	–	–

Women

Athlete	Event	Run 1		Run 2		Final/Total		
Athlete	Event	Time	Rank	Time	Rank	Time	Diff	Rank
Christine Davy	Downhill	—N/a				1:50.6	+13.0	27
Christine Davy	Giant slalom	—N/a				1:50.7	+10.8	32
Christine Davy	Slalom	1:13.1	38	1:04.1	24	2:17.2	+27.6	29

== Cross-country skiing ==
Men

Athlete	Event	Race	
Athlete	Event	Time	Rank
Richard Walpole	15 km	1:06:48.3	51

== Figure skating ==
Athlete(s)	Event	CF	FS	TO	Points	Rank
Bill Cherrell	Men's	19	18	162	1042.3	18
Tim Spencer	Men's	18	11	142	1171.2	17
Aileen Shaw	Ladies'	25	24	221	965.7	25
Mary Wilson	Ladies'	26	26	232	890.2	26
Jackie Mason & Mervyn Bower	Pairs	12	—N/a	83	63.7	12

== Ice hockey ==
Team roster

Name	GP	G	A	PTS	PIM
Ben Acton	5	0	0	0	11
Ronald Amess	5	0	0	0	2
David Cunningham	5	4	2	6	4
Noel Derrick	6	2	1	3	2
Rob Dewhurst	0	0	0	0	0
Vic Ekberg	6	0	2	2	0
Basil Hansen	4	1	0	1	4
Clive Hitch	6	0	0	0	0
Russell Jones	6	2	3	5	4
John Nicholas	6	0	0	0	16
Peter Parrott	4	0	0	0	0
Ken Pawsey	3	0	0	0	0
John Thomas	6	1	0	1	6
Steve Tikal	1	0	0	0	0
Ivo Veseley	2	0	0	0	2
Ken Wellman	6	0	0	0	6

Name	GP	W	T	L	MINS	GA	SO	GAA	A	PIM
Noel McLoughlin	3	0	0	1	120	21	0	10.50	0	0
Robert Reid	5	0	0	5	240	66	0	16.50	0	0

First round
Group C

Pos	Team	Pld	W	L	D	GF	GA	GD	Pts
1	United States	2	2	0	0	19	6	+13	4
2	Czechoslovakia	2	1	1	0	23	8	+15	2
3	Australia	2	0	2	0	2	30	−28	0

February 20, 1960.	Czechoslovakia	18–1 (7–1, 3–0, 8–0)	Australia

Vladimír Nadrchal
Vladimír Dvořáček
Goalies
Robert Reid
Referees:
Bob Barry
Bill Riley

J. Golonka (J. Starsi) – 02:35	1–0
J. Volf – 03:29	2–0
	2–1	05:17 – D. Cunningham (R. Jones, V. Ekberg)
R. Potsch (J. Golonka) – 06:31	3–1
J. Golonka (J. Cerny) – 08:30	4–1
J. Cerny (J. Volf) – 09:30	5–1
J. Starsi (M. Vlach) – 14:30	6–1
J. Cerny (J. Volf) – 15:56	7–1
V. Pantucek (V. Bubnik) – 20:32	8–1
R. Potsch (V. Pantucek) – 22:07	9–1
J. Starsi (K. Gut) – 33:24	10–1
J. Starsi (M. Vlach) – 41:57	11–1
K. Gut (V. Pantucek) – 45:02	12–1
M. Vlach – 45:49	13–1
M. Vlach – 46:42	14–1
V. Bubnik (V. Pantucek) – 49:09	15–1
J. Golonka (M. Vlach, F. Tikal) – 49:45	16–1
M. Vlach (J. Golonka, Jan Kasper) – 53:44	17–1
J. Golonka (R. Potsch) – 54:24	18–1

6 min
Penalties
2 min
82
Shots
15

February 21, 1960.	United States	12–1 (6–0, 3–0, 3–1)	Australia

Jack McCartan
Goalies
Robert Reid
Noel McLoughlin
Referees:
Bill McKenzie
Hugh McLean

W. Olson (P. Johnson, R. Meridith) – 01:09	1–0
R. Rodenheiser (Bob Cleary) – 05:13	2–0
T. Williams – 09:37	3–0
Bob Cleary (Bill Cleary) – 14:07	4–0
R. Meridith (E. Owen) – 16:31	5–0
J. Mayasich – 17:36	6–0
J. Mayasich (T. Williams, R. Christian) – 22:39	7–0
J. Kirrane (E. Owen, R. Paavola) – 29:39	8–0
R. Christian (T. Williams) – 31:23	9–0
	9–1	41:02 – R. Jones (D. Cunningham)
R. Meredith – 42:21	10–1
P. Johnson (J. Mayasich, B. Christian) – 44:10	11–1
E. Owen (B. Christian) – 47:40	12–1

0 min
Penalties
4 min
47
Shots
10

Consolation round

Pos	Team	Pld	W	L	D	GF	GA	GD	Pts
1	Finland	4	3	0	1	50	11	+39	7
2	Japan	4	2	1	1	32	22	+10	5
3	Australia	4	0	4	0	8	57	−49	0

February 22, 1960	Australia	1–14 (1–8, 0–4, 0–2)	Finland

Robert Reid
Noel McLoughlin
Goalies
Juhani Lahtinen
Referees:
Buck Riley
Hiroshi Hayrachi

	0–1	03:25 – J. Seistamo
	0–2	05:19 – R. Kilpio
	0–3	06:21 – P. Nieminen
	0–4	07:51 – E. Luostarinen (J. Seistamo)
	0–5	09:22 – R. Kilpio (J. Wahlsten)
	0–6	15:54 – V. Soini (E. Luostarinen)
	0–7	16:04 – R. Kilpio (K. Rassa)
	0–8	18:07 – P. Nieminen
D. Cunningham – 18:48	1–8
	1–9	23:24 – V. Numminen
	1–10	36:54 – J. Wahlsten
	1–11	37:51 – J. Wahlsten
	1–12	39:19 – E. Luostarinen
	1–13	43:59 – J. Seistamo
	1–14	36:40 – R. Kilpio

6 min
Penalties
6 min
8
Shots
46

February 24, 1960	Australia	2–13 (0–3, 0–4, 2–6)	Japan

Noel McLoughlin
Goalies
Toshiei Honma
Referees:
Buck Riley
Marshall Ryman

	0–1	14:37 – T. Yamada
	0–2	15:21 – H. Inatsu (I. Ono)
	0–3	16:14 – T. Kakihara (M. Takashima, Y. Miyazaki)
	0–4	22:30 – M. Takashima
	0–5	27:27 – Y. Miyazaki
	0–6	31:17 – Y. Miyazaki
	0–7	32:07 – T. Yamada (A. Segawa, M. Tanabu)
	0–8	42:16 – J. Iwaoka (M. Takashima)
N. Derrick (D. Cunningham, V. Ekberg) – 43:11	1–8
	1–9	44:21 – I. Ono (A. Segawa)
	1–10	47:36 – J. Iwaoka (I. Ono)
D. Cunningham (N. Derrick, R. Jones) – 49:28	2–10
	2–11	49:35 – I. Ono (A. Segawa, T. Yamada)
	2–12	50:29 – T. Yamada (A. Segawa)
	2–13	53:21 – J. Iwaoka

19 min
Penalties
6 min
12
Shots
46

February 25, 1960	Australia	2–19 (6–1, 5–1, 8–0)	Finland

Robert Reid
Noel McLoughlin
Goalies
Juhani Lahtinen
Referees:
Marshall Ryman
B. Hayashi

	0–1	00:45 – J. Wahlsten (R. Kilpio)
	0–2	04:29 – J. Wahlsten (J. Salmi)
	0–3	05:13 – R. Kilpio
	0–4	05:18 – H. Pulli
	0–5	07:58 – E. Luostarinen (J. Seistamo)
R. Jones – 11:08	1–5
	1–6	18:35 – H. Pulli
J. Thomas – 20:15	2–6
	2–7	21:27 – V. Numminen
	2–8	23:49 – R. Kilpio (Y. Hakala)
	2–9	28:16 – V. Numminen
	2–10	33:19 – E. Luostarinen (Y. Hakala)
	2–11	34:19 – E. Luostarinen (Y. Hakala)
	2–12	? – J. Seistamo
	2–13	? – J. Salmi (T. Rastio)
	2–14	? – T. Rastio
	2–15	? – J. Seistamo
	2–16	? – V. Numminen
	2–17	? – H. Pulli
	2–18	? – P. Nieminen (J. Seistamo)
	2–19	? – J. Seistamo (H. Pulli, P. Nieminen)

16 min
Penalties
10 min
(unknown)
Shots
(unknown)

February 27, 1960	Japan	11–3 (6–0, 2–1, 3–2)	Australia

Toshiei Honma
Goalies
Robert Reid
Referees:
Buck Riley
Marsh Ryman

T. Kakihara – 00:52	1–0
I. Ono – 01:25	2–0
A. Irie – 02:40	3–0
T. Yamada (A. Irie, A. Segawa) – 08:57	4–0
M. Takashima (A. Segawa) – 12:31	5–0
A. Segawa – 15:00	6–0
A Irie (T. Yamada) – 26:32	7–0
	7–1	28:07 – N. Derrick
M. Murano (S. Honma) – 32:50	8–1
H. Inatsu – 42:09	9–1
	9–2	47:24 – B. Hansen (R. Jones)
	9–3	51:13 – D. Cunningham
I. Ono (M. Murano) – 53:45	10–3
I. Ono – 54:16	11–3

2 min
Penalties
10 min
57
Shots
36

== Nordic combined ==
Athlete	Event	Ski jumping		Cross-country			Total	
Athlete	Event	Points	Rank	Time	Rank	Points	Points	Rank
Hal Nerdal	Individual	138.0	33	1:10:15.6	194.387	30	332.387	31

== Speed skating ==
Athlete	Event	Final	
Athlete	Event	Time	Rank
Colin Hickey	500 m	41.3	13
Colin Hickey	1500 m	2:16.1	14
Roy Tutty	500 m	43.5	35
Roy Tutty	1500 m	2:23.8	37

== See also ==
- Australia at the Winter Olympics
