= Ice hockey at the 1960 Winter Olympics =

Tournament details
- Host country: United States
- Dates: 19–28 February 1960
- Teams: 9

Final positions
- Champions: United States (1st title)
- Runners-up: Canada
- Third place: Soviet Union
- Fourth place: Czechoslovakia

Tournament statistics
- Games played: 30
- Goals scored: 334 (11.13 per game)
- Scoring leader: (Canada) Fred Etcher (21 points)

The men's ice hockey tournament at the 1960 Winter Olympics in Squaw Valley, California, was the ninth Olympic Championship, also serving as the 27th World Championships and the 38th European Championships. The United States won its first Olympic gold medal and second World Championship. Canada, represented for the second time by the Kitchener-Waterloo Dutchmen, won the silver and Canada's ninth consecutive Olympic ice hockey medal (a feat not matched until the Soviet Union won its ninth consecutive medal in 1988). The Soviet Union (the highest finishing European team) won the bronze medal and its sixth European Championship. The tournament was held at the Blyth Arena, under the supervision of George Dudley on behalf of the International Ice Hockey Federation.

Canada, the Soviet Union, Czechoslovakia and Sweden were the top four teams heading into the Games. All four were defeated by the American team, which won all seven games it played. On the 50th anniversary of these Games, a documentary entitled Forgotten Miracle was produced by Northland Films, making reference to the more famous 1980 gold medal known as the Miracle on Ice; these were the only two Olympic gold medals won by USA men's ice hockey before 2026. Herb Brooks, the coach of the 1980 US team, was the last player cut from the 1960 team by coach Jack Riley.

This was the first and to date, only time Australia participated in an Olympic men's ice hockey tournament.

== Medalists ==
Gold	Silver	Bronze
United States Jack McCartan; John Mayasich; John Kirrane; Paul Johnson; Weldon Olson; Eugene Grazia; Richard Rodenhiser; Edwyn Owen; Rodney Paavola; Richard Meredith; William Christian; Tom Williams; Roger Christian; Robert McVey; Lawrence Palmer; Bill Cleary; Bob Cleary	Canada Harold Hurley; Harry Sinden; Jack Douglas; Bob Attersley; Fred Etcher; George Samolenko; Donald Charles Head; Darryl Sly; Ken Laufman; Floyd Martin; James Connelly; Robert Forhan; Donald Rope; Maurice Benoît; Bobby Rousseau; Cliff Pennington; Robert McKnight	Soviet Union Yuri Tsitsinov; Vladimir Grebennikov; Mikhail Bychkov; Viktor Pryazhnikov; Nikolai Karpov; Nikolai Puchkov; Yevgeni Groshev; Viktor Yakushev; Stanislav Petukhov; Yevgeny Yorkin; Nikolai Sologubov; Yuri Baulin; Aleksandr Almetov; Konstantin Loktev; Veniamin Alexandrov; Genrikh Sidorenkov; Alfred Kuchevsky

== Qualification ==
The two German teams played a qualification round to determine which team would participate at the Olympics. West Germany won both games.

December 9, 1959	West Germany	5–2 (2–1, 1–1, 2–0)	East Germany	Garmisch-Partenkirchen, West Germany

Game reference

December 12, 1959	East Germany	3–5 (1–2, 2–0, 0–3)	West Germany	Weißwasser, East Germany

Game reference

== First round ==
Top two teams (shaded ones) from each group advanced to the final round and played for 1st-6th places, other teams played in the consolation round.

=== Group A ===
Pos	Team	Pld	W	L	D	GF	GA	GD	Pts
1	Canada	2	2	0	0	24	3	+21	4
2	Sweden	2	1	1	0	21	5	+16	2
3	Japan	2	0	2	0	1	38	−37	0

Source: HockeyCanada.ca

February 19, 1960	Canada	5–2 (2–1, 1–1, 2–0)	Sweden

Game reference

Harold Hurley
Goalies
Bengt Lindquist
Kjell Svensson
Referees:
Robert Barry
Bill Riley

F. Martin (C. Pennington) – 08:26	1–0
	1–1	11:43 – C. Öberg (E. Granath)
B. Attersley (F. Etcher, J. Douglas) – 17:03	2–1
G. Samolenko (M. Benoît, B. Attersley) – 31:00	3–1
	3–2	31:47 – L. Lundvall (Nisse Nilsson)
F. Etcher (B. Attersley) – 51:37	4–2
F. Etcher (G. Samolenko, B. Attersley) – 56:06	5–2

29 min
Penalties
18 min
47
Shots
25

February 20, 1960	Canada	19–1 (5–0, 7–1, 7–0)	Japan

Don Head
Goalies
Toshiei Honma
Shoichi Tomita
Referees:
Kurt Hauser
Richard Wagner

B. Attersley (F. Etcher) – 04:52	1–0
B. Rousseau – 07:28	2–0
F. Etcher (B. Attersley) – 10:31	3–0
H. Sinden (F. Etcher) – 11:24	4–0
G. Samolenko (B. Attersley) – 11:51	5–0
B. Attersley (F. Etcher) – 22:00	6–0
H. Sinden (B. Forhan, D. Rope) – 24:15	7–0
B. Rousseau (H. Sinden) – 25:54	8–0
	8–1	28:28 – A. Irie (A. Segawa)
G. Samolenko (F. Etcher, H. Sinden) – 31:15	9–1
F. Martin (J. Connelly, B. McKnight) – 34:13	10–1
J. Connelly (F. Martin, B. McKnight) – 36:20	11–1
B. Rousseau (B. Forhan) – 39:26	12–1
F. Etcher (B. Attersley) – 43:37	13–1
F. Etcher – 44:59	14–1
Rope – 46:00	15–1
F. Martin (M. Benoît) – 48:35	16–1
B. McKnight (F. Martin) – 48:51	17–1
G. Samolenko (J. Douglas) – 51:45	18–1
B. Rousseau (B. Forhan, D. Rope) – 52:24	19–1

2 min
Penalties
6 min
95
Shots
15

February 21, 1960	Sweden	19–0 (8–0, 5–0, 6–0)	Japan

Kjell Svensson
Goalies
Toshiei Honma
Shoichi Tomita
Referees:
Everett Riley
Marshall Ryman

R. Pettersson (N. Nilsson) – 01:00	1–0
R. Pettersson (N. Nilsson) – 03:51	2–0
C. Öberg (A. Andersson) – 07:15	3–0
C. Öberg (A. Andersson) – 07:23	4–0
A. Andersson (C. Öberg) – 07:51	5–0
G. Blomé (R. Pettersson) – 13:57	6–0
G. Blomé (C. Öberg) – 15:33	7–0
E. Granath (G. Blomé) – 18:05	8–0
A. Andersson (E. Granath) – 26:48	9–0
L. Lundvall (R. Pettersson) – 29:07	10–0
S. Johansson – 30:00	11–0
S. Johansson (S. Bröms) – 30:33	12–0
G. Blomé (L. Lundvall) – 33:28	13–0
N. Nilsson – 41:09	14–0
S. Johansson – 41:29	15–0
R. Pettersson – 47:56	16–0
C. Öberg – 56:14	17–0
N. Nilsson (R. Pettersson) – 56:49	18–0
H. Svedberg (R. Pettersson) – 57:17	19–0

6 min
Penalties
18 min
68
Shots
16

=== Group B ===
Pos	Team	Pld	W	L	D	GF	GA	GD	Pts
1	Soviet Union	2	2	0	0	16	4	+12	4
2	Germany	2	1	1	0	4	9	−5	2
3	Finland	2	0	2	0	5	12	−7	0

Source: HockeyCanada.ca

February 19, 1960	Soviet Union	8–0 (3–0, 3–0, 2–0)	Germany

Game reference

Yevgeny Yorkin
Goalies
Michael Hobelsberger
Referees:
Marsh Ryman
Everett Riley

Y. Baulin (V. Alexandrov) – 01:32	1–0
V. Pryazhnikov (S. Petukhov) – 04:01	2–0
V. Alexandrov – 18:44	3–0
S. Petukhov (N. Sologubov) – 22:55	4–0
E. Groshev (V. Yakushev) – 31:53	5–0
A. Almetov (V. Alexandrov) – 38:16	6–0
N. Sologubov (Y. Tsitsinov) – 45:19	7–0
K. Loktev (V. Alekandrov, A. Kuchevsky) – 49:06	8–0

16 min
Penalties
20 min
32
Shots
18

February 20, 1960	Soviet Union	8–4 (2–1, 4–0, 2–3)	Finland

Nikolai Puchkov
Yevgeny Yorkin
Goalies
Esko Niemi
Referees:
Bill McKenzie
Hugh McLean

V. Grebennikov (S. Petukhov, Y. Tsitsinov) – 04:43	1–0
E. Groshev (V. Yakushev, N. Karpov) – 09:35	2–0
	2–1	18:09 – M. Lampainen
N. Karpov – 22:36	3–1
V. Yakushev (S. Petukhov) – 29:36	4–1
Y. Tsitsinov (V. Grebennikov, N. Karpov) – 36:21	5–1
E. Groshev (S. Petukhov) – 37:30	6–1
	6–2	43:20 – H. Pulli
K. Loktev (V. Alexandrov) – 44:31	7–2
	7–3	47:15 – P. Nieminen (H. Pulli)
V. Grebennikov (Y. Tsitsinov) – 56:28	8–3
	8–4	59:42 – P. Nieminen

26 min
Penalties
8 min
41
Shots
36

February 21, 1960	Germany	4–1 (1–0, 2–0, 1–1)	Finland

Michael Hobelsberger
Goalies
Juhani Lahtinen
Referees:
Bob Barry
Bill Riley

K. Sepp (E. Trautwein) – 16:16	1–0
K. Sepp (E. Trautwein, X. Unsinn) – 21:03	2–0
J. Reif (G. Eberl) – 32:16	3–0
	3–1	47:27 – T. Rastio (J. Wahlsten)
H. Rampf (M. Egen) – 54:56	4–1

6 min
Penalties
8 min
41
Shots
38

=== Group C ===
Pos	Team	Pld	W	L	D	GF	GA	GD	Pts
1	United States	2	2	0	0	19	6	+13	4
2	Czechoslovakia	2	1	1	0	23	8	+15	2
3	Australia	2	0	2	0	2	30	−28	0

Source: HockeyCanada.ca

February 19, 1960	United States	7–5 (2–1, 1–3, 4–1)	Czechoslovakia

Game reference

Jack McCartan
Goalies
Vladimír Nadrchal
Referees:
Hugh McLean
Bill McKenzie

J. Mayasich – 05:50	1–0
	1–1	07:04 – J. Cerny (J. Volf)
J. Mayasich – 16:56	2–1
	2–2	23:37 – V. Bubnik
T. Williams (R. McVey, B. Christian) – 28:54	3–2
	3–3	29:57 – M. Vlach (V. Pantucek, V. Bubnik)
	3–4	13:37 – V. Pantucek
P. Johnson (J. Mayasich, R. McVey) – 41:58	4–4
J. Mayasich – 44:29	5–4
T. Williams (B. Christian) – 47:12	6–4
B. Cleary – 53:54	7–4
	7–5	58:32 – J. Golonka (J. Starsi, K. Gut)

8 min
Penalties
8 min
34
Shots
35

February 20, 1960	Czechoslovakia	18–1 (7–1, 3–0, 8–0)	Australia

Vladimír Nadrchal
Vladimír Dvořáček
Goalies
Robert Reid
Referees:
Bob Barry
Bill Riley

J. Golonka (J. Starsi) – 02:35	1–0
J. Volf – 03:29	2–0
	2–1	05:17 – D. Cunningham (R. Jones, V. Ekberg)
R. Potsch (J. Golonka) – 06:31	3–1
J. Golonka (J. Cerny) – 08:30	4–1
J. Cerny (J. Volf) – 09:30	5–1
J. Starsi (M. Vlach) – 14:30	6–1
J. Cerny (J. Volf) – 15:56	7–1
V. Pantucek (V. Bubnik) – 20:32	8–1
R. Potsch (V. Pantucek) – 22:07	9–1
J. Starsi (K. Gut) – 33:24	10–1
J. Starsi (M. Vlach) – 41:57	11–1
K. Gut (V. Pantucek) – 45:02	12–1
M. Vlach – 45:49	13–1
M. Vlach – 46:42	14–1
V. Bubnik (V. Pantucek) – 49:09	15–1
J. Golonka (M. Vlach, F. Tikal) – 49:45	16–1
M. Vlach (J. Golonka, Jan Kasper) – 53:44	17–1
J. Golonka (R. Potsch) – 54:24	18–1

6 min
Penalties
2 min
82
Shots
15

February 21, 1960	United States	12–1 (6–0, 3–0, 3–1)	Australia

Jack McCartan
Goalies
Robert Reid
Noel McLoughlin
Referees:
Bill McKenzie
Hugh McLean

W. Olson (P. Johnson, R. Meridith) – 01:09	1–0
R. Rodenhiser (Bob Cleary) – 05:13	2–0
T. Williams – 09:37	3–0
Bob Cleary (Bill Cleary) – 14:07	4–0
R. Meridith (E. Owen) – 16:31	5–0
J. Mayasich – 17:36	6–0
J. Mayasich (T. Williams, R. Christian) – 22:39	7–0
J. Kirrane (E. Owen, R. Paavola) – 29:39	8–0
R. Christian (T. Williams) – 31:23	9–0
	9–1	41:02 – R. Jones (D. Cunningham)
R. Meredith – 42:21	10–1
P. Johnson (J. Mayasich, B. Christian) – 44:10	11–1
E. Owen (B. Christian) – 47:40	12–1

0 min
Penalties
4 min
47
Shots
10

== Consolation round ==
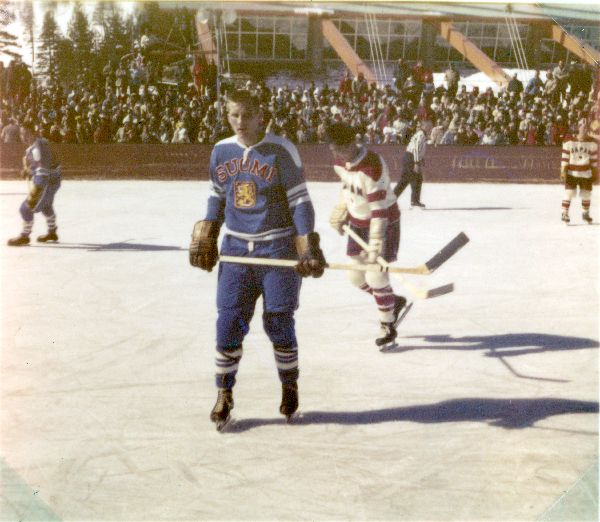
The game between Finland and Japan. It finished tied at 6–6.

Teams that did not qualify for the final round played here. Sources differ on which Finland-Japan game took place on the 23rd, and which game took place on the 26th.

Pos	Team	Pld	W	L	D	GF	GA	GD	Pts
1	Finland	4	3	0	1	50	11	+39	7
2	Japan	4	2	1	1	32	22	+10	5
3	Australia	4	0	4	0	8	57	−49	0

Source: HockeyCanada.ca

February 22, 1960	Australia	1–14 (1–8, 0–4, 0–2)	Finland

Robert Reid
Noel McLoughlin
Goalies
Juhani Lahtinen
Referees:
Buck Riley
Hiroshi Hayrachi

	0–1	03:25 – J. Seistamo
	0–2	05:19 – R. Kilpiö
	0–3	06:21 – P. Nieminen
	0–4	07:51 – E. Luostarinen (J. Seistamo)
	0–5	09:22 – R. Kilpiö (J. Wahlsten)
	0–6	15:54 – V. Soini (E. Luostarinen)
	0–7	16:04 – R. Kilpiö (K. Rassa)
	0–8	18:07 – P. Nieminen
D. Cunningham – 18:48	1–8
	1–9	23:24 – K. Numminen
	1–10	36:54 – J. Wahlsten
	1–11	37:51 – J. Wahlsten
	1–12	39:19 – E. Luostarinen
	1–13	43:59 – J. Seistamo
	1–14	36:40 – R. Kilpiö

6 min
Penalties
6 min
8
Shots
46

February 23, 1960	Finland	6–6 (2–1, 3–2, 1–3)	Japan

game summary not contained in official IOC report

February 24, 1960	Australia	2–13 (0–3, 0–4, 2–6)	Japan

Noel McLoughlin
Goalies
Toshiei Honma
Referees:
Buck Riley
Marshall Ryman

	0–1	14:37 – T. Yamada
	0–2	15:21 – H. Inatsu (I. Ono)
	0–3	16:14 – T. Kakihara (M. Takashima, Y. Miyazaki)
	0–4	22:30 – M. Takashima
	0–5	27:27 – Y. Miyazaki
	0–6	31:17 – Y. Miyazaki
	0–7	32:07 – T. Yamada (A. Segawa, M. Tanabu)
	0–8	42:16 – J. Iwaoka (M. Takashima)
N. Derrick (D. Cunningham, V. Ekberg) – 43:11	1–8
	1–9	44:21 – I. Ono (A. Segawa)
	1–10	47:36 – J. Iwaoka (I. Ono)
D. Cunningham (N. Derrick, R. Jones) – 49:28	2–10
	2–11	49:35 – I. Ono (A. Segawa, T. Yamada)
	2–12	50:29 – T. Yamada (A. Segawa)
	2–13	53:21 – J. Iwaoka

19 min
Penalties
6 min
12
Shots
46

February 25, 1960	Australia	2–19 (6–1, 5–1, 8–0)	Finland

Robert Reid
Noel McLoughlin
Goalies
Juhani Lahtinen
Referees:
Marshall Ryman
B. Hayashi

	0–1	00:45 – J. Wahlsten (R. Kilpiö)
	0–2	04:29 – J. Wahlsten (J. Salmi)
	0–3	05:13 – R. Kilpiö
	0–4	05:18 – H. Pulli
	0–5	07:58 – E. Luostarinen (J. Seistamo)
R. Jones – 11:08	1–5
	1–6	18:35 – H. Pulli
J. Thomas – 20:15	2–6
	2–7	21:27 – K. Numminen
	2–8	23:49 – R. Kilpiö (Y. Hakala)
	2–9	28:16 – K. Numminen
	2–10	33:19 – E. Luostarinen (Y. Hakala)
	2–11	34:19 – E. Luostarinen (Y. Hakala)
	2–12	? – J. Seistamo
	2–13	? – J. Salmi (T. Rastio)
	2–14	? – T. Rastio
	2–15	? – J. Seistamo
	2–16	? – K. Numminen
	2–17	? – H. Pulli
	2–18	? – P. Nieminen (J. Seistamo)
	2–19	? – J. Seistamo (H. Pulli, P. Nieminen)

16 min
Penalties
10 min
(unknown)
Shots
(unknown)

February 26, 1960	Finland	11–2 (2–1, 6–0, 3–1)	Japan

Game reference

Esko Niemi
Goalies
Toshiei Honma
Referees:
Robert Barry
Bill Riley

H. Pulli (J. Seistamo) – 06:55	1–0
T. Rastio (R. Kilpiö) – 07:53	2–0
	2–1	11:40 – A. Segawa (A. Irie)
R. Kilpiö – 24:58	3–1
J. Seistamo (P. Nieminen) – 26:54	4–1
P. Nieminen (H. Pulli) – 28:41	5–1
J. Seistamo – 33:43	6–1
H. Pulli (T. Rastio) – 36:52	7–1
T. Rastio (H. Pulli) – 37:10	8–1
R. Kilpiö (E. Koiso) – 51:48	9–1
	9–2	52:58 – T. Yamada (A. Irie)
P. Nieminen (E. Koiso) – 35:59	10–2
E. Luostarinen (K. Numminen) – 59:19	11–2

game called with one second to play; both benches emptied.
14 min
Penalties
26 min
55
Shots
19

February 27, 1960	Japan	11–3 (6–0, 2–1, 3–2)	Australia

Toshiei Honma
Goalies
Robert Reid
Referees:
Buck Riley
Marsh Ryman

T. Kakihara – 00:52	1–0
I. Ono – 01:25	2–0
A. Irie – 02:40	3–0
T. Yamada (A. Irie, A. Segawa) – 08:57	4–0
M. Takashima (A. Segawa) – 12:31	5–0
A. Segawa – 15:00	6–0
A Irie (T. Yamada) – 26:32	7–0
	7–1	28:07 – N. Derrick
M. Murano (S. Honma) – 32:50	8–1
H. Inatsu – 42:09	9–1
	9–2	47:24 – B. Hansen (R. Jones)
	9–3	51:13 – D. Cunningham
I. Ono (M. Murano) – 53:45	10–3
I. Ono – 54:16	11–3

2 min
Penalties
10 min
57
Shots
36

== Final round ==
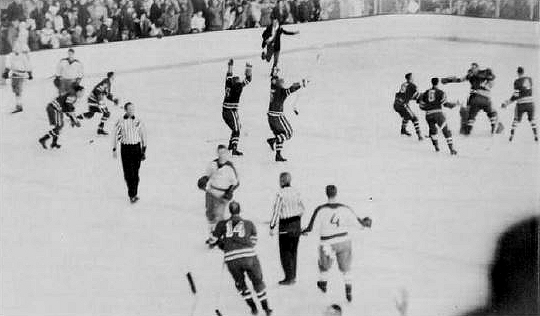
Match between the United States and the Soviet Union in the final round. The United States won the game, 3–2.

First place team wins gold, second silver and third bronze.

Pos	Team	Pld	W	L	D	GF	GA	GD	Pts
1	United States	5	5	0	0	29	11	+18	10
2	Canada	5	4	1	0	31	12	+19	8
3	Soviet Union	5	2	2	1	24	19	+5	5
4	Czechoslovakia	5	2	3	0	21	23	−2	4
5	Sweden	5	1	3	1	19	19	0	3
6	Germany	5	0	5	0	5	45	−40	0

Source: HockeyCanada.ca

February 22, 1960	Soviet Union	8–5 (3–2, 2–1, 3–2)	Czechoslovakia

Game reference

Nikolai Puchkov
Goalies
Vladimír Nadrchal
Vladimír Dvořáček

Y. Tsitsinov (M. Bychkov, N. Sologubov) – 07:33	1–0
	1–1	14:17 – V. Bubnik
K. Loktev (A. Almetov, V. Aleksandrov) – 15:56	2–1
V. Aleksandrov – 18:26	3–1
	3–2	19:44 – J. Cerny
Y. Tsitsinov (V. Grebennikov) – 25:38	4–2
K. Loktev (A. Almetov, N. Sologubov) – 30:31	5–2
	5–3	35:01 – V. Pantucek (R. Potsch, V. Bubnik)
V. Aledsandrov (A. Almetov, K. Loktev) – 41:08	6–3
S. Petukhov (V. Yakushev) – 44:28	7–3
	7–4	45:03 – V. Pantucek (V. Bubnik, B. Danda)
	7–5	50:13 – V. Pantucek (B. Danda)
K. Loktev (V. Grebennikov, E. Groshev) – 53:09	8–5

14 min
Penalties
8 min
43
Shots
37

February 22, 1960	United States	6–3 (4–0, 1–2, 1–1)	Sweden

Jack McCartan
Goalies
Kjell Svensson
Referees:
Richard Wagner
Kurt Hauser

R. Christian (B. Christian) – 03:26	1–0
R. McVey (W. Cleary) – 10:19	2–0
R. Cleary (R. McVey, W. Cleary) – 15:52	3–0
P. Johnson – 17:21	4–0
	4–1	20:14 – R. Pettersson (R. Stoltz)
	4–2	22:32 – N. Nilsson
R. Christian (T. Williams, B. Christian) – 37:41	5–2
	5–3	43:49 – A. Andersson (C. Öberg)
R. Christian (T. Williams, B. Christian) – 53:30	6–3

4 min
Penalties
0 min
37
Shots
39

February 22, 1960	Canada	12–0 (6–0, 1–0, 5–0)	Germany

Don Head
Goalies
Michael Hobelsberger
Referees:
Bill Riley
Bob Barry

F. Etcher (B. Attersley, G. Samolenko) – 06:58	1–0
F. Etcher (G. Samolenko) – 07:10	2–0
J. Douglas (F. Martin) – 08:04	3–0
B. McKnight (F. Martin) – 08:41	4–0
D. Rope (B. Forhan) – 11:03	5–0
B. Attersley (F. Etcher) – 18:50	6–0
J. Douglas (B. Forhan) – 26:15	7–0
D. Rope (B. Rousseau) – 43:40	8–0
B. Attersley (F. Etcher, G. Samolenko) – 46:01	9–0
G. Samolenko (F. Etcher) – 51:33	10–0
J. Douglas (H. Sinden, B. Attersley) – 52:17	11–0
B. Forhan (B. Rousseau) – 55:59	12–0

4 min
Penalties
4 min
56
Shots
18

February 24, 1960	United States	9–1 (2–0, 3–1, 4–0)	Germany

Jack McCartan
Goalies
Michael Hobelsberger
Referees:
Bill McClean
Bill McKenzie

W. Cleary (R. McVey) – 12:37	1–0
R. Cleary (W. Cleary) – 13:29	2–0
T. Williams (B. Christian), J. Kirrane – 20:55	3–0
W. Cleary – 22:57	4–0
	4–1	25:42 – K. Sepp (X. Unsinn)
W. Cleary – 29:52	5–1
P. Johnson (J. Kirrane) – 45:09	6–1
J. Mayasich (P. Johnson, R. Meridith) – 46:02	7–1
W. Cleary – 57:58	8–1
J. Mayasich (W. Cleary, R. Cleary) – 58:49	9–1

14 min
Penalties
12 min
47
Shots
26

February 24, 1960	Soviet Union	2–2 (0–0, 0–0, 2–2)	Sweden

Nikolai Puchkov
Goalies
Kjell Svensson
Referees:
Bill Riley
Bob Barry

	0–1	42:39 – N. Nilsson (L. Lundvall)
K. Loktev (E. Groshev, N. Sologubov) – 48:07	1–1
V. Aleksandrov (N. Sologubov) – 51:49	2–1
	2–2	58:32 – N. Nilsson (L. Lundvall, R. Pettersson)

4 min
Penalties
4 min
34
Shots
28

February 24, 1960	Canada	4–0 (3–0, 1–0, 0–0)	Czechoslovakia

Don Head
Goalies
Vladimír Nadrchal
Referees:
Kurt Hauser
Richard Wagner

D. Sly (J. Connelly) – 06:41	1–0
F. Martin (C. Pennington, H. Sinden) – 16:45	2–0
G. Samolenko (F. Etcher, M. Benoît) – 18:22	3–0
F. Martin (D. Sly) – 31:36	4–0

10 min
Penalties
4 min
40
Shots
38

February 25, 1960	Soviet Union	7–1 (0–1, 4–0, 3–0)	Germany

Yevgeny Yorkin
Goalies
Michael Hobelsberger
Referees:
Bob Barry
Bill Riley

	0–1	03:17 – H. Huber
V. Grebennikov (Y. Tsitsinov) – 27:47	1–1
Y. Tsitsinov (Y. Baulin) – 31:33	2–1
V. Alexandrov (A. Kuchevsky, V. Yakushev) – 33:40	3–1
S. Petukhov (A. Kuchevsky) – 34:42	4–1
Y. Tsitsinov (Mikhail Bychkov) – 50:41	5–1
S. Petukhov (G. Sidorenkov) – 53:24	6–1
G. Sidorenkov – 39:16	7–1

6 min
Penalties
10 min
37
Shots
13

February 25, 1960	United States	2–1 (1–0, 1–0, 0–1)	Canada

Jack McCartan
Goalies
Don Head
Referees:
Kurt Hauser
Richard Wagner

R. Cleary (J. Mayasich) – 12:47	1–0
P. Johnson – 34:00	2–0
	2–1	53:38 – J. Connelly (F. Martin, K. Laufman)

4 min
Penalties
6 min
27
Shots
40

February 25, 1960	Czechoslovakia	3–1 (3–0, 0–1, 0–0)	Sweden

Vladimír Nadrchal
Goalies
Kjell Svensson
Referees:
Bill McKenzie
Hugh McLean

V. Pantucek (J. Kasper, R. Potsch) – 12:17	1–0
J. Kasper – 18:02	2–0
V. Pantucek – 18:35	3–0
	3–1	33:19 – N. Nilsson (R. Pettersson, L. Lundvall)

8 min
Penalties
10 min
21
Shots
31

February 27, 1960	Czechoslovakia	9–1 (3–1, 4–0, 2–0)	Germany

Vladimír Nadrchal
Goalies
Uli Jansen
Referees:
Hugh McLean
Bill McKenzie

	0–1	04:26 – H. Schuldes (G. Eberl)
F. Tikal (F. Vanek, J. Jirik) – 12:41	1–1
M. Vlach (J. Starsi, K. Gut) – 14:46	2–1
V. Bubnik (K. Gut, V. Pantucek) – 17:17	3–1
M. Vlach (J. Starsi) – 30:59	4–1
R. Potsch (F. Vanek, J. Jirik) – 33:20	5–1
J. Starsi (J. Golonka) – 36:54	6–1
J. Jirik (F. Vanek) – 39:30	7–1
F. Vanek (J. Jirik) – 54:44	8–1
F. Vanek (J. Cerny) – 55:22	9–1

10 min
Penalties
14 min
36
Shots
17

February 27, 1960	United States	3–2 (1–2, 1–0, 1–0)	Soviet Union

Jack McCartan
Goalies
Nikolai Puchkov
Referees:
Kurt Hauser
Richard Wagner

W. Cleary (R. Cleary) – 04:04	1–0
	1–1	05:03 – V. Alexandrov (N. Sologubov)
	1–2	09:37 – M. Bychkov (V. Grebennikov)
W. Christian (R. Christian) – 31:01	2–2
W. Christian (T. Williams, R. Christian) – 54:59	3–2

4 min
Penalties
6 min
34
Shots
29

February 27, 1960	Canada	6–5 (1–4, 1–0, 4–1)	Sweden

Don Head
Goalies
Kjell Svensson
Bengt Lindquist
Referees:
Bob Barry
Bill Riley

	0–1	01:35 – L. Lundvall (R. Pettersson)
	0–2	04:36 – S. Bröms (U. Sterner)
	0–3	14:55 – S. Johansson (B. Nordlander)
G. Samolenko (F. Etcher) – 15:23	1–3
	1–4	18:22 – L. Lundvall (R. Pettersson, B. Nordlander)
J. Connelly (F. Martin) – 36:41	2–4
B. Rousseau (D. Rope) – 43:11	3–4
H. Sinden (K. Laufman) – 51:17	4–4
	4–5	52:55 – L. Lundvall (H. Svedberg)
M. Benoît (B. Rousseau) – 55:32	5–5
J. Connelly (K. Laufman) – 57:31	6–5

18 min
Penalties
6 min
45
Shots
38

February 28, 1960	United States	9–4 (3–3, 0–1, 6–0)	Czechoslovakia

Jack McCartan
Lawrence Palmer
Goalies
Vladimír Nadrchal
Referees:
Hugh McLean
Bill McKenzie

	0–1	00:08 – M. Vlach (F. Tikal, J. Golonka)
W. Olson (P. Johnson, R. Rodenhiser) – 04:19	1–1
R. McVey (R. Cleary) – 09:32	2–1
	2–2	11:20 – V. Bubnik (K. Gut)
R. Christian (W. Christian, T. Williams) – 13:33	3–2
	3–3	14:40 – F. Vanek (K. Gut, J. Cerny)
	3–4	26:58 – M. Vlach (J. Kasper)
R. Christian (W. Christian) – 45:59	4–4
R. Cleary (J. Mayasich) – 47:40	5–4
R. Cleary (W. Cleary, J. Kirrane) – 51:36	6–4
R. Christian (J. Mayasich, W. Cleary) – 52:05	7–4
W. Cleary – 52:43	8–4
R. Christian (W. Christian) – 57:56	9–4

18 min
Penalties
8 min
54
Shots
30

February 28, 1960	Sweden	8–2 (2–0, 2–2, 4–0)	Germany

Bengt Lindqvist
Goalies
Michael Hobelsberger
Referees:
Bill Riley
Bob Barry

L. Lundvall (N. Nilsson) – 01:15	1–0
G. Blomé (A. Andersson) – 03:18	2–0
H. Svedberg (S. Johansson) – 30:50	3–0
	3–1	31:16 – G. Eberl (H. Schuldes)
	3–2	39:34 – M. Egen
N. Nilsson (A. Andersson) – 39:57	4–2
S. Johansson (R. Stoltz) – 47:33	5–2
S. Johansson (C. Öberg) – 52:56	6–2
L. Lundvall (N. Nilsson) – 55:46	7–2
L. Lundvall (H. Svedberg) – 58:56	8–2

4 min
Penalties
10 min
35
Shots
29

February 28, 1960	Canada	8–5 (3–0, 1–3, 4–2)	Soviet Union

Harold Hurley
Don Head
Goalies
Nikolai Puchkov
Referees:
Kurt Hauser
Richard Wagner

F. Etcher (B. Attersley) – 07:32	1–0
H. Sinden (B. Attersley, F. Etcher) – 18:12	2–0
G. Samolenko (B. Attersley, H. Sinden) – 18:27	3–0
D. Rope (B. Rousseau) – 22:37	4–0
	4–1	25:28 – A. Almetov (V. Aleksandrov)
	4–2	25:51 – V. Aleksandrov (N. Sologubov, K. Loktev)
	4–3	29:56 – V. Grebennikov (M. Bychkov, N. Sologubov)
F. Etcher (B. Attersley) – 45:33	5–3
J. Connelly – 46:48	6–3
F. Martin (J. Connelly, K. Laufman) – 47:53	7–3
	7–4	50:16 – E. Groshev (G. Sidorenkov)
	7–5	55:02 – V. Pryazhnikov (E. Groshev, Y. Baulin)
B. Attersley (F. Etcher) – 59:52	8–5

12 min
Penalties
6 min
44
Shots
33

== Statistics ==
=== Average age ===
Team Australia was the oldest team in the tournament, averaging 28 years and 5 months. Team Finland was the youngest team in the tournament, averaging 23 years and 11 months. Gold medalists Team USA averaged 24 years and 6 months. Tournament average was 25 years and 7 months.

=== Leading scorers ===
Statistics:

Rk	Team	GP	G	A	Pts
1	(Canada) Fred Etcher	7	9	12	21
2	(Canada) Bob Attersley	7	6	12	18
3	(United States) Bill Cleary	7	7	7	14
4	(Soviet Union) Veniamin Aleksandrov	7	7	6	13
5	(United States) Bill Christian	7	2	11	13
6	(Finland) Raimo Kilpiö	6	9	3	12
7	(Finland) Jouni Seistamo	5	8	4	12
T8	(Canada) George Samolenko	7	8	4	12
T8	(Sweden) Lars-Eric Lundvall	7	8	4	12
T10	(Czechoslovakia) Václav Pantůček	7	7	5	12
T10	(United States) John Mayasich	7	7	5	12
T10	(Sweden) Nisse Nilsson	7	7	5	12

=== Tournament awards ===
- Best players selected by the directorate:
  - Best Goaltender: (United States) Jack McCartan
  - Best Defenceman: (Soviet Union) Nikolai Sologubov
  - Best Forward: (Sweden) Nisse Nilsson

== Final ranking ==
1. United States
2. Canada
3. Soviet Union
4. Czechoslovakia
5. Sweden
6. Germany
7. Finland
8. Japan
9. Australia

1960 Men's Olympic champions

United States
1st title

== European Championship final ranking ==
1. Soviet Union
2. Czechoslovakia
3. Sweden
4. Germany
5. Finland
