= List of Olympic men's ice hockey players for Japan =

The list of Olympic men's ice hockey players for Japan consisted of 90 skaters and 9 goaltenders. Men's ice hockey tournaments have been staged at the Olympic Games since 1920 (it was introduced at the 1920 Summer Olympics, and was permanently added to the Winter Olympic Games in 1924). Japan has participated in eight tournaments, the first in 1936 and the most recent in 1998. Japan's best finish is eighth overall, at the 1960 Winter Olympics, while their lowest finish was thirteenth place in 1998.

Koji Iwamoto has scored the most points, 20, and points, 16, while Masahiro Sato has the most goals, with 13; Koji Iwamoto and Akiyoshi Segawa are tied for the most assists, with 8 each. Eleven players have appeared in three Olympics, the most by a Japanese player; one of them, Mamoru Takashima, played in 19 games, the most of any player.

One player, Shoichi Tomita, has been inducted into the International Ice Hockey Federation Hall of Fame, though as a builder and not for his playing career.

== Key ==
General terms
Term	Definition
GP	Games played
IIHFHOF	International Ice Hockey Federation Hall of Fame
Olympics	Number of Olympic Games tournaments
Ref(s)	Reference(s)

Goaltender statistical abbreviations
Abbreviation	Definition
W	Wins
L	Losses
T	Ties
Min	Minutes played
SO	Shutouts
GA	Goals against
GAA	Goals against average

Skater statistical abbreviations
Abbreviation	Definition
G	Goals
A	Assists
P	Points
PIM	Penalty minutes

== Goaltenders ==
Goaltenders
Player	Olympics	Tournament(s)	GP	W	L	T	Min	SO	GA	GAA	Notes	Ref(s)
Teiji Honma	1	1936	2	0	2	0	–	0	–	–		
Toshiei Honma	2	1960, 1964	12	5	5	1	–	–	60	–		
Dusty Imoo	1	1998	3	0	1	2	–	0	10	–		
Takeshi Iwamoto	1	1980	3	0	2	1	–	0	22	–		
Shinichi Iwasaki	1	1998	1	0	1	0	–	0	3	–		
Minoru Misawa	3	1972, 1976, 1980	10	4	6	0	–	–	–	–		
Katsuji Morishima	2	1964, 1968	10	6	4	0	–	–	–	–		
Toshimitsu Otsubo	3	1968, 1972, 1976	11	5	5	0	–	–	–	–		
Shoichi Tomita	1	1960	2	0	2	0	–	0	10	–	IIHFHOF (2006)	

== Skaters ==
Skaters
Player	Olympics	Tournaments	GP	G	A	P	PIM	Notes	Ref(s)
Chikashi Akazawa	1	1960	2	0	0	0	2		
Takeshi Akiba	3	1968, 1972, 1976	15	0	1	1	8		
Nobuhiro Araki	1	1968	5	3	4	7	2		
Isao Asai	1	1968	5	0	0	0	4		
Takeshi Azuma	2	1976, 1980	10	3	2	5	4		
Yutaka Ebina	1	1968	5	3	0	3	6		
Kiyoshi Esashika	1	1976	6	0	1	1	2		
Tadamitsu Fujii	1	1980	5	1	0	1	6		
Kiyoshi Fujita	1	1998	4	1	1	2	2		
Kenichi Furuya	1	1936	2	0	0	0	0		
Tsutomu Hanzawa	3	1972, 1976, 1980	14	3	4	7	0		
Masahiro Hayama	1	1936	2	0	0	0	0		
Takao Hikigi	2	1968, 1972	10	7	5	12	8		
Susumu Hirano	1	1936	2	0	0	0	0		
Sadaki Honma	2	1976, 1980	10	1	2	3	6		
Shinichi Honma	2	1960, 1964	14	3	2	5	12		
Teruyasu Honma	1	1972	3	0	1	1	0		
Hiroshi Hori	3	1972, 1976, 1980	15	0	4	4	8		
Yoshio Hoshino	3	1972, 1976, 1980	15	4	2	6	6		
Mikio Hosoi	1	1980	5	0	0	0	0		
Tatsuo Ichikawa	1	1936	2	0	0	0	0		
Yuji Iga	1	1998	4	0	0	0	2		
Hidenori Inatsu	2	1960, 1964	8	2	0	2	8		
Atsuo Irie	2	1960, 1964	13	4	4	8	6		
Toru Itabashi	1	1968	5	0	0	0	6		
Minoru Ito	3	1968, 1972, 1976	16	10	2	12	6		
Norio Ito	1	1980	5	0	0	0	0		
Koji Iwamoto	3	1964, 1968, 1972	18	12	8	20	8		
Joji Iwaoka	1	1960	4	3	0	3	0		
Matthew Kabayama	1	1998	4	1	0	1	0		
Isao Kakihara	1	1972	5	0	0	0	0		
Takashi Kakihara	1	1960	6	3	1	4	12		
Shinkichi Kamei	1	1936	2	0	0	0	0		
Takaaki Kaneiri	1	1968	5	0	1	1	8		
Hisashi Kasai	1	1968	3	0	0	0	0		
Tatsuki Katayama	1	1998	4	0	0	0	4		
Isao Kawabuchi	1	1964	8	3	0	3	0		
Yutaka Kawaguchi	1	1998	4	0	0	0	0		
Makoto Kawahira	1	1998	4	0	0	0	2		
Katsutoshi Kawamura	1	1980	5	0	0	0	0		
Kimio Kazahari	1	1964	8	0	0	0	0		
Kozue Kinoshita	1	1936	2	0	0	0	0		
Masatatsu Kitazawa	1	1936	2	0	0	0	0		
Takayuki Kobori	1	1998	4	0	0	0	6		
Atsuo Kudo	1	1998	4	0	1	1	4		
Kimihisa Kudo	2	1964, 1968	10	3	2	5	2		
Hideaki Kurokawa	1	1972	5	0	0	0	4		
Ryan Kuwabara	1	1998	4	2	0	2	4		
Yoshiaki Kyoya	2	1976, 1980	10	0	0	0	4		
Kazuo Matsuda	1	1968	5	0	2	2	2		
Mikio Matsuda	1	1980	5	0	1	1	0		
Hiroshi Matsuura	1	1998	4	0	0	0	0		
Hiroyuki Matsuura	1	1964	8	0	0	0	0		
Satoru Misawa	1	1980	5	1	2	3	0		
Hiroyuki Miura	1	1998	4	0	0	0	4		
Takayuki Miura	1	1998	4	0	0	0	2		
Yoshihiro Miyazaki	1	1960	6	2	1	3	10		
Masao Murano	1	1960	4	1	1	2	4		
Hitoshi Nakamura	2	1976, 1980	10	1	0	1	18		
Minoru Nakano	1	1964	7	0	0	0	6		
Iwao Nakayama	3	1972, 1976, 1980	15	0	1	1	4		
Jiro Ogawa	1	1964	7	1	0	1	2		
Toru Okajima	2	1968, 1972	10	7	2	9	6		
Isao Ono	2	1960, 1964	14	9	3	12	10		
Tsutsumi Otomo	1	1998	4	1	1	2	12		
Toshiyuki Sakai	1	1998	4	0	2	2	6		
Hideo Sakurai	2	1976, 1980	10	5	3	8	4		
Kunihiko Sakurai	1	1998	4	0	0	0	4		
Masahiro Sato	1	1964	8	13	1	14	2		
Michihiro Sato	1	1968	5	0	3	3	2		
Akiyoshi Segawa	1	1960	6	2	8	10	2		
Shigeru Shimada	2	1960, 1964	14	0	3	3	2		
Toshihiko Shoji	1	1936	2	0	0	0	0		
Akihito Sugisawa	1	1998	4	2	2	4	4		
Hideo Suzuki	1	1972	2	0	0	0	0		
Kunito Takagi	1	1960	6	0	0	0	4		
Mamoru Takashima	3	1960, 1964, 1968	19	11	3	14	4		
Masami Tanabu	2	1960, 1964	14	1	4	5	16		
Yasushin Tanaka	2	1972, 1976	10	4	4	8	2		
Kenji Toriyabe	1	1968	5	2	1	3	0		
Takashi Tsuburai	1	1972	5	0	1	1	6		
Steve Tsujiura	1	1998	4	0	0	0	6		
Hideo Urabe	2	1976, 1980	11	6	2	8	8		
Herb Wakabayashi	3	1972, 1976, 1980	13	5	4	9	2		
Koji Wakasa	2	1976, 1980	10	0	0	0	14		
Shin Yahata	1	1998	4	1	3	4	4		
Toshihiko Yamada	1	1960	6	5	2	7	2		
Takeshi Yamanaka	1	1998	4	0	2	2	6		
Tomio Yamazaki	1	1972	4	0	2	2	4		
Chris Yule	1	1998	4	0	0	0	2		

== Bibliography ==
- International Ice Hockey Federation, IIHF Hall of Fame, International Ice Hockey Federation
- Podnieks, Andrew (1997), Canada's Olympic Hockey Teams: The Complete History, 1920–1998, Toronto: Doubleday Canada, ISBN 0-385-25688-4
- Podnieks, Andrew, ed. (2010), IIHF Media Guide & Record Book 2011, Toronto: Moydart Press
- Podnieks, Andrew; Szemberg, Szymon (2008), IIHF Top 100 Hockey Stories of All-Time, H. B. Fenn & Company, Ltd., ISBN 978-1-55168-358-4
- Szemberg, Szymon; Podnieks, Andrew, eds. (2007), World of Hockey: Celebrating a Century of the IIHF, Bolton, Ontario: Fenn Publishing, ISBN 978-1-55168-307-2
