= Czechoslovakia at the 1960 Winter Olympics =

- IOC code: TCH (CZE used at these Games)
- NOC: Czechoslovak Olympic Committee

in Squaw Valley
- Competitors: 21 (20 men, 1 woman) in 4 sports
- Flag bearer: Ján Starší (ice hockey)
- Medals Ranked 13th: Gold 0 Silver 1 Bronze 0 Total 1

Winter Olympics appearances (overview)
- 1924; 1928; 1932; 1936; 1948; 1952; 1956; 1960; 1964; 1968; 1972; 1976; 1980; 1984; 1988; 1992

Other related appearances
- Czech Republic (1994–pres.); Slovakia (1994–pres.)

Czechoslovakia competed at the 1960 Winter Olympics in Squaw Valley, United States.

== Medalists ==
Medal	Name	Sport	Event	Date
Silver	Karol Divín	Figure skating	Men's singles	26 February

== Cross-country skiing ==
Men

Event	Athlete	Race	
Event	Athlete	Time	Rank
15 km	Rudolf Čillík	57:23.7	36
30 km	Rudolf Čillík	2'03:50.6	30
50 km	Rudolf Čillík	DNF	–

== Figure skating ==
Men

Athlete	CF	FS	Points	Places	Rank
Karol Divín	1	5	1414.3	22	2nd place, silver medalist(s)

Women

Athlete	CF	FS	Points	Places	Rank
Jana Mrázkova	5	5	1338.7	53	4

== Ice hockey ==
=== Group C ===
Top two teams (shaded ones) from each group advanced to the final round and played for 1st-6th places, other teams played in the consolation round.

Rank	Team	Pld	W	L	T	GF	GA	Pts
1	United States	2	2	0	0	19	6	4
2	Czechoslovakia	2	1	1	0	23	8	2
3	Australia	2	0	2	0	2	30	0

- USA 7-5 Czechoslovakia
- Czechoslovakia 18-1 Australia

=== Final round ===
Rank	Team	Pld	W	L	T	GF	GA	Pts
1	United States	5	5	0	0	29	11	10
2	Canada	5	4	1	0	31	12	8
3	Soviet Union	5	2	2	1	24	19	5
4	Czechoslovakia	5	2	3	0	21	23	4
5	Sweden	5	1	3	1	19	19	3
6	Germany	5	0	5	0	5	45	0

- USSR 8-5 Czechoslovakia
- Canada 4-0 Czechoslovakia
- Czechoslovakia 3-1 Sweden
- Czechoslovakia 9-1 Germany (UTG)
- USA 9-4 Czechoslovakia

=== Leading scorers ===
Rk	Team	GP	G	A	Pts
7th	(Czechoslovakia) Václav Pantůček	7	7	5	12

Contestants; Vlastimil Bubník; Josef Černý; Bronislav Danda; Vladimír Dvořáček; Jozef Golonka; Karel Gut; Jaroslav Jiřík; Jan Kasper; František Mašlán; Vladimír Nadrchal; Václav Pantůček; Rudolf Potsch; Jáno Starší; František Tikal; František Vaněk; Miroslav Vlach; Jaroslav Volf

== Nordic combined ==
Events:

- normal hill ski jumping (Three jumps, best two counted and shown here.)
- 15 km cross-country skiing

Athlete	Event	Ski Jumping				Cross-country			Total	
Athlete	Event	Distance 1	Distance 2	Points	Rank	Time	Points	Rank	Points	Rank
Vlastimil Melich	Individual	60.5	61.5	198.0	23	1'01:49.0	227.097	13	425.097	18
