= Toshiei =

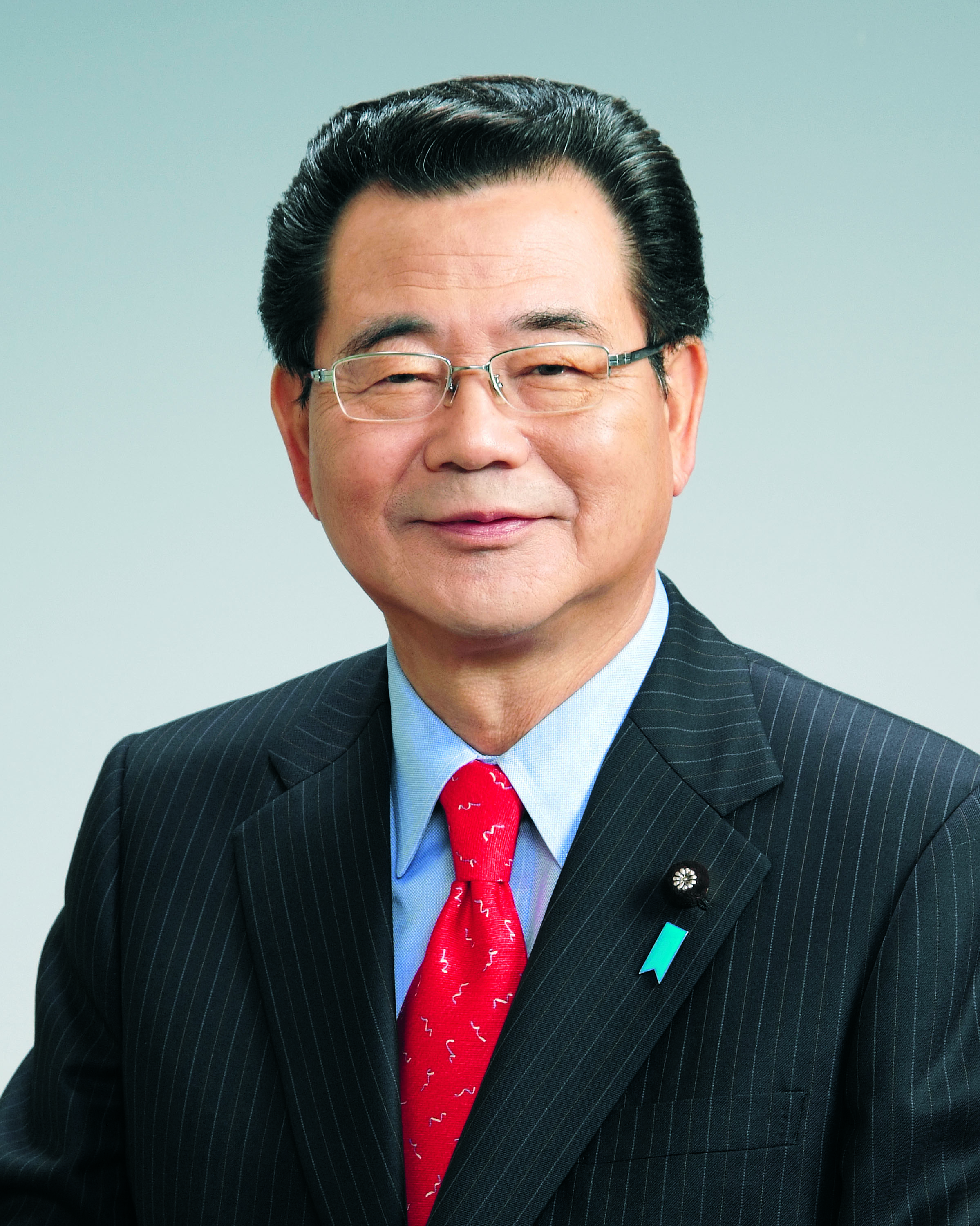
- Toshiei Mizuochi, Japanese politician
- Pronunciation: toɕiei (IPA)
- Gender: Male

Origin
- Origin: Japanese
- Meaning: Different meanings depending on the kanji used

Other names
- Alternative spelling: Tosiei (Kunrei-shiki) Tosiei (Nihon-shiki) Toshiei (Hepburn)

Toshiei is a masculine Japanese given name.

== Written forms ==
Toshiei can be written using different combinations of kanji characters. Some examples:

- 敏英, "agile, hero"
- 敏栄, "agile, prosperity"
- 敏映, "agile, reflect"
- 敏瑛, "agile, crystal"
- 敏永, "agile, eternity"
- 敏衛, "agile, defense"
- 俊英, "talented, hero"
- 俊栄, "talented, prosperity"
- 俊映, "talented, reflect"
- 俊瑛, "talented, crystal"
- 俊永, "talented, eternity"
- 俊衛, "talented, defense"
- 利英, "benefit, hero"
- 利栄, "benefit, prosperity"
- 利映, "benefit, reflect"
- 利瑛, "benefit, crystal"
- 年英, "year, hero"
- 年栄, "year, prosperity"
- 寿英, "long life, hero"
- 寿栄, "long life, prosperity"

The name can also be written in hiragana としえい or katakana トシエイ.

== Notable people with the name ==
- Toshiei Honma (本間 敏栄; born 1935), Japanese ice hockey player.
- Toshiei Kiyosawa (清沢 俊英; 1890-1980), Japanese labor activist and politician.
- Toshiei Mizuochi (水落 敏栄; born 1943), Japanese politician.
