= Iwaoka =

Iwaoka (written: 岩岡) is a Japanese surname. Notable people with the surname include:

- Hisae Iwaoka (岩岡 ヒサエ, born 1976), Japanese manga artist
- Joji Iwaoka (岩岡 譲二, born 1933), Japanese ice hockey player
