= Hockey at the 1960 Olympics =

Hockey at the 1960 Olympics may refer to:

- Ice hockey at the 1960 Winter Olympics
- Field hockey at the 1960 Summer Olympics
