= Esashika =

Esashika (written: 江刺家) is a Japanese surname. Notable people with the surname include:

- Kiyoshi Esashika (江刺家 清, born 1948), Japanese ice hockey player
- Susumu Esashika (江刺家 進, born 1937), Japanese bobsledder
