= Robert McVey =

American ice hockey player

Personal information
- Full name: Robert Patrick McVey
- Born: March 14, 1936 (age 90) Hartford, Connecticut, U.S.
Medal record
Men's ice hockey
Representing the United States
Olympic Games
| Gold medal – first place | 1960 Squaw Valley | Team competition |

Robert Patrick McVey (born March 14, 1936) is an American ice hockey player. He won a gold medal at the 1960 Winter Olympics, bringing home the US's first Olympic Hockey Gold Medal while playing on the team's top line with Bill Cleary and Bob Cleary. He went to Harvard and then onto the Olympics after turning down a professional offer from the Boston Bruins to play for their top minor league team the Kingston Frontenacs (EPHL) in 1959. He lived in Hamden, Connecticut, and now lives in Florida.

He attended Choate Rosemary Hall and graduated in the class of 1954.
