= Hideo Suzuki =

Hideo Suzuki may refer to:

- Hideo Suzuki (鈴木 秀夫, Suzuki Hideo, born 1949), Japanese ice hockey player, see List of Olympic men's ice hockey players for Japan
- Hideo Suzuki, Japanese film director, see List of Japanese films of 1960, 1961, 1962, 1963, etc.
