= Robert Forhan =

Canadian ice hockey player (1936–2018)

- Born: March 27, 1936 Newmarket, Ontario, Canada
- Died: June 3, 2018 (aged 82) Newmarket, Ontario, Canada
- Height: 5 ft 9 in (175 cm)
- Weight: 175 lb (79 kg; 12 st 7 lb)
- Position: Right Wing
- Shot: Right
- Played for: Greensboro Generals; Cleveland Barons
- Playing career: 1955–1969
Medal record
Men's Ice hockey
Representing Canada
Silver medal – second place	1960 Squaw Valley	Ice hockey

Robert Norman "Bob" Forhan (March 27, 1936 – June 3, 2018) was a Canadian ice hockey right winger and politician who competed in the 1960 and 1964 Winter Olympics.

== Early life ==
Born in Newmarket, Ontario, Forhan played for the Guelph Biltmores, Sudbury Wolves, Greensboro Generals, and Cleveland Barons.

== Career ==
Forhan won a silver medal at the 1960 Winter Olympics in ice hockey. He finished fourth at the 1964 Winter Olympics in ice hockey.

After his playing career, Forhan became a high school teacher and then embarked on a political career from 1970s to 1996. He served on the Newmarket Town Council, mayor of Newmarket, chair of the Regional Municipality of York (1978 to 1984), and chief administrative officer of the Regional Municipality of York from 1978 to 1995.

In 2010 he was one of the seven "inaugural inductees to the Newmarket Sports Hall of Fame."

== Personal life ==
Forhan died on June 3, 2018, at the age of 82.
