= Jack Kirrane =

American ice hockey player (1928–2016)

- Born: August 20, 1928 Brookline, Massachusetts, U.S.
- Died: September 25, 2016 (aged 88) Brookline, Massachusetts, U.S.
- Height: 5 ft 10 in (178 cm)
- Weight: 170 lb (77 kg; 12 st 2 lb)
- Position: Defense
- Shot: Left
- Played for: Boston Olympics; Worcester Warriors
- National team: United States
- Playing career: 1947–1963
Medal record
Men's Ice hockey
Representing United States
Gold medal – first place	1960 Squaw Valley	Ice hockey

John Joseph Kirrane Jr. (/kɪˈreɪn/; August 20, 1928 – September 25, 2016) was an American ice hockey player. Kirrane was a member of the United States 1948 Winter Olympics and 1960 Winter Olympics teams, winning the gold medal in 1960. He was inducted into the United States Hockey Hall of Fame in 1987. Kirrane went on to serve 38 years with the Brookline, Massachusetts Fire Department and also spent 15 years as the rink manager of the Bright Hockey Center at Harvard University.

== Playing career ==
Kirrane began playing hockey as a child on a neighbor's pond with his brothers. In high school, he participated in baseball, track and field, football and ice hockey. In 1948, at 19 years of age Kirrane became the youngest member of the United States Olympic ice hockey team. When the team headed to St. Moritz, Switzerland to take part in the Olympic Games, there was a conflict over Olympic eligibility (the tournament was strictly amateur at the time) and two United States teams were sent. It was a situation that nearly caused the cancellation of the entire ice hockey tournament. Eventually a compromise was made. Kirrane's team was allowed to play, but were disqualified from medal contention. In the end the disqualification was unnecessary as the United States finished the tournament in fourth place. Following the Olympics Kirrane continued to play amateur hockey for the Boston Olympics in the Eastern Amateur Hockey League (EAHL), a farm team of the National Hockey League's Boston Bruins. He lost out on a chance at an NHL career when he was drafted into the United States Army to serve in the Korean War. When he returned home from the Army, he became a firefighter in his home town of Brookline, Massachusetts. He played one more season in the EAHL this time with the Worcester Warriors. In 1957, two years after his last season in the EAHL, Kirrane again played for the US national team and led his senior team to the Amateur Hockey Association of the United States National Senior Championship.

Leading up to the 1960 Winter Olympics Kirrane had an opportunity to play for Team USA once more. In order to play for the team he had to take an unpaid leave from the fire department. He also needed to sell his pickup truck in order to afford a plane ticket, as at the time players who tried out for the national teams paid their own way. The 1960 team was hastily put together and a few days before the tournament was set to begin head coach Jack Riley planned to add brothers Bill and Bob Cleary. Their late addition caused players to threaten a boycott. However, Kirrane opposed the idea, and stated that he was going to play even if it meant going on the ice alone, after which the talk of a boycott ended. Twelve years after being the youngest player on his first Olympic team Kirrane, the oldest player in 1960, was named team captain.

Team USA entered the tournament as underdogs. They had a "terrific" start to the Olympics but in the championship round had to face Canada and the Soviet Union back to back. The Canadians had dominated the Americans registering a 15–2–2 record in World Championship and Olympic play between 1920 and 1959. However, the United States upset Canada 2–1. Team USA next played the Soviet Union. Similar to the Canadians the Soviets held a 5–0 record against the US leading up to the tournament, outscoring the Americans 21–5 in those games. Team USA pulled off its second straight upset defeating the Soviets 3–2. In their final game the Americans faced Czechoslovakia. A win would give the US the gold, but a loss meant that they would receive silver with the Canadians taking the gold medal. After two periods of play, Team USA trailed 4–3. They rallied with six third period goals to win the game 9–4, earning the United States its first Olympic gold medal in ice hockey. After the medal presentation Kirrane received a congratulatory telegram from fellow Brookline native John F. Kennedy, then a US Senator. When he returned home Kirrane was taken from the airport on top of a firetruck, and a banquet was held in his honor at the Brookline High gym.

Kirrane made one more foray into competitive hockey, playing with the US national team in 1963. Team USA struggled at the World Championships losing all but two games, defeating West Germany 8–4 and tying East Germany 3–3. The United States three points tied them with three other nations, but due to their goal differential, Team USA officially finished last. In 1987 Kirrane was inducted into the United States Hockey Hall of Fame.

== Non-hockey activities ==
Kirrane worked 38 years as a firefighter for the Brookline fire department, finishing his career as a Lieutenant on Ladder Co. 2. He married a woman named Pat, and the couple had three children together. He remained close to hockey working as the rink manager for Harvard University's Bright Hockey Center for 15 years. In December 2010, a skating rink in Brookline was named in his honor at Larz Anderson Park. Coincidentally, the rink was constructed on land donated by his former neighbors who owned the pond where he learned to play. He died on September 26, 2016, at the age of 88.
