= Bengt Lindqvist (ice hockey) =

Swedish ice hockey player (1934–2023)

Personal information
- Nationality: Swedish
- Born: 21 April 1934 Eskilstuna, Sweden
- Died: 28 April 2023 (aged 89)

Sport
- Sport: Ice hockey

Bengt Lindqvist (21 April 1934 – 28 April 2023) was a Swedish ice hockey player. He competed in the men's tournament at the 1960 Winter Olympics.
