= Kunito Takagi =

Japanese ice hockey player

Personal information
- Nationality: Japanese
- Born: 18 June 1934 (age 91)

Sport
- Sport: Ice hockey

Kunito Takagi (高木 邦人, Takagi Kunito; born 18 June 1934) is a Japanese ice hockey player. He competed in the men's tournament at the 1960 Winter Olympics.
