= Chikashi Akazawa =

Japanese ice hockey player

Personal information
- Nationality: Japanese
- Born: 5 November 1934 (age 90); Sapporo, Japan

Sport
- Sport: Ice hockey

Chikashi Akazawa (赤沢 親, Akazawa Chikashi, born 5 November 1934) is a Japanese ice hockey player. He competed in the men's tournament at the 1960 Winter Olympics.
