= Maurice Benoit =

Canadian ice hockey player (1932–2013)

- Born: July 26, 1932 Valleyfield, Quebec, Canada
- Died: December 10, 2013 (aged 81) Dayton, Ohio, USA
- Height: 5 ft 11 in (180 cm)
- Weight: 180 lb (82 kg; 12 st 12 lb)
- Position: Defence
- Shot: Left
- Played for: Omaha Knights; Toledo Blades; Dayton Gems
- National team: Canada
- Playing career: 1955–1970

Olympic medal record

Men's ice hockey

Representing Canada
Silver medal – second place	1960 Squaw Valley	Ice hockey

World Championship
Gold medal – first place	1959 Prague	Team

Joseph Maurice Leo "Moe" Benoit (July 26, 1932 – December 10, 2013) was a Canadian professional hockey defenseman.

Benoit was born in Valleyfield, Quebec, and started playing professional hockey in 1948 for the Montreal Royals. After a five-year break, he began playing again for the Trois-Rivières Lions. He had successful seasons with the Belleville McFarlands—the 1959 Team Canada that won the World Championships in Prague, Czechoslovakia. and also played for the Kingston Frontenacs in the late 1950s. Benoit helped the Canadian Olympic Hockey Team get the silver medal in the 1960 Winter Olympics.

After his Olympic success, he moved to the United States, where he was a player (and also a coach) for the Omaha Knights and Toledo Blades. In 1966, Benoit joined the Dayton Gems, with whom he played until his retirement in 1970. He won the Turner Cup twice—with the Blades in 1964 as the player-coach and with the Gems in 1969, also sharing the IHL 1968–69 best defenseman award with his teammate Alain Beaulé. Benoit also coached numerous youth hockey teams in Dayton throughout the 1970s. Benoit was inducted into the Dayton Hockey Hall of Fame in 1973 and the Toledo Hockey Hall of Fame in 2019. died December 10, 2013, in Dayton, Ohio.
