= Bob McKnight =

Canadian ice hockey player (1938–2021)

- Born: March 19, 1938; North Bay, Ontario, Canada
- Died: March 21, 2021 (aged 83)
- Height: 5 ft 10 in (178 cm)
- Weight: 185 lb (84 kg; 13 st 3 lb)
- Position: Left wing
- Shot: Left
- Played for: Kitchener-Waterloo Dutchmen; Galt Terriers
- National team: Canada
- Playing career: 1958–1967

Bob McKnight
Medal record

Representing Canada

Men's Ice Hockey
Silver medal – second place	1960 Squaw Valley	Team

Robert McKnight (March 19, 1938 – March 21, 2021) was an ice hockey player who played for the Canadian national team. He won a silver medal at the 1960 Winter Olympics.
