= Georg Eberl =

German ice hockey player (1936–2023)

Personal information
- Nationality: German
- Born: 11 May 1936; Bad Tölz, Gau Munich-Upper Bavaria, Germany
- Died: 1 January 2023 (aged 86); Bad Tölz, Germany

Sport
- Sport: Ice hockey

Georg Eberl (11 May 1936 – 1 January 2023) was a German ice hockey player. He competed in the men's tournament at the 1960 Winter Olympics.
