= Jack Douglas (ice hockey) =

Canadian ice hockey player

Personal information
- Born: April 24, 1930 Trenton, Ontario, Canada
- Died: January 12, 2003 (aged 72)

Sport
- Sport: Ice hockey
- Position: Defenceman
- Team: Indianapolis Chiefs; Chatham Maroons; Pittsburgh Hornets
Medal record
Representing Canada
Silver medal – second place	1960 Squaw Valley	Ice hockey

John Douglas (April 24, 1930 – January 12, 2003) was a Canadian ice hockey defenceman who competed in the 1960 Winter Olympics.

== Early life ==
Douglas was born in Trenton, Ontario. He played junior hockey with Pembroke Lumber Kings.

== Career ==
Douglas won the silver medal at the 1960 Winter Olympics in ice hockey. He also played for Indianapolis Chiefs, Chatham Maroons, and Pittsburgh Hornets. Douglas played one match in the American Hockey League and 119 matches in the International Hockey League. Throughout his hockey career, he was known for his "six inch slapper," a powerful slapshot performed by moving his stick only six inches.
