= Edwyn Owen =

American ice hockey player

- Born: June 8, 1936 Minneapolis, Minnesota, U.S.
- Died: October 5, 2007 (aged 71)
- Height: 5 ft 11 in (180 cm)
- Weight: 175 lb (79 kg; 12 st 7 lb)
- Position: Defense
- Played for: Harvard Crimson
- National team: United States
Medal record
Men's Ice hockey
Representing United States
Gold medal – first place	1960 Squaw Valley	Ice hockey

Edwyn Robert "Bob" Owen (June 8, 1936 – October 5, 2007) was an American star hockey player at Harvard and played on the 1960 U.S. hockey team that won an Olympic gold medal for the United States. He later battled schizophrenia.

== Ice hockey ==
Owen grew up in St. Louis Park, Minnesota, and attended Harvard University, where he was a defenseman on three Ivy League championship teams. In 1957, he won Harvard's Angier Trophy for the player who made the greatest improvement. He graduated from Harvard in 1958. At his induction into the Harvard Varsity Club Hall of Fame in 1982, he was described as a "hard-hitting player who could move an opponent from in front of the net."

He was on the 1960 Winter Olympics hockey team with several of his Harvard teammates, including Bill Cleary and Bob Cleary, winning the gold by beating Canada, the Soviets and Czechoslovakia. It was the nation’s first gold medal in men’s hockey.

== Mental breakdown ==
He visited Communist countries with the U.S. national hockey team in 1959 and worked on classified projects at a balloon company Raven Industries in Sioux Falls, South Dakota beginning in 1960. He later described these times to his friends as specifically troubling and paranoia-inducing.

Owen had a breakdown in 1963 in San Francisco. In the late 1960s, he moved to Topeka, Kansas where he committed himself to the Menninger Clinic for treatment for schizophrenia. He would be released from the in-patient facility three years later, but never moved more than four miles from the hospital.

== Community involvement ==
In 1973, he began teaching at Washburn University School of Business. Owen became a local hero in Topeka hockey, so much so that the adult hockey league in that city named its championship cup after him (the Owen Cup). He also helped to construct numerous veterans monuments in the Topeka area.

== Death ==
On October 5, 2007, a white Lincoln Continental was found burning in a field in Topeka, Kansas. A body was found inside, severely burned. A week later it was determined to be the remains of Edwyn Owen. The Kansas State Fire Marshall's Office determined that the car's heated catalytic converter set fire to the dense dry grass around the vehicle. Only later was Owen's increasingly bizarre behavior reported. He hung up abruptly on the phone with old friends, left rambling telephone messages, and claimed he was a character in a fictional children's book.

== Sources ==
- Carlson, James "Body ID'd as Olympian's" The Topeka Capital-Journal 9 Oct. 2007 A1
- Carlson, James "Part 1: The Bob Owen Story" The Topeka Capital-Journal 2 July 2008 A1
- Carlson, James "Obsessed, Owen's Mind Falters" The Topeka Capital-Journal 3 July 2008 A1
- Carlson, James "Owen Looks for Help at Menninger" The Topeka Capital-Journal 4 July 2008 A1
- Carlson, James "Vets, Hockey Offer Owen an Outlet" The Topeka Capital-Journal 5 July 2008 A1
- Carlson, James "Owen's Life, Death, a Puzzle, an Enigma" The Topeka Capital-Journal 6 July 2008 A2
