= George Samolenko =

Canadian ice hockey player (born 1930)

Personal information
- Nickname: George Samsen
- Born: December 20, 1930 (age 95) Oshawa, Ontario, Canada

Sport
- Sport: Ice hockey
- Team: Oshawa Generals; Whitby Dunlops; Kitchener-Waterloo Dutchmen
Medal record
Men's Ice hockey
Representing Canada
Silver medal – second place	1960 Squaw Valley	Ice hockey

George R. Samolenko (born December 20, 1930), later known as George Samsen, is a Canadian former ice hockey player who competed and won a silver medal in the 1960 Winter Olympics. He was born in Oshawa, Ontario.

== Career ==
From 1947 to 1949, Samolenko played with the Winnipeg Monarchs. Afterward, he moved to the Ontario Junior Hockey League where he played two seasons with the Oshawa Generals. He decided to play with the Eastern Ontario Hockey League, spending his first season with the Kingston Goodyears. In 1956, Samolenko joined the Whitby Dunlops He received an Allan Cup, which got his team in a position to play in the 1958 World Ice Hockey Championships. The Dunlops brought home a gold medal from the tournament. They won a second Allan Cup in 1959, which gave them the ability to compete in the 1960 Winter Olympics, but they turned down the opportunity. That opportunity was then given to the Kitchener-Waterloo Dutchmen. At the Olympics, Samolenko won a silver medal. After the victory, Samolenko retired.
