= Vic Ekberg =

Australian ice hockey player (1932–2020)

Personal information
- Nationality: Australian
- Born: 16 June 1932; Canada
- Died: 27 July 2020 (aged 88)

Sport
- Sport: Ice hockey

Vic Ekberg (16 June 1932 – 27 July 2020) was an Australian ice hockey player. He competed in the men's tournament at the 1960 Winter Olympics.
