= David Cunningham (ice hockey) =

Australian ice hockey player (1928–2020)

Personal information
- Nationality: Australian
- Born: 19 October 1928; Brunswick, Victoria, Australia
- Died: 20 October 2020 (aged 92)

Sport
- Sport: Ice hockey

David Cunningham (19 October 1928 – 20 October 2020) was an Australian ice hockey player. He competed in the men's tournament at the 1960 Winter Olympics.

Born on October 19, 1928, in Brunswick, Melbourne, he was the son of Mitchell Doig Cunningham and Ann Marsh Coates. His older brother, Lawrence, was also a hockey player. Cunningham began learning the game during the 1940s, a period when competitive hockey had paused due to World War II. He trained under John Tuckerman at the Melbourne Glaciarium, where young players practiced intensively during general skating sessions, developing edge control, skating techniques, and game strategy.

Cunningham's skills developed rapidly, and by 1946 he was playing for Northern Suburbs and representing Victoria in his debut season at just 18 years old. The following year, he became a founding player of the Blackhawks, teaming up with Tuckerman and Frosty Winter on a forward line that became one of the most respected in Australian ice hockey. A decade later, Cunningham and teammate Noel Derrick remained as the only original members still playing, forming a formidable offensive unit with Keith Jose.

Cunningham was widely respected for his tough, fearless playing style and his unwavering dedication to his teammates. His commitment and skill earned him the distinction of being referred to as "the best Australian-born player we have had," a title that reflected both his natural talent and the high regard in which he was held by the hockey community. His potential was recognized early in his career; in 1948, prominent Australian sports commentator Ron Casey included Cunningham in his All-Australian Team.
