= Jaroslav Volf (ice hockey) =

Czech ice hockey player

Personal information
- Nationality: Czech
- Born: 8 August 1933; Dubí, Czechoslovakia
- Died: 13 December 1990 (aged 57)

Sport
- Sport: Ice hockey

Jaroslav Volf (8 August 1933 – 13 December 1990) was a Czech ice hockey player. He competed in the men's tournament at the 1960 Winter Olympics.
