= Noel McLoughlin =

Australian ice hockey player

Personal information
- Nationality: Australian
- Born: 15 September 1929 Melbourne, Australia
- Died: 19 December 2017 (aged 88)

Sport
- Sport: Ice hockey

Noel Peter McLoughlin (15 September 1929 – 19 December 2017) was an Australian ice hockey player. He competed in the men's tournament at the 1960 Winter Olympics.
