= Michael Hobelsberger =

German ice hockey player

Personal information
- Nationality: German
- Born: 25 September 1935; Garmisch-Partenkirchen, Germany
- Died: 11 November 2004 (aged 69); Garmisch-Partenkirchen, Germany

Sport
- Sport: Ice hockey

Michael Hobelsberger (25 September 1935 – 11 November 2004) was a German ice hockey player. He competed in the men's tournaments at the 1960 Winter Olympics and the 1964 Winter Olympics.
