= Rudolf Čillík =

Slovak cross-country skier (1931–2022)

Personal information
- Nationality: Slovak
- Born: 7 November 1931; Kremnica, Czechoslovakia
- Died: 9 January 2022 (aged 90); Kremnica, Slovakia

Sport
- Sport: Cross-country skiing

Rudolf Čillík (born 7 November 1931 – 9 January 2022) was a Slovak cross-country skier. He competed in the men's 15 kilometre event at the 1960 Winter Olympics. He also competed at FIS Nordic World Ski Championships in 1962 in Zakopane and 1966 in Oslo.

Čillík entered the Czechoslovak cross-country national team aged 25 and in 1960s, under the coaching of Ján Terezčák, he was Czechoslovakia's top cross-country skier and captain of the national team. He was a member of Baník Kremnica cross-country skiing club, winning nine individual Czechoslovak titles in 15 km, 30 km and 50 km categories. He was the first manager of Gabriela Soukalová. He also coached later gold Olympic medalist racewalker Jozef Pribilinec in his amateur Nordic skiing career.

After his sporting career, Čillík served on various administrative and official positions on Slovak as well as federative level. He was a member of the Ethical Commission within Slovak Olympic Committee. His contributions were recognised by silver and gold medal awards by the Committee in 2002 and 2013. He co-founded and co-organised Biela Stopa SNP race as well Bezrouk Memorial both hosted annually at Skalka pri Kremnici ski resort near Kremnica. The cross-country stadium at Skalka was named in Čillík's honour even prior to his passing. Čillík was buried in his native Kremnica on 12 January 2022.
