= Paul Johnson (ice hockey) =

American ice hockey player (1935–2016)

Personal information
- Full name: Paul Herbert Johnson
- Born: May 18, 1935 West St. Paul, Minnesota, U.S.
- Died: July 17, 2016 (aged 81) West St. Paul, Minnesota, U.S.
- Height: 6 ft 0 in (183 cm)
- Weight: 181 lb (82 kg)
Medal record
Men's ice hockey
Representing the United States
Olympic Games
Gold medal – first place	1960 Squaw Valley	Team competition

Paul Herbert Johnson (May 18, 1935 – July 17, 2016) was an American ice hockey forward.

== Career ==
Johnson was a member of the United States hockey team that won the gold medal at Squaw Valley, California, during the 1960 Winter Olympics. He scored the pivotal go-ahead goal in the medal round game against Canada.

== Personal life ==
Johnson died on July 17, 2016, at the age of 81.
