= Russell Jones (ice hockey) =

Australian ice hockey player (1926–2012)

- Born: 1 September 1926 Carlton, Victoria, Australia
- Died: 1 October 2012 (aged 86)
- Position: Left Wing
- Shot: Right
- Played for: Melbourne Demons; Pirates IHC; Victoria
- National team: Australia
- Playing career: 1945–1963

Russell Anderson Jones (1 September 1926 – 1 October 2012) was an Australian ice hockey player. Jones was a member of the Australian national team during the 1960 Winter Olympics and also competed in the 1962 World Ice Hockey Championships.

== Playing career ==
Jones first started playing ice hockey following the end of World War II, joining the Melbourne-based league at the St Moritz rink in The Esplanade, St Kilda. Jones played for the Melbourne Demons IHC during the 1940s and 1950s. In 1947 he was selected for the Victorian state team to compete at the 1947 Goodall Cup, which they went on to win. Jones again won the Goodall Cup as a player for Victoria on seven more occasions – 1949, 1951, 1952, 1954, 1955, 1961, and 1962. In 1960 Jones was selected to play as a forward for the Australian national team to compete at the 1960 Winter Olympics, which is the only ice hockey team Australia has ever sent to the Olympics. Australia finished last in the competition losing all six of their games. Jones who played in all six games recorded two goals, three assists and finished with four penalties in minutes. He finished second in team scoring behind Dave Cunningham. In 1962 Jones was selected for the Australian national team to compete at the 1962 World Ice Hockey Championships. Australia who were competing in Group B finished thirteenth overall and won their first-ever international game after defeating Denmark 6–2. Jones retired from the sport in 1964.

== Coaching career ==
Following his playing career with the Victorian state team Jones was selected as team coach. As a coach for Victoria, he won his first Goodall Cup in 1965. Following the 1965 win Victoria went on to win the next three years of the Goodall Cup under Jones as coach.

== Personal life ==
Jones was born on 1 September 1926 in Carlton, Victoria, Australia. His son, Martin, is the current Referee in Chief of Ice Hockey Victoria and two of his grandsons, Sean and Mitchell, play in the Australian Ice Hockey League for the Melbourne Mustangs and Melbourne Ice respectively. Ice Hockey Victoria has named their Premier A league trophy after him and Jones was a Life Member of both Ice Hockey Victoria and the Australian Ice Hockey Federation. In 1992 Jones started playing in the veterans' competition, Old-timers Ice Hockey Australia Network, playing most recently for the Night Owls.
