= Kurt Sepp =

German ice hockey player

Personal information
- Nationality: German
- Born: 14 September 1935 (age 91) Füssen, Germany

Sport
- Sport: Ice hockey

Kurt Sepp (born 14 September 1935) is a German ice hockey player. He competed in the men's tournaments at the 1956 Winter Olympics, the 1960 Winter Olympics and the 1964 Winter Olympics.
