= Jack McCartan =

American ice hockey player

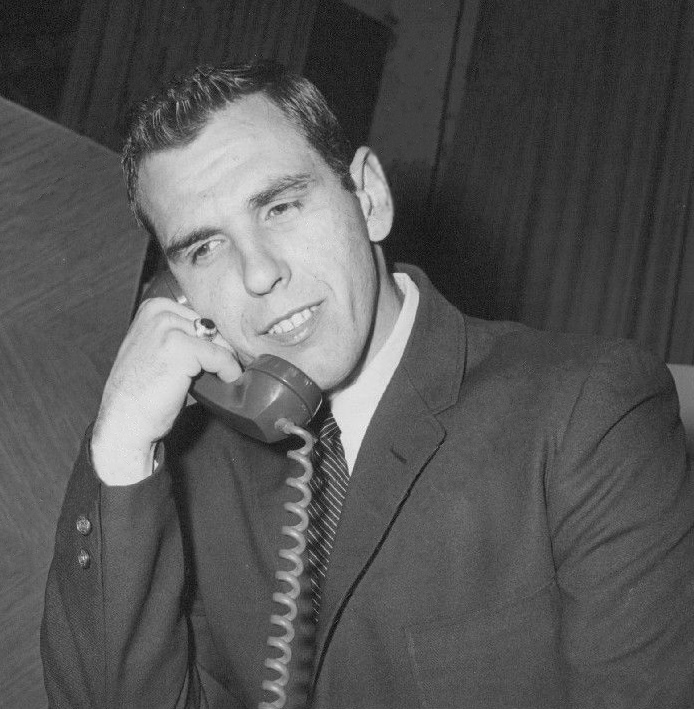
- Jack McCartan, March 2, 1960.
- Born: August 5, 1935 (age 91) Saint Paul, Minnesota, U.S.
- Height: 6 ft 1 in (185 cm)
- Weight: 196 lb (89 kg; 14 st 0 lb)
- Position: Goaltender
- Caught: Left
- Played for: New York Rangers; Minnesota Fighting Saints
- National team: United States
- Playing career: 1959–1974
Medal record
Representing United States
Men's ice hockey
Olympic Games
Gold medal – first place	1960 Squaw Valley	Team
Men's baseball
Pan American Games
Bronze medal – third place	1959 Chicago	Team

John William McCartan (born August 5, 1935) is an American retired goaltender. He played for the American national team at the 1960 Winter Olympics, winning a gold medal. He later played 12 games in the National Hockey League with the New York Rangers during the 1959–60 and 1960–61 seasons, and 42 games with the Minnesota Fighting Saints of the World Hockey Association from 1972 to 1974. He was inducted into the United States Hockey Hall of Fame in 1983, and into the International Ice Hockey Federation Hall of Fame in 1998.

== Playing career ==
McCartan was born in Saint Paul, Minnesota. He was a college standout at the University of Minnesota from 1955 to 1958. McCartan also played baseball at Minnesota. McCartan was named First Team All-America after the 1957–1958 season. He played for the bronze medal-winning US team in baseball at the 1959 Pan American Games. After graduating, he joined the U.S. Army. While in the army, he joined the United States Olympic hockey team. His efforts helped the U.S. team defeat Canada, the Soviet Union, and Czechoslovakia and win the gold medal at Squaw Valley. For his efforts, he was named as the "All-World" goaltender of the Winter Games.

The New York Rangers gave him a four-game trial late in the 1959–60 season and he did quite well, the highlight being a save on Gordie Howe of the Detroit Red Wings. He had maintained his amateur status by not signing a contract with the Rangers. Instead, he acted on advice from his University of Minnesota hockey coach John Mariucci and was paid $1,000 a game with the hope that good performances would get him a contract worth more than the $7,000 National Hockey League minimum. Attendance at Madison Square Garden for his four starts totaled 48,340 which was about 10,000 more than anticipated for a team that had been eliminated from playoff contention. After getting a win, two draws, and a loss and stopping 92 of 99 shots on goal, McCartan signed with the Rangers for the following season for more than $10,000.

He could not duplicate his success in the NHL. Coach Alf Pike decided to alternate Gump Worsley and McCartan in 1960–61, but when McCartan gave up 36 goals in 7½ games, Worsley became the full-time goaltender and McCartan was demoted to the minors. He played for several minor league teams over the next several years. He played in the Eastern Professional League, Western League, Central League, and World Hockey Association. In the early 1970s, he resurfaced when the Minnesota Fighting Saints of the World Hockey Association signed him, but he retired after two seasons.

== Post-playing career ==
He later scouted for the Vancouver Canucks.

== Career statistics ==
=== Regular season and playoffs ===
			Regular season									Playoffs
Season	Team	League	GP	W	L	T	MIN	GA	SO	GAA	SV%	GP	W	L	MIN	GA	SO	GAA	SV%
1955–56	University of Minnesota	WIHL	24	—	—	—	1440	67	0	2.79	—	—	—	—	—	—	—	—	—
1956–57	University of Minnesota	WIHL	15	—	—	—	900	43	0	2.87	—	—	—	—	—	—	—	—	—
1957–58	University of Minnesota	WIHL	28	—	—	—	1680	89	1	3.18	—	—	—	—	—	—	—	—	—
1958–59	American National Team	Intl	29	—	—	—	1740	104	0	3.65	.881	—	—	—	—	—	—	—	—
1959–60	New York Rangers	NHL	4	1	1	2	240	7	0	1.75	.945	—	—	—	—	—	—	—	—
1959–60	Minneapolis Millers	IHL	5	—	—	—	300	17	1	3.40	—	—	—	—	—	—	—	—	—
1960–61	New York Rangers	NHL	8	1	6	1	440	35	1	4.77	.854	—	—	—	—	—	—	—	—
1960–61	Kitchener Beavers	EPHL	52	25	21	6	3120	145	2	2.79	—	7	3	4	421	20	2	2.85	—
1961–62	Kitchener Beavers	EPHL	70	36	24	10	4200	217	5	3.10	—	7	3	4	451	20	0	2.66	—
1962–63	Los Angeles Blades	WHL	60	31	27	2	3600	187	4	3.12	—	3	1	2	181	9	0	2.98	—
1963–64	St. Louis Braves	CHL	67	31	30	6	4020	262	3	3.91	—	6	2	4	361	27	0	4.49	—
1964–65	St. Louis Braves	CHL	5	1	4	0	300	27	0	5.40	—	—	—	—	—	—	—	—	—
1964–65	Los Angeles Blades	WHL	32	8	22	2	1948	122	1	3.76	—	—	—	—	—	—	—	—	—
1965–66	San Francisco Seals	WHL	53	23	27	3	3299	183	2	3.40	—	—	—	—	—	—	—	—	—
1966–67	California Seals	WHL	61	25	26	10	3784	200	1	3.17	—	5	2	3	300	13	0	2.60	—
1967–68	Omaha Knights	CHL	43	9	25	7	2380	148	1	3.77	.892	—	—	—	—	—	—	—	—
1968–69	San Diego Gulls	WHL	43	20	14	6	2380	134	0	3.38	.906	1	0	0	20	2	0	6.00	—
1969–70	San Diego Gulls	WHL	52	21	20	9	3025	162	3	3.21	.904	4	0	3	199	19	0	5.73	—
1970–71	San Diego Gulls	WHL	55	24	20	11	3239	161	3	2.98	.900	6	2	4	379	24	0	3.80	—
1971–72	San Diego Gulls	WHL	36	14	16	2	1955	112	0	3.44	—	2	0	2	118	6	0	3.05	—
1972–73	Minnesota Fighting Saints	WHA	38	15	19	1	2160	129	1	3.58	.891	4	1	2	213	14	0	3.94	—
1973–74	Minnesota Fighting Saints	WHA	2	0	0	0	42	5	0	7.14	.808	—	—	—	—	—	—	—	—
1973–74	Suncoast Suns	SHL	6	1	4	0	323	26	0	4.83	.849	—	—	—	—	—	—	—	—
1974–75	Minnesota Fighting Saints	WHA	2	1	0	0	61	5	0	4.92	.868	—	—	—	—	—	—	—	—
WHA totals			42	16	19	1	2263	139	1	3.69	.888	4	1	2	213	14	0	3.94	—
NHL totals			12	2	7	3	680	42	1	3.71	.886	—	—	—	—	—	—	—	—

=== International ===
Year	Team	Event	GP	W	L	T	MIN	GA	SO	GAA	SV%
1960	United States	OLY	5	5	0	0	300	11	0	2.20	.918
Senior totals			5	5	0	0	300	11	0	2.20	.918

== Awards and honours ==
Award	Year
All-WIHL First Team	1956–57
AHCA First Team All-American	1956–57
All-WIHL First Team	1957–58
AHCA West All-American	1957–58

- Named Best Goaltender at Olympic Games (1960)
- WHL Second All-Star Team (1969)
- WHL First All-Star Team (1970, 1971)
- Inducted into the International Ice Hockey Federation Hall of Fame in 1998
