= Weldon Olson =

American ice hockey player (1932–2023)

Personal information
- Born: November 12, 1932 Marquette, Michigan, U.S.
- Died: May 13, 2023 (aged 90) Findlay, Ohio, U.S.
Medal record
Men's ice hockey
Representing the United States
Olympic Games
Silver medal – second place	1956 Cortina d'Ampezzo	Team competition
Gold medal – first place	1960 Squaw Valley	Team competition

Weldon Howard "Weldy" Olson (November 12, 1932 – May 13, 2023) was an American ice hockey player. He won a silver medal at the 1956 Winter Olympics and a gold medal at the 1960 Winter Olympics. In his Olympic career, he played in 14 games and scored 7 goals.

Olson played hockey for the Michigan State Spartans from 1951 to 1955. He was the team MVP, co-captain, and leading scorer. He played in 71 games and scored 125 points. He never missed a game at MSU.

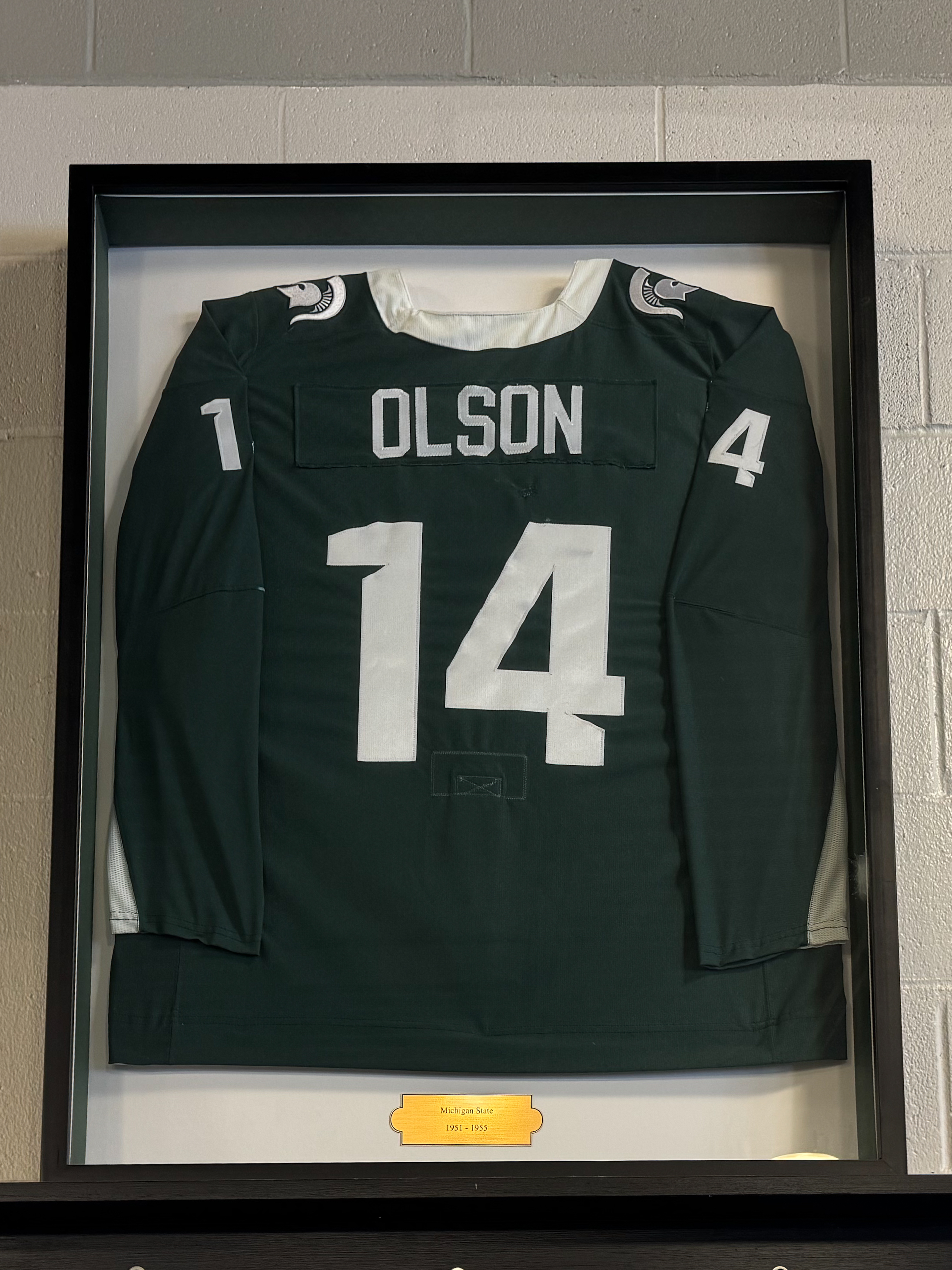
The Michigan State Hockey Jersey of Olympic gold medalist Weldon “Weldy” Olson displayed at The Cube ice skating rink in Findlay, Ohio.

Olson was a member of the MSU Hall of Fame, the Upper Peninsula Sports Hall of Fame the Michigan Amateur Sports Hall of Fame, the Hancock County, Ohio, Sports Hall of Fame, Findlay Amateur Hockey Association Hall of Fame, the United States Olympic Hall of Fame, the United States Hockey Hall of Fame, and in 2002 he received the Lester Patrick Award from the National Hockey League for outstanding service to hockey in the United States.

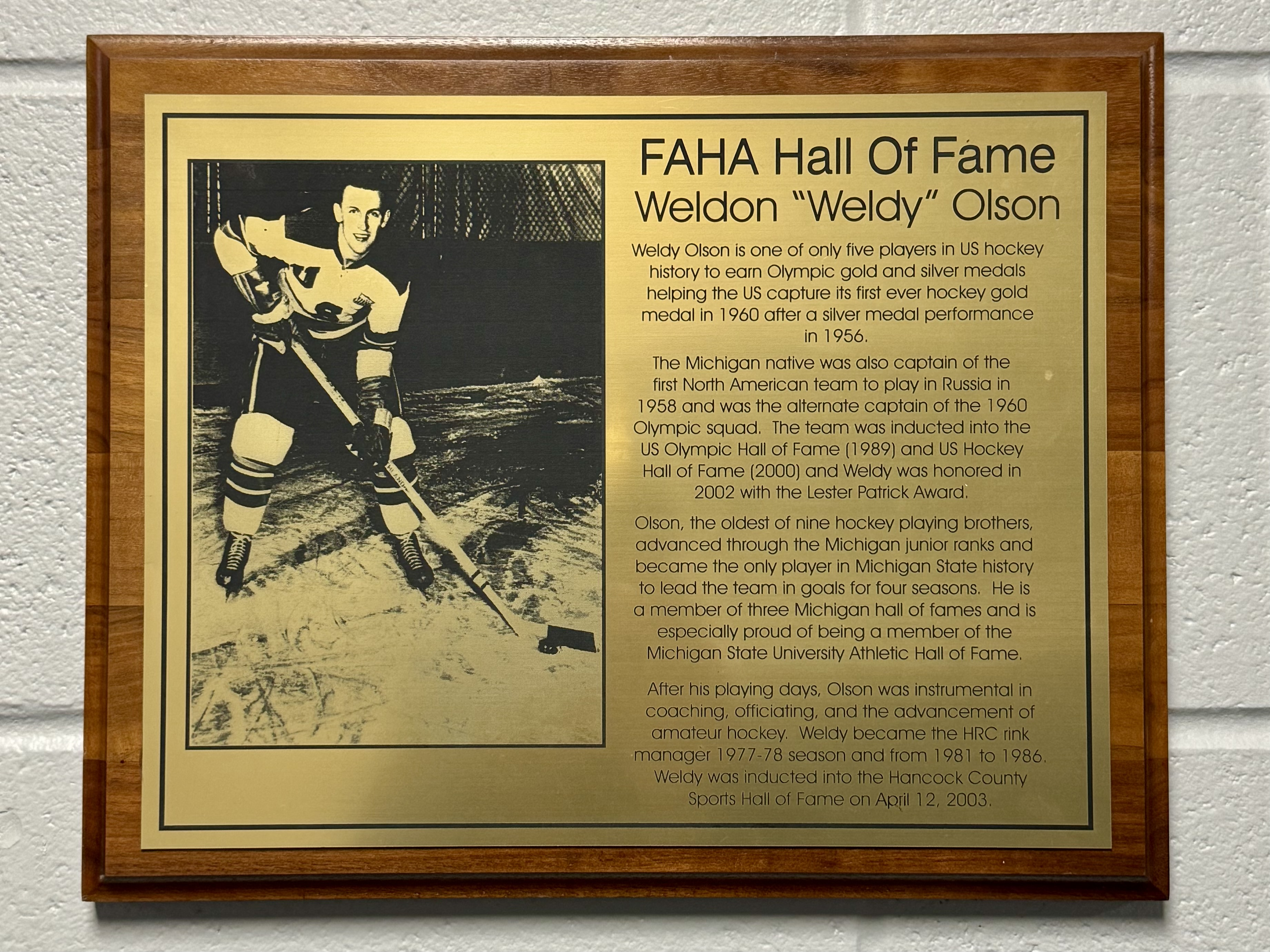
Plaque from the Findlay Amateur Hockey Association Hall of Fame.

Olson resided in Findlay, Ohio. He died there on May 13, 2023, at the age of 90.
