= Kjell Svensson =

Swedish ice hockey player

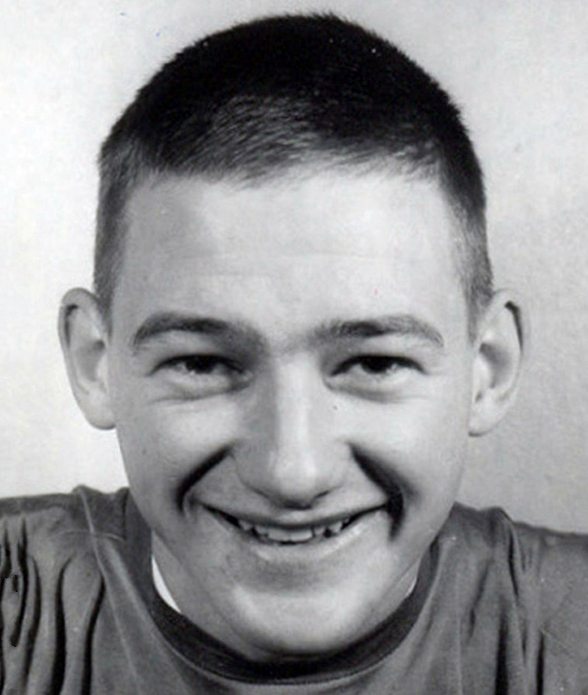
- Kjell Svensson in the early 1960's

Personal information
- Born: 10 September 1938 (age 87) Södertälje, Sweden
- Height: 176 cm (5 ft 9 in)
- Weight: 72 kg (159 lb)

Sport
- Sport: Ice hockey
- Club: Södertälje SK (1954–59, 1962–69); Tabergs SK (1959–60); AIK (1960–62)
Medal record
Representing Sweden
Olympic Games
Silver medal – second place	1964 Innsbruck	Team
World Championships
Gold medal – first place	1962 Colorado Springs/Denver	Team
Silver medal – second place	1963 Stockholm	Team
Bronze medal – third place	1965 Tampere	Team
Silver medal – second place	1967 Vienna	Team

Kjell Gustaf Svensson (born 10 September 1938) is a retired Swedish ice hockey goaltender. He competed at the 1960 and 1964 Olympics and finished in fifth and second place, respectively. He won the world title in 1962, finishing second in 1963 and 1967 and third in 1965. Nationally he won only one title, with Södertälje SK in 1956, but was selected to the Swedish all-star teams in 1960–61 and 1963–64.

After retiring from competitions Svensson worked as a coach with Södertälje SK in 1972 and 1975–78 and with the Swedish national team in 1973–74. He then had a successful career with Scania AB, becoming Senior Vice-President of truck manufacturing. This career made him resign from his position on the board of directors of the Swedish Ice Hockey Association in 1986.
