= Richard Meredith (ice hockey) =

American ice hockey player (1932–2025)

Personal information
- Born: December 22, 1932 South Bend, Indiana, U.S.
- Died: February 6, 2025 (aged 92) Edina, Minnesota
Medal record
Men's ice hockey
Representing the United States
Olympic Games
Gold medal – first place	1960 Squaw Valley	Team competition
Silver medal – second place	1956 Cortina d'Ampezzo	Team competition

Richard Otis Meredith (December 22, 1932 – February 6, 2025) was an American ice hockey player.

== Biography ==
Meredith played college hockey at the University of Minnesota. He won a silver medal at the 1956 Winter Olympics and a gold medal at the 1960 Winter Olympics.

Meredith died in Edina, Minnesota after a brief illness on February 6, 2025, at the age of 92.

== Awards and honors ==
Award	Year
NCAA All-Tournament First Team	1953
