= Rodney Paavola =

American ice hockey player

Rod Paavola
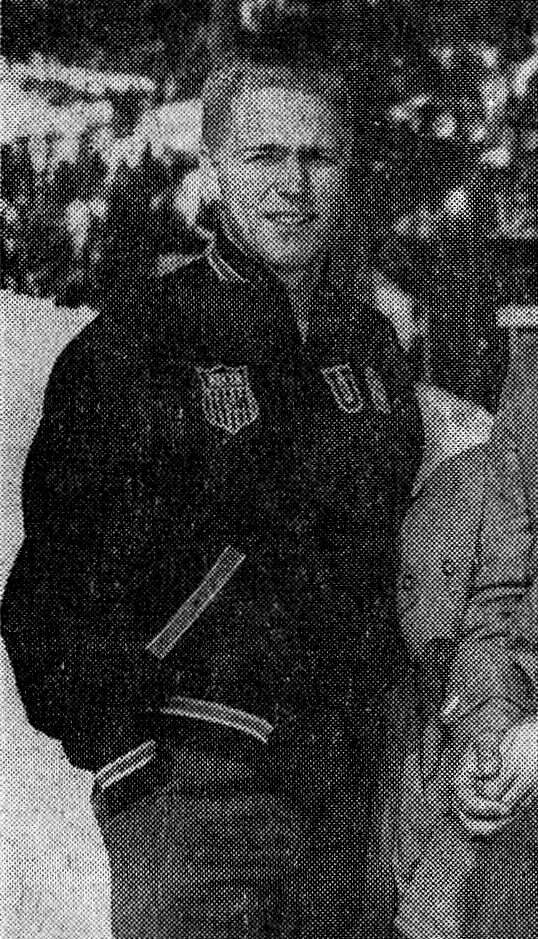
- Paavola in 1960
- Born: August 21, 1939 Hancock, Michigan
- Died: December 3, 1995 (aged 56) Marquette, Michigan
- National team: United States
- Playing career: 1957–1966
Medal record
Men's ice hockey
Representing the United States
Olympic Games
| Gold medal – first place | 1960 Squaw Valley | Team competition |

Rodney Earland Paavola (August 21, 1939 – December 3, 1995) was an American ice hockey player.

Paavola was of Finnish descent. He played football in high school for the Hancock Bulldogs. He won a gold medal at the 1960 Winter Olympics as a member of the US Olympic Ice Hockey Team.
