= Horst Schuldes =

German ice hockey player

Personal information
- Nationality: German
- Born: 18 March 1939; Komotau, Nazi Germany (currently Chomutov, Czech Republic)
- Died: 5 December 2015 (aged 76); Garmisch-Partenkirchen, Germany

Sport
- Sport: Ice hockey

Horst Schuldes (18 March 1939 – 5 December 2015) was a German ice hockey player. He competed in the men's tournaments at the 1960 Winter Olympics and the 1964 Winter Olympics.
