= Robert Reid (ice hockey) =

Australian former ice hockey player

Personal information
- Nationality: Australian
- Born: 21 December 1932 (age 93) Glasgow, Scotland, U.K.

Sport
- Sport: Ice hockey
- Position: Goaltender

Robert William Reid (born 21 December 1932) is an Australian former ice hockey player. He competed in the men's tournament at the 1960 Winter Olympics.
