= Kalevi Rassa =

Finnish ice hockey player

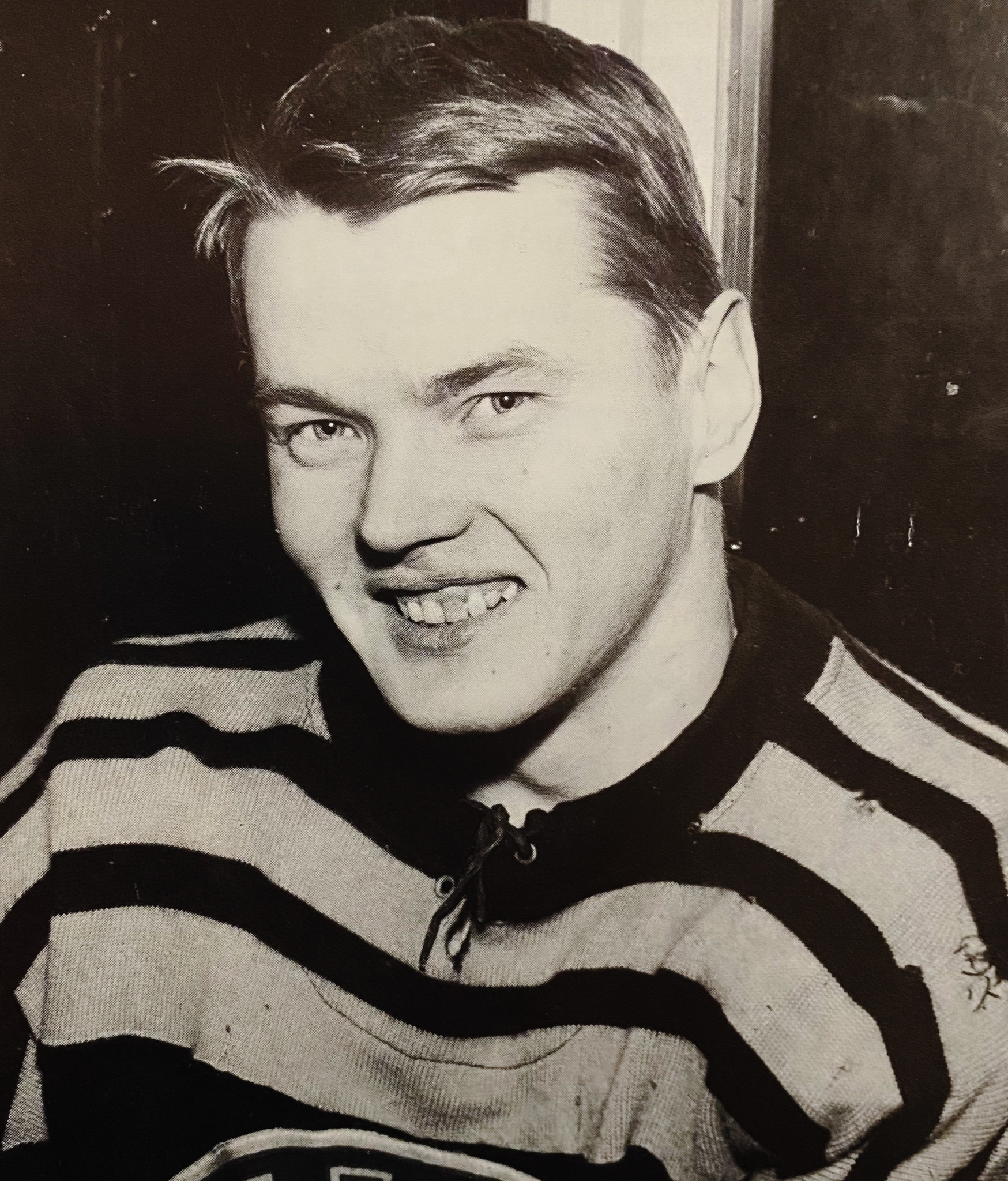

Personal information
- Nationality: Finnish
- Born: 3 February 1936; Loimaa, Finland
- Died: 24 October 1963 (aged 27); Sweden

Sport
- Sport: Ice hockey

Kalevi Rassa (3 February 1936 – 24 October 1963) was a Finnish ice hockey player. He competed in the men's tournament at the 1960 Winter Olympics.
