= Koji Iwamoto (ice hockey) =

Japanese ice hockey player

Personal information
- Nationality: Japanese
- Born: 22 January 1942 (age 84)

Sport
- Sport: Ice hockey

Koji Iwamoto (岩本 宏二, Iwamoto Kōji; born 22 January 1942) is a Japanese ice hockey player. He competed in the men's tournaments at the 1964 Winter Olympics, the 1968 Winter Olympics and the 1972 Winter Olympics.
