= Richard Rodenhiser =

American ice hockey player (born 1932)

Richard Rodenheiser
Personal information
- Born: October 17, 1932 (age 93) Malden, Massachusetts, U.S.
Medal record
Men's ice hockey
Representing the United States
Olympic Games
Gold medal – first place	1960 Squaw Valley	Team competition
Silver medal – second place	1956 Cortina d'Ampezzo	Team competition

Richard Peter "Dick" Rodenhiser (born October 17, 1932) is an American ice hockey player. He won a silver medal at the 1956 Winter Olympics and a gold medal at the 1960 Winter Olympics.

== Awards and honors ==
Award	Year
AHCA First Team All-American	1952–53
