= John Thomas (ice hockey) =

Australian ice hockey player

Personal information
- Nationality: Australian
- Born: 11 March 1936 Melbourne, Australia
- Died: 7 February 1995 (aged 58) Melbourne, Australia

Sport
- Sport: Ice hockey

John Thomas (11 March 1936 – 7 February 1995) was an Australian ice hockey player. He competed in the men's tournament at the 1960 Winter Olympics.
