= Jouni Seistamo =

Finnish ice hockey player (1939–2022)

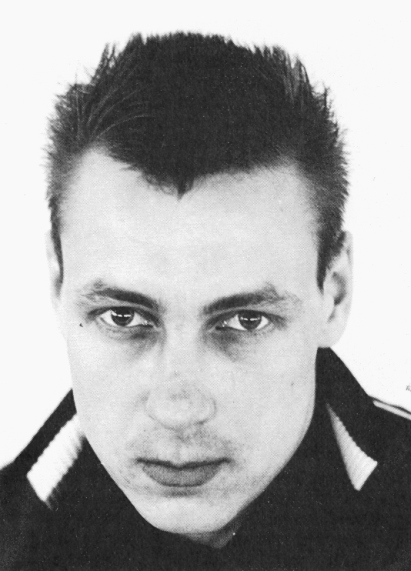
Seistamo circa 1960

Jouni Veli Juhani Seistamo (9 November 1939 – 9 January 2022) was a Finnish professional ice hockey player who played for Tappara in the SM-liiga. Seistamo was born in Tampere on 9 November 1939. He was inducted into the Finnish Hockey Hall of Fame in 1986. He also competed at the 1960 Winter Olympics and the 1964 Winter Olympics. Seistamo died in January 2022, at the age of 82.
