= Jozef Golonka =

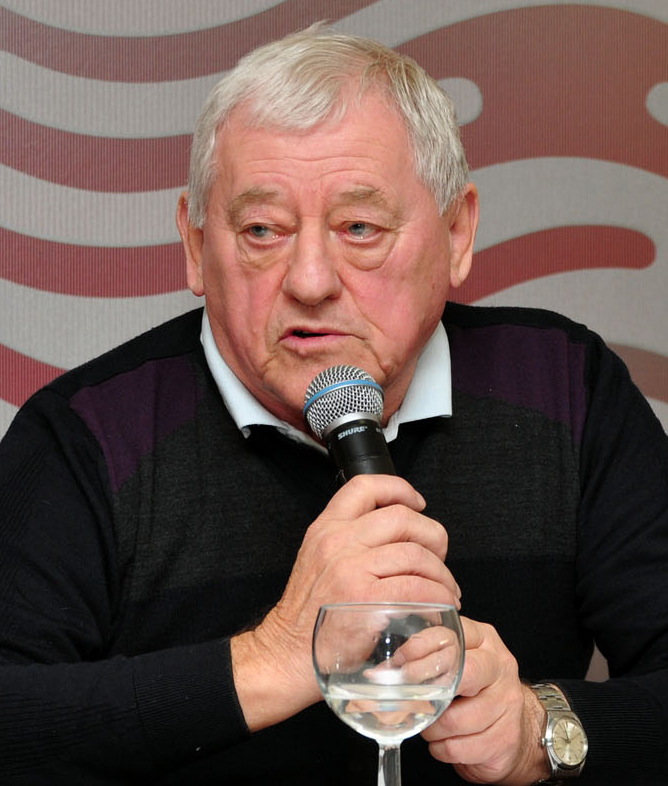
- Born: 6 January 1938 (age 88) Bratislava, Czechoslovakia
- Height: 5 ft 9 in (175 cm)
- Weight: 165 lb (75 kg; 11 st 11 lb)
- Position: Centre
- Shot: Left
- National team: Czechoslovakia
- Playing career: 1955–1972

Medal record

Men's ice hockey

Representing Czechoslovakia

Olympic Games
Bronze medal – third place	1964 Innsbruck	
Silver medal – second place	1968 Grenoble	

World Championships
Bronze medal – third place	1959 Czechoslovakia	
Silver medal – second place	1965 Finland	
Silver medal – second place	1966 Yugoslavia	
Bronze medal – third place	1969 Sweden	

Jozef Golonka (born 6 January 1938) is a Slovak former ice hockey player who played in the Czechoslovak Extraliga and was a member of the Czechoslovakia national ice hockey team. He won a bronze medal in the 1964 Winter Olympics in Innsbruck, Austria and won a silver medal in the 1968 Winter Olympics in Grenoble, France. He was inducted into the International Ice Hockey Federation Hall of Fame in 1998. He is also a member of the Slovak Hockey Hall of Fame (2002), German Ice Hockey Hall of Fame (2004), and Czech Ice Hockey Hall of Fame (2010).

== Career statistics ==
=== International ===
Year	Team	Event	GP	G	A	Pts	PIM
1959	Czechoslovakia	WC	8	7	4	11	2
1960	Czechoslovakia	OLY	7	6	4	10	4
1964	Czechoslovakia	OLY	8	5	2	7	10
1965	Czechoslovakia	WC	7	6	8	14	2
1966	Czechoslovakia	WC	7	2	4	6	4
1967	Czechoslovakia	WC	7	5	6	11	8
1968	Czechoslovakia	OLY	7	4	6	10	8
1969	Czechoslovakia	WC	10	2	1	3	8
Senior totals			61	37	35	72	46
