= Yoshihiro Miyazaki =

Japanese ice hockey player

Personal information
- Nationality: Japanese
- Born: 10 May 1930; Hokkaido, Japan

Sport
- Sport: Ice hockey

Yoshihiro Miyazaki (宮崎 宣宏, Miyazaki Yoshihiro, born 10 May 1930) is a Japanese former ice hockey player. He competed in the men's tournament at the 1960 Winter Olympics.
