= Voitto Soini =

Finnish ice hockey player

Voitto Aukusti Soini (born February 6, 1938, in Koivisto, Finland) is a retired professional ice hockey player who played in the SM-liiga. He played for TPS and TuTo. He was inducted into the Finnish Hockey Hall of Fame in 1986.
