= Basil Hansen =

Australian ice hockey player (1926–2015)

- Born: 7 October 1926 Melbourne, Australia
- Died: 2 January 2015 (aged 88)
- Position: Right Wing
- Played for: Monarchs
- National team: Australia
- Playing career: 1946–1963

Basil Hansen (7 October 1926 – 2 January 2015) was an Australian ice hockey player. Hansen was a member of the Australian national team during the 1960 Winter Olympics.

== Playing career ==
Hansen first started playing ice hockey in 1946 where he joined the Southern Suburbs team playing out of St Kilda's St Moritz. The following year the Southern Suburbs where renamed Monarchs and as well as playing out of St Moritz the team also begun playing at the Glaciarium. In 1954 he was selected for the Victorian state team to compete at the 1954 Goodall Cup, which they went on to win. In 1960 Hansen was selected to play for the Australian national team to compete at the 1960 Winter Olympics, the only ice hockey team Australia has sent to the Olympics. Australia finished last in the competition losing all six of their games. Hansen, who played in four of the six games, recorded one goal and four penalties minutes for the tournament. Hansen continued to play for the Monarchs until 1963 when he retired.

== Coaching career ==
Following his retirement Hansen was selected as coach of the Monarchs, coaching the team until 1965.

== Personal life ==
Hansen was born on 7 October 1926 in Melbourne, Victoria, Australia. He has a son, Greg, who also started playing ice hockey at the age of 12. Hansen and his son joined the Ringwood Juniors. Greg also played for the Raiders IHC and Pirates IHC with Hansen as the coach. In 1973 Hansen started playing for the Night Owls in the veterans' competition, the Old-timers Ice Hockey Australia Network. Hansen is a life member of the Australian Ice Hockey Federation and in 2012 he was named the new Ice Hockey Victoria Patron and was awarded the Hudson Trophy as IHA Sportsman of the Year. He died peacefully on 2 January 2015.
