= Pertti Nieminen =

Finnish ice hockey player

Pertti Ilmari Nieminen (9 December 1936 – 8 November 2016) was a Finnish professional ice hockey player who played in the SM-liiga. Born in Hämeenlinna, Finland, he played for HPK and TPS. He was inducted into the Finnish Hockey Hall of Fame in 1985.
