= Kiyoshi Esashika =

Japanese ice hockey player

Personal information
- Nationality: Japanese
- Born: 23 September 1948 (age 77) Aomori, Japan

Sport
- Sport: Ice hockey

Kiyoshi Esashika (江刺家 清, Esashika Kiyoshi; born 23 September 1948) is a Japanese ice hockey player. He competed in the men's tournament at the 1976 Winter Olympics.
