= Akiyoshi Segawa =

Japanese ice hockey player (born 1934)

Personal information
- Nationality: Japanese
- Born: 31 May 1934 (age 92)
- Height: 170 cm (5 ft 7 in)
- Weight: 72 kg (159 lb; 11 st 5 lb)

Sport
- Sport: Ice hockey

Akiyoshi Segawa (瀬川 昭義, Segawa Akiyoshi; born 31 May 1934) is a Japanese ice hockey player. He competed in the men's tournament at the 1960 Winter Olympics.
