= Teppo Rastio =

Finnish ice hockey player (1934–2023)

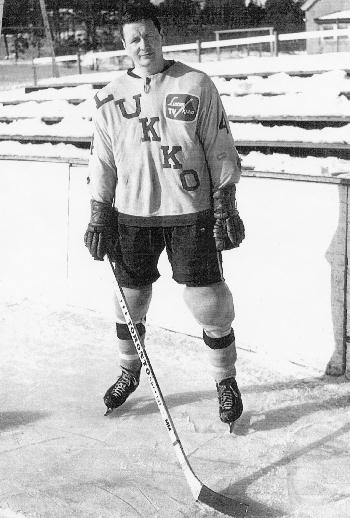
Teppo Rastio in Rauman Lukko

Teppo Edvard Rastio (15 February 1934 – 29 May 2023) was a Finnish professional ice hockey player who played in the SM-liiga for Lukko and Ilves. Rastio was inducted to the Finnish Hockey Hall of Fame in 1985.

Rastio was also known as a footballer. He played two seasons in the Finnish premier division Mestaruussarja for Ilves-Kissat in 1957–1958. Rastio capped once for the Finland national team in 1958.

Rastio died on 29 May 2023, at the age of 89.
