= Juhani Lahtinen =

Finnish ice hockey player (1938–2018)

Juhani Heikki Kalevi Lahtinen (28 September 1938 – 8 March 2018) was a Finnish ice hockey player. He was one of Finland's best ice hockey goaltenders. He played for the famous team Ilves in 1964.
