= František Vaněk =

Czech ice hockey player (1931–2020)

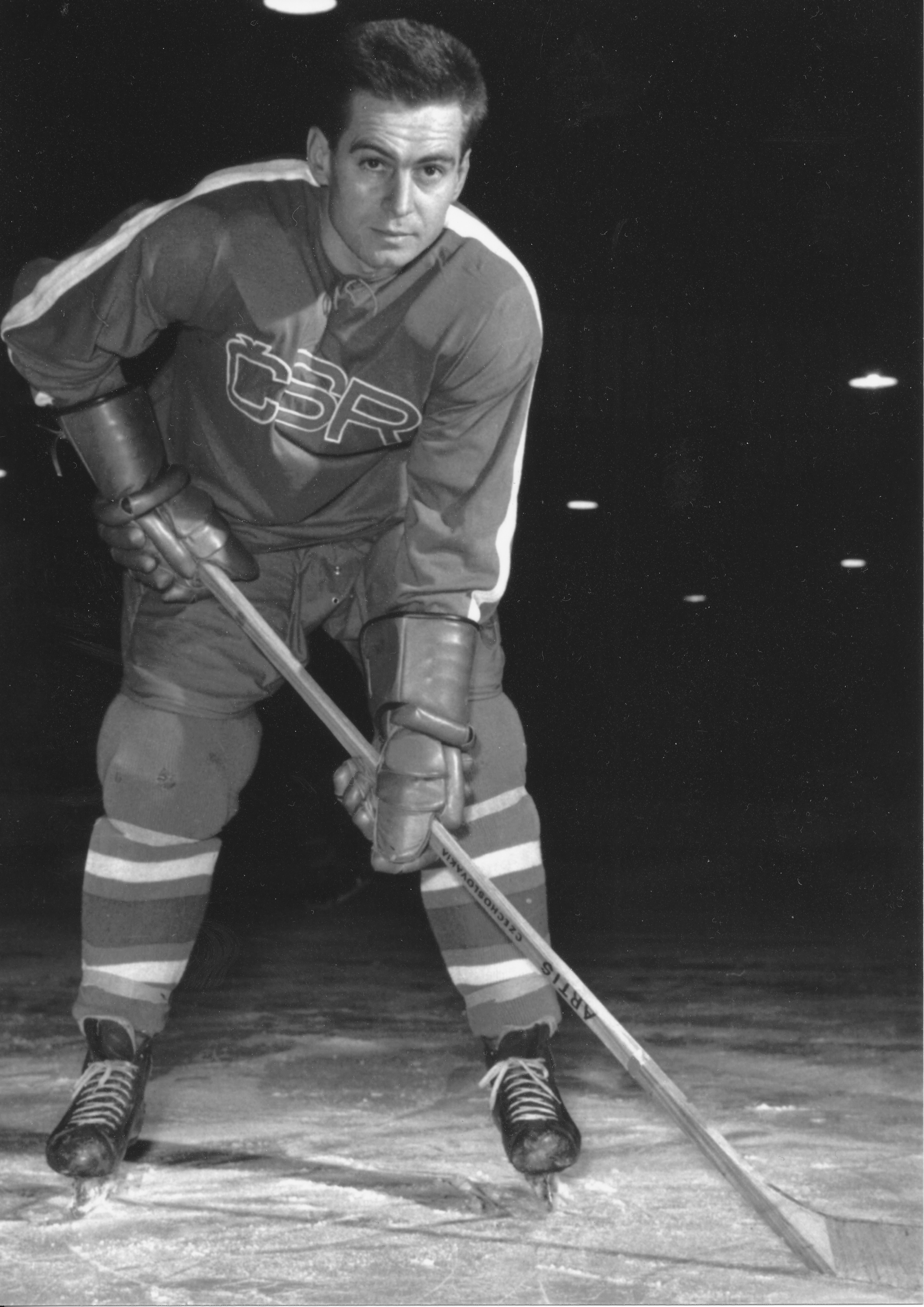
- Vaněk with the Czechoslovak national team
- Born: 3 December 1931 Uherský Ostroh, Czechoslovakia
- Died: 3 September 2020 (aged 88)
- Height: 5 ft 9 in (175 cm)
- Weight: 154 lb (70 kg; 11 st 0 lb)
- Position: Centre
- Shot: Left
- Played for: SK Královo Pole; TJ Brno
- National team: Czechoslovakia
- Playing career: 1951–1967

František Vaněk (3 December 1931 – 2 September 2020) was a Czech ice hockey player who competed in the 1956 Winter Olympics and in the 1960 Winter Olympics.

Vaněk was born in Uherský Ostroh, Czechoslovakia. He died on 2 September 2020, aged 88.
