= Toshihiko Yamada =

Japanese ice hockey player

Personal information
- Nationality: Japanese
- Born: 16 April 1932 (age 92)

Sport
- Sport: Ice hockey

Toshihiko Yamada (山田 敏彦, Yamada Toshihiko, born 16 April 1932) is a Japanese ice hockey player. He competed in the men's tournament at the 1960 Winter Olympics.
