= Shoichi Tomita =

Japanese ice hockey player

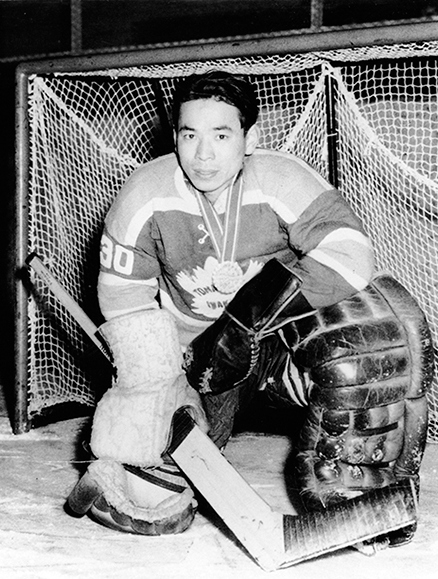
- Born: January 1, 1936 (age 90) Tokyo, Japan
- Height: 170 cm (5 ft 7 in)
- Position: Goaltender
- Played for: Iwakura Group

Shoichi Tomita (富田 正一, Tomita Shōichi; born January 1, 1936) is a retired Japanese ice hockey goaltender who competed at the 1960 Winter Olympics and 1962 World Ice Hockey Championships.

After retiring from competitions, Tomita worked at the Japan Ice Hockey Federation, first as management director and then as executive director. In parallel, for 27 years he was a TV commentator for NHK. He was also a member of the Japanese Olympic Committee. In 1978 he joined the International Ice Hockey Federation (IIHF), and served as its vice-president from 1994 to 2012.

Tomita was inducted into the IIHF Hall of Fame in 2006.
