= Masao Murano =

Japanese ice hockey player

Personal information
- Nationality: Japanese
- Born: 31 July 1935 (age 89)

Sport
- Sport: Ice hockey

Masao Murano (村野 正夫, Murano Masao, born 31 July 1935) is a Japanese ice hockey player. He competed in the men's tournament at the 1960 Winter Olympics.
