= Esko Luostarinen =

Finnish ice hockey player

Esko Alpo Luostarinen (born May 8, 1935, in Viipuri, Finland) is a retired professional ice hockey player who played in the SM-liiga. He played for Tappara and at two Olympic games. He competed at the 1960 Winter Olympics and the 1964 Winter Olympics.

He was inducted into the Finnish Hockey Hall of Fame in 1985.
