= Takashi Kakihara =

Japanese ice hockey player

Personal information
- Nationality: Japanese
- Born: 15 September 1937 (age 87)

Sport
- Sport: Ice hockey

Takashi Kakihara (垣原 隆司, Kakihara Takashi, born 15 September 1937) is a Japanese ice hockey player. He competed in the men's tournament at the 1960 Winter Olympics.
