= Miroslav Vlach =

Czech ice hockey player

Medal record

Representing Czechoslovakia

Men's Ice Hockey
Bronze medal – third place	1964 Innsbruck	Team

Miroslav Vlach (19 October 1935 in Český Těšín – 8 December 2001 in Ostrava) was a Czech ice hockey player who played for the Czechoslovak national team. He won a bronze medal at the 1964 Winter Olympics.
