= Václav Pantůček =

Czech ice hockey player

Václav Pantůček ({24 November 1934 in Mikulov – 21 July 1994 in Brno) was a Czech ice hockey player who competed for Czechoslovakia in the 1956 Winter Olympics and in the 1960 Winter Olympics.
