= Mamoru Takashima =

Japanese ice hockey player

Personal information
- Nationality: Japanese
- Born: 3 March 1938 (age 87) Hokkaido, Japan

Sport
- Sport: Ice hockey

Mamoru Takashima (高島 守, Takashima Mamoru; born 3 March 1938) is a Japanese ice hockey player. He competed in the men's tournaments at the 1960 Winter Olympics, the 1964 Winter Olympics and the 1968 Winter Olympics.
