= Joji Iwaoka =

Japanese ice hockey player (born 1933)

Personal information
- Nationality: Japanese
- Born: 28 September 1933 (age 91); Aomori, Japan

Sport
- Sport: Ice hockey

Joji Iwaoka (岩岡 譲二, Iwaoka Jōji, born 28 September 1933) is a Japanese ice hockey player. He competed in the men's tournament at the 1960 Winter Olympics.
