= Ján Starší =

Slovak ice hockey player and coach (1933–2019)

Ján Starší (17 October 1933 – 13 April 2019) was a Slovak ice hockey player and coach.

Born 17 October 1933 in Sokolče, Czechoslovakia, Starší competed in the 1960 Winter Olympics. He was inducted into the IIHF Hall of Fame in 1999, and died on 13 April 2019.
