= Hidenori Inatsu =

Japanese ice hockey player

Personal information
- Nationality: Japanese
- Born: 5 June 1938 (age 88)

Sport
- Sport: Ice hockey

Hidenori Inatsu (稲津 秀則, Inatsu Hidenori; born 5 June 1938) is a Japanese ice hockey player. He competed in the men's tournaments at the 1960 Winter Olympics and the 1964 Winter Olympics.
