= Vlastimil Bubník =

Czech ice hockey player and footballer

Personal information
- Date of birth: 18 March 1931
- Place of birth: Kelč, Czechoslovakia
- Date of death: 6 January 2015 (aged 83)
- Place of death: Brno, Czech Republic
- Position: Forward

Senior career*
Years	Team	Apps	(Gls)
1943–1953	SK Královo Pole		
1953–1962	Rudá Hvězda Brno	69	(26)
1962–1967	Spartak ZJŠ Brno	34	(6)
Total		103	(32)

International career
1957–1960	Czechoslovakia	11	(4)
- * Club domestic league appearances and goals

Olympic medal record

Men's ice hockey
Bronze medal – third place	1964 Innsbruck	Team

Vlastimil Bubník (Czech pronunciation: [ˈvlascɪmɪl ˈbubɲiːk]; 18 March 1931 – 6 January 2015) was a Czech ice hockey player and footballer.

Bubník was born in Kelč, Czechoslovakia, and played in the Czechoslovak Extraliga. He played for HC Brno and Královo Pole. He also won a bronze medal at the 1964 Winter Olympics. He was inducted into the International Ice Hockey Federation Hall of Fame in 1997.

He was tied with Canada's Harry Watson and Soviet Union's Valeri Kharlamov for the all-time Olympic scoring lead, until he was surpassed by Finland's Teemu Selänne in the 2010 Winter Olympics

During his football career he played for RH Brno. Over nine seasons in the Czechoslovak First League, he made 103 appearances, scoring 32 goals. He also scored 40 goals in five seasons in the second level. He earned 11 caps and scored 4 goals for the Czechoslovakia national football team from 1957 to 1960, and participated in the 1960 European Nations' Cup, scoring in the third place playoff match, in which Czechoslovakia beat France 2–0. He died in 2015.
