= Atsuo Irie =

Japanese ice hockey player

Personal information
- Nationality: Japanese
- Born: 31 October 1937 (age 87); Nikko, Tochigi, Japan

Sport
- Sport: Ice hockey

Atsuo Irie (入江 淳夫, Irie Atsuo, born 31 October 1937) is a Japanese ice hockey player. He competed in the men's tournaments at the 1960 Winter Olympics and the 1964 Winter Olympics.
