= Vladimír Dvořáček =

Czech ice hockey player

Vladimír Dvořáček (29 October 1934 in Pardubice – 1 December 1983) was a Czech ice hockey player who competed in the 1960 Winter Olympics.
