= Noel Derrick =

Australian ice hockey player (1926–2018)

Noel Derrick (5 July 1926 – 25 December 2018) was an Australian ice hockey player who competed in the 1960 Winter Olympics.
