= Josef Černý =

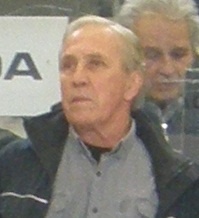
- Černý in 2011
- Born: 18 October 1939; Rožmitál pod Třemšínem, Protectorate of Bohemia and Moravia
- Died: 24 July 2025 (aged 85)
- Height: 5 ft 8 in (173 cm)
- Weight: 165 lb (75 kg; 11 st 11 lb)
- Position: Left wing
- Shot: Left
- Played for: HC Plzeň; Kometa Brno; EC Graz
- National team: Czechoslovakia
- Playing career: 1957–1979

Olympic medal record

Men's Ice hockey

Representing Czechoslovakia
Bronze medal – third place	1964 Innsbruck	Ice hockey
Silver medal – second place	1968 Grenoble	Ice hockey
Bronze medal – third place	1972 Sapporo	Ice hockey

Josef Černý (18 October 1939 – 24 July 2025) was an ice hockey player who played in the Czechoslovak Extraliga. He won three medals at four Winter Olympics. He was inducted into the IIHF Hall of Fame in 2007.

Černý died on 24 July 2025, at the age of 85.
