= Rudolf Potsch =

Czech ice hockey player (born 1937)

Medal record

Representing (Czechoslovakia)

Men's Ice Hockey
Bronze medal – third place	1964 Innsbruck	Team

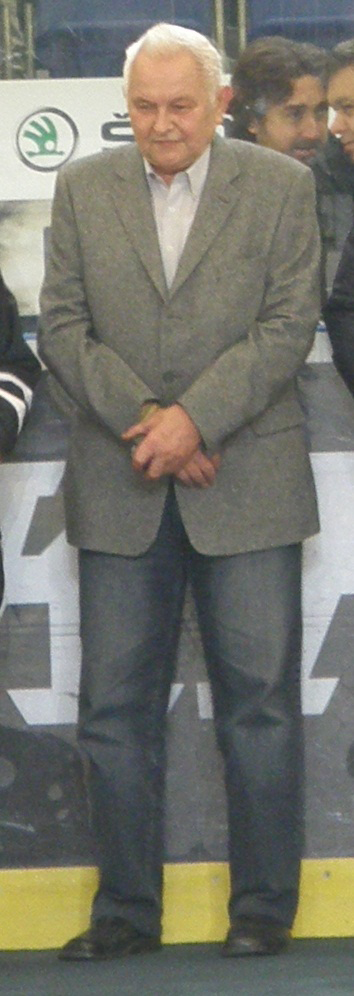
Rudolf Potsch

Rudolf Potsch (born 15 June 1937 in Brno, Czechoslovakia) is an ice hockey player who played for the Czechoslovak national team. He won a bronze medal at the 1964 Winter Olympics.
