= Isao Ono (ice hockey) =

Japanese ice hockey player

Personal information
- Nationality: Japanese
- Born: 5 August 1933 (age 91); Hokkaido, Japan

Sport
- Sport: Ice hockey

Isao Ono (小野 悳, Ono Isao, born 5 August 1933) is a Japanese ice hockey player. He competed in the men's tournaments at the 1960 Winter Olympics and the 1964 Winter Olympics.
