= Shinichi Honma =

Japanese ice hockey player

Personal information
- Nationality: Japanese
- Born: 3 November 1934 (age 91) Hokkaido, Japan

Sport
- Sport: Ice hockey

Shinichi Honma (本間 信一, Honma Shin'ichi; born 3 November 1934) is a Japanese ice hockey player. He competed in the men's tournaments at the 1960 Winter Olympics and the 1964 Winter Olympics.
