= Vladimír Nadrchal =

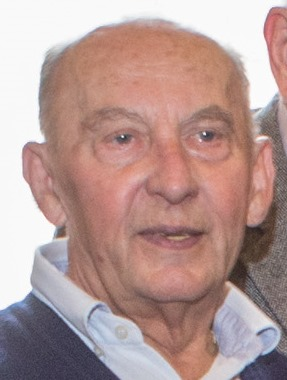
- Nadrchal in 2017
- Born: 4 March 1938 (age 88) Pardubice, Czechoslovakia
Medal record
Representing Czechoslovakia
Men's Ice Hockey
Bronze medal – third place	1964 Innsbruck	Team
Silver medal – second place	1968 Grenoble	Team

Vladimír Nadrchal (born 4 March 1938) is an ice hockey player who played for the Czechoslovak national team. He won a bronze medal at the 1964 Winter Olympics, and a silver medal at the 1968 Winter Olympics.
