= Jan Kasper =

Czechoslovak ice hockey player

Jan Kasper (21 September 1932 in Soběšovice – 4 March 2005 in Ostrava) was a Czech ice hockey player who competed in the 1956 Winter Olympics and in the 1960 Winter Olympics.
