= Toshiei Honma =

Japanese ice hockey player

Personal information
- Nationality: Japanese
- Born: 12 December 1935 (age 89); Hokkaido, Japan

Sport
- Sport: Ice hockey

Toshiei Honma (本間 敏栄, Honma Toshiei, born 12 December 1935) is a Japanese ice hockey player. He competed in the men's tournaments at the 1960 Winter Olympics and the 1964 Winter Olympics.
