= Bob Cleary =

American ice hockey player

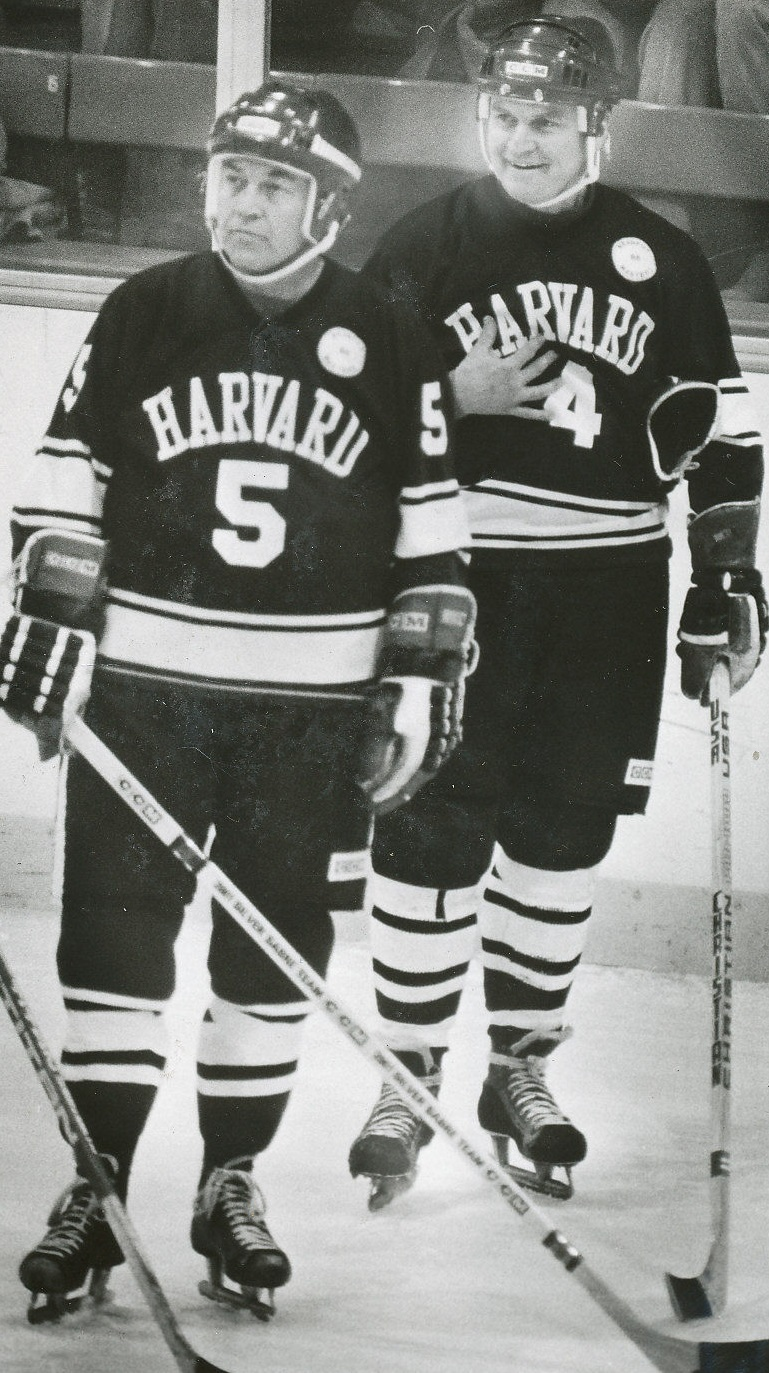
- Bob and Bill Cleary
- Born: April 21, 1936 Cambridge, Massachusetts, U.S.
- Died: September 16, 2015 (aged 79) Hyannis, Massachusetts, U.S.
- National team: United States
- Playing career: 1951–1960
Medal record
Men's ice hockey
Representing the United States
Olympic Games
Gold medal – first place	1960 Squaw Valley	Team competition

Robert Barry Cleary (April 21, 1936 – September 16, 2015) was an American ice hockey player. Cleary was a member of the American 1960 Winter Olympics team that won the gold medal, teaming up as he did at Harvard with his brother Bill. Bob was inducted into the United States Hockey Hall of Fame in 1981.

While at Harvard, the Cleary brothers played collegiate summer baseball together for the now defunct Sagamore Clouters of the Cape Cod Baseball League.

== Awards and honors ==
Award	Year
AHCA Second Team All-American	1956–57
AHCA East All-American	1957–58

Awards and achievements
Preceded by Ed Rowe	NCAA Ice Hockey Scoring Champion; 1956–57 (with Bill Hay)	Succeeded by Bill Hay
