= Soviet Union at the 1960 Winter Olympics =

- Flag of the Soviet Union
- IOC code: URS
- NOC: Soviet Olympic Committee

in Squaw Valley
- Competitors: 62 (49 men, 13 women) in 8 sports
- Flag bearer: Nikolai Sologubov
- Medals Ranked 1st: Gold 7 Silver 5 Bronze 9 Total 21

Winter Olympics appearances (overview)
- 1956; 1960; 1964; 1968; 1972; 1976; 1980; 1984; 1988

Other related appearances
- Latvia (1924–1936, 1992–pres.); Estonia (1928–1936, 1992–pres.); Lithuania (1928, 1992–pres.); Unified Team (1992); Armenia (1994–pres.); Belarus (1994–2022); Georgia (1994–pres.); Kazakhstan (1994–pres.); Kyrgyzstan (1994–pres.); Moldova (1994–pres.); Russia (1994–2014); Ukraine (1994–pres.); Uzbekistan (1994–pres.); Azerbaijan (1998–pres.); Tajikistan (2002–pres.); Olympic Athletes from Russia (2018); ROC (2022); Individual Neutral Athletes (2026)

The Soviet Union (USSR) competed at the 1960 Winter Olympics in Squaw Valley, United States.

== Medalists ==
Medal	Name	Sport	Event
Gold	Maria Gusakova	Cross-country skiing	Women's 10 km
Gold	Yevgeny Grishin	Speed skating	Men's 500 m
Gold	Yevgeny Grishin	Speed skating	Men's 1500 m
Gold	Viktor Kosichkin	Speed skating	Men's 5000 m
Gold	Klara Nesterova-Guseva	Speed skating	Women's 1000 m
Gold	Lidiya Skoblikova	Speed skating	Women's 1500 m
Gold	Lidiya Skoblikova	Speed skating	Women's 3000 m
Silver	Lyubov Baranova	Cross-country skiing	Women's 10 km
Silver	Radya Yeroshina; Maria Gusakova; Lyubov Baranova	Cross-country skiing	Women's 3 x 5 km relay
Silver	Viktor Kosichkin	Speed skating	Men's 10000 m
Silver	Natalya Donchenko	Speed skating	Women's 500 m
Silver	Valentina Stenina	Speed skating	Women's 3000 m
Bronze	Aleksandr Privalov	Biathlon	Men's 20 km
Bronze	Nikolay Anikin	Cross-country skiing	Men's 30 km
Bronze	Anatoly Shelyukhin; Gennady Vaganov; Aleksey Kuznetsov; Nikolay Anikin	Cross-country skiing	Men's 4 × 10 km relay
Bronze	Radya Yeroshina	Cross-country skiing	Women's 10 km
Bronze	Soviet Union men's national ice hockey team: Nikolai Puchkov; Yevgeni Yorkin; Nikolai Sologubov; Yury Baulin; Nikolay Karpov; Genrikh Sidorenkov; Alfred Kuchevsky; Veniamin Alexandrov; Aleksandr Almetov; Konstantin Loktev; Mikhail Bychkov; Vladimir Grebennikov; Yury Tsitsinov; Viktor Yakushev; Yevgeny Groshev; Stanislav Petukhov; Viktor Pryazhnikov	Ice hockey	Men's competition
Bronze	Nikolay Gusakov	Nordic combined	Men's individual (15 km)
Bronze	Rafael Grach	Speed skating	Men's 500 m
Bronze	Boris Stenin	Speed skating	Men's 1500 m
Bronze	Tamara Rylova	Speed skating	Women's 1000 m

== Alpine skiing ==
Women

Athlete	Event	Final			
Athlete	Event	Run 1	Run 2	Total	Rank
Stalina Korzukhina	Downhill			1:46.5	19
Stalina Korzukhina	Giant slalom			1:45.7	21
Stalina Korzukhina	Slalom	58.5	59.9	1:58.4	7
Yevgeniya Kabina	Downhill			1:46.7	20
Yevgeniya Kabina	Giant slalom			1:50.0	31
Yevgeniya Kabina	Slalom	1:03.3	1:01.0	2:04.3	18
Lyubov Volkova	Downhill			1:49.2	23
Lyubov Volkova	Giant slalom			1:48.9	30
Lyubov Volkova	Slalom	1:00.8	1:16.5	2:17.3	30

== Biathlon ==
Men

Athlete	Event	Final		
Athlete	Event	Time	Misses	Rank
Aleksandr Privalov	20 km	1:34:54.2	3	3rd place, bronze medalist(s)
Vladimir Melanin	20 km	1:35:42.4	4	4
Valentin Pshenitsyn	20 km	1:36:45.8	3	5
Dmitry Sokolov	20 km	1:38:16.7	5	6

== Cross-country skiing ==
Men

Athlete	Event	Final	
Athlete	Event	Total	Rank
Nikolay Anikin	15 km	52:55.0	10
Nikolay Anikin	30 km	1:52:28.2	3rd place, bronze medalist(s)
Nikolay Anikin	50 km	3:10:13.9	13
Aleksandr Gubin	15 km	53:29.1	15
Aleksey Kuznetsov	30 km	1:54:23.9	8
Aleksey Kuznetsov	50 km	3-11:47.0	15
Ivan Lyubimov	50 km	3:25:06.4	18
Pavel Morshchinin	15 km	53:36.6	16
Anatoly Shelyukhin	30 km	1:58:21.3	15
Gennady Vaganov	15 km	52:18.0	4
Gennady Vaganov	30 km	1:52:49.2	4
Gennady Vaganov	50 km	3:05:27.6	7
Anatoly Shelyukhin; Gennady Vaganov; Aleksey Kuznetsov; Nikolay Anikin	Relay 4 x 10 km	2:21:21.6	3rd place, bronze medalist(s)

Women

Athlete	Event	Final	
Athlete	Event	Total	Rank
Lyubov Baranova	10 km	40:04.2	2nd place, silver medalist(s)
Maria Gusakova	10 km	39:46.6	1st place, gold medalist(s)
Alevtina Kolchina	10 km	40:12.6	4
Radya Yeroshina	10 km	40:06.0	3rd place, bronze medalist(s)
Radya Yeroshina; Maria Gusakova; Lyubov Baranova	Relay 3 x 5 km	1:05:02.6	2nd place, silver medalist(s)

== Figure skating ==
Athlete	Event	Points	Places	Rank
Nina Zhuk; Stanislav Zhuk	Pairs	72.3	38.6	6
Ludmila Belousova; Oleg Protopopov	Pairs	68.6	60.5	9

== Ice hockey ==
Men

- Head coach: (Soviet Union) Anatoli Tarasov

Pos.	No.	Player	Team
GK		Nikolai Puchkov
GK		Yevgeni Yorkin
D		Nikolai Sologubov
D		Yury Baulin
D		Nikolay Karpov
D		Genrikh Sidorenkov
D		Alfred Kuchevsky
F		Veniamin Alexandrov
F		Aleksandr Almetov
F		Konstantin Loktev
F		Mikhail Bychkov
F		Vladimir Grebennikov
F		Yury Tsitsinov
F		Viktor Yakushev
F		Yevgeny Groshev
F		Stanislav Petukhov
F		Viktor Pryazhnikov

Preliminary round

Team	GP	W	L	T	GF	GA	PTS
Soviet Union	2	2	0	0	16	4	4
Germany	2	1	1	0	4	9	2
Finland	2	0	2	0	5	12	0

19 February 1960	Soviet Union	8–0 (3–0, 3–0, 2–0)	Germany

Yevgeni Yorkin
Goalies
Michael Hobelsberger
Referees:
Marsh Ryman
Everett Riley

Baulin (Alexandrov) – 1:32	1–0
Pryazhnikov (Petukhov) – 4:01	2–0
Alexandrov – 18:44	3–0
Petukhov (Sologubov) – 22:44	4–0
Groshev (Yakushev) – 31:53	5–0
Almetov (Alexandrov) – 38:16	6–0
Sologubov (Tsitsinov) – 45:19	7–0
Loktev (Alexandrov, Kuchevsky) – 49:06	8–0

16 min
Penalties
20 min
32
Shots
18

20 February 1960	Soviet Union	8–4 (2–1, 4–0, 2–3)	Finland

Nikolai Puchkov
Yevgeni Yorkin
Goalies
Esko Niemi
Referees:
Bill MacKenzie
Hugh McLean

Grebennikov (Petukhov, Tsitsinov) – 4:43	1–0
Groshev (Yakushev, Karpov) (PP) – 9:35	2–0
	2–1	18:09 – Lampainen (PP2)
Karpov – 22:36	3–1
Yakushev (Petukhov) – 29:36	4–1
Tsitsinov (Grebennikov, Karpov) – 36:21	5–1
Groshev (Petukhov) – 37:30	6–1
	6–2	43:20 – Pulli
Loktev (Alexandrov) – 44:31	7–2
	7–3	47:15 – Nieminen (Pulli)
Grebennikov (Tsitsinov) (PP) – 56:28	8–3
	8–4	59:42 – Nieminen

26 min
Penalties
8 min
41
Shots
36

Final round

Team	GP	W	L	T	GF	GA	PTS
United States	5	5	0	0	29	11	10
Canada	5	4	1	0	31	12	8
Soviet Union	5	2	2	1	24	19	5
Czechoslovakia	5	2	3	0	21	23	4
Sweden	5	1	3	1	19	19	3
Germany	5	0	5	0	5	45	0

22 February 1960; 13:00	Soviet Union	8–5 (3–2, 2–1, 3–2)	Czechoslovakia

Nikolai Puchkov
Goalies
Vladimír Nadrchal
Vladimír Dvořáček

Tsitsinov (Bychkov, Sologubov) (PP) – 7:33	1–0
	1–1	14:17 – Bubník
Loktev (Almetov, Alexandrov) – 15:56	2–1
Alexandrov – 18:26	3–1
	3–2	19:44 – Černý
Tsitsinov (Grebennikov) – 25:38	4–2
Loktev (Almetov, Sologubov) – 30:31	5–2
	5–3	35:01 – Pantůček (Potsch, Bubník) (PP)
Alexandrov (Almetov, Loktev) – 41:08	6–3
Petukhov (Yakushev) – 44:28	7–3
	7–4	45:03 – Pantůček (Bubník, Bronislav Danda)
	7–5	50:13 – Pantůček (Bronislav Danda)
Loktev (Grebennikov, Groshev) – 53:09	8–5

14 min
Penalties
8 min
43
Shots
37

24 February 1960; 15:30	Soviet Union	2–2 (0–0, 0–0, 2–2)	Sweden

Nikolai Puchkov
Goalies
Kjell Svensson

	0–1	42:30 – Nilsson (Lundvall)
Loktev (Groshev, Sologubov) (PP) – 48:07	1–1
Alexandrov (Sologubov) – 51:49	2–1
	2–2	58:32 – Nilsson (Lundvall, Pettersson)

4 min
Penalties
4 min
34
Shots
28

25 February 1960; 13:00	Soviet Union	7–1 (0–1, 4–0, 3–0)	Germany

Yevgeni Yorkin
Goalies
Michael Hobelsberger
Referees:
Barry Riley
Bill Riley

	0–1	3:17 – Huber
Grebennikov (Tsitsinov) – 27:47	1–1
Tsitsinov (Baulin) – 31:33	2–1
Alexandrov (Kuchevsky, Yakushev) – 33:40	3–1
Petukhov (Kuchevsky) – 34:42	4–1
Tsitsinov (Bychkov) (PP) – 50:41	5–1
Petukhov (Sidorenkov) – 53:24	6–1
Sidorenkov (PP2) – 59:16	7–1

6 min
Penalties
10 min
37
Shots
13

27 February 1960; 13:30	United States	3–2 (1–2, 1–0, 1–0)	Soviet Union

Jack McCartan
Goalies
Nikolai Puchkov
Referees:
Kurt Hauser
Richard Wagner

Bill Cleary (Bob Cleary) – 4:04	1–0
	1–1	5:03 – Alexandrov (Sologubov)
	1–2	9:37 – Bychkov (Grebennikov)
B. Christian (R. Christian) – 31:01	2–2
B. Christian (Williams, R. Christian) – 54:59	3–2

4 min
Penalties
6 min
34
Shots
29

28 February 1960	Canada	8–5 (3–0, 1–3, 4–2)	Soviet Union

Harold Hurley
Don Head
Goalies
Nikolai Puchkov
Referees:
Kurt Hauser
Richard Wagner

Etcher (Attersley) – 7:32	1–0
Sinden (Attersley, Etcher) – 18:12	2–0
Samolenko (Attersley, Sinden) – 18:27	3–0
Rope (Rousseau) – 22:37	4–0
	4–1	25:28 – Almetov (Alexandrov) (PP)
	4–2	25:51 – Alexandrov (Sologubov, Loktev) (PP)
	4–3	29:56 – Grebennikov (Bychkov, Sologubov)
Etcher (Attersley) – 45:33	5–3
Connelly – 46:48	6–3
Martin Connelly, Laufman – 47:53	7–3
	7–4	50:16 – Groshev (Sidorenkov) (PP)
	7–5	55:02 – Pryazhnikov (Groshev, Baulin)
Attersley (Etcher) – 59:52	8–5

12 min
Penalties
6 min
47
Shots
33

Bronze

== Nordic combined ==
Athlete	Event	Ski jumping		Cross-country			Total	
Athlete	Event	Points	Rank	Time	Points	Rank	Points	Rank
Leonid Fyodorov	Individual 15 km	202.0	17	1:02:13.1	225.548	15	427.548	16
Nikolay Gusakov	Individual 15 km	212.0	10	58:29.4	240.000	1	452.000	3rd place, bronze medalist(s)
Dmitry Kochkin	Individual 15 km	219.5	2	1:01:32.1	228.194	11	447.694	5
Mikhail Pryakin	Individual 15 km	200.5	21	1:00:25.7	232.452	9	432.952	12

== Ski jumping ==
Athlete	Event	First round		Final		
Athlete	Event	Points	Rank	Points	Total	Rank
Leonid Fyodorov	Normal hill	97.2	26	95.9	193.1	27
Nikolay Kamenskiy	Normal hill	110.2	3	106.7	216.9	4
Nikolay Shamov	Normal hill	103.2	15	107.4	210.6	10
Koba Zakadze	Normal hill	107.0	7	104.1	211.1	9

== Speed skating ==
Men

Event	Athlete	Race	
Event	Athlete	Time	Rank
500 m	Yury Malyshev	41.2	10
500 m	Gennady Voronin	40.7	5
500 m	Rafael Grach	40.4	3rd place, bronze medalist(s)
500 m	Yevgeny Grishin	40.2 OR	1st place, gold medalist(s)
1500 m	Lev Zaytsev	2:22.1	31
1500 m	Gennady Voronin	2:14.7	12
1500 m	Boris Stenin	2:11.5	3rd place, bronze medalist(s)
1500 m	Yevgeny Grishin	2:10.4	1st place, gold medalist(s)
5000 m	Oleg Goncharenko	8:06.6	6
5000 m	Valery Kotov	8:05.4	5
5000 m	Viktor Kosichkin	7:51.3	1st place, gold medalist(s)
10000 m	Nikolajs Štelbaums	DSQ	–
10000 m	Vladimir Shilykovsky	17:13.9	20
10000 m	Viktor Kosichkin	15:49.2	2nd place, silver medalist(s)

Women

Event	Athlete	Race	
Event	Athlete	Time	Rank
500 m	Klara Nesterova-Guseva	46.8	6
500 m	Tamara Rylova	46.2	4
500 m	Natalya Donchenko	46.0	2nd place, silver medalist(s)
1000 m	Lidiya Skoblikova	1:35.3	4
1000 m	Tamara Rylova	1:34.8	3rd place, bronze medalist(s)
1000 m	Klara Nesterova-Guseva	1:34.1	1st place, gold medalist(s)
1500 m	Valentina Stenina	2:29.2	5
1500 m	Klara Nesterova-Guseva	2:28.7	4
1500 m	Lidiya Skoblikova	2:25.2	1st place, gold medalist(s)
3000 m	Tamara Rylova	5:30.0	9
3000 m	Valentina Stenina	5:16.9	2nd place, silver medalist(s)
3000 m	Lidiya Skoblikova	5:14.3	1st place, gold medalist(s)

== Medals by republic ==
In the following table for team events number of team representatives, who received medals are counted, not "one medal for all the team", as usual. Because there were people from different republics in one team.

Rank	Nation	Gold	Silver	Bronze	Total
1	Russian SFSR	7	6	27	40
2	Byelorussian SSR	0	1	0	1
3	Ukrainian SSR	0	0	1	1
Totals (3 entries)		7	7	28	42
