= Ice hockey at the 1960 Winter Olympics – Rosters =

The ice hockey team rosters at the 1960 Winter Olympics consisted of the following players:

== Australia ==
Head coach: (Canada) Bud McEachern

No.	Pos.	Name	Height	Weight	Birthdate	Team
1	G	Robert Reid	-	-	December 21, 1932 (aged 27)	N/A
2	D	John Nicholas	-	-	May 2, 1930 (aged 29)	N/A
3	D	Vic Ekberg	-	-	June 16, 1932 (aged 27)	N/A
4	C/D	Ronald Amess	-	-	August 9, 1927 (aged 32)	N/A
5	F	Dave Cunningham	-	-	October 19, 1928 (aged 31)	N/A
6	F	Noel Derrick	-	-	July 5, 1926 (aged 33)	N/A
7	F	Ken Pawsey	-	-	December 13, 1940 (aged 19)	N/A
8	F	Ben Acton (C)	-	-	December 2, 1927 (aged 32)	N/A
9	F	Ivo Vesely	-	-	April 1, 1926 (aged 33)	N/A
10	D	Basil Hansen	-	-	July 10, 1926 (aged 33)	N/A
11	D	Ken Wellman (A)	-	-	June 2, 1930 (aged 29)	N/A
12	F	John Thomas	-	-	March 11, 1936 (aged 23)	N/A
14	F	Clive Hitch	-	-	May 17, 1931 (aged 28)	N/A
15	F	Russell Jones	-	-	September 1, 1926 (aged 33)	(Australia) Demons Ice Hockey Club
16	F	Peter Parrott	-	-	May 27, 1936 (aged 23)	N/A
18	G	Noel McLoughlin	-	-	September 15, 1929 (aged 30)	N/A
19	F	Zdeněk Tikal	-	-	June 15, 1929 (aged 30)	N/A

== Canada ==
Head coach: Bobby Bauer

No.	Pos.	Name	Height	Weight	Birthdate	Team
1	G	Don Head	5 ft 10 in (178 cm)	201 lb (91 kg)	June 30, 1933 (aged 26)	(Canada) Windsor Bulldogs
1	G	Harold Hurley	-	-	November 16, 1929 (aged 30)	(Canada) Kitchener-Waterloo Dutchmen
2	D	Harry Sinden (C)	5 ft 10 in (178 cm)	181 lb (82 kg)	September 24, 1932 (aged 27)	(Canada) Whitby Dunlops
4	D	Darryl Sly	5 ft 10 in (178 cm)	185 lb (84 kg)	April 3, 1939 (aged 20)	(Canada) Kitchener-Waterloo Dutchmen
5	D	Jack Douglas	5 ft 11 in (180 cm)	190 lb (86 kg)	April 24, 1930 (aged 29)	(United States) Fairfield Stags
6	D	Maurice Benoît	5 ft 11 in (180 cm)	181 lb (82 kg)	July 26, 1933 (aged 26)	(Canada) Belleville McFarlands
7	C	Bob Attersley	5 ft 10 in (178 cm)	165 lb (75 kg)	August 13, 1933 (aged 26)	(Canada) Hull-Ottawa Canadiens
8	F	Cliff Pennington	6 ft 0 in (183 cm)	174 lb (79 kg)	April 18, 1940 (aged 19)	(Canada) Kitchener-Waterloo Dutchmen
9	F	Robert Forhan	-	-	March 27, 1936 (aged 23)	(Canada) Kitchener-Waterloo Dutchmen
10	F	George Samolenko	-	-	December 20, 1930 (aged 29)	N/A
12	F	Bob McKnight	-	-	March 19, 1938 (aged 21)	N/A
14	F	Fred Etcher	-	-	August 23, 1932 (aged 27)	N/A
15	F	Floyd Martin	5 ft 10 in (178 cm)	209 lb (95 kg)	June 26, 1929 (aged 30)	(Canada) Kitchener-Waterloo Dutchmen
16	D	Donald Rope	5 ft 10 in (178 cm)	154 lb (70 kg)	February 2, 1929 (aged 31)	(Canada) Kitchener-Waterloo Dutchmen
17	F	Ken Laufman	5 ft 9 in (175 cm)	159 lb (72 kg)	May 27, 1936 (aged 23)	(Canada) Kitchener-Waterloo Dutchmen
18	F	Jim Connelly	-	-	October 7, 1932 (aged 27)	N/A
20	F	Bobby Rousseau	5 ft 10 in (178 cm)	179 lb (81 kg)	July 26, 1940 (aged 19)	(Canada) Hull-Ottawa Canadiens

== Czechoslovakia ==
Head coach: Eduard Farda

Assistant coach: Ladislav Horský

No.	Pos.	Name	Height	Weight	Birthdate	Team
1	G	Vladimír Dvořáček	-	-	October 29, 1934 (aged 25)	(Czechoslovakia) DSO Dynamo Pardubice
2	D	Karel Gut (C)	-	-	September 16, 1927 (aged 32)	(Czechoslovakia) TJ Spartak Praha Sokolovo
3	D	František Tikal	5 ft 11 in (180 cm)	181 lb (82 kg)	July 18, 1933 (aged 26)	(Czechoslovakia) TJ Spartak Praha Sokolovo
4	D	Jan Kasper	5 ft 10 in (178 cm)	176 lb (80 kg)	September 21, 1932 (aged 27)	(Czechoslovakia) TJ Rudá Hvězda Brno
5	D	Rudolf Potsch	6 ft 2 in (188 cm)	209 lb (95 kg)	June 15, 1937 (aged 22)	(Czechoslovakia) TJ Rudá Hvězda Brno
6	F	Bronislav Danda	5 ft 8 in (173 cm)	165 lb (75 kg)	January 10, 1930 (aged 30)	(Czechoslovakia) TJ Rudá Hvězda Brno
7	F	Miroslav Vlach	5 ft 7 in (170 cm)	163 lb (74 kg)	October 19, 1935 (aged 24)	(Czechoslovakia) TJ VŽKG Ostrava
8	F	Ján Starší	5 ft 11 in (180 cm)	183 lb (83 kg)	October 17, 1933 (aged 26)	(Czechoslovakia) HC Slovan Bratislava
9	F	František Vaněk	5 ft 9 in (175 cm)	154 lb (70 kg)	December 3, 1931 (aged 28)	(Czechoslovakia) TJ Rudá Hvězda Brno
11	F	Josef Černý	5 ft 8 in (173 cm)	165 lb (75 kg)	October 18, 1939 (aged 20)	(Czechoslovakia) TJ Rudá Hvězda Brno
12	F	Vlastimil Bubník	5 ft 9 in (175 cm)	154 lb (70 kg)	March 18, 1931 (aged 28)	(Czechoslovakia) TJ Rudá Hvězda Brno
14	F	Jaroslav Volf	-	-	August 8, 1933 (aged 26)	(Czechoslovakia) TJ Kladno
15	F	Václav Pantůček	5 ft 10 in (178 cm)	168 lb (76 kg)	November 24, 1934 (aged 25)	(Czechoslovakia) TJ Rudá Hvězda Brno
16	F	Jaroslav Jiřík	5 ft 7 in (170 cm)	176 lb (80 kg)	December 10, 1939 (aged 20)	(Czechoslovakia) TJ Kladno
17	G	Vladimír Nadrchal	5 ft 8 in (173 cm)	159 lb (72 kg)	March 4, 1938 (aged 21)	(Czechoslovakia) TJ Rudá Hvězda Brno
19	F/D	Jozef Golonka	5 ft 9 in (175 cm)	165 lb (75 kg)	January 6, 1938 (aged 22)	(Czechoslovakia) HC Slovan Bratislava
20	D	František Mašlán	5 ft 9 in (175 cm)	154 lb (70 kg)	February 19, 1933 (aged 27)	(Czechoslovakia) TJ Rudá Hvězda Brno

== Finland ==
Head coach: (Canada) Joe Wirkkunen

Assistant coach: Aarne Honkavaara

No.	Pos.	Name	Height	Weight	Birthdate	Team
-	F	Yrjö Hakala (C)	5 ft 10 in (178 cm)	157 lb (71 kg)	April 20, 1932 (aged 27)	(Finland) Tappara
-	F	Raimo Kilpiö	5 ft 9 in (175 cm)	163 lb (74 kg)	February 2, 1936 (aged 24)	(Finland) Ilves
-	D	Erkki Koiso	5 ft 9 in (175 cm)	172 lb (78 kg)	February 13, 1934 (aged 26)	(Finland) Ilves
-	G	Juhani Lahtinen	5 ft 8 in (173 cm)	185 lb (84 kg)	September 28, 1938 (aged 21)	(Finland) Ilves
-	D	Matti Lampainen	-	-	January 16, 1932 (aged 28)	(Finland) Ilves
-	F	Esko Luostarinen	-	-	May 8, 1935 (aged 24)	(Finland) Tappara
-	G	Esko Niemi	5 ft 9 in (175 cm)	187 lb (85 kg)	June 11, 1934 (aged 25)	(Finland) Tappara
-	F	Pertti Nieminen	6 ft 0 in (183 cm)	183 lb (83 kg)	December 9, 1936 (aged 23)	(Finland) TPS
-	D	Kalevi Numminen	-	-	January 31, 1940 (aged 20)	(Finland) Tappara
-	F	Heino Pulli	-	-	May 22, 1938 (aged 21)	(Finland) TKV
-	F	Kalevi Rassa	-	-	February 3, 1936 (aged 24)	(Finland) Ilves
-	F	Teppo Rastio	-	-	February 15, 1934 (aged 26)	(Finland) Lukko
-	F	Jorma Salmi	5 ft 11 in (180 cm)	187 lb (85 kg)	May 6, 1933 (aged 26)	(Finland) Ilves
-	F	Jouni Seistamo	5 ft 7 in (170 cm)	152 lb (69 kg)	January 9, 1939 (aged 21)	(Finland) Tappara
-	F	Voitto Soini	-	-	February 6, 1938 (aged 22)	(Finland) TPS
-	F	Seppo Vainio	-	-	January 31, 1937 (aged 23)	(Finland) Lukko
-	F	Juhani Wahlsten	5 ft 9 in (175 cm)	181 lb (82 kg)	January 13, 1938 (aged 22)	(Finland) Ilves

== Germany ==
Head coach: Karl Wild

No.	Pos.	Name	Height	Weight	Birthdate	Team
-	D	Paul Ambros	5 ft 9 in (175 cm)	168 lb (76 kg)	June 22, 1933 (aged 26)	(Germany) EV Füssen
-	F	Georg Eberl	-	-	May 11, 1936 (aged 23)	(Germany) EC Bad Tölz
-	F	Markus Egen (C)	-	-	September 14, 1927 (aged 32)	(Germany) EV Füssen
-	D	Ernst Eggerbauer	-	-	April 16, 1932 (aged 27)	(Germany) EV Füssen
-	G	Michael Hobelsberger	5 ft 8 in (173 cm)	179 lb (81 kg)	September 25, 1935 (aged 24)	(Germany) SC Riessersee
-	F/D	Hans Huber	-	-	December 10, 1929 (aged 30)	(Germany) SC Riessersee
-	G	Ulli Jansen	5 ft 7 in (170 cm)	168 lb (76 kg)	June 5, 1931 (aged 28)	(Germany) Krefelder EV 1936
-	F	Hans Rampf	-	-	February 2, 1931 (aged 29)	(Germany) EC Bad Tölz
-	F	Sepp Reif	5 ft 11 in (180 cm)	187 lb (85 kg)	September 5, 1937 (aged 22)	(Germany) EC Bad Tölz
-	D	Otto Schneitberger	5 ft 7 in (170 cm)	161 lb (73 kg)	September 29, 1939 (aged 20)	(Germany) EC Bad Tölz
-	F	Siegfried Schubert	5 ft 8 in (173 cm)	163 lb (74 kg)	October 4, 1939 (aged 20)	(Germany) EV Füssen
-	F	Horst Schuldes	5 ft 9 in (175 cm)	168 lb (76 kg)	March 18, 1939 (aged 20)	(Germany) SC Riessersee
-	F	Kurt Sepp	-	-	September 14, 1935 (aged 24)	(Germany) Mannheimer ERC
-	F	Ernst Trautwein	-	-	April 8, 1936 (aged 23)	(Germany) EV Füssen
-	F	Xaver Unsinn	-	-	November 29, 1929 (aged 30)	(Germany) EV Füssen
-	D	Leonhard Waitl	5 ft 10 in (178 cm)	174 lb (79 kg)	April 5, 1939 (aged 20)	(Germany) EV Füssen

== Japan ==
Head coach: Hiroki Onikura

No.	Pos.	Name	Height	Weight	Birthdate	Team
-	F/D	Shikaski Akazawa	5 ft 11 in (180 cm)	170 lb (77 kg)	November 15, 1934 (aged 25)	(Japan) Furukawa
-	F	Shinichi Honma	5 ft 7 in (170 cm)	163 lb (74 kg)	November 3, 1934 (aged 25)	N/A
-	G	Toshiei Honma	6 ft 0 in (183 cm)	179 lb (81 kg)	December 12, 1935 (aged 24)	N/A
-	F	Hidenori Inatsu	5 ft 9 in (175 cm)	163 lb (74 kg)	June 5, 1938 (aged 21)	N/A
-	F	Atsuo Irie	5 ft 5 in (165 cm)	134 lb (61 kg)	October 31, 1937 (aged 22)	(Japan) Furukawa
-	F	Yuji Iwaoka	5 ft 8 in (173 cm)	143 lb (65 kg)	September 28, 1933 (aged 26)	(Japan) Furukawa
-	D	Takashi Kakihara	-	-	September 15, 1937 (aged 22)	(Japan) Iwakura Tomakomai
-	D	Yoshihiro Miyazaki (C)	5 ft 8 in (173 cm)	154 lb (70 kg)	May 10, 1930 (aged 29)	N/A
-	F	Masao Murano	5 ft 6 in (168 cm)	159 lb (72 kg)	July 31, 1935 (aged 24)	N/A
-	F	Isao Ono	5 ft 11 in (180 cm)	163 lb (74 kg)	August 5, 1933 (aged 26)	N/A
-	F	Akiyoshi Segawa	5 ft 7 in (170 cm)	159 lb (72 kg)	May 31, 1934 (aged 25)	N/A
-	D	Shigeru Shimada	5 ft 7 in (170 cm)	154 lb (70 kg)	October 16, 1935 (aged 24)	N/A
-	D	Kunito Takagi	5 ft 10 in (178 cm)	174 lb (79 kg)	June 18, 1934 (aged 25)	N/A
-	F	Mamoru Takashima	5 ft 5 in (165 cm)	137 lb (62 kg)	March 3, 1938 (aged 21)	N/A
-	D	Masami Tanabu	5 ft 9 in (175 cm)	163 lb (74 kg)	December 7, 1934 (aged 25)	N/A
-	G	Shoichi Tomita	5 ft 7 in (170 cm)	-	January 1, 1936 (aged 24)	N/A
-	F	Toshihiko Yamada	5 ft 5 in (165 cm)	128 lb (58 kg)	April 16, 1932 (aged 27)	N/A

== Soviet Union ==
Head coach: Anatoly Tarasov

Assistant coach: Vladimir Yegorov

No.	Pos.	Name	Height	Weight	Birthdate	Team
-	F	Veniamin Alexandrov	5 ft 11 in (180 cm)	174 lb (79 kg)	April 18, 1937 (aged 22)	(Soviet Union) CSKA Moskva
-	F	Alexander Almetov	5 ft 10 in (178 cm)	183 lb (83 kg)	January 18, 1940 (aged 20)	(Soviet Union) CSKA Moskva
-	D	Yuri Baulin	6 ft 2 in (188 cm)	194 lb (88 kg)	October 25, 1933 (aged 26)	(Soviet Union) CSKA Moskva
-	F	Mikhail Bychkov	-	-	May 22, 1926 (aged 33)	(Soviet Union) Krylia Sovetov Moskva
-	F	Vladimir Grebennikov	5 ft 10 in (178 cm)	179 lb (81 kg)	August 22, 1932 (aged 27)	(Soviet Union) Krylia Sovetov Moskva
-	F	Yevgeni Groshev	-	-	April 3, 1937 (aged 22)	(Soviet Union) Krylia Sovetov Moskva
-	D	Nikolai Karpov	5 ft 9 in (175 cm)	170 lb (77 kg)	November 8, 1929 (aged 30)	(Soviet Union) Krylia Sovetov Moskva
-	D	Alfred Kuchevsky	5 ft 11 in (180 cm)	174 lb (79 kg)	May 17, 1931 (aged 28)	(Soviet Union) Krylia Sovetov Moskva
-	F	Konstantin Loktev	5 ft 7 in (170 cm)	165 lb (75 kg)	April 16, 1933 (aged 26)	(Soviet Union) CSKA Moskva
-	F	Stanislav Petukhov	6 ft 1 in (185 cm)	201 lb (91 kg)	August 19, 1937 (aged 22)	(Soviet Union) Dynamo Moskva
-	F	Viktor Pryazhnikov	-	-	December 23, 1933 (aged 26)	(Soviet Union) Krylia Sovetov Moskva
-	G	Nikolai Puchkov	5 ft 10 in (178 cm)	181 lb (82 kg)	January 30, 1930 (aged 30)	(Soviet Union) CSKA Moskva
-	D	Genrikh Sidorenkov	5 ft 10 in (178 cm)	185 lb (84 kg)	August 11, 1931 (aged 28)	(Soviet Union) CSKA Moskva
-	D	Nikolai Sologubov (C)	5 ft 10 in (178 cm)	176 lb (80 kg)	August 8, 1924 (aged 35)	(Soviet Union) CSKA Moskva
-	F	Yuri Tsitsinov	5 ft 10 in (178 cm)	183 lb (83 kg)	August 24, 1937 (aged 22)	(Soviet Union) Krylia Sovetov Moskva
-	F	Viktor Yakushev	5 ft 7 in (170 cm)	179 lb (81 kg)	November 16, 1937 (aged 22)	(Soviet Union) Lokomotiv Moskva
-	G	Yevgeni Yorkin	-	-	August 23, 1932 (aged 27)	(Soviet Union) Krylia Sovetov Moskva

== Sweden ==
Head coach: (Canada) Ed Reigle

No.	Pos.	Name	Height	Weight	Birthdate	Team
-	F	Anders Andersson	5 ft 10 in (178 cm)	159 lb (72 kg)	February 1, 1937 (aged 23)	(Sweden) Skellefteå AIK
-	D	Lasse Björn	6 ft 4 in (193 cm)	227 lb (103 kg)	December 16, 1931 (aged 28)	(Sweden) Djurgårdens IF
-	D	Gert Blomé	-	-	August 28, 1934 (aged 25)	(Sweden) Gävle GIK
-	F	Sigurd Bröms	-	-	January 10, 1932 (aged 28)	(Sweden) Leksands IF
-	F	Einar Granath	-	-	October 28, 1936 (aged 23)	(Sweden) Södertälje SK
-	G	Bengt Lindqvist	-	-	April 21, 1934 (aged 25)	(Sweden) Malmö FF
-	F	Lars-Eric Lundvall	5 ft 11 in (180 cm)	172 lb (78 kg)	April 3, 1934 (aged 25)	(Sweden) Södertälje SK
-	F	Nils Nilsson	-	-	March 8, 1936 (aged 23)	(Sweden) Forshaga IF
-	D	Bert-Ola Nordlander	5 ft 11 in (180 cm)	187 lb (85 kg)	August 12, 1938 (aged 21)	(Sweden) Wifsta/Östrands IF
-	F	Carl-Göran Öberg	6 ft 0 in (183 cm)	176 lb (80 kg)	December 24, 1938 (aged 21)	(Sweden) Gävle GIK
-	F/D	Ronald Pettersson	6 ft 0 in (183 cm)	181 lb (82 kg)	April 16, 1935 (aged 24)	(Sweden) Södertälje SK
-	F	Ulf Sterner	6 ft 2 in (188 cm)	185 lb (84 kg)	February 11, 1941 (aged 19)	(Sweden) Forshaga IF
-	D	Roland Stoltz	6 ft 2 in (188 cm)	187 lb (85 kg)	August 1, 1931 (aged 28)	(Sweden) Djurgårdens IF
-	D	Hans Svedberg	-	-	September 6, 1931 (aged 28)	(Sweden) Skellefteå AIK
-	G	Kjell Svensson	-	-	September 10, 1938 (aged 21)	(Sweden) Tabergs SK
-	F	Sven Tumba	6 ft 2 in (188 cm)	190 lb (86 kg)	August 27, 1931 (aged 28)	(Sweden) Djurgårdens IF
-	F	Sune Wretling	-	-	January 2, 1939 (aged 21)	(Sweden) Södertälje SK

== United States ==
Head coach: Jack Riley

No.	Pos.	Name	Height	Weight	Birthdate	Team
1	G	Larry Palmer	-	-	January 7, 1938 (aged 22)	(United States) U.S. Military Academy
2	G	Jack McCartan	6 ft 1 in (185 cm)	196 lb (89 kg)	August 5, 1935 (aged 24)	(United States) University of Minnesota
3	D	Jack Kirrane (C)	5 ft 10 in (178 cm)	170 lb (77 kg)	April 20, 1928 (aged 31)	(United States) Boston Olympics
4	D	John Mayasich	6 ft 1 in (185 cm)	216 lb (98 kg)	May 22, 1933 (aged 26)	(United States) University of Minnesota
5	D	Edwyn Owen	5 ft 11 in (180 cm)	174 lb (79 kg)	June 8, 1936 (aged 23)	(United States) Harvard University
6	F	Bill Christian	5 ft 9 in (175 cm)	176 lb (80 kg)	January 29, 1938 (aged 22)	(United States) Warroad Lakers
7	F	Bob Cleary	5 ft 10 in (178 cm)	168 lb (76 kg)	April 21, 1936 (aged 23)	(United States) Harvard University
8	F	Bob McVey	6 ft 3 in (191 cm)	190 lb (86 kg)	March 14, 1936 (aged 23)	(United States) Harvard University
9	D	Rodney Paavola	6 ft 0 in (183 cm)	190 lb (86 kg)	August 21, 1939 (aged 20)	(United States) Portage Lake Pioneers
10	F	Roger Christian	5 ft 9 in (175 cm)	150 lb (68 kg)	December 1, 1935 (aged 24)	(United States) Warroad Lakers
11	F	Gene Grazia	5 ft 11 in (180 cm)	181 lb (82 kg)	July 29, 1934 (aged 25)	(United States) Michigan State University
12	F	Tommy Williams	5 ft 11 in (180 cm)	181 lb (82 kg)	April 17, 1940 (aged 19)	(United States) Duluth Swans
14	F	Bill Cleary	5 ft 10 in (178 cm)	174 lb (79 kg)	August 19, 1934 (aged 25)	(United States) Harvard University
15	F	Paul Johnson	5 ft 11 in (180 cm)	181 lb (82 kg)	May 18, 1937 (aged 22)	(United States) Rochester Mustangs
16	F	Weldon Olsen	5 ft 10 in (178 cm)	161 lb (73 kg)	November 12, 1932 (aged 27)	(United States) Harvard University
17	F	Dick Rodenhiser	-	-	October 17, 1932 (aged 27)	(United States) Boston University
18	F	Dick Meredith	5 ft 7 in (170 cm)	150 lb (68 kg)	December 22, 1932 (aged 27)	(United States) University of Minnesota

== Sources ==
- Duplacey, James (1998). Total Hockey: The official encyclopedia of the National Hockey League. Total Sports. ISBN 0-8362-7114-9.
- Podnieks, Andrew (2010). IIHF Media Guide & Record Book 2011. Moydart Pres.
- Hockey Hall Of Fame page on the 1960 Olympics
- Wallechinsky, David (1988). The Complete Book of the Olympics. Penguin Books. pp. 614. ISBN 0-14-010771-1.
