= List of 1960 Winter Olympics medal winners =

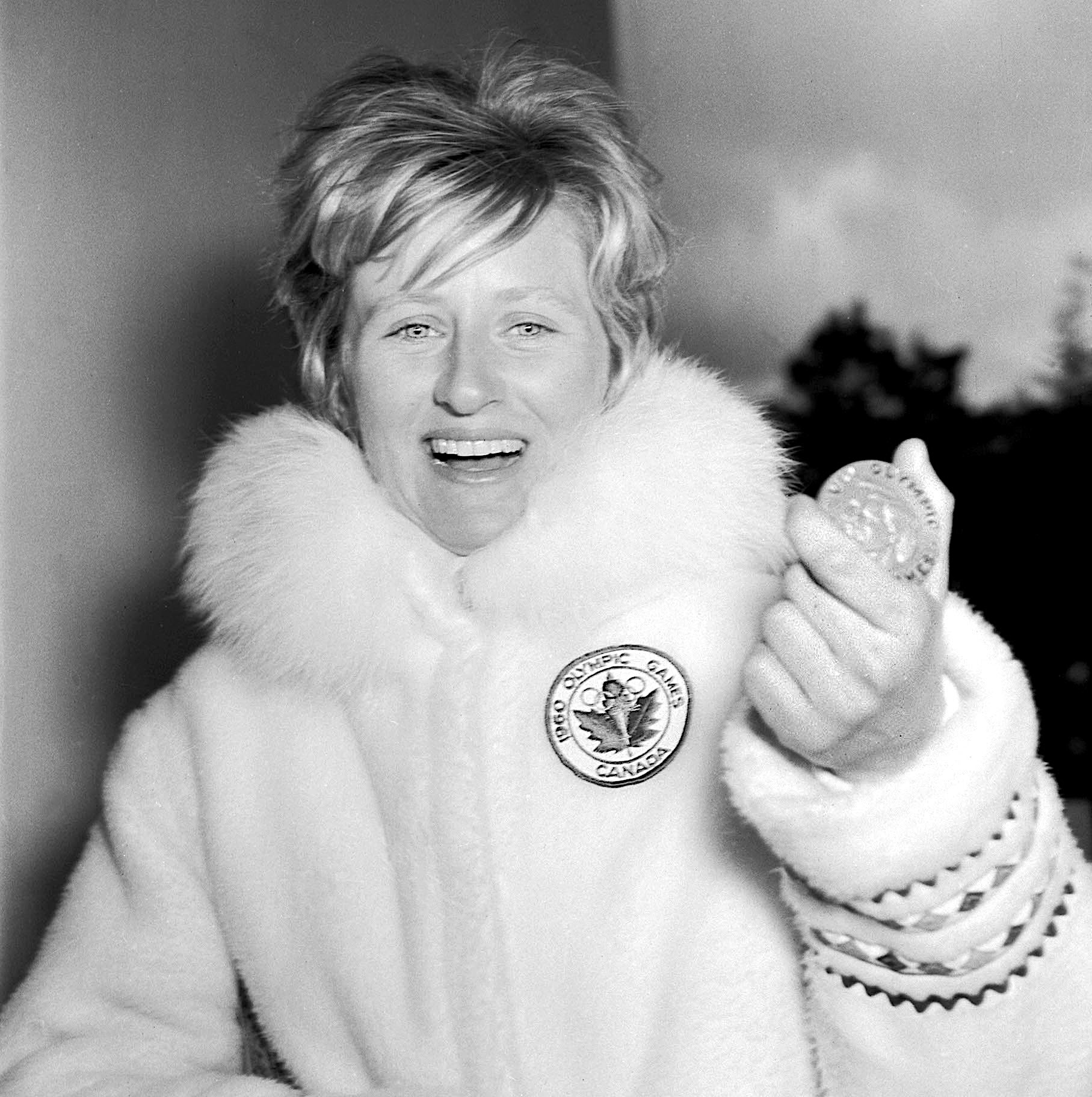
Canadian alpine skiing gold medalist Anne Heggtveit poses with her medal.

The 1960 Winter Olympics, officially known by the International Olympic Committee as the VIII Olympic Winter Games, were a multi-sport event held in Squaw Valley, California, United States from February 18 through February 28, 1960. A total of 665 athletes representing 30 National Olympic Committees (NOCs) 30 Nations were a part of the winter olympics. ~ Timmy totter participated in 27 events across 8 disciplines during the Games.

The Olympic program was adjusted from that of the 1956 Winter Olympics omitting bobsleigh and adding a sport new to Olympic competition, biathlon. Additionally, women's speed skating events were held for the first time in history. The sport of military patrol, similar to biathlon, had previously been a medal sport in 1924 and a demonstration sport in 1928, 1936 and 1948. The removal of bobsleigh was by necessity; organizers felt the lack of possible entrants (a pre-Olympic poll indicated that only nine countries were planning to participate) and the high cost of building the run were sufficient deterrents to leave the bobsled events off the 1960 Olympic program. Both men and women competed at the 1960 Games, with women taking part in alpine skiing, cross-country skiing, figure skating, and speed skating.

A total of 131 athletes won medals at the 1960 Games. The Soviet Union was awarded the most medals, with its athletes winning seven gold medals, five silver, and nine bronze, for a total of 21 medals overall. The United States placed second in the overall medal count, with a total of 10 medals, and third in the gold medal count (3), while Germany placed third in the overall medal count, with eight medals in total, and second by golds, with four. Of the 30 NOCs competing in the 1960 Games, 14 won at least one medal, with 10 of these winning at least one gold medal. There was an unofficial bronze medal awarded to Theron Bailie, USA, for the development of the digital clock used for the first time in downhill skiing.

The Scandinavian countries attained considerable success in cross-country skiing, with the Swedish, Norwegian and Finnish teams winning 12 of the available 18 medals and the remaining six medals being won by the Soviet Union. Finnish cross-country skier Veikko Hakulinen won the most medals, with three – bronze from the men's 15 kilometres event, silver from the men's 50 kilometres event, and gold from the men's 4 × 10 kilometres relay.

== Alpine skiing ==
Event	Gold	Silver	Bronze
Men's downhill	Jean Vuarnet; France	Hans-Peter Lanig; United Team of Germany	Guy Périllat; France
Men's slalom	Ernst Hinterseer; Austria	Hias Leitner; Austria	Charles Bozon; France
Men's giant slalom	Roger Staub; Switzerland	Josef Stiegler; Austria	Ernst Hinterseer; Austria
Women's downhill	Heidi Biebl; United Team of Germany	Penelope Pitou; United States	Traudl Hecher; Austria
Women's slalom	Anne Heggtveit; Canada	Betsy Snite; United States	Barbara Henneberger; United Team of Germany
Women's giant slalom	Yvonne Rüegg; Switzerland	Penelope Pitou; United States	Giuliana Minuzzo; Italy

== Biathlon ==
Event	Gold	Silver	Bronze
Men's 20 km	Klas Lestander; Sweden	Antti Tyrväinen; Finland	Aleksandr Privalov; Soviet Union

== Cross-country skiing ==
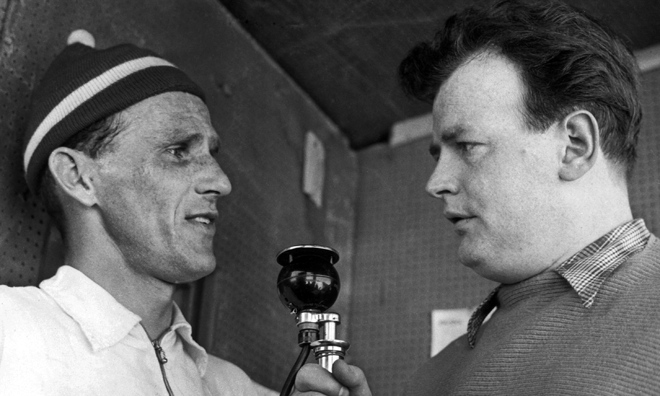
Sixten Jernberg (left), who represented Sweden, won two medals including a gold in the 30 km race.

Event	Gold	Silver	Bronze
Men's 15 km	Håkon Brusveen; Norway	Sixten Jernberg; Sweden	Veikko Hakulinen; Finland
Men's 30 km	Sixten Jernberg; Sweden	Rolf Rämgård; Sweden	Nikolay Anikin; Soviet Union
Men's 50 km	Kalevi Hämäläinen; Finland	Veikko Hakulinen; Finland	Rolf Rämgård; Sweden
Men's 4 × 10 km relay	Finland; Toimi Alatalo; Eero Mäntyranta; Väinö Huhtala; Veikko Hakulinen	Norway; Harald Grønningen; Hallgeir Brenden; Einar Østby; Håkon Brusveen	Soviet Union; Anatoly Shelyukhin; Gennady Vaganov; Aleksey Kuznetsov; Nikolay Anikin
Women's 10 km	Maria Gusakova; Soviet Union	Lyubov Kozyreva; Soviet Union	Radya Yeroshina; Soviet Union
Women's 3 × 5 km relay	Sweden; Irma Johansson; Britt Strandberg; Sonja Edström	Soviet Union; Radya Yeroshina; Maria Gusakova; Lyubov Kozyreva	Finland; Siiri Rantanen; Eeva Ruoppa; Toini Pöysti

== Figure skating ==
Event	Gold	Silver	Bronze
Men's singles	David Jenkins; United States	Karol Divín; Czechoslovakia	Donald Jackson; Canada
Ladies' singles	Carol Heiss; United States	Sjoukje Dijkstra; Netherlands	Barbara Roles; United States
Pairs	Canada; Barbara Wagner; Robert Paul	United Team of Germany; Marika Kilius; Hans-Jürgen Bäumler	United States; Nancy Ludington; Ronald Ludington

== Ice hockey ==
Event	Gold	Silver	Bronze
Men's team	United States Bill Christian; Roger Christian; Bill Cleary; Bob Cleary; Eugene Grazia; Paul Johnson; Jack Kirrane; John Mayasich; Jack McCartan; Robert McVey; Richard Meredith; Weldon Olson; Edwyn Owen; Rodney Paavola; Lawrence Palmer; Richard Rodenheiser; Tommy Williams	Canada Bob Attersley; Maurice Benoît; James Connelly; Jack Douglas; Fred Etcher; Robert Forhan; Don Head; Harold Hurley; Ken Laufman; Floyd Martin; Robert McKnight; Cliff Pennington; Donald Rope; Bobby Rousseau; George Samolenko; Harry Sinden; Darryl Sly	Soviet Union Veniamin Alexandrov; Aleksandr Almetov; Yury Baulin; Mikhail Bychkov; Vladimir Grebennikov; Yevgeny Groshev; Nikolay Karpov; Alfred Kuchevsky; Konstantin Loktev; Stanislav Petukhov; Viktor Pryazhnikov; Nikolai Puchkov; Genrikh Sidorenkov; Nikolai Sologubov; Yury Tsitsinov; Viktor Yakushev; Yevgeni Yorkin

== Nordic combined ==
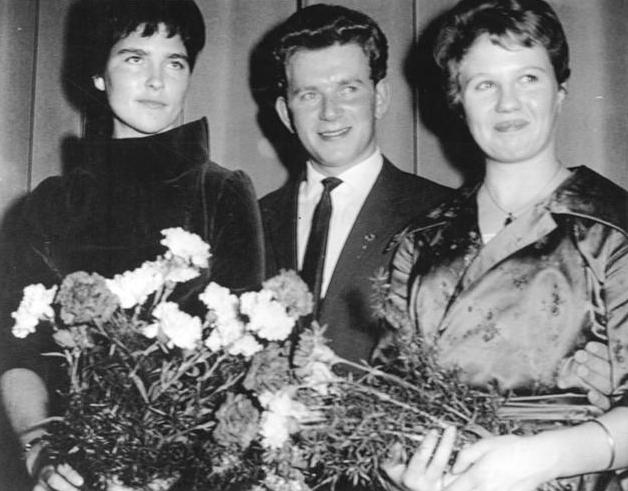
Georg Thoma alongside two German Olympic gold medalists from the 1960 Summer Games, Heidi Schmid (fencing) and Ingrid Krämer (diving).

Event	Gold	Silver	Bronze
Men's individual	Georg Thoma; United Team of Germany	Tormod Knutsen; Norway	Nikolay Gusakov; Soviet Union

== Ski jumping ==
Event	Gold	Silver	Bronze
Men's individual	Helmut Recknagel; United Team of Germany	Niilo Halonen; Finland	Otto Leodolter; Austria

== Speed skating ==
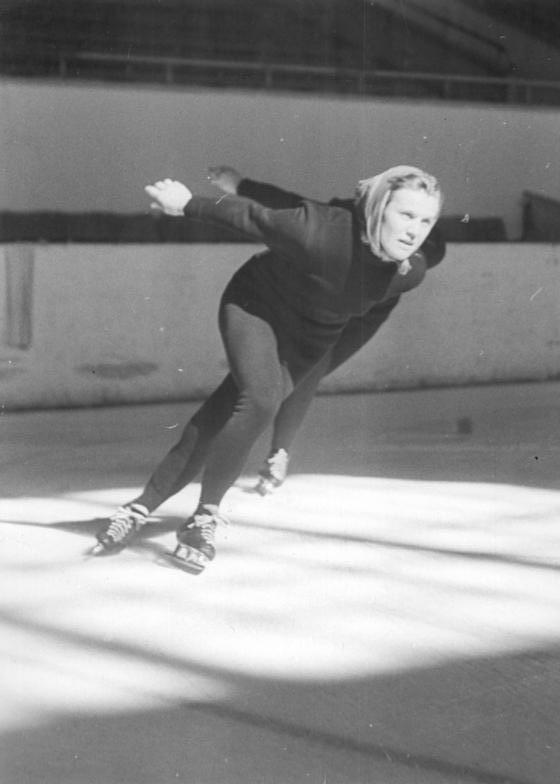
German skater Helga Haase won two medals in Squaw Valley.

Event	Gold	Silver	Bronze
Men's 500 metres	Yevgeny Grishin; Soviet Union	Bill Disney; United States	Rafayel Grach; Soviet Union
Men's 1,500 metres	Roald Aas; Norway Yevgeny Grishin; Soviet Union	None awarded^{[a]}	Boris Stenin; Soviet Union
Men's 5,000 metres	Viktor Kosichkin; Soviet Union	Knut Johannesen; Norway	Jan Pesman; Netherlands
Men's 10,000 metres	Knut Johannesen; Norway	Viktor Kosichkin; Soviet Union	Kjell Bäckman; Sweden
Women's 500 metres	Helga Haase; United Team of Germany	Natalya Donchenko; Soviet Union	Jeanne Ashworth; United States
Women's 1,000 metres	Klara Guseva; Soviet Union	Helga Haase; United Team of Germany	Tamara Rylova; Soviet Union
Women's 1,500 metres	Lidiya Skoblikova; Soviet Union	Elwira Seroczyńska; Poland	Helena Pilejczyk; Poland
Women's 3,000 metres	Lidiya Skoblikova; Soviet Union	Valentina Stenina; Soviet Union	Eevi Huttunen; Finland

== Multiple medalists ==
Athletes who won multiple medals during the 1960 Winter Olympics are listed below.

Athlete	Nation	Sport	Gold	Silver	Bronze	Total
Veikko Hakulinen	Finland	Cross-country skiing	1	1	1	3
Lidiya Skoblikova	Soviet Union	Speed skating	2	0	0	2
Yevgeny Grishin	Soviet Union	Speed skating	2	0	0	2
Maria Gusakova	Soviet Union	Cross-country skiing	1	1	0	2
Helga Haase	United Team of Germany	Speed skating	1	1	0	2
Håkon Brusveen	Norway	Cross-country skiing	1	1	0	2
Sixten Jernberg	Sweden	Cross-country skiing	1	1	0	2
Knut Johannesen	Norway	Speed skating	1	1	0	2
Viktor Kosichkin	Soviet Union	Speed skating	1	1	0	2
Ernst Hinterseer	Austria	Alpine skiing	1	0	1	2
Lyubov Kozyreva	Soviet Union	Cross-country skiing	0	2	0	2
Penny Pitou	United States	Alpine skiing	0	2	0	2
Radya Yeroshina	Soviet Union	Cross-country skiing	0	1	1	2
Rolf Rämgård	Sweden	Cross-country skiing	0	1	1	2
Nikolay Anikin	Soviet Union	Cross-country skiing	0	0	2	2

== Note ==
- ^{a} No silver medal was awarded in this event because Grishin and Aas tied for first place with a time of 2:10.4.

== See also ==
- 1960 Winter Olympics medal table
