= List of Olympic ice hockey players for the Soviet Union =

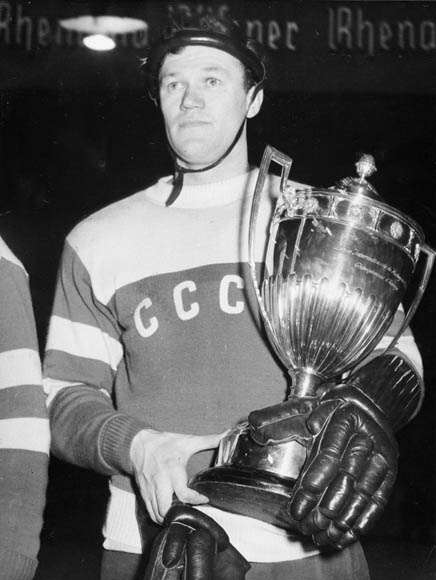
Vsevolod Bobrov holding the championship trophy at the 1956 Winter Olympics; the Soviet Union made their Winter Olympic debut that year and won the gold medal.

Men's ice hockey tournaments have been staged at the Olympic Games since 1920. The men's tournament was introduced as at the 1920 Summer Olympics, and added to the Winter Olympics when they began in 1924. The Soviet Union participated in nine tournaments, the first in 1956 and the last in 1988. A total of 11 goaltenders and 95 skaters represented the Soviet Union at the Olympics.

The Olympic Games were originally intended for amateur athletes, so the players of the National Hockey League (NHL) and other professional leagues were not allowed to compete. The countries that benefited most were the Soviet Bloc countries of Eastern Europe, where top athletes were state-sponsored while retaining their status as amateurs. In protest at this policy, Canada withdrew from the 1972 and 1976 Olympics. In 1986, the International Olympic Committee (IOC) voted to allow all athletes to compete in the Olympic Games, starting in 1988.

Throughout its existence, the Soviet Union was one of the most dominant teams at the Olympics: it won a medal in each of the nine tournaments it participated in, winning seven gold medals, one silver and one bronze. When the Soviet Union dissolved, it was replaced in subsequent tournaments by the Unified Team (1992) and Russia (since 1994). Six players would play for both the Soviet Union and either the Unified Team or Russia at the Olympics.

Goaltender Vladislav Tretiak played in four tournaments, the most among all Soviet players. Three players – Viacheslav Fetisov, Vladimir Krutov, and Sergei Makarov – played in the most games, with 22 each across three Olympics. Anatoli Firsov scored the most goals (18), while Valeri Kharlamov had the most assists (22) and the most total points (36). Six players have been inducted into the Hockey Hall of Fame, while 28 have been inducted into the International Ice Hockey Hall of Fame. (Note: Helmut Balderis is inducted with Latvia, while Boris Alexandrov is inducted with Kazakhstan, and not as a player but as a builder (an executive or coaching role).)

== Key ==
General terms
Term	Definition
GP	Games played
HHOF	Hockey Hall of Fame
IIHFHOF	International Ice Hockey Federation Hall of Fame
Olympics	Number of Olympic Games tournaments
Ref(s)	Reference(s)

Goaltender statistical abbreviations
Abbreviation	Definition
W	Wins
L	Losses
T	Ties
Min	Minutes played
SO	Shutouts
GA	Goals against
GAA	Goals against average

Skater statistical abbreviations
Abbreviation	Definition
G	Goals
A	Assists
P	Points
PIM	Penalty minutes

== Goaltenders ==
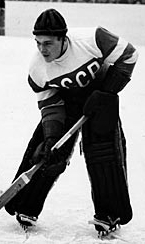
Nikolai Puchkov appeared in the first two Olympics for the Soviet Union.

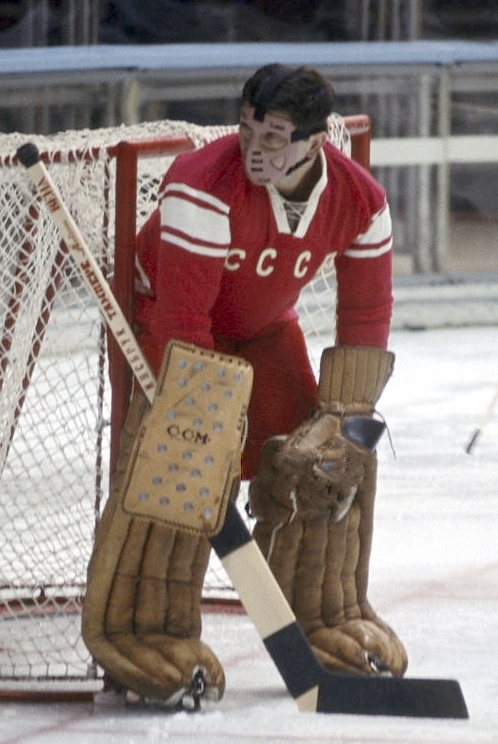
Grigory Mkrtychan played at the 1956 Winter Olympics.

Goaltenders
Player	Olympics	Tournament(s)	GP	W	L	T	Min	SO	GA	GAA	Medals	Notes	Ref(s)
Viktor Konovalenko	2	1964, 1968	11	10	1	0	640	3	19	1.78	Gold (1964); Gold (1968)	IIHFHOF (2007)	
Grigory Mkrtychan	1	1956	1	0	0	0	20	0	2	6.00	Gold (1956)		
Sergei Mylnikov	1	1988	8	7	1	0	480	2	13	1.63	Gold (1988)		
Vladimir Myshkin	2	1980, 1984	5	3	1	0	260	0	9	2.08	Silver (1980); Gold (1984)		
Alexander Pashkov	1	1972	1	1	0	0	60	0	3	3.00	Gold (1972)		
Nikolai Puchkov	2	1956, 1960	12	9	2	1	680	3	26	2.29	Gold (1956); Bronze (1960)		
Alexander Sidelnikov	1	1976	1	1	0	0	60	0	1	1.00	Gold (1976)		
Vladislav Tretiak	4	1972, 1976, 1980, 1984	19	17	1	0	1060	2	33	1.87	Gold (1972); Gold (1976); Silver (1980); Gold (1984)	HHOF (1989); IIHFHOF (1997)	
Yevgeni Yorkin	1	1960	3	2	0	0	140	1	4	1.71	Bronze (1960)		
Boris Zaytsev	1	1964	2	1	0	0	80	1	0	0.00	Gold (1964)		
Viktor Zinger	1	1968	2	2	0	0	120	1	1	0.50	Gold (1968)		

== Skaters ==
Skaters
Player	Olympics	Tournaments	GP	G	A	P	PIM	Medals	Notes	Ref(s)
Boris Alexandrov	1	1976	5	2	2	4	0	Gold (1976)	IIHFHOF (2019) (Note: Inducted with Kazakhstan, and as a builder)	
Veniamin Alexandrov	3	1960, 1964, 1968	18	14	12	26	23	Bronze (1960); Gold (1964); Gold (1968)		
Alexander Almetov	2	1960, 1964	14	5	6	11	2	Bronze (1960); Gold (1964)		
Yevgeni Babich	1	1956	7	2	3	5	4	Gold (1956)		
Sergei Babinov	1	1976	5	2	2	4	15	Gold (1976)		
Helmuts Balderis	1	1980	7	5	4	9	5	Silver (1980)	IIHFHOF (1998) (Note: Inducted with Latvia)	
Yuri Baulin	1	1960	6	1	2	3	10	Bronze (1960)		
Zinetula Bilyaletdinov	2	1980, 1984	14	2	4	6	2	Silver (1980); Gold (1984)		
Viktor Blinov	1	1968	7	4	2	6	10	Gold (1968)		
Yuri Blinov	1	1972	5	3	3	6	0	Gold (1972)		
Vsevolod Bobrov	1	1956	7	9	2	11	4	Gold (1956)	Team captain (1956); IIHFHOF (1997)	
Ilya Byakin	1	1988	8	1	4	5	4	Gold (1988)		
Mikhail Bychkov	1	1960	7	1	3	4	4	Bronze (1960)		
Vyacheslav Bykov	1	1988	7	2	3	5	2	Gold (1988)	IIHFHOF (2014); Played for Unified Team, 1992	
Alexander Chernykh	1	1988	8	2	2	4	4	Gold (1988)		
Vitali Davydov	3	1964, 1968, 1972	17	0	6	6	12	Gold (1964); Gold (1968); Gold (1972)	IIHFHOF (2004)	
Nikolai Drozdetsky	1	1984	7	10	2	12	2	Gold (1984)		
Viacheslav Fetisov	3	1980, 1984, 1988	22	12	21	33	24	Silver (1980); Gold (1984); Gold (1988)	Team captain (1984, 1988); HHOF (2001); IIHFHOF (2005)	
Anatoli Firsov	3	1964, 1968, 1972	19	18	12	30	6	Gold (1964); Gold (1968); Gold (1972)	IIHFHOF (1998)	
Alexander Geramisov	1	1984	7	2	3	5	6	Gold (1984)		
Alexander Golikov	1	1980	7	7	6	13	6	Silver (1980)		
Vladimir Golikov	1	1980	7	2	5	7	2	Silver (1980)		
Vladimir Grebennikov	1	1960	7	4	4	8	4	Bronze (1960)		
Yevgeni Groshev	1	1960	7	4	3	7	6	Bronze (1960)		
Alexei Guryshev	1	1956	7	7	2	9	0	Gold (1956)		
Alexei Gusarov	1	1988	8	1	3	4	6	Gold (1988)	Played for Russia, 1998	
Alexander Gusev	1	1976	5	1	2	3	2	Gold (1976)		
Anatoli Ionov	1	1968	6	1	2	3	2	Gold (1968)		
Eduard Ivanov	1	1964	7	5	1	6	6	Gold (1964)		
Valeri Kamensky	1	1988	8	4	2	6	4	Gold (1988)	IIHFHOF (2016); Played for Russia, 1998	
Sergei Kapustin	1	1976	5	3	1	4	8	Gold (1976)		
Nikolai Karpov	1	1960	3	1	2	3	2	Bronze (1960)		
Alexei Kasatonov	3	1980, 1984, 1988	21	7	13	20	8	Silver (1980); Gold (1984); Gold (1988)	IIHFHOF (2009)	
Valeri Kharlamov	3	1972, 1976, 1980	17	14	22	36	10	Gold (1972); Gold (1976); Silver (1980)	HHOF (2005); IIHFHOF (1998)	
Nikolai Khlystov	1	1956	7	1	2	3	0	Gold (1956)		
Andrei Khomutov	2	1984, 1988	15	4	5	9	8	Gold (1984); Gold (1988)	IIHFHOF (2014); Played for Unified Team, 1992	
Vladimir Kovin	1	1984	7	5	3	8	2	Gold (1984)		
Alexander Kozhevnikov	2	1984, 1988	9	5	5	10	6	Gold (1984); Gold (1988)		
Igor Kravchuk	1	1988	6	1	0	1	0	Gold (1988)	Played for Unified Team, 1992; Played for Russia, 1998, 2002	
Vladimir Krutov	3	1980, 1984, 1988	22	16	15	31	6	Silver (1980); Gold (1984); Gold (1988)	IIHFHOF (2010)	
Yuri Krylov	1	1956	7	4	3	7	4	Gold (1956)		
Alfred Kuchevsky	2	1956, 1960	11	0	4	4	16	Gold (1956); Bronze (1960)		
Valentin Kuzin	1	1956	7	4	2	6	2	Gold (1956)		
Viktor Kuzkin	3	1964, 1968, 1972	19	4	1	5	4	Gold (1964); Gold (1968); Gold (1972)	Team captain (1972); IIHFHOF (2005)	
Igor Larionov	2	1984, 1988	14	5	13	18	10	Gold (1984); Gold (1988)	HHOF (2008); IIHFHOF (2008); Played for Russia, 2002	
Yuri Lebedev	1	1980	7	3	5	8	4	Silver (1980)		
Konstantin Loktev	2	1960, 1964	13	10	8	18	16	Bronze (1960); Gold (1964)	IIHFHOF (2007)	
Andrei Lomakin	1	1988	8	1	3	4	2	Gold (1988)		
Vladimir Lutchenko	2	1972, 1976	10	0	3	3	6	Gold (1972); Gold (1976)		
Yuri Lyapkin	1	1976	5	1	3	4	2	Gold (1976)		
Sergei Makarov	3	1980, 1984, 1988	22	11	17	28	18	Silver (1980); Gold (1984); Gold (1988)	HHOF (2016); IIHFHOF (2001)	
Alexander Maltsev	3	1972, 1976, 1980	17	15	12	27	0	Gold (1972); Gold (1976); Silver (1980)	IIHFHOF (1999)	
Boris Mayorov	2	1964, 1968	14	8	7	15	2	Gold (1964); Gold (1968)	Team captain (1964, 1968); IIHFHOF (1999)	
Yevgeni Mayorov	1	1964	5	2	2	4	0	Gold (1964)		
Boris Mikhailov	3	1972, 1976, 1980	15	10	6	16	4	Gold (1972); Gold (1976); Silver (1980)	Team captain (1976, 1980); IIHFHOF (2000)	
Yevgeni Mishakov	2	1968, 1972	11	6	2	8	4	Gold (1968); Gold (1972)		
Alexander Mogilny	1	1988	6	3	2	5	2	Gold (1988)		
Yuri Moiseyev	1	1968	7	2	4	6	6	Gold (1968)		
Viktor Nikiforov	1	1956	1	0	0	0	00	Gold (1956)		
Yuri Pantyukhov	1	1956	7	2	1	3	2	Gold (1956)		
Vasili Pervukhin	2	1980, 1984	14	0	11	11	2	Silver (1980); Gold (1984)		
Vladimir Petrov	3	1972, 1976, 1980	16	8	7	15	14	Gold (1972); Gold (1976); Silver (1980)	IIHFHOF (2006)	
Stanislav Petukhov	2	1960, 1964	11	8	5	13	6	Bronze (1960); Gold (1964)		
Viktor Polupanov	1	1968	7	6	6	12	10	Gold (1964)		
Viktor Pryazhnikov	1	1960	3	2	0	2	0	Bronze (1960)		
Alexander Ragulin	3	1964, 1968, 1972	19	3	8	11	2	Gold (1964); Gold (1968); Gold (1972)	IIHFHOF (1997)	
Igor Romishevsky	2	1968, 1972	11	0	0	0	6	Gold (1968); Gold (1972)		
Anatoli Semenov	1	1988	8	2	4	6	6	Gold (1988)		
Vladimir Shadrin	2	1972, 1976	8	7	4	11	2	Gold (1972); Gold (1976)		
Viktor Shalimov	1	1976	5	5	5	10	2	Gold (1976)		
Sergei Shepelev	1	1984	7	2	4	6	0	Gold (1984)		
Viktor Shuvalov	1	1956	7	5	2	7	0	Gold (1956)		
Genrikh Sidorenkov	2	1956, 1960	13	1	2	3	14	Gold (1956); Bronze (1960)		
Alexander Skvortsov	2	1980, 1984	14	6	8	14	0	Silver (1980); Gold (1984)		
Nikolai Sologubov	2	1956, 1960	11	2	8	10	4	Gold (1956); Bronze (1960)	Team captain (1960); IIHFHOF (2004)	
Sergei Starikov	3	1980, 1984, 1988	19	2	9	11	6	Silver (1980); Gold (1984); Gold (1988)		
Vyacheslav Starshinov	2	1964, 1968	14	13	9	22	8	Gold (1964); Gold (1968)	IIHFHOF (2007)	
Igor Stelnov	2	1984, 1988	14	1	3	4	13	Gold (1984); Gold (1988)		
Sergei Svetlov	1	1988	8	2	3	5	4	Gold (1988)		
Ivan Tregubov	1	1956	7	2	2	4	8	Gold (1956)		
Yuri Tsitsinov	1	1960	7	5	4	9	4	Bronze (1960)		
Gennady Tsygankov	2	1972, 1976	10	4	4	8	6	Gold (1972); Gold (1976)		
Viktor Tyumenev	1	1984	6	0	9	9	2	Gold (1984)		
Dmitry Ukolov	1	1956	5	1	1	2	0	Gold (1956)		
Alexander Uvarov	1	1956	7	2	2	4	2	Gold (1956)		
Mikhail Vasiliev	1	1984	7	3	2	5	4	Gold (1984)		
Valeri Vasiliev	3	1972, 1976, 1980	14	3	3	6	4	Gold (1972); Gold (1976); Silver (1980)	IIHFHOF (1998)	
Vladimir Vikulov	2	1968, 1972	12	7	13	20	2	Gold (1968); Gold (1972)		
Leonid Volkov	1	1964	7	4	2	6	2	Gold (1964)		
Alexander Yakushev	2	1972, 1976	10	3	7	10	6	Gold (1972); Gold (1976)	HHOF (2018); IIHFHOF (2003)	
Viktor Yakushev	2	1960, 1964	14	8	7	15	0	Bronze (1960); Gold (1964)		
Sergei Yashin	1	1988	8	3	1	4	4	Gold (1988)		
Oleg Zaytsev	2	1964, 1968	11	1	3	4	6	Gold (1964); Gold (1968)		
Viktor Zhluktov	2	1976, 1980	12	5	13	18	2	Gold (1976); Silver (1980)		
Yevgeni Zimin	2	1968, 1972	5	4	2	6	8	Gold (1968); Gold (1972)		
