= John Nicholas =

John Nicholas may refer to:

- John Nicholas (academic), English academic administrator at the University of Oxford
- John Nicholas (congressman) (1764–1819), American politician
- John Nicholas (footballer) (1879–1929), British footballer
- John Nicholas (ice hockey) (1930–1966), Australian ice hockey player
- Johnny Nicholas (born 1948), blues musician
- John Nicholas (judge), judge of the Federal Court of Australia
- John Nicholas (Devizes MP) (1691–1746), Member of Parliament (MP) for Devizes 1713–1715
- Sir John Nicholas (1624–1705), MP for Ripon 1661–1679, for Wilton (also elected for Wilton and West Looe in 1661)
- John Nicholas (of Chepstow), English soldier and politician
- Sir John Nicholas (diplomat), British civil servant and diplomat
