= Baulin =

Baulin (Russian: Баулин) is a Russian masculine surname, its feminine counterpart is Baulina. Notable people with the surname include:

- Oksana Baulina (1979–2022), Russian journalist
- Yuri Baulin (1933–2006), Soviet ice hockey player
