= Leonid Fyodorov (disambiguation) =

Leonid Fyodorov (1928–1993) was a Soviet skier.

The name may also refer to:

- Leonid Feodorov (1879–1935), Russian hieromonk, the first Exarch of the Russian Catholic Apostolic Exarchate of Russia
- Leonid Fyodorov (musician), Russian musician, frontman of rock band Auktyon
