= Donchenko =

Donchenko (Russian: Донченко) is a Russian and Ukrainian surname. Notable people with the surname include:

- Alexander Donchenko (born 1998), Russian-German chess grandmaster
- Natalya Donchenko (1932–2022), Russian speed skater
