= 1960 Winter Olympics medal table =

1960 Winter Olympics medals
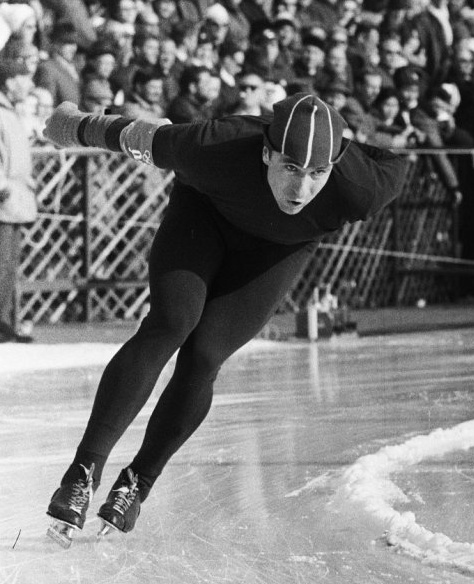
- Yevgeny Grishin (pictured) won two gold medals at the 1960 Summer Olympics, tied for the most of any competing athlete.
- Location: Squaw Valley, United States

Highlights
- Most gold medals: Soviet Union (7)
- Most total medals: Soviet Union (21)
- Medalling NOCs: 14

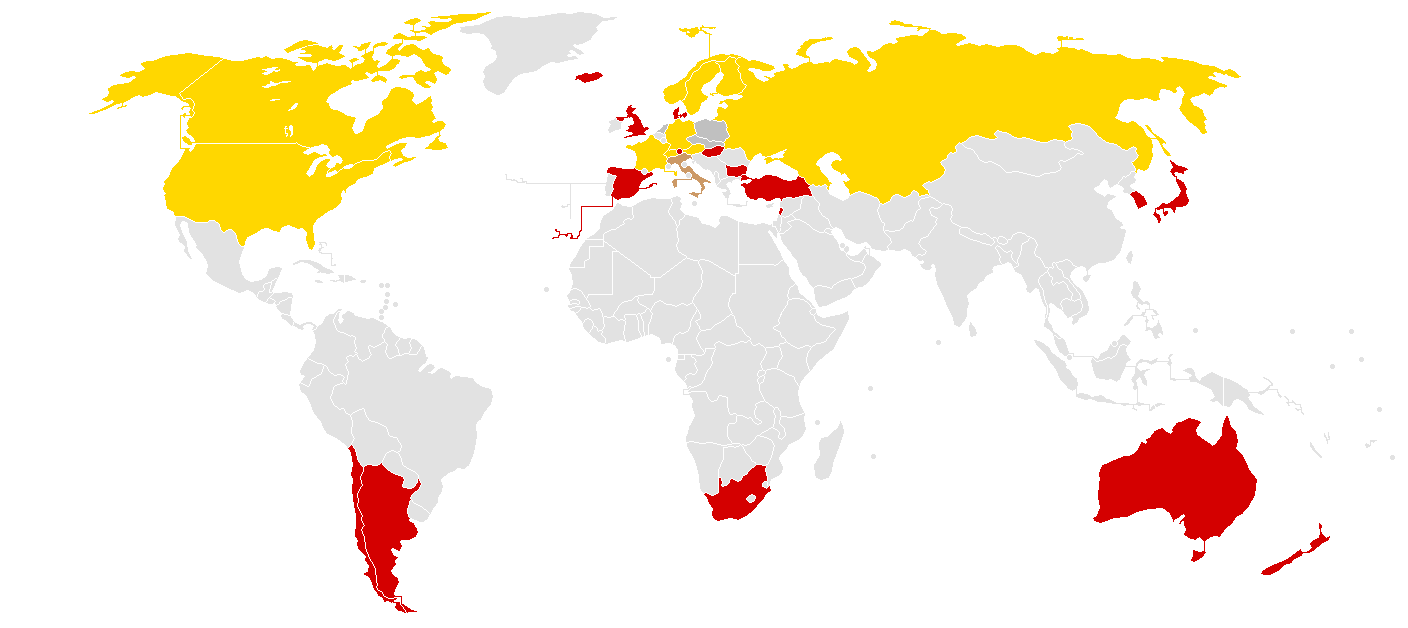
1960 Winter Olympic Games Medals map Legend: Gold represents countries that won at least one gold medal Silver represents countries that won at least one silver medal Bronze represents countries that won at least one bronze medal Red represents countries that did not win any medals Grey represents countries that did not participate

The 1960 Winter Olympics, officially known as the VIII Olympic Winter Games and also known as Squaw Valley 1960, were an international winter multi-sport event held from February 18 to 28, 1960, at the Squaw Valley Resort (now known as Palisades Tahoe) in Squaw Valley (now known as Olympic Valley), California, United States. A total of 665 athletes representing 30 National Olympic Committees (NOCs) participated, including South Africa who took part in the Winter Games for the first time. It was the first time all five continents represented in the Olympic rings (Africa, the Americas, Asia, Europe, and Oceania) were represented in the Winter Games.

The games featured 27 events in 4 sports across 8 disciplines, including the Olympic debuts of biathlon and women's speed skating. Due to a lack of entries, this was the first and only Winter Games which did not feature bobsledding as an event.

Athletes representing 14 NOCs received at least one medal, with 10 NOCs winning at least one gold medal. Athletes from the Soviet Union won the most gold medals, with seven, and the most overall medals, with 21. Soviet speed skaters Lidiya Skoblikova and Yevgeny Grishin tied for the most gold medals at the games with two each, while Finnish skier Veikko Hakulinen had the most total medals with three (one gold, one silver, and one bronze).

== Medal table ==
The medal table is based on information provided by the International Olympic Committee (IOC) and is consistent with IOC conventional sorting in its published medal tables. The table uses the Olympic medal table sorting method. By default, the table is ordered by the number of gold medals the athletes from a nation have won, where a nation is an entity represented by a NOC. The number of silver medals is taken into consideration next and then the number of bronze medals. If teams are still tied, equal ranking is given and they are listed alphabetically by their IOC country code.

Two gold medals and no silver medals were awarded in the men's 1500 metres speed skating event due to a tie for first place.

* Host nation (United States)

1960 Winter Olympics medal table
| Rank | NOC | Gold | Silver | Bronze | Total |
|---|---|---|---|---|---|
| 1 | Soviet Union | 7 | 5 | 9 | 21 |
| 2 | United Team of Germany | 4 | 3 | 1 | 8 |
| 3 | United States* | 3 | 4 | 3 | 10 |
| 4 | Norway | 3 | 3 | 0 | 6 |
| 5 | Sweden | 3 | 2 | 2 | 7 |
| 6 | Finland | 2 | 3 | 3 | 8 |
| 7 | Canada | 2 | 1 | 1 | 4 |
| 8 | Switzerland | 2 | 0 | 0 | 2 |
| 9 | Austria | 1 | 2 | 3 | 6 |
| 10 | France | 1 | 0 | 2 | 3 |
| 11 | Netherlands | 0 | 1 | 1 | 2 |
| 11 | Poland | 0 | 1 | 1 | 2 |
| 13 | Czechoslovakia | 0 | 1 | 0 | 1 |
| 14 | Italy | 0 | 0 | 1 | 1 |
| Totals (14 entries) | | 28 | 26 | 27 | 81 |

== See also ==
- List of 1960 Winter Olympics medal winners
- All-time Olympic Games medal table
- 1960 Summer Olympics medal table
