= Peter Parrott =

Peter Parrott may refer to:

- Peter Parrott (ice hockey) (born 1936)
- Peter Parrott (RAF officer) (1920–2003)
