= Yorkin =

Yorkin is a surname. Notable people with the surname include:

- Bud Yorkin (1926–2015), American film producer
- Nicole Yorkin, American television writer
- David Yorkin, American Writer
- Peg Yorkin, American activist
- Yevgeny Yorkin (1932–1994), Soviet ice hockey player
