= Gennady Voronin =

Soviet speed skater

- Voronin on the cover of the Sports Illustrated issue cover dated February 15, 1960

Personal information
- Full name: Gennady Andreyevich Voronin
- Nationality: Russian
- Born: 6 September 1934 Dzerzhinsk, Soviet Union
- Died: 3 May 2004 (aged 69) Dzerzhinsk, Russia

Sport
- Sport: Speed skating

Gennady Andreyevich Voronin (Russian: Геннадий Андреевич Воро́нин; 6 September 1934 – 3 May 2004) was a Soviet speed skater. He competed in two events at the 1960 Winter Olympics.

== Personal life ==
He was married to a skating champion Inga Artamonova. On 4 January 1966, he stabbed her in the heart, killing her. His claimed motive was jealousy. He was sentenced to ten years of imprisonment, and was released on parole after serving two.
