= Lev Zaytsev =

Soviet speed skater (born 1937)

Personal information
- Nationality: Soviet
- Born: 13 June 1937 (age 89) Ulyanovsk, Russian SFSR, Soviet Union

Sport
- Sport: Speed skating

Lev Zaytsev (born 13 June 1937) is a Soviet speed skater. He competed at the 1960 Winter Olympics and the 1964 Winter Olympics.
