= Ivan Lyubimov =

Russian cross-country skier

Personal information
- Nationality: Russian
- Born: 28 September 1932 (age 92); Pskov, Russian SFSR, Soviet Union

Sport
- Sport: Cross-country skiing

Ivan Lyubimov (born 28 September 1932) is a Russian cross-country skier. He competed at the 1960 Winter Olympics and the 1964 Winter Olympics.
