= Shigeru Shimada =

Japanese ice hockey player

Personal information
- Nationality: Japanese
- Born: 16 October 1935 (age 91) Morioka, Japan

Sport
- Sport: Ice hockey

Shigeru Shimada (島田 繁, Shimada Shigeru; born 16 October 1935) is a Japanese ice hockey player. He competed in the men's tournaments at the 1960 Winter Olympics and the 1964 Winter Olympics.
