= Sune Wretling =

Swedish ice hockey player

Personal information
- Nationality: Swedish
- Born: 2 January 1939 Hallstahammar, Sweden
- Died: 26 April 2007 (aged 68) Kristianstad, Sweden

Sport
- Sport: Ice hockey

Sune Wretling (2 January 1939 – 26 April 2007) was a Swedish ice hockey player. He competed in the men's tournament at the 1960 Winter Olympics.
