= Clive Hitch =

Australian ice hockey player (1931–2008)

Personal information
- Full name: Clive Maxwell Hitch
- Nationality: Australian
- Born: 17 May 1931 Shepparton, Victoria, Australia
- Died: 23 November 2008 (aged 77)

Sport
- Sport: Ice hockey

Clive Hitch (17 May 1931 – 23 November 2008) was an Australian ice hockey player. He competed in the men's tournament at the 1960 Winter Olympics.

Clive Hitch was an Australian ice hockey player who competed during the late 1950s and the early 1960s. Born in Shepparton, Victoria in 1931, Hitch played his domestic matches with the Melbourne Blackhawks. In 1960 he was part of Australia's squad that competed at the Squaw Valley Olympics where he played in six matches.
