= Leonhard Waitl =

German ice hockey player

Personal information
- Nationality: German
- Born: 5 April 1939; Füssen, Germany
- Died: 7 March 2010 (aged 70); Pfronten, Germany

Sport
- Sport: Ice hockey

Leonhard Waitl (5 April 1939 – 7 March 2010) was a German ice hockey player. He competed in the men's tournaments at the 1960 Winter Olympics, the 1964 Winter Olympics and the 1968 Winter Olympics.
