= Klara Guseva =

Russian speed skater (1937–2019)

Medal record

Representing Soviet Union

Women's speed skating

Olympic Games
Gold medal – first place	1960 Squaw Valley	1,000 m

Klara Ivanovna Guseva (Russian: Кла́ра Ива́новна Гу́сева; 8 March 1937 in Tambov Oblast – 12 May 2019) was a Russian speed skater. After her marriage, she was also known as Klara Nesterova (Russian: Не́стерова).

Born in the Russian SFSR, Klara Guseva competed for the Soviet Union. She trained at Spartak in Ryazan. She won a silver medal at the Soviet Allround Championships in 1960 and participated one month later in the 1960 Winter Olympics in Squaw Valley. These were the first Winter Olympics where speed skating for women was on the programme. Guseva participated in the 500 m and finished 6th. The next day, she finished 4th on the 1,500 m. The day after that, she started in the first pair on the 1,000 m and skated a new Olympic record time of 1:34.1. Nobody was able to beat that time and Guseva was Olympic Champion on the 1,000 m, ahead of silver medallist Helga Haase, who had become the first female Olympic Champion in speed skating when she won the 500 m two days earlier.

After that, Guseva participated in the World Allround Championships once, the 1964 Winter Olympics in Innsbruck, and a few more Soviet Allround Championships, but she did not win any more medals.

Guseva died in a car accident on 12 May 2019 in Moscow.
