= Aleksey Kuznetsov (skier) =

Soviet skier (1929–2003)

Medal record

Men's cross country skiing

Representing Soviet Union

Olympic Games
Bronze medal – third place	1960 Squaw Valley	4 x 10 km

World Championships
Silver medal – second place	1954 Falun	4 x 10 km
Bronze medal – third place	1962 Zakopane	4 x 10 km

Aleksey Ivanovich Kuznetsov (Russian: Алексéй Ивáнович Кузнецóв; 15 August 1929 – 28 March 2003) was a former Soviet cross-country skier who competed during the 1950s and 1960s, training in Gorodets at VSS Urozhai. He earned a bronze medal in the 4 x 10 km relay at the 1960 Winter Olympics in Squaw Valley. He won two medals in the 4 x 10 km relay at the Nordic skiing World Championships with a silver in 1954 and a bronze 1962.
