= Eugene Grazia =

American ice hockey player

Medal record

Men's ice hockey

Representing United States

Olympic Games
Gold medal – first place	1960 Squaw Valley	Team competition

Eugene Grazia (July 29, 1934 – November 9, 2014) was an American ice hockey player. He won a gold medal at the 1960 Winter Olympics. He was born in West Springfield, Massachusetts.
