= Viktor Kosichkin =

Soviet speed skater

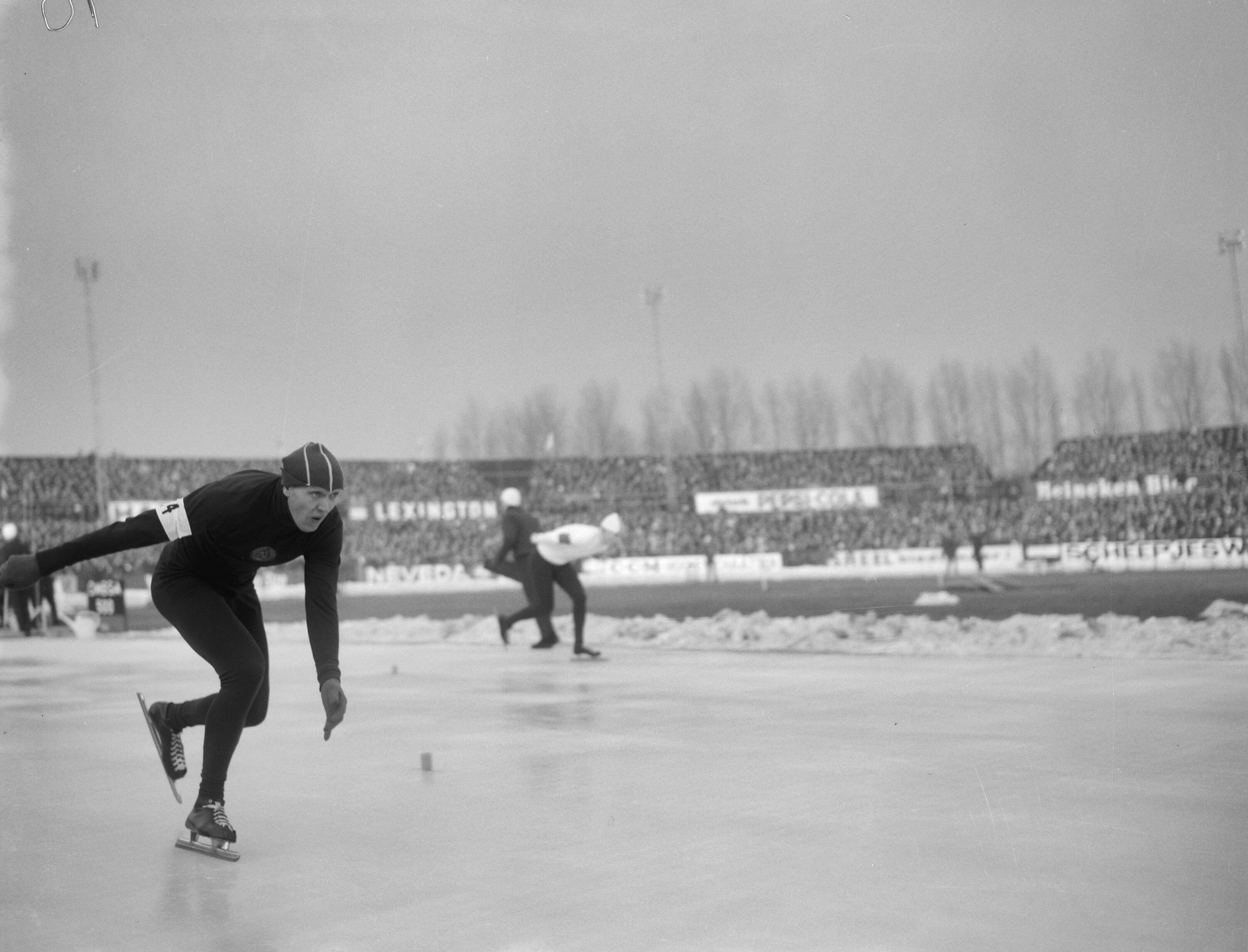
- Viktor Kosichkin in black suit and white armband at 1966 European Allround.

Personal information
- Nationality: Russian
- Born: Viktor Ivanovich Kosichkin; February 25, 1938 Rybnovsky District, Ryazan Oblast, RSFSR, Soviet Union
- Died: March 30, 2012 (aged 74) Moscow, Russia
- Height: 1.85 m (6 ft 1 in)
- Weight: 80 kg (176 lb)

Sport
- Country: Soviet Union
- Sport: Speed skating

Achievements and titles
- Personal best(s): 500 m: 41.9 (1965); 1500 m: 2:10.7 (1965); 3000 m: 4:29.6 (1964); 5000 m: 7:42.3 (1965); 10 000 m: 15:49.2 (1960)
Medal record
Representing Soviet Union
Men's speed skating
Gold medal – first place	1960 Squaw Valley	5000 m
Silver medal – second place	1960 Squaw Valley	10000 m

Viktor Ivanovich Kosichkin (Russian: Виктор Иванович Косичкин; 25 February 1938 – 30 March 2012) was a speed skater who competed for the Soviet Union.

Kosichkin trained at Dynamo. He participated in the 1960 Winter Olympics in Squaw Valley. On the 5000 m, held on his 22nd birthday, he won gold, while the silver medal went to his major rival, Knut Johannesen. On the 10000 m two days later, the roles were reversed, with Johannesen winning gold and Kosichkin silver.

The next year (1961), Kosichkin became Soviet and European Allround Champion, while winning silver at the World Allround Championships (behind Henk van der Grift). In 1962 he was not selected to be on the Soviet team for the European Championships and he damaged his skates in anger. His friend Yevgeny Grishin gave him an old pair of skates and Kosichkin became World Champion on these.

1963 was not a good year for Kosichkin, winning no major medals and finishing only 15th at the Soviet Allround Championships. In 1964, he once more won silver behind Johannesen at the World Allround Championships. He also participated in the 5000 m and the 10000 m at the 1964 Winter Olympics of Innsbruck, but he did not win any medals.

He was Soviet Champion on the 5000 m in 1958, 1960, 1961 and 1962, and on the 10000 m in 1960, 1961, 1962, 1964 and 1965. Kosichkin's highest ranking on the Adelskalender, the all-time allround speed skating ranking, was a third place.

== Medals ==
An overview of medals won by Kosichkin at important championships, listing the years in which he won each:

Championships	Gold medal	Silver medal	Bronze medal
Winter Olympics	1960 (5000 m)	1960 (10000 m)	–
World Allround	1962	1961; 1964	–
European Allround	1961	–	1965
Soviet Allround	1961	1962; 1964	1965
