= Leonid Fyodorov =

Soviet ski jumper (1928–1993)

Personal information
- Nationality: Soviet
- Born: 25 March 1928
- Died: 1993 (aged 64–65)

Sport
- Sport: Ski jumping

Leonid Fyodorov (25 March 1928 – 1993) was a Soviet skier (ski jumping and Nordic combined), and coach. He competed at the 1956 Winter Olympics and the 1960 Winter Olympics.
