= Peter Parrott (ice hockey) =

Australian ice hockey player

Personal information
- Nationality: Australian
- Born: 27 May 1936 (age 88)

Sport
- Sport: Ice hockey

Peter Parrott (born 27 May 1936) is an Australian ice hockey player. He competed in the men's tournament at the 1960 Winter Olympics.
