= Hans Huber (ice hockey) =

German ice hockey player

Personal information
- Nationality: German
- Born: 10 December 1929; Rosenheim, Germany
- Died: 28 January 2014 (aged 84); Ismaning, Germany

Sport
- Sport: Ice hockey

Johannes Huber (10 December 1929 — 28 January 2014) was a German ice hockey player. He competed in the men's tournaments at the 1956 Winter Olympics and the 1960 Winter Olympics.
