= Anatoly Shelyukhin =

Medal record

Men's cross-country skiing

Representing Soviet Union

Olympic Games
Bronze medal – third place	1960 Squaw Valley	4 x 10 km

World Championships
Silver medal – second place	1958 Lahti	4 x 10 km
Bronze medal – third place	1958 Lahti	15 km

Anatoly Ivanovich Shelyukhin (Russian: Анато́лий Ива́нович Шелю́хин; June 15, 1930 – October 21, 1995) was a Soviet cross-country skier who competed during the late 1950s and early 1960s, training at VSS Trud in Kostroma. He earned a bronze medal in the 4x10 km relay at the 1960 Winter Olympics in Squaw Valley. He won two medals at the 1958 Nordic skiing World Championships with a silver in the 4x10 km relay and a bronze in the 15 km. He was born in Kostroma.
