= Matti Lampainen =

Finnish ice hockey player (born 1932)

Matti Veikko Lampainen (born January 16, 1932) is a retired professional ice hockey player who played in the SM-liiga. He was born in Kanneljärvi, Finland (now Pobeda, Leningrad Oblast, Russia). He played for Tappara and Ilves. He was inducted into the Finnish Hockey Hall of Fame in 1985.
