= Esko Niemi =

Finnish ice hockey player

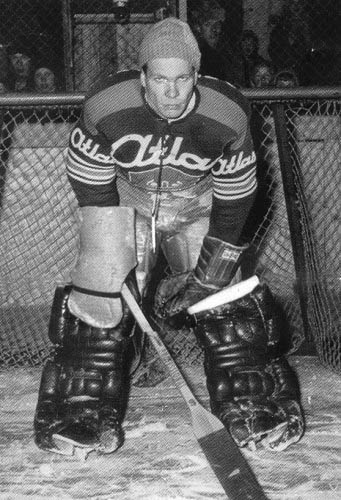
- Born: June 11, 1934 Tampere, Finland
- Died: November 8, 2013 (aged 79) Tampere, Finland
- Height: 5 ft 9 in (175 cm)
- Weight: 190 lb (86 kg; 13 st 8 lb)
- Position: Goaltender
- Caught: Left
- National team: Finland
- Playing career: 1952–1964

Esko Ilmari Niemi (11 June 1934 in Tampere, Finland – 8 November 2013) was a professional ice hockey player who played in the SM-liiga. He played for Tappara and TPS. He was inducted into the Finnish Hockey Hall of Fame in 1985.
