= Boris Stenin =

Soviet speed skater (1935–2001)

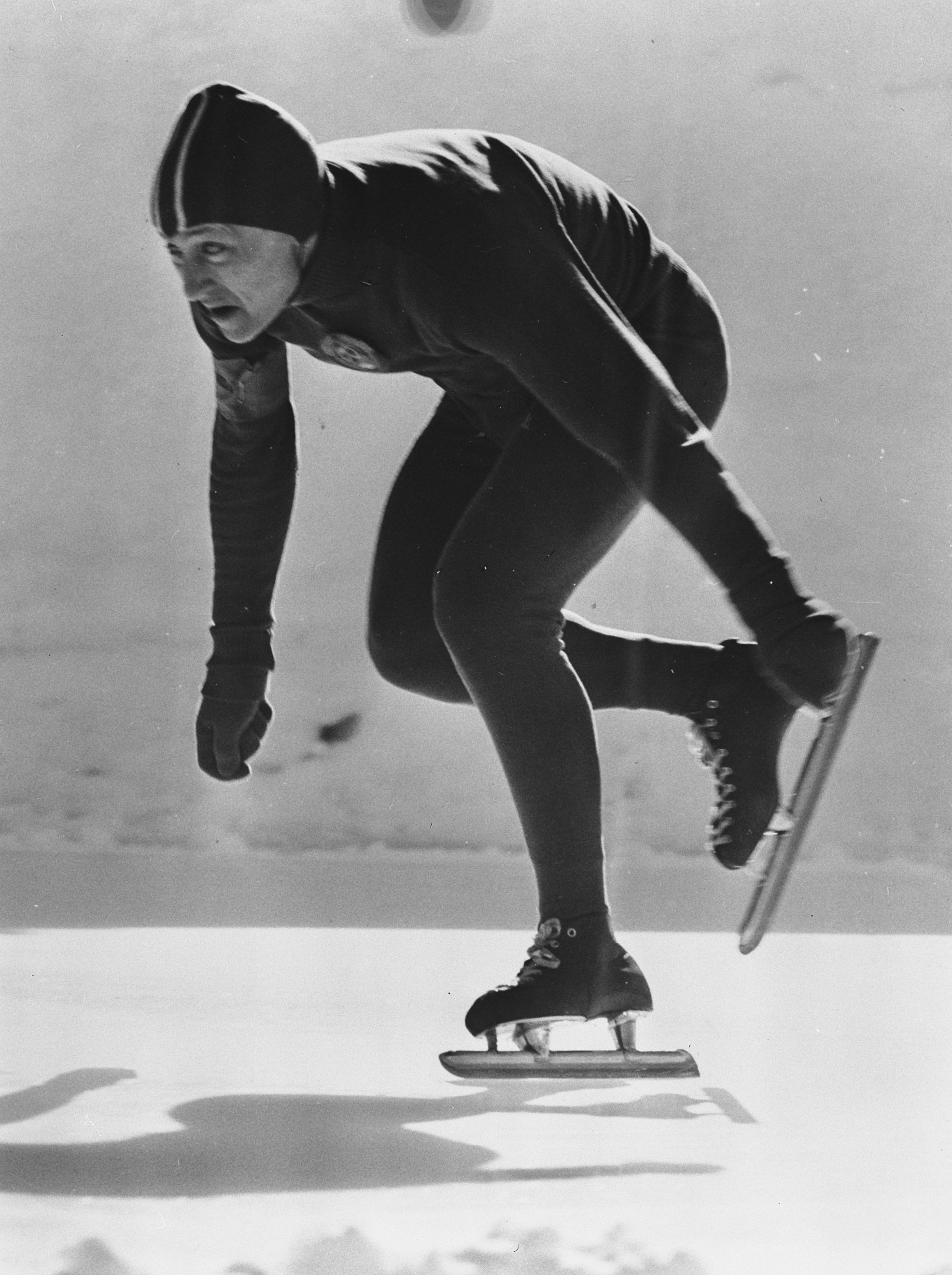
- Stenin at the 1960 World Cup in Davos

Personal information
- Born: 17 January 1935 Arti, Sverdlovsk Oblast, Russian SFSR, Soviet Union
- Died: 18 January 2001 (aged 66) Moscow, Russia
Medal record
Men's Speed Skating
Representing Soviet Union
Olympic Games
Bronze medal – third place	1960 Squaw Valley	1,500 m
World Championships
Gold medal – first place	1960 Davos	Allround
European Championships
Silver medal – second place	1960 Oslo	Allround
Bronze medal – third place	1962 Oslo	Allround

Boris Andrianovich Stenin (Russian: Борис Андрианович Стенин; 17 January 1935 – 18 January 2001) was a Soviet speed skater, speed skating coach, and speed skating scientist.

Living in Sverdlovsk, Stenin met and married fellow skater Valentina Stenina (Valentina Miloslavova before their marriage) during the early days of his speed skating career. They would remain married until Stenin's death in 2001, more than 40 years later.

== Career ==
=== As speed skater ===
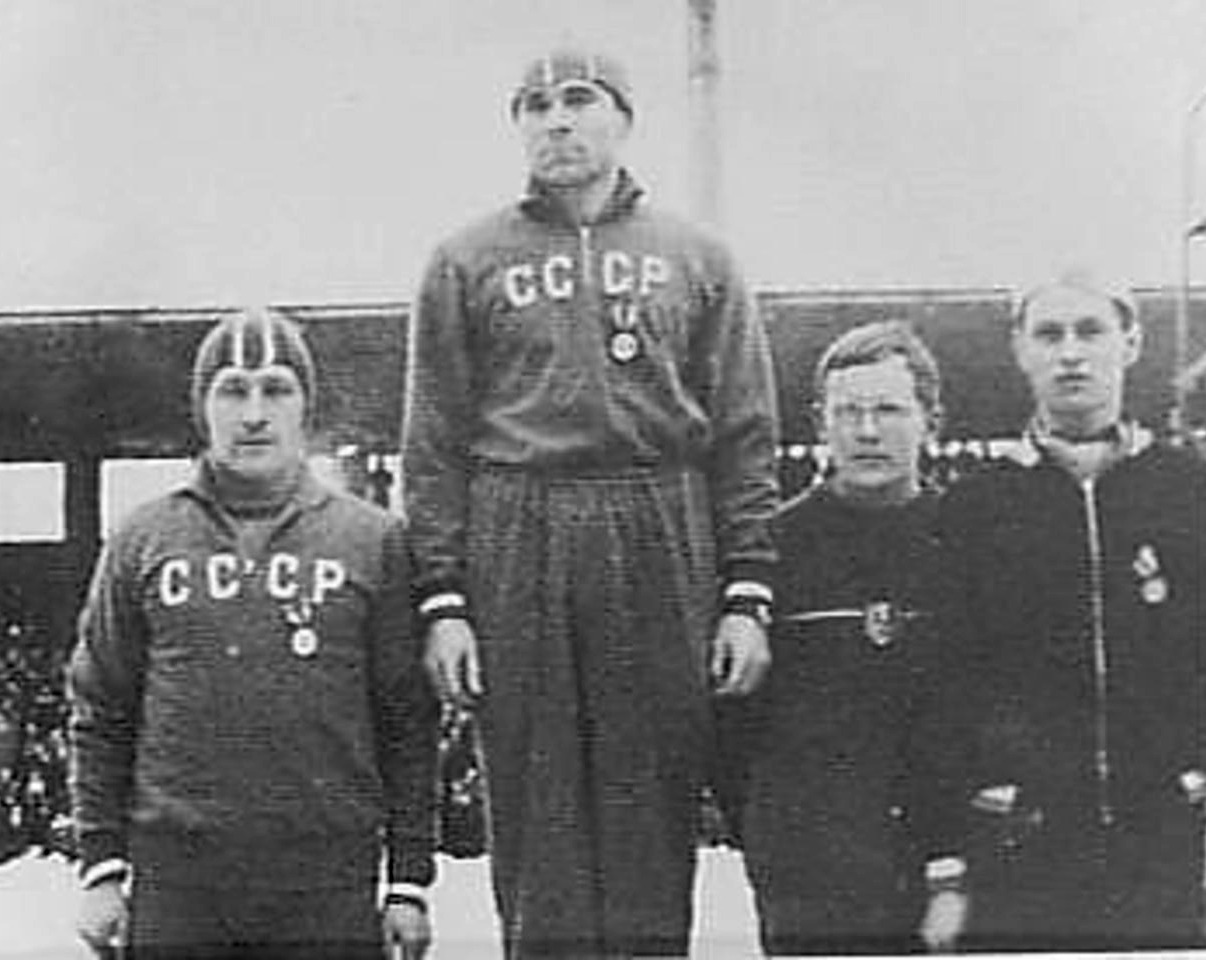
Stenin (left, silver medal) at the podium of the 1962 European Championship in Oslo

Stenin trained at VSS Trud ('Labour') in Sverdlovsk. Having been selected for the Soviet national team in 1957, Stenin steadily made progress and after a few international competitions in 1958 and 1959, he had a great year in 1960: He became Soviet Allround Champion, then he won silver at the European Allround Championships, then his wife Valentina became World Allround Champion, then he himself became World Allround Champion (with a rather large margin of 2.758 points over the second place score), and then at the 1960 Winter Olympics in Squaw Valley, he won bronze on the 1,500 m, while Valentina won silver on the 3,000 m. For his accomplishments he received the 1960 Oscar Mathisen Award.

1961 brought few major results for Stenin, but in 1962, he won gold at the Soviet National Allround Championships and bronze at the European Championships (in which he won one distance, the 1,500 m). Two weeks later, at the World Championships, he was in first place after three distances (with reigning World Champion Henk van der Grift in second place), but a 14th place on the final distance (the 10,000 m) made him end the World Championships in fourth place.

In 1963, Stenin became Soviet Allround Champion for the third and last time. Meanwhile, the Norwegian top skaters had increased their training loads significantly – using new methods introduced by coach Stein Johnson – and the results showed at the European Championships that year: Stenin finished fifth behind four Norwegian skaters (Nils Aaness, Knut Johannesen, Per Ivar Moe, and Magne Thomassen). Having analysed the Norwegian methods, Stenin started training harder, but he over-trained and injured himself. As a result, he was not selected for the Soviet Olympic team. This marked the end of Stenin's speed skating career and the start of his career as a coach.

==== Medals ====
An overview of medals won by Stenin at important championships he participated in, listing the years in which he won each:

Championships	Gold medal	Silver medal	Bronze medal
Winter Olympics			1960 (1,500 m)
World Allround	1960		
European Allround		1960	1962
Soviet Allround	1960; 1962; 1963		1961

=== As speed skating coach ===
In 1964, at the age of 29, Stenin started to work as the speed skating coach for the local team of Sverdlovsk. Within two years, the team of Sverdlovsk became the champion of the Spartakiad of the Peoples of the USSR and Stenin was invited to become one of the coaches of the Soviet national team. Despite having studied the world's best speed skaters in recent years, Stenin still did not have extensive practical knowledge and after the 1968 Winter Olympics in Grenoble, he went to work at an institute for Physical Education. During his years there as a post-graduate student and a teacher, Stenin published a book in which he scientifically analysed how the top speed skaters train and how this affects them physiologically.

In 1973, Stenin was invited to be a coach for the national women's team – this time with a lot more influence and responsibility than he had had during his previous work as a coach for the national team. The Soviet women at the time had been winning a lot less than they had in recent times before, but training with Stenin as their coach, skaters such as Tatyana Averina, Vera Bryndzei, Natalya Petrusyova, Nina Statkevich, Galina Stepanskaya, and several others soon started producing results, and during the next ten years, many world records holders, Olympic Champions, World Champions, European Champions, and various other major accomplishers were female Soviet skaters. Stenin's rigorous training schedule and alternating between altitude training and indoor training resulted in improvements. But when the Soviet women team won "only" three bronze medals (two by Natalya Petrusyova and one by Natalya Glebova) at the 1984 Winter Olympics in Sarajevo, Stenin was fired.

=== As scientist ===
Returning to the institute for Physical Education where he had worked before, Stenin took up his scientific and teaching work again and became head of the speed skating department at the institute. From 1984 onwards, Stenin published many works on speed skating, took part in many scientific conferences, and he earned a Ph.D. degree in 1994. He continued his scientific and teaching work in speed skating until his death in 2001.

Stenin published more than 60 scientific works and won many awards. At the time of his death, he was a member of the technical committee of the International Skating Union, as well as holding several other positions.

Awards
Preceded by (Norway) Knut Johannesen	Oscar Mathisen Award; 1960	Succeeded by (Netherlands) Henk van der Grift
