= Heino Pulli =

Finnish ice hockey player

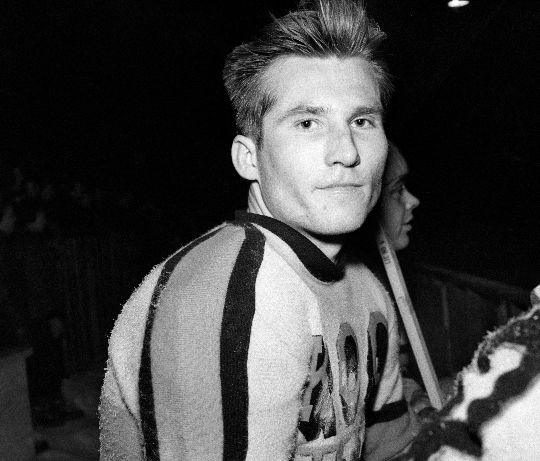
- Heino Pulli in 1958.
- Born: March 22, 1938 Sortavala, Finland
- Died: April 11, 2015 (aged 77)
- Position: Centre
- Shot: Left
- Played for: TK-V/KOOVEE
- National team: Finland
- Playing career: 1953–1968

Heino Vihtori Pulli (March 22, 1938 – April 11, 2015) was a Finnish ice hockey player who played in the SM-sarja. Born in Sortavala, Finland, he played for TK-V who later became KOOVEE. He was inducted into the Finnish Hockey Hall of Fame in 1994.

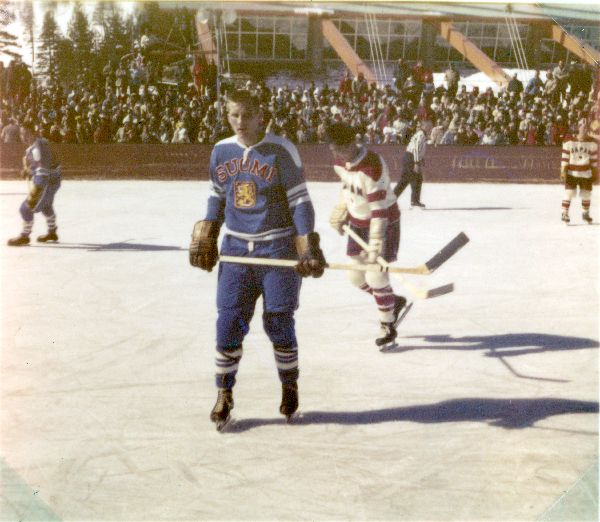
Heino Pulli on the Squaw Valley 1960 Winter Olympics
