= John Nicholas (ice hockey) =

Australian ice hockey player

Personal information
- Full name: John Allen Nicholas
- Nationality: Australian
- Born: 2 May 1930 Melbourne, Australia
- Died: 1966 (aged 35–36) Melbourne, Australia

Sport
- Sport: Ice hockey

John Allen Nicholas (2 May 1930 – 1966) was an Australian ice hockey player. He competed in the men's tournament at the 1960 Winter Olympics.
