= Lawrence Palmer =

American ice hockey player (born 1938)

Personal information
- Born: January 7, 1938 (age 88) Malden, Massachusetts, U.S.
Medal record
Men's ice hockey
Representing the United States
Olympic Games
Gold medal – first place	1960 Squaw Valley	Team competition

Lawrence "Larry" Palmer (born January 7, 1938) is an American former ice hockey goaltender. He also attended the United States Military Academy and played ice hockey with the Army Black Knights from 1956 to 1959 before joining the 1960 U.S. Olympic Team with Jack Riley, the head coach of the United States Olympic team. He won a gold medal at the 1960 Winter Olympics.
