= Speed skating at the 1960 Winter Olympics =

Speed skating at the VIII Olympic Winter Games
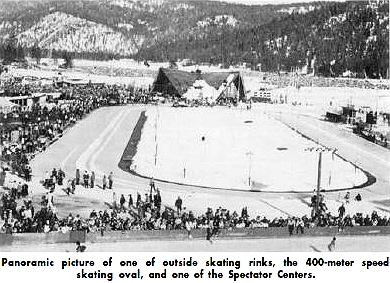
- Squaw Valley Olympic Skating Rink in 1960
- Venue: Squaw Valley Olympic Skating Rink
- Date: 20–27 February 1960
- No. of events: 8
- Competitors: 103 from 17 nations

At the 1960 Winter Olympics, eight speed skating events were contested in Squaw Valley, California. For the first time in Olympic history, women participated in the Olympic speed skating events after the USOC's proposal to include the women's events was approved by the IOC. The competitions were held from Saturday, February 20, to Tuesday, February 23, 1960 (women), and from Wednesday, February 24, to Saturday, February 27, 1960 (men).

== Medal summary ==
=== Men ===
Event	Gold		Silver		Bronze	
500 metres	Yevgeny Grishin; Soviet Union	40.2 =WR	Bill Disney; United States	40.3	Rafayel Grach; Soviet Union	40.4
1500 metres	Roald Aas; Norway; Yevgeny Grishin; Soviet Union	2:10.4	not awarded as there was a tie for gold		Boris Stenin; Soviet Union	2:11.5
5000 metres	Viktor Kosichkin; Soviet Union	7:51.3	Knut Johannesen; Norway	8:00.8	Jan Pesman; Netherlands	8:05.1
10,000 metres	Knut Johannesen; Norway	15:46.6 WR	Viktor Kosichkin; Soviet Union	15:49.2	Kjell Bäckman; Sweden	16:14.2

=== Women ===
Event	Gold		Silver		Bronze	
500 metres	Helga Haase; United Team of Germany	45.9	Natalya Donchenko; Soviet Union	46.0	Jeanne Ashworth; United States	46.1
1000 metres	Klara Guseva; Soviet Union	1:34.1	Helga Haase; United Team of Germany	1:34.3	Tamara Rylova; Soviet Union	1:34.8
1500 metres	Lidiya Skoblikova; Soviet Union	2:25.2 WR	Elwira Seroczyńska; Poland	2:25.7	Helena Pilejczyk; Poland	2:27.1
3000 metres	Lidiya Skoblikova; Soviet Union	5:14.3	Valentina Stenina; Soviet Union	5:16.9	Eevi Huttunen; Finland	5:21.0

== Participating nations ==
104 Athletes from seventeen nations competed in the speed skating events at Squaw Valley. Out of 249 entries, 8 did not finish and 1 got disqualified.

- Australia (2men)
- Austria (2m)
- Canada (3m + 2w)
- Denmark (1m)
- Finland (5m + 2w)
- France (2m + 1w)
- United Team of Germany (7m + 5w)
- Great Britain (2m)
- Italy (3m)
- Japan (5m + 3w)
- South Korea (3m + 2w)
- Netherlands (5m)
- Norway (7m)
- Poland (2w)
- Soviet Union (11m + 5w)
- Sweden (7m + 2w)
- United States (9m + 6w)

== Medal table ==
Rank	Nation	Gold	Silver	Bronze	Total
1	Soviet Union	6	3	3	12
2	Norway	2	1	0	3
3	United Team of Germany	1	1	0	2
4	Poland	0	1	1	2
4	United States	0	1	1	2
6	Finland	0	0	1	1
6	Netherlands	0	0	1	1
6	Sweden	0	0	1	1
Totals (8 entries)		9	7	8	24
