= Fred Etcher =

Canadian ice hockey player

Olympic medal record

Men's Ice hockey

Representing Canada
| Silver medal – second place | 1960 Squaw Valley | Ice hockey |

Frederick Keith Etcher (August 23, 1932 – November 25, 2011) was a Canadian ice hockey left winger who competed in the 1960 Winter Olympics. He was born in Oshawa, Ontario.

Etcher won the silver medal at the 1960 Winter Olympics in ice hockey.

He played for Oshawa Generals. Etcher played 102 matches in the Ontario Hockey Association.

Etcher was a member of the Church of Jesus Christ of Latter-day Saints. This fact was often noted in contemporary news accounts of his hockey career.
