= Natalya Donchenko =

Soviet speed skater (1932–2022)

- Natalya Sergeyevna Donchenko
- Born: 25 August 1932; Moscow, Russian SSR, Soviet Union
- Died: 11 July 2022 (aged 89); Nizhny Novgorod, Russia
- Occupations: French teacher and skater

Natalya Donchenko
Medal record

Representing Soviet Union

Women's speed skating

Olympic Games
Silver medal – second place	1960 Squaw Valley	500 m

Natalya Sergeyevna Donchenko (Russian: Наталья Серге́евна Донченко; 25 August 1932 – 11 July 2022) was the first female Soviet speed skater to win an Olympic medal. She had taught herself to skate on an abandoned rink during World War two. She was spotted and asked to join a skating team. She said her most proud moment was to win in 1945 but her Olympic Silver medal in California was her greatest achievement.

== Life ==
Donchenko was brought up in Gorky after her father was arrested when she was a child and they never saw him again. During the war she was living by an ice rink and the fencing was taken down to be used elsewhere and she and others played on the ice while the athletes raced past them. The athletes noticed her skills and asked her to join them. In 1945 she competed and won for the first time. She remembered this as her biggest triumph.

In 1952 she won the USSR 500m speed skating race at the Medeu ice rink near Alma-Ata in Kazakhstan while she was a student at the Gorky Institute of Foreign Languages. She became a French teacher. In 1957 she married her trainer and had a son. She retrained and by January 1958 she was back in the team.

When she competed at the Olympics in "Squaw Valley" in California her husband had to stay at home. He was surprised that she lost the gold medal by only a tenth of a second but he knew her achievement was outstanding. She did compete in the 1960 World Championship and she was placed fourth. Donchenko was an avid Russian athlete who participated in countless championships nationwide. She only retired from sport in her late 70s.

== Personal records ==
Event	Result	Year
500 m	46.0	1960
1,000 m	1.35.6	1962
1,500 m	2.27.9	1962
3,000 m	5.22.6	1962

== Olympic results ==
Event	Result	Date	Venue
500 m	46.0	20 February 1960	Squaw Valley
