= Harold Hurley =

Canadian ice hockey player

Medal record

Men's ice hockey

Representing Canada

Olympic Games
Silver medal – second place	1960 Squaw Valley	Team competition

Harold Anthony "Boat" Hurley (November 16, 1929 – August 29, 2017) was a Canadian ice hockey goaltender who competed in the 1960 Winter Olympics.

Born in Stratford, Ontario, he won the silver medal at the 1960 Winter Olympics in ice hockey. He played for such teams as the Kitchener-Waterloo Dutchmen, Buffalo Bisons, and Guelph Regals. He played one match in the American Hockey League. In his final season of senior amateur hockey, Hurley was the goaltender for the 1970-71 Galt Hornets--a team that won the Allan Cup.

Hurley was a longtime employee of Bauer Industries Ltd., a company that manufactured padding for automobiles.

Hurley died in Kitchener, Ontario, on August 29, 2017, aged 87.
