= Bob Attersley =

Canadian ice hockey player

- Born: August 13, 1933 Oshawa, Ontario, Canada
- Died: March 12, 2010 (aged 76) Ajax, Ontario, Canada
- Height: 5 ft 10 in (178 cm)
- Weight: 165 lb (75 kg; 11 st 11 lb)
- Position: Centre
- Shot: Left
- Played for: Oshawa Generals; Guelph Biltmores; Whitby Dunlops; Hull-Ottawa Canadiens; Kingston Frontenacs
- National team: Canada
- NHL draft: Undrafted
- Playing career: 1951–1963

Olympic medal record

Men's Ice hockey

Representing Canada
Silver medal – second place	1960 Squaw Valley	Ice hockey

Robert Alan Attersley (August 13, 1933 – March 12, 2010) was a well known Canadian ice hockey player who competed in the 1960 Winter Olympics. He was born in Oshawa, Ontario, to Ernest and Doris Kilburn Attersley.During his lifetime he owned and operated several businesses and had a political career which extended to being the mayor of Whitby.

== Early life ==
He was first employed by General Motors, and also held the position of president of the Young Conservative Party of Oshawa. He subsequently moved to Whitby.

== Hockey career ==
Attersley played on bantam and midget hockey teams in Oshawa and then proceeded onto Junior B. Eventually reaching Major Junior 'A' hockey in 1950-1951, he first played for the Oshawa Generals. He remained with the Generals for a total of three seasons, receiving the Red Tilson Trophy as the Ontario Hockey League's most valuable player in 1952-1953. In hopes of signing him, he was invited by the Boston Bruins to their training camp at Hershey, Pennsylvania in 1953.

While considering the offer made by Boston, the Generals lost their arena to a fire. This fire not only took their home, but all their equipment as well. This forced the team to split up, names were put into a hat and divided between the remaining teams. This landed Attersley with the Guelph Biltmores for a year at the same fee offered by Boston. Other than playing exhibition games with the Bruins he remained with the Guelph Biltmores.

With the contract to the Guelph Biltmores coming to an end, Attersley joined the team the Oshawa Truckmen. Because of the loss of the Oshawa arena, the 1953-1954 season was played in Bowmanville. At this point Attersley made his way back to Whitby with the then Oshawa Truckmen, which changed its name to the Whitby Dunlops.

With his centre position secured for the Whitby Dunlops, Attersley went on to win the scoring championship in the league for four of the five seasons. In 1956-1957, he went on to win the Allan Cup with the Whitby Dunlops in their first year as a Senior "A" club. He also managed to set two records during his time with the Dunlops. A record of 70 assists in the 1956-1957 season and in 1958-1959 a record for total points at the end of a season, 95.

In 1958 he earned the right to represent Canada at the World Hockey Championships in Oslo, Norway with the Dunlops. In the final game, Attersley scored two goals and one assist.

In the 1958-1959 season, the Whitby Dunlops won the Allan Cup. In the following year the Whitby Dunlops disbanded, leaving Attersley to join the Waterloo Flying Dutchmen to represent Canada for a second time. This time it was at the 1960 Winter Olympics at Squaw Valley, California. Following the Olympics Attersley went on to join the Kingston Frontenacs of the Eastern Professional Hockey League, until leaving hockey in 1962.

=== Recognition ===
He received two major forms of recognition for his many years playing hockey. On August 14, 1981, the Whitby Dunlops were inducted into the Hockey Hall of Fame in Toronto. Attersley's and Harry Sinden's sweaters were placed in a glass case as part of a display of World Championship teams Canada has produced since the Second World War. In 1986 Attersley was also recognized for his years with the Generals, when he was inducted into the Oshawa Sports Hall of Fame.

=== Return to hockey ===
Attersley returned to hockey in 1989 when, along with Wren Blair, he purchased the then Kingston Raiders. The new owners kept the team in Kingston and restored the old Frontenacs name.

== Business career ==
After working for General Motors, Attersley became supervisor of maintenance at the new Dunlop Tire plant towards the end of 1954. On April 1, 1960 he opened his first Attersley Tire store and expanded into the commercial truck area of expertise by the year 1964. He continued to expand himself across many areas of commerce and in 1981, and was recognized by the Whitby Chamber of Commerce naming him "Business Person of the Year."

== Political career ==
Attersley's political career began to 1964 when he was first elected to the town council of Whitby. He served as a councillor from January 1964 until August 1966 when the reeve of Whitby, Everett Quantrill, resigned. At that point the deputy reeve George Brooks took his place and Attersley took over as deputy reeve and finance committee chairman. He stayed in those positions until the end of 1969 when he retired from council. He returned to council from 1971 to 1973 following the resignation of Hugh O'Connell, and again in 1977. In this latter term, he also served on Durham Regional Council.

=== Mayor ===
In November 1980, Attersley ran for mayor unchallenged. In his first year as mayor, Attersley faced a large challenge when in the summer of 1980 one of Whitby's largest industries, Firestone, had closed bringing with it a loss of 650 jobs and $65,000 in taxes.

Another duty that Attersley assumed as mayor in 1980 was to serve as one of the Regional Council's representatives on the then named Durham Police Commission. He spent a total of 11 years on the commission, nine as chairman (1983–1991), unchallenged for each of those years. While on the Durham Police Commission he was responsible for the introduction of the Crime Stoppers program into Whitby. He took a major role in modernizing police equipment and introducing a computer system.

A major goal of Attersley's as mayor was to increase commerce in Whitby. He realized tourist promotion to be a necessity for the welfare of Whitby and established a temporary Tourist Information Centre. On June 29, 1982, a permanent Tourist Information Centre was opened with financial assistance from Len Cullen, owner of Cullen Gardens. In an attempt to increase industrialism, brochures were made up in English, French, German and Japanese to promote Whitby. In times of a recession for Ontario, Whitby posted record numbers for building permits, industries and stores being opened, and a population increase.

In July 1982, Attersley ran, again unchallenged, for a second term as mayor. Whitby received global attention when it was visited by 15 Japanese mayors on July 9, 1984. It was the only Canadian stop by the mayors, who wanted to see how a town like Whitby operated.

On August 25, 1984, Attersley presented Anne Ottenbrite with the Key to the Town of Whitby and named a swimming pool in her honour. He also later unveiled a plaque at Camp X in memory of Sir William Stephenson.

Attersley served as mayor until the 1991 municipal election.

Attersley was appointed Honorary Colonel of The Ontario Regiment in July 2001.
