= James Connelly (ice hockey) =

Canadian former ice hockey right winger

Jim Connelly
Personal information
- Born: James Connelly; October 7, 1932 (age 93) South Porcupine, Ontario, Canada

Sport
- Sport: Ice hockey
- Team: Waterloo Hurricanes; Guelph Biltmores
Medal record
Men's Ice hockey
Representing Canada
Silver medal – second place	1960 Squaw Valley	Ice hockey

James "Jim" Connelly (born October 7, 1932) is a Canadian former ice hockey right winger who competed in the 1960 Winter Olympics, scoring five goals and eight points in seven games.

== Career ==
He played for the Waterloo Hurricanes and Guelph Biltmores. Connelly played 104 games in the Ontario Hockey Association. He played with 52 Guelph Biltmores, who won the Memorial Cup. In 1960, he played in the Allan Cup-winning Senior Canadian Championship.
