= Viktor Pryazhnikov =

Russian ice hockey player

Viktor Romanovich Pryazhnikov (Russian: Виктор Романович Пряжников, 23 December 1933 in Elektrostal, Soviet Union – 17 April 2008 in Moscow, Russia), was a Russian ice hockey player. During his career he played for Krylya Sovetov Moscow and the Soviet Hockey League where he scored 166 goals in 400 matches, and was called to the Soviet national team. On 9 January 1955 he played against Sweden, and in 1960 he won a bronze medal in the Winter Olympics. He was inducted into the Russian and Soviet Hockey Hall of Fame in 1991.
