= Konstantin Loktev =

Russian ice hockey player (1933–1996)

Olympic medal record

Men's Ice hockey

Representing Soviet Union
Bronze medal – third place	1960 Squaw Valley	Ice hockey
Gold medal – first place	1964 Innsbruck	Ice hockey

Konstantin Borisovich Loktev (April 16, 1933 – November 4, 1996) was a Soviet ice hockey player who played in the Soviet Hockey League. He played for HC CSKA Moscow. He was inducted into the Russian and Soviet Hockey Hall of Fame in 1964. He was born and died in Moscow.

Loktev was the coach of CSKA Moscow when the team played the Super Series '76 against teams in the National Hockey League (NHL). CSKA won against the Boston Bruins and New York Rangers, tied the Montreal Canadiens (who would go on to win the 1976 Stanley Cup) and lost to the Philadelphia Flyers. The loss to the Flyers gained extra notoriety when, during the first period, Loktev pulled the team off the ice after Flyers defenceman Ed Van Impe delivered a body check to Valeri Kharlamov that Loktev felt should have been penalized. After a delay, the team returned to the ice and played out the game.

Loktev was inducted into the IIHF Hall of Fame in 2007.

== Career statistics ==
=== International ===
Year	Team	Event	GP	G	A	Pts	PIM
1957	Soviet Union	WC	7	11	7	18	—
1958	Soviet Union	WC	7	7	4	11	4
1959	Soviet Union	WC	8	3	—	—	—
1960	Soviet Union	OLY	6	6	2	8	8
1961	Soviet Union	WC	7	5	4	9	6
1964	Soviet Union	OLY	8	6	9	15	8
1965	Soviet Union	WC	7	7	4	11	6
1966	Soviet Union	WC	7	5	5	10	4
Senior totals			57	50	35	88	36
