= Alfred Kuchevsky =

- Born: 17 May 1931 Moscow, Russian SFSR, Soviet Union
- Died: May 15, 2000 (aged 68) Moscow, Russia
- Height: 5 ft 11 in (180 cm)
- Weight: 175 lb (79 kg; 12 st 7 lb)
- Position: Defence
- Shot: Left
- Played for: Krylya Sovetov Moscow
- National team: Soviet Union
- Playing career: 1949–1961
Medal record
Olympic Games
Gold medal – first place	1956 Cortina	Team
Bronze medal – third place	1960 Squaw Valley	Team
World Championships
Gold medal – first place	1954 Stockholm	Team
Silver medal – second place	1955 West Germany	Team
Silver medal – second place	1958 Oslo	Team

Alfred Iosifovich Kuchevsky (Russian: Альфред Иосифович Кучевский; 17 May 1931 – 15 May 2000) was a Soviet professional ice hockey defenceman. He played for the HC Krylya Sovetov Moscow of the Soviet Championship League and represented the Soviet Union national ice hockey team in international competitions. He was Olympic champion in 1956, won an Olympic bronze medal in 1960, was world champion in 1954, and won silver medals at the world championships in 1955 and 1958.

== Biography ==
Kuchevsky was born on 17 May 1931 in Moscow, Soviet Union. His father worked as Director of the Krylya Sovetov Stadium near the metro station Semyonovskaya.

He attended Moscow School No. 429.

While playing for the Krylya Sovetov Moscow in 1949–61, he won the USSR Cup in 1951, was a runner-up twice (1952, 1954), and became the national ice hockey champion in 1957, earning silver three times (1955, 1956, 1958), and bronze five times (1950, 1951, 1954, 1959, 1960). He played 240 matches at the USSR championships, scored 37 goals.

After finishing his career as player, he worked at the Krylya Sovetov Moscow until 1972, starting as an assistant coach at his hockey club for four seasons, then managing a sports school. At one time, he served as a hockey referee and sports journalist. Following his complete retirement from hockey, he was responsible for organizing the first sports lotteries in the Soviet Union.

In 1954, he was awarded the title Honoured Master of Sports of the USSR in ice hockey, which holders are unofficially known as inductees of the Russian and Soviet Hockey Hall of Fame.

He was awarded the Medal "For Labour Valour" in 1957, and the Order of Friendship in 1996.

On 15 May 2000, he died in Moscow and later was buried at the Troyekurovskoye Cemetery.

In 2011, Alfred Kuchevsky was posthumously inducted into the International Jewish Sports Hall of Fame.

== See also ==
- List of select Jewish ice hockey players
