= Veniamin Alexandrov =

Soviet ice hockey player (1937–1991)

Olympic medal record

Men's Ice hockey

Representing Soviet Union
Bronze medal – third place	1960 Squaw Valley	Ice hockey
Gold medal – first place	1964 Innsbruck	Ice hockey
Gold medal – first place	1968 Grenoble	Ice hockey

World championships
Silver medal – second place	1957 Moscow	Team
Silver medal – second place	1958 Oslo	Team
Silver medal – second place	1959 Prague	Team
Bronze medal – third place	1960 Squaw Valley	Team
Bronze medal – third place	1961 Switzerland	Team
Gold medal – first place	1963 Stockholm	Team
Gold medal – first place	1964 Innsbruck	Team
Gold medal – first place	1965 Tampere	Team
Gold medal – first place	1966 Ljubljana	Team
Gold medal – first place	1967 Vienna	Team
Gold medal – first place	1968 Grenoble	Team

Veniamin Veniaminovich Alexandrov (Russian: Вениамин Вениаминович Александров; 18 April 1937 – 6 November 1991) was a Soviet ice hockey player who played in the Soviet Hockey League. He played for CSKA Moscow. He was inducted into the Russian and Soviet Hockey Hall of Fame in 1963. After playing exhibition matches in North America in 1957, Alexandrov was put on the negotiation list of the Chicago Black Hawks, a team in the National Hockey League. While Soviet players were not expected to be able to move to North America, Chicago still felt highly enough of him to do so in the event that changed. He was inducted into the IIHF Hall of Fame in 2007.

During the 1962-63 Soviet League season he led all scorers with 53 goals.

== Career statistics ==
=== Regular season ===
			Regular season
Season	Team	League	GP	G	A	Pts	PIM
1955-56	CSK MO Moscow	Soviet	—	18	—	—	—
1956-57	CSK MO Moscow	Soviet	—	18	—	—	—
1957-58	CSKA Moscow	Soviet	—	32	—	—	—
1958-59	CSKA Moscow	Soviet	—	14	—	—	—
1959-60	CSKA Moscow	Soviet	-	19	—	—	—
1960-61	CSKA Moscow	Soviet	13	19	—	—	—
1961-62	CSKA Moscow	Soviet	24	21	11	32	—
1962-63	CSKA Moscow	Soviet	38	53	9	62	—
1963–64	CSKA Moscow	Soviet	—	40	—	—	—
1964–65	CSKA Moscow	Soviet	33	25	9	34	—
1965–66	CSKA Moscow	Soviet	32	31	6	37	—
1966–67	CSKA Moscow	Soviet	40	26	12	38	—
1967–68	CSKA Moscow "C"	Soviet	37	23	21	44	—
1968–69	CSKA Moscow	Soviet	24	12	—	—	—
1972–73	CSKA Sofia	Bulgaria	?	—	—	—	—
Soviet totals			—	351	68	419	—

Source: elite prospects -

=== International ===
Year	Team	Event	GP	G	A	Pts	PIM
1957	Soviet Union	WC	7	8	—	—	—
1958	Soviet Union	WC	7	9	3	12	2
1959	Soviet Union	WC	8	4	—	—	—
1960	Soviet Union	OLY	7	7	6	13	16
1961	Soviet Union	WC	7	6	2	8	4
1963	Soviet Union	WC	7	4	6	10	2
1964	Soviet Union	OLY	8	7	4	11	7
1965	Soviet Union	WC	7	4	5	9	8
1966	Soviet Union	WC	7	9	8	17	4
1967	Soviet Union	WC	7	7	7	14	4
1968	Soviet Union	OLY	4	3	3	6	0
Senior totals			76	68	44	112	47
