= Yuri Tsitsinov =

Russian ice hockey player (1937–1994)

Yuri Aleksandrovich Tsitsinov (August 24, 1937 – August 18, 1994) was an ice hockey player who played in the Soviet Hockey League. He played for HK Lokomotiv Moscow and Krylya Sovetov Moscow. He was inducted into the Russian and Soviet Hockey Hall of Fame in 1991. He was born in Moscow, Soviet Union.
