= Yevgeni Groshev =

Soviet ice hockey player (1937–2013)

Yevgeni Nikolaevich Groshev (April 3, 1937 – January 1, 2013) was an ice hockey player who played in the Soviet Hockey League. He was born in Moscow, Soviet Union. He played for Krylya Sovetov Moscow. He was inducted into the Russian and Soviet Hockey Hall of Fame in 1991.
