= Viktor Yakushev =

Soviet ice hockey player (1937–2001)

Olympic medal record

Men's Ice hockey

Representing Soviet Union
Bronze medal – third place	1960 Squaw Valley	Ice hockey
Gold medal – first place	1964 Innsbruck	Ice hockey

Viktor Prokhorovich Yakushev (November 16, 1937 – July 6, 2001) was an ice hockey player who played in the Soviet Hockey League. He played for Lokomotiv Moscow. He was inducted into the Russian and Soviet Hockey Hall of Fame in 1963. He was born and died in Moscow.
