= Nikolai Puchkov =

Russian ice hockey player (1930–2005)

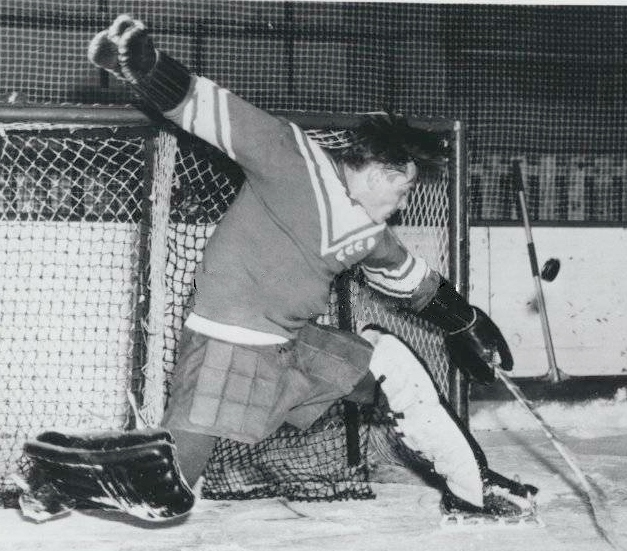
- Puchkov at the 1956 Olympics

Personal information
- Born: 30 January 1930 Moscow, Russian SFSR, Soviet Union
- Died: 8 August 2005 (aged 75) Saint Petersburg, Russia
- Height: 178 cm (5 ft 10 in)
- Weight: 82 kg (181 lb)

Sport
- Sport: Ice hockey
- Club: Dynamo Moscow (1947–49); VVS Moscow (1949–53) HC CSKA Moscow (1953–62); SKA St. Petersburg (1962–63)
Medal record
Representing the Soviet Union
Olympic Games
| Gold medal – first place | 1956 Cortina d'Ampezzo | Team |
| Bronze medal – third place | 1960 Squaw Valley | Team |
World Championships
| Gold medal – first place | 1954 Stockholm | Team |
| Silver medal – second place | 1955 Germany | Team |
| Gold medal – first place | 1956 Cortina d'Ampezzo | Team |
| Silver medal – second place | 1957 Moscow | Team |
| Silver medal – second place | 1958 Oslo | Team |
| Silver medal – second place | 1959 Prague | Team |
| Bronze medal – third place | 1960 Squaw Valley | Team |

Nikolai Georgiyevich Puchkov (Russian: Николай Георгиевич Пучков, 30 January 1930 – 8 August 2005) was a Russian ice hockey goaltender. He was part of the Soviet teams that won two Olympic and seven world championship medals between 1954 and 1960, including three gold medals. He was named the best goaltender of the 1959 World Championships and won the European title in 1954–56 and 1958–60. In 1954 he was inducted into the Russian and Soviet Hockey Hall of Fame.

Domestically, Puchkov won nine Soviet titles with VVS Moscow and CSKA Moscow. In 1962, he moved to Saint Petersburg, and after retiring the next year, he coached SKA Leningrad until 1980. In the 1970s, he also assisted Vsevolod Bobrov with the Soviet national team. In 1980–1990, he trained Izhorets Leningrad, and from 1990 to 2002 coached Swedish and Finnish clubs. He worked with the junior team of SKA St Petersburg for three years until his sudden death on the way to a training session. In 2007, a goaltending school named after Puchkov was opened in Saint Petersburg.
