= Alexander Almetov =

Soviet ice hockey player (1940–1992)

- Born: January 18, 1940; Kiev, Ukrainian SSR, Soviet Union
- Died: September 21, 1992 (aged 52); Moscow, Russia
- Height: 5 ft 10 in (178 cm)
- Weight: 182 lb (83 kg; 13 st 0 lb)
- Position: Centre
- Shot: Right
- Played for: HC CSKA Moscow
- National team: Soviet Union
- Playing career: 1958–1967

Alexander Almetov
Medal record

Representing the Soviet Union

Men's ice hockey

Olympic Games
Gold medal – first place	1964 Innsbruck	Team
Bronze medal – third place	1960 Squaw Valley	Team

World Championships
Bronze medal – third place	1960 Squaw Valley	Ice hockey
Bronze medal – third place	1961 Geneva/Lausanne	Ice hockey
Gold medal – first place	1963 Stockholm	Ice hockey
Gold medal – first place	1964 Innsbruck	Ice hockey
Gold medal – first place	1965 Tampere	Ice hockey
Gold medal – first place	1966 Ljubljana	Ice hockey
Gold medal – first place	1967 Vienna	Ice hockey

Alexander Davletovich Almetov (Russian: Александр Давлетович Альметов, January 18, 1940 – September 21, 1992) was an ice hockey player who played as a forward for HC CSKA Moscow and for the USSR Team.

== Career ==
Aleksandr Almetov was born in Kiev, Soviet Union. He was a member of the USSR Team from 1959 to 1967. He competed in the 1960 Winter Olympics, winning bronze. In 1963 he became the Honoured Master of Sports of the USSR. At the 1964 Winter Olympics he won the gold medal with the team, he played in all eight matches and scored five goals. He was gold medalist of World Championships from 1963 to 1967 and bronze medalist in 1960 and 1961. In 1960 and 1963-1967 he became European Champion, and in 1961 earned silver medal. He also was the USSR Champion from 1959 to 1961 and from 1963 to 1966. In 1965 Almetov was awarded the Order of the Red Banner of Labour.

== Career statistics ==
=== International ===
Year	Team	Event	GP	G	A	Pts	PIM
1960	Soviet Union	OLY	7	2	3	5	2
1961	Soviet Union	WC	7	4	3	7	6
1963	Soviet Union	WC	7	6	5	11	8
1964	Soviet Union	OLY	8	5	4	9	0
1965	Soviet Union	WC	7	7	5	12	0
1966	Soviet Union	WC	7	5	8	13	0
1967	Soviet Union	WC	7	8	7	15	0
Senior totals			50	37	35	72	16
