= Nikolai Karpov =

Soviet ice hockey player (1929–2013)

Medal record

Representing (Soviet Union)

Men's Ice Hockey
Bronze medal – third place	1960 Squaw Valley	Team

Nikolai Ivanovich Karpov (Russian: Николай Иванович Карпов; November 8, 1929 in Moscow, Soviet Union – November 7, 2013 in Moscow, Russia) was a Soviet ice hockey player who played for the Soviet national team. He won a bronze medal at the 1960 Winter Olympics.
