= Mikhail Bychkov =

Russian ice hockey player (1926–1997)

Olympic medal record

Men's Ice hockey

Representing Soviet Union
Bronze medal – third place	1960 Squaw Valley	Team

Mikhail Ivanovich Bychkov (Russian: Михаил Иванович Бычков, May 22, 1926 – May 17, 1997) was a Russian ice hockey player who played in the Soviet Hockey League.

He was born in Lyubertsy, Soviet Union.

Bychkov played for Krylya Sovetov Moscow and was inducted into the Russian and Soviet Hockey Hall of Fame in 1954.
