= Nikolai Sologubov =

Soviet ice hockey player (1924–1988)

Personal information
- Born: 8 August 1924 Moscow, Russian SFSR, USSR
- Died: 1 August 1988 (aged 63) Moscow, Russian SFSR, USSR
- Height: 178 cm (5 ft 10 in)
- Weight: 84 kg (185 lb)

Sport
- Sport: Ice hockey
Medal record
Representing the Soviet Union
Olympic Games
Gold medal – first place	1956 Cortina d'Ampezzo	Team
Bronze medal – third place	1960 Squaw Valley	Team
World Championships
Silver medal – second place	1955 West Germany	Team
Gold medal – first place	1956 Cortina d'Ampezzo	Team
Silver medal – second place	1957 Moscow	Team
Silver medal – second place	1958 Oslo	Team
Silver medal – second place	1959 Prague	Team
Bronze medal – third place	1960 Squaw Valley	Team
Bronze medal – third place	1961 Switzerland	Team
Gold medal – first place	1963 Stockholm	Team

Nikolai Mikhailovich Sologubov (Russian: Николай Михайлович Сологубов; 8 August 1924 – 17 August 1988) was a Russian ice hockey defenceman who won a gold and a bronze medal with Soviet teams at the 1956 and 1960 Olympics, respectively. He was inducted into the IIHF Hall of Fame in 2004.

== World War II ==
Sologubov took part in World War II. Serving in the naval infantry he was wounded in the foot in a battle near Shlisselburg in 1943 when he stepped on a German booby trap. After a month and a half rehabilitation at a hospital he returned to front into the infantry and served as a scout. Six months later he was wounded into his arm, but returned to the Leningrad front once again. He was wounded for the third time during the Krasnoye Selo offensive, when a "jumping mine" exploded very close to him. The wound was so serious, that doctors were going to amputate his leg, suspecting gangrene. Fortunately, this diagnosis had not been confirmed, but he was operated four times on the right leg and four times on the left one.

== Sports career ==
Sologubov took up skating to heal his foot injury and played ice hockey for several Moscow-based teams from 1949 to 1964, finishing with SKA Kalinin in 1964–65. He played for the national team in all major tournaments from 1955 to 1963 (except for the boycotted 1962 World Ice Hockey Championships), including Winter Olympics, world and European championships. He was the team captain in 1957–61 and served as the Soviet Olympic flag bearer at the 1960 Winter Olympics. He won an Olympic gold medal in 1956 and the European title in 1955–56, 1958–60 and 1963. At the world championships he won a gold medal in 1956 and 1963, a silver in 1955 and 1957–1959, and a bronze in 1960 and 1961, and was named world's best defenceman in 1956, 1957 and 1960. He was inducted into the IIHF Hall of Fame in 2004.

Sologubov is known for trying to help the U.S. team at the 1960 Winter Olympics. When the U.S. was losing to Czechoslovakia, Sologubov went to their dressing room and informed them (using gestures, because he did not speak English) that they should use oxygen cans for better recovery during the breaks. The Americans came back to win the game and the gold medal. The Soviets needed the United States to defeat Czechoslovakia to have an opportunity to win the silver medal. However, they would lose their last game of the tournament, finishing in a third place.

== Retirement, awards and honours ==
In 1957, Sologubov was awarded the Order of the Red Banner of Labour. He was also awarded the Medal "For Battle Merit" and the Medal "For Labour Valour". After retiring from competitions he coached ice hockey teams in Penza (1966–67) and Novokuznetsk (1967–68). In 1967 he published a book My Friend Hockey (Russian: Мой друг хоккей).

Sologubov died on 1 August 1988. He was posthumously inducted into the IIHF Hall of Fame in 2004.
