= Vladimir Grebennikov =

Soviet ice hockey player

Medal record

Representing (Soviet Union) Union of Soviet Socialist Republics (USSR)

Men's Ice Hockey
Bronze medal – third place	1960 Squaw Valley	Team

Vladimir Alekseevich Grebennikov (August 22, 1932 – December 20, 1992) was an ice hockey player who played for the Soviet national team. He won a bronze medal at the 1960 Winter Olympics as an Ice Hockey Men. In 1950-53 he played with Spartak Moskva, then in 1953-54 played with Dvorets Kultury imeny Karl Marksa Elektrostal, and in 1954-64 was with Krylya Sovetov Moskva. Vladimir Grebennikov ended his career with Spartak Ryazan in 1964-66.

== Career highlights ==
SEASON	AWARDS BY SEASON
1956-1957	World Championship Silver Medal
1959-1960	Olympic Bronze Medal
