= Genrikh Sidorenkov =

Russian ice hockey player

Olympic medal record

Men's Ice hockey

Representing Soviet Union
| Gold medal – first place | 1956 Cortina | Team |
| Bronze medal – third place | 1960 Squaw Valley | Team |

Genrikh Ivanovich Sidorenkov (Russian: Генрих Иванович Сидоренков, August 11, 1931 – January 5, 1990) was a Russian ice hockey player who played in the Soviet Hockey League.

He was born in Moscow, Soviet Union.

He played for Krylya Sovetov Moscow and HC CSKA Moscow. He was inducted into the Russian and Soviet Hockey Hall of Fame in 1956.
