= Stanislav Petukhov =

Russian ice hockey player (born 1937)

Olympic medal record

Men's Ice hockey

Representing Soviet Union
Bronze medal – third place	1960 Squaw Valley	Ice hockey
Gold medal – first place	1964 Innsbruck	Ice hockey

Stanislav Afanasievich Petukhov (born August 19, 1937, in Moscow, Soviet Union) is a Russian retired ice hockey player who played for HC Dynamo Moscow in the Soviet Hockey League. He was inducted into the Russian and Soviet Hockey Hall of Fame in 1963.
