= Yuri Baulin =

Soviet ice hockey player (1933–2006)

- Born: October 5, 1933 Moscow, Soviet Union
- Died: December 5, 2006 (aged 73) Zelenograd, Russia
- Height: 6 ft 2 in (188 cm)
- Weight: 194 lb (88 kg; 13 st 12 lb)
- Position: Defence
- Shot: Left
- Played for: Spartak Moscow; CSKA Moscow; SKA Leningrad; Torpedo Ust-Kamenogorsk
- National team: Soviet Union
- Playing career: 1952–1964

Yuri Baulin
Medal record

Representing (Soviet Union)

Olympic Games
Bronze medal – third place	1960 Squaw Valley	Ice Hockey

World Championships
Silver medal – second place	1959 Prague	Ice Hockey

Yuri Nikolaevich Baulin (Russian: Юрий Николаевич Баулин; October 5, 1933 – December 5, 2006) (also spelled: Yury) was an ice hockey player who played for the Soviet national team. He won a bronze medal at the 1960 Winter Olympics.

== Biography ==
Yuri Baulin began to play hockey in 1952 with Spartak Moscow, but in 1953 joined CSKA Moscow, playing there until 1962. He then played with SKA Leningrad (1962–64) and ended his playing career in 1964-65 with Torpedo Ust-Kamenogorsk. Baulin won Soviet titles six times (1955, 1956 and 1958–61). Internationally, besides his Olympic bronze, Baulin won silver (1959) and bronze (1960) at the World Championships and was European Champion in 1959 and 1960. After his playing career ended, Baulin worked as a hockey coach. At first he was the head coach of Torpedo Ust-Kamenogorsk, then worked as a coach with Spartak Moscow in 1971-72, winning a bronze medal at the 1972 Soviet Championships. In 1970-71 he was the head coach of the Soviet national junior team, which included such future stars as Vladislav Tretyak, Helmūts Balderis and Aleksandr Golikov, and Baulin won two World Junior Championship with them. After that he was a long-time coach of Yenbek Alma-Ata until his retirement in the late 1980s.
