= Yevgeni Yorkin =

Soviet ice hockey player (1932–1982)

Medal record

Representing (Soviet Union)

Men's Ice Hockey
| Bronze medal – third place | 1960 Squaw Valley | Team |

Yevgeny Yorkin (August 23, 1932 – November 13, 1982) was an ice hockey player who played for the Soviet national team. He won a bronze medal at the 1960 Winter Olympics.
