= 2003 Stanley Cup playoffs =

Tournament details
- Dates: April 9–June 9, 2003
- Teams: 16
- Defending champions: Detroit Red Wings

Final positions
- Champions: New Jersey Devils
- Runners-up: Mighty Ducks of Anaheim

Tournament statistics
- Scoring leader(s): Jamie Langenbrunner (Devils) & Scott Niedermayer (Devils) (18 points)

Awards
- MVP: Jean-Sebastien Giguere (Mighty Ducks)

The 2003 Stanley Cup playoffs, the playoff tournament of the National Hockey League (NHL), began on April 9, 2003, following the 2002–03 regular season. The playoffs concluded on June 9, 2003, with the New Jersey Devils defeating the Mighty Ducks of Anaheim in seven games.

The 16 qualifying teams played best-of-seven series in the conference quarterfinals, semifinals, and finals. Each conference champion proceeded to the Stanley Cup Finals. These playoffs marked the first time the Minnesota Wild qualified, in only their third season in the NHL. The Minnesota Wild, a sixth-seed, made an unlikely advance to the Western Conference Final as underdogs after being down three games to one in two consecutive rounds. This, along with the Canucks' comeback against the Blues, made for three 3–1 series comebacks in the playoffs, the second time this had happened in NHL playoff history, after 1992.

Despite losing to the Devils in the Stanley Cup Finals, Mighty Ducks goaltender Jean-Sebastien Giguere was awarded the Conn Smythe Trophy as the Most Valuable Player during the playoffs, marking only the fifth time that the Trophy had ever been awarded to a player on the losing team.

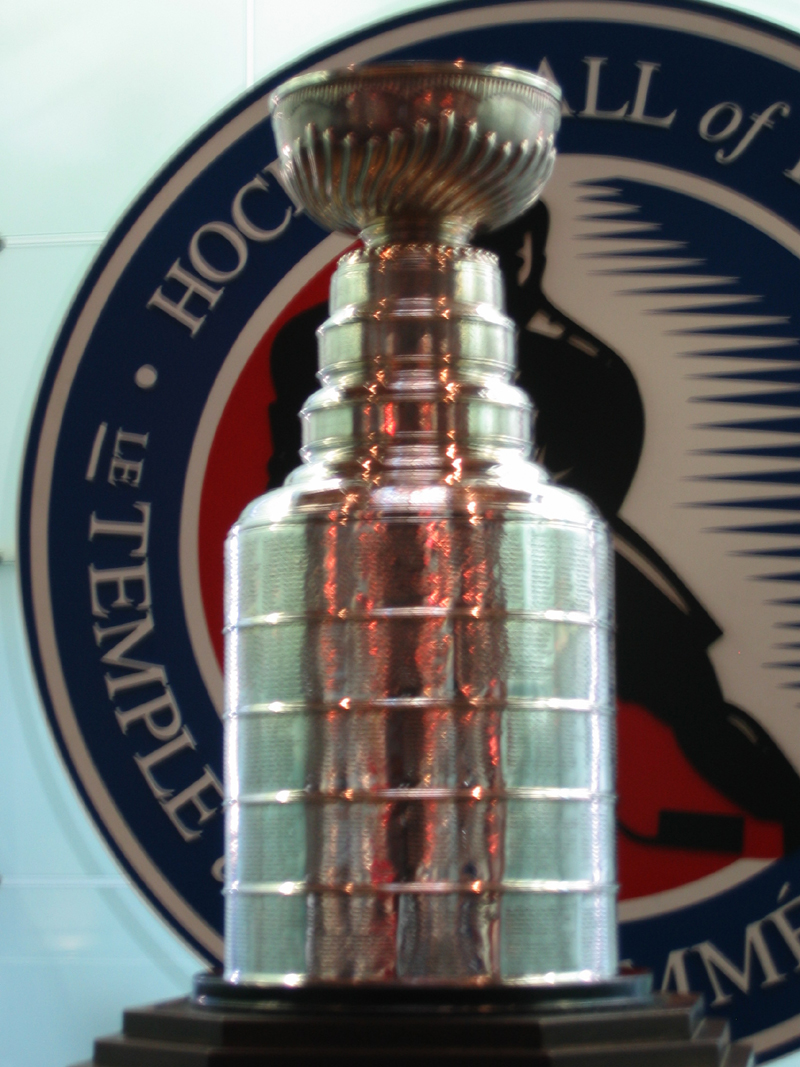
The Stanley Cup, awarded to the champion of the NHL.

== Playoff seeds ==
The top eight teams in each conference qualified for the playoffs. The top three seeds in each conference were awarded to the division winners; while the five remaining spots were awarded to the highest finishers in their respective conferences.

The following teams qualified for the playoffs:

=== Eastern Conference ===
1. Ottawa Senators, Northeast Division champions, Eastern Conference regular season champions, Presidents' Trophy winners – 113 points
2. New Jersey Devils, Atlantic Division champions – 108 points
3. Tampa Bay Lightning, Southeast Division champions – 93 points
4. Philadelphia Flyers – 107 points
5. Toronto Maple Leafs – 98 points
6. Washington Capitals – 92 points
7. Boston Bruins – 87 points
8. New York Islanders – 83 points

=== Western Conference ===
1. Dallas Stars, Pacific Division champions, Western Conference regular season champions – 111 points
2. Detroit Red Wings, Central Division champions – 110 points
3. Colorado Avalanche, Northwest Division champions – 105 points
4. Vancouver Canucks – 104 points
5. St. Louis Blues – 99 points
6. Minnesota Wild – 95 points (42 wins)
7. Mighty Ducks of Anaheim – 95 points (40 wins)
8. Edmonton Oilers – 92 points

== Playoff bracket ==
In each round, teams competed in a best-of-seven series following a 2–2–1–1–1 format (scores in the bracket indicate the number of games won in each best-of-seven series). The team with home ice advantage played at home for games one and two (and games five and seven, if necessary), and the other team played at home for games three and four (and game six, if necessary). The top eight teams in each conference made the playoffs, with the three division winners seeded 1–3 based on regular season record, and the five remaining teams seeded 4–8.

The NHL used "re-seeding" instead of a fixed bracket playoff system. During the first three rounds, the highest remaining seed in each conference was matched against the lowest remaining seed, the second-highest remaining seed played the second-lowest remaining seed, and so forth. The higher-seeded team was awarded home ice advantage. The two conference winners then advanced to the Stanley Cup Finals, where home ice advantage was awarded to the team that had the better regular season record.

Conference quarterfinals	Conference semifinals
1	Ottawa	4
8	NY Islanders	1
1	Ottawa	4
4	Philadelphia	2
2	New Jersey	4
7	Boston	1
Eastern Conference
3	Tampa Bay	4
6	Washington	2
2	New Jersey	4
3	Tampa Bay	1
4	Philadelphia	4
5	Toronto	3
1	Dallas	4
8	Edmonton	2
1	Dallas	2
7	Anaheim	4
2	Detroit	0
7	Anaheim	4
Western Conference
3	Colorado	3
6	Minnesota	4
4	Vancouver	3
6	Minnesota	4
4	Vancouver	4
5	St. Louis	3

Conference finals
1	Ottawa	3
2	New Jersey	4
7	Anaheim	4
6	Minnesota	0

Stanley Cup Finals
E2	New Jersey	4
W7	Anaheim	3

== Conference quarterfinals ==
=== Eastern Conference quarterfinals ===
==== (1) Ottawa Senators vs. (8) New York Islanders ====
The Ottawa Senators finished as the first overall seed in the Eastern Conference with 113 points. The New York Islanders earned 83 points during the regular season to finish eighth overall in the Eastern Conference. This was the first playoff series between these two teams. Ottawa won the four game regular season series by earning five of eight points in their matchup.

The Senators defeated the Islanders in five games. In game one, Roman Hamrlik assisted on two of the three goals and Islanders goalie Garth Snow shut out the Senators stopping all 25 shots he faced in a 3–0 victory. The Senators responded in game two by shutting out the Islanders 3–0; goalie Patrick Lalime stopped all 16 shots he faced. Overtime was required in game three with both teams tied at two at the end of the third period. At 2:25 of the second overtime, Todd White scored his second goal of the game to give the Senators a 3–2 victory. In game four, Marian Hossa had a goal and an assist to help the Senators take a 3–1 series lead in a 3–1 win. In game five, Todd White's goal at 11:05 of the second period proved to be the game-winner and series-winner for the Senators with Radek Bonk providing two insurance goals in a 4–1 victory.

April 9	New York Islanders	3–0	Ottawa Senators	Corel Centre	Recap
Dave Scatchard (1) – 07:59; Alexei Yashin (1) – 11:35		First period	No scoring
Shawn Bates (1) – pp – 09:06		Second period	No scoring
No scoring		Third period	No scoring
Garth Snow 25 saves / 25 shots		Goalie stats	Patrick Lalime 31 saves / 34 shots

April 12	New York Islanders	0–3	Ottawa Senators	Corel Centre	Recap
No scoring		First period	06:43 – Marian Hossa (1); 08:24 – Vaclav Varada (1)
No scoring		Second period	14:25 – pp – Marian Hossa (2)
No scoring		Third period	No scoring
Garth Snow 28 saves / 31 shots Rick DiPietro 3 saves / 3 shots		Goalie stats	Patrick Lalime 16 saves / 16 shots

April 14	Ottawa Senators	3–2	2OT	New York Islanders	Nassau Coliseum	Recap
Todd White (1) – pp – 18:42		First period		08:14 – Alexei Yashin (2); 19:06 – pp – Randy Robitaille (1)
Chris Phillips (1) – 19:16		Second period		No scoring
No scoring		Third period		No scoring
Todd White (2) – 02:25		Second overtime period		No scoring
Patrick Lalime 30 saves / 32 shots		Goalie stats		Garth Snow 29 saves / 32 shots

April 16	Ottawa Senators	3–1	New York Islanders	Nassau Coliseum	Recap
Mike Fisher (1) – 00:28; Anton Volchenkov (1) – 04:12		First period	No scoring
Marian Hossa (3) – pp – 08:01		Second period	02:48 – Adrian Aucoin (1)
No scoring		Third period	No scoring
Patrick Lalime 21 saves / 22 shots		Goalie stats	Garth Snow 25 saves / 28 shots

April 17	New York Islanders	1–4	Ottawa Senators	Corel Centre	Recap
No scoring		First period	13:53 – pp – Martin Havlat (1)
Mark Parrish (1) – pp – 06:48		Second period	11:05 – Todd White (3); 18:13 – Radek Bonk (1)
No scoring		Third period	17:45 – en – Radek Bonk (2)
Garth Snow 15 saves / 18 shots		Goalie stats	Patrick Lalime 31 saves / 32 shots

Ottawa won series 4–1

==== (2) New Jersey Devils vs. (7) Boston Bruins ====
The New Jersey Devils entered the playoffs as the second seed in the Eastern Conference and won the Atlantic Division title with 108 points. The Boston Bruins finished seventh overall in the Eastern Conference with 87 points. This was the fourth playoff meeting between these two teams with New Jersey winning two of three previous series. They last met in the 1995 Eastern Conference Quarterfinals which New Jersey won in five games. New Jersey won this year's four game regular season series earning five of eight points.

The Devils defeated the Bruins in five games. In game one, Jamie Langenbrunner scored both New Jersey goals before Boston came within one goal in the third period. New Jersey hung on for a 2–1 win. Jamie Langenbrunner had a goal and two assists in game two to help the Devils achieve a 4–2 victory and a 2–0 series lead. In game three, goalie Martin Brodeur shut out the Bruins, stopping all 29 shots in a 3–0 victory. The Boston Bruins forced a fifth game on two goals by Dan McGillis as well as two assists provided by Mike Knuble and Brian Rolston in a 5–1 win. The Devils closed out the series in game five with Jamie Langenbrunner scoring twice and Martin Brodeur stopping all 28 shots he faced in a 3–0 win.

April 9	Boston Bruins	1–2	New Jersey Devils	Continental Airlines Arena	Recap
No Scoring		First period	15:35 – Jamie Langenbrunner (1)
No Scoring		Second period	11:38 – Jamie Langenbrunner (2)
Bryan Berard (1) – 03:29		Third period	No Scoring
Steve Shields 26 saves / 28 shots		Goalie stats	Martin Brodeur 26 saves / 27 shots

April 11	Boston Bruins	2–4	New Jersey Devils	Continental Airlines Arena	Recap
Glen Murray (1) – 08:52		First period	14:17 – Jeff Friesen (1); 19:34 – pp – Brian Rafalski (1)
Dan McGillis (1) – pp – 13:59		Second period	No Scoring
No Scoring		Third period	00:15 – pp – Jamie Langenbrunner (3); 14:24 – Joe Nieuwendyk (1)
Steve Shields 26 saves / 30 shots		Goalie stats	Martin Brodeur 24 saves / 26 shots

April 13	New Jersey Devils	3–0	Boston Bruins	FleetCenter	Recap
No Scoring		First period	No Scoring
Scott Stevens (1) – 01:11		Second period	No Scoring
Jay Pandolfo (1) – 12:00; John Madden (1) – en – 18:54		Third period	No Scoring
Martin Brodeur 29 saves / 29 shots		Goalie stats	Jeff Hackett 19 saves / 21 shots

April 15	New Jersey Devils	1–5	Boston Bruins	FleetCenter	Recap
No Scoring		First period	19:47 – pp – Joe Thornton (1)
No Scoring		Second period	02:24 – pp – Dan McGillis (2); 17:15 – Dan McGillis (3)
Scott Niedermayer (1) – 01:37		Third period	01:45 – Martin Lapointe (1); 03:37 – Marty McInnis (1)
Martin Brodeur 19 saves / 24 shots Corey Schwab 6 saves / 6 shots		Goalie stats	Jeff Hackett 24 saves / 25 shots

April 17	Boston Bruins	0–3	New Jersey Devils	Continental Airlines Arena	Recap
No Scoring		First period	08:31 – pp – John Madden (2)
No Scoring		Second period	No Scoring
No Scoring		Third period	07:41 – Jamie Langenbrunner (4); 19:08 – en – Jamie Langenbrunner (5)
Jeff Hackett 28 saves / 30 shots		Goalie stats	Martin Brodeur 28 saves / 28 shots

New Jersey won series 4–1

==== (3) Tampa Bay Lightning vs. (6) Washington Capitals ====
The Tampa Bay Lightning entered the playoffs for only the second time in their history as the third seed in the Eastern Conference and won the Southeast Division title with 93 points. The Washington Capitals finished sixth overall in the Eastern Conference with 92 points. This was the first playoff meeting between these two teams. Washington won three of the five games in this year's regular season series.

The Lightning came back from 2–0 down to defeat the Capitals in six games. Robert Lang provided two goals and Olaf Kolzig stopped all 28 shots to give the Capitals a 3–0 victory in game one. Game two saw Jaromir Jagr score two goals and two assists in a 6–3 win for Washington. The Lightning scored three times in game three; each time though Washington tied the score. Finally in overtime, Vincent Lecavalier scored a power-play goal to give Tampa Bay a 4–3 victory. With a chance to tie the series in game four, Martin St. Louis scored twice to help the Lightning earn a 3–1 victory. In game five, St. Louis contributed a goal and an assist, including the game-winning goal with 8:07 left in the third period, to aid the Lightning in a 2–1 win and took a 3–2 series lead. The Capitals tried to avoid elimination in game six by sending the game into overtime, however, St. Louis' power-play goal at 4:03 of the third overtime ended Washington's season despite putting up 61 shots against goalie Nikolai Khabibulin. The Lightning won the game 2–1 and won their first playoff series in franchise history.

April 10	Washington Capitals	3–0	Tampa Bay Lightning	St. Pete Times Forum	Recap
Robert Lang (1) – 16:01		First period	No scoring
Robert Lang (2) – 17:57		Second period	No scoring
Michael Nylander (1) – 01:02		Third period	No scoring
Olaf Kolzig 28 saves / 28 shots		Goalie stats	Nikolai Khabibulin 19 saves / 22 shots

April 12	Washington Capitals	6–3	Tampa Bay Lightning	St. Pete Times Forum	Recap
Jaromir Jagr (1) – 04:47; Peter Bondra (1) – pp – 07:22; Jaromir Jagr (2) – pp – 18:24		First period	11:48 – Vaclav Prospal (1)
Michael Nylander (2) – pp – 01:39		Second period	18:48 – Fredrik Modin (1)
Peter Bondra (2) – 03:09; Mike Grier (1) – en – 19:18		Third period	10:44 – Dave Andreychuk (1)
Olaf Kolzig 40 saves / 43 shots		Goalie stats	Nikolai Khabibulin 25 saves / 30 shots

April 15	Tampa Bay Lightning	4–3	OT	Washington Capitals	MCI Center	Recap
Vincent Lecavalier (1) – 03:46		First period		14:21 – pp – Dainius Zubrus (1)
Vaclav Prospal (2) – 03:44		Second period		10:25 – Dainius Zubrus (2)
Martin St. Louis (1) – 11:13		Third period		17:04 – Brendan Witt (1)
Vincent Lecavalier (2) – pp – 02:29		First overtime period		No scoring
Nikolai Khabibulin 16 saves / 19 shots		Goalie stats		Olaf Kolzig 24 saves / 28 shots

April 16	Tampa Bay Lightning	3–1	Washington Capitals	MCI Center	Recap
No scoring		First period	No scoring
Martin St. Louis (2) – 11:55; Martin St. Louis (3) – sh – 17:40		Second period	15:39 – Peter Bondra (3)
Vincent Lecavalier (3) – 01:24		Third period	No scoring
Nikolai Khabibulin 22 saves / 23 shots		Goalie stats	Olaf Kolzig 22 saves / 25 shots

April 18	Washington Capitals	1–2	Tampa Bay Lightning	St. Pete Times Forum	Recap
No scoring		First period	13:52 – pp – Vaclav Prospal (3)
Michael Nylander (3) – 17:01		Second period	No scoring
No scoring		Third period	11:53 – Martin St. Louis (4)
Olaf Kolzig 20 saves / 22 shots		Goalie stats	Nikolai Khabibulin 22 saves / 23 shots

April 20	Tampa Bay Lightning	2–1	3OT	Washington Capitals	MCI Center	Recap
No scoring		First period		No scoring
No scoring		Second period		17:34 – pp – Peter Bondra (4)
Dave Andreychuk (2) – pp – 15:54		Third period		No scoring
Martin St. Louis (5) – pp – 04:03		Third overtime period		No scoring
Nikolai Khabibulin 60 saves / 61 shots		Goalie stats		Olaf Kolzig 44 saves / 46 shots

Tampa Bay won series 4–2

==== (4) Philadelphia Flyers vs. (5) Toronto Maple Leafs ====
The Philadelphia Flyers finished as the fourth seed in the Eastern Conference with 107 points. The Toronto Maple Leafs finished as the fifth seed in the Eastern Conference with 98 points. This was the fifth playoff meeting between these two teams with Philadelphia winning three of the previous four series. They last met in the 1999 Eastern Conference Quarterfinal, which Toronto won in six games. The teams split this year's four game regular season series.

The Flyers defeated the Maple Leafs in seven games. In game one, Alexander Mogilny scored a hat trick to give Toronto a 5–3 victory. The Flyers responded to the loss with a 4–1 win in game two with John LeClair, Mark Recchi, and Simon Gagne all contributing a goal and an assist. In game three, Toronto came back from an early two-goal deficit to win the game in double overtime on a goal by Tomas Kaberle, his second of the game. Game four showcased a triple overtime game in which Philadelphia nearly doubled the shots Toronto took. On the 75th shot for the Flyers, at 13:54 of the third overtime Mark Recchi scored his second goal of the game to help the Flyers take a 3–2 win. Sami Kapanen scored two power play goals in game five to assist the Flyers in a 4–1 win and took a 3–2 series lead. In game six, Robert Reichel opened the scoring after a distracted Roman Cechmanek was attempting to put his glove back on as he had lost it behind the net. Toronto forced a seventh game with 35 saves from Ed Belfour and a game-winning goal from Travis Green in double overtime. The Flyers routed the Maple Leafs in game seven 6–1 with Mark Recchi scoring two goals and an assist and Justin Williams and Claude Lapointe both scoring a goal and two assists.

April 9	Toronto Maple Leafs	5–3	Philadelphia Flyers	Wachovia Center	Recap
Alexander Mogilny (1) – sh – 08:10; Alexander Mogilny (2) – 12:10		First period	09:12 – pp – Eric Weinrich (1)
Tie Domi (1) – 03:12		Second period	05:54 – Donald Brashear (1); 06:56 – Eric Desjardins (1)
Mikael Renberg (1) – pp – 14:21; Alexander Mogilny (3) – en – 19:08		Third period	No scoring
Ed Belfour 28 saves / 31 shots		Goalie stats	Roman Cechmanek 10 saves / 14 shots

April 11	Toronto Maple Leafs	1–4	Philadelphia Flyers	Wachovia Center	Recap
No scoring		First period	12:09 – sh – Simon Gagne (1); 17:47 – Jeremy Roenick (1)
Alexander Mogilny (4) – 04:38		Second period	06:20 – Mark Recchi (1); 10:34 – pp – John LeClair (1)
No scoring		Third period	No scoring
Ed Belfour 32 saves / 36 shots		Goalie stats	Roman Cechmanek 16 saves / 17 shots

April 14	Philadelphia Flyers	3–4	2OT	Toronto Maple Leafs	Air Canada Centre	Recap
Eric Weinrich (2) – 04:02; Eric Desjardins (2) – 08:02		First period		08:39 – Robert Reichel (1)
No scoring		Second period		02:18 – pp – Tomas Kaberle (1); 16:00 – Alexander Mogilny (5)
Mark Recchi (2) – 02:59		Third period		No scoring
No scoring		Second overtime period		07:20 – Tomas Kaberle (2)
Roman Cechmanek 37 saves / 41 shots		Goalie stats		Ed Belfour 36 saves / 39 shots

April 16	Philadelphia Flyers	3–2	3OT	Toronto Maple Leafs	Air Canada Centre	Recap
Mark Recchi (3) – 01:16		First period		04:06 – sh – Travis Green (1)
Jeremy Roenick (2) – 00:54		Second period		No scoring
No scoring		Third period		01:51 – pp – Mats Sundin (1)
Mark Recchi (4) – 13:54		Third overtime period		No scoring
Roman Cechmanek 36 saves / 38 shots		Goalie stats		Ed Belfour 72 saves / 75 shots

April 19	Toronto Maple Leafs	1–4	Philadelphia Flyers	Wachovia Center	Recap
Aki Berg (1) – 02:34		First period	14:30 – pp – Sami Kapanen (1); 16:25 – Dmitri Yushkevich (1)
No scoring		Second period	14:35 – Simon Gagne (2)
No scoring		Third period	08:41 – pp – Sami Kapanen (2)
Ed Belfour 25 saves / 29 shots		Goalie stats	Roman Cechmanek 22 saves / 23 shots

April 21	Philadelphia Flyers	1–2	2OT	Toronto Maple Leafs	Air Canada Centre	Recap
No scoring		First period		10:35 – Robert Reichel (2)
Jeremy Roenick (3) – 15:23		Second period		No scoring
No scoring		Third period		No scoring
No scoring		Second overtime period		10:51 – Travis Green (2)
Roman Cechmanek 34 saves / 36 shots		Goalie stats		Ed Belfour 35 saves / 36 shots

April 22	Toronto Maple Leafs	1–6	Philadelphia Flyers	Wachovia Center	Recap
No scoring		First period	16:23 – Simon Gagne (3); 19:08 – Justin Williams (1)
Gary Roberts (1) – 13:50		Second period	08:18 – Keith Primeau (1); 16:16 – Mark Recchi (5); 19:22 – pp – Mark Recchi (6)
No scoring		Third period	08:28 – Claude Lapointe (1)
Ed Belfour 30 saves / 36 shots		Goalie stats	Roman Cechmanek 18 saves / 19 shots

Philadelphia won series 4–3

=== Western Conference quarterfinals ===
==== (1) Dallas Stars vs. (8) Edmonton Oilers ====
The Dallas Stars finished first in the Western Conference with 111 points. The Edmonton Oilers finished as the eighth seed in the Western Conference with 92 points. This was the sixth playoff meeting within the last seven years and the eighth overall between these two teams; Dallas won five of the previous seven playoff series. They last met in the 2001 Western Conference Quarterfinals which Dallas won in six games. Dallas won three of the four games in this year's regular season series.

In game one, Edmonton scored two goals in the second period 3:48 apart to take the lead and then win the game 2–1. Dallas controlled game two by allowing only 13 shots on goal, and five different players scored in a 6–1 victory including Scott Young who had two goals and an assist. In game three, Edmonton scored three times within 3:05 to take a 3–2 lead early in the third period to win the game. Eric Brewer assisted on two of the goals. The Stars evened the series in game four by scoring 23 seconds apart in the third period taking a 3–1 victory as a result. In game five, Sergei Zubov scored two goals in a 5–2 win for the Stars. Although Edmonton tied the game in the second period after being down two goals, Mike Modano's goal at 13:08 of the third period proved to be the series-winner.

April 9	Edmonton Oilers	2–1	Dallas Stars	American Airlines Center	Recap
No scoring		First period	08:52 – pp – Mike Modano (1)
Ryan Smyth (1) – sh – 03:22; Shawn Horcoff (1) – 07:10		Second period	No scoring
No scoring		Third period	No scoring
Tommy Salo 20 saves / 21 shots		Goalie stats	Marty Turco 21 saves / 23 shots

April 11	Edmonton Oilers	1–6	Dallas Stars	American Airlines Center	Recap
Marty Reasoner (1) – pp – 06:35		First period	10:03 – pp – Sergei Zubov (1); 14:12 – pp – Scott Young (1); 19:10 – Scott Young (2)
No scoring		Second period	18:52 – Jason Arnott (1)
No scoring		Third period	04:21 – Mike Modano (2); 06:39 – pp – Ulf Dahlen (1)
Tommy Salo 24 saves / 29 shots Jussi Markkanen 11 saves / 12 shots		Goalie stats	Marty Turco 12 saves / 13 shots

April 13	Dallas Stars	2–3	Edmonton Oilers	Skyreach Centre	Recap
Jason Arnott (2) – pp – 10:50		First period	No scoring
No scoring		Second period	No scoring
Jere Lehtinen (1) – 03:23		Third period	02:33 – Georges Laraque (1); 04:40 – Fernando Pisani (1); 05:38 – Radek Dvorak (1)
Marty Turco 22 saves / 25 shots		Goalie stats	Tommy Salo 30 saves / 32 shots

April 15	Dallas Stars	3–1	Edmonton Oilers	Skyreach Centre	Recap
Sergei Zubov (2) – 01:18		First period	No scoring
No scoring		Second period	No scoring
Stu Barnes (1) – 05:52; Niko Kapanen (1) – 06:15		Third period	02:07 – Shawn Horcoff (2)
Marty Turco 23 saves / 24 shots		Goalie stats	Tommy Salo 25 saves / 28 shots

April 17	Edmonton Oilers	2–5	Dallas Stars	American Airlines Center	Recap
No scoring		First period	09:02 – pp – Scott Young (3); 09:55 – pp – Sergei Zubov (3)
No scoring		Second period	05:34 – Mike Modano (3)
Mike Comrie (1) – 09:58; Eric Brewer (1) – 18:08		Third period	05:39 – Sergei Zubov (4); 19:33 – en – Manny Malhotra (1)
Tommy Salo 23 saves / 27 shots		Goalie stats	Marty Turco 15 saves / 17 shots

April 19	Dallas Stars	3–2	Edmonton Oilers	Skyreach Centre	Recap
Scott Young (4) – 00:43; Philippe Boucher (1) – 10:39		First period	No scoring
No scoring		Second period	02:22 – Ryan Smyth (2); 08:34 – Shawn Horcoff (3)
Mike Modano (4) – 13:08		Third period	No scoring
Marty Turco 30 saves / 32 shots		Goalie stats	Tommy Salo 21 saves / 24 shots

Dallas won series 4–2

==== (2) Detroit Red Wings vs. (7) Mighty Ducks of Anaheim ====
The Detroit Red Wings finished as the second seed in the Western Conference, winning the Central Division with 110 points. The Mighty Ducks of Anaheim finished as the seventh seed with 95 points (losing the tiebreaker with Minnesota in total wins). This was the third playoff meeting between these two teams with Detroit winning both previous series via four-game sweeps. They last met in the 1999 Western Conference Quarterfinals which Detroit won in four games. Detroit won three of the four games in this year's regular season series.

For the first time in their history, Anaheim won a series in a four-game sweep. In game one, the score remained tied 1–1 through three periods of play. In the first overtime, Luc Robitaille appeared to score the game-winner with most Detroit players heading down the locker room when replay actually showed the puck hit the crossbar and post but stayed out. Finally in the third overtime, Paul Kariya scored at 3:18 to end the game; Jean-Sebastien Giguere made 63 saves in the 2–1 win for the Mighty Ducks. Rob Niedermayer had two assists in the Mighty Ducks' 3–2 victory in game two. Detroit almost tied the game in game three cutting the deficit to one goal late in the third period, however the Mighty Ducks would reign victorious in a 2–1 triumph with J.S. Giguere making 36 saves in the process. Anaheim ended Detroit's season in the first overtime of game four on Steve Rucchin's goal. The Red Wings became only the second defending Stanley Cup champions to be swept in four games the following year in a first round series, the other being the 1952 Toronto Maple Leafs. They also became only the third defending Stanley Cup champions to be swept in four games the following year in any round series, joining the 1952 Maple Leafs and 1995 New York Rangers.

April 10	Mighty Ducks of Anaheim	2–1	3OT	Detroit Red Wings	Joe Louis Arena	Recap
Adam Oates (1) – 15:33		First period		04:15 – pp – Brendan Shanahan (1)
No scoring		Second period		No scoring
No scoring		Third period		No scoring
Paul Kariya (1) – 03:18		Third overtime period		No scoring
Jean-Sebastien Giguere 63 saves / 64 shots		Goalie stats		Curtis Joseph 42 saves / 44 shots

April 12	Mighty Ducks of Anaheim	3–2	Detroit Red Wings	Joe Louis Arena	Recap
Stanislav Chistov (1) – 07:17		First period	No scoring
No scoring		Second period	02:14 – Jason Woolley (1); 06:39 – Luc Robitaille (1)
Jason Krog (1) – 13:34; Steve Thomas (1) – 15:46		Third period	No scoring
Jean-Sebastien Giguere 34 saves / 36 shots		Goalie stats	Curtis Joseph 20 saves / 23 shots

April 14	Detroit Red Wings	1–2	Mighty Ducks of Anaheim	Arrowhead Pond of Anaheim	Recap
No scoring		First period	No scoring
No scoring		Second period	02:31 – Samuel Pahlsson (1)
Tomas Holmstrom (1) – pp – 13:44		Third period	01:44 – Stanislav Chistov (2)
Curtis Joseph 24 saves / 26 shots		Goalie stats	Jean-Sebastien Giguere 36 saves / 37 shots

April 16	Detroit Red Wings	2–3	OT	Mighty Ducks of Anaheim	Arrowhead Pond of Anaheim	Recap
Henrik Zetterberg (1) – 13:23		First period		15:08 – Paul Kariya (2)
No scoring		Second period		No scoring
Sergei Fedorov (1) – 17:45		Third period		04:35 – Jason Krog (2)
No scoring		First overtime period		06:53 – Steve Rucchin (1)
Curtis Joseph 24 saves / 27 shots		Goalie stats		Jean-Sebastien Giguere 32 saves / 34 shots

Anaheim won series 4–0

==== (3) Colorado Avalanche vs. (6) Minnesota Wild ====
The Colorado Avalanche finished as the third seed in the Western Conference, winning the Northwest Division with 105 points. The Minnesota Wild finished as the sixth seed in the Western Conference with 95 points (winning the tiebreaker with Anaheim in total wins). This was the Wild's first playoff appearance since joining the League in 2000. This was also the first time since 1992 that an NHL team from Minnesota made the playoffs. This was the first playoff meeting between these two teams. Colorado won this year's four game regular season series earning six of eight points.

The Minnesota Wild came back from a 3–1 deficit to defeat the Colorado Avalanche in seven games. In game one, Minnesota scored three goals in the second period, two on the power play, to win the game 4–2. Colorado vanquished the Wild in game two with defenceman Rob Blake assisting twice in a 3–2 victory. Patrick Roy earned his 23rd and final playoff shutout in game three stopping all 18 shots he faced in a 3–0 win for the Avalanche. In game four, Minnesota Wild head coach Jacques Lemaire replaced goaltender Dwayne Roloson who had given up two goals, both to Joe Sakic, on four shots with Manny Fernandez. The switch did not help the Wild as they fell to the Avalanche in a 3–1 loss. Minnesota gained a 3–0 lead within the first two periods of game five before they had to withstand a comeback by the Avalanche in the third period notching the score within one goal. The Wild forced a sixth game with a 3–2 victory. Game six was a scoreless affair until the third period in which both teams each scored twice with Greg de Vries scoring the tying goal for the Avalanche with 1:32 left in the third period. In overtime, Richard Park scored his second goal of the game for the Wild to force a seventh game. In game seven, the Avalanche twice had one goal leads before the Wild tied the game a minute and a half later. Finally in overtime, Minnesota completed the comeback with Andrew Brunette's goal to send the Wild to the Conference Semifinals. This game was also Patrick Roy's last NHL game as he announced his retirement during the offseason.

April 10	Minnesota Wild	4–2	Colorado Avalanche	Pepsi Center	Recap
No scoring		First period	No scoring
Filip Kuba (1) – pp – 05:33; Marian Gaborik (1) – pp – 09:28; Wes Walz (1) – 09:53		Second period	13:22 – Joe Sakic (1)
Andrew Brunette (1) – 16:00		Third period	17:01 – Milan Hejduk (1)
Dwayne Roloson 39 saves / 41 shots		Goalie stats	Patrick Roy 23 saves / 27 shots

April 12	Minnesota Wild	2–3	Colorado Avalanche	Pepsi Center	Recap
Wes Walz (2) – sh – 08:09		First period	04:22 – pp – Milan Hejduk (2); 14:41 – Greg de Vries (1)
No scoring		Second period	No scoring
Andrew Brunette (1) – pp – 19:24		Third period	05:49 – Brian Willsie (1)
Dwayne Roloson 25 saves / 28 shots		Goalie stats	Patrick Roy 24 saves / 26 shots

April 14	Colorado Avalanche	3–0	Minnesota Wild	Xcel Energy Center	Recap
Alex Tanguay (1) – 03:33		First period	No scoring
Joe Sakic (2) – 13:58		Second period	No scoring
Peter Forsberg (1) – pp – 07:55		Third period	No scoring
Patrick Roy 18 saves / 18 shots		Goalie stats	Dwayne Roloson 15 saves / 18 shots

April 16	Colorado Avalanche	3–1	Minnesota Wild	Xcel Energy Center	Recap
Joe Sakic (3) – 06:10; Joe Sakic (4) – pp – 08:04		First period	No scoring
No scoring		Second period	No scoring
Dan Hinote (1) – 18:41		Third period	17:20 – pp – Marian Gaborik (2)
Patrick Roy 24 saves / 25 shots		Goalie stats	Dwayne Roloson 2 saves / 4 shots Manny Fernandez 16 saves / 17 shots

April 19	Minnesota Wild	3–2	Colorado Avalanche	Pepsi Center	Recap
Willie Mitchell (1) – 03:41		First period	No scoring
Filip Kuba (2) – pp – 03:45; Pascal Dupuis (1) – 18:42		Second period	No scoring
No scoring		Third period	02:01 – Steven Reinprecht (1); 19:32 – Rob Blake (1)
Manny Fernandez 26 saves / 28 shots		Goalie stats	Patrick Roy 25 saves / 28 shots

April 21	Colorado Avalanche	2–3	OT	Minnesota Wild	Xcel Energy Center	Recap
No scoring		First period		No scoring
No scoring		Second period		No scoring
Joe Sakic (5) – 16:34; Greg de Vries (2) – 18:28		Third period		01:45 – Richard Park (1); 12:06 – Marian Gaborik (3)
No scoring		First overtime period		04:22 – Richard Park (2)
Patrick Roy 20 saves / 23 shots		Goalie stats		Manny Fernandez 22 saves / 24 shots

April 22	Minnesota Wild	3–2	OT	Colorado Avalanche	Pepsi Center	Recap
No scoring		First period		No scoring
Pascal Dupuis (2) – pp – 07:38		Second period		06:16 – Peter Forsberg (2)
Marian Gaborik (4) – pp – 15:32		Third period		13:15 – pp – Joe Sakic (6)
Andrew Brunette (3) – 03:25		First overtime period		No scoring
Manny Fernandez 43 saves / 45 shots		Goalie stats		Patrick Roy 27 saves / 30 shots

Minnesota won series 4–3

==== (4) Vancouver Canucks vs. (5) St. Louis Blues ====
The Vancouver Canucks finished as the fourth seed in the Western Conference with 104 points. The St. Louis Blues finished as the fifth seed in the Western Conference with 99 points. This was the second playoff meeting between these two teams. Their only previous series was during the 1995 Western Conference Quarterfinals, which Vancouver won in seven games. Vancouver won this year's four game regular season series earning five of eight points.

The Vancouver Canucks became the first team in league history to come back from a 3–1 series deficit for the third time in team history, defeating St. Louis in seven games. In game one, goaltender Chris Osgood stopped all 20 shots and Alexander Khavanov scored twice for the Blues in a 6–0 win. Game two saw both Trent Klatt and Ed Jovanovski score power-play goals for the Canucks in a 2–1 victory. Doug Weight scored twice and added an assist for the Blues' 3–1 win in game three. In game four, Martin Rucinsky scored twice and recorded an assist for the Blues in their 4–1 win against the Canucks. Five players scored in the Canucks' 5–3 victory in game five. Markus Naslund helped the Canucks force a seventh game by scoring a goal and two assists in a 4–3 win in game six. The Canucks finished the comeback in game seven with help from goaltender Dan Cloutier, who made 33 saves and both Trevor Linden and Brendan Morrison scored a goal and an assist in a 4–1 victory.

April 10	St. Louis Blues	6–0	Vancouver Canucks	General Motors Place	Recap
Cory Stillman (1) – pp – 01:30; Tyson Nash (1) – 02:01		First period	No scoring
Keith Tkachuk (1) – 01:38; Alexander Khavanov (1) – pp – 15:05		Second period	No scoring
Alexander Khavanov (2) – 10:10; Doug Weight (1) – pp – 16:18		Third period	No scoring
Chris Osgood 20 saves / 20 shots		Goalie stats	Dan Cloutier 23 saves / 29 shots

April 12	St. Louis Blues	1–2	Vancouver Canucks	General Motors Place	Recap
No scoring		First period	03:33 – pp – Trent Klatt (1)
No scoring		Second period	18:54 – pp – Ed Jovanovski (1)
Pavol Demitra (1) – pp – 19:05		Third period	No scoring
Chris Osgood 21 saves / 23 shots		Goalie stats	Dan Cloutier 26 saves / 27 shots

April 14	Vancouver Canucks	1–3	St. Louis Blues	Savvis Center	Recap
No scoring		First period	No scoring
Marek Malik (1) – pp – 18:53		Second period	01:44 – Pavol Demitra (2); 10:07 – pp– Doug Weight (2)
No scoring		Third period	19:41 – pp-en – Doug Weight (3)
Dan Cloutier 21 saves / 23 shots		Goalie stats	Chris Osgood 13 saves / 14 shots

April 16	Vancouver Canucks	1–4	St. Louis Blues	Savvis Center	Recap
Markus Naslund (1) – 11:57		First period	No scoring
No scoring		Second period	04:35 – Chris Pronger (1); 15:07 – Dallas Drake (1)
No scoring		Third period	14:09 – Martin Rucinsky (1); 15:46 – Martin Rucinsky (2)
Dan Cloutier 16 saves / 20 shots		Goalie stats	Chris Osgood 32 saves / 33 shots

April 18	St. Louis Blues	3–5	Vancouver Canucks	General Motors Place	Recap
No scoring		First period	02:15 – Brent Sopel (1)
Tyson Nash (2) – 07:02		Second period	08:36 – Todd Bertuzzi (1); 16:24 – Brendan Morrison (1); 18:28 – pp – Markus Naslund (2)
Cory Stillman (2) – pp – 07:57; Martin Rucinsky (3) – 19:04		Third period	19:11 – Sami Salo (1)
Chris Osgood 30 saves / 35 shots		Goalie stats	Dan Cloutier 29 saves / 32 shots

April 20	Vancouver Canucks	4–3	St. Louis Blues	Savvis Center	Recap
Markus Naslund (3) – 03:49; Mattias Ohlund (1) – 14:25		First period	10:42 – pp – Doug Weight (4)
Henrik Sedin (1) – pp – 08:52; Ed Jovanovski (2) – pp – 16:12		Second period	No scoring
No scoring		Third period	06:21 – pp – Eric Boguniecki (1); 10:13 – pp – Doug Weight (5)
Dan Cloutier 29 saves / 32 shots		Goalie stats	Chris Osgood 22 saves / 26 shots

April 22	St. Louis Blues	1–4	Vancouver Canucks	General Motors Place	Recap
Martin Rucinsky (4) – 01:00		First period	11:54 – Henrik Sedin (2)
No scoring		Second period	07:20 – Brendan Morrison (2); 12:25 – pp – Markus Naslund (4)
No scoring		Third period	00:28 – sh – Trevor Linden (1)
Chris Osgood 28 saves / 32 shots		Goalie stats	Dan Cloutier 33 saves / 34 shots

Vancouver won series 4–3

== Conference semifinals ==
=== Eastern Conference semifinals ===
==== (1) Ottawa Senators vs. (4) Philadelphia Flyers ====
This was the second consecutive playoff meeting and second overall between these two teams; Ottawa won in the previous year's Eastern Conference Quarterfinals in five games. The teams split this year's four game regular season series.

The Senators defeated the Flyers in six games. In game one, Ottawa came back from a two-goal deficit in the first period to win 4–2. The Flyers shutout the Senators in game two 2–0; goaltender Roman Cechmanek made 33 saves in the effort. In overtime of game three, Wade Redden scored to give the Senators a 3–2 win over the Flyers. Michal Handzus scored the only goal in the Flyers' 1–0 win in game four with Cechmanek stopping all 28 shots he faced. In game five, Marian Hossa had two assists in the Senators 5–2 victory. In game six, Ottawa limited the Flyers to just one goal while the Senators themselves laid five goals on Philadelphia each from different players. Ottawa won the game 5–1 and advanced to the Conference Finals for the first time in their history.

April 25	Philadelphia Flyers	2–4	Ottawa Senators	Corel Centre	Recap
Tony Amonte (1) – 01:19; Sami Kapanen (3) – 10:48		First period	No scoring
No scoring		Second period	02:34 – Martin Havlat (2); 05:33 – Marian Hossa (4); 09:32 – pp – Daniel Alfredsson (1)
No scoring		Third period	11:49 – Zdeno Chara (1)
Roman Cechmanek 13 saves / 17 shots		Goalie stats	Patrick Lalime 23 saves / 25 shots

April 27	Philadelphia Flyers	2–0	Ottawa Senators	Corel Centre	Recap
Simon Gagne (4) – 06:57		First period	No scoring
No scoring		Second period	No scoring
Mark Recchi (7) – 13:02		Third period	No scoring
Roman Cechmanek 33 saves / 33 shots		Goalie stats	Patrick Lalime 21 saves / 23 shots

April 29	Ottawa Senators	3–2	OT	Philadelphia Flyers	Wachovia Center	Recap
No scoring		First period		04:35 – John LeClair (2)
Daniel Alfredsson (2) – pp – 01:06		Second period		12:46 – Sami Kapanen (4)
Marian Hossa (5) – pp – 00:22		Third period		No scoring
Wade Redden (1) – 06:43		First overtime period		No scoring
Patrick Lalime 20 saves / 22 shots		Goalie stats		Roman Cechmanek 24 saves / 27 shots

May 1	Ottawa Senators	0–1	Philadelphia Flyers	Wachovia Center	Recap
No scoring		First period	17:06 – Michal Handzus (1)
No scoring		Second period	No scoring
No scoring		Third period	No scoring
Patrick Lalime 25 saves / 26 shots		Goalie stats	Roman Cechmanek 28 saves / 28 shots

May 3	Philadelphia Flyers	2–5	Ottawa Senators	Corel Centre	Recap
Claude Lapointe (2) – 00:21		First period	07:15 – Bryan Smolinski (1); 15:24 – pp – Daniel Alfredsson (3)
No scoring		Second period	08:07 – Martin Havlat (3); 09:56 – pp – Radek Bonk (3)
Radovan Somik (1) – 07:55		Third period	06:59 – sh – Peter Schaefer (1)
Roman Cechmanek 12 saves / 16 shots Robert Esche 13 saves / 14 shots		Goalie stats	Patrick Lalime 17 saves / 19 shots

May 5	Ottawa Senators	5–1	Philadelphia Flyers	Wachovia Center	Recap
Peter Schaefer (2) – 02:41; Mike Fisher (2) – sh – 07:00		First period	No scoring
Daniel Alfredsson (4) – pp – 14:06; Bryan Smolinski (2) – 16:27		Second period	18:07 – Michal Handzus (2)
Martin Havlat (4) – 13:37		Third period	No scoring
Patrick Lalime 18 saves / 19 shots		Goalie stats	Roman Cechmanek 25 saves / 30 shots

Ottawa won series 4–2

==== (2) New Jersey Devils vs. (3) Tampa Bay Lightning ====
This was the first playoff meeting between these two teams. The teams split this year's four-game regular season series.

The Devils defeated the Lightning in five games. In game one, Devils goaltender Martin Brodeur stopped all 15 shots he faced in a 3–0 win. Although the Lightning led twice in game two, the Devils were able to tie the score twice and in overtime Jamie Langenbrunner's goal at 2:09 gave New Jersey a 3–2 victory. In game three, Tampa Bay built a 3–0 lead in the first period until New Jersey tied it up in the second period. In the third period, Dave Andreychuk scored the game-winning goal for the Lightning; Tampa Bay won 4–3. Scott Gomez scored a goal and an assist for the Devils in their 3–1 victory over the Lightning in game four. After the teams each scored once in the first period of game five, neither team scored for four consecutive periods, including two overtime periods. Finally at 11:12 of the third overtime, Grant Marshall scored the series winner for the Devils in a 2–1 victory.

April 24	Tampa Bay Lightning	0–3	New Jersey Devils	Continental Airlines Arena	Recap
No Scoring		First period	No Scoring
No Scoring		Second period	No Scoring
No Scoring		Third period	07:41 – Jamie Langenbrunner (6); 11:28 – John Madden (3); 17:09 – Turner Stevenson (1)
Nikolai Khabibulin 29 saves / 32 shots		Goalie stats	Martin Brodeur 15 saves / 15 shots

April 26	Tampa Bay Lightning	2–3	OT	New Jersey Devils	Continental Airlines Arena	Recap
Chris Dingman (1) – 12:25		First period		No Scoring
Martin St. Louis (6) – sh – 19:38		Second period		19:26 – pp – Brian Rafalski (2)
No Scoring		Third period		10:26 – Grant Marshall (1)
No Scoring		First overtime period		02:09 – Jamie Langenbrunner (7)
Nikolai Khabibulin 33 saves / 36 shots		Goalie stats		Martin Brodeur 26 saves / 28 shots

April 28	New Jersey Devils	3–4	Tampa Bay Lightning	St. Pete Times Forum	Recap
No Scoring		First period	04:19 – pp – Vaclav Prospal (4); 09:21 – Martin St. Louis (7); 16:16 – Fredrik Modin (2)
John Madden (4) – pp – 06:38; Grant Marshall (2) – 07:34; Jeff Friesen (2) – 15:06		Second period	No Scoring
No Scoring		Third period	06:08 – Dave Andreychuk (3)
Martin Brodeur 25 saves / 29 shots		Goalie stats	Nikolai Khabibulin 24 saves / 27 shots

April 30	New Jersey Devils	3–1	Tampa Bay Lightning	St. Pete Times Forum	Recap
Scott Gomez (1) – 04:52; Patrik Elias (1) – 16:33		First period	11:30 – Jassen Cullimore (1)
No Scoring		Second period	No Scoring
Scott Stevens (2) – pp – 13:13		Third period	No Scoring
Martin Brodeur 25 saves / 26 shots		Goalie stats	Nikolai Khabibulin 23 saves / 26 shots

May 2	Tampa Bay Lightning	1–2	3OT	New Jersey Devils	Continental Airlines Arena	Recap
Nikita Alexeev (1) – 11:18		First period		13:27 – pp – Scott Niedermayer (2)
No Scoring		Second period		No Scoring
No Scoring		Third period		No Scoring
No Scoring		Third overtime period		11:12 – Grant Marshall (3)
John Grahame 46 saves / 48 shots		Goalie stats		Martin Brodeur 38 saves / 39 shots

New Jersey won series 4–1

=== Western Conference semifinals ===
==== (1) Dallas Stars vs. (7) Mighty Ducks of Anaheim ====
This was the first playoff meeting between these two teams. Dallas won three of the five games in this year's regular season series. Game one is the fifth longest playoff game in NHL history.

The Mighty Ducks defeated the Stars in six games. In game one, Anaheim gained a 3–1 lead midway through the second period, until Dallas tied the score with 2:47 left in the third period. After four scoreless overtime periods, Petr Sykora scored 48 seconds into the fifth overtime to give the Mighty Ducks a 4–3 victory in the fifth-longest game in NHL history. Sykora continued his point streak in game two, assisting on all three goals in a 3–2 overtime win for Anaheim. Jere Lehtinen scored twice for Dallas in game three, closing out a 2–1 win on Marty Turco's 31-save performance. In game four, J.S. Giguere stopped all 28 shots he faced and Mike Leclerc scored the only goal with 1:47 left in the game in a 1–0 affair for the Mighty Ducks. The Dallas Stars stayed alive in game five, forcing a sixth game with two goals from Niko Kapanen. In game six, the Mighty Ducks closed out the series and were able to move onto the Conference Finals on Sandis Ozolinsh's goal which gave Anaheim a 4–3 lead with 1:06 left in the third period.

April 24	Mighty Ducks of Anaheim	4–3	5OT	Dallas Stars	American Airlines Center	Recap
Jason Krog (3) – 13:08		First period		17:39 – Derian Hatcher (1)
Rob Niedermayer (1) – sh – 04:04; Steve Rucchin (2) – 08:58		Second period		16:32 – Jason Arnott (3)
No scoring		Third period		17:13 – Brenden Morrow (1)
Petr Sykora (1) – 00:48		Fifth overtime period		No scoring
Jean-Sebastien Giguere 60 saves / 63 shots		Goalie stats		Marty Turco 50 saves / 54 shots

April 26	Mighty Ducks of Anaheim	3–2	OT	Dallas Stars	American Airlines Center	Recap
Adam Oates (2) – pp – 10:17		First period		19:58 – pp – Brenden Morrow (2)
No scoring		Second period		08:39 – Mike Modano (5)
Rob Niedermayer (2) – 18:51		Third period		No scoring
Mike Leclerc (1) – 01:44		First overtime period		No scoring
Jean-Sebastien Giguere 29 saves / 31 shots Martin Gerber 0 saves / 0 shots		Goalie stats		Marty Turco 24 saves / 27 shots

April 28	Dallas Stars	2–1	Mighty Ducks of Anaheim	Arrowhead Pond of Anaheim	Recap
Jere Lehtinen (2) – 02:24		First period	16:09 – pp – Steve Rucchin (3)
Jere Lehtinen (3) – pp – 03:41		Second period	No scoring
No scoring		Third period	No scoring
Marty Turco 31 saves / 32 shots		Goalie stats	Jean-Sebastien Giguere 30 saves / 32 shots

April 30	Dallas Stars	0–1	Mighty Ducks of Anaheim	Arrowhead Pond of Anaheim	Recap
No scoring		First period	No scoring
No scoring		Second period	No scoring
No scoring		Third period	18:13 – pp – Mike Leclerc (2)
Marty Turco 21 saves / 22 shots		Goalie stats	Jean-Sebastien Giguere 28 saves / 28 shots

May 3	Mighty Ducks of Anaheim	1–4	Dallas Stars	American Airlines Center	Recap
No scoring		First period	09:20 – Rob DiMaio (1); 14:20 – Stu Barnes (2)
No scoring		Second period	18:10 – sh – Niko Kapanen (2)
Paul Kariya (3) – 04:02		Third period	15:12 – Niko Kapanen (3)
Jean-Sebastien Giguere 16 saves / 19 shots Martin Gerber 5 saves / 6 shots		Goalie stats	Marty Turco 14 saves / 15 shots

May 5	Dallas Stars	3–4	Mighty Ducks of Anaheim	Arrowhead Pond of Anaheim	Recap
Kirk Muller (1) – 05:10		First period	No scoring
Niko Kapanen (4) – 14:20		Second period	02:25 – pp – Steve Thomas (2); 04:23 – Stanislav Chistov (3)
Brenden Morrow (3) – pp – 14:49		Third period	03:22 – Ruslan Salei (1); 18:54 – Sandis Ozolinsh (1)
Marty Turco 22 saves / 26 shots		Goalie stats	Jean-Sebastien Giguere 26 saves / 29 shots

Anaheim won series 4–2

==== (4) Vancouver Canucks vs. (6) Minnesota Wild ====
This was the first playoff meeting between these two teams. The teams split this year's five-game regular season series. Both teams had come off of 3–1 comebacks in the first round, and fittingly enough, the same thing happened in this series.

The Minnesota Wild became the first team in NHL history to come back from being down 3–1 twice in one playoff season to win both series in seven games. In game one, Markus Naslund and Trent Klatt each had a goal an assist in Vancouver's 4–3 victory. Minnesota tied the series in game two via Pascal Dupuis's two assists and Marian Gaborik's goal and assist. In game three, Markus Naslund assisted on two of Vancouver's goals. Brent Sopel scored the game-winner in overtime in game four as the Canucks took a 3–1 series lead. Minnesota began their comeback in game five outscoring Vancouver 7–2 with Cliff Ronning scoring two of those goals. Minnesota continued to outscore Vancouver into game six, with Ronning assisting thrice on the Wild's 5–1 effort. In game seven, Vancouver took a 2–0 lead midway through the second period, however, Minnesota's three goals in the third period sealed their fate. Minnesota won the game 4–2 and moved onto the Conference Finals for the first time in franchise history.

April 25	Minnesota Wild	3–4	OT	Vancouver Canucks	General Motors Place	Recap
Sergei Zholtok (1) – 17:08		First period		No scoring
No scoring		Second period		01:33 – sh – Ed Jovanovski (3)
Wes Walz (3) – 02:58; Wes Walz (4) – 08:11		Third period		11:12 – Markus Naslund (5); 19:58 – Matt Cooke (1)
No scoring		First overtime period		03:42 – pp – Trent Klatt (2)
Manny Fernandez 35 saves / 39 shots		Goalie stats		Dan Cloutier 18 saves / 21 shots

April 27	Minnesota Wild	3–2	Vancouver Canucks	General Motors Place	Recap
No scoring		First period	No scoring
Marian Gaborik (5) – 04:40		Second period	17:18 – Ed Jovanovski (4)
Sergei Zholtok (2) – 01:02; Wes Walz (5) – 02:05		Third period	18:28 – Mattias Ohlund (2)
Dwayne Roloson 29 saves / 31 shots		Goalie stats	Dan Cloutier 15 saves / 18 shots

April 29	Vancouver Canucks	3–2	Minnesota Wild	Xcel Energy Center	Recap
Brendan Morrison (3) – pp – 06:25		First period	11:47 – pp – Filip Kuba (3)
Ed Jovanovski (5) – pp – 04:34; Daniel Sedin (1) – pp – 12:33		Second period	10:08 – pp – Marian Gaborik (6)
No scoring		Third period	No scoring
Dan Cloutier 16 saves / 18 shots		Goalie stats	Dwayne Roloson 10 saves / 13 shots

May 2	Vancouver Canucks	3–2	OT	Minnesota Wild	Xcel Energy Center	Recap
No scoring		First period		19:22 – Marian Gaborik (7)
No scoring		Second period		No scoring
Matt Cooke (2) – 02:09; Ed Jovanovski (6) – 17:54		Third period		03:14 – Marian Gaborik (8)
Brent Sopel (2) – pp – 15:52		First overtime period		No scoring
Dan Cloutier 25 saves / 27 shots		Goalie stats		Manny Fernandez 27 saves / 30 shots

May 5	Minnesota Wild	7–2	Vancouver Canucks	General Motors Place	Recap
Richard Park (3) – 03:20		First period	18:13 – Brendan Morrison (4)
Cliff Ronning (1) – pp – 01:08; Jason Marshall (1) – 07:44; Andrew Brunette (4) – 10:16; Marian Gaborik (9) – 12:47; Cliff Ronning (2) – 16:07		Second period	19:17 – Henrik Sedin (3)
Wes Walz (6) – sh – 16:20		Third period	No scoring
Dwayne Roloson 25 saves / 27 shots		Goalie stats	Dan Cloutier 15 saves / 21 shots Alex Auld 4 saves / 5 shots

May 7	Vancouver Canucks	1–5	Minnesota Wild	Xcel Energy Center	Recap
No scoring		First period	No scoring
No scoring		Second period	05:22 – pp – Andrew Brunette (5); 15:31 – pp – Lubomir Sekeras (1)
Ed Jovanovski (7) – pp – 08:57		Third period	06:57 – Darby Hendrickson (1); 09:25 – Antti Laaksonen (1); 10:37 – pp – Andrew Brunette (6)
Dan Cloutier 18 saves / 23 shots		Goalie stats	Dwayne Roloson 30 saves / 31 shots

May 8	Minnesota Wild	4–2	Vancouver Canucks	General Motors Place	Recap
No scoring		First period	No scoring
Pascal Dupuis (3) – 15:30		Second period	11:29 – Mattias Ohlund (3); 12:30 – Todd Bertuzzi (2)
Wes Walz (7) – 08:05; Darby Hendrickson (2) – 14:48; Pascal Dupuis (4) – pp – 17:27		Third period	No scoring
Dwayne Roloson 24 saves / 26 shots		Goalie stats	Dan Cloutier 12 saves / 16 shots

Minnesota won series 4–3

== Conference finals ==
=== Eastern Conference final ===
==== (1) Ottawa Senators vs. (2) New Jersey Devils ====
This was the second playoff meeting between these two teams. Their only previous series was during the 1998 Eastern Conference Quarterfinals which Ottawa won in six games. Ottawa won three of the four games in this year's regular season series.

The Devils defeated the Senators in seven games after giving up a 3–1 series lead. After giving up a 2–0 lead in game one, the Senators won in overtime on Shaun Van Allen's goal giving Ottawa a 3–2 win. In game two, Jay Pandolfo scored a goal and an assist to help the Devils win 4–1. Game three was a low-scoring affair as Sergei Brylin had the only goal in the Devils' 1–0 victory; Martin Brodeur stopped all 24 shots he faced. New Jersey scored three times in the third period to take game four 5–2 and extend their home winning streak to eight games. Jason Spezza had a goal and an assist during game five in the Senators' 3–1 victory forcing a sixth game. In overtime of game six, both teams were deadlocked at one goal each until Chris Phillips scored the game-winner for the Senators becoming the fourth team this season to force a seventh game after facing a 3–1 series deficit. In game seven, Ottawa scored the first goal, but Jamie Langenbrunner, who did not score a goal in this series up until this game, scored twice in the second period. Ottawa tied it up early in the third period on Radek Bonk's goal. The game looked like it was going into overtime, until Jeff Friesen of the Devils gave New Jersey the lead with 2:14 left in the third period. New Jersey hung on for a 3–2 victory, moving onto the Stanley Cup Finals for the fourth time in franchise history, and avoiding the same fates as St. Louis, Colorado, and Vancouver.

May 10	New Jersey Devils	2–3	OT	Ottawa Senators	Corel Centre	Recap
No Scoring		First period		06:10 – Chris Neil (1); 07:23 – Todd White (4)
Joe Nieuwendyk (2) – 14:19; Jay Pandolfo (2) – 16:51		Second period		No Scoring
No Scoring		Third period		No Scoring
No Scoring		First overtime period		03:08 – Shaun Van Allen (1)
Martin Brodeur 27 saves / 30 shots		Goalie stats		Patrick Lalime 32 saves / 34 shots

May 13	New Jersey Devils	4–1	Ottawa Senators	Corel Centre	Recap
Tommy Albelin (1) – 04:15; Jeff Friesen (3) – 17:21		First period	No Scoring
John Madden (5) – 16:33		Second period	02:02 – Radek Bonk (4)
Jay Pandolfo (3) – 14:29		Third period	No Scoring
Martin Brodeur 30 saves / 31 shots		Goalie stats	Patrick Lalime 17 saves / 21 shots

May 15	Ottawa Senators	0–1	New Jersey Devils	Continental Airlines Arena	Recap
No scoring		First period	10:48 – Sergei Brylin (1)
No scoring		Second period	No scoring
No scoring		Third period	No scoring
Patrick Lalime 23 saves / 24 shots		Goalie stats	Martin Brodeur 24 saves / 24 shots

May 17	Ottawa Senators	2–5	New Jersey Devils	Continental Airlines Arena	Recap
Karel Rachunek (1) – 19:45		First period	07:25 – pp – Grant Marshall (4)
Vaclav Varada (2) – 07:08		Second period	16:43 – Jay Pandolfo (4)
No Scoring		Third period	00:41 – pp – Jeff Friesen (4); 04:17 – Patrik Elias (2); 07:35 – sh – John Madden (6)
Patrick Lalime 15 saves / 20 shots		Goalie stats	Martin Brodeur 26 saves / 28 shots

May 19	New Jersey Devils	1–3	Ottawa Senators	Corel Centre	Recap
No Scoring		First period	No Scoring
Scott Stevens (3) – 06:19		Second period	03:59 – sh – Todd White (5)
No Scoring		Third period	07:59 – Martin Havlat (5); 12:28 – pp – Jason Spezza (1)
Martin Brodeur 15 saves / 18 shots		Goalie stats	Patrick Lalime 21 saves / 22 shots

May 21	Ottawa Senators	2–1	OT	New Jersey Devils	Continental Airlines Arena	Recap
No Scoring		First period		No Scoring
Radek Bonk (5) – pp – 17:49		Second period		No Scoring
No Scoring		Third period		02:41 – pp – Joe Nieuwendyk (3)
Chris Phillips (2) – 15:51		First overtime period		No Scoring
Patrick Lalime 30 saves / 31 shots		Goalie stats		Martin Brodeur 32 saves / 34 shots

May 23	New Jersey Devils	3–2	Ottawa Senators	Corel Centre	Recap
No Scoring		First period	03:33 – Magnus Arvedson (1)
Jamie Langenbrunner (8) – 03:52; Jamie Langenbrunner (9) – 05:46		Second period	No Scoring
Jeff Friesen (5) – 17:46		Third period	01:53 – Radek Bonk (6)
Martin Brodeur 24 saves / 26 shots		Goalie stats	Patrick Lalime 24 saves / 27 shots

New Jersey won series 4–3

=== Western Conference final ===
==== (6) Minnesota Wild vs. (7) Mighty Ducks of Anaheim ====
This was the first playoff meeting between these two teams. This was the first Western Conference Final since 1994 to not feature either the Detroit Red Wings or Colorado Avalanche. This was the first Conference Finals appearance for both teams; the Mighty Ducks made the Conference Finals in their tenth season, while the Wild did so in their third season; the teams entered the NHL in 1993 and 2000, respectively. Anaheim won this year's four-game regular season series earning five of eight points.

Anaheim earned their second four-game sweep this playoffs season. Anaheim also only allowed one goal in the four games they played against Minnesota setting an NHL record for the fewest goals allowed by one team in a playoff series. In game one, Petr Sykora scored the only goal of the game in the second overtime period. Jean-Sebastien Giguere stopped all 39 shots he faced. Kurt Sauer and Rob Niedermayer both scored short-handed goals in game two as the Mighty Ducks shut out the Wild again, this time 2–0. Paul Kariya scored twice in game three, and J.S. Giguere shut out the Wild for the third time this series, stopping 35 shots, bringing his total consecutive shutout time to 213 minutes and 17 seconds. Determined to score, Minnesota got on the board for the first time since game seven of the Conference Semifinals when Andrew Brunette scored on a power-play. However, Anaheim followed up by scoring two power-play goals themselves, both by Adam Oates. The score remained 2–1 as the Mighty Ducks moved onto the Stanley Cup Finals for the first time in their history. To date, this remains the Wild's only appearance in the Western Conference final.

May 10	Mighty Ducks of Anaheim	1–0	2OT	Minnesota Wild	Xcel Energy Center	Recap
No scoring		First period		No scoring
No scoring		Second period		No scoring
No scoring		Third period		No scoring
Petr Sykora (2) – 08:06		Second overtime period		No scoring
Jean-Sebastien Giguere 39 saves / 39 shots		Goalie stats		Manny Fernandez 25 saves / 26 shots

May 12	Mighty Ducks of Anaheim	2–0	Minnesota Wild	Xcel Energy Center	Recap
No scoring		First period	No scoring
Kurt Sauer (1) – sh – 07:24		Second period	No scoring
Rob Niedermayer (3) – sh – 08:06		Third period	No scoring
Jean-Sebastien Giguere 24 saves / 24 shots		Goalie stats	Dwayne Roloson 20 saves / 22 shots

May 14	Minnesota Wild	0–4	Mighty Ducks of Anaheim	Arrowhead Pond of Anaheim	Recap
No scoring		First period	04:59 – Steve Rucchin (4)
No scoring		Second period	08:20 – Paul Kariya (4); 12:16 – Stanislav Chistov (4); 13:51 – Paul Kariya (5)
No scoring		Third period	No scoring
Dwayne Roloson 13 saves / 16 shots Manny Fernandez 15 saves / 16 shots		Goalie stats	Jean-Sebastien Giguere 35 saves / 35 shots

May 16	Minnesota Wild	1–2	Mighty Ducks of Anaheim	Arrowhead Pond of Anaheim	Recap
Andrew Brunette (7) – pp – 04:37		First period	08:30 – pp – Adam Oates (3)
No scoring		Second period	09:31 – pp – Adam Oates (4)
No scoring		Third period	No scoring
Manny Fernandez 26 saves / 28 shots		Goalie stats	Jean-Sebastien Giguere 24 saves / 25 shots

Anaheim won series 4–0

== Stanley Cup Finals ==
This was the first playoff series between these two teams. New Jersey made their fourth appearance in the Finals, they last made the Finals in 2001, where they lost to the Colorado Avalanche in seven games. Anaheim made their first Finals appearance in their tenth season since entering the league in 1993–94. New Jersey won both games during this year's two-game regular season series.

This was only the third time in NHL history and the first time since 1965 that the home team won all the games in the Stanley Cup Finals.

May 27	Mighty Ducks of Anaheim	0–3	New Jersey Devils	Continental Airlines Arena	Recap
No Scoring		First period	No Scoring
No Scoring		Second period	01:45 – Jeff Friesen (6)
No Scoring		Third period	05:34 – Grant Marshall (5); 19:38 – en – Jeff Friesen (7)
Jean-Sebastien Giguere 27 saves / 29 shots		Goalie stats	Martin Brodeur 16 saves / 16 shots

May 29	Mighty Ducks of Anaheim	0–3	New Jersey Devils	Continental Airlines Arena	Recap
No Scoring		First period	No Scoring
No Scoring		Second period	04:42 – pp – Patrik Elias (3); 12:11 – Scott Gomez (2)
No Scoring		Third period	04:22 – Jeff Friesen (8)
Jean-Sebastien Giguere 22 saves / 25 shots		Goalie stats	Martin Brodeur 16 saves / 16 shots

May 31	New Jersey Devils	2–3	OT	Mighty Ducks of Anaheim	Arrowhead Pond of Anaheim	Recap
No Scoring		First period		No Scoring
Patrik Elias (4) – 14:02		Second period		03:39 – Marc Chouinard (1); 14:47 – Sandis Ozolinsh (2)
Scott Gomez (3) – 09:11		Third period		No Scoring
No Scoring		First overtime period		06:59 – Ruslan Salei (2)
Martin Brodeur 30 saves / 33 shots		Goalie stats		Jean-Sebastien Giguere 29 saves / 31 shots

June 2	New Jersey Devils	0–1	OT	Mighty Ducks of Anaheim	Arrowhead Pond of Anaheim	Recap
No Scoring		First period		No Scoring
No Scoring		Second period		No Scoring
No Scoring		Third period		No Scoring
No Scoring		First overtime period		00:39 – Steve Thomas (3)
Martin Brodeur 25 saves / 26 shots		Goalie stats		Jean-Sebastien Giguere 26 saves / 26 shots

June 5	Mighty Ducks of Anaheim	3–6	New Jersey Devils	Continental Airlines Arena	Recap
Petr Sykora (3) – 00:42; Steve Rucchin (5) – 12:50		First period	03:35 – Pascal Rheaume (1); 07:45 – pp – Patrik Elias (5)
Samuel Pahlsson (2) – 06:35		Second period	03:12 – Brian Gionta (1); 09:02 – Jay Pandolfo (5)
No Scoring		Third period	05:39 – Jamie Langenbrunner (10); 12:52 – Jamie Langenbrunner (11)
Jean-Sebastien Giguere 31 saves / 37 shots		Goalie stats	Martin Brodeur 20 saves / 23 shots

June 7	New Jersey Devils	2–5	Mighty Ducks of Anaheim	Arrowhead Pond of Anaheim	Recap
No Scoring		First period	04:26 – Steve Rucchin (6); 13:42 – Steve Rucchin (7); 15:59 – pp – Steve Thomas (4)
Jay Pandolfo (6) – 02:18		Second period	17:15 – Paul Kariya (6)
Grant Marshall (6) – pp – 10:46		Third period	03:57 – pp – Petr Sykora (4)
Martin Brodeur 17 saves / 22 shots Corey Schwab 2 saves / 2 shots		Goalie stats	Jean-Sebastien Giguere 26 saves / 28 shots

June 9	Mighty Ducks of Anaheim	0–3	New Jersey Devils	Continental Airlines Arena	Recap
No Scoring		First period	No Scoring
No Scoring		Second period	02:22 – Michael Rupp (1); 12:18 – Jeff Friesen (9)
No Scoring		Third period	16:16 – Jeff Friesen (10)
Jean-Sebastien Giguere 22 saves / 25 shots		Goalie stats	Martin Brodeur 24 saves / 24 shots

New Jersey won series 4–3

== Player statistics ==
There was a tie for the playoff point lead between Jamie Langenbrunner and Scott Niedermayer, both of the New Jersey Devils and both with 18 points. Langenbrunner led the playoffs with 11 goals and Niedermayer led the playoffs with 16 assists. The 18 points to lead the playoffs was the lowest total since the 1968–69 season.

=== Skaters ===
GP = Games played; G = Goals; A = Assists; Pts = Points; +/– = Plus/minus; PIM = Penalty minutes

Player	Team	GP	G	A	Pts	+/–	PIM
Jamie Langenbrunner	New Jersey Devils	24	11	7	18	+11	16
Scott Niedermayer	New Jersey Devils	24	2	16	18	+11	16
Marian Gaborik	Minnesota Wild	18	9	8	17	+2	6
John Madden	New Jersey Devils	24	6	10	16	+10	2
Marian Hossa	Ottawa Senators	18	5	11	16	–1	6
Mike Modano	Dallas Stars	12	5	10	15	+2	4
Jeff Friesen	New Jersey Devils	24	10	4	14	+10	6
Markus Naslund	Vancouver Canucks	14	5	9	14	–6	18
Sergei Zubov	Dallas Stars	12	4	10	14	+2	4

=== Goaltending ===
These are the top six goaltenders based on either goals against average or save percentage with at least four games played.

GP = Games played; W = Wins; L = Losses; SA = Shots against; GA = Goals against; GAA = Goals against average; TOI = Time On Ice (minutes:seconds); Sv% = Save percentage; SO = Shutouts

Player	Team	GP	W	L	SA	GA	GAA	TOI	Sv%	SO
Jean-Sebastien Giguere	Mighty Ducks of Anaheim	21	15	6	697	38	1.62	1407:02	.945	5
Martin Brodeur	New Jersey Devils	24	16	8	622	41	1.65	1490:34	.934	7
Manny Fernandez	Minnesota Wild	9	3	4	253	18	1.96	552:22	.929	0
Olaf Kolzig	Washington Capitals	6	2	4	192	14	2.08	403:55	.927	1
Patrick Lalime	Ottawa Senators	18	11	7	449	34	1.82	1122:22	.924	1
Marty Turco	Dallas Stars	12	6	6	310	25	1.88	798:16	.919	0

== See also ==
- 2002–03 NHL season
- 2003 in sports
- List of NHL seasons

Preceded by 2002 Stanley Cup playoffs	Stanley Cup playoffs	Succeeded by 2004 Stanley Cup playoffs
