= List of Olympic men's ice hockey players for Australia =

Australia men's national ice hockey team

The list of Olympic men's ice hockey players for Australia consists of 15 skaters and 2 goaltenders. Men's ice hockey tournaments have been staged at the Olympic Games since 1920 (it was introduced at the 1920 Summer Olympics, and was permanently added to the Winter Olympic Games in 1924). Australia has participated in one tournament, the 1960 Winter Olympics, where they finished last of the nine nations competing.

David Cunningham scored the most goals (4) and had the most points (6), while Russell Jones had the most assists (3).

== Key ==
General terms
Term	Definition
GP	Games played
Ref(s)	Reference(s)

Goaltender statistical abbreviations
Abbreviation	Definition
W	Wins
L	Losses
T	Ties
Min	Minutes played
SO	Shutouts
GA	Goals against
GAA	Goals against average

Skater statistical abbreviations
Abbreviation	Definition
G	Goals
A	Assists
P	Points
PIM	Penalty minutes

== Goaltenders ==
Goaltenders
Player	GP	W	L	T	Min	SO	GA	GAA	Ref(s)
Noel McLoughlin	3	0	1	0	120	0	21	10.50	
Robert Reid	5	0	5	0	240	0	66	16.50	

== Skaters ==
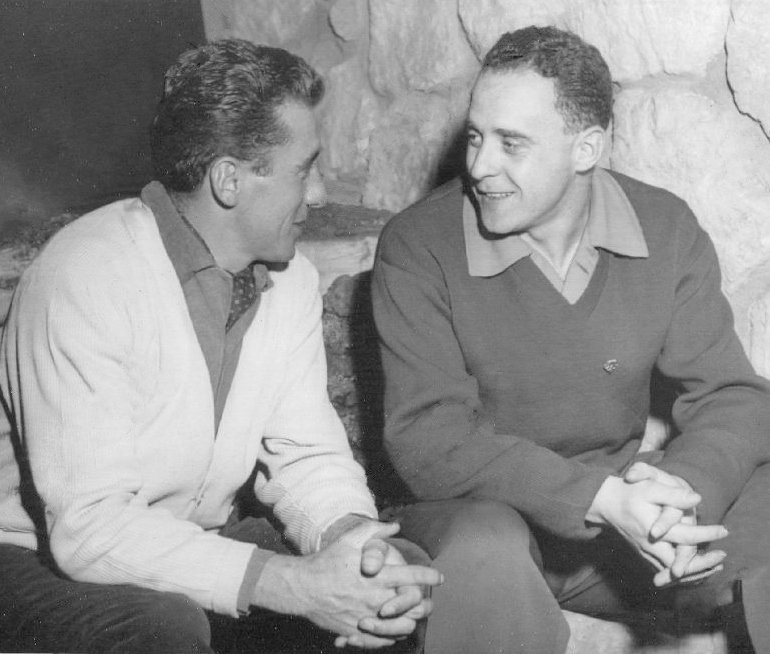
Steve Tikal (left) played one game for Australia at the 1960 Winter Olympics. His brother, František (right), played at the same tournament, but for Czechoslovakia.

Skaters
Player	GP	G	A	P	PIM	Ref(s)
Ben Acton	5	0	0	0	11	
Ronald Amess	5	0	0	0	2	
David Cunningham	5	4	2	6	4	
Noel Derrick	6	2	1	3	2	
Vic Ekberg	6	0	2	2	0	
Basil Hansen	4	1	0	1	4	
Clive Hitch	6	0	0	0	0	
Russell Jones	6	2	3	5	4	
John Nicholas	6	0	0	0	16	
Peter Parrott	4	0	0	0	0	
Ken Pawley	3	0	0	0	0	
John Thomas	6	1	0	1	6	
Steve Tikal	1	0	0	0	0	
Ivo Veseley	2	0	0	0	2	
Ken Wellman	6	0	0	0	6	

== See also ==
- Australia men's national ice hockey team
