= Tikal (surname) =

Tikal (feminine: Tikalová) is a Czech surname. Notable people with the surname include:

- František Tikal (1933–2008), Czechoslovak ice hockey player
- Ladislav Tikal (1905–1980), Czechoslovak gymnast
- Oldřich Tikal (born 1938), Czech rower
- Václav Tikal (1906–1965), Czechoslovak painter and ceramic artist
- Zdeněk Tikal (1929–1991), Australian ice hockey player
