= Tikal (disambiguation) =

Tikal is the largest of the ancient ruined cities of the Maya civilization.

Tikal may also refer to:

- Tikal the Echidna, a character in Sega's Sonic the Hedgehog series
- Tikal (board game)
- MS Tikal, an Irish Sea ferry
- Tikal (surname)

== See also ==
- Tical (disambiguation)
- TiHKAL, a 1997 book Alexander Shulgin and Ann Shulgin
- Tilak, a forehead mark
