= Robert Reichel =

Czech ice hockey player and coach (b. 1971)

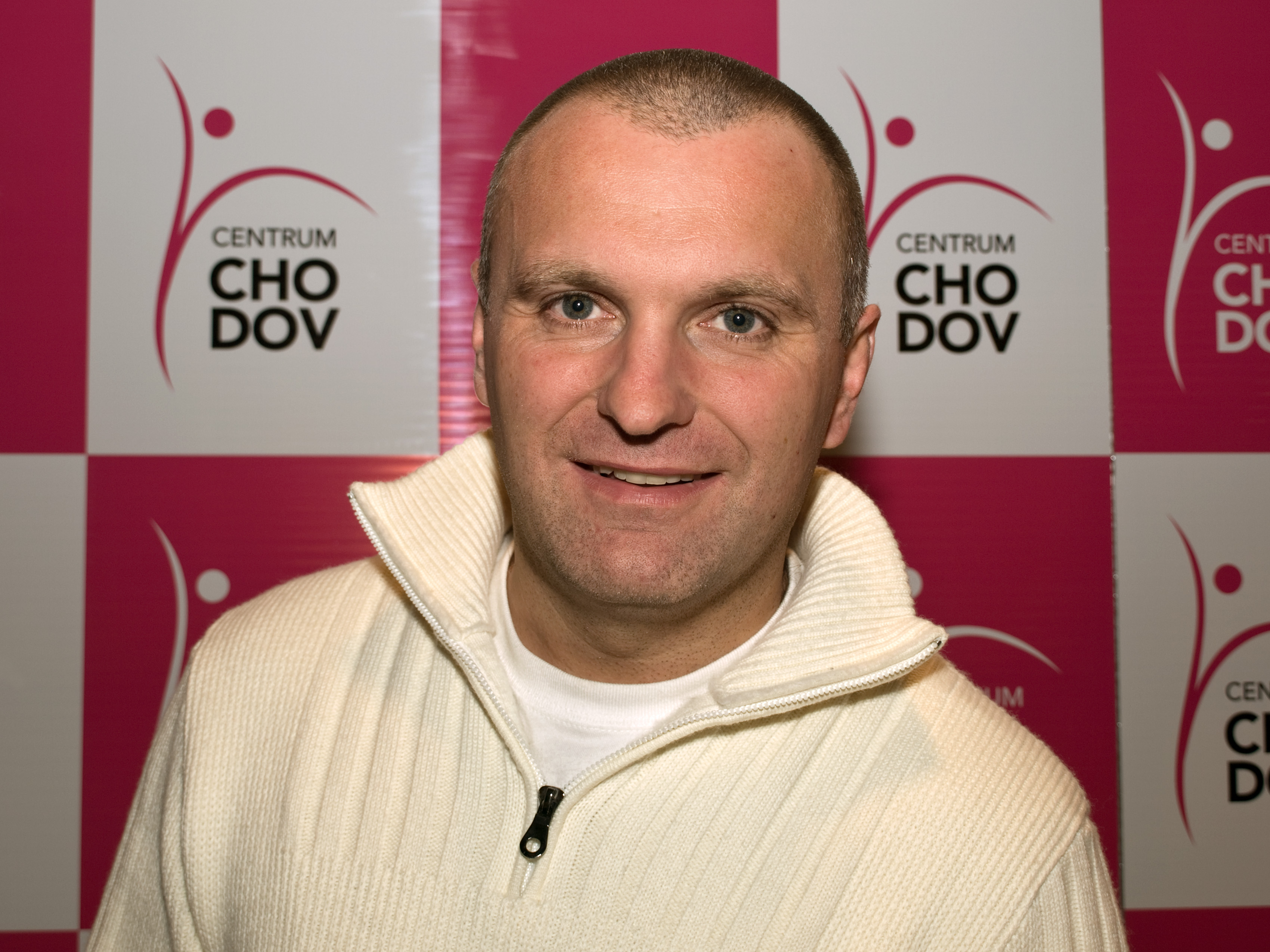
- Reichel in 2010
- Born: June 25, 1971 (age 55) Litvínov, Czechoslovakia
- Height: 5 ft 10 in (178 cm)
- Weight: 182 lb (83 kg; 13 st 0 lb)
- Position: Centre
- Shot: Left
- Played for: HC Litvínov; Calgary Flames; Frankfurt Lions; New York Islanders; Phoenix Coyotes; Toronto Maple Leafs
- National team: Czechoslovakia and Czech Republic
- NHL draft: 70th overall, 1989; Calgary Flames
- Playing career: 1987–2010

Robert Reichel (born June 25, 1971) is a Czech former professional ice hockey centre and coach. He began his career with HC Litvínov of the Czechoslovak First Ice Hockey League; his 49 goals in 1989–90 was the second highest total in Czechoslovak history. Reichel played 11 National Hockey League (NHL) seasons for the Calgary Flames, New York Islanders, Phoenix Coyotes and Toronto Maple Leafs. In 830 career NHL games, he scored 252 goals and 378 assists for 630 points. He also played with the Frankfurt Lions of the Deutsche Eishockey Liga (DEL). He ended his player career in 2010 in HC Litvínov, where he served as captain of the team.

Internationally, Reichel represented Czechoslovakia and later the Czech Republic on numerous occasions. He was an all-star at the European Junior, World Junior and World Championship levels and appeared in Canada Cup and World Cup of Hockey tournaments. He was a member of three gold and four bronze medal teams at the World Championships. A two-time Olympian, Reichel scored the lone shootout goal to eliminate Canada en route to a gold medal victory for the Czech Republic at the 1998 Winter Olympics. He was inducted into the IIHF Hall of Fame in 2015.

== Playing career ==
=== Litvínov, Calgary and New York ===
Reichel began his elite playing career at the age of 16 when he joined CHZ Litvínov of the Czechoslovak First Ice Hockey League. In his first two seasons, he recorded 27 points in 1987–88 and 48 points in 1988–89. Anticipating future availability of eastern European players to their teams, National Hockey League (NHL) general managers selected several Soviet Bloc players at the 1989 NHL entry draft. Reichel was selected in the fourth round, 70th overall, by the Calgary Flames. Reichel remained with Litvínov for the 1989–90 season where he had one of the greatest seasons in Czechoslovak history; in 52 games combined between the regular season and playoffs, Reichel scored 49 goals, the second highest total in the history of the Czechoslovak First League. He was named an all-star and forward of the year and finished as runner-up to Dominik Hašek as player of the year.

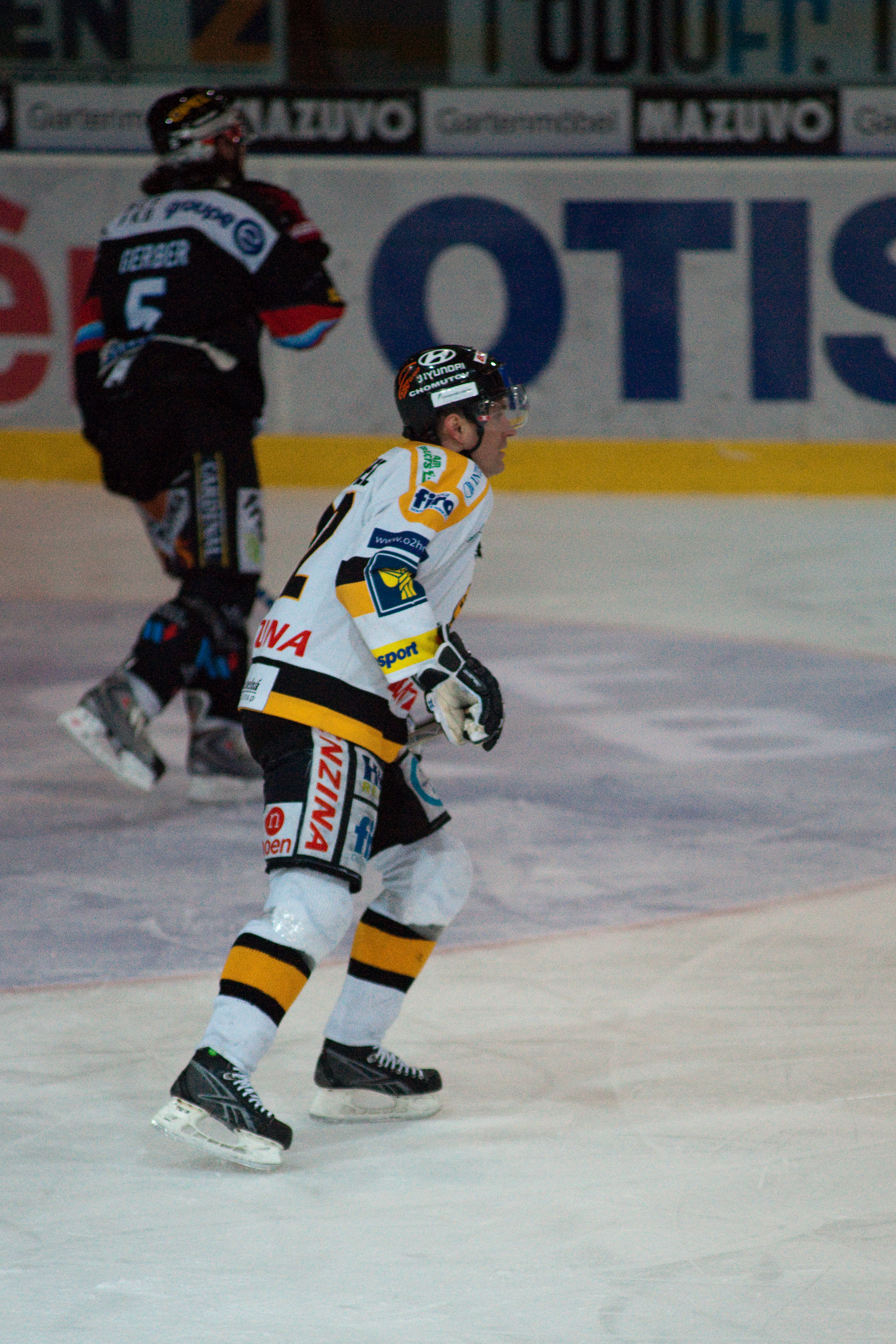
Reichel as a member of Litvínov in 2010

Upon his departure to Calgary for the 1990–91 NHL season, Reichel was considered Czechoslovakia's top prospect. He made his NHL debut on October 8, 1990, against the Winnipeg Jets and scored his first point and goal on October 20, against Boston Bruins' goaltender Réjean Lemelin. Reichel completed his first NHL season with 41 points, then improved to 54 points in 1991–92. A pair of 40-goal seasons followed as Reichel finished second in team scoring (88 points to Theoren Fleury's 100) in 1992–93 and led the team with 93 points in 1993–94.

A labour dispute resulted in the cancellation of the first half of the 1994–95 NHL season, and Reichel spent the time with the Frankfurt Lions of the Deutsche Eishockey Liga (DEL). He recorded 43 points in 21 games for Frankfurt before returning to the NHL, where he added 35 points in 48 games for Calgary. Reichel then became embroiled in a contract dispute with the Flames. He made C$ 725,000 in 1994–95, and was offered US$1 million to remain with Frankfurt. Unable to come to terms with Calgary, Reichel returned to Frankfurt for the 1995–96 season. In 46 games with the Lions, Reichel led the DEL in goals (47), assists (54) and points (101).

Reichel and the Flames resolved their impasse prior to the 1996–97 NHL season and agreed to a three-year, US$4.4 million contract. He struggled offensively in his return to Calgary, Reichel had only 16 goals and 43 points through 70 games with Calgary, and consequently became the subject of trade rumours. The Flames sent him to the New York Islanders on March 18, 1997, in exchange for Marty McInnis, Tyrone Garner and a sixth round selection in the 1997 NHL entry draft. In 12 games with the Islanders to finish the season, Reichel recorded 19 points and finished the year with 62 combined between the two teams.

=== Phoenix, Toronto and Litvínov ===
Reichel played only one full season with the Islanders; he recorded 25 goals and 40 assists in 1997–98, and was traded midway through the 1998–99. New York sent Reichel to the Phoenix Coyotes on March 20, 1999, in exchange for Brad Isbister. The teams also swapped draft picks. A restricted free agent following the season, Reichel sought a contract worth $3 million per season. When he was unable to attract interest at that price, Reichel opted to return to Litvínov, now in the Czech Extraliga.

He played two seasons with Litvínov and averaged greater than a point per game. Reichel once again returned to North America as the Coyotes traded his NHL playing rights to the Toronto Maple Leafs, along with Travis Green and Craig Mills, in exchange for Danny Markov on June 12, 2001. In his first season with the Maple Leafs, 2001–02, he scored 20 goals – the seventh time in his NHL career he had done so – and 51 points. His production declined over the following two seasons, recording 42 points in 2002–03 and 30 in 2003–04. Reichel then left the NHL for the third, and final, time. He spent the final six seasons of his playing career with Litvínov and posted a peak offensive total of 47 points in 52 games in 2006–07. Reichel retired in 2010.

=== International ===
Medal record

Men's ice hockey

Representing Czechoslovakia

European Junior Championship
Gold medal – first place	1988 Czechoslovakia	
Silver medal – second place	1989 Soviet Union	

World Junior Championship
Bronze medal – third place	1989 USA	
Bronze medal – third place	1990 Finland	

World Championship
Bronze medal – third place	1990 Switzerland	
Bronze medal – third place	1992 Czechoslovakia	

Representing Czech Republic

World Championship
Gold medal – first place	1996 Austria	
Bronze medal – third place	1997 Finland	
Bronze medal – third place	1998 Switzerland	
Gold medal – first place	2000 Russia	
Gold medal – first place	2001 Germany	

Olympic Games
Gold medal – first place	1998 Nagano	

Reichel was a mainstay on the Czechoslovakia and later the Czech Republic national teams from 1987 until 2004. He played with the junior team in five tournaments between 1988 and 1990. He was a member of gold and silver medal squads at the 1988 and 1989 European Junior Championships, respectively. In 1989, he set a tournament record with 21 points in six games. Reichel also appeared in three World Junior Championships between 1988 and 1990 and won a pair of bronze medals. He led the 1990 World Junior Ice Hockey Championships in scoring with 21 points. In doing so, he became the only player in history to lead both the European and World Junior Championships in scoring. He was named a tournament all-star and received the Directorate Award as best forward. With 40 points over his three tournaments, Reichel became the all-time leading scorer (since surpassed) at the World Junior Championships.

Having earned a spot with the senior team at the 1990 World Championships, Reichel was placed on a line with two other young players, Bobby Holík and Jaromír Jágr. The line starred at the event; Reichel recorded 11 points in the tournament as Czechoslovakia won the bronze medal. Reichel was named to the tournament all-star team. Two more all-star appearances followed, in 1996 and 2001, The Czech Republic won gold medals both years; Reichel was also a member of the World Championship winning team in 2000 and won three additional bronze medals. Reichel appeared in nine World Championships, the 1991 Canada Cup and two World Cup of Hockey tournaments. His final appearance came at the 2004 World Cup of Hockey where he captained the Czech Republic to a semi-final appearance.

Reichel's most famous international moment came in the first of his two Olympic appearances in one of the most significant moments in Czech hockey history. Canada and the Czech republic battled to a 1–1 tie in the semi-final at the 1998 Nagano Games, a contest that ultimately required a shootout to decide the game. Reichel scored the lone goal and Dominik Hašek stopped all Canadian shots to lead the Czech Republic into the gold medal game. The Czechs went on to defeat Russia in the final to win the nation's first Olympic gold medal. The victory touched off celebrations throughout the Czech Republic.

== Personal life ==
Reichel was born in Litvínov, Czechoslovakia and is of Sudeten-German descent. His brother Martin was also a professional hockey player. Martin, who moved to Germany in 1990, represented his adopted nation at the 2002 Winter Olympics and played against Robert's Czech Republic. It was the second time in Olympic hockey history that two brothers played against each other (at 1960 Winter Olympics, František Tikal, also of Czechoslovakia, played against his brother Zdeněk, who represented Australia). His nephew Lukas Reichel is also a hockey player and was drafted by the Chicago Blackhawks in the first round of the 2020 NHL entry draft. His son Kristian Reichel, also a hockey player, plays for the Winnipeg Jets affiliate Manitoba Moose.

== Career statistics ==
=== Regular season and playoffs ===
			Regular season					Playoffs
Season	Team	League	GP	G	A	Pts	PIM	GP	G	A	Pts	PIM
1987–88	TJ CHZ Litvínov	TCH	36	17	10	27	8	—	—	—	—	—
1988–89	TJ CHZ Litvínov	TCH	44	23	25	48	32	—	—	—	—	—
1989–90	TJ CHZ Litvínov	TCH	52	49	34	83	—	—	—	—	—	—
1990–91	Calgary Flames	NHL	66	19	22	41	22	6	1	1	2	0
1991–92	Calgary Flames	NHL	77	20	34	54	32	—	—	—	—	—
1992–93	Calgary Flames	NHL	80	40	48	88	54	6	2	4	6	2
1993–94	Calgary Flames	NHL	84	40	53	93	58	7	0	5	5	0
1994–95	Frankfurt Lions	DEL	21	19	24	43	41	—	—	—	—	—
1994–95	Calgary Flames	NHL	48	18	17	35	28	7	2	4	6	4
1995–96	Frankfurt Lions	DEL	46	47	54	101	84	—	—	—	—	—
1996–97	Calgary Flames	NHL	70	16	27	43	22	—	—	—	—	—
1996–97	New York Islanders	NHL	12	5	14	19	4	—	—	—	—	—
1997–98	New York Islanders	NHL	82	25	40	65	32	—	—	—	—	—
1998–99	New York Islanders	NHL	70	19	37	56	50	—	—	—	—	—
1998–99	Phoenix Coyotes	NHL	13	7	6	13	4	7	1	3	4	2
1999–2000	HC Chemopetrol, a.s.	ELH	45	25	32	57	24	7	3	4	7	2
2000–01	HC Chemopetrol, a.s.	ELH	49	23	33	56	72	5	1	2	3	2
2001–02	Toronto Maple Leafs	NHL	78	20	31	51	26	18	0	3	3	4
2002–03	Toronto Maple Leafs	NHL	81	12	30	42	26	7	2	1	3	0
2003–04	Toronto Maple Leafs	NHL	69	11	19	30	30	12	0	2	2	8
2004–05	HC Chemopetrol, a.s.	ELH	32	9	19	28	32	—	—	—	—	—
2005–06	HC Chemopetrol, a.s.	ELH	52	11	26	37	50	—	—	—	—	—
2006–07	HC Chemopetrol, a.s.	ELH	52	26	21	47	46	—	—	—	—	—
2007–08	HC Litvínov	ELH	51	23	7	30	62	5	1	0	1	0
2008–09	HC Litvínov	ELH	47	14	31	45	72	1	0	0	0	2
2009–10	HC Litvínov	ELH	52	13	28	41	88	5	3	4	7	0
TCH totals			132	89	69	137	—	—	—	—	—	—
NHL totals			830	252	378	630	388	70	8	23	31	20
ELH totals			382	145	197	342	450	23	8	10	18	6

=== International ===
Year	Team	Event	GP	G	A	Pts	PIM
1988	Czechoslovakia	WJC	7	3	8	11	2
1988	Czechoslovakia	EJC	6	8	4	12	6
1989	Czechoslovakia	WJC	7	4	4	8	4
1989	Czechoslovakia	EJC	6	14	7	21	22
1990	Czechoslovakia	WJC	7	11	10	21	4
1990	Czechoslovakia	WC	10	5	6	11	4
1991	Czechoslovakia	WC	8	2	4	6	10
1991	Czechoslovakia	CC	5	1	2	3	6
1992	Czechoslovakia	WC	8	1	3	4	2
1996	Czech Republic	WC	8	4	4	8	0
1996	Czech Republic	WCH	3	1	0	1	0
1997	Czech Republic	WC	9	1	4	5	4
1998	Czech Republic	Oly	6	3	0	3	0
1998	Czech Republic	WC	8	0	4	4	0
2000	Czech Republic	WC	9	2	3	5	4
2001	Czech Republic	WC	9	5	7	12	4
2002	Czech Republic	Oly	4	1	0	1	2
2003	Czech Republic	WC	8	4	4	8	2
2004	Czech Republic	WCH	4	0	0	0	2
Junior totals			33	40	33	73	38
Senior totals			99	30	41	71	40

== Awards and honours ==
Award	Year	Ref.
EJC all-star team	1988; 1989	
WJC Directorate Award for best forward	1990	
WJC all-star team	1990	
Czechoslovak first all-star team	1989–90	
World Championship all-star team	1990, 1996; 2001	
IIHF Hall of Fame	2015	
