= 1989 IIHF European U18 Championship =

The 1989 IIHF European U18 Championship was the twenty-second playing of the IIHF European Junior Championships.

== Group A ==
Played April 2–10, 1989 in Kyiv, USSR.

=== First round ===
Group 1

Team	TCH	SWE	FRG	NOR	GF/GA	Points
1. Czechoslovakia		10:5	10:3	18:4	38:12	6
2. Sweden	5:10		4:3	9:3	18:18	4
3. West Germany	3:10	3:4		6:4	12:18	2
4. Norway	4:18	3:9	4:6		11:33	0

Group 2

Team	URS	FIN	SUI	ROM	GF/GA	Points
1. Soviet Union		4:2	13:2	15:0	32:4	6
2. Finland	2:4		17:0	8:0	27:4	4
3. Switzerland	2:13	0:17		9:2	11:32	2
4. Romania	0:15	0:8	2:9		2:32	0

=== Final round ===
Championship round

Team	URS	TCH	FIN	SWE	BRD	SUI	GF/GA	Points
1. Soviet Union		2:0	(4:2)	4:2	7:1	(13:2)	30:7	10
2. Czechoslovakia	0:2		4:3	(10:5)	(10:3)	19:1	43:14	8
3. Finland	(2:4)	3:4		5:5	15:1	(17:0)	42:14	5
4. Sweden	2:4	(5:10)	5:5		(4:3)	14:0	30:22	5
5. West Germany	1:7	(3:10)	1:15	(3:4)		4:2	12:38	2
6. Switzerland	(2:13)	1:19	(0:17)	0:14	2:4		5:67	0

7th place

Norway	12:4	5:0	Romania

Romania was relegated to Group B for 1990

== Tournament Awards ==
- Top Scorer (Czechoslovakia) Robert Reichel (21 points)-A tournament Record
- Top Goalie: (Soviet Union) Sergei Tkachenko
- Top Defenceman: (Czechoslovakia) Jiří Vykoukal
- Top Forward: (Soviet Union) Pavel Bure

== Group B ==
Played March 17–23, 1989 in Klagenfurt, Austria.

=== First round ===
Group 1

Team	POL	DEN	ITA	BUL	GF/GA	Points
1. Poland		6:0	8:2	15:0	29:2	6
2. Denmark	0:6		8:3	6:2	14:11	4
3. Italy	2:8	3:8		6:3	11:19	2
4. Bulgaria	0:15	2:6	3:6		5:27	0

Group 2

Team	FRA	AUT	NED	YUG	GF/GA	Points
1. France		4:3	10:1	6:3	20:7	6
2. Austria	3:4		5:2	12:1	20:7	4
3. Netherlands	1:10	2:5		4:4	7:19	1
4. Yugoslavia	3:6	1:12	4:4		8:22	1

=== Final round ===
Championship round

Team	POL	FRA	AUT	DEN	GF/GA	Points
1. Poland		7:4	8:1	(6:0)	21:6	6
2. France	4:7		(4:3)	5:1	13:11	4
3. Austria	1:8	(3:4)		3:3	7:15	1
4. Denmark	(0:6)	1:5	3:3		4:14	1

Placing round

Team	NED	ITA	YUG	BUL	GF/GA	Points
1. Netherlands		5:3	(4:4)	8:4	17:11	5
2. Italy	3:5		7:2	(6:3)	16:10	4
3. Yugoslavia	(4:4)	2:7		8:2	14:13	3
4. Bulgaria	4:8	(3:6)	2:8		9:22	0

Poland was promoted to Group A and Bulgaria was relegated to Group C, for 1990.

== Group C ==
Played March 25–30, 1989 in Puigcerdá, Spain.

Team	ESP	GBR	HUN	GF/GA	Points
1. Spain		5:2; 2:2	6:5; 6:4	19:13	7
2. Great Britain	2:5; 2:2		5:2; 6:1	15:10	5
3. Hungary	5:6; 4:6	2:5; 1:6		12:23	0

Spain was promoted to Group B for 1990.
