= Včelná =

- Municipality
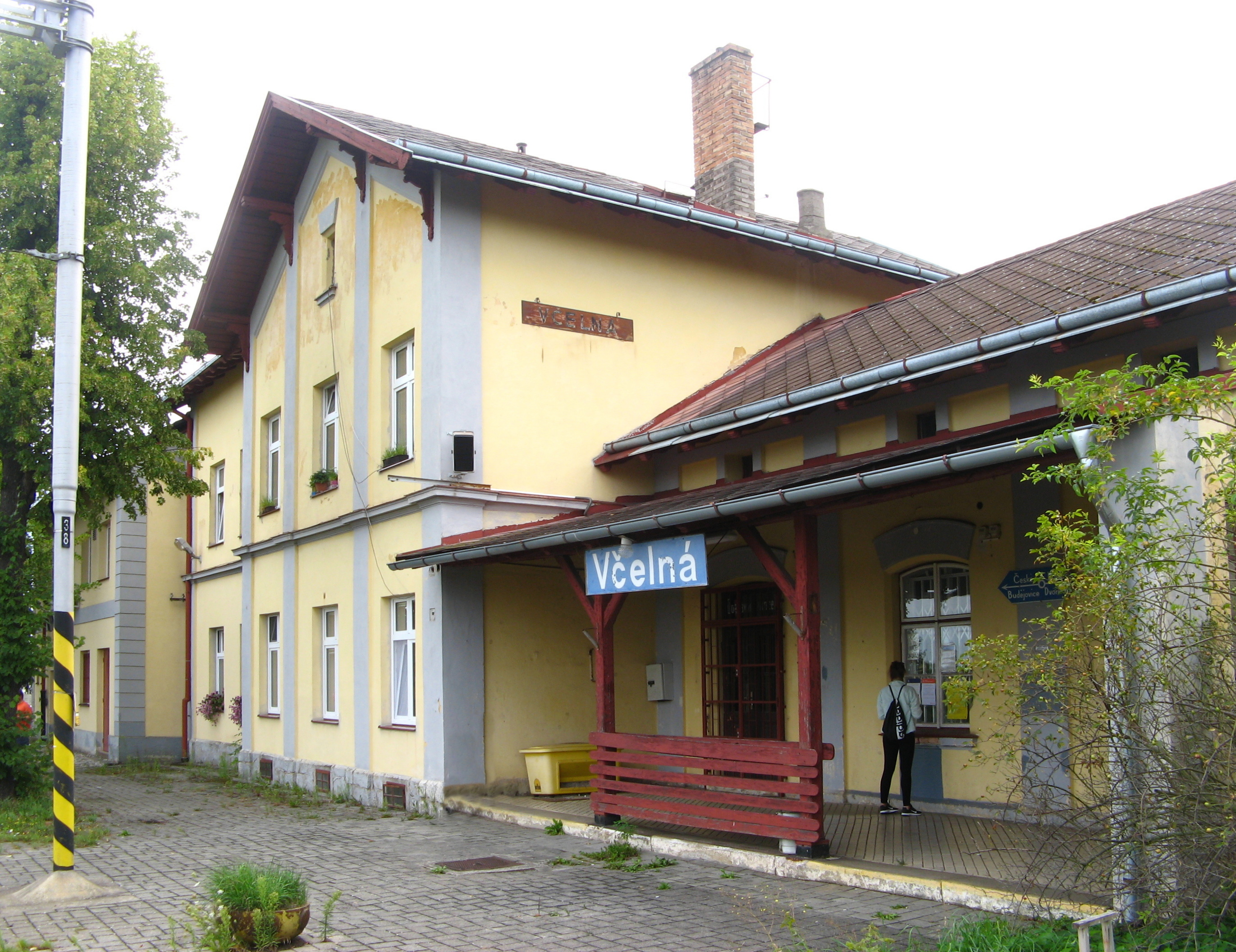
- Railway station

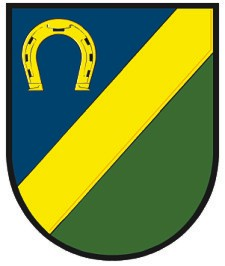
- Flag Coat of arms

- Location in the Czech Republic
- Coordinates: 48°55′26″N 14°27′14″E
- Country: Czech Republic
- Region: South Bohemian
- District: České Budějovice
- Founded: 1784

Area
  - Total: 3.71 km^{2} (1.43 sq mi)
- Elevation: 438 m (1,437 ft)

Population (2026-01-01)
  - Total: 2,286
  - Density: 616/km^{2} (1,600/sq mi)
- Time zone: UTC+1 (CET)
  - Summer (DST): UTC+2 (CEST)
- Postal code: 373 82
- Website: www.vcelna.cz

Včelná is a municipality and village in České Budějovice District in the South Bohemian Region of the Czech Republic. It has about 2,300 inhabitants.

== Etymology ==
The name is derived from the Czech word včela ('bee'). It referred to "a village where beekeeping is abundant".

== Geography ==
Včelná is located about 3 kilometres (2 mi) south of České Budějovice. It lies on the border between the České Budějovice Basin and Gratzen Foothills. The highest point is at 481 m (1,578 ft) above sea level.

== History ==
Včelná was spontaneously founded in 1784 by the newly built Imperial road from České Budějovice to Linz. Until 1930, Včelná was a municipal part of Poříčí (today a part of Boršov nad Vltavou). From 1930, it has been a separate municipality.

== Demographics ==
Historical population

Year	Pop.	±%
1869	393	—
1880	468	+19.1%
1890	511	+9.2%
1900	551	+7.8%
1910	614	+11.4%

Year	Pop.	±%
1921	617	+0.5%
1930	886	+43.6%
1950	866	−2.3%
1961	1,062	+22.6%
1970	985	−7.3%

Year	Pop.	±%
1980	1,182	+20.0%
1991	1,326	+12.2%
2001	1,471	+10.9%
2011	1,563	+6.3%
2021	2,307	+47.6%

Source: Censuses

== Transport ==
Včelná is located on the railway lines České Budějovice–Linz and Jindřichův Hradec–Horní Dvořiště.

== Sights ==
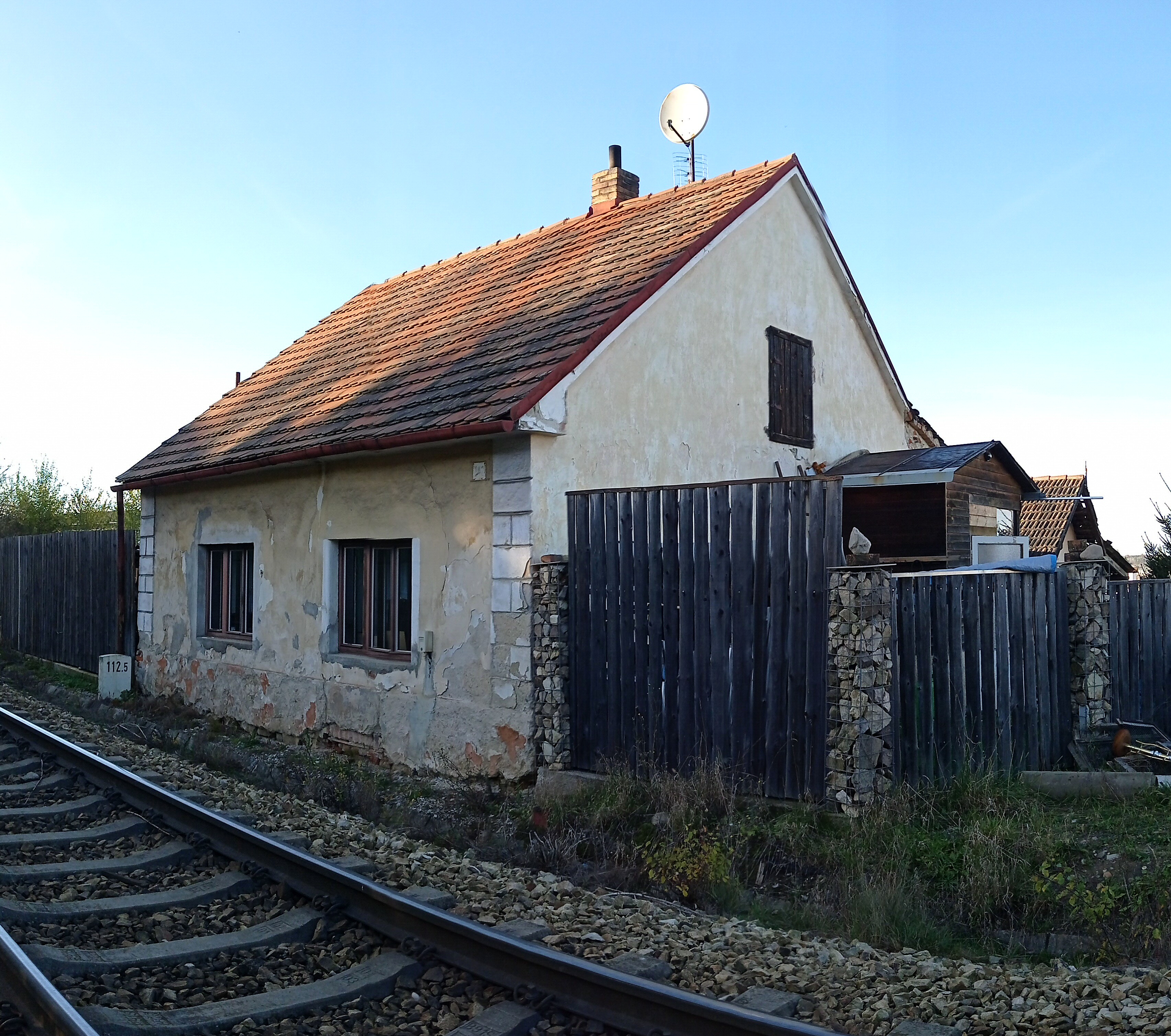
Former guardhouse

The only historical landmark in the municipality is a former guardhouse of the Budweis–Linz Horse-Drawn Railway, the second oldest continental railway. It was built in 1826–1832. Due to its historical value, it is protected as a national cultural monument (as part of the Budweis–Linz Horse-Drawn Railway).

== Notable people ==
- Zdeněk Tikal (1929–1991), Australian ice hockey player
- František Tikal (1933–2008), ice hockey player
