= Tical =

Tical may refer to:

- Tical (unit), an archaic unit of mass and currency in Southeast Asia.
- Derivative currencies of the unit:
  - Cambodian tical, the currency of Cambodia until 1875
  - Thai baht, formerly known to foreigners as the tical
- Tical (album), an album by Method Man

== See also ==
- Tikal (disambiguation)
