= Patrick Lalime =

Canadian ice hockey player

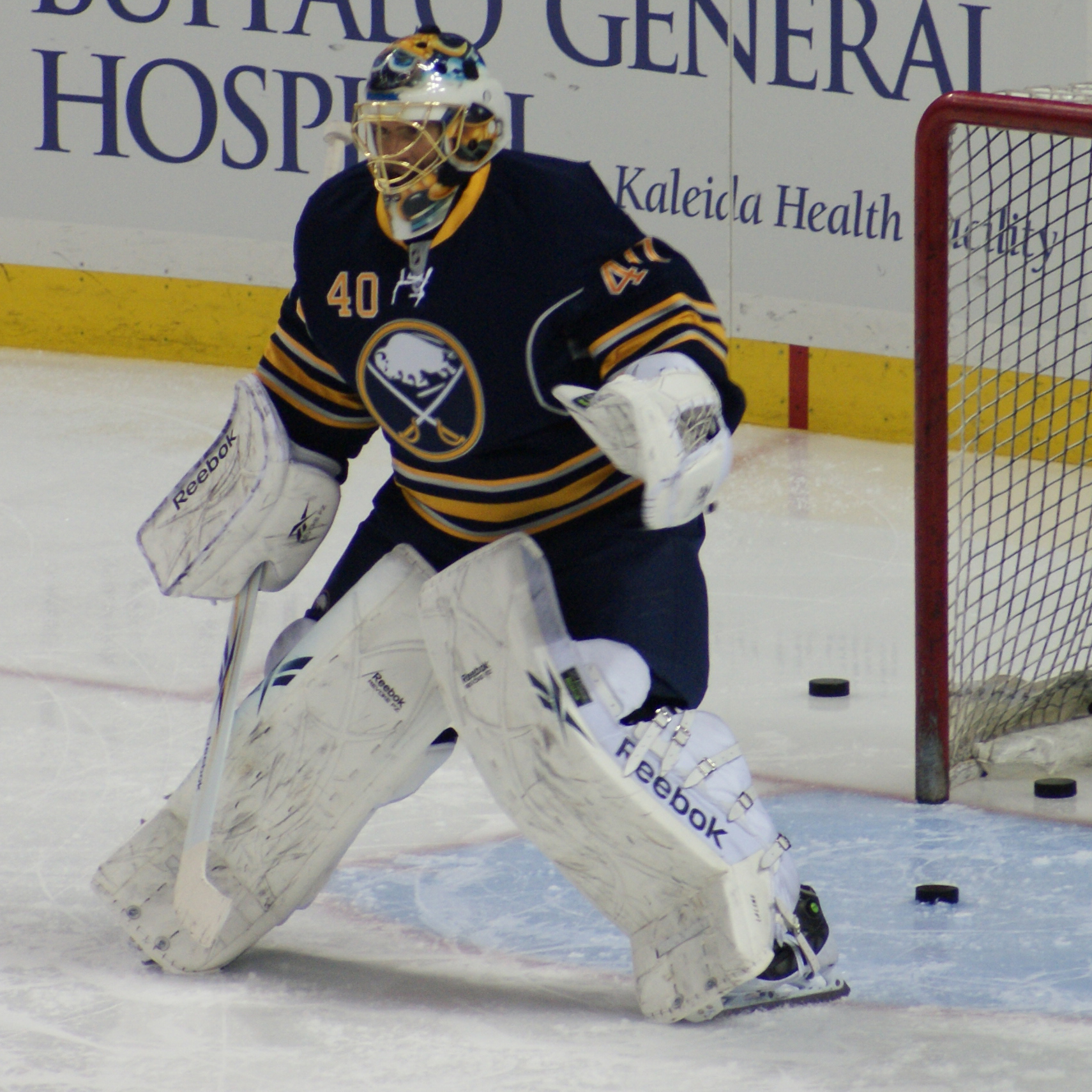
- Lalime with the Buffalo Sabres in 2010
- Born: July 7, 1974 (age 51) Saint-Bonaventure, Quebec, Canada
- Height: 6 ft 3 in (191 cm)
- Weight: 189 lb (86 kg; 13 st 7 lb)
- Position: Goaltender
- Caught: Left
- Played for: Pittsburgh Penguins; Ottawa Senators; St. Louis Blues; Chicago Blackhawks; Buffalo Sabres
- NHL draft: 156th overall, 1993; Pittsburgh Penguins
- Playing career: 1994–2011

Patrick Lalime (born July 7, 1974) is a Canadian ice hockey commentator and former professional ice hockey player who played twelve seasons in the National Hockey League (NHL) with the Pittsburgh Penguins, Ottawa Senators, St. Louis Blues, Chicago Blackhawks and Buffalo Sabres. Lalime retired from playing in 2011 to join the Réseau des sports (RDS) television network covering the Ottawa Senators, but has since left RDS to cover the Montreal Canadiens and the NHL for TVA Sports.

== Pre-NHL years ==
As a youth, Lalime played in the 1988 Quebec International Pee-Wee Hockey Tournament with the Drummondville Voltigeurs minor ice hockey team.

Lalime played his junior hockey with the Shawinigan Cataractes of the QMJHL. In 1992–93, Lalime posted a 10–24–4 record with a GAA of 4.67 and a .863 save percentage as the team failed to make the playoffs. In the 1993 NHL entry draft, Lalime was chosen by the Pittsburgh Penguins in the sixth round, the 156th overall pick. In 1993–94, he returned to the Cataractes and posted a 22–20–2 record with a GAA of 4.22. In the playoffs, Lalime struggled badly with a 1–3 record and GAA of 6.73.

In 1994–95, Lalime moved to the Hampton Roads Admirals of the ECHL where he posted a solid 15–7–3 record, a GAA of 3.35 and save percentage of .898 until January 1995. Then on January 26, Lalime signed a contract with the Penguins, who then assigned him to the Cleveland Lumberjacks of the IHL. He struggled with the Lumberjacks, with a 7–10–4 record and a 4.44 GAA and save percentage of .882.

In 1995–96, Lalime remained with the Lumberjacks, and helped lead the team to the playoffs with a 20–12–7 record, 3.86 GAA and save percentage of .893 in 41 games. He was recalled to the Penguins twice in December 1995 and served as a backup goalie for nine games, but never saw any action. He also served as a backup for the Penguins in the playoffs for four games and did not participate in Cleveland's playoff run.

== NHL years ==
=== Early success ===
Lalime went back to Cleveland for a third season in 1996–97 and remained with the Lumberjacks until early November. The Penguins then called him up and Lalime made his NHL debut on November 16 against the New York Rangers, as he replaced Ken Wregget midway through the game, allowing three goals on 14 shots in an 8–3 loss. Lalime's next appearance was on December 6, replacing Wregget after the first period down 2–0, but Lalime made 16 saves and the Penguins rebounded for a 5–3 win, giving him his first career victory. Lalime was given the start the next night against the Mighty Ducks of Anaheim, and he responded with 30 saves in a 5–3 victory. Lalime went on to set an NHL record with the longest unbeaten streak to begin a career (16 games with a 14–0–2 record) before suffering his first defeat on January 23, a 4–3 OT loss to the Colorado Avalanche. During the streak, Lalime recorded his first shutout, a 4–0 win over the San Jose Sharks on December 13, and had a 49 save performance against the Calgary Flames on January 21, a 4–2 Penguins victory. After the streak ended, Lalime cooled off for the rest of the season and finished off with a 21–12–2 record, 2.94 GAA and a save percentage of .913. With Cleveland, Lalime was 6–6–2 with a 3.24 GAA. He dressed as the backup to Wregget during the Penguins five playoff games that year. For his efforts, he was named to the NHL's All-Rookie Team.

In 1997–98, Lalime and the Penguins could not agree on a contract, and he spent the season with the Grand Rapids Griffins of the IHL, appearing in 31 games and posting a 10–10–9 record with a team leading GAA of 2.61 and .918 save percentage. On March 24, 1998, the Penguins traded his rights to the Mighty Ducks of Anaheim for Sean Pronger, but Lalime stayed with the Griffins, and played in one playoff game, allowing four goals in an overtime loss.

In 1998–99, he failed to make the Mighty Ducks team during the pre-season, and the club assigned him to the Kansas City Blades of the IHL. Lalime rewrote the team's record book with a 39–20–4 record, a 3.01 GAA and a save percentage of .900. He was named IHL goaltender of the month for March and earned a first team all-star selection after leading the league in wins, minutes played (3789) and saves (1708). In the playoffs, Lalime went 1–2 with a 2.08 GAA as Kansas City lost to the Long Beach Ice Dogs in the first round.

=== Senators ===
The Mighty Ducks traded Lalime to the Ottawa Senators for Ted Donato and Antti-Jussi Niemi on June 18, and he opened the 1999–2000 season as a Senator as he and Ron Tugnutt split duties. Lalime began his Senators career with a 3–0 shutout victory over the Philadelphia Flyers on October 2. He had a solid season with a 19–14–3 record, a GAA of 2.33 and save percentage of .905. The Senators traded Tugnutt to Pittsburgh in March for Tom Barrasso, and Lalime served as his backup for the remainder of the season. Lalime dressed for six playoff games against the Toronto Maple Leafs, but did not see any action as the Senators were put out in the first round.

The Senators gave Lalime the starting job in 2000–01, and he responded with a 36–19–5 record, 2.35 GAA, and a save percentage of .914 and helped the Senators to winning the Northeast Division, despite missing ten games with a sprained left MCL in mid-October. He was named NHL Player of the Week twice (November 27 – December 3 and February 12–18). In the playoffs, the Senators met the Maple Leafs for the second consecutive season, and Lalime played very well, with a GAA of 2.39, however the Senators struggled to score goals and were eliminated in four games.

In 2001–02 Lalime had a 27–24–8 record, 2.48 GAA and .903 save percentage. He was second in the league with seven shutouts and set a club record with a 149:41 shutout streak from October 23 to November 10. In the playoffs, the Senators faced off with the Philadelphia Flyers and were heavy underdogs, however, Lalime was unbeatable, as he allowed only two goals as Ottawa defeated the Flyers in five games. His GAA for the series was 0.40, and he had a .985 save percentage. In the second round, the Senators met up with the Maple Leafs for the third straight year, and with a 5–0 game one win, Lalime tied an NHL playoff record with four shutouts. However the Maple Leafs stormed back and eventually won the series in seven games. Lalime finished the 2002 playoffs with a 7–5 record and a 1.39 GAA.

In 2002–03, the Senators won the Presidents' Trophy for having the best regular season record, and Lalime led the way with a 39–20–7 record, 2.16 GAA and .911 save percentage. He was second in the NHL in wins, shutouts (8), fourth in minutes (3943) and fifth in GAA. He appeared in his first all-star game on February 2 after Ed Belfour pulled out with an injury. He made 18 saves on 19 shots in 25 minutes, then he allowed three goals during the shootout and took the loss. He broke his own record for shutout streak with 184:06 from January 9 to 18. In the playoffs, he helped the Senators defeat the New York Islanders in five games, then the Philadelphia Flyers in six games, before losing to the eventual Stanley Cup champion New Jersey Devils in seven games in the Eastern Conference Final. Lalime had an 11–7 record and GAA of 1.82 during the playoffs.

In 2003–04, Lalime finished with a 25–23–7 record with a 2.29 GAA and save percentage of .905. In the opening round of the playoffs, the Senators met their Battle of Ontario opponents, the Maple Leafs for the fourth time in five years. Lalime struggled during the series, allowing the opening goal in every game, and despite the Senators heavily outshooting the Maple Leafs, the series was tied after six games. In game seven, Lalime allowed two soft goals to Joe Nieuwendyk, and after the first period he was pulled out of the game with the Senators losing 3–0. They eventually lost 4–1 and lost to the Maple Leafs for the fourth time in the playoffs. It marked the end of Lalime's playing time in Ottawa.

=== Post-Ottawa years ===
After acquiring star goaltender Dominik Hašek via free agency, the Senators decided to trade Lalime to the St. Louis Blues for a fourth round conditional pick in the 2005 NHL entry draft on June 27, 2004. Lalime was set to be the Blues starter during the 2004–05 season, however the lockout wiped out the season, and Lalime did not play any hockey that year.

During the 2005–06 season, he earned his first win with the Blues on October 11 against the Chicago Blackhawks, making 32 saves in a 4–1 victory. However, this was a season to forget for Lalime, as he finished the year with a 4–18–8 record, 3.64 GAA and a .881 save percentage. He also spent a part of the season in the AHL, where he posted a record of 6–6–1, 2.86 GAA and .903 save percentage with the Peoria Rivermen. On April 2, Lalime played his final game as a Blue, as he suffered a torn ACL that had him out for the remainder of the season.

On July 1, 2006, Lalime was signed by the Chicago Blackhawks to a one-year, $700,000 contract, likely to be the backup to Nikolai Khabibulin. He ended up being injured just before training camp with a herniated disk. In his debut as a Blackhawk on February 7, 2007, Lalime stopped 34 shots and shut out the Vancouver Canucks as Chicago won the game 3–0. He went 4–6–1 in 12 games during the regular season with a 3.07 goals against average and a .896 save percentage. His play with the Blackhawks was good enough for the club to re-sign him to another one-year contract, this one worth $950,000.

On July 1, 2008, Lalime was signed by the Buffalo Sabres to a two-year, $2 million contract to play backup to Ryan Miller. In his first season with the Sabres, Lalime recorded a 5-13-3 record with a 3.10 goals against average.

On July 20, 2011, Lalime retired from the NHL and became an analyst on Ottawa Senators television broadcasts on RDS. Lalime worked 15 Senators games on the French-language network during the 2011-12 season as well as contributing to other hockey shows. He quit RDS in 2014 to become the primary NHL analyst for TVA Sports.

== Records ==
- On May 2, 2002, Lalime became the fourteenth goaltender in NHL history to record four shutouts in one postseason, with a 27-save, 5–0 victory, in Toronto over the Maple Leafs. The win gave Lalime's Senators a 1–0 lead in their Eastern Conference Semifinal series.
- Owns the Senators record for wins in a season (39 in 2002–03), along with career playoff wins (21).
- Longest unbeaten streak to start an NHL career: 16 games (14 wins, 2 ties)

== Awards ==
- Nominated for the Bill Masterton Memorial Trophy (2008)

== Mask creativity ==
Lalime is known for his distinguishing goalie mask theme - the use of cartoon eyes. His first mask in Pittsburgh featured a penguin with its eyes peeking through the ice. When he played for the Ottawa Senators, Lalime's mask featured the Warner Brothers cartoon character Marvin the Martian. The use of the character was inspired by the similarity of Marvin's costume to the Senators team logo. However, after a terrible St. Louis start (and getting sent to the minors), Lalime came back to the lineup with a completely different goalie mask which still featured the Marvin the Martian theme. This trend continued in Chicago, where Lalime had the same theme going with his Blackhawks helmet, though during that time, Marvin featured an Indian headdress. In 2010, Lalime signed a deal with the Buffalo Sabres and wore a mask featuring Marvin with the horns of a buffalo.

=== TV guest appearances ===
- RDS - May 2, 2007
- RDS - April 25, 2007
- TSN's Off The Record - April 19, 2007
- TSN's Off The Record - May 12, 2008
- TVA sports (Hockey analyst) - since January 2015

== Career statistics ==
=== Regular season and playoffs ===
			Regular season										Playoffs
Season	Team	League	GP	W	L	T	OTL	MIN	GA	SO	GAA	SV%	GP	W	L	MIN	GA	SO	GAA	SV%
1990–91	Abitibi-Témiscamingue Forestiers	QMAAA	26	9	17	0	—	1,595	151	0	5.81	—	—	—	—	—	—	—	—
1991–92	Valleyfield Braves	QJHL	—	—	—	—	—	—	—	—	—	—	—	—	—	—	—	—	—	—
1991–92	Shawinigan Cataractes	QMJHL	6	1	2	0	—	271	25	0	5.54	.797	—	—	—	—	—	—	—	—
1992–93	Shawinigan Cataractes	QMJHL	44	10	26	5	—	2,468	192	0	4.67	.866	—	—	—	—	—	—	—	—
1993–94	Shawinigan Cataractes	QMJHL	48	22	20	2	—	2,718	188	1	4.15	.876	5	1	3	224	25	0	6.69	.793
1994–95	Hampton Roads Admirals	ECHL	26	15	7	3	—	1,471	82	2	3.35	.894	—	—	—	—	—	—	—	—
1994–95	Cleveland Lumberjacks	IHL	23	7	10	4	—	1,230	91	0	4.44	.882	—	—	—	—	—	—	—	—
1995–96	Cleveland Lumberjacks	IHL	41	20	12	7	—	2,314	149	0	3.86	.893	—	—	—	—	—	—	—	—
1996–97	Pittsburgh Penguins	NHL	39	21	12	2	—	2,057	101	3	2.95	.913	—	—	—	—	—	—	—	—
1996–97	Cleveland Lumberjacks	IHL	14	6	6	2	—	834	45	1	3.24	.907	—	—	—	—	—	—	—	—
1997–98	Grand Rapids Griffins	IHL	31	10	10	9	—	1,749	76	2	2.61	.918	1	0	1	77	4	0	3.11	.892
1998–99	Kansas City Blades	IHL	66	39	20	4	—	3,789	190	2	3.02	.900	3	1	2	179	6	1	2.01	.942
1999–00	Ottawa Senators	NHL	38	19	14	3	—	2,038	79	3	2.33	.905	—	—	—	—	—	—	—	—
2000–01	Ottawa Senators	NHL	60	36	19	5	—	3,606	141	7	2.35	.914	4	0	4	250	10	0	2.39	.899
2001–02	Ottawa Senators	NHL	61	27	24	8	—	3,582	148	7	2.48	.903	12	7	5	777	18	4	1.39	.946
2002–03	Ottawa Senators	NHL	67	39	20	7	—	3,943	142	8	2.16	.911	18	11	7	1,122	34	1	1.82	.924
2003–04	Ottawa Senators	NHL	57	25	23	7	—	3,324	127	5	2.29	.905	7	3	4	398	13	0	1.96	.906
2005–06	St. Louis Blues	NHL	31	4	18	—	8	1,699	103	0	3.64	.881	—	—	—	—	—	—	—	—
2005–06	Peoria Rivermen	AHL	14	6	6	—	0	798	38	1	2.86	.903	—	—	—	—	—	—	—	—
2006–07	Norfolk Admirals	AHL	4	3	1	—	0	241	10	0	2.49	.930	—	—	—	—	—	—	—	—
2006–07	Chicago Blackhawks	NHL	12	4	6	—	1	644	33	1	3.07	.896	—	—	—	—	—	—	—	—
2007–08	Chicago Blackhawks	NHL	32	16	12	—	2	1,828	86	1	2.82	.897	—	—	—	—	—	—	—	—
2008–09	Buffalo Sabres	NHL	24	5	13	—	3	1,296	67	0	3.10	.900	—	—	—	—	—	—	—	—
2009–10	Buffalo Sabres	NHL	16	4	8	—	2	854	40	0	2.81	.907	—	—	—	—	—	—	—	—
2009–10	Portland Pirates	AHL	2	0	1	—	1	124	6	0	2.91	.914	—	—	—	—	—	—	—	—
2010–11	Buffalo Sabres	NHL	7	0	5	—	0	365	18	0	2.96	.890	—	—	—	—	—	—	—	—
NHL totals			444	200	174	32	16	25,241	1,085	35	2.58	.905	41	21	20	2,549	75	5	1.77	.926
