= Radek Bonk =

Czech ice hockey player (born 1976)

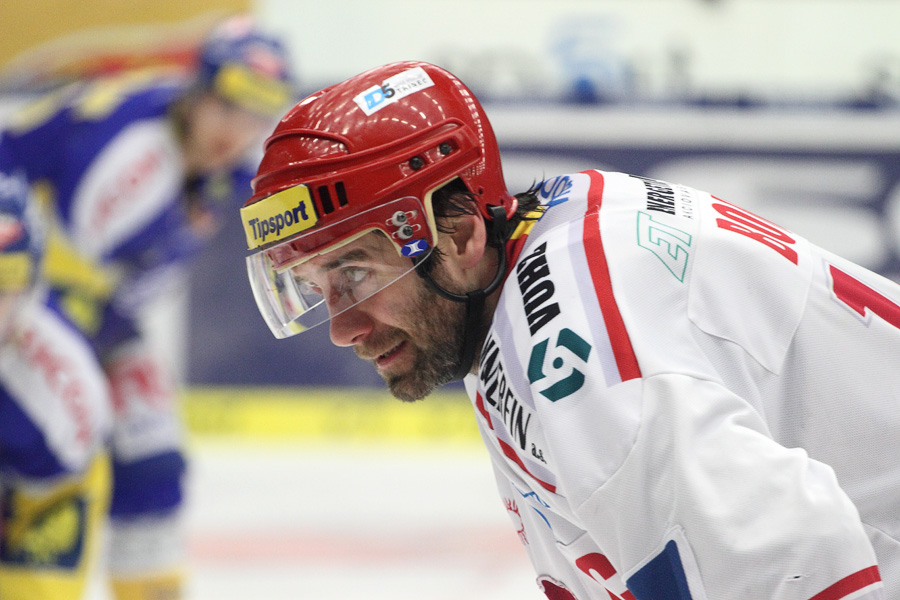
- Bonk with Oceláři Třinec in 2012
- Born: 9 January 1976 (age 50) Krnov, Czechoslovakia
- Height: 6 ft 3 in (191 cm)
- Weight: 213 lb (97 kg; 15 st 3 lb)
- Position: Centre
- Shot: Left
- Played for: Zlín ZPS; Ottawa Senators; HC IPB Pojišťovna Pardubice; Oceláři Třinec; Montreal Canadiens; Nashville Predators; Lokomotiv Yaroslavl
- National team: Czech Republic
- NHL draft: 3rd overall, 1994; Ottawa Senators
- Playing career: 1993–2014

Radek Bonk (born 9 January 1976) is a Czech former professional ice hockey player. Bonk was a first-round pick of the Ottawa Senators of the National Hockey League. He also played for Montreal Canadiens and Nashville Predators. He last played for Oceláři Třinec of the Czech Extraliga before retiring.

== Playing career ==
Bonk was born in Czechoslovakia and began his hockey career playing for Slezan Opava in the Junior Czech league and Zlín in the Czech Extraliga. He moved to North America in 1993 with a goal of playing in the National Hockey League (NHL) and was signed by the International Hockey League (IHL)'s Las Vegas Thunder, with whom he spent the 1993–94 season as a 17-year-old because he refused to play for the Owen Sound Platers of the OHL. Bonk was an immediate sensation in the IHL and by the end of his first season of the North American brand of hockey he had registered 42 goals and 45 assists for 87 points in 76 games. NHL scouts took notice, and Bonk found himself at or near the top of all the top prospects lists for the 1994 NHL entry draft. Given his young age (17), size, and ability to quickly adapt to the more physical style of hockey in North America, Bonk became a "can't miss" prospect.

Bonk was drafted third overall by the Ottawa Senators in the 1994 NHL entry draft, the first forward selected. He returned to Las Vegas for the first half of the 1994–95 season while the NHL was shut down by the owners' lockout and registered 20 points in 33 games. His debut NHL season of 1994–95 was somewhat disappointing, and Bonk scored only 3 goals and 11 points in 42 games. His progress took some seasoning in his first five years of NHL hockey before he emerged as one of the league's most complete forwards by 1999–2000. He went on to play for the Senators for 10 seasons, eventually becoming the team's number one centre under the leadership of head coach Jacques Martin.

Bonk originally wore number 76 as a member of the Thunder and in his first two seasons in Ottawa, but switched to number 14 after new general manager Pierre Gauthier implemented a team rule prohibiting players from wearing "vanity numbers" (that is, numbers higher than the goaltenders). Thus, teammate Alexandre Daigle also switched to number 9 from his traditional 91.

A skilled player, Bonk was often criticized in the Ottawa media for his lack of aggression, despite his size. On the day of the 2004 NHL entry draft, he was traded to the Los Angeles Kings for a third-round draft pick. The same day, he was traded to the Montreal Canadiens along with Cristobal Huet for Mathieu Garon and a third round selection in the 2004 draft. His most productive season points-wise was the 2001–02 NHL season when he produced 70 points for the Ottawa Senators.

On 2 July 2007, Bonk signed as a free agent with the Nashville Predators to a two-year contract.

On 22 July 2009, after 969 games in the NHL it was announced that Bonk agreed to a one-year contract with Lokomotiv Yaroslavl to continue his career in the Russian Kontinental Hockey League (KHL). After only seven games into the 2009–10 season, the majority of his teammates perished in the 2011 Lokomotiv Yaroslavl plane crash, Bonk left Yaroslavl to return to the Czech Republic with Oceláři Třinec in the Czech Extraliga on 8 October 2009. Radek posted 17 points in 39 games for the season with Oceláři to earn a two-year contract extension on 2 May 2010.

Bonk announced his retirement on 19 May 2014.

== Personal life ==
Bonk is married to a Canadian, Jill Sarcen, whom he met in Ottawa while a member of the Senators. They have sons — Oliver and Cameron, and daughters Kennedy and Maya. He relocated with his family to Ottawa in 2015, where he plays in a recreational men's hockey league and coaches a youth hockey team on which one of his daughters plays. His son Oliver, was drafted in the first round, 22nd overall, by the Philadelphia Flyers in the 2023 NHL entry draft.

Bonk is an uncle of Patrik Bartošák, who was drafted 146th overall by the Los Angeles Kings in the 2013 NHL entry draft.

== Awards ==
- Gary F. Longman Memorial Trophy – 1993–94
- NHL All-Star Game – 2000, 2001

== Career statistics ==
=== Regular season and playoffs ===
| | | | Regular season | | | | | Playoffs |
| Season | Team | League | GP | G | A | Pts | PIM | GP | G | A | Pts | PIM |
|---|---|---|---|---|---|---|---|---|---|---|---|---|
| 1990–91 | HC Slezan Opava | TCH Jr | 35 | 47 | 42 | 89 | 25 | — | — | — | — | — |
| 1991–92 | AC ZPS Zlín | TCH Jr | 45 | 47 | 36 | 83 | 30 | — | — | — | — | — |
| 1992–93 | AC ZPS Zlín | TCH | 23 | 4 | 3 | 7 | 10 | 6 | 1 | 1 | 2 | — |
| 1993–94 | Las Vegas Thunder | IHL | 76 | 42 | 45 | 87 | 208 | 5 | 1 | 2 | 3 | 10 |
| 1994–95 | Las Vegas Thunder | IHL | 33 | 7 | 13 | 20 | 62 | — | — | — | — | — |
| 1994–95 | Ottawa Senators | NHL | 42 | 3 | 8 | 11 | 28 | — | — | — | — | — |
| 1994–95 | Prince Edward Island Senators | AHL | — | — | — | — | — | 1 | 0 | 0 | 0 | 0 |
| 1995–96 | Ottawa Senators | NHL | 76 | 16 | 19 | 35 | 36 | — | — | — | — | — |
| 1996–97 | Ottawa Senators | NHL | 53 | 5 | 13 | 18 | 14 | 7 | 0 | 1 | 1 | 4 |
| 1997–98 | Ottawa Senators | NHL | 65 | 7 | 9 | 16 | 16 | 5 | 0 | 0 | 0 | 2 |
| 1998–99 | Ottawa Senators | NHL | 81 | 16 | 16 | 32 | 48 | 4 | 0 | 0 | 0 | 6 |
| 1999–2000 | HC IPB Pojišťovna Pardubice | ELH | 3 | 1 | 0 | 1 | 4 | — | — | — | — | — |
| 1999–2000 | Ottawa Senators | NHL | 80 | 23 | 37 | 60 | 53 | 6 | 0 | 0 | 0 | 8 |
| 2000–01 | Ottawa Senators | NHL | 74 | 23 | 36 | 59 | 52 | 2 | 0 | 0 | 0 | 2 |
| 2001–02 | Ottawa Senators | NHL | 82 | 25 | 45 | 70 | 52 | 12 | 3 | 7 | 10 | 6 |
| 2002–03 | Ottawa Senators | NHL | 70 | 22 | 32 | 54 | 36 | 18 | 6 | 5 | 11 | 10 |
| 2003–04 | Ottawa Senators | NHL | 66 | 12 | 32 | 44 | 66 | 7 | 0 | 2 | 2 | 0 |
| 2004–05 | HC Oceláři Třinec | ELH | 27 | 6 | 10 | 16 | 44 | — | — | — | — | — |
| 2004–05 | HC Hamé Zlín | ELH | 6 | 3 | 2 | 5 | 4 | 6 | 0 | 2 | 2 | 8 |
| 2005–06 | Montreal Canadiens | NHL | 61 | 6 | 15 | 21 | 52 | 6 | 2 | 0 | 2 | 2 |
| 2006–07 | Montreal Canadiens | NHL | 74 | 13 | 10 | 23 | 54 | — | — | — | — | — |
| 2007–08 | Nashville Predators | NHL | 79 | 14 | 15 | 29 | 40 | 6 | 1 | 0 | 1 | 2 |
| 2008–09 | Nashville Predators | NHL | 66 | 9 | 16 | 25 | 34 | — | — | — | — | — |
| 2009–10 | Lokomotiv Yaroslavl | KHL | 7 | 0 | 2 | 2 | 6 | — | — | — | — | — |
| 2009–10 | HC Oceláři Třinec | ELH | 39 | 5 | 12 | 17 | 60 | 5 | 2 | 3 | 5 | 4 |
| 2010–11 | HC Oceláři Třinec | ELH | 50 | 14 | 25 | 39 | 68 | 18 | 6 | 7 | 13 | 24 |
| 2011–12 | HC Oceláři Třinec | ELH | 48 | 11 | 14 | 25 | 44 | 5 | 0 | 1 | 1 | 0 |
| 2012–13 | HC Oceláři Třinec | ELH | 39 | 14 | 26 | 40 | 30 | 13 | 4 | 6 | 10 | 10 |
| 2013–14 | HC Oceláři Třinec | ELH | 49 | 8 | 23 | 31 | 30 | 11 | 4 | 8 | 12 | 6 |
| | NHL totals | | 969 | 194 | 303 | 497 | 581 | 73 | 12 | 15 | 27 | 42 |
| | ELH totals | | 261 | 62 | 112 | 174 | 284 | 58 | 16 | 27 | 43 | 52 |

=== International ===
Medal record

Men's ice hockey

Representing the Czech Republic

World Championships
| Gold medal – first place | 1996 Vienna | |

Representing Czechoslovakia

World Junior Championships
| Bronze medal – third place | 1993 Gävle | |

| Year | Team | Event | GP | G | A | Pts | PIM |
|---|---|---|---|---|---|---|---|
| 1993 | Czechoslovakia | EJC | 6 | 4 | 2 | 6 | 6 |
| 1996 | Czech Republic | WC | 8 | 2 | 2 | 4 | 14 |
| 1996 | Czech Republic | WCH | 3 | 1 | 0 | 1 | 0 |
| Senior totals | | | 11 | 3 | 2 | 5 | 14 |

| Preceded by Alexandre Daigle | Ottawa Senators first-round draft pick 1994 | Succeeded by Bryan Berard |
