= Zdeněk Tikal =

Australian ice hockey player

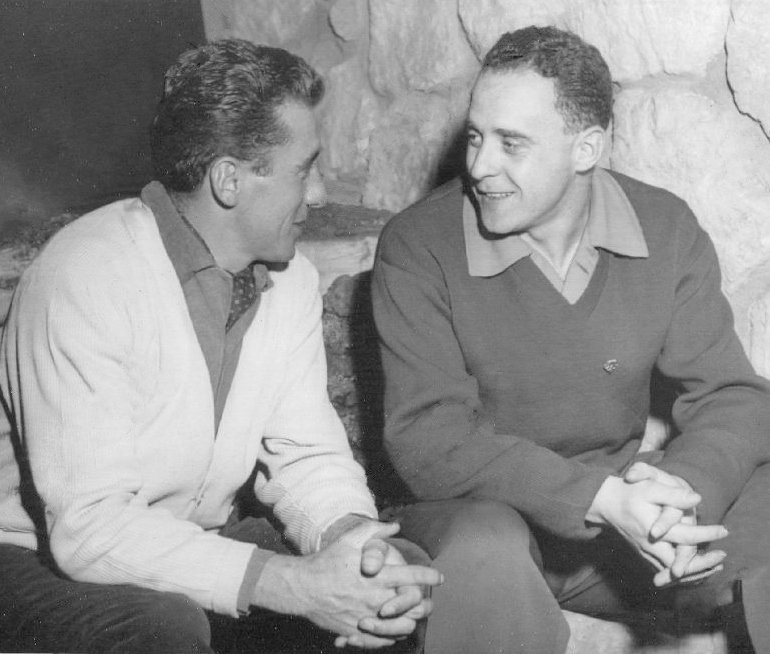
- Zdeněk (left) and František at the 1960 Olympics

Personal information
- Born: 15 June 1929 Včelná, Czechoslovakia
- Died: 20 November 1991 (aged 62) Melbourne, Australia

Sport
- Sport: Ice hockey
- Club: Hakoah Ice Hockey Club

Zdeněk "Steve" Tikal (15 June 1929 – 20 November 1991) was an Australian ice hockey player. Born in Czechoslovakia, he fled to Australia with his father in 1948. At the 1960 Winter Olympics he was severely injured in his first match against Czechoslovaks, who considered him a traitor, and had to sit out the rest of the tournament. His brother František played against him at those Olympics.
