= František Tikal =

Czech ice hockey coach, ice hockey player and field hockey player

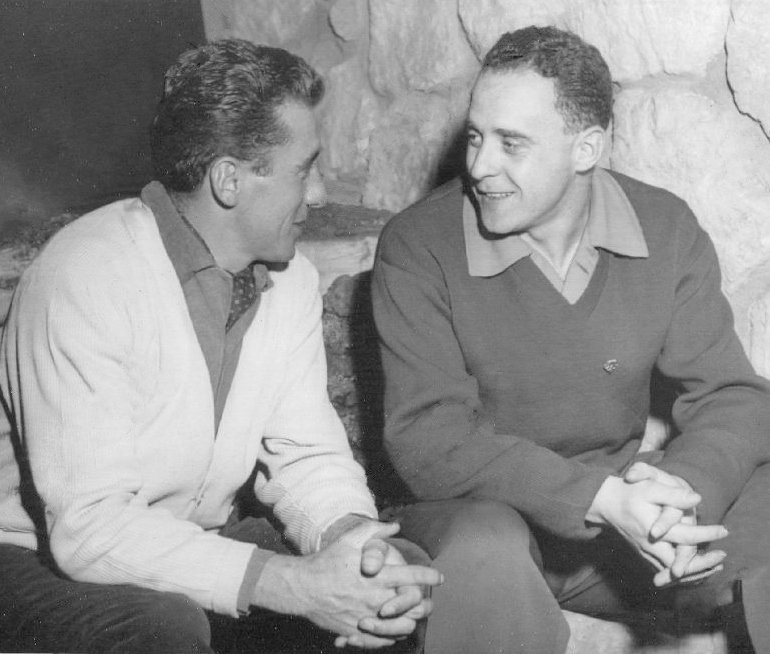
- Zdeněk and František (right) at the 1960 Olympics

Personal information
- Born: 18 July 1933 Včelná, Czechoslovakia
- Died: 10 August 2008 (aged 75) Prague, Czech Republic
- Height: 180 cm (5 ft 11 in)
- Weight: 82 kg (181 lb)

Sport
- Sport: Ice hockey
- Club: HC Sparta Praha
Medal record
Representing Czechoslovakia
Olympic Games
Bronze medal – third place	1964 Innsbruck	Team
World Championships
Bronze medal – third place	1957 Moscow	Team
Bronze medal – third place	1959 Prague	Team
Bronze medal – third place	1963 Stockholm	Team
Silver medal – second place	1965 Tampere	Team
Silver medal – second place	1966 Ljubljana	Team

František Tikal (18 July 1933 – 10 August 2008) was a Czechoslovak ice hockey defenseman. He played 17 seasons in the Czechoslovak Extraliga for HC Sparta Praha and won two national titles. Internationally he played 59 games for Czechoslovakia, including 15 at the 1960 and 1964 Winter Olympics, and earned an Olympic bronze medal in 1964, placing fourth in 1960. He was named the best defender of the tournament at the 1964 Olympics and 1965 World Championships. At the 1960 Games he played one game against his brother Zdeněk, who fled to Australia in 1948. In 2004, Tikal was inducted into the IIHF Hall of Fame.
