= SK Ull =

Norwegian Nordic skiing club

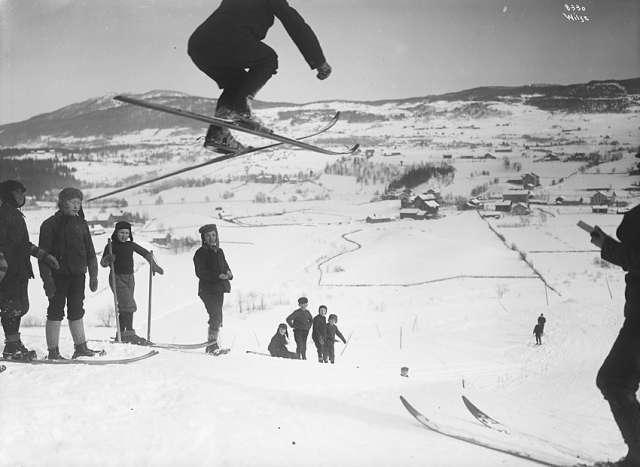
Skiers from Ull in 1908.

Skiklubben Ull was a Norwegian Nordic skiing club based in Oslo. Founded in 1883, Skiklubben Ull attracted several skilled sportsmen who between 1883 and 1891 won six Ladies' Cups and one King's Cup in national skiing events. The sporting facilities belonging the club were located in Vestre Aker, with the ski jumping hill Ullbakken near Frognerseteren being opened in 1884. The prestigious Husebyrennet was staged there once. Members of SK Ull were later instrumental in moving this prestigious contest to the hill Holmenkollbakken.

Club members also held important positions in the general administration of skiing in Norway. The first Ull chairman Johan Bechholm was also the first secretary of the Association for the Promotion of Skiing; Karl Roll became the first chairman of the Norwegian Ski Federation, Hjalmar Krag became chairman in the Confederation of Sports and Fritz R. Huitfeldt was a pioneer in several respects.

The club was founded by students and its membership later drew from the upper social strata. During the first ten years of club history, forty-four of the sixty members admitted into the club belonged to one of four prestigious professions; physician, military officer, jurist or engineer. The club was furthermore exclusive, in that it only had 119 members during its first 100 years of existence. In 1893 the club raised its own cabin, thus grouping it together with other so-called "cabin ski clubs" such as Christiania SK. SK Ull eventually evolved from a skiing club to a social club in a skiing setting, using the old cabin for member meetings, which were also visited by the King of Norway.

== The most active sporting period, 1883–1898 ==
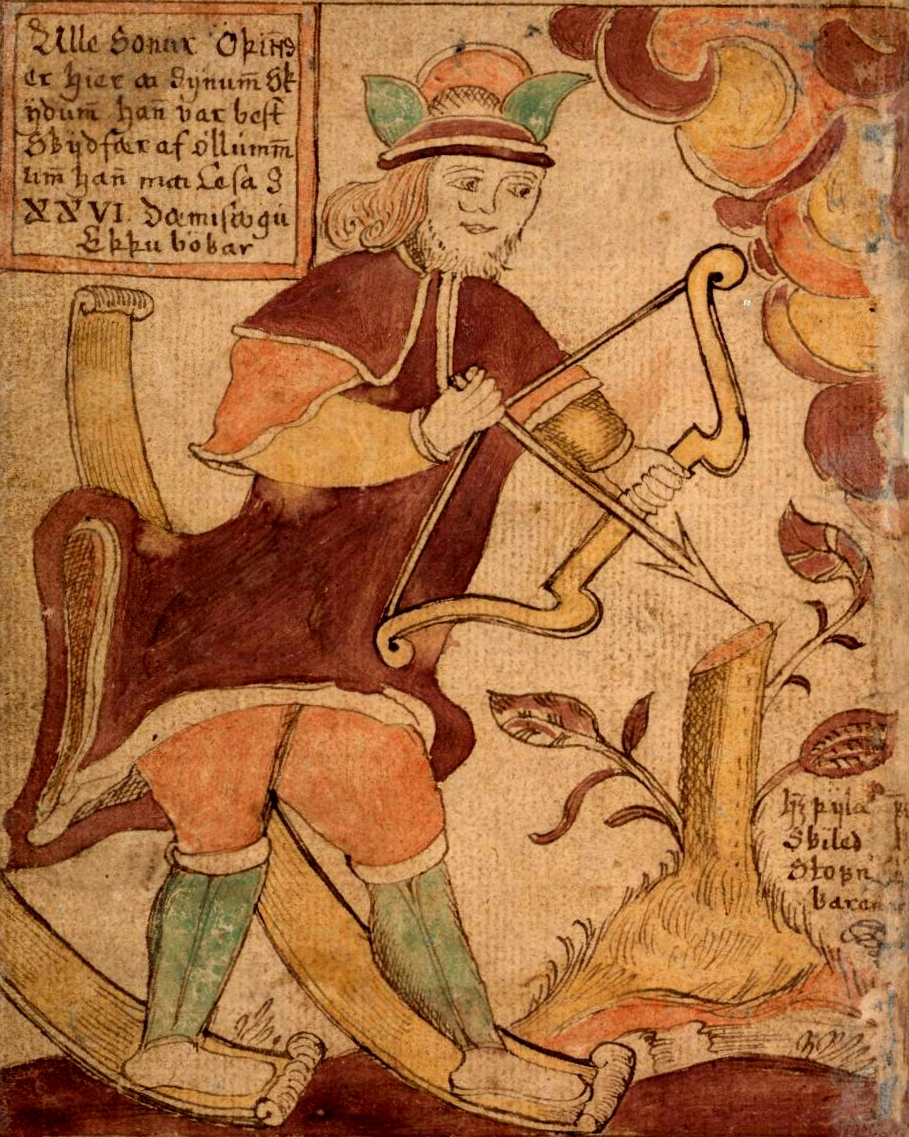
Ullr with his skis and bow.

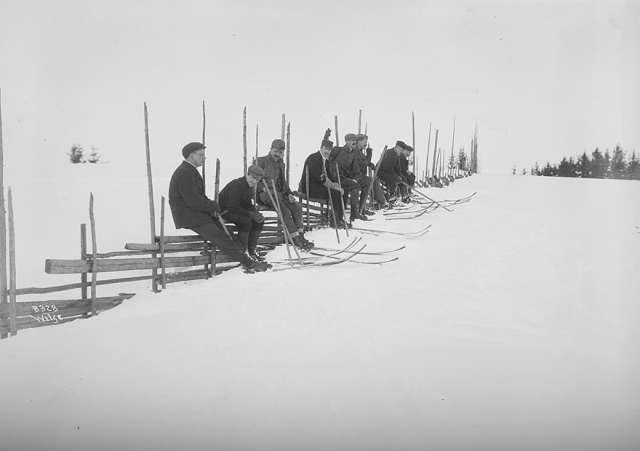
Skiers from Ull in 1908.

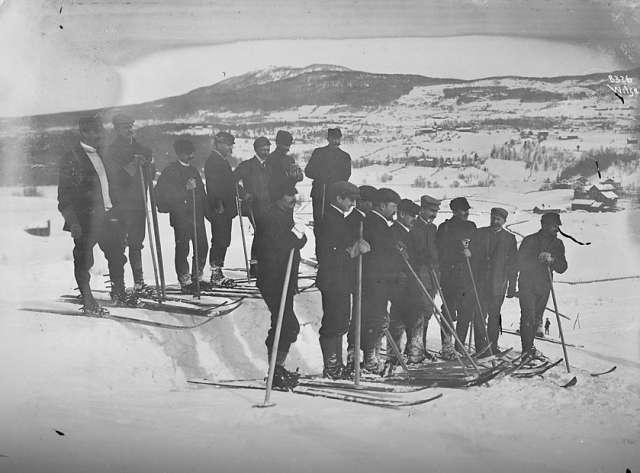
Skiers from Ull in 1908.

Skiklubben Ull was founded on 29 January 1883, and named after the Norse deity Ullr. In Norse mythology, Ullr was a god for hunting and competition, superior with his skis and his bow. SK Ull has been credited as being the second-oldest skiing club in the world, after Christiania SK. The club founders were a group of university students who socialized in apartments in Wessels gate. The young men usually conversed about their studies or played card games, but they were also hobby cross-country skiers, and decided to take up skiing in a more organized form by starting a club. The term describing a club member was ullaner.

The founding members were Thoralf Fabritius, Paul Lorck, Petter Dahl Thams, Andreas Bechholm, Johan Bechholm, Otto Dahl, Sigurd Gotaas and Michael Strøm Lie. New members were allowed every year until 1887, after which new members were usually admitted biannually, in 1889, 1891, 1893, 1895, 1896 and 1897. Notable members who joined the club shortly after the foundation include Fritz R. Huitfeldt, Henrik Florentz, Hans Grüner, Marius Grüner and Stefan Meidell. The first chairman was Johan Bechholm, followed by Sigurd Gotaas from 1885 and Fritz R. Huitfeldt from 1887 to 1891. The three honorary memberships proclaimed in the early period were Fritz R. Huitfeldt (1883), Hans Grüner (1884) and Axel Huitfeldt (1889).

The club saw sporting success on the national level (international competitions were few or none) in its first years. Johan Bechholm finished eleventh and won the Ladies' Cup in Husebyrennet of 1883. In 1884 Ingvald M. Smith-Kielland, Sr. won the Ladies' Cup and Richard Blichfeldt won the King's Cup. Vilhelm Nicolaysen finished fourth and won the Ladies' Cup in 1886, Karl Roll won the Ladies' Cup in 1889, Vilhelm Heiberg in 1890 and Otto Orre in 1891.

Ull maintained its own ski jumping hill, Ullbakken, near Frognerseteren in Vestre Aker. It was opened in 1884 with a festive ski jumping contest, attended by Prince Eugen of Norway and Sweden. Ullbakken was the site of Husebyrennet in 1890, when Kastellbakken was unusable. The dinner after this race was attended by Crown Prince Gustaf of Norway and Sweden. Karl Roll had an especially close relationship with the Swedish royal family, being a ski tutor for the princes while stationed in Stockholm between 1898 and 1904. After Norway abolished the personal union in 1905 and elected its own king, Roll immediately became an aide-de-camp for the new monarch.

The club also staged the members-only contest Ullrennet. In the invitation for Ullrennet and the subsequent banquet in 1897, the members were asked to take their place at the table "according to rank, estate, age, dignity and skiing profess". SK Ull also became the second in Norway to raise its own skiing cabin, "Ydale" at Voksenkollen in 1893. This was named after Ýdalir, the mythological dwelling of the deity Ullr. Some of Ull's rival clubs were Christiania SK, Skuld, Fram and Ondur. Christiania, Skuld and Fram owned skiing cabins similar to that of Ull—they were collectively referred to as "cabin skiing clubs".

Reportedly, it was SK Ull's forays into the district around Holmenkollen for sporting purposes that spurred the establishment of the new hill Holmenkollbakken in 1891. The knowledge of the area spurred Fritz R. Huitfeldt to pinpoint the location of the new hill, together with Hans Krag. This hill lay at a higher altitude than Kastellbakken, and thus had more favourable snow conditions. Holmenkollbakken quickly replaced Kastellbakken as the main hill in the district, and eventually became world-famous.

SK Ull also saw some sporting success in the 1890s, although the last Ladies' Cup was taken in 1891. The club was joined by top skiers like Tobias Bernhoft and Jørgen Berg. In the late 1890s, however, as many members reached higher ages, SK Ull became more of a gentlemen's social club than an active skiing club. This social club was exclusive by nature, with a clause in the by-laws that the membership could not surpass forty. Actually the club never had more than thirty members, which was the case in 1890, and rarely more than twenty. The members were drawn from the higher social strata of Norway's capital region. Forty-four of the sixty members admitted into the club up to the opening of Ydale belonged to one of four prestigious professions: physician, military officer, jurist or engineer.

== 1900–1945 ==
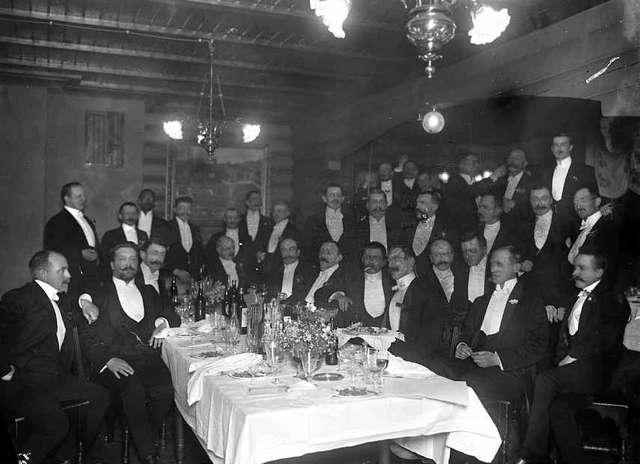
The celebration of Ull's 25th anniversary in 1908.

After 1898, there was a pause in admitting new members. Four were admitted between 1906 and 1908, followed by only one in the 1915, three in 1924, and two in 1935. In 1940 the average member age was 69.

After finishing their active careers, some of Ull's members entered the ranks of sports officials and administrators. Most notable was Karl Roll, who became the first chairman of the Norwegian Ski Federation in 1908. Several members had already held positions in the older organization Association for the Promotion of Skiing, founded three weeks before Ull, in 1883. Johan Bechholm was its first secretary, from 1883 to 1886, and many others followed. Johan Sverre (member since 1896) was a notable Olympic administrator after the Norwegian independence in 1905, and Hjalmar Krag (member since 1887) became chairman in the Confederation of Sports. Fritz R. Huitfeldt also became a known figure in his field; for his ski bindings, and for pioneering Telemark skiing. Huitfeldt's ski factory, which he started together with Richard Blichfeldt, was named Ull.

During the first years of the occupation of Norway by Nazi Germany, Ull continued to host private parties. Later, however, the club's cabin Ydale was occupied by the Germans from December 1942 to March 1945. Ull instead used the Grand Hotel for its sixtieth anniversary in 1943 and the annual convention of 1944. Two new members were admitted during the war; Sverre Martens and Einar Poulsson.

== After 1945 ==
At the war's end in 1945, Ull only had fourteen members. Its average member age was lowered to 65 years after the admission of five new members in 1946 and 1947. The post-war period also saw the admission to SK Ull of men from more professional groups. One of the new members, Erik Plahte, would serve as chairman from 1951 to 1973, when he backed down at the age of 84. Another of the new post-war members, Jakob Vaage, took over. He was then aged 68. By 1953, all the club's elected positions were held by post-war members. Three of the older members, some with experience dating to the 1880s, were admitted as honorary members, the first honorary members in SK Ull since 1889.

After professor Johs. Andenæs was admitted as a member in 1949, the club admitted thirteen members in the 1950s; seven in the 1960s as well as a corresponding member, Norwegian-Canadian Herman Smith-Johannsen; and only three in the 1970s. One member was elected i 1980, and three in 1983; Arvid Fossum, Odd Harsheim and Birger Ruud. Three honorary members were proclaimed after 1960: Erik Plahte in 1969, Herman Smith-Johanssen in 1975 and Jakob Vaage in 1983.

The cabin Ydale was still used for festivities, and became a small "museum" with skiing antiquities left behind by former members. The cabin was also used during the 1952 Winter Olympics as the residence of the Danish skiing team. A road leading to the cabin was named Ullveien in 1964. In 1983 the 100-year anniversary of Ull was hosted at Ydale with attendance from King Olav V of Norway.

== List of position-holders ==
This is a list of chairmen, deputy chairmen and managers/secretaries of SK Ull.

=== Chairmen ===
- 1883–1885: Johan Bechholm
- 1885–1887: Sigurd Gotaas
- 1887–1891: Fritz R. Huitfeldt
- 1891–1905: Emil Roll
- 1905–1910: Karl Roll
- 1910–1912: Andreas Brandrud
- 1912–1913: Jørgen Tandberg
- 1913–1917: Vilhelm Heiberg
- 1917–1928: Alf Scott-Hansen, Sr.
- 1928–1933: Johan Fredrik Gram
- 1933–1935: Emil Roll
- 1935–1940: Johan Fredrik Gram
- 1940–1949: Andreas Brandrud
- 1949–1951: Harald Kjerschow
- 1951–1973: Erik Plahte
- 1973–1992: Jakob Vaage
- 1992–1994: Odd Harsheim

[...]

- 2004–2011: Odd Seim-Haugen

[...]

- 2025: Sverre K. Seeberg

=== Vice chairmen ===
- 1883–1885 : Sigurd Gotaas
- 1885–1890 : Johan Bechholm
- 1890–1891 : Enevold Munch Falsen
- 1891–1893 : Sigval Jacobsen
- 1893–1894 : Jørgen Tandberg
- 1894–1905 : Vilhelm Heiberg
- 1905–1910 : Andreas Brandrud
- 1910–1912 : Jørgen Tandberg
- 1912–1916 : Alf Scott Hansen
- 1916–1917 : Jørgen Tandberg
- 1917–1926 : Tobias Bernhoft
- 1926–1928 : Johan Fredrik Gram
- 1928–1933 : Jørgen Berg
- 1933–1940 : Andreas Brandrud
- 1940–1944 : Nicolai Martens
- 1944–1949 : Harald Kjerschow
- 1949–1970 : Helge Dahl
- 1970–1973 : Jakob Vaage
- 1973–???? : Annar Poulsson

[...]

=== Managers and secretaries ===
The position as manager existed from 1883, but in 1952 it was split into two; secretary and treasurer.

- 1883–1887 : Henrik Florentz
- 1887–1890 : Marius Grüner
- 1890–1892 : Sven Poppe
- 1892–1893 : Mathias Rye
- 1893–1894 : Otto Orre
- 1894–1897 : Herman Løvenskiold
- 1897–1900 : Wilhelm Myhre
- 1900–1902 : Jørgen Barth
- 1902–1903 : Marcus Meisterlin
- 1903–1906 : August Koren
- 1906–1908 : Olaf Rye
- 1908–1911 : Adolf Denis Horn
- 1911–1919 : Marcus Meisterlin
- 1919–1935 : Ulrik F. L. Lyng
- 1935–1936 : Harald Kjerschow
- 1936–1949 : Otto P. Børresen
- 1949–1951 : Erik Plahte
- 1951–1963 : Jakob Vaage (secretary from 1952)
- 1963–1975 : Aage Træffen
- 1975–???? : Arild Smith-Kielland

[...]
