= Leangen Travbane =

Harness racing course in Trondheim, Norway

Coordinates: 63°25′50″N 10°28′07″E

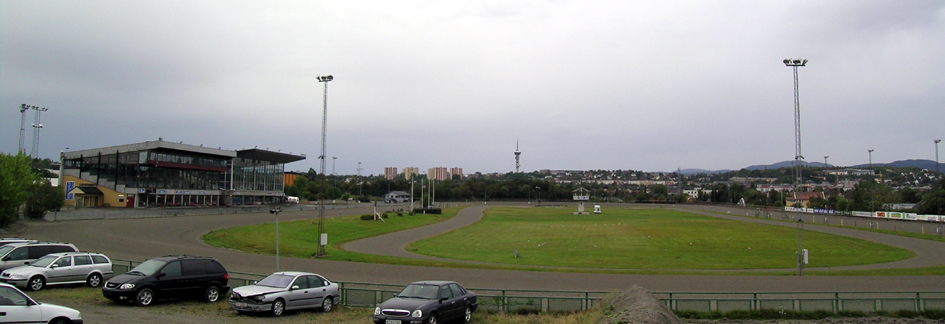
- Location: Leangen, Trondheim Municipality, Norway
- Owned by: Norwegian Trotting Association
- Date opened: 5 September 1931
- Course type: Harness racing

Leangen Travbane is a harness racing course located at Leangen in Trondheim Municipality, Norway. The race course is owned by the Norwegian Trotting Association and its parimutuel betting is handled by Norsk Rikstoto. Through this arrangement it is the only equine tote betting establishment in Trøndelag and Møre og Romsdal counties.

== History ==
Orkdal Tråvklubb was established as the first horse racing club in Norway in 1873, and the first club in Trondheim, Selskabet for kapkjøring i det nordenfjeldske Norge, was established in 1879, with Johan Henrik Spørck as the most enthusiastic founder. He took initiative for the first organized race to be held on the ice of Jonsvatnet that winter, and paid 200 Norwegian krone (NOK) in prize money from his own pocket. Summer races were organized along the closed off section of the Trondhjem–Støren Line, which had been closed between Sluppen and Valset. The organization worked with the breeding of fast trotting horses, and based itself on the Dølahest.

Interest declined from 1895, but rose again from 1904, when Trøndelag Trotting Association (TT) was established, as part of the Norwegian Trotting Association. Its initial race on Jonsvatnet gathered a crowd of 4,000 spectators. Later Vintervannet in Bymarka and Lodgårdsvannet in Melhus Municipality were used. However, dependency on cold weather for the execution of races and poor tracks on the ice caused interest in establishing a land track and the association started working with the issue in 1911.

TT moved its races to Lianvatnet from 1925, where it drew up to 6,000 spectators at its events. The association was offered a free lot at Lianmyrene in 1927, but declined. Up until the 1920s equine betting was illegal in Norway and the events and prize money was collected through admission rather than through bets. In 1928 Bjerke Travbane opened in Oslo and the law was changed, allowing for bets to be placed at races there. TT received permission to operate its first six toto races in 1930 and warmbloods competed for the first time.

A committee was established to look into the permanent track case. They eventually concluded that Leangen Søndre would be the most suitable site and planned to purchase 20 hectares (49 acres) of farmland and 6 hectares (15 acres) of forest to build the venue. Plans for the track were devised by engineer Sverre S. Klingenberg and after negotiations a price of NOK 77,500 was agreed upon for the lot. The site at the time a rural location in Strinda Municipality. Selmer and Blekkan bid for the construction, which was approved by TT's annual meeting on 30 April 1931. During the municipal council's discussion there was a proposal that the contractor would be required to only hire unemployed people from Strinda, but the terms were not approved with five against four council votes.

Construction commenced in May and the venue could open on 5 September, one week after schedule. During the German occupation of Norway Leangen was expropriated by the Wehrmacht and horse racing instead took place at Tempebanen. The popularity of horse-racing saw a dramatic increase during the war, in part because other sports were in a self-imposed shut-down and in part because of the lack of amenities for the general public to spend money on. The venue reopened after the war on 6 October 1946. During the 1950s the inner parts of the track were used as a recreational association football field.

Races at Leangen became part of Norsk Rikstoto tote betting from 1984, allowing for a national betting audience. From the 1990s this was further reorganized with a national network of commissioners. With the new system, all betting on horses in Trøndelag and Møre og Romsdal went to TT and Leangen. In 2008 the region had a revenue of NOK 333 million on betting.

== Facilities ==
The track is 1,000 meters (3,300 ft) long. Compared to the other racecourses in Norway, it has the steepest curves, with a radius of 65 meters (213 ft), and the longest straight before the finish, at 240 meters (790 ft). The venue has stables for 102 permanent and 43 visiting horses. There are various training tracks in the inner section. The venue has floodlights.
