= Karl Roll =

Norwegian sports official, skier and military officer (1868-1958)

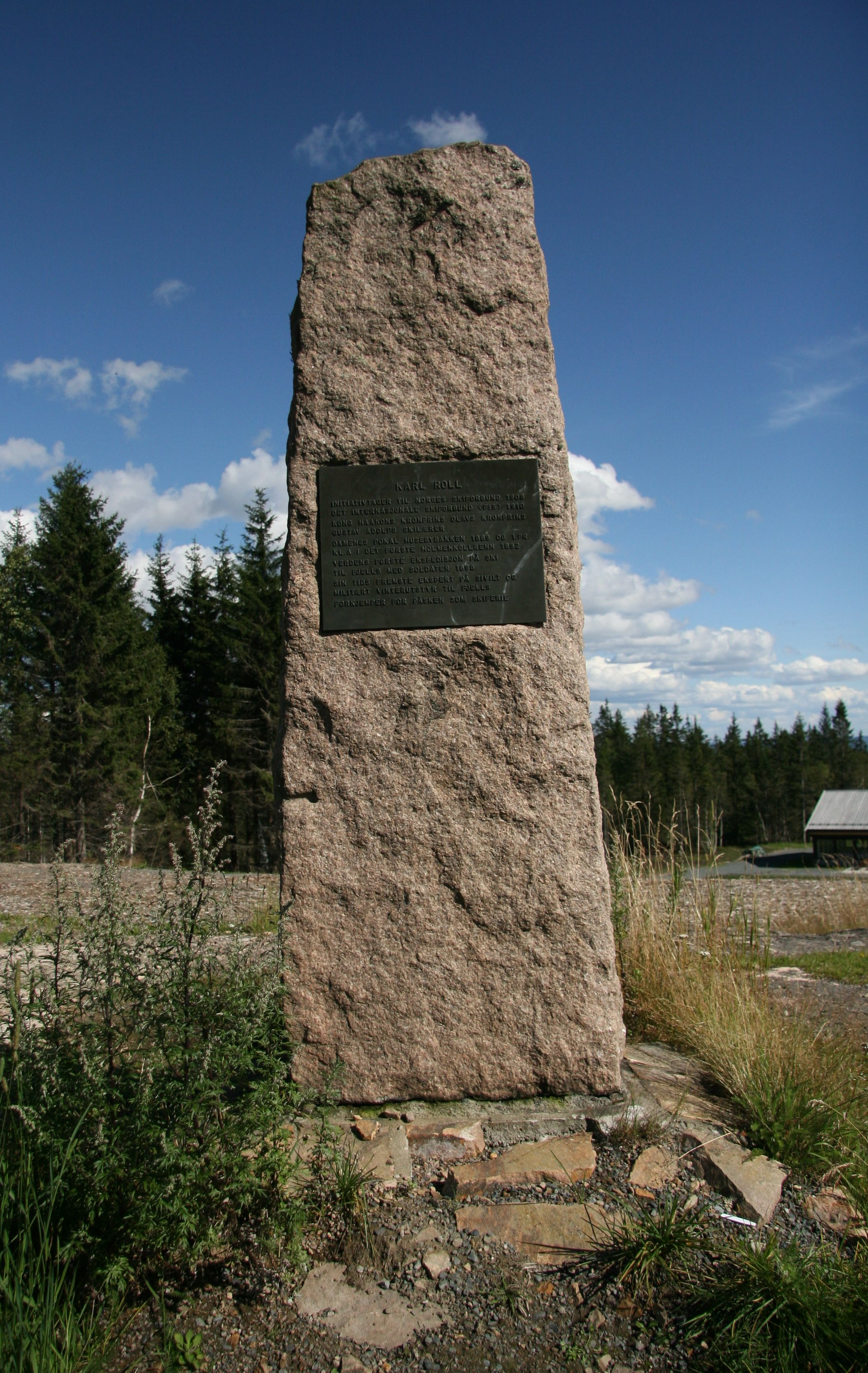
Memorial of Karl Roll at Tryvannshøyden, Norway

Karl Nikolai Roll (14 March 1868 – 29 September 1958) was a Norwegian sports official, skier and military officer.

== Personal life ==
Roll was born in Trondhjem as a son of vicar Karl Jakob Roll (1829–1887) and Anne Johanne Parelius (1839–1908). On his maternal side, he was a great-grandson of Jacob von der Lippe Parelius. On his paternal side, he was a grandson of Jacob Roll and Nicoline Selmer, and a nephew of Oluf Nicolai Roll, Ferdinand Nicolai Roll and Selma Roll. Through his aunt Selma, he was a first cousin of Arthur and Jacob Roll Knagenhjelm. Through Ferdinand he was also a first cousin of Nini Roll Anker.

Karl Roll grew up in Kristiania. In December 1908 he married Marie Mathe Auke.

== Career ==
He took the examen artium in 1886, graduated from the Norwegian Military Academy in 1889, from the Norwegian Military College in 1893 and from the gymnastics school in 1896. He was an active skier, who won the Ladies' Cup in Husebyrennet in 1889. At the first Holmenkollen Ski Festival of 1892 he finished second in the Nordic combined contest. He was a member of SK Ull since 1889, and served as chairman from 1905 to 1910.

In 1894, he was employed as a secretary in the Association for the Promotion of Skiing, where he was responsible for their first yearbook in 1895. From 1898, he concentrated on his military career, as he was dispatched to Stockholm. Roll was promoted to captain in 1900, remained in Stockholm until 1904 and was responsible for ski tutoring in the Swedish royal family. When Norway abolished the personal union with Sweden and established its own monarchy in 1905, Roll served as aide-de-camp for Haakon VII of Norway from 1905 to 1907. Roll was also a member of the military winter gear commission, and advanced to major in 1914, lieutenant colonel in 1916 and colonel in 1919.

Roll was a co-founder and served as the first chairman of the Norwegian Ski Federation, from 1908 to 1910. He was instrumental when the Norwegian Confederation of Sports (Norges Riksforbund for Idræt) was created, and also worked with an international ski commission.

Roll was decorated as a Knight, First Class of the Order of St. Olav in 1933, Knight of the Order of the Dannebrog and the Order of Vasa. He became an honorary member of SK Ull in 1951, and also of the Ski Club of Great Britain. Karl Roll died in September 1958 in Oslo, and a memorial stone of was unveiled near Tryvannstårnet in 1968.

Sporting positions
Preceded by Vilhelm Heiberg	Chairman of the Association for the Promotion of Skiing; 1902–1906	Succeeded by Frimann Dahl
