= Sørlandets Travpark =

Racing track in Kristiansand, Norway

Coordinates: 58°10′51″N 8°09′14″E

- Location: Kristiansand, Norway
- Owned by: Norwegian Trotting Association
- Date opened: 16 July 1988
- Course type: Harness racing

Sørlandets Travpark is a harness racing track located in Kristiansand, Norway. The course is 1,000 meters (3,300 ft). Owned by Norwegian Trotting Association, its tote betting is handled by Norsk Rikstoto. The venue opened on 16 July 1988.
