= Johan Baumann =

Norwegian sports administrator (1934–2026)

- Born: 8 August 1934; Oslo, Norway
- Died: 16 July 2026 (aged 91); Drammen, Norway
- Education: Norwegian Military Academy
- Occupations: Sports administrator, politician
- Organisation(s): Association for the Promotion of Skiing; Norwegian Ski Federation
- Known for: Six national titles in dogsledding

Johan Baumann (8 August 1934 – 16 July 2026) was a Norwegian dogsledder, sports administrator, and politician. He was president of the Norwegian Ski Federation from 1987 to 1995.

== Life and career ==
Born in Oslo on 8 August 1934, Baumann was the son of wholesaler Arne Baumann and Gerd Kunst. He was educated at the Norwegian Military Academy, and ended his service for the Norwegian Army in 1972 with the rank of major.

From 1972 to 1978 he chaired the Association for the Promotion of Skiing, and served as president of the Norwegian Ski Federation from 1987 to 1995. He won six national titles in dogsledding and was awarded the King's Cup in 1960.

He also represented the Conservative Party in Drammen city council, from 1995 to 2019, and was elected to Viken county council in 2019.

Buamann died on 16 July 2026, at the age of 91.

Sporting positions
Preceded by Per Ottesen	President of the Norwegian Ski Federation; 1987–1995	Succeeded by Jan Jensen
