= Toralf Lyng =

Norwegian sports official (1909–2005)

Toralf Lyng (6 July 1909 – 29 October 2005) was a Norwegian sports official.

He was born in Voss Municipality as the son of judge Ulrik Fredrik Lange Lyng (1868–1948) and Marie Aars Kaurin (1870–1951). In December 1939 he married Grethe Jørgensen (1913–2001). During the occupation of Norway by Nazi Germany he was imprisoned in Bredtveit concentration camp in January 1945, and was also held at Victoria Terrasse.

He was the secretary-general of the Association for the Promotion of Skiing from 1947 to 1957, head of the venue office of the 1952 Winter Olympics from 1949 to 1952, and secretary-general of the Norwegian Trekking Association from 1957 to 1977. He was decorated as a Knight, First Class of the Order of St. Olav in 1969. Lyng was also admitted into the exclusive skiing-based social club SK Ull in 1950, two years after the death of his father, who was also an Ull member.

Sporting positions
Preceded by Jakob Vaage	Secretary-general of the Association for the Promotion of Skiing; 1947–1956	Succeeded by Arild Smith-Kielland
