= Bergen Travpark =

Horse racing venue in Bergen, Norway

Coordinates: 60.4859°N 5.3867°E

- Location: Åsane, Bergen, Norway
- Owned by: Norwegian Trotting Association
- Date opened: 15 June 1985
- Course type: Harness racing

Bergen Travpark is a harness racing track at Åsane in Bergen, Norway. The course is 1,000 meters (3,300 ft). Owned by Norwegian Trotting Association, its tote betting is handled by Norsk Rikstoto. The venue opened on 15 June 1985.
