= Drammen Travbane =

Harness racing track in Drammen, Norway

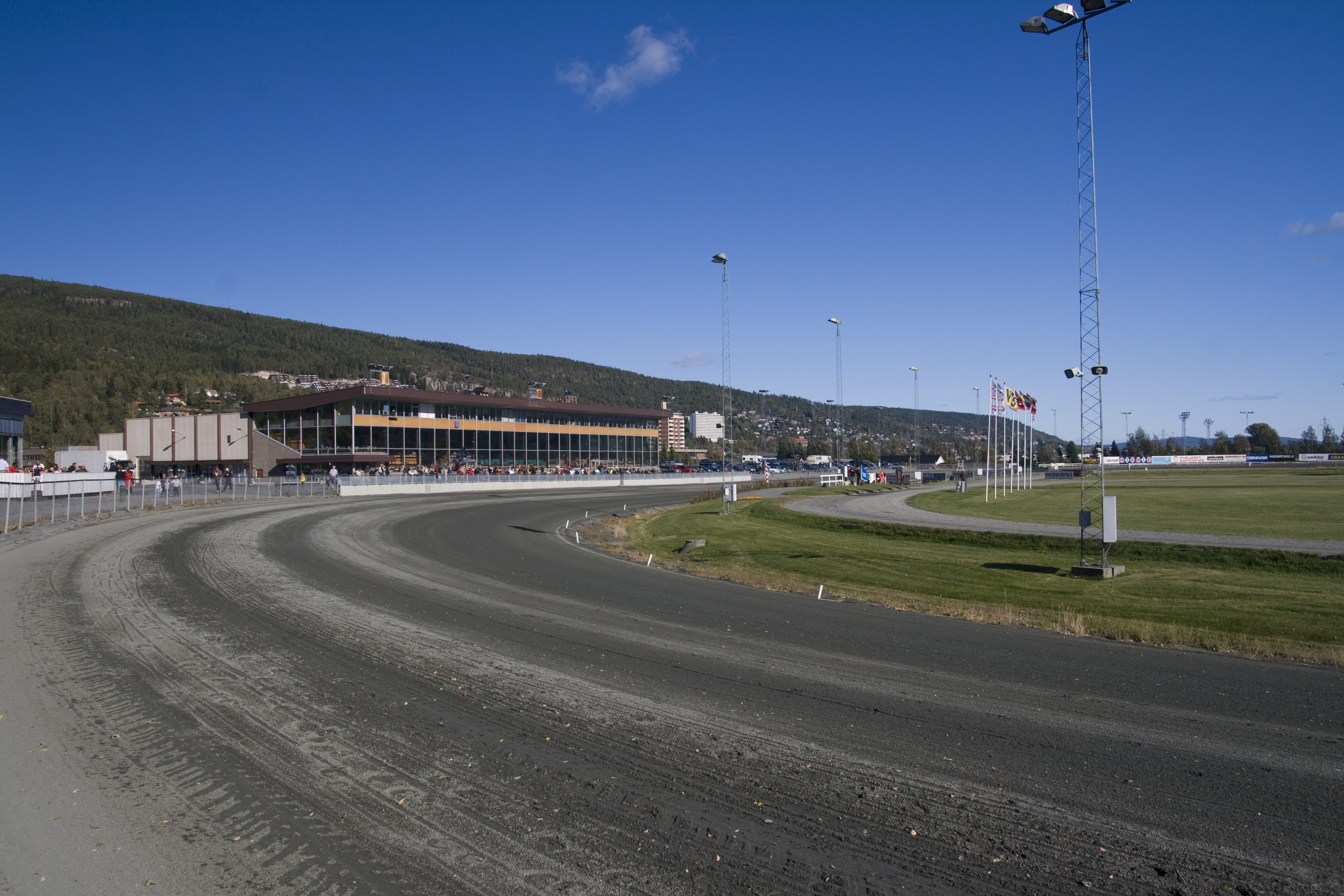
- Location: Drammen, Norway
- Coordinates: 59°45′23″N 10°06′49″E
- Owned by: Norwegian Trotting Association
- Date opened: 30 May 1955
- Course type: Harness racing

Drammen Travbane was a harness racing track located in Drammen, Norway. The course is 800 meters (2,600 ft). Owned by Norwegian Trotting Association, its tote betting is handled by Norsk Rikstoto. The venue opened in 1955 and closed in 2019.

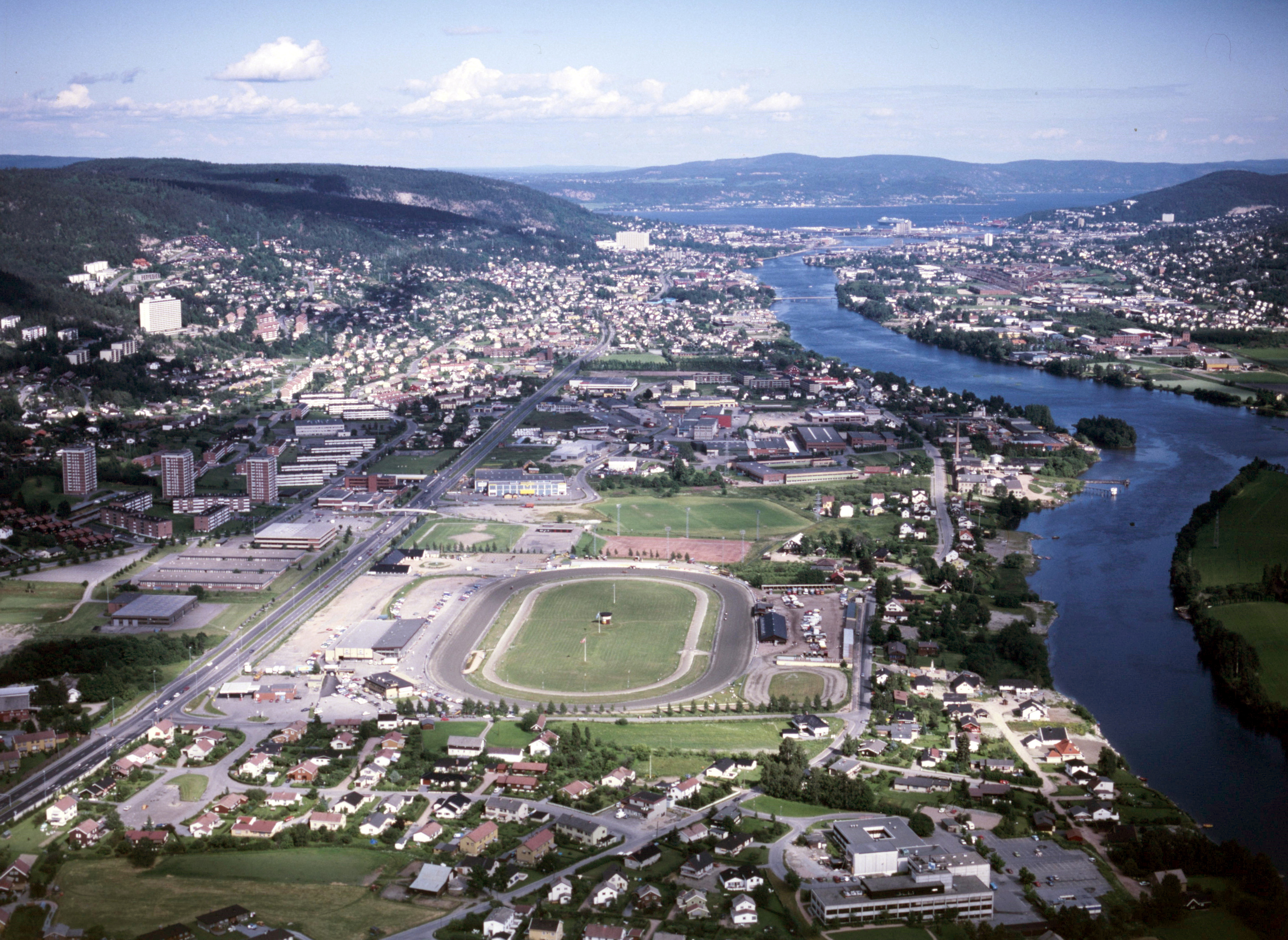
Aerial photo of Drammen Travbane (1985). Credit: Bjørn Østrem
