= Odd Seim-Haugen =

Odd Seim-Haugen (26 June 1937 – 3 July 2015) was a Norwegian barrister and sports official.

He started his own law firm in 1966, and in 1970 he became a barrister with access to work with Supreme Court cases. Outside of his legal career, he devoted his time to alpine skiing, ski jumping and cross-country skiing. He headed the organizing committees for Holmenkollen Kandahar (1970–1974), Holmenkollen Ski Festival (1977–1982) and the FIS Nordic World Ski Championships 1982, served as president of the Norwegian Ski Federation from 1982 to 1985 and council member of the International Ski Federation including one term as vice president. He also sat on the Court of Arbitration for Sport (CAS) from 1995.

He chaired Norefjell Ski Resort from 1970 to 1979 and the Association for the Promotion of Skiing from 1973 to 1978. In 1993 he became a member of the gentlemen's club SK Ull, chairing it from 2004 to 2011. He was an honorary member of the Association for the Promotion of Skiing from 1978, SK Ull from 2012 as well as the International Ski Federation.

He resided at Hosle. He died in 2015.

Sporting positions
Preceded by	Chairman of the Association for the Promotion of Skiing; 1973–1978	Succeeded by
Preceded by Kjell Johnsrud	Chairman of the Norwegian Ski Federation; 1982–1985	Succeeded by Per Ottesen
Preceded by	Chairman of SK Ull; 2004–2011	Succeeded by
