= Biri Travbane =

Racing track in Biri, Gjøvik, Norway

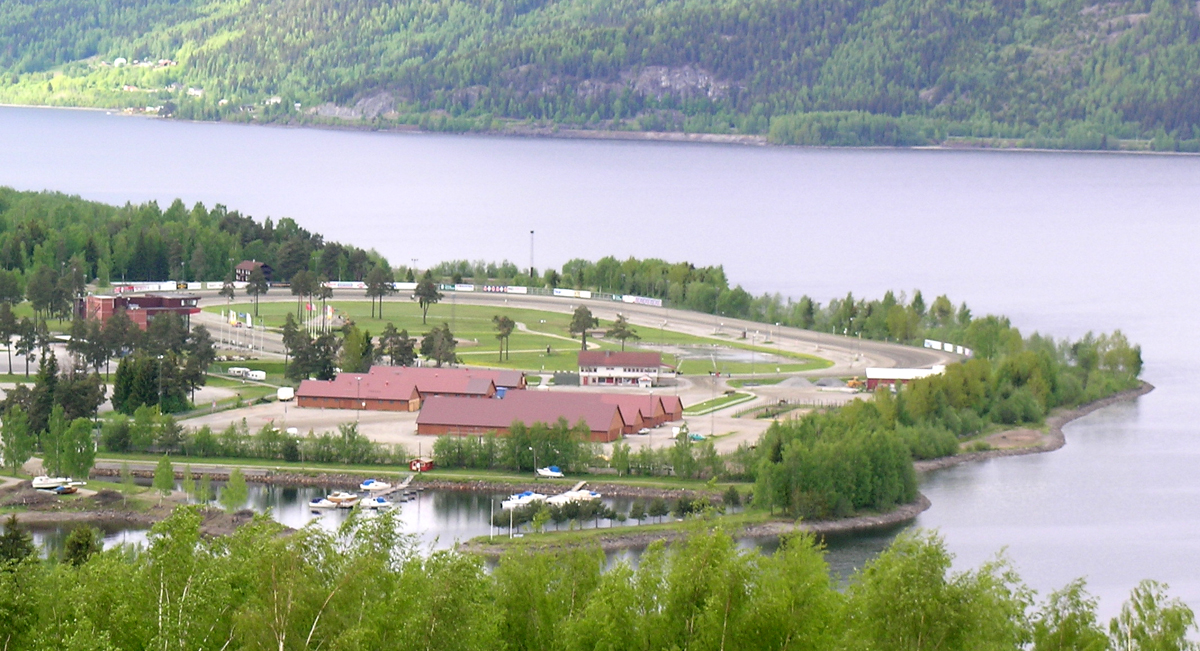
- Location: Biri, Gjøvik, Norway
- Coordinates: 60°57′32″N 10°37′37″E
- Owned by: Norwegian Trotting Association
- Date opened: 1985
- Course type: Harness racing

Biri Travbane is a harness racing track located at Biri in Gjøvik, Norway. The course is 1,000 meters (3,300 ft). Owned by Norwegian Trotting Association, its tote betting is handled by Norsk Rikstoto. The venue opened in 1985.
