= Momarken Travbane =

Harness racing track in Norway

Coordinates: 59°34′15″N 11°19′59″E

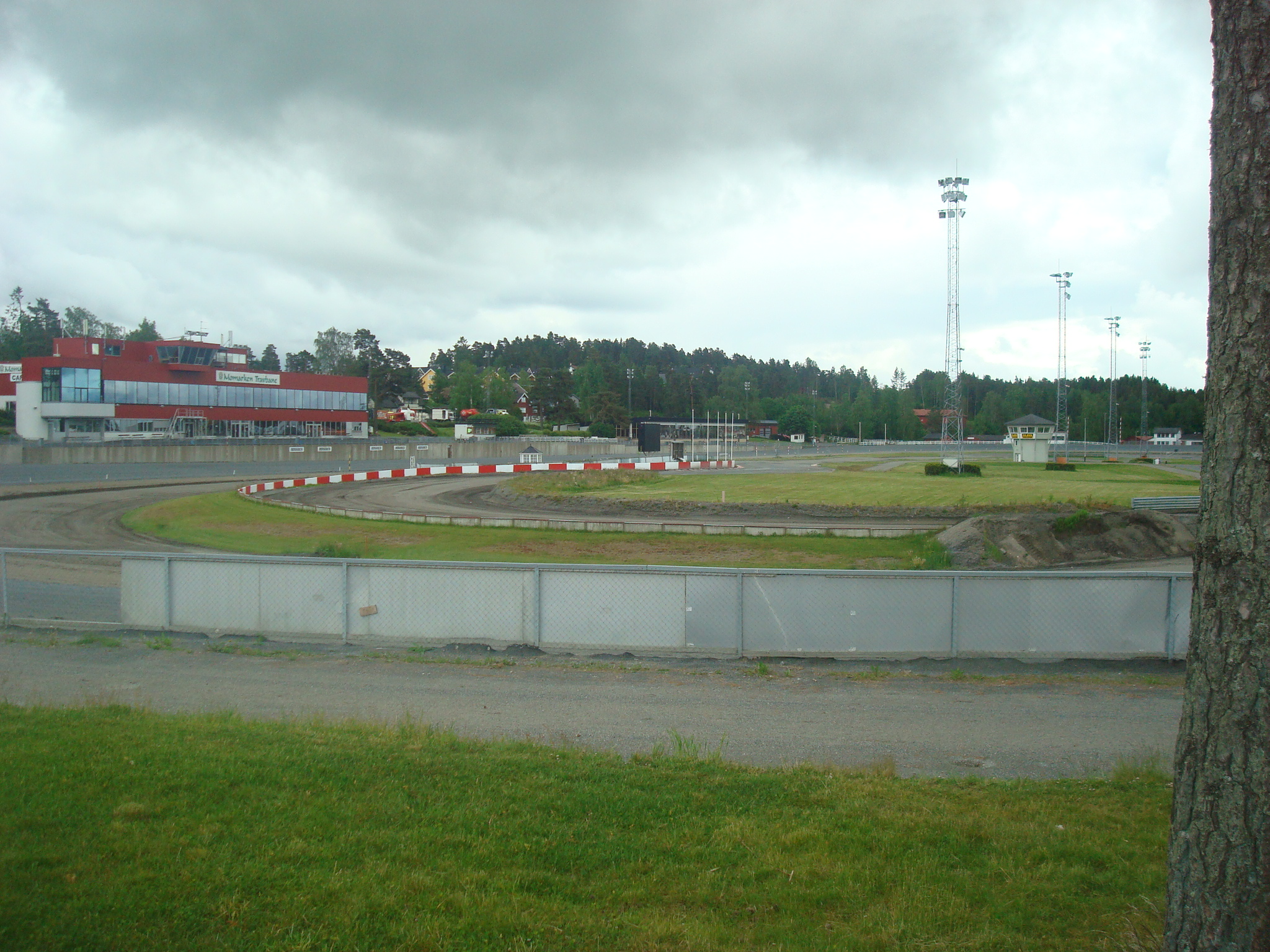
- Location: Momarken, Eidsberg, Norway
- Owned by: Norwegian Trotting Association
- Date opened: 1920
- Course type: Harness racing

Momarken Travbane is a harness racing track located at Momarken in Eidsberg, Norway. The course is 1,000 meters (3,300 ft). Owned by Norwegian Trotting Association, its tote betting is handled by Norsk Rikstoto. The venue opened in 1920.
