= Klosterskogen Travbane =

Racing track in Skien, Norway

Coordinates: 59°11′22″N 9°35′54″E

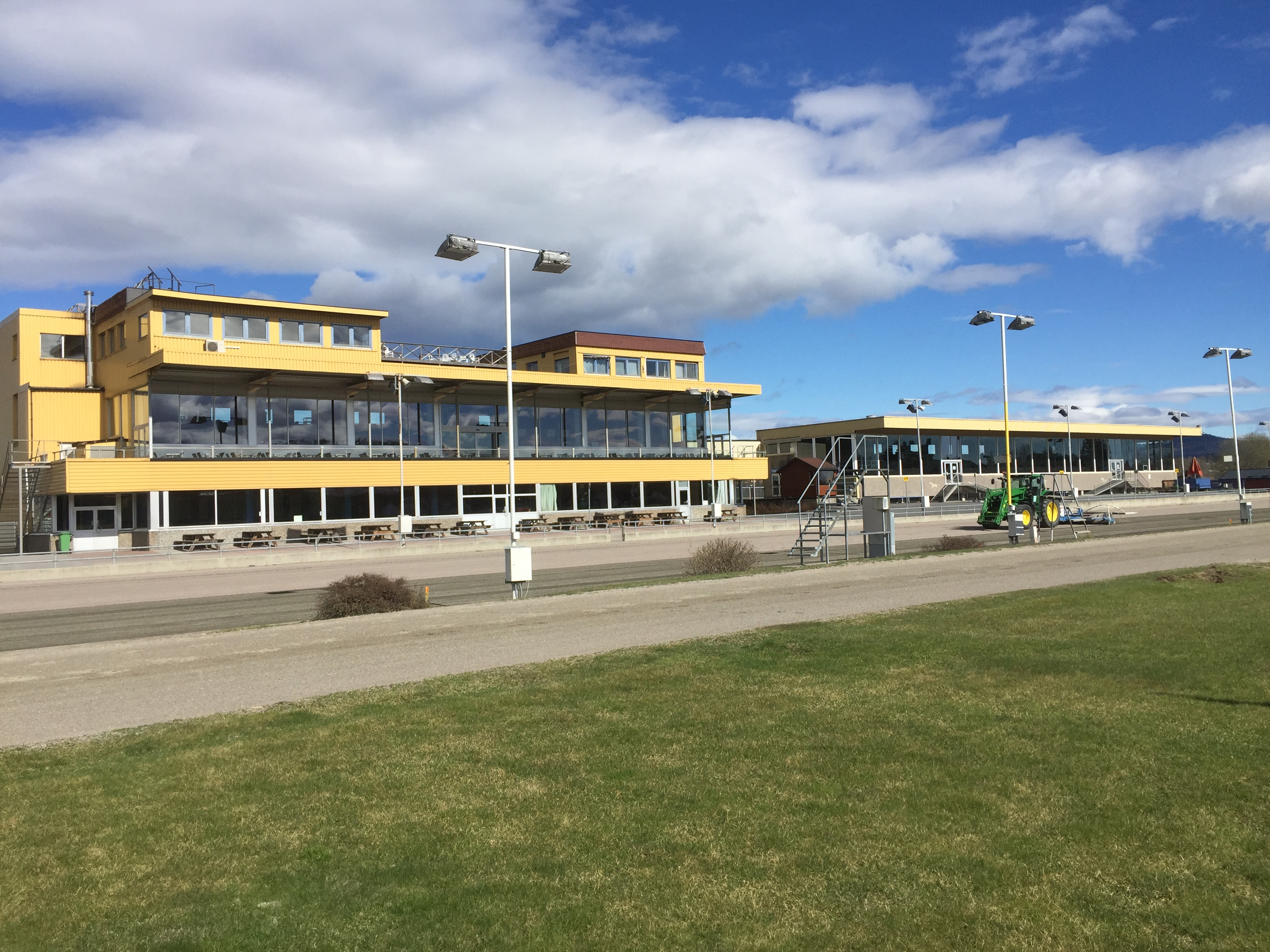
- Klosterskogen Travbane
- Interactive map of Klosterskogen Travbane
- Location: Klosterskogen, Skien, Norway
- Owned by: Norwegian Trotting Association
- Course type: Harness racing
- Notable races: Habibs Minneløp; Klosterskogen Grand Prix

Klosterskogen Travbane is a harness racing track located at Klosterskogen in Skien, Norway. The course is 800 meters (2,600 ft). Owned by Norwegian Trotting Association, its tote betting is handled by Norsk Rikstoto.

== Notable races ==
- Klosterskogen Grand Prix
- Moe Odins Æresløp
- Thai Tanics Æresløp
- Prince Royals Minneløp
- Habibs Minneløp
