= Rolf Hansen =

Rolf Hansen may refer to:

- Rolf Hansen (athlete) (1906–1980), Norwegian long-distance runner
- Rolf Hansen (director) (1904–1990), German film director
- Rolf Arthur Hansen (1920–2006), Norwegian politician
- Rolf Willy Hansen (born 1949), Norwegian diplomat
- Rolf Bloch Hansen (1894–1981), Norwegian military officer and skiing official
- Rolf Morgan Hansen (born 1961), Norwegian Olympic cyclist
