= Fritz R. Huitfeldt =

Norwegian sports official and writer (1851–1938)

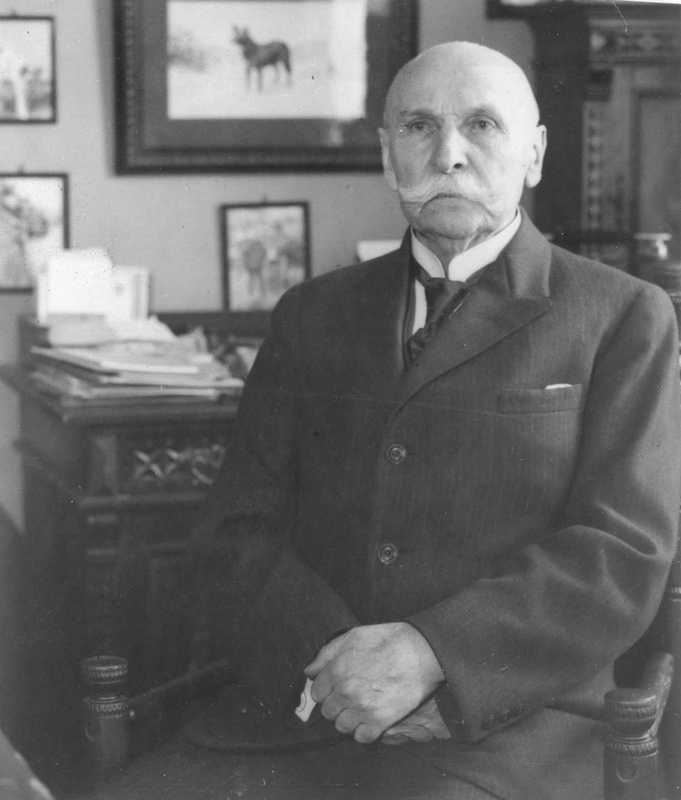
Huitfeldt, c. 1930

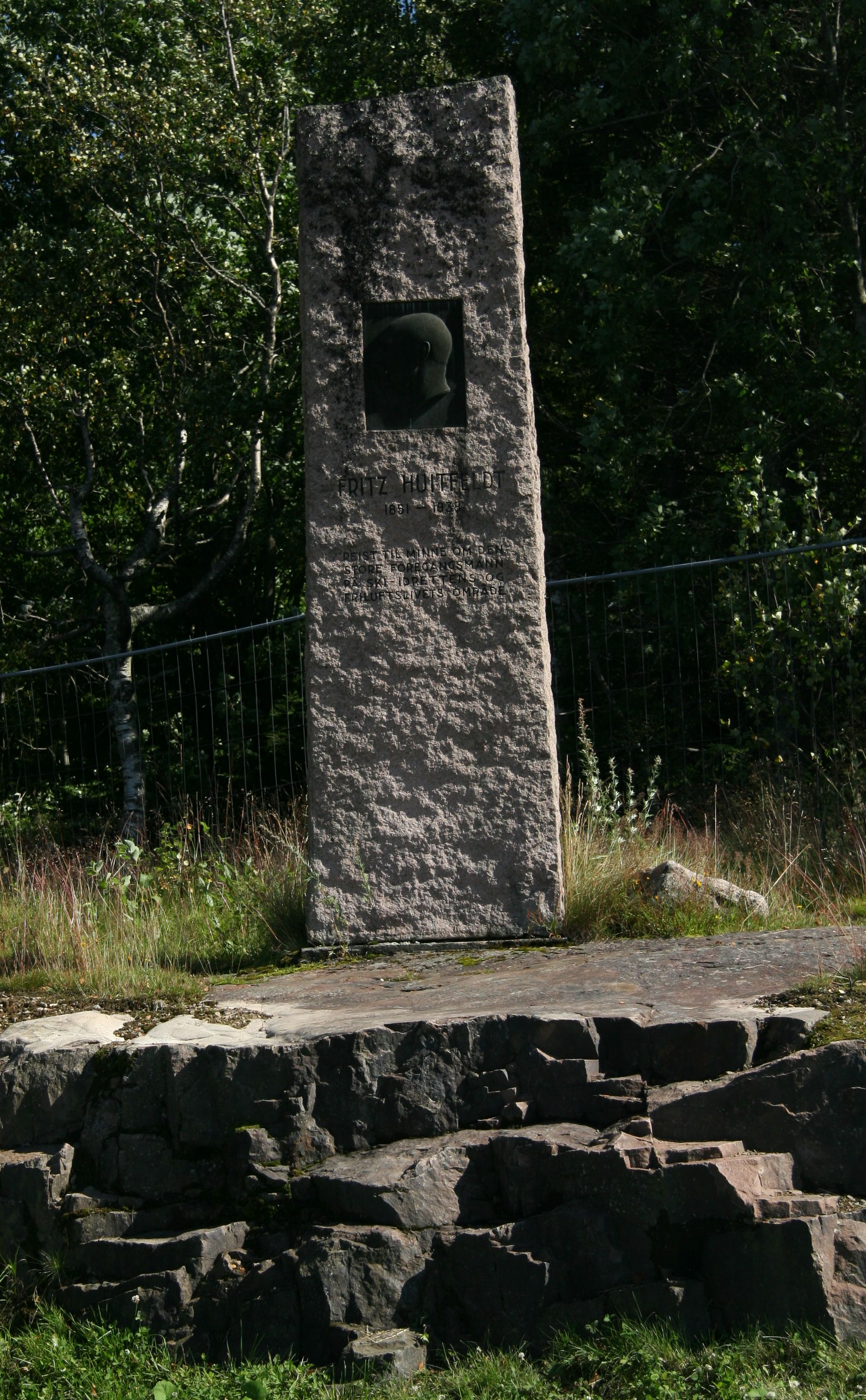
Memorial of Fritz R. Huitfeldt at Tryvannshøyden, Norway

Nicolay Fritz Reichwein Huitfeldt (19 May 1851 – 24 April 1938) was a Norwegian sports official, writer and producer of skis and ski bindings.

== Biography ==
He was born on 19 May 1851, in Borgund Municipality, the son of stipendiary magistrate Hans Jørgen Hansen Huitfeldt (1806–1857) and Fredrikke Ambjørnsen (1815–1897). The family also lived in Fredrikstad during Fritz' childhood, but when he was 13 years old the family moved to Christiania. He was a distant descendant of Tønne Huitfeldt. He was married twice; first between 1894 and 1900 to singer Marie Gløersen, then from September 1906 to Asta Marie Andersen (1877–1966). Through his sister, Fritz Huitfeldt was a brother-in-law of his own cousin Henrik Jørgen Huitfeldt-Kaas.

He took the examen artium in 1870 and the "second examen" in 1872. Until 1880, he ran two sports stores, first in Drammen and later in Skien. He was then hired in a weapons store in Kristiania. He started his own sports store in the city in 1891, but was employed in another store between 1896 and 1915. He also ran a ski factory named Ull. He became famous all over the skiing world for his "Huitfeldt ski bindings", pioneered in 1894 with significant improvements in 1897 and 1904. His bindings and skis were used by ski jumpers, cross-country skiers and alpine skiers alike.

Huitfeldt released several books about skiing, hunting and angling, and was an avid skier. He was a member of SK Ull from its founding year, served as its first deputy chairman (from 1883 to 1885) and its third chairman (from 1887 to 1891). He especially promoted the Telemark style of skiing, but was also involved in ski jumping. From 1886 to 1893, he was employed as a secretary in the Association for the Promotion of Skiing. Together with Hans Krag he was responsible for discontinuing the Husebyrennet and creating the hill Holmenkollbakken which arranged the Holmenkollen Ski Festival from 1892.

He died on 24 April 1938, aged 86, in Oslo. A monument to him was unveiled near Tryvannstårnet in 1946.
