= Jarlsberg Travbane =

Horse racing track in Tønsberg, Norway

Coordinates: 59°16′45″N 10°22′07″E

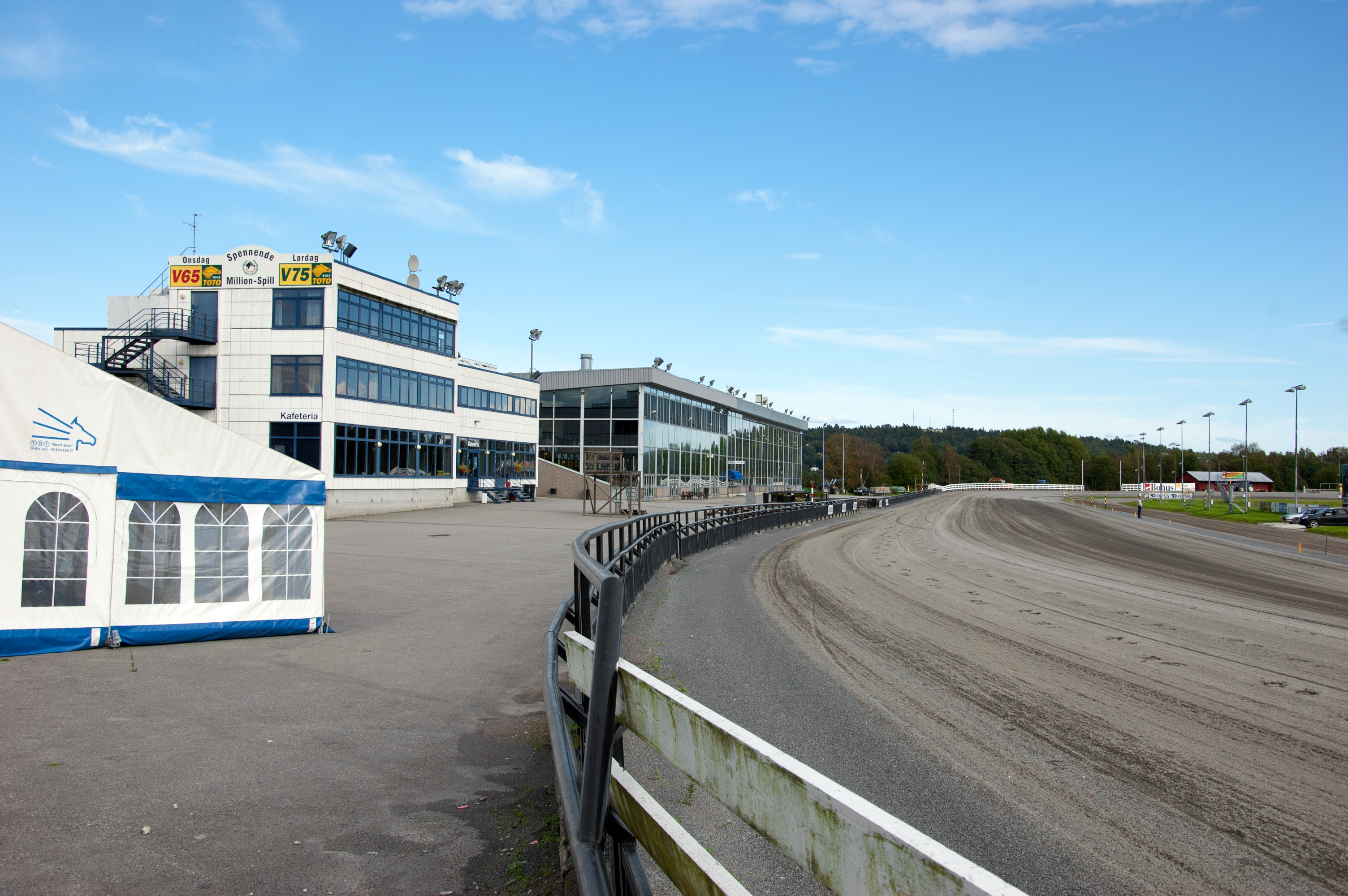
- Location: Tønsberg, Vestfold, Norway
- Owned by: Norwegian Trotting Association
- Date opened: 1935
- Course type: Harness racing
- Notable races: Ulf Thoresens Minneløp

Jarlsberg Travbane is a harness racing track located in Tønsberg, Norway. The course is 1,000 meters (3,300 ft). Owned by Norwegian Trotting Association, its tote betting is handled by Norsk Rikstoto. The venue opened in 1935.
