= Harstad Travpark =

Harness racing track in Harstad, Norway

Coordinates: 68°47′19″N 16°27′33″E

- Location: Langmoan, Harstad, Norway
- Owned by: Norwegian Trotting Association
- Date opened: 1995
- Course type: Harness racing

Harstad Travpark is a harness racing track located at Langmoan in Harstad, Norway. The course is 960 meters (3,150 ft). Owned by Norwegian Trotting Association, its tote betting is handled by Norsk Rikstoto. The venue opened in 1995.
