= Forus Travbane =

Racing track in Forus, Stavanger, Norway

Coordinates: 58°53′27″N 5°43′29″E

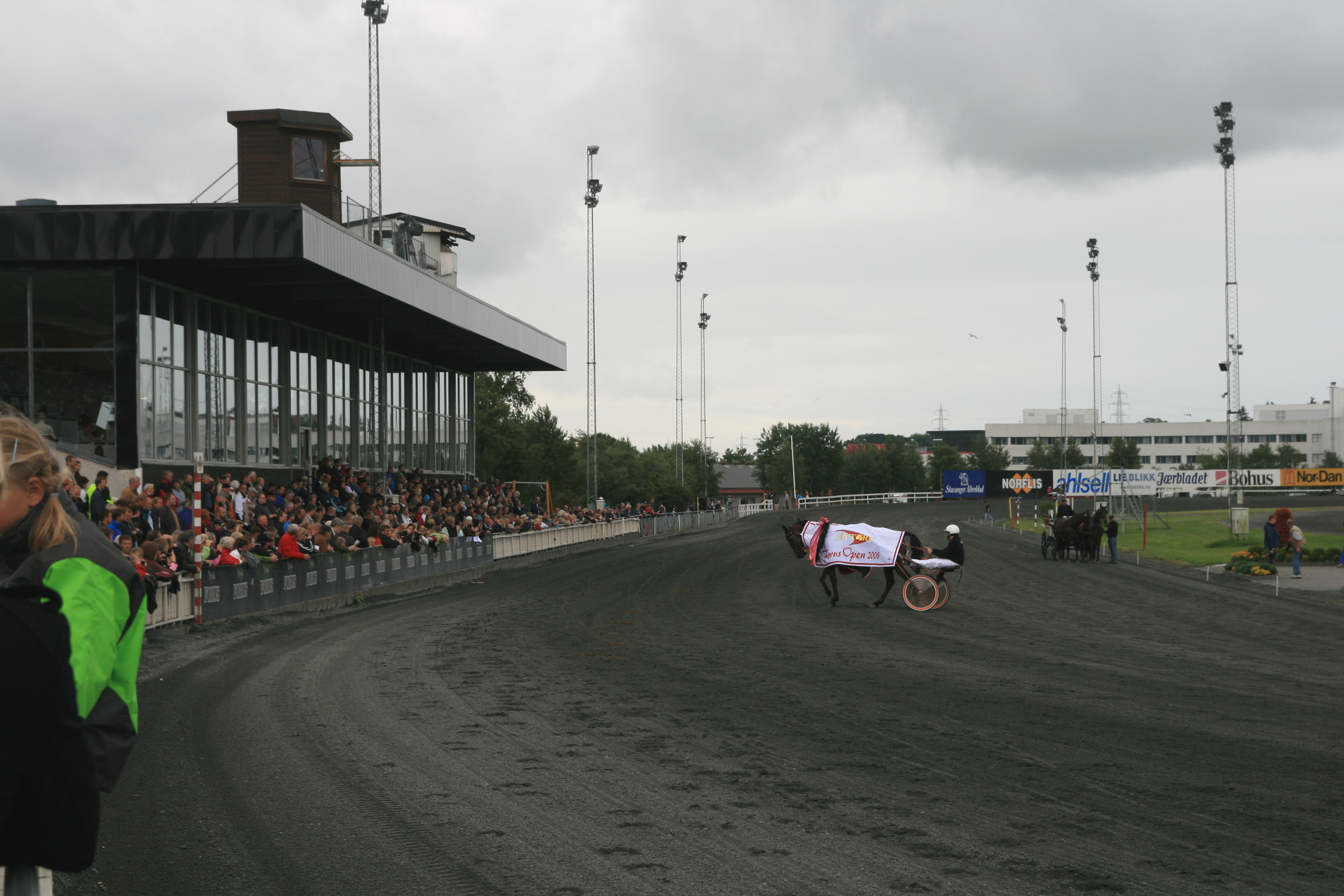
- Location: Forus, Stavanger, Norway
- Owned by: Norwegian Trotting Association
- Date opened: 6 June 1920
- Course type: Harness racing

Forus Travbane is a harness racing track located at Forus in Stavanger, Norway. The course is 950 meters (3,120 ft). Owned by Norwegian Trotting Association, its tote betting is handled by Norsk Rikstoto. The venue opened in 1920.
