= Alf Scott-Hansen =

Alf Scott-Hansen may refer to:

- Alf Scott-Hansen Sr. (1870–1936), Norwegian engineer and civil servant
- Alf Scott-Hansen Jr. (1903–1961), his son, Norwegian engineer and film director
