= Bjerke Travbane =

Race track in Norway

Coordinates: 59°56′25″N 10°48′47″E

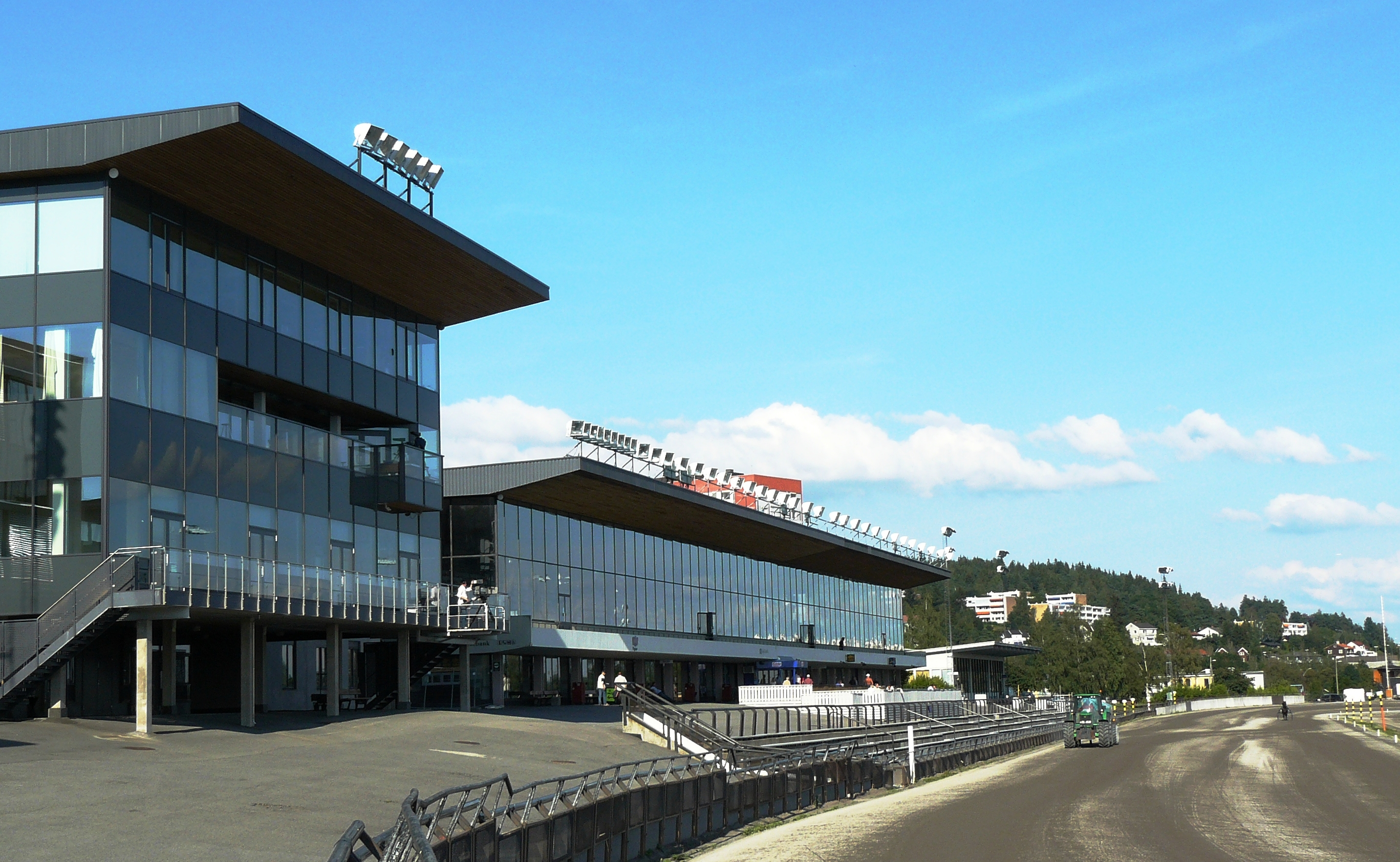
- Interactive map of Bjerke Travbane
- Location: Bjerke, Oslo, Norway
- Owned by: Norwegian Trotting Association
- Date opened: 24 June 1928
- Course type: Harness racing
- Notable races: Oslo Grand Prix

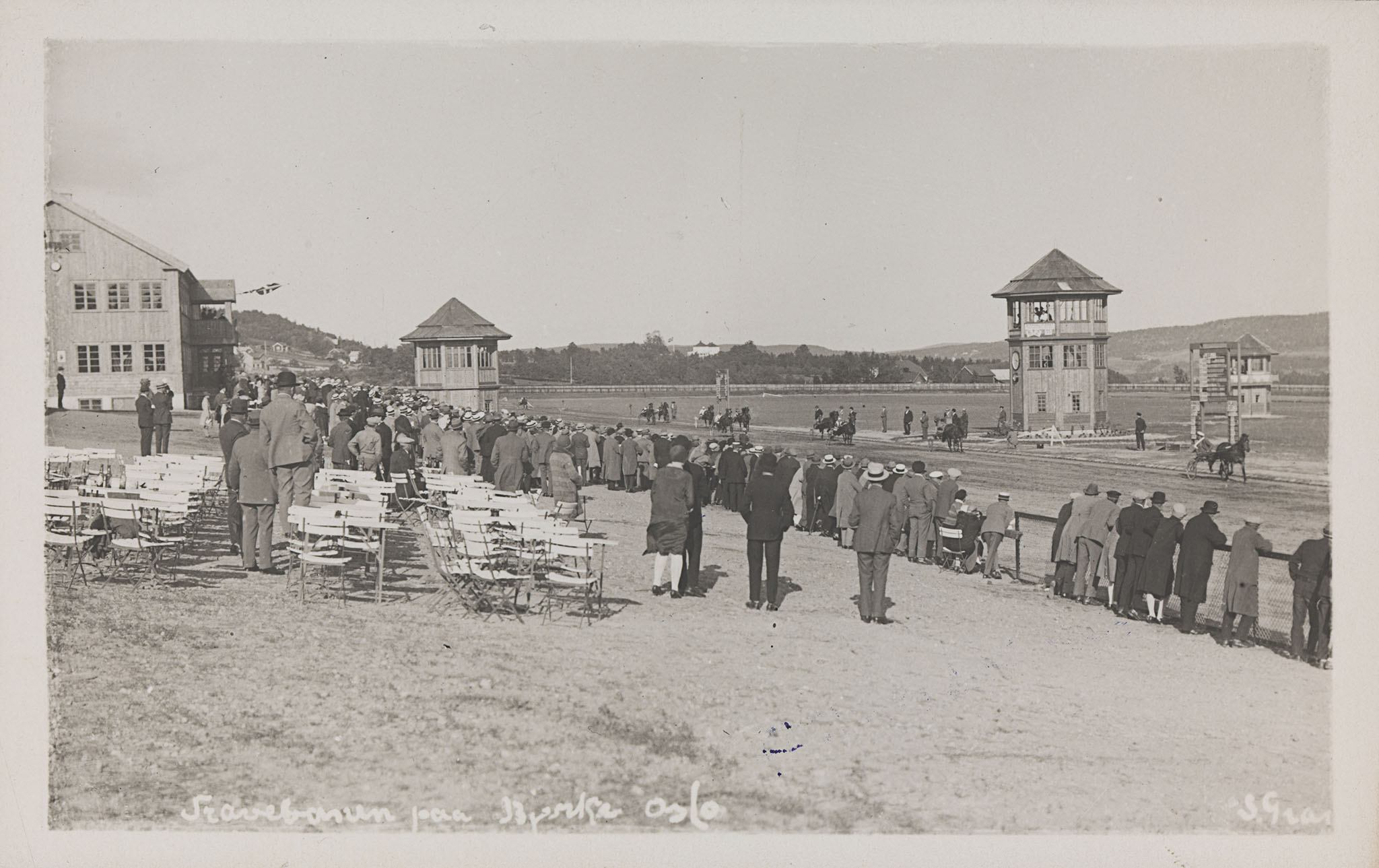
1929

Bjerke Travbane (English: Bjerke Race Track) is a harness racing track located in the Bjerkebanen neighborhood of the Bjerke borough in Oslo, Norway. The course is 1,000 meters (3,300 ft). Owned by Norwegian Trotting Association, its tote betting is handled by Norsk Rikstoto. The venue opened in 1928 and is the busiest harness racetrack in Norway, with 115 racedays in 2012.

== Notable race ==
- Oslo Grand Prix
