= Odd Harsheim =

Norwegian orienteer

Odd Harsheim (20 July 1924 – 21 June 1994) was a Norwegian goldsmith, military officer, multi-sportsperson and sports official.

As a sportsman he was best known for his profess in sailing. In the 5.5 Metre event at the 1956 Summer Olympics he was a crew for Peder Lunde in the boat Viking. They finished fifth. In the 5.5 Metre event at the 1960 Summer Olympics he was a crew for Finn Ferner in the boat Struten. They finished seventh. Harsheim represented the Royal Norwegian Yacht Club.

He also competed on a national level in orienteering, biathlon, Nordic combined and ski jumping. He won the Ladies' Cup at the Holmenkollen Ski Festival in 1946. For many years past his active age he was active in the Association for the Promotion of Skiing. He chaired the organizational committee for the Holmenkollen Ski Festival from 1959 to 1961, having previously led the ski jumping contest since 1956. He was a council member of the Association for the Promotion of Skiing until 1986. He was admitted to the exclusive social club for skiers, SK Ull, in 1983. He served as the club's chairman from 1992 until his death in 1994.

He studied in the United States, and worked as a goldsmith in the family company Lars Harsheim. He also became involved in the military, starting during the Second World War. He joined Milorg in the Norwegian resistance to the German occupation, and was imprisoned in Grini concentration camp from 15 May to 1 July 1942. He was decorated with the Defence Medal 1940–1945. After the war he became a conscript officer in the Norwegian Home Guard, and in 1963 he became the first leader of the Skier Company (Norwegian: Skiløperkompaniet) in the home guard district HV-02, and remained so until 1978. He was also a board member of the Norwegian Conscript Officers' Federation.
