= Per Ottesen =

Norwegian sports official (1932–2026)

Per Ottesen (19 October 1932 – 16 June 2026) was a Norwegian sports official.

== Life and career ==
Hailing from Trondheim, Ottesen chaired Byåsen IL and Sør-Trøndelag District Skiing Association. In 1982 he became vice president of the Norwegian Ski Federation, being elected president in 1985. He is largely credited with landing the 1997 FIS Nordic World Ski Championships in his hometown. Ottesen also led the World Championships organizational committee; however, after falling out with managing director Carl Petter Brun, he resigned only 93 days before the opening ceremony.

Ottesen was decorated with the King's Medal of Merit in gold. He died on 16 June 2026, at the age of 93.

Sporting positions
Preceded by Odd Seim-Haugen	President of the Norwegian Ski Federation; 1985–1987	Succeeded by Johan Baumann
