= Jakob Vaage =

Norwegian skier and author (1905–1994)

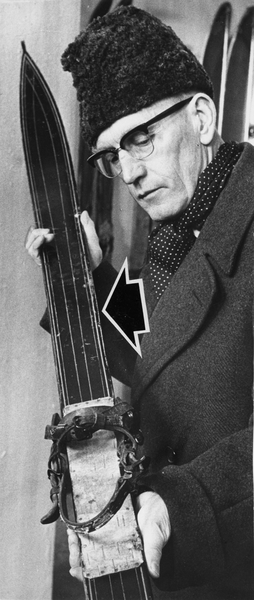
Jakob Vaage

Jakob Vaage (9 February 1905 – 29 January 1994) was a Norwegian educator, author and historian. He served as secretary of the Association for the Promotion of Skiing and curator of the Holmenkollen Ski Museum.

== Biography ==
Vaage was born in Aker, Norway. His parents were Jakob Vaage (1862–1953) and Mathilde Gundersen (1866–1953). He was raised in the Oslo neighborhood of Lilleaker. Vaage studied science at the University of Oslo, where he became cand.real. in 1931 with a botany major. His specialty was plants of the Arctics. He was employed as a high school teacher in Ullern from 1934 until he retired in 1972.

During the occupation of Norway by Nazi Germany, he was imprisoned along with hundred of other Norwegian school teachers. He was incarcerated in Bredtveit concentration camp from March 1942, then in Grini concentration camp for some days. On 31 March he was moved to Jørstadmoen, later to Kirkenes. He was released in November 1942.

As a skier in Ullern SK, he was also goalkeeper for the team that in 1937 played Norway's first handball match against SK Arild at Akershus Fortress and afterwards founded the Norwegian Handball Federation. He was admitted to the SK Ull skiing club in 1947. He served as deputy chairman from 1970 to 1973 and chairman from 1973 to 1992. He served as secretary of the Norwegian-based Association for the Promotion of Skiing from 1945 to 1947, and curator of the Holmenkollen Ski Museum in Oslo from 1946 to 1984. He wrote many books about Norwegian skiing including Skikongen Lauritz Bergendahl (1975) and Den satt! og andre nye og gamle skihistorier (1983. with Birger Ruud).

== Personal life ==
He was married in 1938 to Berit Gerd Andersen (1918–1995). He received the Medal of St. Hallvard in 1976. For his historical works regarding Holmenkollen, Vaage earned the Holmenkollen medal (Holmenkollmedaljen) in 1984. Vaage died during 1994 and was buried at Ullern kirkegård in Oslo.

A stone monument to Vaage at Lilleaker Station in Oslo was unveiled in 2000. It was designed by sculptor Nils Aas (1933–2004).

Sporting positions
Preceded by Rolf Bloch Hansen	Secretary of the Association for the Promotion of Skiing; 1945–1947	Succeeded by Toralf Lyng
