= Otto Dahl =

Otto Dahl may refer to:

- Otto Dahl (politician) (1914–1978), Norwegian politician
- Otto Dahl (engineer) (1864–1938), Norwegian engineer and sportsman
- Otto Christian Dahl (1903–1995), Norwegian missionary, linguist, and government scholar

== See also ==
- Ottar Dahl (1924–2011), Norwegian historian and historiographer
