= Jan Jensen (skiing) =

Norwegian sports official (1944–2002)

Jan Jensen (14 July 1944 – 22 October 2002) was a Norwegian sports official.

Jensen chaired Østfold District Skiing Association and Østfold District Federation of Sports. In 1994, he was elected deputy vice president of the Norwegian Confederation of Sports, stepping down to status of board member in 1995, when he was elected president of the Norwegian Ski Federation. In 1999, he was a contender for the presidency of the Norwegian Confederation of Sports, but at the national convention he lost the vote to Kjell O. Kran, and left the board as well. He remained president of the Norwegian Skiing Federation until his death from cancer in October 2002. He had been a council member of the International Ski Federation since the spring of 2002.

Sporting positions
Preceded by Johan Baumann	President of the Norwegian Ski Federation; 1995–2002	Succeeded by Sverre Seeberg
