= Sigurd Gotaas =

Norwegian physician and sportsman

Sigurd Gotaas (21 December 1863 – 1944) was a Norwegian physician and sportsman.

He was born in Ullensaker Municipality. Gotaas was the first vice chairman of the skiing club SK Ull from 1883 to 1885, then the second to serve as chairman from 1885 to 1887. He participated in Husebyrennet, one of the main skiing events of the time. He later participated in motor sports, and was known in dog breeding circles. In 1907 he founded a club for pointer breeders, Norsk Pointerklub.

He graduated with the cand.med. degree in 1892. After serving briefly in Trondhjem, he was municipal physician for Nord-Aurdal Municipality from 1892 to 1895, then a private physician in Lillestrøm. He eventually became municipal physician, and also physician for the garrison at Kjeller Airport. In the winter of 1939–1940 he served on board a large whaler in the Southern Ocean.

He died in 1944. His daughter Harda Sophie Borchgrevink Gotaas, whom he had together with Charlotte Frimann Dahl (1866–1965), married industrialist Odd Engelund.
