= Ulrik Fredrik Lange Lyng =

Norwegian judge

Ulrik Fredrik Lange Lyng (1868–1948) was a Norwegian judge.

He was born in Fanestranden near Molde. He finished his secondary education in 1891 and graduated with the cand.jur. degree in 1895. After several years as an attorney in Voss Municipality, he was appointed as an assessor in Kristiania City Court in 1913. In 1929 he was an acting chief justice of that court. He was also a conscript officer in the military, with the rank of captain. Lyng was also admitted into the exclusive skiing-based social club SK Ull in 1915. He was the only new member between 1908 and 1924. He served as manager of the club, overlooking its treasury and secretary functions, from 1919 to 1935.

Together with Marie Aars Kaurin (1870–1951) he had the son Toralf Lyng, a skiing administrator and organizational leader. Ulrik F. L. Lyng died in 1948.
