= Otto Dahl (engineer) =

Norwegian engineer and sports official

Axel Otto Dahl (9 June 1864 – 1938) was a Norwegian engineer and sportsman.

He was born at Nøsted in Lier as a son of Claus Frimann Dahl (1825–1913) and Gjerthrud Johanne Marie Thams (1840–1885). His paternal great-grandfather was counsellor of justice, Christian Lerche Dahl. In May 1911 he married Hildur Fredstad, daughter of a tanner in Kristiania. They had a daughter and a son.

He attended Aars og Voss from 1879, and finished his secondary education with the examen artium in sciences at the university in 1883. He attended the Norwegian Military Academy and graduated in 1885, and in the army he reached the ranks of Second Lieutenant in 1885, Premier Lieutenant in 1892, Captain in 1897 and Major in 1907. In 1885 he enrolled in Kristiania Technical School whence he graduated in 1888. From 1889 to 1890 he studied at the Technische Hochschule in Charlottenburg (now Technische Universität Berlin).

He worked for the Prussian state railway administration in Berlin until 1891, then returned to Norway and worked at the Hamar–Sel Line in Gudbrandsdalen for the Norwegian State Railways. He went on to found the company Norsk Kleber- og Skiferforretning in February 1897, and was its manager from May 1897 to November 1901. He then worked in the Public Roads Administration of Kristiania, and from 1906 in Kristiania Port Authority.

He was well known in sportsman circles. He was a founder of the skiing club SK Ull in 1883. He was the secretary-general of the Norwegian Trotting Association for ten years, and edited the harness racing calendar Norsk Travkalender. He was a judge in conformation dog shows, as an expert on scent hounds. He was the deputy chairman of Norsk Kennelklub from 1915 to 1922, and chaired the scent hound club from 1910 to 1915. He made a name as an expert in hunting with dogs. In 1926 he issued the book Jaktprat og bikkjeprat to a favourable review in Aftenposten.
