= Leangen =

Neighborhood in the city of Trondheim, Norway

- Neighborhood in Trondheim
- Interactive map of Leangen
- Coordinates: 63.4416°N 10.4564°E
- Country: Norway
- Region: Central Norway
- County: Trøndelag
- Municipality: Trondheim Municipality
- Borough: Østbyen
- Elevation: 31 m (102 ft)
- Time zone: UTC+01:00 (CET)
  - Summer (DST): UTC+02:00 (CEST)

Leangen is a largely industrial neighborhood in the city of Trondheim in Trøndelag county, Norway. It is located in the borough of Østbyen in Trondheim Municipality. It is the site of the Leangen Sports Complex (Leangen idrettsanlegg) which includes an indoor ice hockey arena Leangen Ice Hall (Leangen Ishall) and Leangen Sports Hall (Leangen idrettshall) an indoor running track and training facility. Leangen is also the location of Leangen Racecourse (Leangen Travbane), a harness racing course as well as a facility of Sør-Trøndelag University College.
