= Andreas Brandrud =

Norwegian church historian (1868–1957)

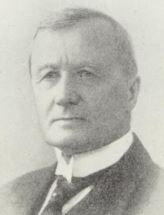
Andreas Brandrud

Andreas Brandrud (26 February 1868 – 14 June 1957) was a Norwegian professor, theologian and church historian.

== Biography ==
He was born in Sør-Fron Municipality as a son of farmer and merchant Torsten Brandrud (1837–1933) and Anna Bleken (1844–1879). In February 1897 he married dean's daughter Anna Broch Martens (1875–1966).

He came from a Haugean family and studied theology at the University of Kristiania. He got his cand.theol. degree in 1892. He made a study trip to Germany, where he studied under Reinhold Seeberg (1859–1935) in Erlangen and Adolf von Harnack (1851–1930) in Berlin. He also studied in Italy, Denmark and the United Kingdom. He became an assistant at the National Archives of Norway in 1896, then a professor at the Royal Frederick University from 1897 to 1938. As a researcher, Brandrud had Norwegian church history after the Reformation as his primary focus.

He was a fellow of the Norwegian Academy of Science and Letters from 1898, received an honorary degree at Lund University and the Order of the Polar Star. Brandrud was also admitted into the exclusive skiing-based social club SK Ull in 1889. He served as deputy chairman from 1905 to 1910, and chairman from 1910 to 1912 and 1940 to 1949.

== Selected works ==
- Klosterlasse. Et bidrag til den jesuitiske propagandas historie i Norden (1895)
- Den kristne kirkes historie. Et grundrids (1915)
- Stavanger domkapitels protokol 1571–1630 (1897–1901)
