= Bjerkebanen =

Bjerkebanen Bjerke
- Interactive map of Bjerkebanen
- Coordinates: 59°56′41″N 10°48′24″E
- Country: Norway

Population (2020)
  - Total: 33,422
- Time zone: GMT+1
- Website: https://www.oslo.kommune.no/bydeler/bydel-bjerke/

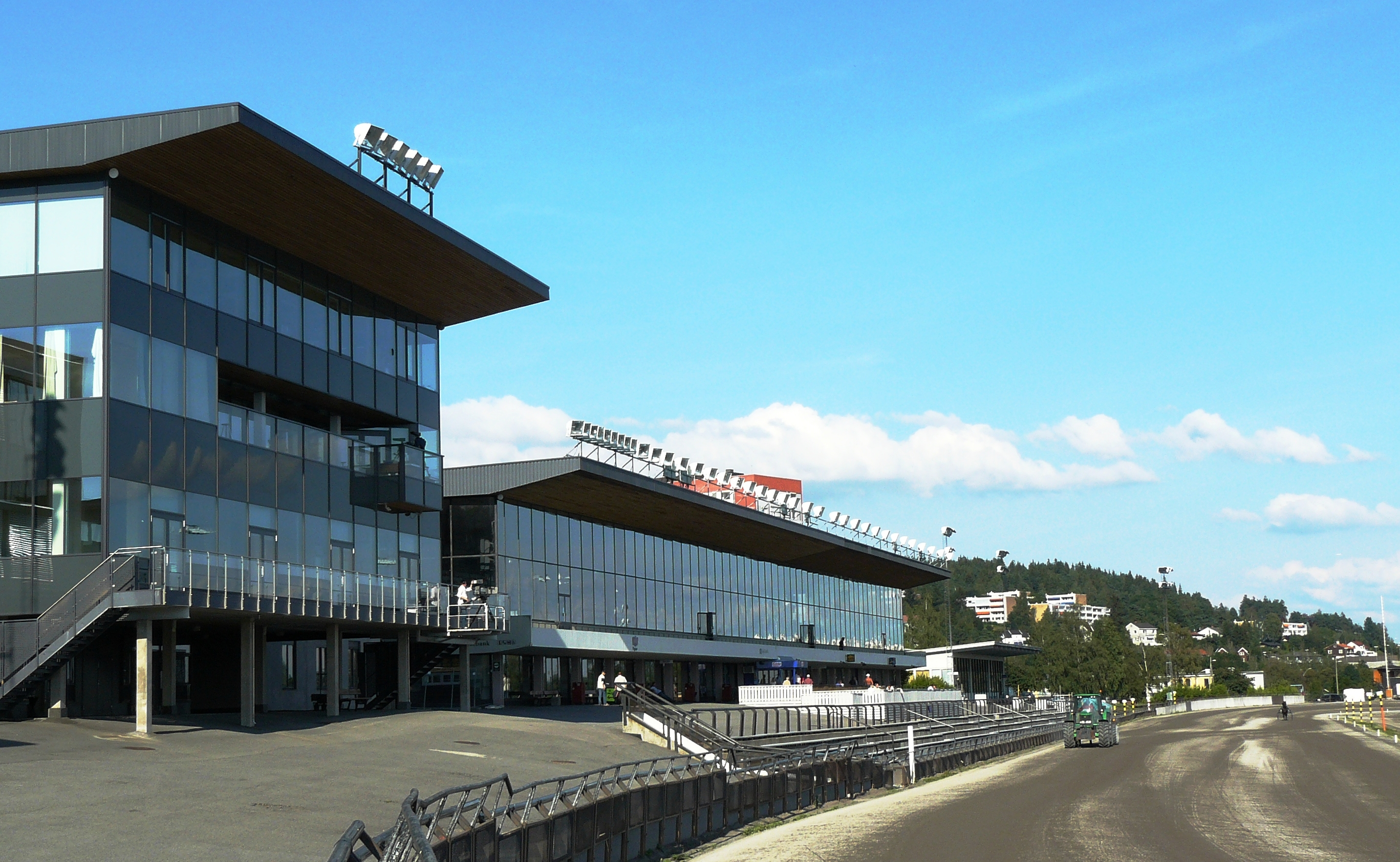
Bjerke Race Track

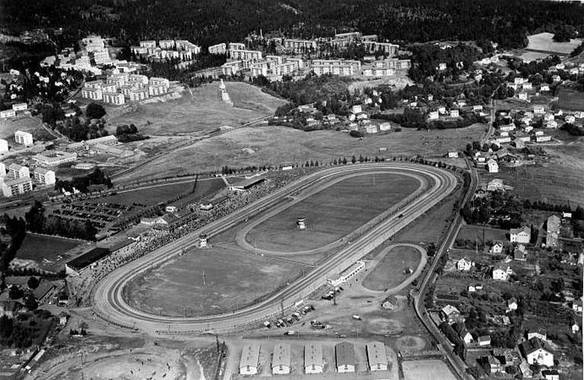
Bjerkebanen in Oslo in 1955. The stables are in the foreground, and Økernveien (Økern Street) lies to the right.

Bjerkebanen, often simply called Bjerke, is a neighborhood in the Økern district of the Bjerke borough in northeastern Oslo, Norway. It lies in the Grorud Valley. The area is dominated by the Bjerke Race Track, a harness racing track (established in 1928), with its stadium building, stable building, and a large parking lot.

The area is bordered by the Refstad neighborhood to the west and Brobekk to the east, and by Risløkka and Vollebekk to the south. The north side is bounded by Norwegian National Road 4 and Trondheimsveien (Trondheim Street), separating the area from the Årvoll neighborhood.

Bjerkebanen mostly consists of residential buildings detached houses, townhouses, and small apartment buildings. Refstadveien (Refstad Street) and Økernveien (Økern Street) are the two largest streets in the area.
