= Norwegian Trotting Association =

Sports federation in Norway

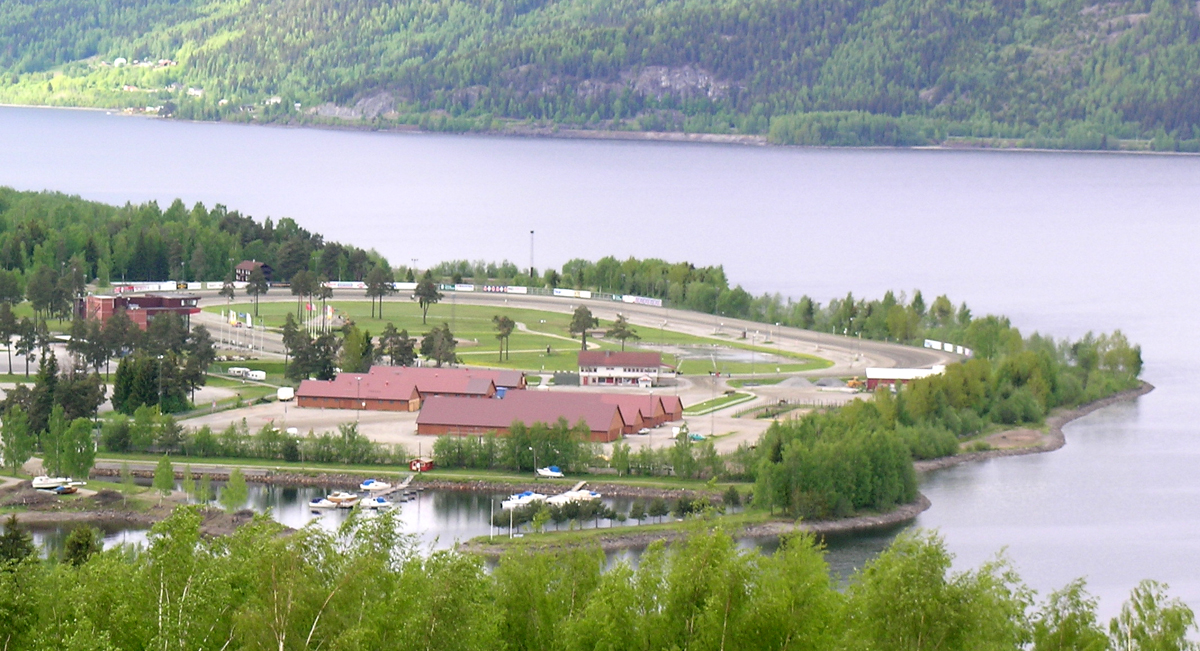
Biri Travbane in Gjøvik

The Norwegian Trotting Association (Norwegian: Det Norske Travselskap, DNT) is the sports federation organizing horse racing in Norway. It is an umbrella for the 13 regional federations and 185 local chapters with 17,000 members. Tote betting takes place at eleven harness race courses and one gallop races course, Øvrevoll Galoppbane, all owned by the association. The betting is organized through the association-owned company Norsk Rikstoto. In 2009 the association organized 556 race days, with 4,652 races taking place in 2008. It organizes 5,500 active racehorses, 200 professional trainers, 60 assistant trainers and 3,000 amateur trainers.

Horse racing in Norway has traditionally taken place on frozen lakes and home from church on Sundays. DNT was established in 1875. In 1928 horse betting was legalized and Bjerke Travbane in Oslo opened. DNT became a founding member of the European Trotting Union in 1973. Norsk Rikstoto was established in 1982 and opened for a national off-track betting. Betting revenue totaled 3.2 billion Norwegian krone in 2008. Races are broadcast on Rikstoto Direkte.

== Courses ==
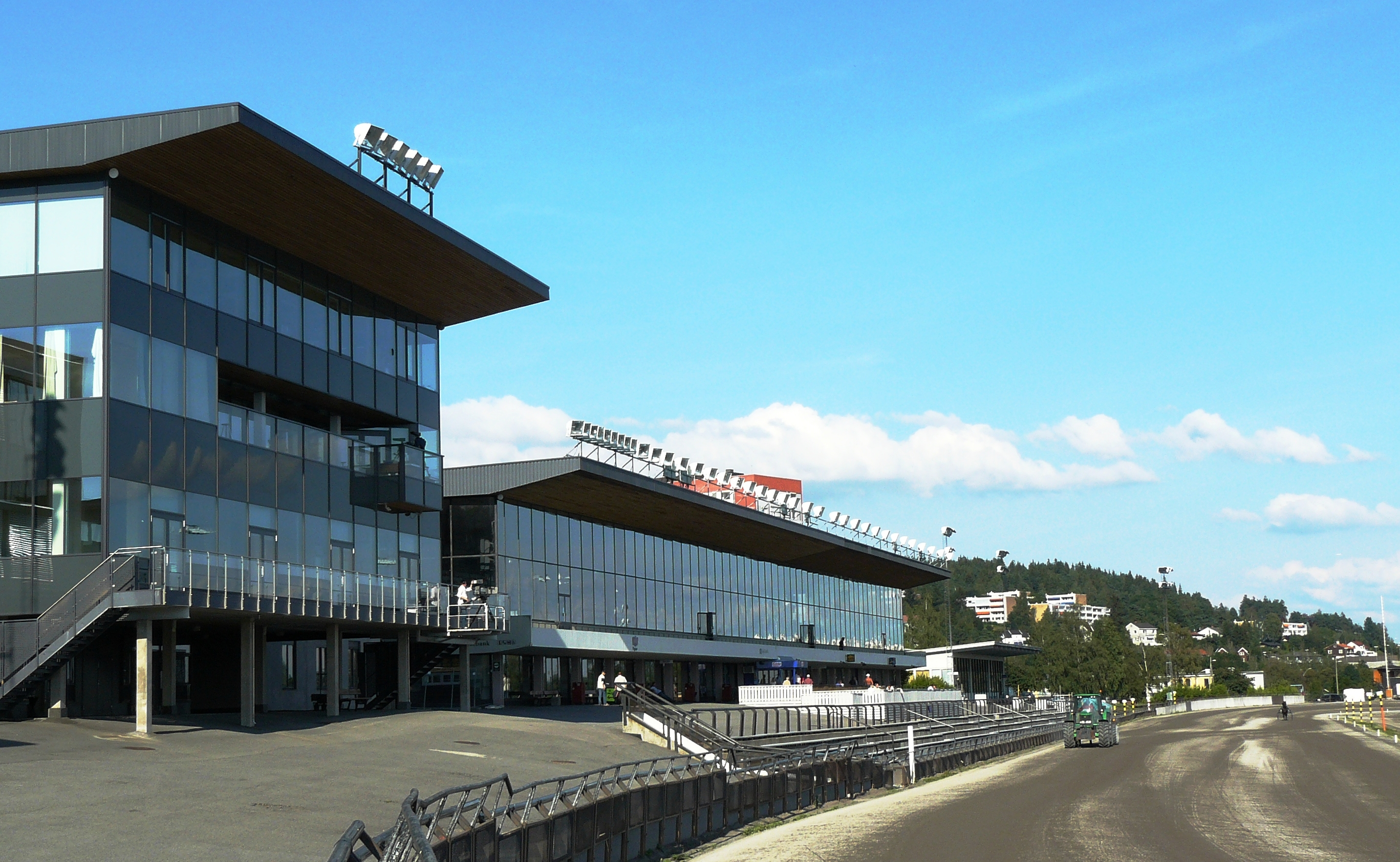
Bjerke Travbane in Oslo

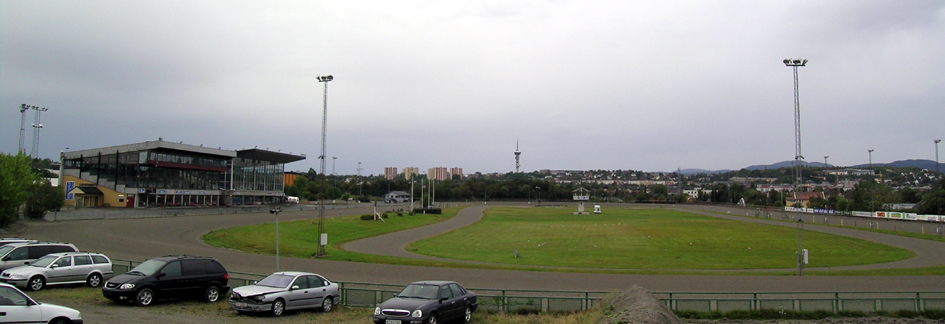
Leangen Travbane in Trondheim

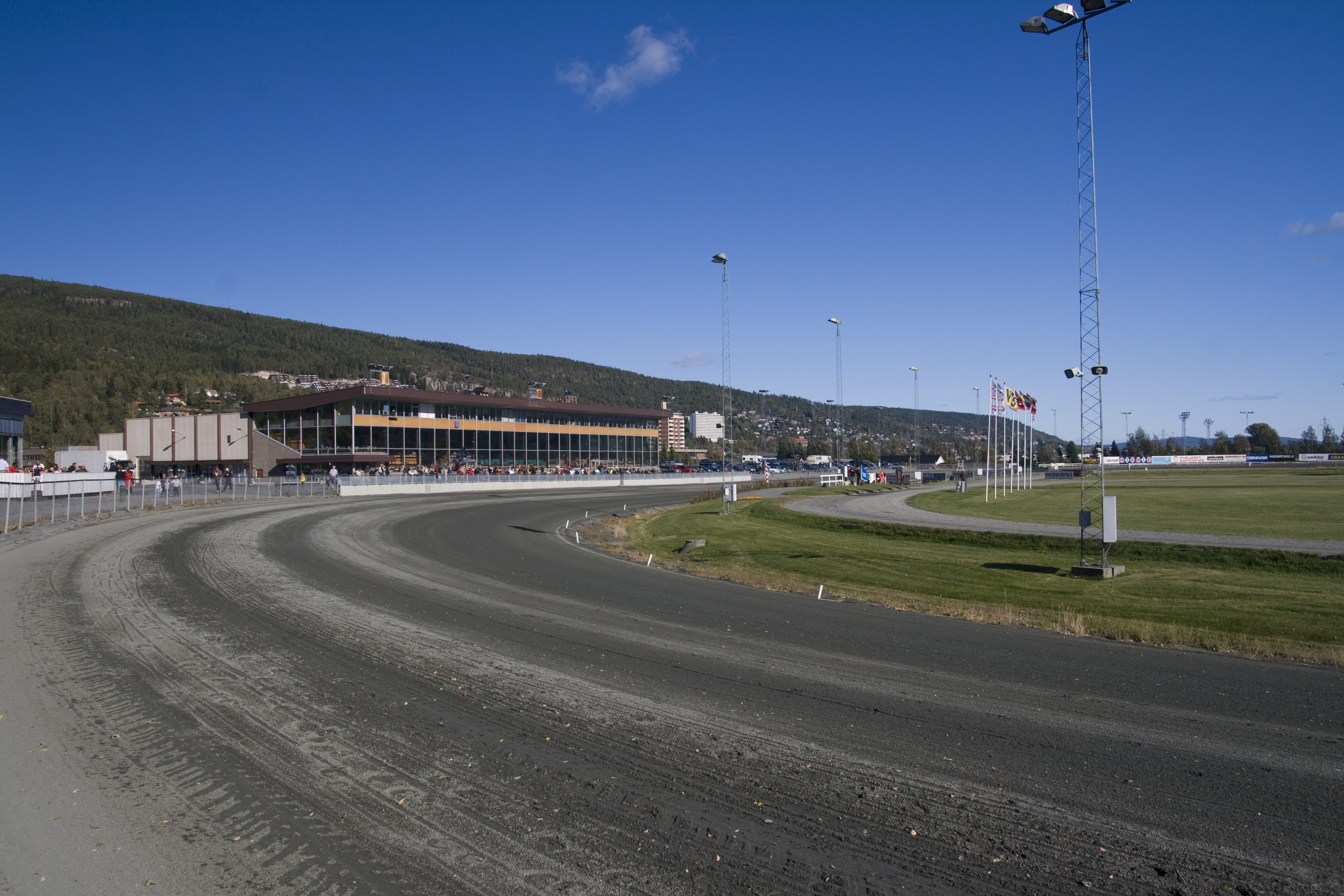
Drammen Travbane

The following is a list of harness racing tracks in Norway which had tote betting races in 2012. Revenue is measured in millions of Norwegian krone.

Race	Municipality	Race days	Revenue
Bjerke	Oslo	115	821
Jarlsberg	Tønsberg	42	286
Leangen	Trondheim	52	281
Bergen	Bergen	48	261
Momarken	Eidsberg	40	255
Biri	Gjøvik	39	248
Forus	Stavanger	41	244
Klosterskogen	Skien	37	187
Drammen	Drammen	42	183
Sørlandet	Kristiansand	34	155
Harstad	Harstad	31	40
Bodø	Bodø	5	2,6
Kongsvinger	Kongsvinger	1	2,0
Nossum	Levanger	1	1,5
Kala	Sarpsborg	1	0,8
Orkdal	Orkanger	2	0,6
Haugaland	Karmøy	1	0,6
Tromsø	Tromsø	2	0,5
Magnor	Eidskog	1	0,5
