= Sverre Seeberg =

Norwegian sports official (born 1950)

Sverre Knutsønn Seeberg (born 3 December 1950) is a Norwegian sports official.

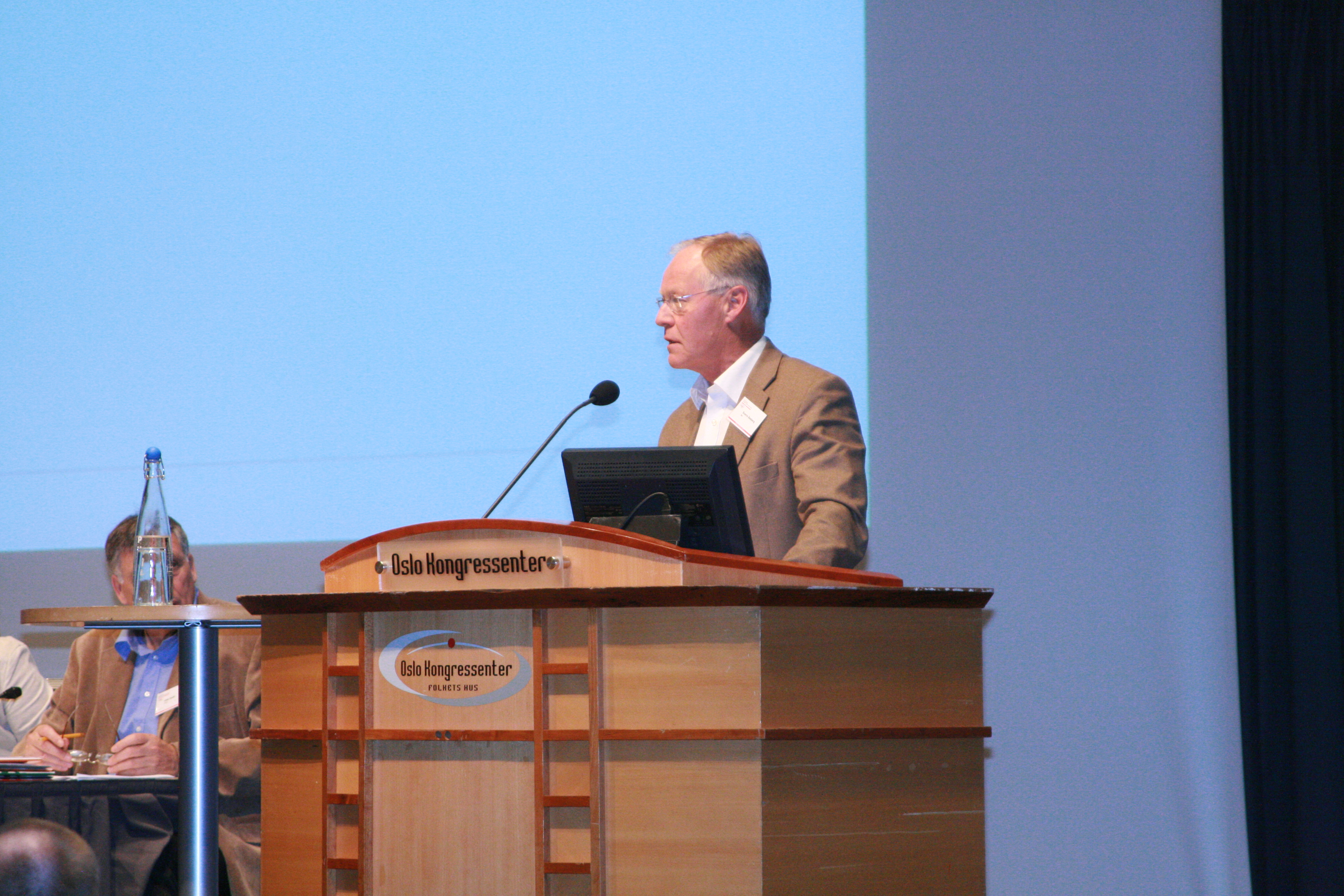

He was an active dog sled racer, being national champion in the sport. He served as president of the Norwegian Sled Dog Racing Association, co-founded the European Sled Dog Racing Association and in 1986 became an honorary member of his local club Holmenkollen Hundekjørerklubb. From 1983 to 1988 he was the secretary-general of the Norwegian Ski Federation. In skiing, he represents the club IL Heming.

Seeberg became president of the Norwegian Ski Federation in 2002 upon Jan Jensen's death, and in 2004 he also became a board member of the International Ski Federation. In 2011 he was rumored to be a candidate as president of the Norwegian Confederation of Sports, but it did not go through. He stepped down from the Norwegian Ski Federation in 2012.

Sporting positions
Preceded by Jan Jensen	President of the Norwegian Ski Federation; 2002–2012	Succeeded by Erik Røste
