= Erik Røste =

Norwegian skiing official (born 1960)

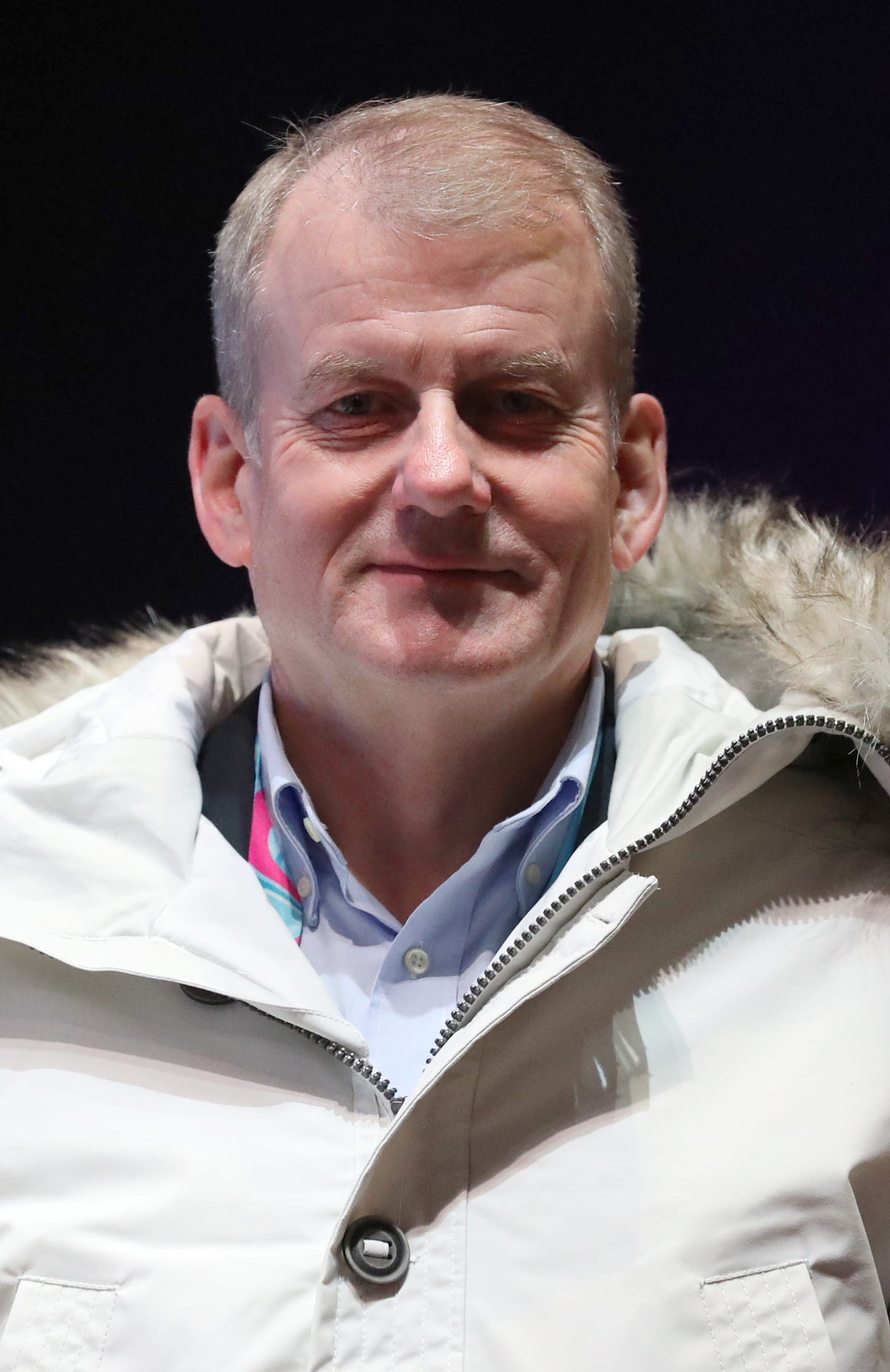
Erik Røste in his function as an IOC member at the 2020 Winter Youth Olympics.

Erik Røste (born 30 April 1960) is a Norwegian skiing coach, official and businessperson.

He was born in Gjøvik and finished his secondary education there in 1979. He took his degree at the Norwegian School of Sport Sciences.

He was hired as a junior and recruit coach in cross-country skiing in the Norwegian Ski Federation in 1990. In 1994, he was promoted to sports director. He left in 1998, but continued as a consultant in Olympiatoppen until 2003.

In 1998 he started a business career in Adidas Norge in Gjøvik. In 2001 he became chief executive of Sport 1 Gruppen. From 2007 to 2008 he had a short tenure in Gjelsten Holding, before becoming chief executive of Bj Sport (Bjørn Dæhlie's clothing brand) in 2008.

In 2008, Røste also became vice president of the Norwegian Ski Federation and the International Ski Federation. In June 2012 he was elected president of the Norwegian Ski Federation.

Sporting positions
| Preceded by Sverre Seeberg | President of the Norwegian Ski Federation; 2012–present | Incumbent |
