= Christiania SK =

Norwegian Nordic skiing club

Christiania Skiklub was a Norwegian Nordic skiing club in Oslo.

It was founded in 1877, and arranged Husebyrennet in 1879 and 1881. In 1883 its members were instrumental in founding the Association for the Promotion of Skiing, which eventually arranged the Holmenkollen Ski Festival. In 1884 the club raised the world's first "ski cabin" at Frønsvollen.
