= Momarken =

Horse racing venue in Norway

Coordinates: 59°34′17″N 11°19′50″E

Momarken, is a racecourse to the north of Mysen, Norway, in the Eidsberg municipality in Østfold. Harness racing at Momarken Travbane and the annual Momarkedet organised by Mysen and the Omegn Red Cross take place there.
