= Rolf Bloch Hansen =

Rolf Bloch Hansen (12 October 1894 – 5 May 1981) was a Norwegian military officer and skiing official.

He was born in Horten as a son of Einar Fredrik Hansen (1867–1946) and Marie Elisabeth Christoffersen (1866–1954). In 1925 he married physician's daughter Ragnfrid Muller (1898-1964).

He finished his secondary education in 1913, graduated from the Norwegian Military Academy in 1916 and the Norwegian Military College in 1919. He was a premier lieutenant from 1916 and captain from 1922. During the occupation of Norway by Nazi Germany he joined Milorg. In June 1942 he was arrested by the authorities for buying food supplies for the resistance. He was incarcerated in Åkebergveien until 31 July 1942, then in Grini concentration camp until 11 June 1943. After the war he became major from 1945 and colonel from 1946. In his military career he reached as far as being inspector-general in the Engineer's Regiment from 1951 to 1959. He then headed the University of Oslo's building office from 1960 to 1970.

He was the secretary of the Association for the Promotion of Skiing from 1945 to 1947, board member from 1945 and deputy chair from 1948 to 1954. From 1928 to 1952 he was among the main organizers of the Holmenkollen ski festival, earning him the nickname "Holmenkollen General". He also chaired the Skiing Committee at the 1952 Winter Olympics.

He was decorated with the Defence Medal 1940–1945 and the King's Medal of Merit in gold and was a Commander of the Order of the Dannebrog.

Sporting positions
Preceded by Georg F. V. Krogh (secretary); Hans L'orange (manager)	Secretary of the Association for the Promotion of Skiing; 1927–1945	Succeeded by Jakob Vaage
