= Rolf Willy Hansen =

Norwegian diplomat

- Born: April 17, 1949
- Education: cand.philol.
- Occupation: Diplomat
- Employer: Ministry of Foreign Affairs (Norway)

Rolf Hansen is a Norwegian diplomat.

He started working for the Norwegian Ministry of Foreign Affairs in 1975. From 1993 to 1994 he was a sub-director in the Ministry of Foreign Affairs, and then spent three years as an adviser. From 1997 to 2000 he served as consul-general in Hong Kong. After being head of department in the Ministry of Foreign Affairs from 2001 to 2005, he was consul-general in Minneapolis from 2005 to 2008. He was Norway´s ambassador to Syria from 2008 to 2012 and ambassador to Saudi Arabia from 2014 to 2017.
