= Alf Scott-Hansen Sr. =

Norwegian engineer and civil servant

Alf Scott-Hansen (10 November 1870 – 16 September 1936) was a Norwegian engineer and civil servant.

== Personal life ==
He was born in Leith, Scotland as a son of priest in the Norwegian Church Abroad (Sjømannskirken), Andreas Michael Hansen (1834–1901) and Simonine Stephansen (1840–1925). He was a brother of Commander Sigurd Scott-Hansen. He was a first cousin of Sam Eyde on the maternal side.

In 1898 he married consul's daughter Lalla Wiborg (1869-1953). They had the son Alf Scott-Hansen (1903–1961), a film director who was once married to actress and singer, Wenche Foss (1917-2011).

== Career ==
He finished his secondary education in 1888, and graduated from the Dresden University of Technology in 1903. Before graduating he had been hired in the Norwegian Public Roads Administration in 1893, State Port Authority (Statens Havnevesen) later in 1893, then Sam Eyde's company Gleim & Eyde in 1897 before he became subdirector in Norges Oplysningskontor for Næringsveiene in 1902. From 1903 to 1905 he was also the vice president of the Norwegian Polytechnic Society.

Scott-Hansen was an executive in Norsk Hydro from its start in 1905 until 1920. Here he re-joined Sam Eyde, who served as director-general, the highest executive in Norsk Hydro. After leaving the company, Scott-Hansen was the chief executive of Store Norsk-Franske Kolonikompani for one year, then chief engineer in Statens Havnevesen from 1922 and director from 1925.

He chaired the supervisory council of Elektrokemisk and was a supervisory council member of Norsk Hydro, De-No-Fa, Arendals Fossekompani, Arendals Smelteverk and Holmenkolbanen. He was a board member of Frydenlunds Bryggeri, Norges Varemesse, Eksportnæringenes Landsforbund, the Federation of Norwegian Industries and Ingeniørenes Hus, and a construction committee member during the 1914 Jubilee Exhibition in Kristiania.

Scott-Hansen was admitted into the exclusive skiing club SK Ull in 1893. He served as deputy chairman from 1912 to 1916, and chairman from 1917 to 1928. He was decorated as a Knight, Second Class of the House and Merit Order of Peter Frederick Louis. He died in September 1936.
