= Jørgen Tandberg =

Norwegian bishop and politician (1816–1884)

Right Reverend Jørgen Johan Tandberg
- Bishop of Kristianssand
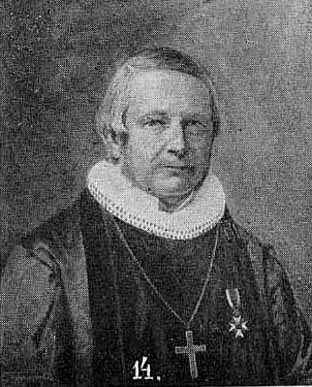
- Church: Church of Norway
- Diocese: Diocese of Kristianssand
- Appointed: 1882
- In office: 1882–1884

Personal details
- Born: 3 June 1816 Tønsberg, Norway
- Died: 17 April 1884 (aged 67) Kristiansand, Norway
- Buried: Vår Frelsers gravlund, Oslo
- Denomination: Christian
- Occupation: Priest

Jørgen Johan Tandberg (3 June 1816–17 April 1884) was a Norwegian politician and priest. He served in the Parliament of Norway for one term and he also served as a bishop in the Church of Norway.

== Biography ==
He was born in Tønsberg, Norway on 3 June 1816. He finished his secondary education in 1833 and graduated with the cand.theol. degree in 1838. He was a teacher in Christiania at the Christiania Borgerskole from 1840 until 1843. He then became a school headmaster in Fredrikshald at the Fredrikshald Borgerskole. In 1848, he moved to Moss to be the headmaster at the Borgerskole in Moss. Later that same year, he was appointed as a curate in Hougs Municipality, a parish in the Diocese of Bergen. He was elected to the Parliament of Norway in 1857, representing the constituency of Søndre Bergenhus Amt for two years.

In the summer of 1858, he was appointed as "third priest" in the Trinity Church, a large congregation in Kristiania. In the fall of 1866, he became a curate (assistant priest) in the Church of Our Saviour, the main cathedral for the capital city of Norway. He was promoted to vicar there in 1872, and since that church was the cathedral for the diocese, he also held the title of dean of the Diocese of Kristiania. In February 1882, he was appointed to be the bishop of the Diocese of Kristianssand, based at the Kristiansand Cathedral. He was ordained as bishop on May 18 of that year. He held this post until his death on 17 April 1884. He is buried in the Vår Frelsers gravlund cemetery in Oslo.

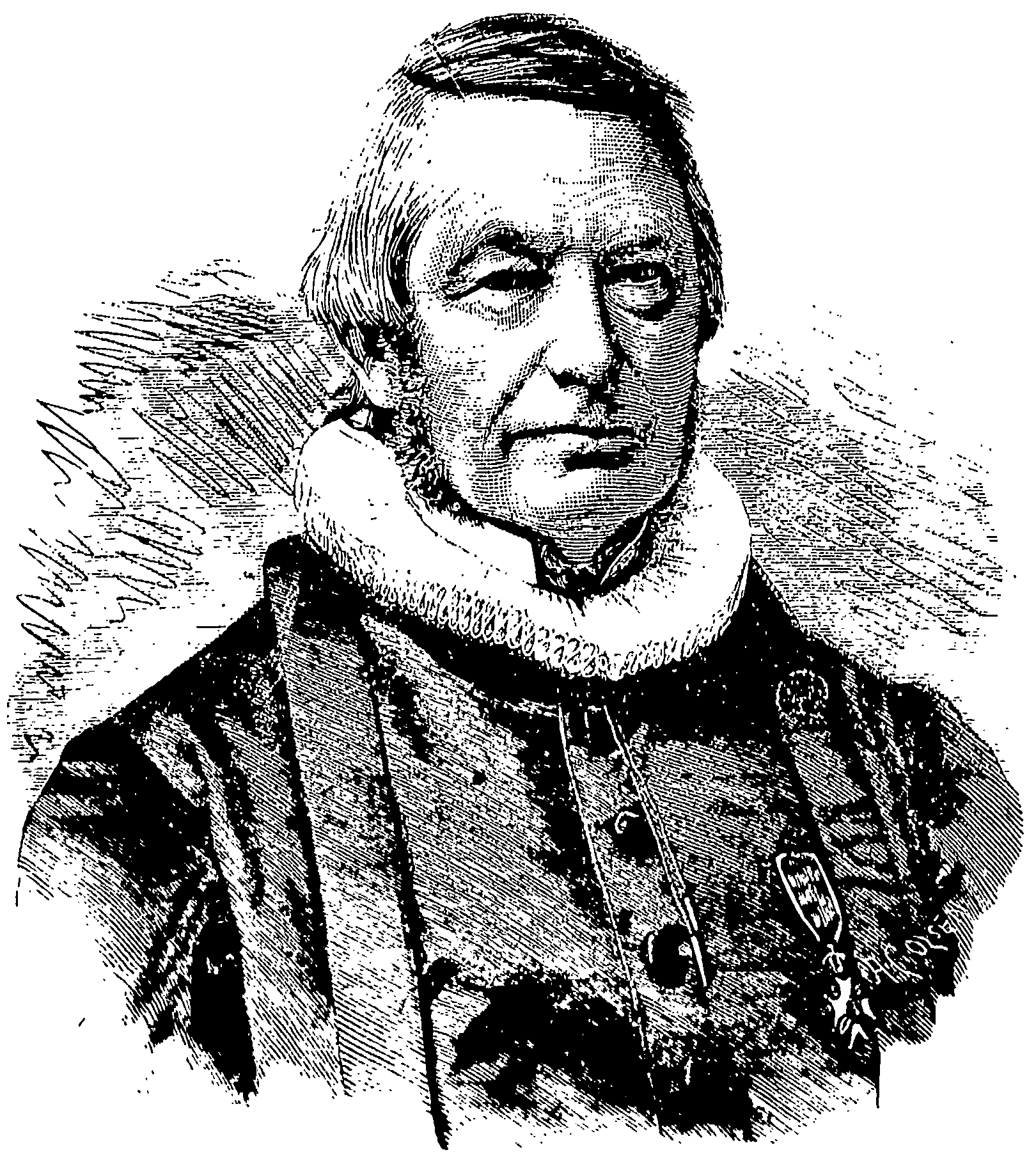
Picture, Verdens Gang 6 December 1884.

== Personal life ==
Tandberg was born in 1816 to the priest Johan Christian Tandberg and his first wife Andrea Heyerdahl Lyche. He was married to Marie Theodora Frølich on 28 October 1847 in Fredrikshald in Østfold county, Norway. Together, they had 11 children between 1848 and 1870. Tandberg's son Jens Frølich Tandberg (1852–1922) was the Bishop of the Diocese of Oslo from 1912 to 1922.

Religious titles
Preceded by Jørgen Moe	Bishop of Christianssand; 1882–1884	Succeeded by Jacob Sverdrup Smitt
