= Husebyrennet =

Annual ski jumping competition in Ullern, Oslo, Norway

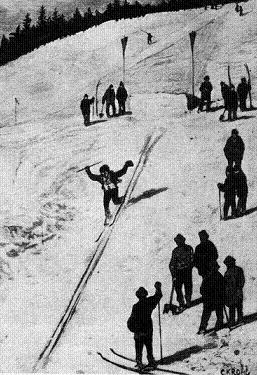
- Drawing by Christian Krohg depicting the first Husebyrennet in 1879.
- Status: relocated
- Genre: sports event
- Date: early during the year
- Frequency: annual
- Locations: Ullern, Norway
- Inaugurated: 1879
- Most recent: 1891

Husebyrennet was a ski jumping competition which was held in Ullern, Oslo, Norway. These yearly competitions, held from 1879 to 1891, were a precursor to the Holmenkollen event. Starting in January 1892, this competition relocated to the Holmenkollbakken in Holmenkollen.

The first competitions held by Christiania SK were different from today's ski jumping in that the ski jump formed part of a course that included a 4 km stretch of cross-country skiing (see Nordic combined). No jump lengths were measured. Instead, judges gave points for style, on a scale from 1 to 5.

The ski jump, called Kastellbakken, was viewed as gigantic for its time, with length around 20 meters readily achieved. At the first recognized competition held in Husebybakken in 1879, Olaf Haugann of Norway set the first world record for the longest ski jump at 20 meters.

In the first years, Sondre Norheim was dominating. Later, the brothers Mikkjel and Torjus Hemmestveit were dominant. In 1883, Fridtjof Nansen participated, and was a main attraction, having then won fame by finishing the distance Bergen to Oslo on skis. The event became very popular, with up to 10,000 spectators. King Oscar II and Prince Hans of Denmark were among the spectators.

Due to lack of snow, the event was not held in 1880, and in 1890 it was held elsewhere. This uncertainty relating to the conditions led to the competition being moved permanently to the location of what is now Holmenkollbakken in 1892. Today, only a bronze plaque serves as a reminder of the events.
