= Norwegian Ski Federation =

Skiing governing body in Norway

- Norges Skiforbund
- Formation: 21 February 1908
- Type: sports governing body
- Headquarters: Oslo
- Location: Norway
- Members: 123,000 (2021)
- President: Roger Finjord
- Affiliations: International Ski and Snowboard Federation (FIS)
- Website: skiforbundet.no

The Norwegian Ski Federation (Norwegian: Norges Skiforbund) is headquartered in Oslo, Norway and is the national representative of the International Ski and Snowboard Federation.

Founded on 21 February 1908, it covers the skiing disciplines of alpine, cross-country, freestyle, Nordic combined, ski jumping, and snowboarding. The organization is also involved in the promotion of skiing in Norway, cooperating with the Association for the Promotion of Skiing.

The current president is Roger Finjord, and vice president is Aage Schaanning.

== See also ==
- Norway national alpine ski team
