= Norsk Rikstoto =

Norwegian foundation that supervises bets on animal racing

- Formation: 24 September 1982
- Founder: Norwegian Trotting Association; Norwegian Jockey Club
- Legal status: Foundation
- Purpose: Standards
- Headquarters: Bjerke, Oslo, Norway
- Region served: Norway
- CEO: Camilla Garmann
- Board of directors: Erik Røste (chairman)
- Website: Official website

The Norsk Rikstoto (lit. 'Norwegian National Tote') is a foundation that supervises parimutuel betting on animal racing in Norway.

It was established on 24 September 1982 by the Norwegian Trotting Association and the Norwegian Jockey Club to run a totalizator game named V6. Norsk Tipping administered most such games until 1993, when Norsk Rikstoto took over. In 1996 the foundation received responsibility, financial and administrative, for all such games. It also runs the television channel Rikstoto Direkte.

Animal racing in Norway is limited to equine racing; there are eleven tracks for harness racing and one track, Øvrevoll Galoppbane, for gallop. The state provides a legal framework, but claims 3.7% of Norsk Rikstoto's gross annual turnover in fees.

Chairman of the board is Erik Røste, and CEO is Camilla Garmann. The organizational headquarters are at Bjerke, Oslo.
