= Association for the Promotion of Skiing =

Norwegian skiing organization

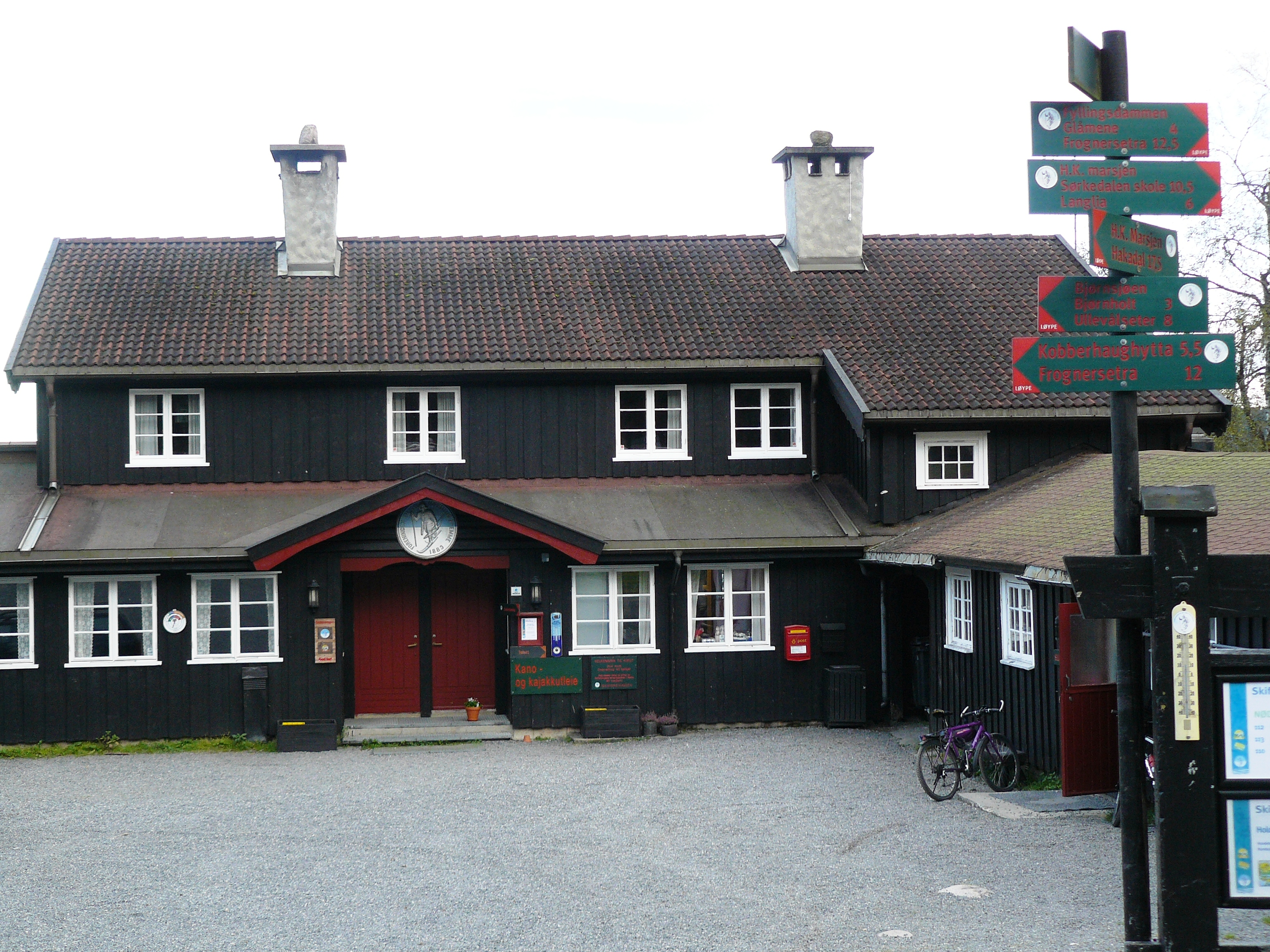
Skiforeningen's hut, Kikutstua in Oslomarka

The Association for the Promotion of Skiing (Norwegian: Foreningen til Ski-idrettens Fremme, or Skiforeningen) is a large association in Norway promoting Nordic skiing and other outdoor recreational activities.

Skiforeningen was founded in 1883 and has about 70 000 members. It maintains several thousand kilometers of cross country ski trails in Oslomarka and holds several events at Holmenkollen.
