= Tote betting =

Betting organization

The Tote
- Industry: Gambling
- Founded: 1928
- Headquarters: Wigan, England
- Key people: John Williamson (Chairman); Alex Frost (Chief Executive Officer)
- Products: Pool betting, sports betting, online casino
- Owner: UK Tote Group
- Website: www.tote.co.uk

The Tote is a British gambling company founded in 1928. It operates the world’s largest online pool betting website. Its product offering also includes sports betting and online casino. Business operations are led from its headquarters in Wigan.

The Tote was established and owned by the UK Government until July 2011 when it was sold to Betfred for £265m. It was sold to UK Tote Group - a consortium of over 150 individual investors involved in the sport as racehorse owners and breeders - in October 2019 for £115m. The Tote has retail outlets on 58 of the UK's 59 racecourses, as well as an online division.

Under the ownership of the UK Tote Group, the Tote aims to develop a more competitive product to compete in the UK betting market.

== Terminology ==
As other bookmakers can offer similar gambling services it is necessary to disambiguate the bets. A bookmaker win-only bet (on-the-nose) isn't the same as a Tote Win bet, as the bookmaker is offering fixed odds for that particular outcome, while the Tote is a dividend paid out from the betting pool. The betting pool is generated from individuals placing money on a Tote bet.

A price quote for a horse on the Tote is the current dividend payout on the event of that outcome happening. This tends to be similar to normal bookmaker odds, and tracks the market in a similar way, but at any given time may be better or worse than a bookmaker's quoted odds. However, since all bets are pooled, all bets are essentially "starting price" (SP), that is, until the race has started (and all betting finished) one cannot calculate what the final payout will be; whereas bookmakers can offer either SP or a "board price", that is, a guaranteed payout at a given price for a winning bet. (The SP for horse races is the average price offered by bookmakers when the race starts, as inspected by employees of the Jockey Club).

In 2020 the Tote launched Tote Guarantee ensuring Tote win bets will never pay out less than the SP.

== Tote Win ==
The minimum stake for this bet is £2. One selects a horse from the field. This can be on any horse at any race meeting. The betting slip can be denoted with the horse's race card number, or the horses name (and if at another course, the name of the course), or it can be marked as the 'favourite', where the horse is not nominated but the bet is placed on whichever horse is favourite (has the largest amount of money put into the pool) at the start of the race. This will, obviously, have the lowest payout (since the pool will be shared with the largest number of winners) but the assumption is that if others have bet on it, it must have a good chance of winning.

== Tote Place ==
A Tote Place bet is still on one, but the horse may come second, third or even fourth for the bet to win. Not every race qualifies for this type of bet. There must be a minimum of 5 horses in the field, the minimum stake is £2 and the following rules apply:

Number of runners	Dividend places
Up to 4 runners	Unavailable
5, 6 or 7 runners	1–2
8–15 runners in handicaps 8+ runners in non-handicaps	1–2 – 3
16+ runners handicaps	1–2 – 3 – 4

== Each-Way ==
It is also possible to have an each-way ("e/w") bet, which is simply a combination of a Tote Win with a Tote Place bet. A £1 e/w bet is a total of £2, £1 for the Tote Win and the other £1 is for the Tote Place, and the money is split between the two separate pools (the Win pool and the Place pool).

Bookmakers other than the Tote do not generally offer a place-only bet, but only an each-way bet. This can be seen as a waste by bettors who believe their selection will finish 2nd or 3rd but will not come 1st; since half the money falls on the "win" it is wasted. A non-Tote bookmaker will offer a quarter or a fifth for the e/w component, whereas the Tote place payout, and as such the e/w payout, is as always the betting pool dividend. With the advent of the exchanges, more and more bookmakers are beginning to offer 'place only' markets in an attempt to rival the exchanges. However, there is not a set in stone way for a punter to calculate the place odds as there is with an each-way bet, and the special place only odds offered by bookmakers can vary quite a bit, both bigger and smaller, from the place odds you would receive if betting each-way. This is particularly true in "bad each-way" races, where the place odds are much less generous than if you bet each-way. The upside to this however goes back to what was said above; since the punter does not have to "waste" half their stake on the win part of the bet.

== Tote Exacta ==
The Tote Exacta operates in the same way as a normal bookmaker's straight forecast. As always the Tote price for the forecast is always based on the betting pool dividend. A forecast is to predict the correct order of the horses finishing first and second. The minimum bet is £2 and the multiples of 10 pence over this, multiples can also be used to reach the initial minimum of £2. If the bet contains a non-runner the bet becomes void and unnamed favourites are not allowed.

There are three Exacta bets:

Single Exacta (straight forecast). Pick in the correct order the horses which will finish first and second.

Combination Exacta (reverse forecast). Pick in either order the horses which will finish first and second. This bet is actually two bets in one, it is exactly equivalent to two straight forecasts, the first of which you select horse A to beat horse B, and then the second is for horse B to beat horse A. It's possible to specify more than two horses, at which point the bet becomes more complex, for example with three horses the individual bets are now a-b, a-c, b-a, b-c, c-a, c-b.

Banker Exacta (banker forecast). Pick a horse which you think is going to finish first, and then any number of horses to finish second. For instances, with a banker horse a, and with three additional horses, the bets are a-b, a-c, a-d.

Bookmakers that are not Tote-syndicated will offer their own forecast prices based on their own odds that they are quoting. However bookmakers will normally allow you to place a 'Tote forecast' and will pay out whatever the Tote dividend payout was.

== Tote Trifecta ==
Also known as a Trifecta: pick the first three horses in the right order. This is generally really difficult to do and the dividend for getting it right is correspondingly better. The Tote can nominate races containing more than 8 runners as Trifecta races. There are three types of Trifecta, the Single, Combination and Banker and they work the same way as Exacta bets, only with three horses instead of two. The minimum stake is £2.

== Tote Quadpot ==
A Quadpot is operated at every meeting in the UK and it takes place on the third to sixth races on the card. The aim is to pick a horse that will be placed in each one of these races, according to the placing rules stated in the Tote Place section above. The minimum bet is 10p. The dividend is declared after the result of the last race is known and thus the betting pool divided by the remaining stakes which are left. One may select the favourite instead of naming a specific horse.

== Tote Placepot ==
The Placepot is identical to the Quadpot, but it covers the first six races of a chosen meeting. Most UK race meetings have six races as a minimum, occasionally seven and rarely eight, but the Placepot is always operated on the first six. This bet is especially popular because it gives punters a stake in most - if not all - of the day's racing. The minimum stake is 5p, making it accessible for casual and serious bettors alike. Here is a worked example:

Race	Selection 1	Selection 2	Selection 3	Selection 4
One	2	7		
Two	F			
Three	F	11		
Four	4			
Five	6			
Six	F	1	3	

The first race the gambler has opted to choose two horses. Maybe the gambler isn't confident of his abilities or maybe it is a large field and the gambler feels unable to just place one horse. On race two the gambler has elected to roll with the favourite, whatever it may be. In the final race the gambler has chosen three selections. This is often driven by the motive that if the gambler reaches the last race and still has a bet on, he doesn't want to lose out in the last race by only having one selection. The number of combinations in this bet is therefore 2 × 1 × 2 × 1 × 1 × 3 = 12. The gambler has decided to risk 20p per bet, so the total cost of this bet is £2.40.

If after the first race the gambler has failed to pick a selection which was placed then the bet is over. If a selection is placed, then the bet continues, and the winnings are transferred as the stake on the second race. In this example, horse 2 may be placed and horse 7 unplaced, which means the bet continues – but there are now only 6 valid combinations for winning left.

If the gambler is lucky and managed to get through to the end, then the Tote will calculate the dividend for a £1 unit stake. In this example the Tote is going to declare the dividend as £30, and the lucky gambler has 2 winning combinations. Two combinations at a stake level of 20p is 40p, so 40% of £30 is £12, a profit of £9.60.

If a favourite is placed in every single race the Placepot payout is typically as low as it can get, and it could be anywhere from £3 to £15, although anything less than £6–£7 is quite unusual. If favourites fail to finish in the places for half of the races then something around the £40–£200 could be anticipated, placepots of over £25,000 have been known but they are extremely uncommon. However, there isn't a science to guessing what the placepot might be, the placepot dividend is the calculation of the number of tickets left divided by the pool money.

There are a couple of additional rules which affect the operation of the Placepot (and indeed the Quadpot/Jackpot/Scoop6). If a selection becomes a non-runner it will be replaced by the Starting Price favourite. Where there are joint favourites and the gambler has selected to roll on the Favourite, then the horse with the lowest race card number will be taken. If the favourite withdraws (for instance, the horse refuses to enter its starting gate) and the market has no time to select a new favourite the horse with the next shortest odds will become the favourite. It's rare for a race card to progress without a couple of non-runners so a gambler will be affected by these rules from time to time.

== Tote Jackpot ==
The Tote Jackpot is a bet where you have to pick the first 6 winners at a meeting nominated by The Tote. The bet is available every day of the week excluding Saturday. The minimum stake is £1 and multiples are in multiples of 50p. Typically the payouts are very good for the Jackpot as it is very difficult to pick six winners in a row. The betting pool will roll into the next Jackpot event if there is no dividend to pay.

== Tote Scoop6 ==
Similar to the Tote Jackpot, Tote Scoop6 is run on Saturdays and occasionally on other days such as Boxing Day, and has been branded this way for television audiences, generally Scoop6 races are shown on terrestrial television in the UK. The stake for one line is £2, as opposed to a minimum 50p in the case of the Jackpot. As the pool will roll-over in the event of there being no dividends to pay the pool can become very large and wins in excess of £500,000 have been known. There is also a bonus fund whereby the winner of a Scoop6 event can attempt to pick the winner of the most difficult race in next week's Scoop6. This bet is also a Placepot bet, as the Tote also payout a dividend for selecting a horse to be placed in each race. According to the Tote, the average dividend is over £500 for a winning place line.

There is a major operational difference to this bet as compared to the Jackpot/Placepot/Quadpot: the six races on the Scoop6 card are nominated by the Tote from any of the race meetings on that day, typically the Scoop6 card will have a number of very difficult races such as handicap races with over 20 horses running, and races with 2- or 3-year-olds where many horses have no track record, making it difficult to select a winner. It is also the reason why the placepot payouts are correspondingly higher than a normal placepot as well. The televised coverage usually announces how many Scoop6 tickets are left after each Scoop6 race, and it is quite common to be left with only three or four tickets after the first four races.

As with other Tote bets, non-syndicated bookmakers will normally accept a Tote bet and pay out in line with the Tote dividend.

== Toteswinger ==
This is a single-race exotic bet available on all races of six or more runners at every meeting, every day, players have to pick two horses to finish 1st, 2nd or 3rd in any order.

Each bet offers three chances to win as follows:

- Picking the horses that finish first and second in any order
- Picking the horses that finish first and third in any order
- Picking the horses that finish second and third in any order

A different dividend is declared for each outcome.

The minimum unit stake for a toteswinger bet is 10p (shops and online). Minimum unit stake on-course is 50p with minimum total spend £2 as per all totepool on-course bets. Toteswinger is unique to the tote; there is no other equivalent fixed odds or SP bet.

This is an extremely popular bet in overseas racing markets, particularly South Africa where it accounts for 40% of pool turnover.

== See also ==
- Tote Ireland
- Sports betting
- Arbitrage betting
- Sports betting systems
