= Schønheyder =

Schønheyder is a surname. Notable people with the surname include:

- Anna Schønheyder (1877–1927), Norwegian painter and textile artist
- Johan Chr. Schønheyder (1915–2015), Norwegian insurance manager, orienteer and sports official
- Johan Christian Schønheyder (1742–1803), Danish-Norwegian priest
- Johan Franciscus Schønheyder (1879–1968), Norwegian ships engineer
- Johan Martin Schønheyder (1752–1828), Danish lawyer
- Rolf Schønheyder (1913–1994), Norwegian sprinter
- Ulrich Anton Schønheyder (1775–1858), Danish naval officer
- Valdemar Schønheyder Møller (1764–1905), Danish painter
