= Johan Sverre =

Johan Sverre may refer to:

- Johan Sverre (actor) (1923–1990), Norwegian actor
- Johan Sverre (sports official) (1867–1934), Norwegian sports official

== See also ==
- Sverre
