= Strugstad =

Strugstad is a Norwegian surname.

== Notable people ==
Notable people with this surname include:

- Oscar Sigvald Julius Strugstad (1851–1919), Norwegian military officer and politician
- Oscar Sigvald Strugstad (1887–1953), Norwegian military officer
