= Fritjof Heyerdahl =

Norwegian engineer and industrial leader

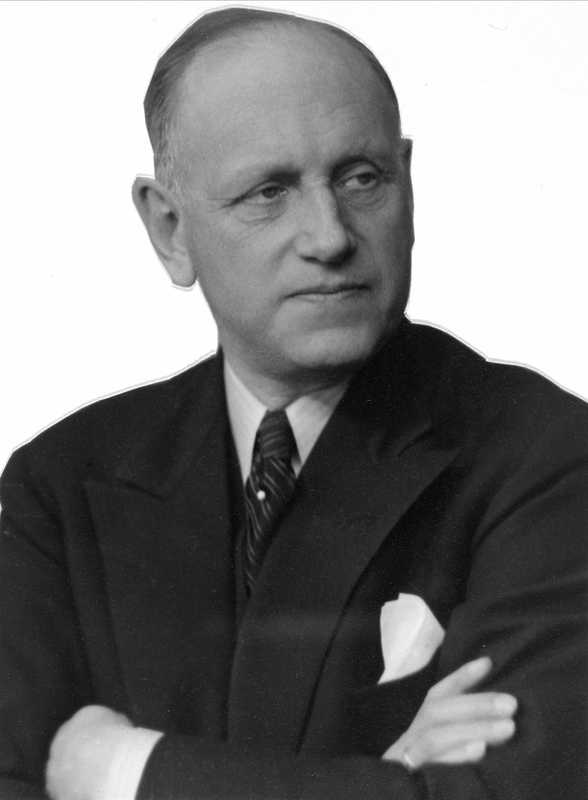
- Heyerdahl c. 1935
- Born: 4 June 1879; Christiania, Norway
- Died: 27 September 1970 (aged 91)
- Occupation: Engineer
- Relatives: Oscar Sigvald Julius Strugstad (father-in-law); Oscar Sigvald Strugstad (brother-in-law)

Fritjof Heyerdahl (4 June 1879 – 27 September 1970) was a Norwegian engineer and industrial leader.

He was born in Christiania to engineer Halvor Emil Heyerdahl and Alma Hedrich, and was married to Borghild Strugstad, daughter of Oscar Sigvald Julius Strugstad and sister of Oscar Sigvald Strugstad. He was director of Norsk A/S Siemens Schuckert from 1914 to 1945, and held several positions in engineering organizations. He served as President of the Norwegian Red Cross from 1940 to 1945, and was named honorary member of the organization from 1949.
