= Carl Sylow =

Norwegian military officer and sports official

- Born: 26 January 1838; Christiania, Norway
- Died: 12 December 1930 (aged 92)
- Occupations: Military officer Sports official
- Parent: Thomas Edvard von Westen Sylow
- Relatives: Peter Ludwig Mejdell Sylow (brother)
- Awards: Order of St. Olav; Order of the Sword

Carl Christian Weinwich Sylow (26 January 1838 – 12 December 1930) was a Norwegian military officer and sports official.

Sylow was born in Christiania to government minister Thomas Edvard von Westen Sylow and Magdalene Mejdell, and was a brother of mathematician Peter Ludwig Mejdell Sylow. He graduated as military officer in 1861 and from the Norwegian Military College in 1867, and was promoted Colonel in 1894. From 1892 to 1902 he chaired the sports association Centralforeningen for Idræt. He was also president of the Norwegian Gymnastics Federation from 1895 to 1899. He was decorated Knight of the Order of St. Olav in 1895, and was a Knight, First Class of the Order of the Sword.

Sporting positions
Preceded by Anders Løwlie	Chairman of Centralforeningen; 1892–1902	Succeeded by Thorvald Prydz
