= Axel Proet Høst =

Norwegian sports official

- Born: 16 April 1907; Horten, Norway
- Died: 19 October 1985 (aged 78); Oslo, Norway
- Education: Jurisprudence
- Occupation: Lawyer
- Awards: King's Medal of Merit in gold Defence Medal 1940–1945 with rosette Legion of Merit

Axel Proet Høst (16 April 1907 – 19 October 1985) was a Norwegian lawyer and sports executive.

== Personal life and education ==
Proet Høst was born in Horten on 16 April 1907, to Iens Ludvig Høst and Caroline Proet. He finished his secondary education in 1926 and graduated from the Royal Frederick University as cand.jur. in 1930, and married Øivor Grethe Johansen in 1936.

== Career ==
He was president of the Norwegian Boxing Association from 1938 to 1949. In September 1940, during the German occupation of Norway, steps were taken to merge the two sports confederations, Norges Landsforbund for Idræt, and Arbeidernes Idrettsforbund. The agreement was signed on 13 September, and an interim board for the merged organization was formed. Proet Høst was a member of the interim board, which was led by Olaf Helset (chair) and Rolf Hofmo (vice chair).

After the Second World War, most of the boxing equipment in Norway was gone, and one of Proet Høst's first tasks was to order boxing gloves from the United Kingdom and the United States. In 1946 he entered the Norwegian Confederation of Sports board as well as the Norwegian Olympic Committee. He was vice president of the Norwegian Confederation of Sports from 1950 to 1959 and president from 1961 to 1965, when he was succeeded by Johan Chr. Schønheyder. Among others, Proet Høst led the Norwegian delegation to the 1964 Summer Olympics. He was a believer in amateurism in sports, stating that professional boxing "has nothing to do with sport".

He worked as a barrister in his hometown Horten, serving for many years as a defender. During World War II, he was a leader of the local resistance to the Nazi occupation, then narrowly escaped to Britain to continue the fight, while the authorities imprisoned his wife. She was imprisoned at Møllergata 19 from 17 March to 22 May 1944. He returned to Norway via airplane to Stavanger on 10 May 1945.

== Awards and recognitions ==
His decorations include the Norwegian King's Medal of Merit in gold, the Defence Medal 1940–1945 with rosette, and the American Legion of Merit.

== Death ==
Proet Høst died in Oslo on 19 October 1985, at the age of 78.

Sporting positions
Preceded by Arthur Ruud	Chairman of the Norwegian Confederation of Sports; 1961–1965	Succeeded by Johan Chr. Schønheyder
