= Sverre =

Sverre, Sverrir or Sverri is a Nordic name from the Old Norse Sverrir, meaning "wild, swinging, spinning". It is a common name in Norway, Iceland and the Faroe Islands; it is less common in Denmark and Sweden. It can also be a surname. Sverre may refer to:

== First name ==
=== Sverre ===
- Sverre of Norway (c. 1145/1151 – 1202)
- Prince Sverre Magnus of Norway (born 2005)
- Sverre Farstad (1920–1978), Norwegian speed skater
- Sverre Fehn (1924–2009), Norwegian architect
- Sverre Hassel (1876–1928), Norwegian polar explorer
- Sverre Haugli (disambiguation), several people
- Sverre Anker Ousdal (1944–2026), Norwegian actor
- Sverre Petterssen (1898–1974), Norwegian meteorologist
- Sverre Seeberg (born 1950), Norwegian sports official
- Sverre Steen (1898–1983), Norwegian history professor
- Sverre Stenersen (1926–2005), Norwegian skier

=== Sverri ===
- Sverri Sandberg Nielsen (born 1993) a Faroese rower
- Sverri Patursson (1871–1960), a Faroese writer

=== Sverrir ===
- Sverrir Garðarsson, Icelandic
- Sverrir Gudnason, Swedish
- Sverrir Hermannsson, Icelandic

== Last name ==
- Johan Sverre (actor)
- Johan Sverre (sports official)
