= Ole Sjetne =

Norwegian sports executive (1930–2005)

Ole Sjetne (11 July 1930 – 23 September 2005) was a Norwegian lawyer, banker and sports executive best known for leading the campaigns that brought the 1994 Winter Olympics to Lillehammer, and for serving as the first president of the Lillehammer Olympic Organizing Committee (LOOC).

== Career ==
Sjetne became involved in Lillehammer's Olympic ambitions in the early 1980s. Following a meeting of the Lillehammer executive council on 22 January 1982, a committee was created to plan a Winter Olympic bid, and Sjetne was placed at its head. On 1 October 1983, the limited company Lillehammer-OL 1992 AS was established to carry out the planning, with Sjetne as chairman and Arild Sletten as managing director.

The 1992 bid finished fourth of seven candidates at the 91st IOC Session in Lausanne on 17 September 1986, with the Games awarded to Albertville, France. Sjetne remained a leading figure in the subsequent campaign for the 1994 Winter Olympics, appearing among the group of sports figures publicly associated with the renewed bid, alongside Petter Rønningen, Grete Waitz, Hans B. Skaset and Per Ottesen.

After Lillehammer was awarded the 1994 Winter Games in 1988, Sjetne became the first leader, or "OL-president", of the Lillehammer Olympic Organizing Committee (LOOC), the body responsible for organising the Games. He held the position until October 1989, when he was succeeded by Gerhard Heiberg.

During his time with the Olympic organisation, Sjetne worked with banking executive Kjell O. Kran to secure Sparebanken NOR as the main bank of the 1994 Winter Olympics. The Peer Gynt Festival has noted that following Lillehammer's selection as host city in 1988, a senior IOC figure remarked that "the IOC did not choose a city, they chose people" — a reference to Sjetne, described by the festival as a bank manager and Supreme Court lawyer (høyesterettsadvokat).

Sjetne died on 23 September 2005, at the age of 75.

== Awards ==
In 1989, Sjetne received the Peer Gynt Prize (Årets Peer Gynt), a prize awarded annually since 1971 by vote of members of the Storting to a person or institution that has advanced Norway's reputation abroad through a socially beneficial contribution. The prize that year was awarded to the Olympic committee "represented by Ole Sjetne" (OL-komiteen ved Ole Sjetne), in recognition of the successful campaign to bring the Winter Olympics to Lillehammer.
