= Arne Myhrvold =

Norwegian sports official (born 1945)

Arne Myhrvold (born 12 June 1945) is a Norwegian sports official. He was president of the Norwegian Olympic Committee from 1989, of the Norwegian Confederation of Sports from 1994, and of the Norwegian Olympic and Paralympic Committee and Confederation of Sports after the merge, from 1996 to 1999. He served as sports director in the umbrella organization of European Olympic Committees from 1999 to 2002.

Sporting positions
Preceded by Jan Gulbrandsen	Chairman of the Norwegian Olympic Committee; 1989-1996	Succeeded by position abolished
Preceded by William Engseth	Chairman of the Norwegian Confederation of Sports; 1994-1996	Succeeded by position abolished
Preceded by position created	Chairman of the Norwegian Olympic Committee and Confederation of Sports; 1996-1999	Succeeded by Kjell Olav Kran
