= Tove Paule =

Norwegian sports official

Tove Paule (born 11 January 1951) is a Norwegian sports official.

She was the secretary general of the Norwegian Gymnastics Federation from 1995 to 2000, and became the president of the Norwegian Olympic and Paralympic Committee and Confederation of Sports in 2007. She withdrew in mid-2011, and instead ran for election to Drammen city council for the Conservative Party.

She represents the sports club Vestfossen IF. She is a sister of Torbjørn Paule, and aunt of Geir and Tor Håkon Holte.

Sporting positions
Preceded by Odd-Roar Thorsen (acting)	President of the Norwegian Confederation of Sports; 2007–2011	Succeeded by Børre Rognlien
