= Torfinn Bentzen =

Norwegian jurist and sports official

- Born: 1912
- Died: 1986 (aged 73–74)
- Occupations: Barrister and sports administrator

Torfinn Bentzen (1912–1986) was a Norwegian jurist and sports official.

He chaired the Norwegian Confederation of Sports from 1967 to 1973. He was a barrister by occupation.

Sporting positions
Preceded by Johan Chr. Schønheyder	Chairman of the Norwegian Confederation of Sports; 1967–1973	Succeeded by Ole Jacob Bangstad
