= Hans B. Skaset =

Norwegian civil servant and sports official

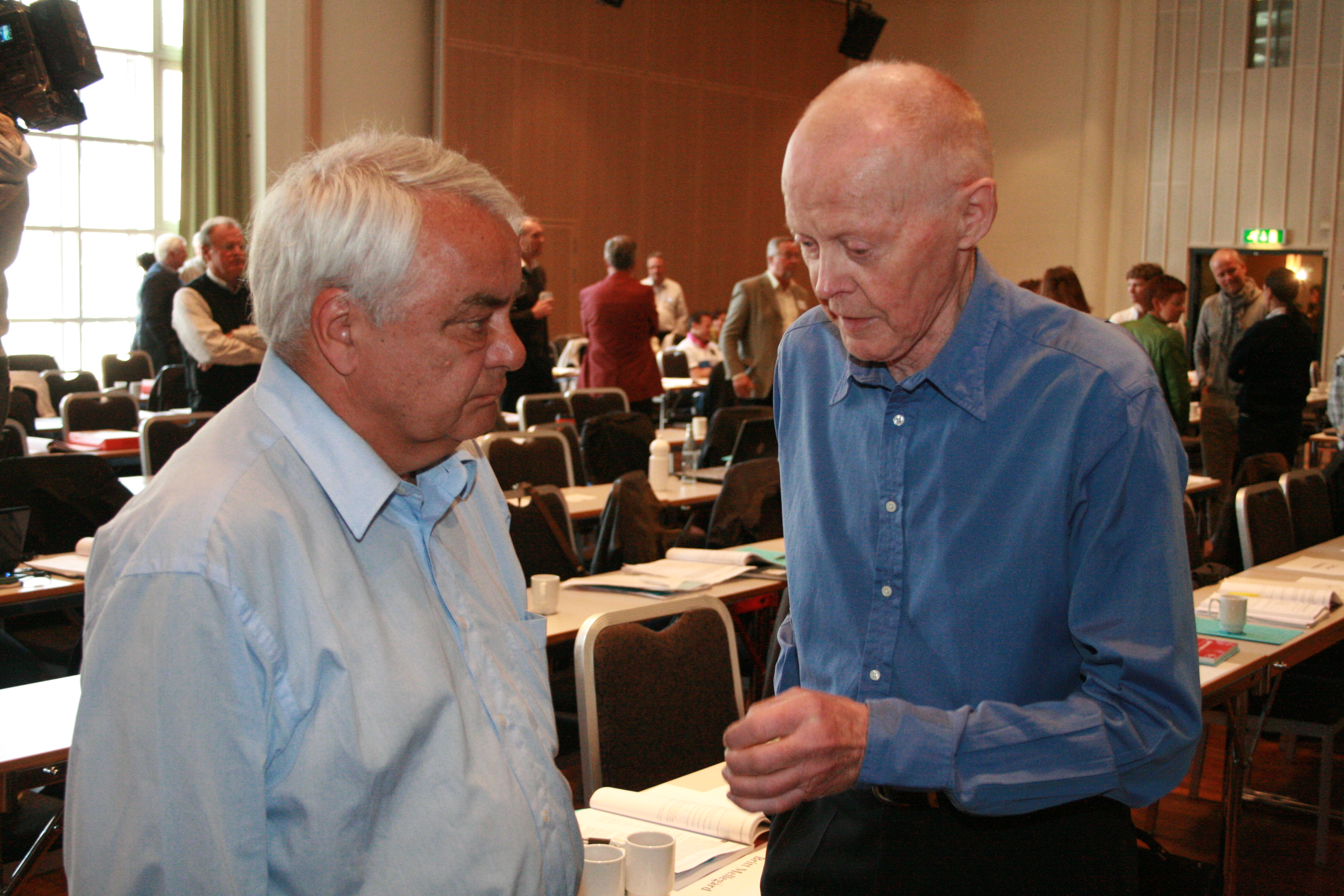
Skaset (right) with Per Ravn Omdal (left), 2011.

Hans Bernhard Skaset (born 10 April 1935) is a Norwegian athlete, sports scientist, sports official and civil servant. He was a three-time national champion in pentathlon and decathlon, as well as national team coach. He was notably a professor at the Norwegian School of Sport Sciences from 1975 to 1991, president of the Norwegian Athletics Federation from 1976 to 1983 and president of the Norwegian Confederation of Sports from 1984 to 1990.

== Early life and education ==
He was born in Åfjord as a son of farmers. Having hereditary rights to his family farm, he chose not to pursue it. He finished his secondary education at Eidsvoll Landsgymnas and took NCO school in 1953.

== Athlete and coach ==
While residing at Eidsvoll, Skaset represented the club IL Vito and competed in athletics. He won his first national title in 1960, in the decathlon. By that time, Skaset had moved to Oslo to attend the State School of Gymnastics. After graduation in 1957, he was hired as a national team coach in the Norwegian Athletics Association, serving as such from 1958 to 1964. He travelled around Europe to study training methods, including in Eastern Europe.

During the same period, his own active career blossomed as well. He changed clubs to IK Tjalve in 1961 and won the Norwegian championship in the pentathlon. In 1962, having changed clubs again to SK Freidig, he set his first Norwegian record in the decathlon. While Godtfred Holmvang had won the 1946 European Championships in 6987 points, the IAAF revised its scoring table in 1952 which adjusted the score to 6250 points. This was improved by Jan Gulbrandsen to 6296 points in 1959, and then by Hans B. Skaset to 6437 points in August 1962 in Vikersund. (Note: The series was: 11.6 (100 m), 7.09 (long jump), 12.78 (shot put), 1.76 (high jump), 51.5 (400 m), 16.0 (110 m hurdles), 42.39 (discus), 3.30 (pole vault), 48.70 (javelin), 4:23.5 (1500 m)) En route, he set personal bests in long jump, high jump and hurdles; the contest also had to be postponed for two hours as the pitch was swamped in rainwater. Skaset followed with a back-to-back Norwegian record in September 1962 at Trondheim Stadium, where Skaset reached 6763 points. While three events on day one were worse than during his previous record spell, he most notably improved by 1.3 seconds in the 400 metres, 4 metres in the discus throw, over 5 metres in the javelin throw and more than five and a half seconds in the 1500 metres. (Note: The series was: 11.2 (100 m), 6.86 (long jump), 12.38 (shot put), 1.65 (high jump), 50.2 (400 m), 15.8 (110 m hurdles), 46.38 (discus), 3.30 (pole vault), 53.89 (javelin), 4:17.8 (1500 m)) IAAF's next score revision in 1962 entailed that Skaset's record was adjusted to 7057 points, which stood for ten years until it was finally broken by Arild Bredholt in 1972. (Note: IAAF's final score revision in 1985 put Gulbrandsen at 6551, Skaset at 6713 and 6905 respectively, and Bredholt at 6944.) However, Skaset fell somewhat through at the 1962 Norwegian championships, only managing to take bronze in the decathlon. Having not even been on the podium after day one, Skaset clinched a medal by winning the discus event. He then won the national pentathlon title in 1963 and took silver in 1964.

== Professor and sports official ==
Skaset continued his education at Sagene Teachers' College and the University of Oslo, and was employed at the State School of Gymnastics in 1965. In 1968, the school was replaced by the Norwegian School of Sport Sciences. After a period as research fellow from 1972 to 1974, Skaset was appointed as a professor of sport at the Norwegian School of Sport Sciences in 1975. He also became involved in sports policymaking, penning the chapter on sports in Norway's first governmental report on culture policy in 1973, (Note: The formal name of the document is St. meld. nr. 8 (1973—74) Om organisering og finansiering av kulturarbeid.) in which the political goal of "sports for everyone" was cemented.

Skaset was also selected to gradually more central positions in the Norwegian sports organizations. He started out as deputy board member of the Norwegian Confederation of Sports in 1969, advancing to regular board member in 1971 and vice president in 1973. From 1974 he also sat on the Norwegian Olympic Committee. Skaset, now representing the club Kolbotn IL, then served as president of the Norwegian Athletics Federation from 1976 to 1983. He also sat on two IAAF committees, on eligibility and scheduling. Upon leaving the Norwegian Athletics Federation presidency, he entered the board of the European Athletics Association, before also being elected president of the Norwegian Confederation of Sports. He served in the latter position from 1984 to 1990. In 1990 he also left the Norwegian Olympic Committee.

During his time in the Norwegian Confederation of Sports, the organization drew out its first anti-doping guidelines in 1967. Skaset is also credited as one of the founders of Prosjekt 88, a project to improve Norwegian results at the 1988 Olympics (as Norway ended without any gold medals at the 1984 Summer Olympics). The Prosjekt 88 morphed into Olympiatoppen and Toppidrettssenteret, permanent centres for competence and excellence in Olympic sports, both co-located with the Norwegian School of Sport Sciences near Sognsvann.

== Civil servant ==
Skaset resigned as professor in 1991 to enter civil service as deputy under-secretary of state (ekspedisjonssjef) in the Ministry of Culture. He was responsible for the first governmental report solely focusing on sports, in 1992, followed by another in 1999. They were thematically linked to the governmental report on volunteer work.

Continuing his work within anti-doping, Skaset eventually ran afoul with the Norwegian Confederation of Sports. Following two doping cases at the 2000 Summer Olympics, Skaset raised a public debate accusing the sports leadership of operating in a grey zone. Then-president Kjell O. Kran demanded support from the Minister of Culture Ellen Horn, which Kran received. Horn's scathing of Skaset pushed him out of the Ministry of Culture, whence he resigned immediately in October 2000. Skaset had also criticized national and international sports leadership in 1999, among others IAAF under Primo Nebiolo. Skaset's criticism regarded elite sports as "pure business", fueled by "money, media and the market", and disregarding "local talent development, amateurism and volunteerism".

He returned to the Norwegian School of Sport Sciences as adjunct professor before working as a senior adviser at the Sogn og Fjordane University College from 2003 to 2005. In 2008 he became board member of Norske Idrettsleder-Veteraner, an elders' forum for former sports leaders, and served as president there from 2010 to 2012.

== Personal life ==
Skaset was married twice.

Skaset received the honorary badges from the Norwegian Athletics Federation in 1983, the Norwegian Confederation of Sports in 1985, and Norske Idrettsleder-Veteraner in 2025. He was upgraded to honorary membership of the Norwegian Confederation of Sports in 1990, further receiving the veterans' pin from the IAAF in 1993 and being proclaimed honorary council member of the European Athletics Association in 1995. In August 2025, at the age of 90, Skaset was awarded the King's Medal of Merit.

== Notes ==
Sporting positions
Preceded by Egil Gulliksen	President of the Norwegian Athletics Association; 1977–1983	Succeeded by Trygve Tamburstuen
Preceded by Ole Jacob Bangstad	President of the Norwegian Confederation of Sports; 1984–1990	Succeeded by William Engseth
