= William Sønsteng =

Norwegian artistic gymnast (born 2007)

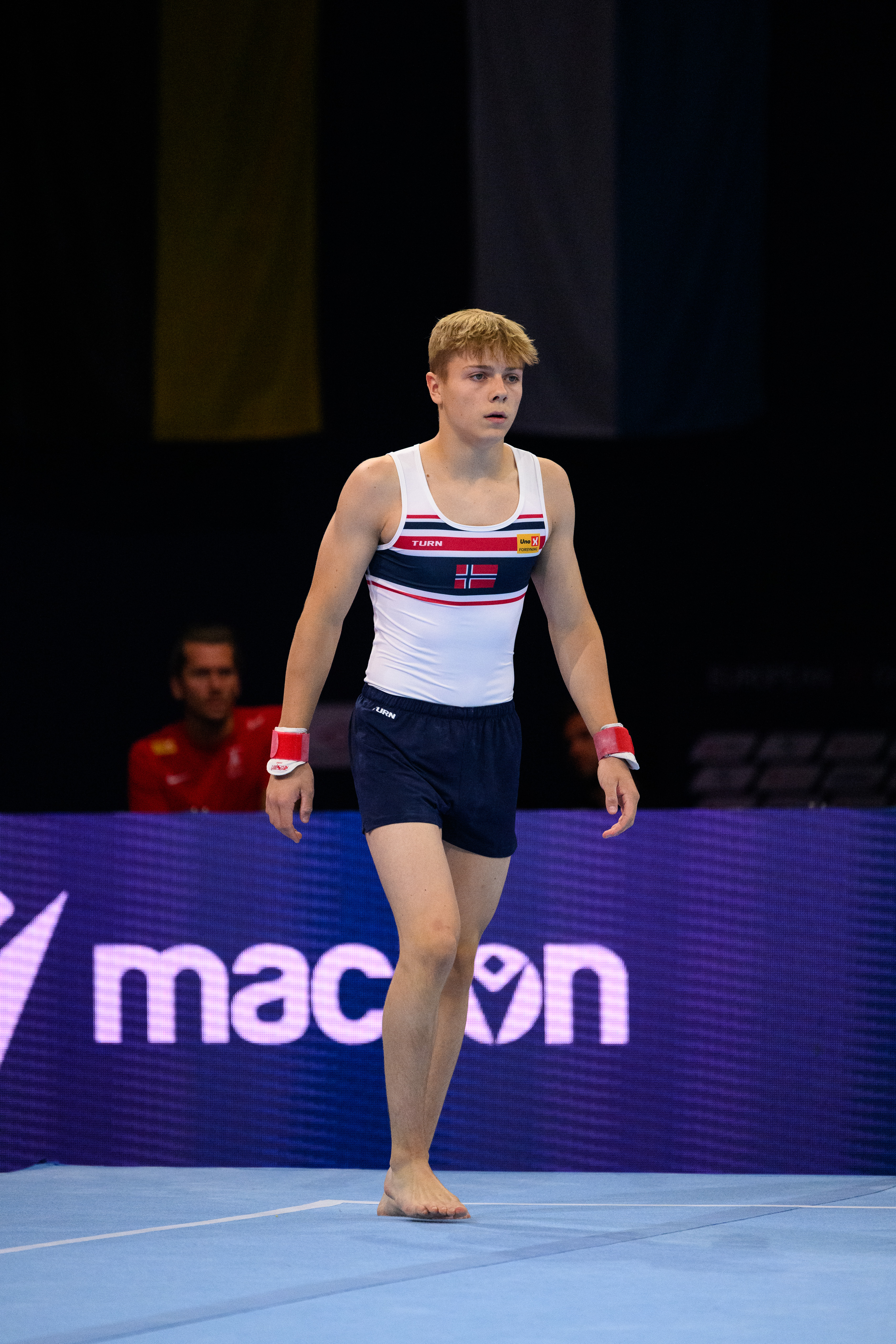
- Sønsteng in 2022

Personal information
- Born: 2007 (age 18–19)

Gymnastics career
- Discipline: Men's artistic gymnastics
- Country represented: Norway
- Club: Hoppensprett
Medal record
Representing Norway
Wohnen Juniors Trophy
Silver medal – second place	2022 Cottbus	Floor
Bronze medal – third place	2022 Cottbus	Parallel bars

William Sønsteng (born 2007) is an artistic gymnast on the Norwegian Gymnastics Federation junior national team. He holds the title as Norwegian junior champion in parallel bars, and has represented Norway in the 2022 European championships, the 2022 Berlin Junior Team Cup, and the 2022 Wohnen Juniors Trophy, earning a U16 silver and bronze medal in the latter competition.

== Gymnastics career ==
=== 2022 ===
In may of 2022, Sønsteng competed in the 2022 International Junior Team Cup in Berlin, and finished 26th in the youth all-around competition with 69.250 points. Along with teammate Sebastian Sponevik, the Norwegian team placed 11th in the team competition.

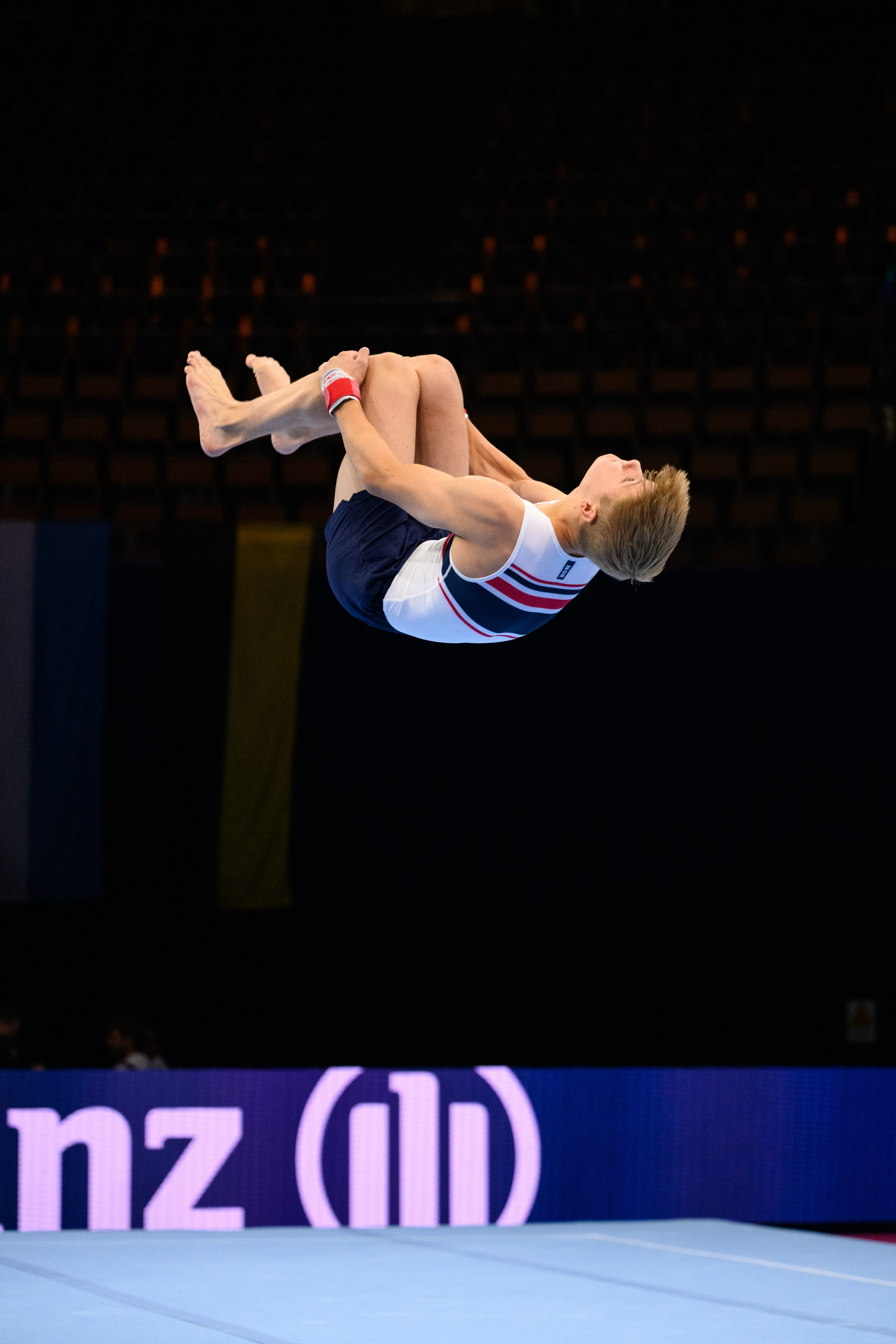
Sønsteng on floor at the European Championships

During the fall season of 2022, Sønsteng again competed internationally for the Norwegian national team. Having only competed in three apparatuses at the 2022 European championships, Sønsteng did not compete as an individual, but contributed to the team final in which Norway attained a 19th place.

In September of the same season, Sønsteng competed in the Wohnen Junior Trophy in Cottbus with an all-around score of 70.150, which earned him an eight place in the U16 competition, while subsequently qualifying for the floor, vault, parallel bars, and high bar finals. During the finals, Sønsteng attained a silver on floor and a bronze in parallel bars.

=== 2023 ===
In June 2023, Sønsteng competed at the Norwegian championships in Oslo, attaining a 5th place in the all-around competition with 69.800 points. Having qualified for multiple finals, he won gold on parallel bars, consequently earning the title of junior Norwegian champion.
