= Johan Martens =

Norwegian politician (1861–1932)

Johan Martens (20 November 1861 – 19 December 1932) was a Norwegian ship broker, politician for the Liberal Party and sports official.

He was a co-founder of Bergens TF in 1882, the Norwegian Gymnastics Federation in 1890 which he chaired from 1899 to 1911, and chaired Norges Riksforbund for Idræt from 1910 to 1914. He was a member of the City Council of Bergen during several periods.

Sporting positions
Preceded by position created	Chairman of the Norges Riksforbund for Idræt; 1910–1914	Succeeded by Johan Sverre
