= Fossli =

Fossli is a surname. Notable people with the surname include:

- Grethe Fossli (born 1954), Norwegian politician
- Sondre Turvoll Fossli (born 1993), Norwegian cross-country skier
- Willy Fossli (1931–2017), Norwegian footballer
