= Harald Liljedahl =

Norwegian sports official

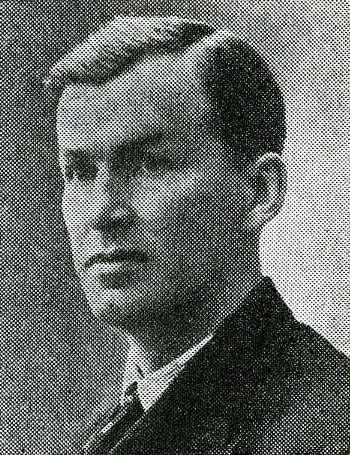
- Born: 19 November 1892; Larvik, Norway
- Died: 1940 (aged 47–48)
- Occupations: Cigar maker Trade unionist Sports official

Harald Liljedahl (19 November 1892 – 1940) was a Norwegian cigarmaker, trade unionist and sports official.

He was born in Larvik. He was the first chairman of the labour movement's sports confederation Arbeidernes Idrettsforbund (AIF), from 1924 to 1926. Himself, he was an active amateur boxer who before the sports schism in Norway represented the club Kristiania TF.

AIF was established in 1924, after various conflicts between the labour movement and Norges Landsforbund for Idrett. AIF represented c. 6,000 members in 1924, growing to about 32,000 members in 1930. Liljedahl died in 1940.
