= Olaf Wilhelm Petersen =

Norwegian military officer and sports official (1841–1909)

- Born: 13 December 1841; Christiania, Norway
- Died: 31 July 1909 (aged 67); Hvitsten
- Occupations: Military officer Sports official
- Awards: Order of St. Olav; Order of the Sword; Order of Wasa

Olaf Wilhelm Petersen (13 December 1841 – 31 July 1909) was a Norwegian military officer and sports official.

== Personal life ==
Petersen was born in Christiania to Peter Munch Petersen and Elisabeth Faye, and married Karen Faye in 1871.

== Career ==
Petersen graduated from the Norwegian Military Academy in 1861, and studied further at the Norwegian Military College and at Centralinstituttet in Stockholm. His assignments included being head of Den norske Garde in Stockholm from 1895 to 1901, and head of the Norwegian Military Academy from 1901 to 1907. He took actively part in the development of the sport of skiing, was a co-founder of Foreningen til Ski-Idrettens Fremme, served as judge at Husebyrennet and Holmenkollen Ski Festival, and chaired Skiforsøkskommisjonen from 1895 to 1900.

From 1885 to 1887 he chaired the sports association Centralforeningen for utbredelse af idræt.

== Awards and decorations ==
He was decorated Knight, First Class of the Order of St. Olav in 1895, was a Commander of the Order of the Sword, and a Knight of the Order of Wasa. He died in Hvitsten in 1909.

== Selected works ==
- Schema til ledning ved undervisningen i sprang och voltige, undarbeidet nærmest efter "Tabeller för gymnastiska centralinstitutets pedagogiska lärokurs, 3die uppl, Sthlm 1869" og sammes "Tillägg etc.". Christiania. 1873. OCLC 185311526.

Sporting positions
Preceded by Edvard Eriksen	Chairman of Centralforeningen; 1885–1887	Succeeded by Anders Løwlie
