= Zaineb Al-Samarai =

Norwegian politician

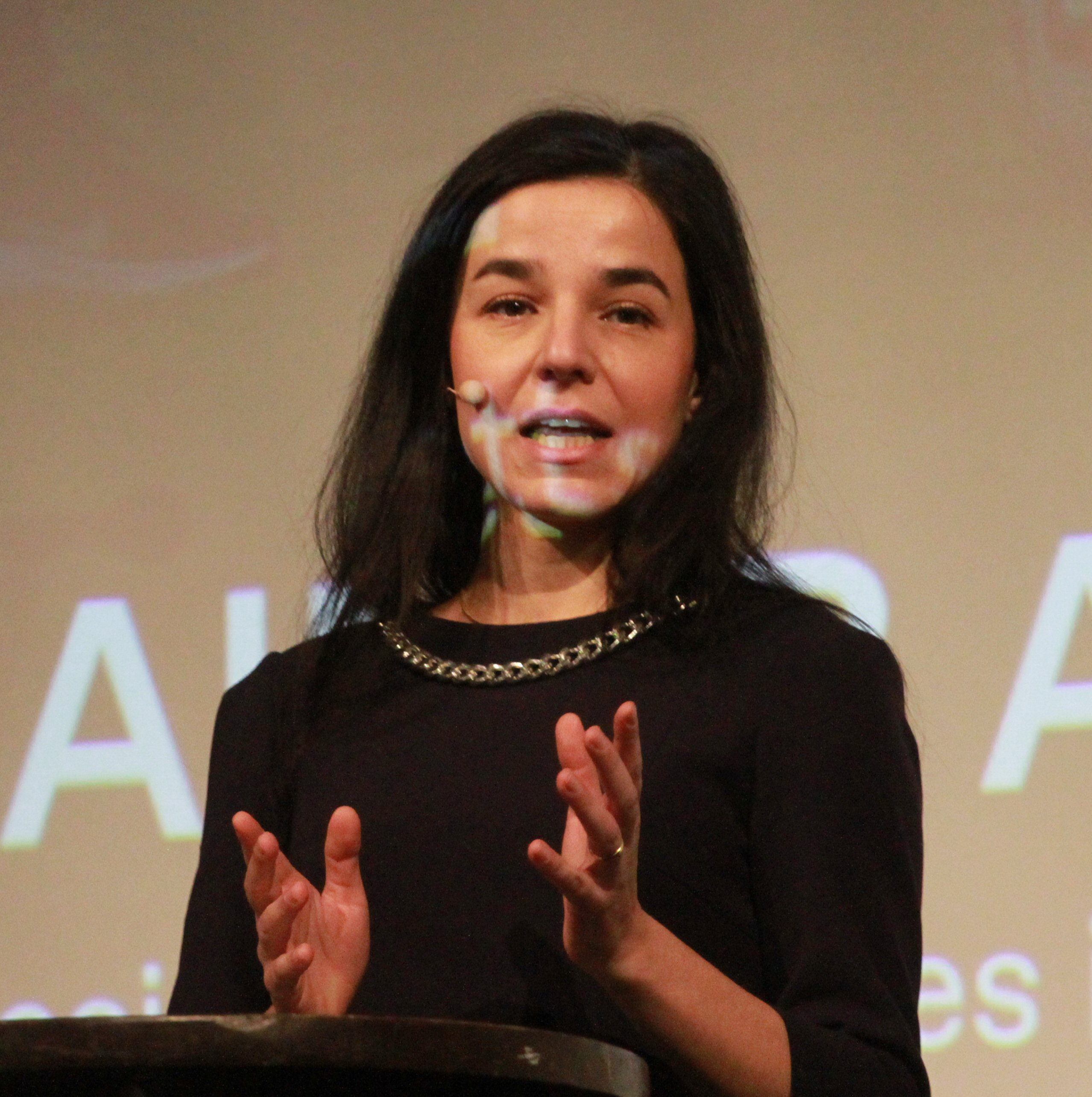

President of the Norwegian Confederation of Sports
- Incumbent
- Assumed office 4 June 2023
- First Vice President: Arne Bård Dalhaug
- Second Vice President: Sondre Sande Gullord
- Preceded by: Berit Kjøll

Deputy Member of the Storting
- In office 1 October 2017 – 30 September 2021
- Constituency: Oslo

Personal details
- Born: 22 October 1987 (age 38)
- Party: Labour
- Spouse: Jan Erik Fåne

Zaineb Al-Samarai (Arabic: زينب السامرائي; born 22 October 1987) is a Norwegian politician for the Labour Party. She is currently serving as the president of the Norwegian Confederation of Sports since 2023. She previously served as a deputy representative to the Parliament of Norway from Oslo from 2017 to 2021.

Hailing from Iraq, her family fled to Norway in 1994. Settling in Holmlia, Al-Samarai was elected to Oslo city council in 2011 and 2015 and has chaired Holmlia SK. She is a jurist by education.

In June 2023, she was elected President of the Norwegian Confederation of Sports, defeating incumbent Berit Kjøll in a 138–29 vote. She became the first person with a minority background to hold the position.

== Personal life ==
She is married to Jan Erik Fåne. In November 2023, she announced that she and Fåne were expecting a child and would go on paternity leave from March 2024.
