= Peter Ludvig Sylow =

Norwegian mathematician

Ludvig Sylow
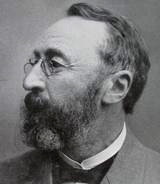
- Ludvig Sylow
- Born: Peter Ludvig Meidell Sylow; 12 December 1832; Christiania, Norway
- Died: 7 September 1918 (aged 85); Christiania, Norway
- Education: University of Christiania
- Known for: Sylow theorems
- Scientific career
- Fields: Mathematics

Peter Ludvig Meidell Sylow (/ˈsyːlɔv/) (12 December 1832 – 7 September 1918) was a Norwegian mathematician who proved foundational results in group theory.

Sylow processed and further developed the innovative works of mathematicians Niels Henrik Abel and Évariste Galois in algebra. Sylow theorems and p-groups, known as Sylow subgroups, are fundamental in finite groups. By profession, Sylow was a teacher at the Fredrikshald Latin School (Norwegian: Fredrikshalds lærde og realskole) for 40 years from 1858 to 1898, and then a professor at the University of Oslo for 20 years from 1898 to 1918. Despite the isolation in Fredrikshald, Sylow was an active member of the mathematical world. He wrote a total of approximately 25 mathematical and biographical works, corresponded with many of the leading mathematicians of the time, and was an able co-editor of Acta Mathematica from the journal's start in 1882. He was also elected into the Norwegian Academy of Science and Letters in 1868, a corresponding member of the Academy of Sciences in Göttingen and the University of Copenhagen awarded him an honorary doctorate in 1894.

== Early life ==
Ludvig Sylow was born in Kristiania (now Oslo) on 12 December 1832 to later minister and customs treasurer Thomas Edvard von Westen Sylow (1792–1875) and Magdalene Cecilie Cathrine Mejdell (1806–98). His father had been an officer and a captain in the cavalry, and later he served as the head of the Ministry of the Army between 1848 and 1854.

Initially, his father was aware of his son's talent in mathematics, so he encouraged him to work independently. From home, Sylow learned a sense of duty and hard work, but was also taught to be modest and although this was done with the best of intentions, it would become an obstacle for him later in life since it meant that he was happy to spend many years in a more lowly position than he should have had.

== Career as a mathematician ==
=== Education and first steps in mathematics ===
Sylow attended Christiania Cathedral School, graduating in 1850 after taking the examen artium. He then became a student at the University of Oslo where he began his studies of natural sciences. In 1853, the University of Oslo awarded him the Crown Prince's gold medal (Kronprinsens gullmedalje) for a Mathematics subject about Gnomonics. In 1856 he took the high school mathematics teacher's examination (Realkandidat, Norwish to Real candidate) with excellent grades.

He completed his graduation in 1856, but since no university post was available, he taught for two years at Hartvig Nissen School, an independent girls' school in the Uranienborg district of Christiania, which had been founded by Hartvig Nissen and Ole Jacob Broch. His years there came during Broch's most energetic university period, and it was Broch who inspired Sylow to study Carl Gustav Jacob Jacobi's fundamental work on elliptic functions, among other things.

In 1858, Sylow moved to the town of Fredrikshald (now called Halden) in Østfold county, where he taught at Fredrikshald Latin School (Norwegian: Fredrikshalds lærde og realskole) as the Head Teacher in Mathematics and Science, a modest position that he held for a whole 40 years, from 1858 to 1898, except for 1861 and 62 when he continued studies in Paris and Berlin and when he substitute taught for Broch at University of Christiania.

=== Abel and the theory of equations ===
During his studies, Sylow had become interested in the work of Niels Henrik Abel, and especially in an unfinished work on equation theory that had been left behind. However, it was only at Hartvig Nissen School (1856–58) that he began to research that work more deeply, in part thanks to Ole Jacob Broch, who was the school's pure mathematics teacher at the time. It was Broch who gave the young teacher Sylow much encouragement to continue his advanced mathematical researches. Although at first Sylow found reading Abel's papers a difficult task, he managed to struggle through them and soon found that Abel had achieved a far deeper understanding of the theory of equations than what he had managed to write in his published papers.

Some of Sylow's first attempts to publish some of Abel's unpublished results that he had found in his papers proved to be unsuccessful. For instance, he sent one of these papers to Crelle's Journal in Berlin, but the editor there, Leopold Kronecker, rejected the article. Sylow showcased his discoveries at a Scandinavian meeting of naturalists in 1860 in Copenhagen, where he presented a solid interpretation of a strange equation-theoretic treatise by Abel, edited only in fragments.

=== Failure to join a university ===
In 1861 Sylow obtained a scholarship for studies in Paris and Berlin. In Paris he attended lectures by Michel Chasles on the theory of conics, by Joseph Liouville on rational mechanics and by Jean-Marie Duhamel on the theory of limits. He also used this scholarship to make himself acquainted with newer works, particularly in the theory of equations. In Berlin, Sylow had useful discussions with Kronecker, but was unable to attend courses by Karl Weierstrass who was ill at the time, and since there were no other courses being given in Berlin that interested him, Sylow instead decided to work in the library, studying number theory and the theory of equations.

In the following year, in 1862, Sylow lectured at the University of Christiania as a substitute for Professor Ole Jacob Broch, who had been elected to serve in the Storting, the Norwegian parliament. In his lectures Sylow explained Abel's and Galois's work on algebraic equations, and in doing so he became one of the first in Europe to lecture on Évariste Galois's works. Among his listeners was the young Sophus Lie, who would later create a strange new science on the basis of these ideas, the theory of continuous symmetry.

Lie once commented that Sylow deserved a university position because of his "broad knowledge, his sharp powers of criticism, and his outstanding mathematical work". And for a time, it seemed that the university would finally bet on him since he had received a scholarship trip to Berlin and Paris in 1861, and then spent a year doing the mathematical lectures at the Christiania University during Broch's absence abroad, during which he also began to treat and lecture Galois' group theory. But instead, his career simply stopped. When Broch again became an MP in the Storting from 1865 to 1868, he was keen to have Sylow take over the teaching of his university during this time, but the school in Fredrikshald in which Sylow was a teacher refused to give him leave to teach at the Christiania university, and they received support from the ministry. Broch left his chair as professor of pure mathematics in 1869, thus leaving a vacancy that Sylow was well qualified to have filled, and in fact, everyone expected Sylow to take over his professorship in pure mathematics. However, the University of Christiania did not rate pure mathematics very highly at that time, preferring more practical, useful, down-to-earth mathematics with more applicable topics, and Sylow was too theoretical in his approach so he was not appointed. The professor of applied mathematics, Carl Anton Bjerknes, was instead pressured to move into Broch's position, so that Cato Guldberg could take over the applied mathematics.

=== Sylow's theorems ===
Sylow was known to mathematicians of every civilized country on account of a well-known theorem that bears his name. Just as every educated person knows the Pythagorean theorem so does every mathematician speak of Abel's theorem and Sylow's theorem.

— Ferdinand Georg Frobenius

Since few contemporary mathematicians were as deeply familiar with Abel's work as Sylow was, Professor Carl Anton Bjerknes advised him to study Évariste Galois's works about group theory, in which Abel had also contributed a lot. However, it was only when Sylow began to lecture about Abel's and Galois's work on algebraic equations in 1862, that he began to further develop their innovative works, especially those related to group theory, and in fact, by the end of that year, Sylow had already proved foundational results in group theory, which are now known as Sylow theorems and p-groups, known as Sylow subgroups, which are now basic terms in group theory. He was thus one of the first mathematicians to penetrate Galois' group theory. However, it was not until 1872, 10 years later, that Sylow published his most important discoveries in group theory in Alfred Clebsch's journal (Math. Ann.), in a small treatise of ten pages called Theorémes sur les groupes de substitutions, in which Sylow generalizes his discoveries and proves what is perhaps the most profound result in the theory of finite groups. Almost all work on finite groups uses Sylow's theorems.

When the famous French mathematician Camille Jordan published the standard work Théorie des Substitutions in 1870, Sylow was familiar with most of what was written there and more. When Jordan visited Christiania in 1872, Sophus Lie took him on an excursion to Frognerseteren with Sylow, who described to him what is now called "Sylow's theorem", which he had known since 1862. Jordan was astonished and somewhat skeptical, but shortly afterwards, he wrote enthusiastically from Sweden, and he helped Sylow to get that 10-page thesis published that same year in 1872. That thesis made Sylow a well-known European mathematician.

=== Written works ===
In 1868 he was elected into the Norwegian Academy of Science and Letters (Det Norske Widenskaps-Akademi). From 1870 to 1871, Sylow exchanged nine letters with Julius Petersen who, at this time, was working on his doctoral dissertation. Petersen sought Sylow's advice about the main theorem of his dissertation and all of these letters deal are about this subject. The two mathematicians exchanged another sixteen letters a few years later, in 1876 and 1877.

However, Sylow's most well-known written work rests on his 10-page thesis published in 1872 called Théorèmes sur les groupes de substitutions (Theorems on substitution groups), which was published in Mathematische Annalen Volume 5 (pages 584 to 594). This paper has the three Sylow theorems, which prove foundational results in group theory. Sylow had already proved this in 1862, but only published it in 1872, and by then, Augustin-Louis Cauchy had already proved that a group whose order is divisible by a prime p has a subgroup of order p. Winfried Scharlau described how Sylow was led to his discovery by his study of Galois' work, in particular of Galois' criterion for the solvability of equations of prime degree. The paper explains how Sylow used methods from Galois theory in his proofs.

Besides the thesis of 1872, Sylow's main work was the new edition of Abel's collected writings which he procured in association with former student Sophus Lie on a public basis, when in 1873, Sylow and Lie were commissioned to provide a new edition of Niels Henrik Abel's collected works, paid for by the state. The preparations for the publication of this work took eight years, from 1873 to 1881, during which he had only partial leave from his teaching work, being on leave from school for four years. Sylow and Lie prepared an edition of Abel's complete work published under the title Oeuvres complète de Niels Henrik Abel (French for: Complete Works of Niels Henrik Abel). The motivation for this had come from the Norwegian Academy of Science who applied to the Norwegian Parliament for funding for the project, which was quickly granted. This funding allowed Sylow to take leave from his school in Fredrikshald for four years in order to devote himself to the project. Sylow wanted as much as possible of Abel's early works to come out, not just his great treatises with their exemplary stringency, and thus, he used this opportunity to dig up more of his early works, and in fact, there was much more additional Abel material published in the Sylow/Lie edition which appeared on 9 December 1881, than what Bjerknes used on his Abel biography of 1880.

In 1902, Sylow, in collaboration with Elling Holst, published Abel's correspondence. Further Abel documents had been discovered after the Sylow/Lie book came out in 1881 and, at the Third Scandinavian Congress of Mathematicians, which was held in Kristiania in 1913, Sylow discussed this new material. In addition to the Sylow theorems and the Abel material, Sylow also published a few papers on elliptic functions, particularly on complex multiplication, as well as papers on group theory.

=== Later career ===
In 1883 Sylow became an editor of Acta Mathematica, was elected a member of the Academy of Sciences of Göttingen and, in 1894, the University of Copenhagen awarded him an honorary doctorate.

A couple of times in his youth, Sylow briefly had the prospect of becoming a lecturer at a university, where he had absolutely belonged from the first moment, but the disfavor of the times left him unnoticed in his native land despite his name being already widely known outside Norway. As a result, Sylow spent a whole 40 years, from 1858 to 1898, holding the modest position of head teacher in mathematics and science at the Fredrikshald Latin School, a long reign that came to an end when Sylow was finally appointed as a professor of mathematics at the University of Oslo in 1898, and despite already being 65 when he obtained a university post, he was still able to hold this position for 20 years, until 1918, when he died at the age of 85. His rare talent in mathematics revealed itself immediately upon his arrival at the university, to which he brought knowledge far beyond elementary mathematics. At first, he was paid a headmaster's salary, which was approximately half the salary of a university professor, but he later received salary increases.

At the centenary of Abel's birth in 1902, Sylow gave the welcoming address at a conference to mark the centenary of his birth, giving a characterization of his predecessor, who was hailed by all the famous mathematicians of the various countries who had met together as the one who will stand as the permanent.

== Personal life ==
Sylow never married, but was a warm person with a nice sense of humour. He was an avid lover of being outdoors and often spent summer vacations in the mountains, usually in Kongsvoll, where he studied plants. Kongsvoll is a mountain station providing food and shelter on the route between Oslo and Trondheim, erected when the route was used by pilgrims visiting the shrine of St Olav in Trondheim.

== Death ==
Sylow died on 7 September 1918, at the age of 85, in Christiania, Norway.

== Honors ==
- The Crown Prince's Gold Medal (1853)
- The Norwegian Academy of Science and Letters, elected in 1868
- Corresponding member of the Academy of Sciences in Göttingen (1893)
- Editor of Acta Mathematica from (1893)
- Honorary doctorate at Copenhagen University (1894)
