= Arthur Ruud =

Norwegian civil servant, trade unionist and sports administrator

- Born: 7 November 1905
- Died: 29 September 1974 (aged 68)
- Occupations: Civil servant, trade unionist, sports leader
- Awards: Order of St. Olav

Arthur Ruud (7 November 1905 – 29 September 1974) was a Norwegian civil servant, trade unionist and sports official. He chaired the trade union Norsk Telegraf- og Telefonforbund from 1930 to 1949. He was a leader of Arbeidernes Idrettsforbund from 1935 to 1939, and of the Norwegian Confederation of Sports from 1948 to 1951. He was decorated Knight, First Class of the Royal Norwegian Order of St. Olav in 1961.
