= Grethe Fossli =

Norwegian politician

Grethe Fossli (born 21 December 1954 in Bærum) is a Norwegian politician for the Labour Party.

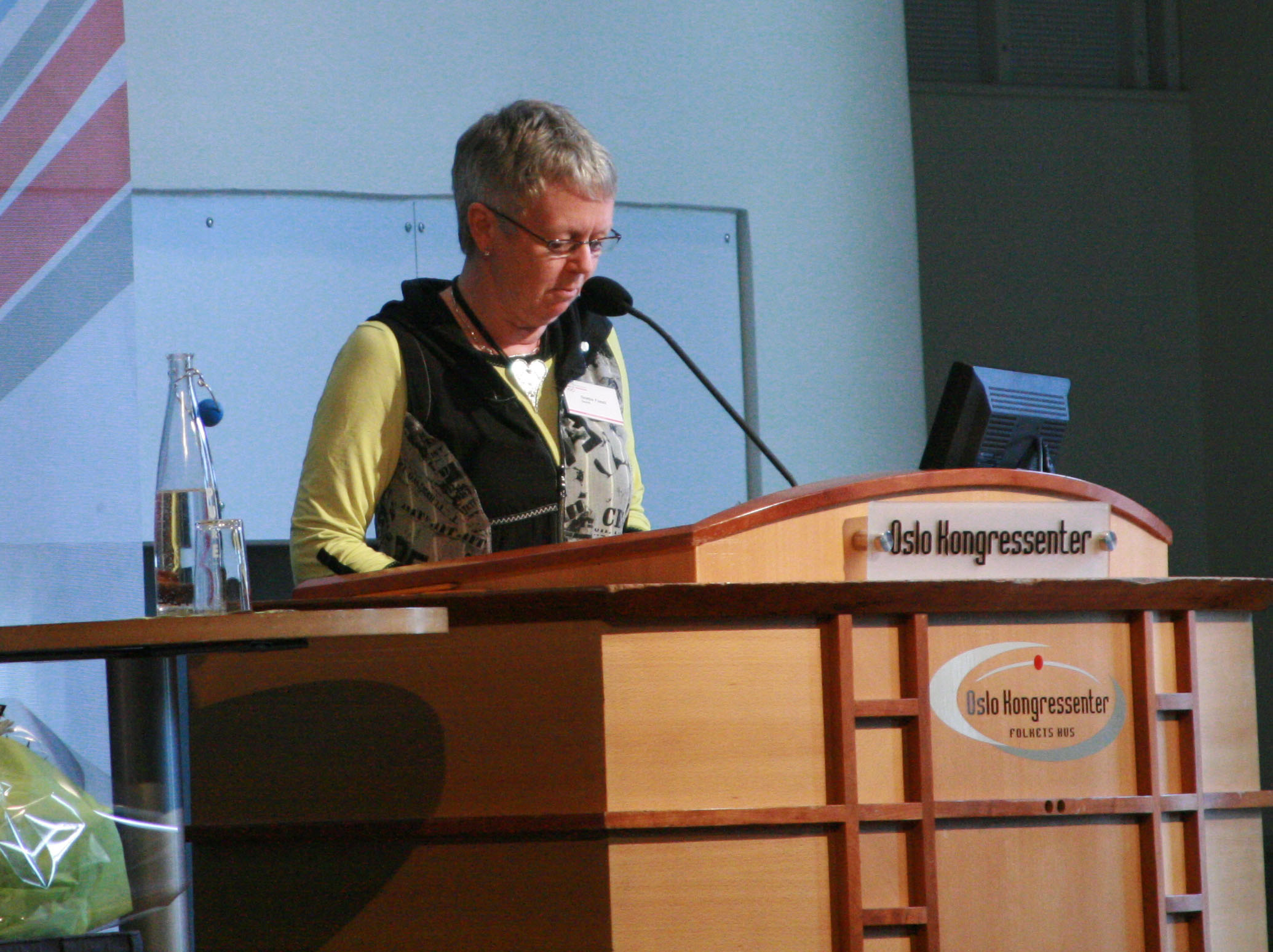

She was elected to the Norwegian Parliament from Akershus in 1993, and was re-elected on two occasions.

Sporting positions
Preceded by Kjell O. Kran	President of the Norwegian Confederation of Sports; 2004 (acting)	Succeeded by Karl-Arne Johannessen
