= Berit Kjøll =

Norwegian corporate officer and sports executive

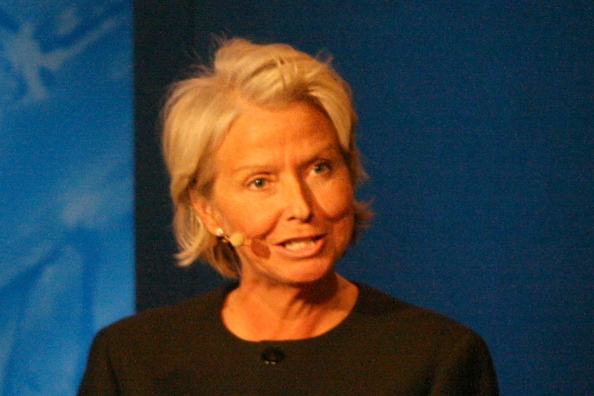

President of the Norwegian Confederation of Sports
- In office 26 May 2019 – 4 June 2023
- First Vice President: Vibecke Sørensen
- Second Vice President: Johann Olav Koss
- Preceded by: Tom Tvedt
- Succeeded by: Zaineb Al-Samarai

Personal details
- Born: 30 November 1955 (age 70)
- Education: Economist
- Alma mater: Harvard Business School (AMP)
- Occupation: Corporate officer

Berit Kjøll (born 30 November 1955) is a Norwegian economist, corporate officer and sports administrator. She served as the president of the Norwegian Confederation of Sports from 2019 to 2023.

== Early and personal life ==
Born on 30 November 1955, Kjøll has studied market economy at Norges Markedshøyskole, and tourism at the Oppland Distriktshøgskole. She has further education in administration from Harvard Business School.

== Career ==
Kjøll has held leading administrative positions in Universitetenes Reisebyrå, Norgesparken with Tusenfryd and Vikinglandet, Flytoget, Steen & Strøm and Telenor. She was appointed director of Huawei Norway in 2011, and assumed this position until 2019. She served as chairman of the board of the Norwegian Trekking Association from 2012 to 2018, and in SJ Norge AS. She has been board member of Hurtigruten and InterOil, as well as Norges Rytterforbund, DNB ASA, Scandinavian Airlines, Aker Holding, Norges Varemesse AS and Oslo University Hospital.

She was voted president of the Norwegian Confederation of Sports in 2019, edging out Sven Mollekleiv with a vote margin of two. She sought re-election in 2023, but lost to her opponent Zaineb Al-Samarai in a 138–29 vote.

Sporting positions
Preceded by Tom Tvedt	President of the Norwegian Confederation of Sports; 2019–2023	Succeeded by Zaineb Al-Samarai
