= Peer Gynt Prize =

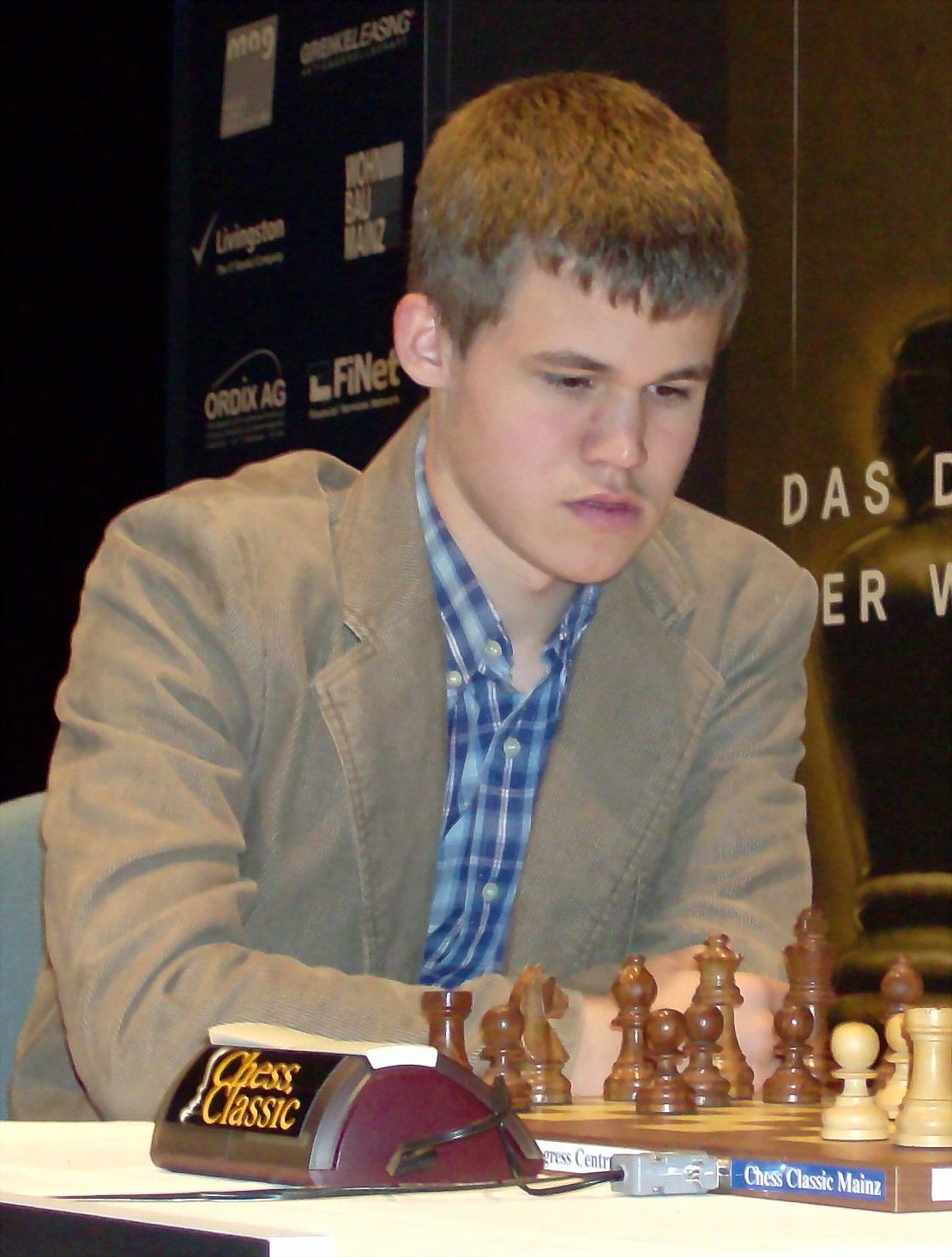
Magnus Carlsen, the 2011 winner

The Peer Gynt Prize or the Peer Gynt Award (Årets Peer Gynt or Per Gynt-prisen) is a private Norwegian prize presented annually by the private commercial company Peer Gynt AS during the Peer Gynt Festival, also organised by the same company. The Peer Gynt Prize is named after the main character in Peer Gynt (1867), a five-act play in verse by Norwegian dramatist Henrik Ibsen. The prize is awarded to people or institutions who have marked themselves in a positive way nationally and internationally. However, the prize has received criticism for misrepresenting the Peer Gynt character, who is portrayed in Ibsen's play as quintessentially immoral and selfish.

The Peer Gynt Prize has been awarded every year since 1971. The recipient of the annual prize is chosen by the private company Peer Gynt AS and is given to a person or institution that has achieved distinction in society and contributed to improving Norway's international reputation in the company's view. It was first awarded to Einar Gerhardsen for his efforts as prime minister in rebuilding the country after World War II.

Members of the Peer Gynt Festival itself, parliamentary representatives and former winners of the year's Peer Gynt prize may propose candidates for the award. Former award-winners form a network connected to the Peer Gynt Festival. The award is a bronze statuette of Peer Gynt riding a reindeer buck (Peer Gynt-statuetten), made by artist Carl Bilgrei.

The Peer Gynt Prize award ceremony takes place during the Peer Gynt Festival (Peer Gynt-stemnet) at Vinstra in Gudbrandsdalen, one of Norway's leading festivals. Peer Gynt Festival is a 12-day cultural festival that takes place in the beginning of August each year. The first Festival was held in 1928, for the centennial of Henrik Ibsen's birth.

== Prize winners ==
- 1971: Einar Gerhardsen, former Prime Minister
- 1972: Per Aabel, actor
- 1973: Liv Ullmann, actress
- 1974: Erik Bye, singer and artist
- 1975: Erling Stordahl, singer and advocate for disabled persons
- 1976: Øivind Bergh, conductor
- 1977: Birgit and Rolf Sunnaas, founders of Sunnaas Hospital
- 1978: Arve Tellefsen, violinist
- 1979: Grete Waitz, marathon runner
- 1980: Anne-Cath. Vestly, author
- 1981: Cato Zahl Pedersen, disabled sportsperson
- 1982: Jens Evensen, diplomat, lawyer and politician
- 1983: Thorbjørn Egner, author and artist
- 1984: Crown Princess Sonja
- 1985: Bobbysocks, winners of the Eurovision Song Contest
- 1986: Annie Skau Berntsen, nurse and missionary
- 1987: a-ha, musical group
- 1988: Oslo Philharmonic Orchestra
- 1989: Norwegian Olympic Committee, Ole Sjetne
- 1990: Thorvald Stoltenberg, politician and United Nations official
- 1991: Hans-Wilhelm Steinfeld, journalist
- 1992: Bjørn Dæhlie and Vegard Ulvang, cross-country skiers
- 1993: Kjetil André Aamodt, alpine skier
- 1994: Mona Juul and Terje Rød Larsen, diplomats
- 1995: Johann Olav Koss, speed skater and founder of Right To Play
- 1996: Jostein Gaarder, author
- 1997: Gro Harlem Brundtland, United Nations official and former Prime Minister
- 1998: Norway women's national handball team, Marit Breivik
- 1999: Thor Heyerdahl, ethnographer and adventurer
- 2000: Bellona Foundation environmental organization
- 2001: Knut Vollebæk, politician and diplomat
- 2002: Eva Joly, lawyer against corruption
- 2003: Åsne Seierstad, journalist and author
- 2004: Arne Næss, philosopher and mountaineer
- 2005: Jan Egeland, diplomat and United Nations official
- 2006: Kjell Inge Røkke, entrepreneur
- 2007: Leif Ove Andsnes, pianist
- 2008: Snøhetta AS, international architecture company
- 2009: Ole Gunnar Solskjær, footballer and UNICEF ambassador
- 2010: Dissimilis Norway
- 2011: Magnus Carlsen, chess player
- 2012: Marit Bjørgen and Jens Stoltenberg
- 2013: Jo Nesbø, author and musician
- 2014: Norway Cup, one of the world's largest football tournaments
- 2015: May-Britt Moser and Edvard Moser, scientists and Nobel Prize winners in 2014
- 2016: Deeyah Khan, film director, music producer, composer and human rights defender.
- 2017: Julie Andem, director, screenwriter and television producer
- 2018: Elisabeth Hoff, nurse, humanitarian aid worker in Syria 2012–2019
- 2019: Kjetil Jansrud and Aksel Lund Svindal, alpine skiers
- 2020: Maja Lunde, author
- 2021: Birgit Skarstein, paralympic athlete
- 2022: Maren Lundby, ski jumper
- 2023: Lise Klaveness, lawyer and footballer
- 2024: Médecins Sans Frontières, humanitarian organization
- 2025: Benjamin Ree, director
- 2026: Jannicke Mikkelsen, director and astronaut
