= Marcus Fredrik Bang =

Danish-Norwegian priest

Right Reverend Marcus Fredrik Bang
- Bishop
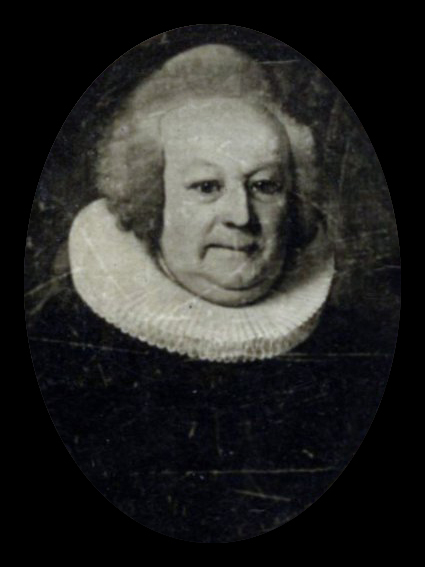
- Marcus Frederik Bang, He was the bishop of the Diocese of Trondhjem.
- Church: Church of Norway
- Diocese: Trondhjem

Personal details
- Born: 14 August 1711 Næstved, Denmark
- Died: 15 June 1789 (aged 77) Trondheim, Norway
- Denomination: Christian
- Occupation: Priest

Marcus Fredrik Bang (14 August 1711 – 15 June 1789) was a Danish-Norwegian priest. He was the bishop of the Diocese of Trondhjem from 1773 until 1787. He was born in Næstved, Denmark in 1711 and died in 1789 in Trondheim, Norway.

He had his theological training in Copenhagen, Denmark. Starting in 1739 he was the hospital priest in Trondheim, Norway. Then in 1769 he was appointed to the post of parish priest for the Trondheim Cathedral, but didn't assume the position until 1771. Then he was appointed the bishop of Nidaros Diocese from 1773 until 1787.

Marcus Fredrik Bang was married three times:

- 1740 Anna Lisbeth Schønning from Ribe, 3 children
- 1747 Ellen Susanna Hagerup, daughter of Bishop Eiler Hagerup d.e. Their daughter, Christiane married bishop of the Diocese of Bjorgvin Ole Irgens.
- 1752 Mette Margarethe Volqvartz, 3 children

Church of Norway titles
Preceded by Johan Ernst Gunnerus	Bishop of Trondhjem; 1773–1787	Succeeded by Johan Christian Schønheyder
