= Lars Christian Dahll =

Norwegian military officer and politician

Lars Christian Dahll (5 November 1823 – 29 November 1908) was a Norwegian military officer and politician.

He chaired Centralforeningen for Udbredelse af Legemsøvelser og Vaabenbrug from 1878 to 1881. On 3 April 1884, he was made Minister of the Army in the short-lived cabinet of Christian Homann Schweigaard, who had to resign on 26 June the same year.

Sporting positions
Preceded by Lars Broch	Chairman of Centralforeningen; 1878–1881	Succeeded by Edvard Eriksen
Political offices
Preceded by Anders Sandøe Ørsted Bull (acting)	Norwegian Minister of Defence; April 1884–June 1884	Succeeded by Ludvig Daae
