= Vestfossen IF =

Norwegian sports club

- Full name: Vestfossen Idrettsforening
- Founded: January 20, 1910
- Ground: RVS Parken Vestfossen, Vestfossen
- Manager: Frode Johannessen
- League: 4. divisjon
- 2024: 4. divisjon / Buskerud, 1st of 14
Home colours

Vestfossen Idrettsforening is a Norwegian sports club from Vestfossen, Øvre Eiker, Buskerud. It has sections for association football, team handball, Nordic skiing, gymnastics and tennis.

It was founded on January 20, 1910.

The men's football team plays in the Third Division, the fourth tier of Norwegian football.

The club has also been represented in the leadership of Norwegian sports, since Tove Paule represents the club.
