= Lars Broch =

Norwegian topographer and military officer

- Born: 1 April 1826; Fredrikstad, Norway
- Died: 1 July 1882 (aged 56); Halden
- Occupations: Topographer; Military officer Sports official
- Awards: Order of St. Olav; Order of the Dannebrog; Order of the Sword

Lars Marius Bing Broch (1 April 1826 – 1 July 1882) was a Norwegian topographer, military officer and sports official.

Broch was born in Fredrikstad to Lars Ziegler Broch and Susanne Marie Bing, and married Justine Bing in 1853. He graduated as military officer in 1845. His assignments included being head of the 1st Akershus Infantry Brigade and commander of Fredriksten. From 1863 he was appointed topographer for Den geografiske opmaaling. He chaired the Norwegian Trekking Association, Kristiania Militære Samfund and the sports association Centralforeningen for utbredelse af idræt. His works include textbooks in geography for primary school, and Lærebog i landmaaling from 1861.

Broch was decorated Knight, First Class of the Order of St. Olav in 1870, was a Commander of the Order of the Dannebrog, and a Knight of the Order of the Sword. He died in Halden in 1882.

== Selected works ==
- Lærebog i landmaaling. 1861.

Sporting positions
Preceded by Otto Richard Kierulf	Chairman of Centralforeningen; 1869–1878	Succeeded by Lars Christian Dahll
