= Tom Tvedt =

Norwegian politician (born 1968)

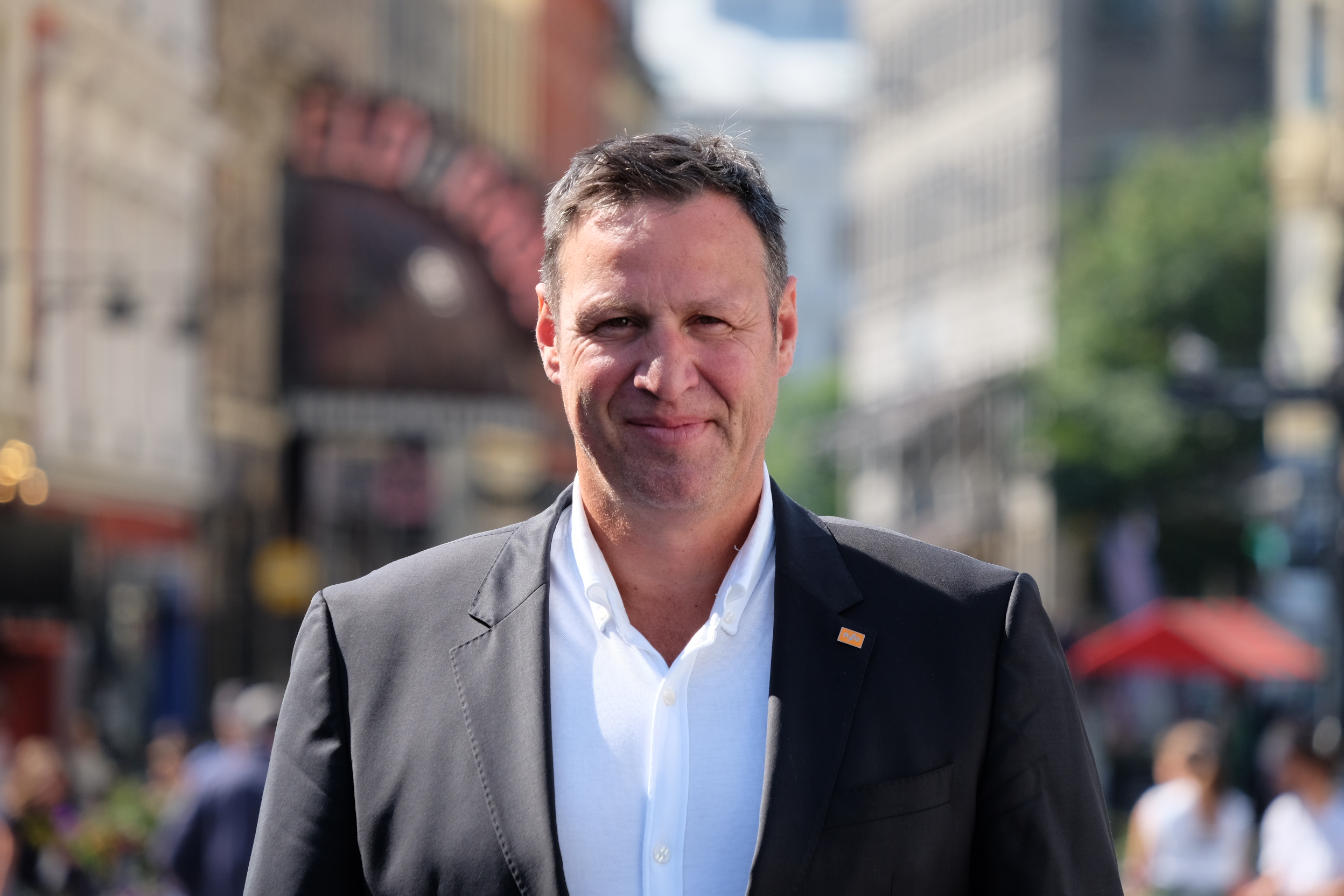
- Tvedt in 2010

President of the Norwegian Confederation of Sports
- In office 7 June 2015 – 26 May 2019
- Preceded by: Børre Rognlien
- Succeeded by: Berit Kjøll

County Mayor of Rogaland
- In office 23 October 2007 – 25 October 2011
- Deputy: Ellen Solheim
- Preceded by: Roald G. Bergsaker
- Succeeded by: Janne Johnsen

Mayor of Randaberg Municipality
- In office October 1999 – 5 October 2007
- Deputy: Leif Egil Torkelsen
- Preceded by: Olav Sande
- Succeeded by: Tone Tvedt Nybø

Personal details
- Born: 31 January 1968 (age 58) Randaberg Municipality, Rogaland, Norway
- Party: Labour
- Spouse: Kjersti Stenseng (m. 2024)
- Children: 2

Tom Tvedt (born 31 January 1968) is a Norwegian politician and former handball player for the Labour Party.

== Political career ==
He became county mayor of Rogaland following the 2007 local elections. He held the position until 2011. Before this he was the mayor of Randaberg Municipality for eight years between 1999 and 2007. He also served as a deputy representative to the Storting, Norway's parliament, from Rogaland between 2005 and 2009.

== Civic career ==
In 2011 he was voted board member of the Norwegian Confederation of Sports, and in 2015 he was voted president. At the time he was the youngest person to hold the position. The start of his tenure was marked by the Oslo bid for the 2022 Winter Olympics, which was ultimately withdrawn prior to the selection of Beijing as the host city. He ran for re-election in 2019, but was defeated by Berit Kjøll.

In March 2021, he was elected leader of the Norwegian Association for the Handicapped.

== Personal life ==
Tvedt is married to fellow politician Kjersti Stenseng. He has a son and a daughter from a previous relationship, both of whom were born blind.

Tvedt played as a handball player through the 1990s prior to becoming mayor of Randaberg. He notably played over the course of 23 national championships during his handball career.

Political offices
Preceded by Olav Sande	Mayor of Randaberg Municipality; 1999–2007	Succeeded by Tone Tvedt Nybø
Preceded by Roald G. Bergsaker	County Mayor of Rogaland; 2007–2011	Succeeded by Janne Johnsen
Sporting positions
Preceded by Børre Rognlien	President of the Norwegian Confederation of Sports; 2015–2019	Succeeded by Berit Kjøll
