= Frithjof Jacobsen (sports official) =

Norwegian military officer and sports official

- Born: 31 October 1843; Vaage, Norway
- Died: 12 February 1921 (aged 77); Kristiania
- Occupations: Military officer Sports official
- Awards: Order of St. Olav; Order of the Sword

Frithjof Jacobsen (31 October 1843 – 12 February 1921) was a Norwegian military officer and sports official.

Jacobsen was born in Vaage Municipality to physician Nils Laurits Severin Jacobsen and Johanne Jørgensen. He married Severine Elisabeth Holst in 1876.

He graduated as military officer in 1865, was promoted lieutenant colonel in 1897, and colonel in 1901, commanding the Hallingdal Battalion from 1901 to 1908. He served as acting War Commissioner in Bodø from 1909 to 1910, and in Hamar from 1911 to 1916. From 1904 to 1906 he chaired the sports association Centralforeningen for utbredelse af idræt. He was decorated Knight, First Class of the Order of St. Olav in 1905, and was a Knight, First Class of the Order of the Sword. He died in Kristiania in 1921.

Sporting positions
Preceded by Thorvald Prydz	Chairman of Centralforeningen; 1904–1906	Succeeded by Oscar Sigvald Julius Strugstad
