= Norwegian Olympic and Paralympic Committee and Confederation of Sports =

National Paralympic Committee of Norway

- Country: Norway
- [[|]]
- Code: NOR
- Created: 15 March 1861
- Continental Association: EOC
- Headquarters: Oslo, Norway
- President: Zaineb Al-Samarai
- Secretary General: Else-Marthe Sørlie Lybekk (acting)
- Website: www.idrettsforbundet.no

Norwegian Olympic and Paralympic Committee and Confederation of Sports^{division: Idrett for funksjonshemmede}

National Paralympic Committee
- Country: Norway
- Code: NOR
- Created: 1 January 2008
- Continental association: EPC
- Website: idrettsforbundet.no/funksjonshemmede/

The Norwegian Olympic and Paralympic Committee and Confederation of Sports (Norwegian: Norges idrettsforbund og olympiske og paralympiske komité; NIF), commonly known as the Norwegian Sports Confederation (Norwegian: Norges idrettsforbund; IOC Code: NOR) is the umbrella organization for sport in Norway and the country's National Olympic Committee and National Paralympic Committee. It is the largest volunteering organization in Norway, with more than 2 million members and 12,000 sports clubs in 19 region confederations and 54 national federations. The current president is Zaineb Al-Samarai.

== History ==
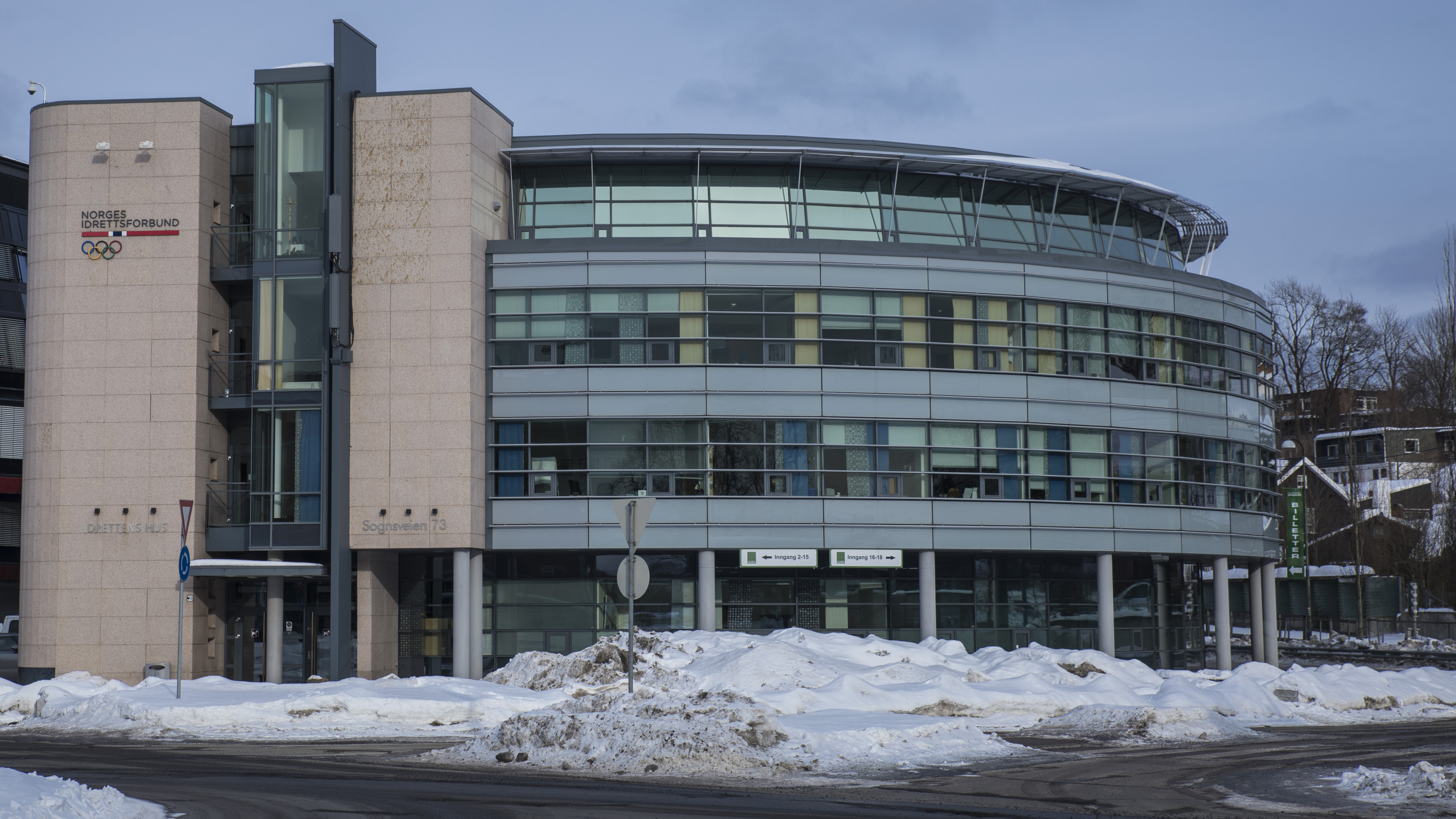
Headquarters of the Norwegian Confederation of Sports

The organisation was founded in 1861 as Centralforeningen for Udbredelse af Legemsøvelser og Vaabenbrug, and has later changed its name several times. The current name dates from 2007.

== Former presidents ==
The presidents before 1940:

=== Centralforeningen 1861–1910 ===
- 1861–1864 Otto Richard Kierulf
- 1864–1867 Nils Christian Irgens
- 1867–1869 Otto Richard Kierulf
- 1869–1878 Lars Broch
- 1878–1881 Lars Christian Dahll
- 1881–1885 Edvard Eriksen
- 1885–1887 Olaf Wilhelm Petersen
- 1887–1892 Anders Løwlie
- 1892–1902 Carl Sylow
- 1902–1904 Thorvald Prydz
- 1904–1906 Frithjof Jacobsen
- 1906–1916 Oscar Strugstad
- 1916–1919 Hans Daae

=== Norges Riksforbund for Idræt 1910–1919 ===
- 1910–1914 Johan Martens
- 1914–1918 Johan Sverre
- 1918–1919 Leif S. Rode

=== Norges Landsforbund for Idræt 1919–1940 ===
- 1919–1925 Hjalmar Krag
- 1925–1930 Leif S. Rode
- 1930–1932 Jørgen Martinius Jensen
- 1932–1936 Daniel Eie
- 1936–1940 Carl Christiansen

=== Arbeidernes Idrettsforbund 1924–1940 ===
- 1924–1926 Harald Liljedahl
- 1926–1927 Oscar Hansen
- 1927–1928 Thor Jørgensen
- 1928–1931 Thorvald Olsen
- 1931–1935 Trygve Lie
- 1935–1939 Arthur Ruud
- 1939–1940 Rolf Hofmo

=== Rød Sport 1931–1934 ===
- 1931– Oscar Hansen

=== During the German occupation of Norway ===
NLF and AIF were merged in September 1940, but the new organization was soon usurped by the Nazi authorities during the occupation of Norway by Nazi Germany.

- 1940–1940 Olaf Helset (deposed)
- 1940–1942 Egil Reichborn-Kjennerud
- 1942–1944 Charles Hoff

=== NIF 1946–1996 ===
- 1946–1948 Olaf Helset
- 1948–1951 Arthur Ruud
- 1961–1965 Axel Proet Høst
- 1965–1967 Johan Chr. Schønheyder
- 1967–1973 Torfinn Bentzen
- 1973–1984 Ole Jacob Bangstad
- 1984–1990 Hans B. Skaset
- 1990–1994 William Engseth
- 1994–1996 Arne Myhrvold

=== Norges Olympiske Komite 1965–1996 ===
- 1965–1969 Jørgen Jahre
- 1969–1985 Arne B. Mollén
- 1985–1989 Jan Gulbrandsen
- 1989–1996 Arne Myhrvold

=== Norges Idrettsforbund og Olympiske Komite 1996–2007 ===
- 1996–1999 Arne Myhrvold
- 1999–2004 Kjell Olav Kran
- 2004–2004 Grethe Fossli (acting)
- 2004–2007 Karl-Arne Johannessen
- 2007–2007 Odd-Roar Thorsen (acting)
- 2007–2007 Tove Paule

=== Norges Idrettsforbund og Olympiske og Paralympiske Komite 2007– ===
- 2007–2011 Tove Paule
- 2011–2015 Børre Rognlien
- 2015–2019 Tom Tvedt
- 2019–2023 Berit Kjøll
- 2023– Zaineb Al-Samarai

== See also ==
- Olympiatoppen
- Norway at the Olympics
- Norway at the Paralympics
