= Østfold Workers' Sports Association =

Norwegian sporting association

- Abbreviation: Østfold AIK
- Formation: 27 October 1927; 98 years ago
- Founded at: Østfold, Norway
- Type: Sporting organisation
- Headquarters: Sarpsborg
- Region served: Østfold
- Parent organization: Workers Federation of Sports (Arbeidernes Idrettsforbund)

The Østfold Workers' Sports Association (Norwegian: Østfold Arbeideridrettskrets, often abbreviated to Østfold AIK), founded 23 October 1927, was a sporting association from Østfold in Norway. It was one of many regional associations within the Workers Federation of Sports (AIF).

== Member clubs of Østfold AIK ==
Within the Østfold AIK there were many clubs:

| Club | Place | Formed | Joined AIK | What happened after World War II |
|---|---|---|---|---|
| Arbeidernes Atletklubb | Tistedalen | | | |
| Arbeidernes Brevdueklubb | Moss | | | |
| Arbeidernes Båtforening | Moss | | | |
| Arbeidernes Miniaturskytterlag | Askim | | | |
| Arbeidernes Miniaturskytterlag | Sarpsborg | | | |
| Arbeidernes Motorklubb | Askim | | | |
| Arbeidernes Sjakklubb | Halden | | 1936 | |
| Arbeidernes Sjakklubb | Fredrikstad | | | |
| Arbeidernes Sjakklubb 1933 | Moss | 1933 | 1936 | |
| Arbeidernes Sjakklubb | Sarpsborg | | | |
| Arbeidernes Skøyteklubb | Moss | | | |
| Arbeidernes Svømmeklubb | Moss | | | |
| Arbeidernes Tennisklubb | Sarpsborg | | | |
| Askim AIL | Askim | | | Merged with Askim Idrettsforening in 1940. |
| Askim Sjakklubb | Askim | | | |
| Blink Miniaturskytterlag | Skjeberg | | | |
| Borge AIL | Borge | | | |
| Borge Arbeidersjakklubb | Borge | | | |
| Borgen AIL | Sarpsborg | 1927 | | Still exists as Borgen Idrettslag. |
| AIL Brand | Sarpsborg | 1934 | | |
| Drott Sykkelklubb | Mysen | | | |
| Fagforeningens Skytterlag | Fredrikstad | | | |
| Framkameratene | Moss | | | |
| AIL Fremad | Borge | 1929 | 1929 | Renamed Borgar IL in 1947. |
| Gresvik Sjakklubb | Gressvik | | | |
| Greåker Atletklubb | Greåker | | | |
| Halden AIL | Halden | | | |
| Herulf Turn og IL | Moss | | | |
| Hoppern Skiklubb | Moss | | | Merged with SK Sprint-Jeløy in 1947. |
| Hvidsten Sjakklubb | Borge | | | |
| Jeløy Idrettsforening | Moss | 1926 | 1928 | Merged with Sprint in 1940 to form SK Sprint-Jeløy. |
| Kambo AIL | Kambo | 1936 | 1936 | Renamed Kambo IL. |
| Kirkøy AIL | Kirkeøy | | | |
| Krapfoss Skytterlag | Moss | | | |
| Lahelle Sjakklubb | Lahelle | | | |
| Moss Atletklubb | Moss | | | |
| Moss Skytterlag | Moss | | | |
| Mysen AIL | Mysen | | | Became part of Mysen Idrettsforening in 1945. |
| Møklegård Salonglag | Fredrikstad | | | |
| Møllearbeidernes Bedriftsidrettslag | Moss | | | |
| AIL Orion | Halden | | | |
| Osdalen AIL | Halden | | | |
| Rakkestad AIL | Rakkestad | | | |
| AIL Rapid | Moss | 1925 | | Merged with Athens in 2011 to form Rapid Athens. |
| AIL Robust | Fredrikstad | | | |
| Rolvsøy AIL | Rolvsøy | | | |
| Rolvsøy IF | Rolvsøy | 1920 | 1938 | Still exists. |
| Råde AIL | Råde | | | |
| Skjeberg AIL | Skjeberg | 1930 | | Merged with Skjeberg Skiklubb in 1945 to form Skjeberg Sportsklubb. |
| AIL Sparta | Sarpsborg | 1928 | | Still exists. |
| Brevdueklubben Speed | Fredrikstad | | | |
| Sportsklubben Sprint | Moss | 1926 | 1927 | Merged with Jeløy in 1940 to form SK Sprint-Jeløy. |
| Spydeberg AIL | Spydeberg | | | |
| AIL Stjernen | Fredrikstad | 1935 | | Still exists as the Idrettslaget Stjernen. |
| Sundløkken Sjakklubb | Fredrikstad | | 1936 | |
| Torsnes Fotballklubb | Torsnes | | | |
| Tveter AIL | Sarpsborg | 1934 | | Renamed Tveter IL. |
| Ullerød IL | Skjeberg | | | |
| Sportsklubben Uredd | Fredrikstad | 1925 | | Was merged with Stjernen in 1947. |
| IL Ørnulf | Sarpsborg | | | Merged with Sarpsborg Idrettslag in 1964. |
| Østsiden AIL | Fredrikstad | 1935 | | Renamed Østsiden IL in 1945 |

== Football ==
In football, Østfold AIK was the leading club within the AIF. Two Østfold teams, Sprint and Sparta, won 9 of the 16 AIF national football championships held between 1924 and 1939.

Østfold AIK occasionally selected a combined football team to play international matches, such as 27 August 1937 when they played the Basque Country.

== Post World War 2 ==
In 1945 Østfold Workers' Sports Association merged with Østfold Distriktslag for Idrett to form Østfold Idrettskrets.

== Club Chairmen ==
- Ola Johan Brandstorp (1927–1929)
- Thorstein Guldberg, Borgen (1931)
- Hermod Arnulf, Sparta (1933–1934)
- Hans Thorvaldsen, Sarpsborg (1935–1936)
- Torkil Samuelsen, Moss (1937–1939)
