= Thomas Edvard von Westen Sylow =

Norwegian politician

Thomas Edvard von Westen Sylow (3 August 1792 – 20 December 1875) was the Norwegian Minister of the Army 1848–1852 and 1852–1853, and member of the Council of State Division in Stockholm 1851–1852 and 1853–1854.

Sylow was the father of mathematician Peter Ludwig Mejdell Sylow and military officer and sports official Carl Sylow.
