= Anders Løwlie =

Norwegian Businessman & Sports Official

- Born: 6 April 1843; Romedal, Norway
- Died: 9 March 1924 (aged 80); Oslo
- Occupations: Businessman; Sports official
- Awards: Order of St. Olav

Anders Jensen Løwlie (6 April 1843 – 9 March 1924) was a Norwegian businessman and sports official.

Løwlie was born in Romedal Municipality to farmer and blacksmith Jens Helgesen Løvlien and Randi Olsdatter Skee, and married Oline Augusta Jacobsen in 1877. He was manager of the distillery Løiten Brænderi from 1865, and of Kristiania Brændevinssamlag from 1886. Løwlie played a central role in development of the recipe for Løiten Akvavit, based on caraway from Dovre.

From 1887 to 1892 he chaired the sports association Centralforeningen for utbredelse af idræt.

He was a decorated Knight, First Class of the Order of St. Olav in 1901. He died in Oslo in 1924.

Sporting positions
| Preceded by Olaf Wilhelm Petersen | Chairman of Centralforeningen; 1887–1892 | Succeeded by Carl Sylow |
