= Johan Sverre (sports official) =

Norwegian military officer and sports official

Johan Tidemann Sverre (7 October 1867 – 6 June 1934) was a Norwegian military officer and sports official.

== Personal life ==
He was born in Fredrikstad as a son of Erik Olsen (1831–1918) and Josefine Andrea Nicolaysen (1839–1899), and brother of Ole Sverre. He changed his last name from Olsen to Sverre in May 1892.

In September 1893 in Fredrikstad he married Elna Jacobsen (1870–1958), a daughter of Julius Nicolai Jacobsen. The marriage lasted until January 1917. In February 1919 in Paris he married Gudny Thaulow, formerly married Bonnevie.

== Career ==
He lived in Fredrikstad until 1887, when he moved to Kristiania to attend Aars og Voss School. He took the examen artium there in 1888, then graduated from the Norwegian Military Academy in 1891 and the Norwegian Military College in 1894. He also took the Central School of Gymnastics from 1895 to 1896 and the Artillery' School of Riding from 1901 to 1902.

He had a military career, as premier lieutenant from 1891. He served interchangeably in Akershus Infantry Brigade and Trondhjem Infantry Brigade. He served in the Artillery from 1895, and headed its petty officer's school from 1911. He was promoted to captain in 1898, major in 1915 and lieutenant colonel in 1926. He was an aide-de-camp for Crown Prince Gustaf Adolf of Sweden and Norway from 1904 until the dissolution of the union between Norway and Sweden in 1905, and served as military attaché to France from 1917 to 1921.

He started practising sports in his hometown, and was a gymnast in Fredrikstad TF and rower in Fredrikstad RK. After 1887 he was an active rower in several Kristiania-based clubs. He was a co-founder of Norske Studenters RK and chaired the club from 1897 to 1907. The club was first based at Vippetangen, and from 1903 in Frognerkilen near "Dronningen" at Bygdøy. He was also deputy chairman of the Centralforeningen for Idræt. In 1907 he was chosen as the new chairman of the gymnastic club Christiania TF, which he led until 1912. In 1911 he became president of the Norwegian Gymnastics Federation.

He chaired the confederation of sports, the Norges Riksforbund for Idræt from 1914 to 1918, having been vice president since 1912. He was also the Norwegian squad leader and administrator for the 1906, 1908 and 1912 Olympic Games. From 1908 to 1927 he served as Norway's member of the International Olympic Committee. Sverre was also admitted into the exclusive skiing-based social club SK Ull in 1896. He died in June 1934 in Oslo.

Sporting positions
Preceded by Thomas Heftye	Norway's member of the International Olympic Committee; 1908–1927	Succeeded by Thomas Fearnley
Preceded by Johan Martens	Chairman of the Norges Riksforbund for Idræt; 1914–1918	Succeeded by Leif Rode
