= Jan Gulbrandsen =

- Born: 29 May 1938; Oslo, Norway
- Died: 4 September 2007 (aged 69)
- Occupations: Politician and sports official
- Known for: National champion and Olympic competitor in hurdles

Jan Gulbrandsen (29 May 1938 – 4 September 2007) was a Norwegian hurdler, politician and sports official.

His main event was the 400 metres hurdles. He became Norwegian champion in the event from 1957 through 1964, and won a silver medal in 1965. He held the Norwegian record between 1958 and 1960, with 51.5 as the best time, achieved in 1964. His best electronic time was 52.40 seconds. He competed in 400 metres hurdles at the 1960 Summer Olympics in Rome, but was knocked out in the semi-final. At both the 1958 and 1962 European Championships he was knocked out in the heats.

In the 110 metres hurdles he became Norwegian champion in 1960, 1961 and 1962 before the rivals Weum/Fimland started their more-than-decade-long dominance. Gulbrandsen also won national silver medals in 110 metres hurdles in 1957, 1958, 1959, 1963 and 1964. His personal best time was 14.5 seconds, achieved in 1962. In the sprint/running distances he had 22.5 in the 200 metres (1959), 49.1 in the 400 metres (1958) and 1:51.9 in the 800 metres (1960). He also had 6.81 metres in the long jump (1958) and 14.29 in the triple jump (1956). With these diverse abilities he also became Norwegian pentathlon and decathlon champion in 1959. He scored his personal bests the same year; 3.556 points and 6.551 points respectively. He held Norwegian records in both events until 1962, when both were overtaken by Hans B. Skaset. Gulbrandsen also had a record in the 4 x 400 metres relay with the national team. From 1960 to 1965 he was a national team coach. He represented the club SK Vidar.

He was a department director at the Norwegian School of Sport Sciences from 1968 to 1973. From 1974 to 1975 he was a State Secretary in the Ministry of the Environment as a part of Labour's Bratteli Cabinet. He was later director of park and sports in Oslo Municipality from 1977 to 1984, and from 1985 to 1989 he was the managing director of the Norwegian Automobile Federation and president of the Norwegian Olympic Committee.
