= Sverre Haugli =

Sverre Haugli may refer to:

- Sverre Ingolf Haugli (1925–1986), Norwegian speed skater
- Sverre Haugli (born 1982), Norwegian speed skater
