= Ulrich Anton Schønheyder =

Danish naval officer and colonial administrator

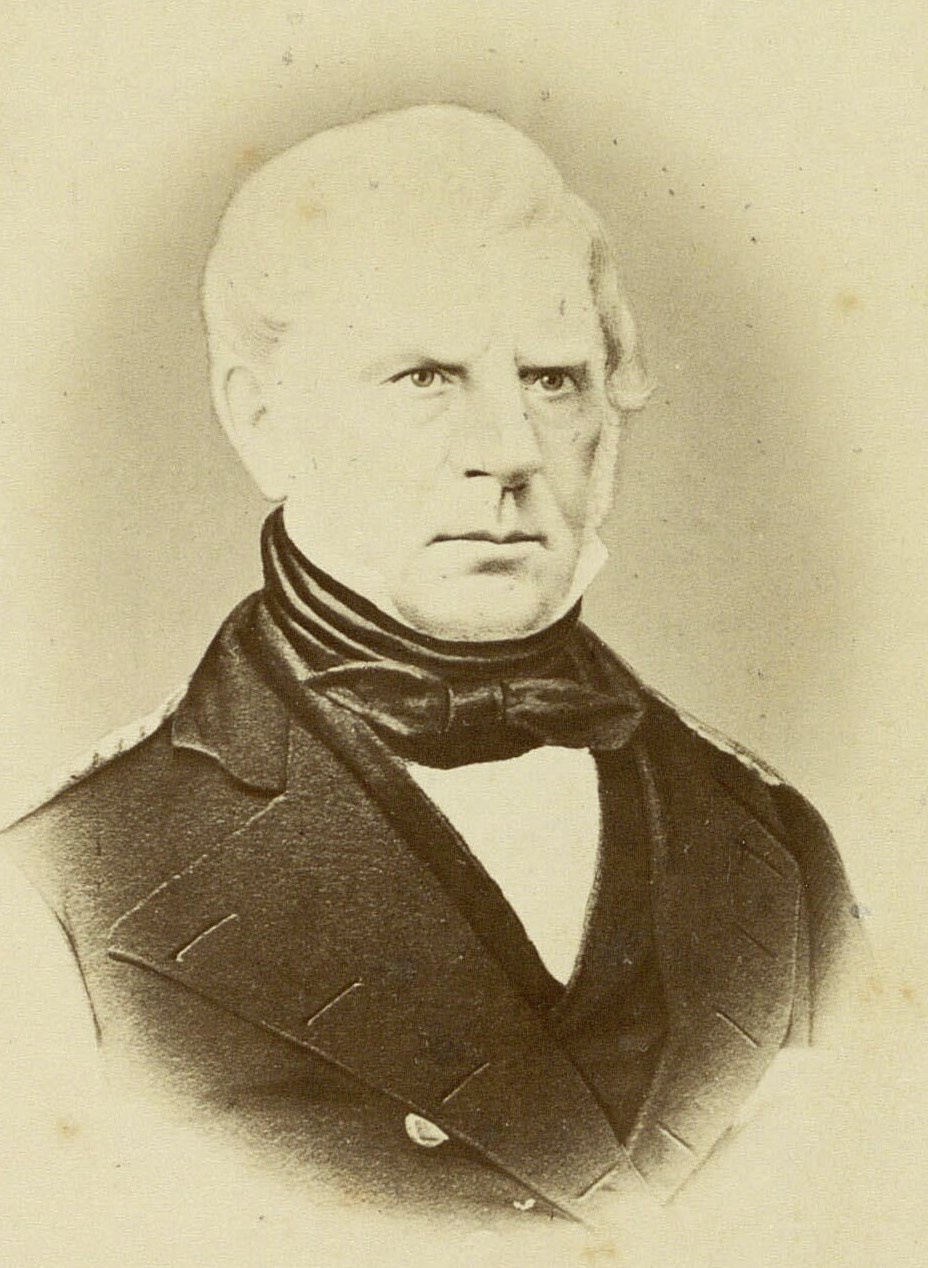
- Picture of Ulrich Anton Schønheyder

38th Governor of Tranquebar
- In office 1823–1825
- Monarch: Frederick VII
- Preceded by: Jens Kofoed
- Succeeded by: Hans de Brinck-Seidelin

Personal details
- Born: 22 June 1775 Sokkelund, Copenhagen, Denmark
- Died: 21 April 1858 (aged 82) Sokkelund, Copenhagen, Denmark
- Spouse: Christiane Clausine Hansen
- Children: Vilhelmine Henriette Schønheyder; Antonia Augusta Schønheyder; Gottlieb Peter Schønheyder; Christian Vilhelm Schønheyder
- Parent(s): Johan Christian Schønheyder; Christiane Clausine Hansen

Military service
- Allegiance: Denmark-Norway 1793–1814; Denmark 1814–1846
- Rank: Admiral
- Battles/wars: Gunboat War

Admiral Ulrich Anton Schønheyder (22 June 1775 – 21 April 1858) was a Danish naval officer and colonial administrator.

== Early life ==
Schønheyder was born on 22 June 1775 in Copenhagen. His father was pastor of Trinitatis Church and later bishop in Norway Johan Christian Schønheyder. His mother was Charlotte Reinholdine von Jessen (1750–1784). He had five brothers and two sisters. His father was after the mother's death married to Joachime Catharine Benzon (1757-1836).

== Career ==
Schønheyder became a junior lieutenant in 1793, a senior lieutenant in 1798, captain lieutenant in 1808, captain in 1812, commander captain in 1817 and commodore in 1824, counter admiral in 1834. After his retirement from active service in 1846, he was awarded the rank of vice admiral in 1848 and full admiral in 1851.

In 1802–7, Schønheyder served in the naval surveying. In 1808–11, he headed a flotilla of gunboats and similar vessels at Funen. He captured a number of British ships. In 1808, after having been sent to Holstein to transfer French soldiers, he captured the British brig Tigress. In September, he captured a British gunboat in the Great Belt. In 1809. he also captured a group of British sailors on Rømø and drove off the frigate HMS Penelope.

In 1811–12, Schønheyder briefly served as commandant of Christiansø. Shortly thereafter, he was transferred to the naval defense of Norway, took command of the brig Allart, and harried enemy frigates and convoys . At the end of the war he was awarded a sum of 11,000 rigsdaler in prize money.

In 1815–18, as commander of the brig Bornholm, he was initially sent to the Mediterranean where he concluded a peace treaty with Tripoli. He then continued to the Danish West Indies where he strengthened the defence of the islands through the acquisition of the schooners Macaria and St. Thomas.

Back in Copenhagen, on 17 October 1822, he was appointed as interim governor of Tranquebar. He departed from Copenhagen on 7 November on board the Nymphen and arrived in Tranquebar on 6 June 1923. He was dismissed on 8 May 1924. In October, he was in Calcutta. He left the post as governor on 7 March 1825. He returned to Copenhagen on 23 March by way of Madras and England.

In 1829, he was appointed as 3rd Member (3. Deputeret og 1834 2. Deputeret) in the admiralty college. He was the same year appointed as commander of the ship of the line Dronning Marie. In 1833, he was appointed as director of the Royal Danish Naval Hospital in Copenhagen. He remained in both positions until the end of his active service in 1846.

== Personal life ==
Schønheyder was married on 10 April 1814 to Christiane Clausine Hansen (1792-1859). She was the daughter of bishop Peder Hansen (1746-1810) and Abeline Marie Marie Clausen (1752-1796). They were parents of two daughters and two sons. The younger of the two sons Christian Wilhelm Schønheyder (1820-1877) joined the navy where he reached the rank of commodore. The younger of the two daughters Antonia Augusta Schønheyder (1816-1885) married the naval officer Oluf Vilhelm Wilhelm de Fine Skibsted (1714-1781).

Schønheyder and his wife resided at Kronprinsessegade 40 in Copenhagen at the 1840 census. Schønheyder's elder brother, Johan Franciscus Gottlieb Schønheyder (1773-1850), director of Rentekammeret, lived a few houses down the street at Kronprinsessegade 28.

Schønheyder died on 21 April 1858.

== Awards ==
On 11 June 1824, Schønheyder was created a Commander of the Order of the Dannebrog. He was awarded its Grand Cross in 1841.
