= Ludvig Sylow =

Ludvig Sylow may refer to:

- Peter Ludvig Sylow (1832–1918), Norwegian mathematician
- Ludvig Sylow (DBU) (1861–1933), Danish football executive
