= Kampforbundet for Rød Sportsenhet =

Norwegian sporting organization

Kampforbundet for Rød Sportsenhet ('Struggle League for Red Sports Unity') was a sporting organization in Norway. It was colloquially known as Rød sport. It was founded by the Communist Party of Norway in 1931 (95 years ago), in reaction to the decision of the Arbeidernes Idrettsforbund (AIF, 'Workers Sports League') to leave the Red Sports International (Sportintern). The organization was re-unified with AIF in 1934 (92 years ago), as a result of negotiations between AIF and Sportintern in Moscow. During its peak, Rød sport had around 4,000–5,000 members.

== Split in AIF ==
In Norway, the followers of the Norwegian Labour Party and Communist Party had cohabited in the sporting movement after the two parties split in 1923. However, at its national conference in May 1931 AIF decided to withdraw from Sportintern, in response to an ultimatum from Sportintern to break all links to the Labour Party.

The communists reacted by founding Kampforbundet for Rød Sportsenhet at a meeting at the facilities of the sports club SK Sleipner in Oslo, in late May 1931. The former AIF chairman Oskar Hansen was elected as chairman of the new organization. The organization proclaimed to work for unity between AIF and Sportintern.

A debate emerged at the founding meeting, whether Workers' Defense Corps should be formed within the framework of the organization. This proposal was supported by the Communist Party chairman Henry W. Kristiansen. However, the conference decided not to form paramilitary units, stating that such groups should have a separate organization of their own.

== First olive branch ==
In 1933, the organization made an offer to the (much larger) AIF to cooperate with the logistics surrounding the reception of a Soviet sports' team. In April and May 1933, a new round of negotiations between AIF and Rød sport took place. The two agreed that AIF would allow the re-entry of expelled Rød sport clubs into AIF whilst Rød sport agreed to accept the cooperation between AIF and the Norwegian Trade Union Confederation. However, they could not agree on the issue of links to the Labour Party. Following internal consultations and recommendations from the Communist Party and Sportintern, the agreement that the Rød sport negotiating team had accepted was rejected.

== Invitation of Soviet boxers ==
A new round of negotiations and disputes took place in the preparations of a visit of Soviet boxers. Rød sport demanded that half of the earnings of the ticket sales should go to supporting the workers' sports movement in Germany, whilst AIF wanted earnings to go to a Labour Party-controlled fund for political refugees. Negotiations broke down, and in the end the Soviet boxing team only participated in events organized by Rød sport.

== Reunification ==
In 1934, reunification with AIF was finally achieved, following meetings between AIF and Soviet sport authorities in Moscow. The reunification can be seen as an early expression of the popular front line. AIF existed until 1940.
