= Johan Chr. Schønheyder =

Norwegian orienteer

- Born: 12 February 1915; Kristiania, Norway
- Died: 14 March 2015 (aged 100)
- Occupations: Insurance manager; Sports administrator
- Parent: Johan Franciscus Schønheyder

Johan Chr. Schønheyder (12 February 1915 – 14 March 2015) was a Norwegian insurance manager, orienteer and sports official.

== Personal life ==
Schønheyder was born in Kristiania to engineer Johan Franciscus Schønheyder and Anna Kristine Schjold. He married Anne Lise Gulsrud in 1941, and resided in Bærum.

== Career ==
Schønheyder chaired Norges Orienteringsforbund from 1948 to 1953, and the Norwegian Confederation of Sports from 1965 to 1967. He competed for the Norwegian national orienteering team at the international match between Norway and Sweden in 1939. He was a board member of Norsk Tipping from 1966 to 1970.

Sporting positions
Preceded by Axel Proet Høst	Chairman of the Norwegian Confederation of Sports; 1965–1967	Succeeded by Torfinn Bentzen
