= Johan Franciscus Schønheyder =

Norwegian ships engineer

- Born: 25 August 1879; Christiania, Norway
- Died: 4 December 1968 (aged 89)
- Occupation: Ships engineer
- Children: Johan Chr. Schønheyder
- Awards: Order of Vasa

Johan Franciscus Schønheyder (25 August 1879 – 4 December 1968) was a Norwegian ships engineer.

== Personal life ==
Schønheyder was born in Christiania to stipendiary magistrate Didrik Christian Sommerschild Schønheyder and Marie Katinka Maurer. He married Anna Kristine Schjold in 1914. He was the father of Johan Chr. Schønheyder.

== Career ==
Schønheyder studied engineering in Kristiania and Hannover. He worked as ships engineer in Glasgow and Trondheim, and was assigned at the Ministry of Trade from 1918 to 1949. From 1949 to 1953 he worked for Nortraship. He was decorated Knight, First Class of the Swedish Order of Vasa.
