= Johan Christian Schønheyder =

Danish-Norwegian priest

Right Reverend Johan Christian Schønheyder
- Bishop
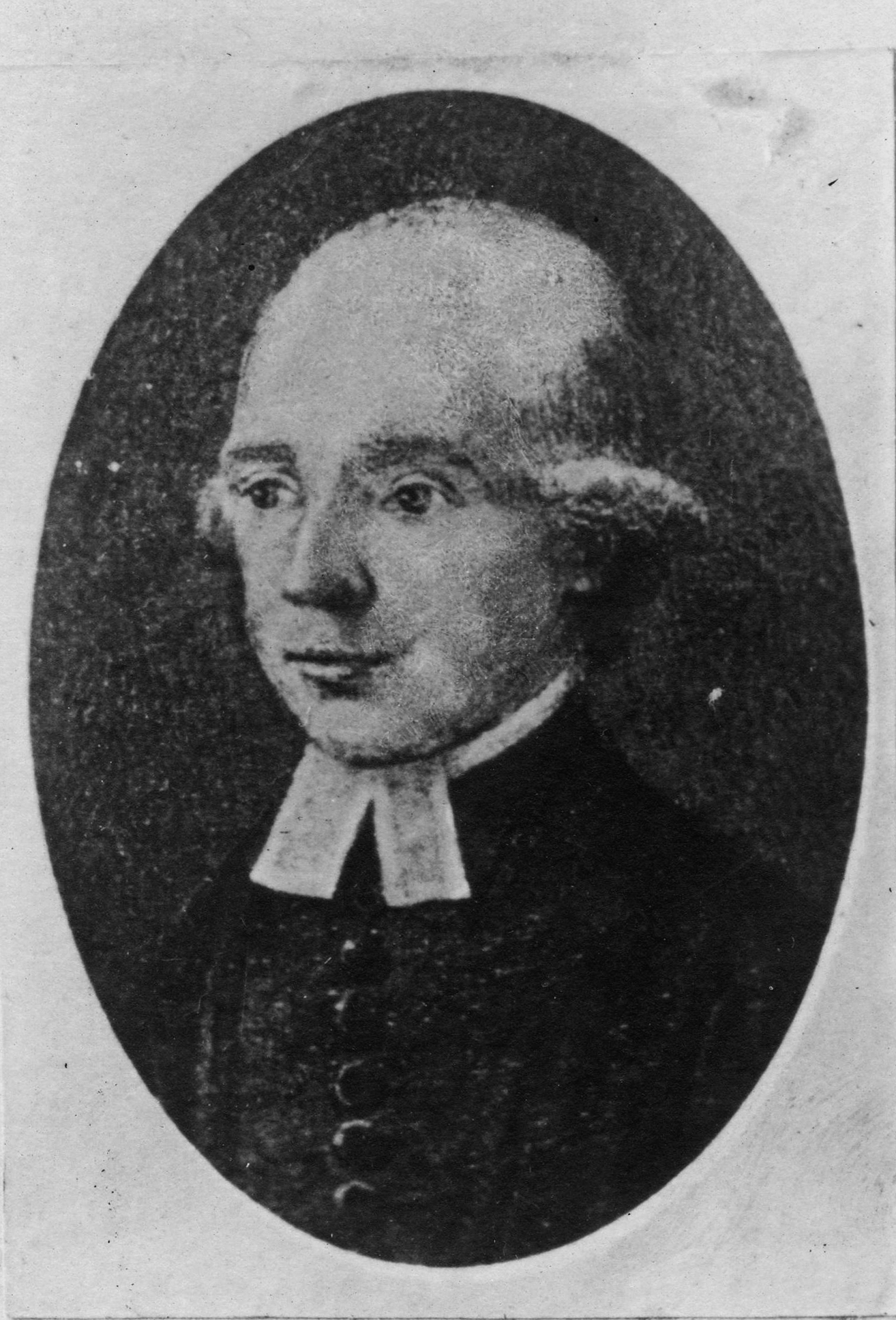
- Church: Church of Norway
- Diocese: Nidaros

Personal details
- Born: 9 August 1742 Copenhagen, Denmark
- Died: 14 April 1803 (aged 60) Trondheim, Norway
- Denomination: Christian
- Parents: Johan Franciscus Gottlieb Schønheyder; Mette Mossin
- Spouse: Charlotta Reinholdina von Jessen (1772-1784); Joachime Cathrine Bentzon (1785-1803)
- Occupation: Priest

Johan Christian Schønheyder (9 August 1742 – 14 April 1803) was a Danish-Norwegian priest. He was the bishop of the Diocese of Trondhjem from 1788 until 1803. He was the father of Danish naval officer Ulrich Anton Schønheyder.

== Early life and education ==
Schønheyder was born on 9 August 1742 in Copenhagen, Denmark. His father was surgeon Schønheyder (1701–77). He moved to Denmark from Germany in 1728. Schønheyder's mother was Mette Hansdatter Mossin (1713-1766). He had nine siblings. His brothers included the medical doctor Johan Henrich Schønheyder (1744-1831) and the Supreme Court attorney Johan Martin Schønheyder (1752-1831).

Schønheyder graduated in theology from the University of Copenhagen in 1760, followed by studies in Germany from 1765 to 1768.

== Career ==
Schønheyder traveled with King Christian VII of Denmark as royal priest on a tour through Germany, Netherlands, United Kingdom and France from May 1768 to January 1769. In 1769 he became the pastor of Christiansborg Palace in Denmark, and then in 1771 he became the vicar of Trinitatis Church in Copenhagen. He kept this position until 1782 when he became a dean and parish priest of the Church of Our Lady (Vor Frue Kirke) in Copenhagen at 40 years old.

In 1788 he was appointed the bishop of the Diocese of Nidaros, which encompassed all of Northern Norway. He held this position until his death in 1803. He was the last Bishop over all of northern Norway, since the northernmost parts were separated to form a new diocese in 1804.

== Personal life ==
Schønheyder married on 21 February 1772 to Charlotte Reinholdine von Jessen (1750–1784). She was a daughter of General-Landets-Oeconomi- og Commerce-Collegium member (kommiteret) Johan Frederik Wilhelm von Jessen (1709-1768, ennobled in 1754) and Ulrica Antonietta Böhne Nissen (1716-1788). Eight of their nine children—six sons and two daughters—reached adulthood. Their eldest son Johan Franciscus Gottlieb Schønheyder (1773-1850) was a high-ranking Danish civil servant Supreme Court justice. The third-eldest son Ulrich Anton Schønheyder (1775-1858) was a Danish naval officer. Two of their other sons became priests, one in Denmark and one in Norway.

Scgønheyder was after his wife's death secondly married to Joachime Catharine Benzon (1757-1836). She was the daughter of pastor in Hbvidbjerg Laurids Kiærulff Benzon (1720-1750= and Johanne Marie Poulson (1725-1793).

Church of Norway
Preceded by Marcus Fredrik Bang	Bishop of Trondhjem; 1788–1803	Succeeded by Peder Olivarius Bugge
