= Karl-Arne Johannessen =

Norwegian physician, health administrator and sports official

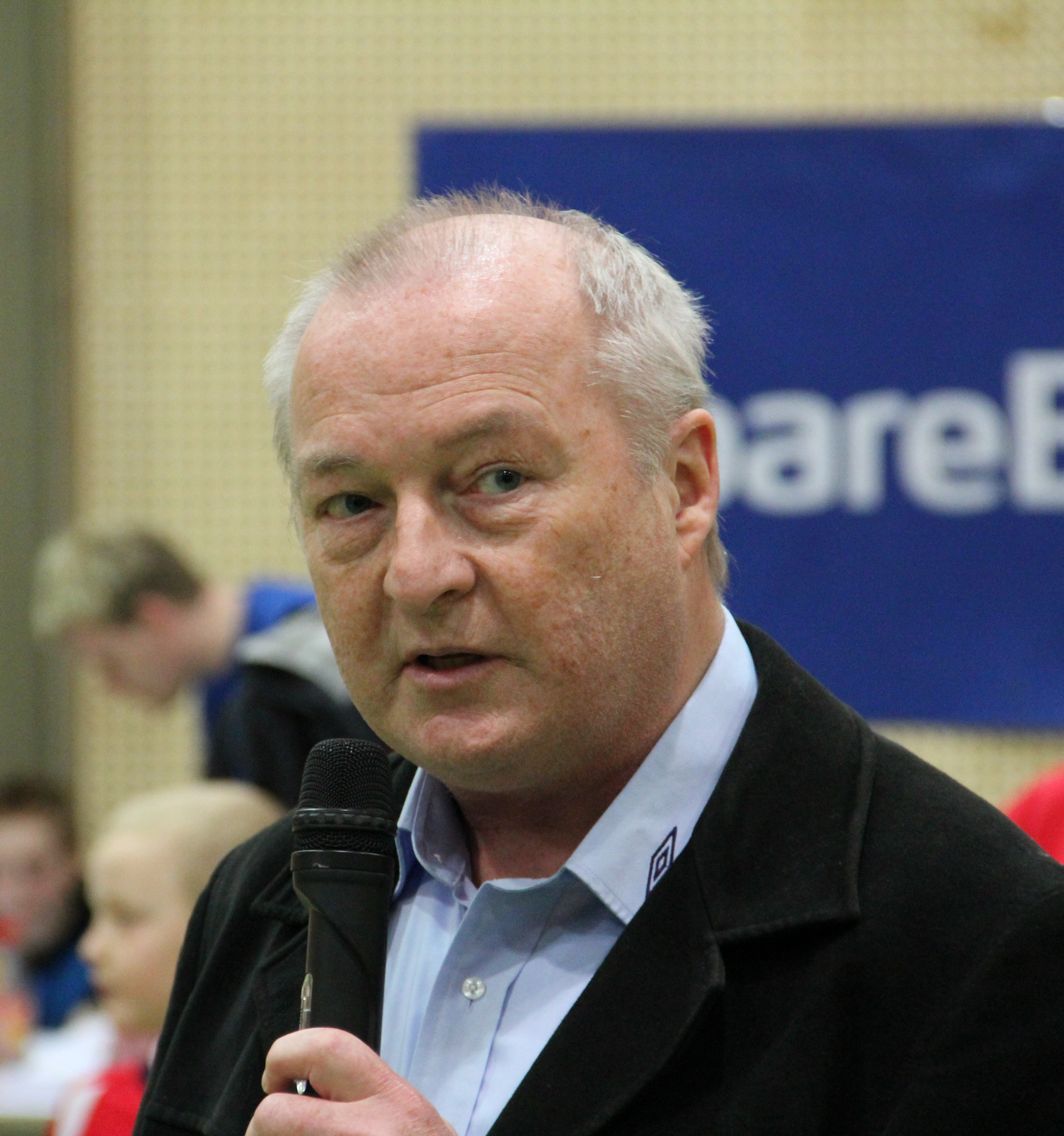
Karl-Arne Johannessen

Karl-Arne Johannessen (born 30 June 1952) is a Norwegian physician, health administrator and sports official. He was president of the Norwegian Handball Federation from 1999 to 2004, and the Norwegian Olympic Committee and Confederation of Sports from 2004 to 2007.

He was also Norwegian Handball Federation for a second period, from 2009 to 2015.
