= Kjell Olav Kran =

Norwegian business administrator and sports official

Kjell Olav Kran (born 10 August 1937) is a Norwegian business administrator and sports official.

He was CEO of Sparebanken NOR from 1990 to 1999, and chairman of the board of Statoil from 1996 to 1999. He was president of the Norwegian Olympic Committee and Confederation of Sports from 1999 to 2004.

== Sports career ==
Kran was an active handball player in his younger days, playing in the Norwegian handball league and the Swiss league. As junior he also won National junior championships in tennis and was selected to the National youth bandy team.

Sporting positions
Preceded by Arne Myhrvold	President of the Norwegian Confederation of Sports; 1999–2004	Succeeded by Grethe Fossli (acting)
Business positions
Preceded by Arnfinn Hofstad (acting)	Chairman of Statoil; 1996–1999	Succeeded by Ole Lund
