= Workers Federation of Sports =

Former Norwegian sporting organization

Workers' Federation of Sports (Arbeidernes Idrettsforbund)
- Abbreviation: AIF
- Formation: 1924; 102 years ago
- Founded at: Oslo, Norway
- Type: Sporting organisation
- Headquarters: Oslo
- Region served: Norway

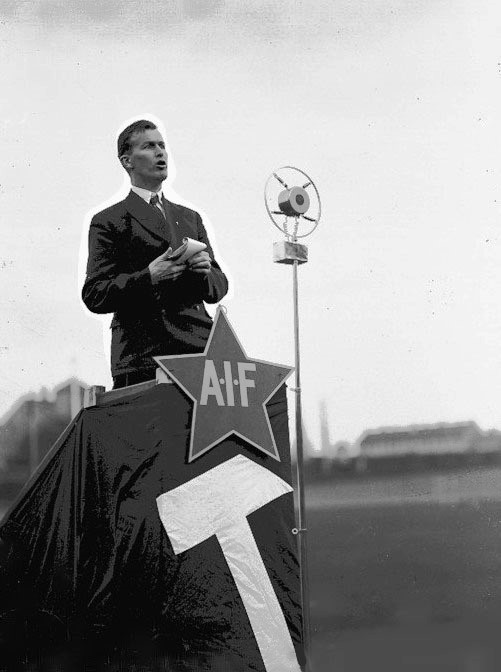

The Workers' Federation of Sports (Norwegian: Arbeidernes Idrettsforbund), often just called the AIF, was a sporting organization in Norway (mostly out of Norway) between 1924 and 1946. As of 1935, AIF had around 50,000 members. AIF published the magazine Arbeideridrett. Several Sweden-based sports organizations were members of the AIF sports union.

In 1930 to fight the international political blockade against the Soviet Union, AIF invited the Soviet Union national football team which toured Norway and Sweden in summer of 1930.

== Foundation and early growth ==
The first explicit workers' sports club in Norway was Arbeidernes TIF, founded in 1909 and renamed to Fagforeningernes TIF in 1916. In the 1920s, the Norwegian Wrestling Federation banned fifteen members of this club for taking part in a "politicized" wrestling meet where "The Internationale" was played. This helped spur the creation of a workers' federation of sports, although a Workers' Sports Opposition (Norwegian: Arbeidernes Idrettsopposisjon) had existed since 1922.

The decision to found AIF was taken (with 51 votes against 4) at the third national conference of the Workers' Sports Opposition in Folkets Hus in Oslo on June 8 and 9, 1924. Harald Liljedahl was elected as chairman of AIF, with 29 votes against 9 for Olaf Thorsen (a communist and executive member of the Red Sport International). The conference unanimously decided to appeal for membership in the Red Sport International.

AIF grew rapidly. Initially an Oslo-based movement, AIF began forming clubs in different parts of the country. At the time of its foundation, the organization had affiliated clubs with a combined membership of 4,810. By the end of the year, it had 85 sports teams and a combined membership of 5,686. In 1925, AIF had 96 sports teams and a combined membership of 6,608. The stronghold was still Oslo and Akershus, whereas Sogn og Fjordane did not have a single workers' sports club.

== Political complications ==
The foundation of AIF was not met with complete enthusiasm in the Norwegian Labour Party. Trygve Lie opposed the idea of having a politicized sporting organization. The national party conference of 1925 did however decide that the party would back the new organization, rejecting Lie's criticism.

At the AIF national conference of 1926, the communist and trade unionist Oskar Hansen was elected as new chairman with 56 votes against 31 for Rolf Hofmo. The new AIF board was dominated by communists.

Political contradictions intensified in AIF after the Labour Party reunified with the Social Democratic Labour Party of Norway in 1927. The merger conference, the unified party declared that it would continue to support AIF but that their support was condition with the 'end to Communist Party cell activity' in AIF. At the AIF national conference in April 1927 the incumbent AIF leadership was severely criticized. The communist candidate for chairman, Kristoffer Mikkelsen, was defeated. The Labour Party-supported Thor Jørgensen was elected chairman, with 68 votes against 42 for Mikkelsen.

== Oslo Winter Spartakiad ==
The timing of the political shift in AIF was problematic for the Red Sport International, as AIF was due to host the Winter Spartakiad in February 1928. The Winter Spartakiad was however held in Oslo, in a grand fashion, co-organized by AIF and the Red Sport International. However, the attempts by the Labour Party-wing of AIF to tone down the propagandistic character of the event was severely disliked by the Red Sport International, and the Winter Spartakiad marked a deterioration of the relations between the two bodies.

== Communist come-back ==
At the April 1928 national conference, the communists decided to launch Thorvald Olsen. Olsen, a national wrestling champion, was a Labour Party member but seen as more sympathetic towards the Red Sport International. In the election, Olsen defeated the incumbent Jørgensen. Moreover, the communist managed to get their party comrade Johs. Mortensen elected as editor of Arbeideridrett. Five out of ten members of the new board were communists.

In the spring of 1929, Ola Brandstorp wrote an article in Den Røde Ungdom where he suggested that AIF would withdraw from the Red Sport International. The article sparked a debate, and at a Red Sport International executive meeting in Kharkiv (in which Brandstorp participated) he was ordered to resign from the executive committee. AIF interpreted this move as an ultimatum. The November 1929 AIF national conference voted in favour of retaining membership in the Red Sport International, but demanding that the International would not interfere in the links between AIF and the Labour Party and Norwegian Trade Union Confederation. According to the decision passed at the conference, AIF became subordinated to these two bodies. Brandstorp was elected new editor of Arbeideridrett.

== Split and Labour Party hegemony ==
The communist sector of AIF began to organize itself an oppositional tendency, and had direct links with the Red Sport International. The AIF national conference of May 1931 decided that AIF withdrew from the Red Sport International. Trygve Lie was elected AIF chairman. The communists responded by forming their own sporting organization, Rød Sport.

AIF sent 42 athletes to the 1931 Workers' Olympiad in Vienna, organized by the Socialist Workers' Sport International.

== Reunification ==
During the 1930s, there were several fruitless negotiations with Rød Sport (initiated on behalf of the communist side) regarding unity between the two organizations. In the end, the issue was settled after direct talks between AIF and the Soviet High Council of Physical Culture in Moscow in 1934. The reunification between AIF and Rød Sport was finalized at the 1935 AIF national conference. The reunification of the Norwegian workers' sport movement has been described as an early expression of the popular front line.

In 1935 the Norwegian government instituted a sports commission, trying to achieve unity between AIF and the bourgeois federation NLI. In 1936, the effort bore fruit and an agreement of cooperation between AIF and NLI came into force.

During the German occupation of Norway in 1940–1945, erstwhile rivals AIF and NLI joined forces in a sports boycott. The 'sportsfront', the opposition to the occupation from the sports movement, can be seen as an early expression of the Norwegian resistance.

NLI and AIF merged in 1946, forming the Norwegian Confederation of Sports (NIF).

== See also ==
- Østfold Workers' Sports Association
