= Ole Jacob Bangstad =

Norwegian military officer and sportsman

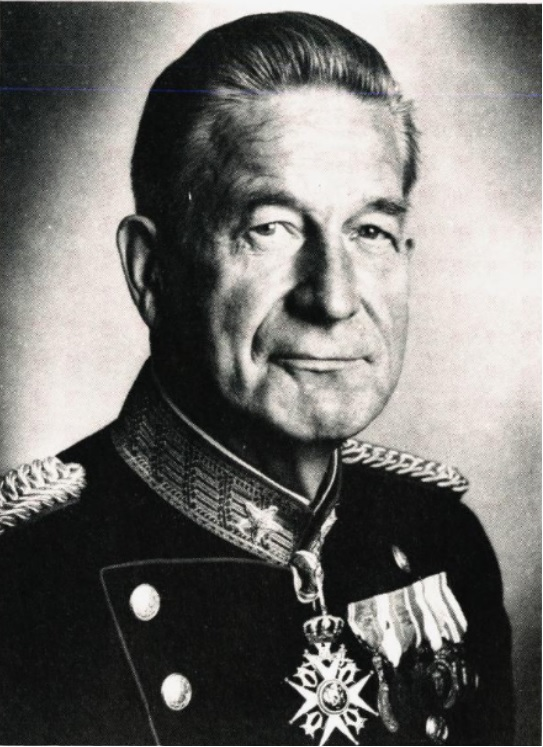
- Born: 9 April 1917; Harstad
- Died: 2 June 2010 (aged 93)
- Education: Norwegian Military Academy
- Occupations: Military officer and sports official
- Organization: President of the Norwegian Confederation of Sports from 1973 to 1984
- Awards: St. Olav's Medal with Oak Branch; King Haakon VII 1905–1955 Jubilee Medal; Order of St. Olav; Order of the Sword

Ole Jacob Bangstad (9 April 1917 – 2 June 2010) was a Norwegian military officer and sports official.

== Career ==
Bangstad was born at Harstad in Troms, Norway. He was the son of Alfred Bangstad (1874–1944) and Kristine Jacobsen (1883–1952). He attended the War College and became a lieutenant in the infantry during 1939. During World War II he participated in the Norwegian Campaign in Trøndelag and Northern Norway in 1940, was leader of the first Norwegian parachute company in Great Britain from 1943 to 1945, and leader of railway sabotage operations at the Nordland Line in 1945. He continued his military career after the war as a Major General from 1964 and appointed "generalinspektør for Hæren" from 1971 to 1979.

He was president of the Norwegian Confederation of Sports from 1973 to 1984. He also served as chairman of the Norwegian Committee for Skiing 1960–72 and vice president of the International Federation for Modern Pentathlon 1960–76.

== Awards ==
Bangstad's war decorations include the St. Olav's Medal with Oak Branch, as well as British medals. He received the King Haakon VII 1905–1955 Jubilee Medal, was decorated Commander of the Order of St. Olav in 1972, and was a Commander of the Order of the Sword.
