= Johan Sverre (actor) =

Norwegian actor

Johan Sverre (25 February 1923 – 27 November 1990) was a Norwegian actor.

He was born in Kristiania. He originally took an architect's education in Copenhagen, but made his stage debut as an actor in 1951. He worked at Nationaltheatret from 1951 to 1956, Riksteatret from 1956 to 1965, Trøndelag Teater from 1966 to 1969, and Den Nationale Scene from 1969.
