= Oscar Sigvald Julius Strugstad =

Norwegian general, politician and sports official (1851–1919)

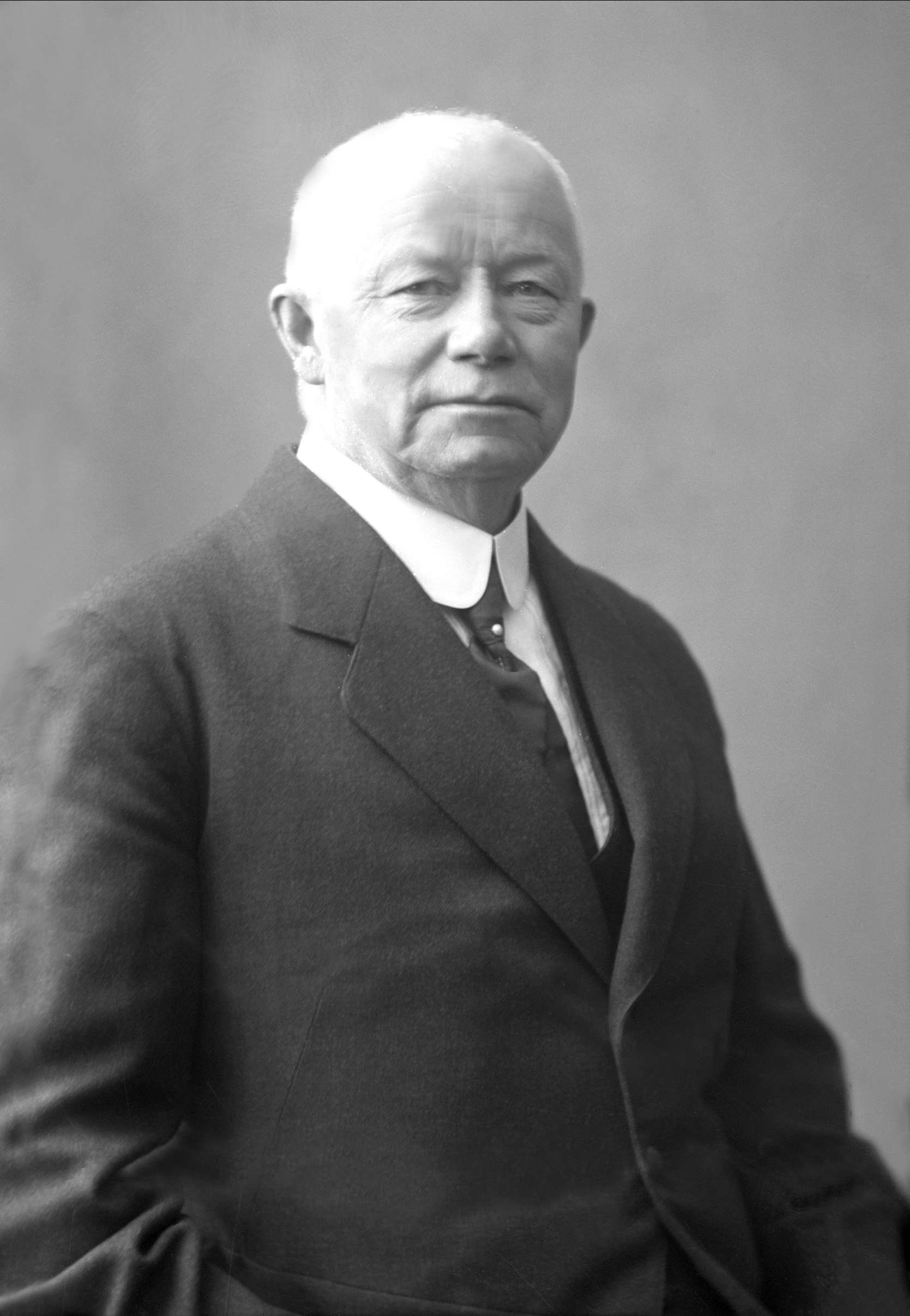
- Strugstad in 1918.

Minister of Defence
- In office 22 October 1903 – 11 March 1905
- Prime Minister: Francis Hagerup
- Preceded by: Thomas Heftye
- Succeeded by: Wilhelm Olssøn

Personal details
- Born: 6 July 1851 Trondheim, Sør-Trøndelag, Sweden-Norway
- Died: 12 August 1919 (aged 68) Vestre Aker, Norway
- Party: Coalition (from 1903); Liberal (until 1903)
- Spouse: Hilde Louise Anderssen (m. 1880)
- Children: Oscar Sigvald Strugstad

Oscar Sigvald Julius Strugstad (6 July 1851 – 12 August 1919) was a Norwegian military officer and politician. He served as Minister of Defence from 1903 to 1905.

He died in 1919 and was buried at Vestre gravlund. His son and grandson were both named Oscar Sigvald Strugstad.

Political offices
Preceded by Thomas Heftye	Norwegian Minister of Defence; 1903–1905	Succeeded by Wilhelm Olssøn
Sporting positions
Preceded by Frithjof Jacobsen	Chairman of Centralforeningen; 1906–1916	Succeeded by Hans Daae
