= Oscar Sigvald Strugstad =

Norwegian military officer (1887–1953)

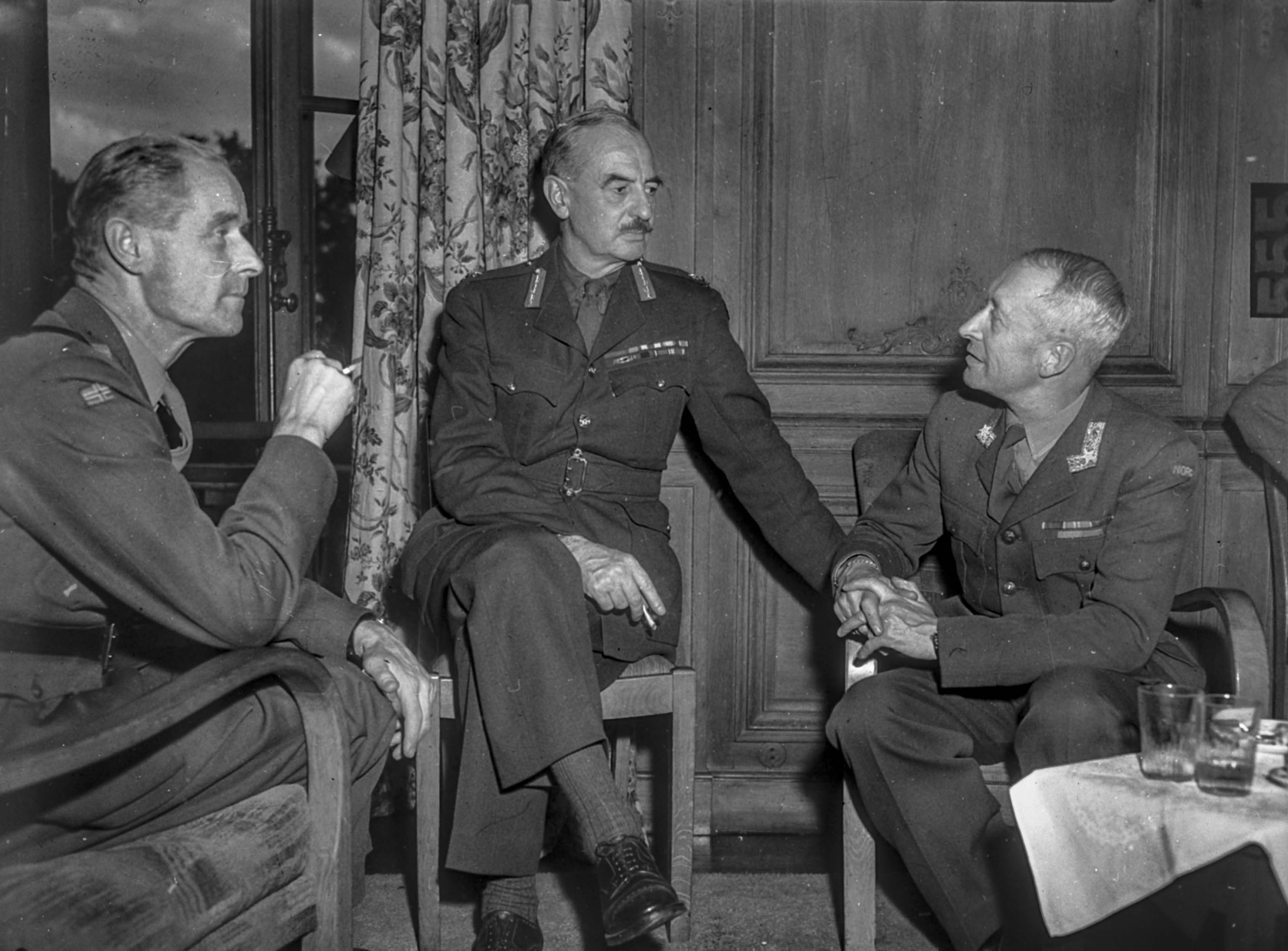
General Oscar Strugstad to the left together with Lt. Gen. A.E. Grassett, C.B. and D.S.O, General Johann Beichmann

Oscar Sigvald Strugstad (28 November 1887 – 15 March 1953) was a Norwegian military officer.

He was born in Kristiania as a son of Oscar Sigvald Julius Strugstad, who was Minister of Defence for a period. He became a Colonel in 1936, and Major General in 1942. In 1939, when Fredrik Monsen tried to name his successor as Minister of Defence, Strugstad was the strongest candidate along with Birger Ljungberg, who was ultimately chosen.

During the Second World War Strugstad was a military attaché in Stockholm from 1940 to 1941, leader of the Norwegian Brigade in Scotland from 1941 to 1942, and leader of the Norwegian military mission to the Allied command in London from 1943 to 1945. He was then stationed with the Allied commander in Norway after Germany's defeat, and led DK Trøndelag from 1945 to 1952.

He died in 1953 and was buried at Vestre gravlund. Strugstad's son, also named Oscar Sigvald Strugstad, was an executive in the food industry.
