= Norwegian Gymnastics Federation =

Norwegian national gymnastics association

- Founded: 25 May 1890
- Type: Gymnastics federation
- Location: Ullevaal Stadion, Oslo
- Region served: Norway
- Key people: Kristin Gilbert; Øistein Leren
- Website: www.gymogturn.no

The Norwegian Gymnastics Federation (Norwegian: Norges Gymnastikk- og Turnforbund, NGTF) is the national gymnastics association in Norway.

The Norwegian Gymnastics Federation was founded in 1890 as De Norske Turn- og Gymnastikkforeninger, and gymnastics was the first sport in Norway to be organized as a federation. The federation is a member of the Norwegian Confederation of Sports (NIF), the European Union of Gymnastics (UEG) and the International Federation of Gymnastics (FIG). Its headquarters are in Oslo.

As of 2016, its general secretary is Øistein Leren, and its president is Kristin Gilbert.
