= List of horse racing venues =

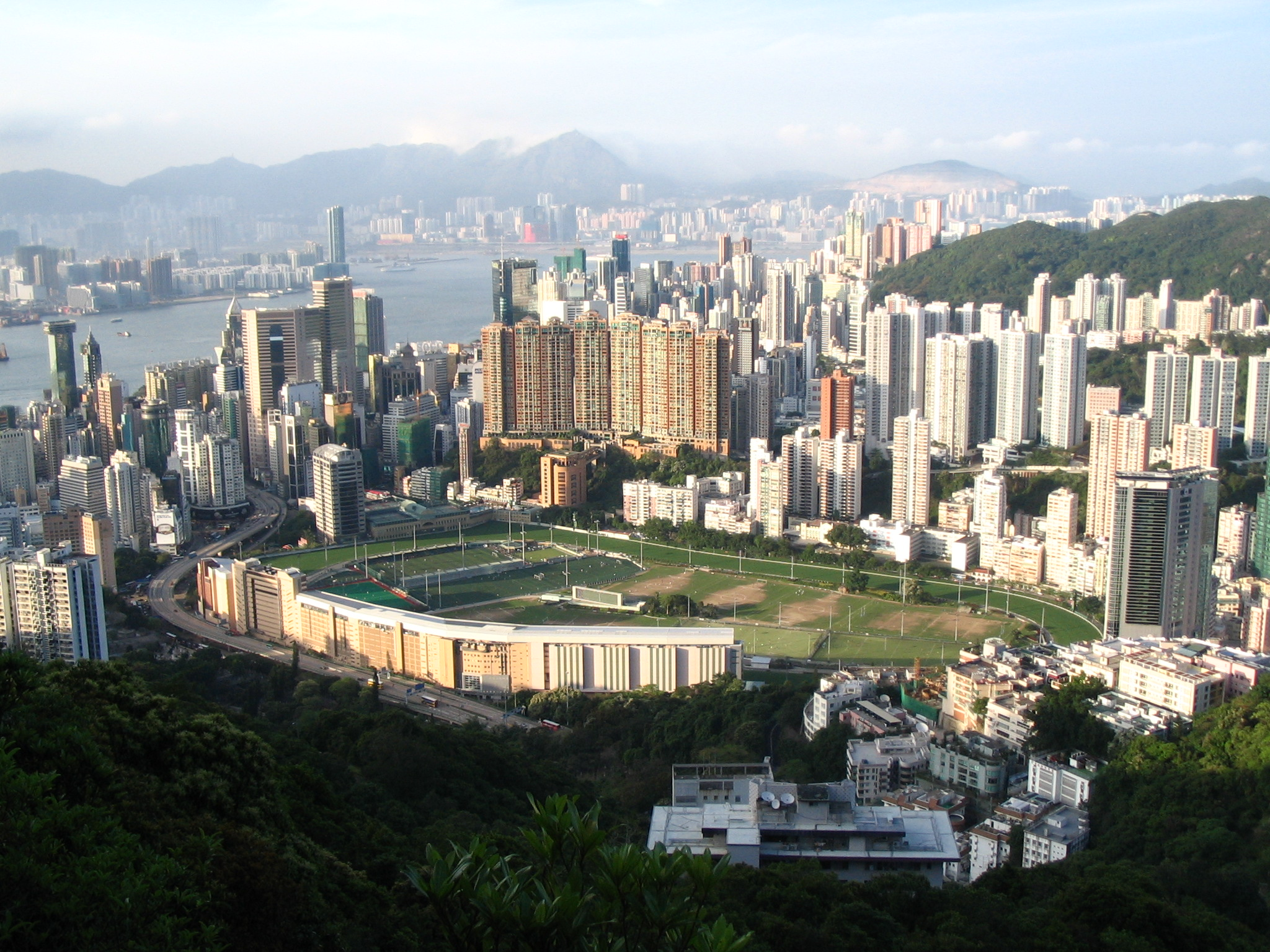
Happy Valley Racecourse, Hong Kong, 2008.

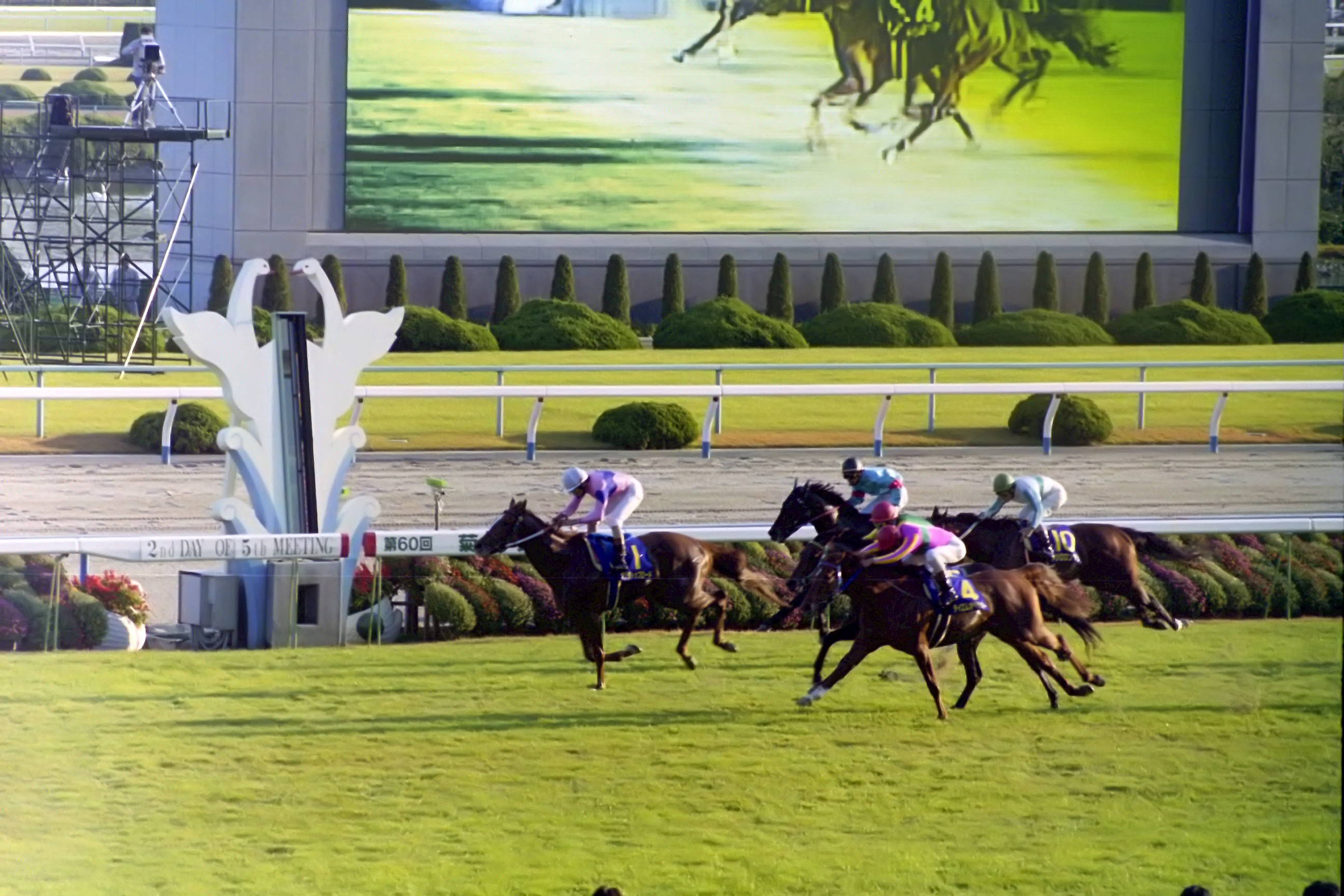
Kyoto Racecourse, Japan, 1999.

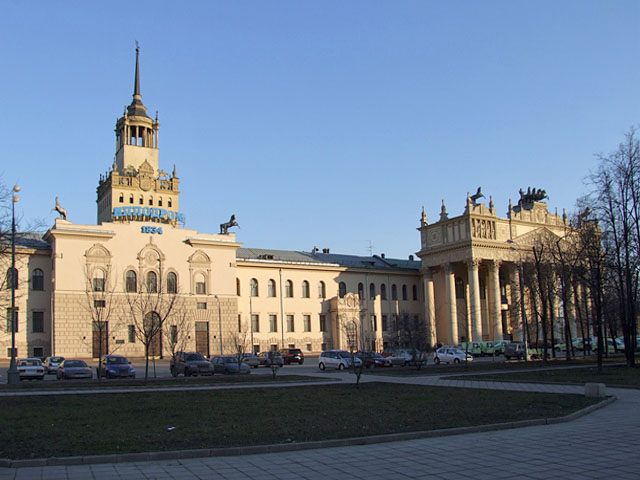
Central Moscow Hippodrome, 2007.

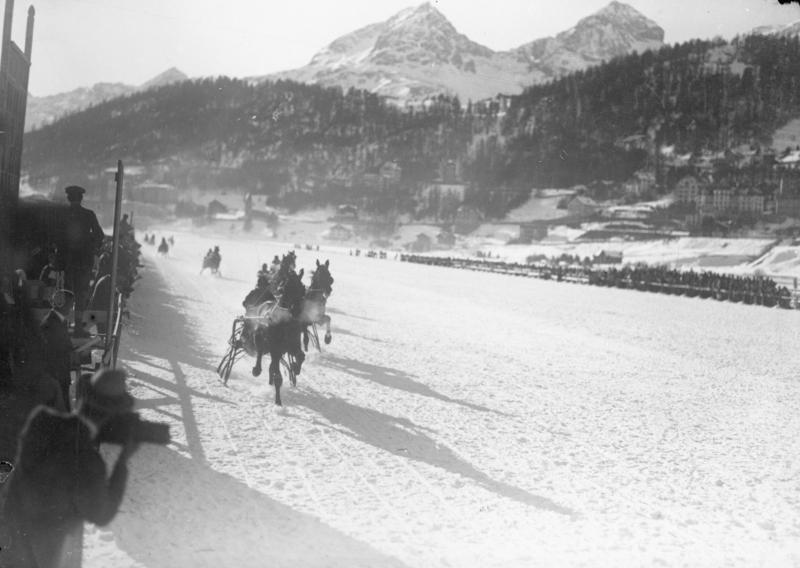
Winter-Rennbahn St. Moritz, 1931.

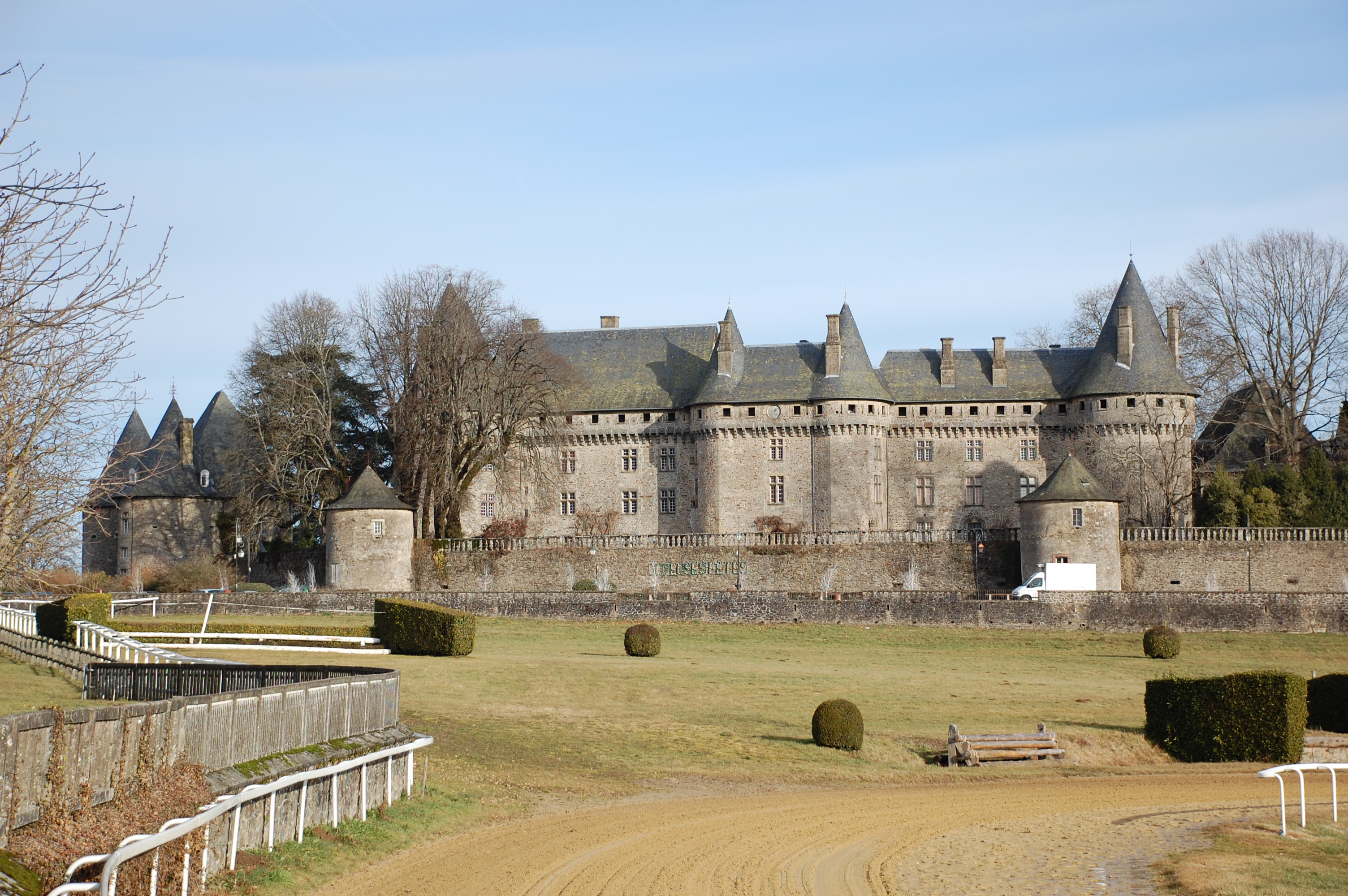
Hippodrome d'Arnac-Pompadour, France, 2008.

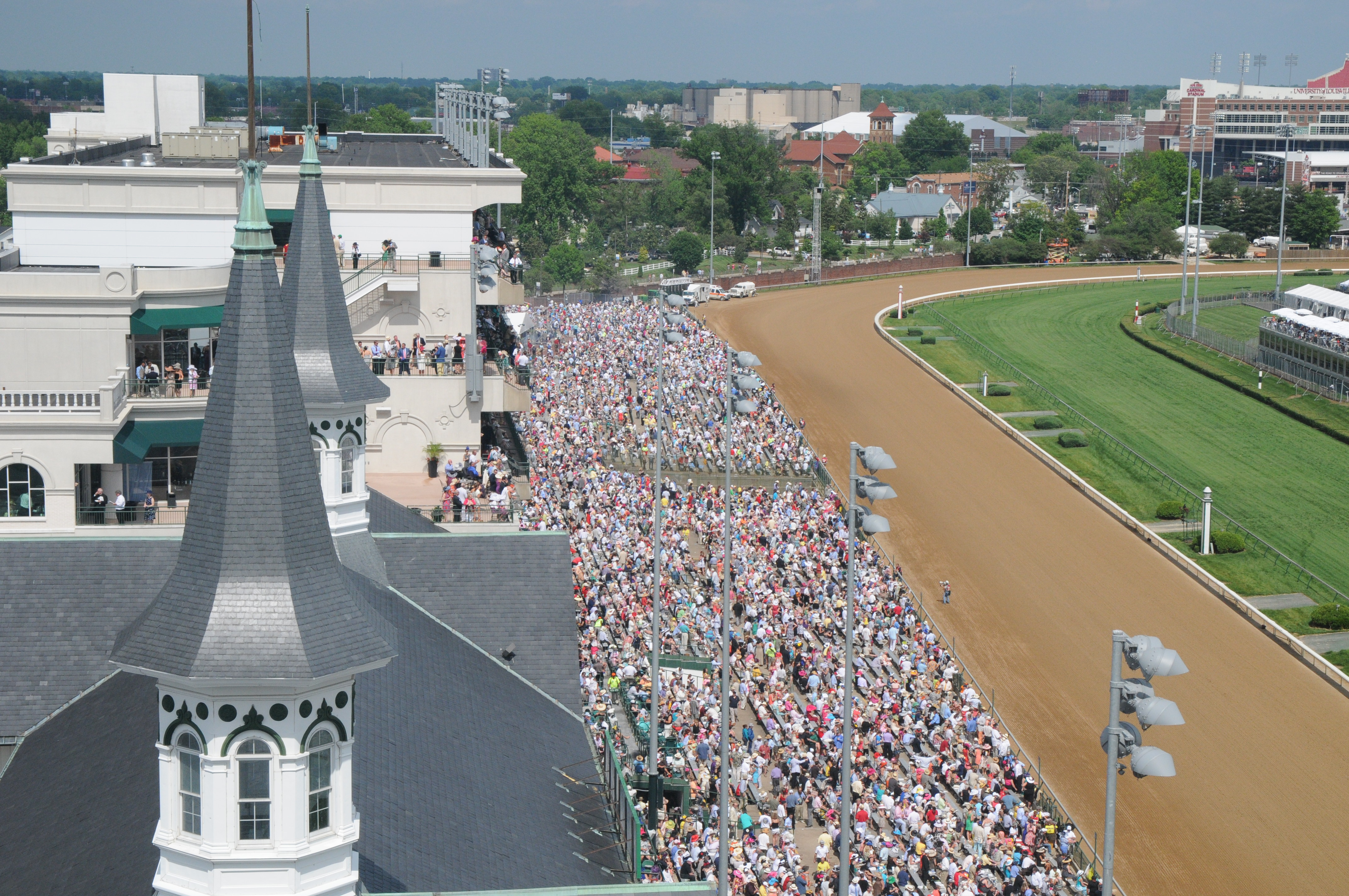
Churchill Downs, Kentucky, 2007.

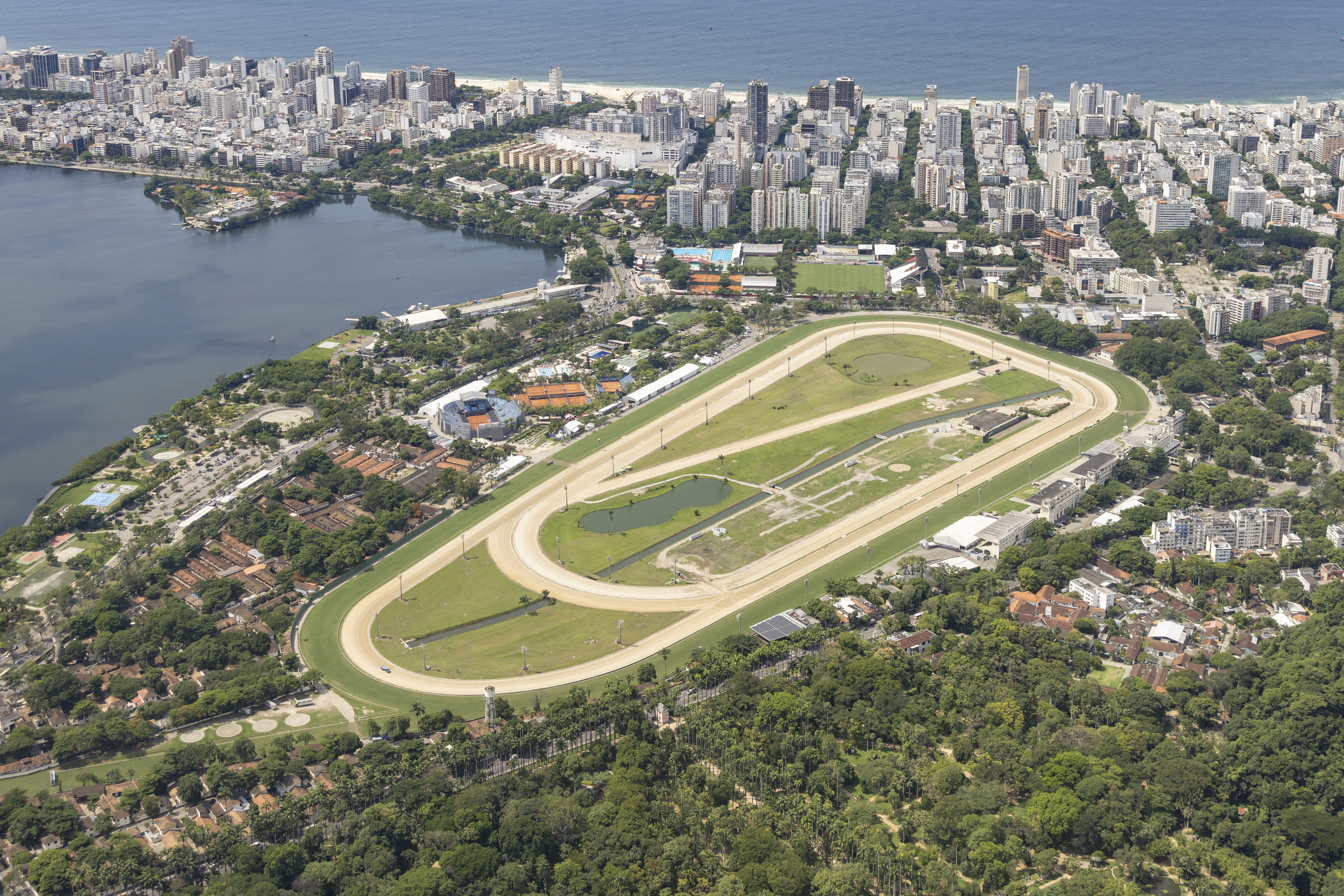
Jockey Club Brasileiro, Hipódromo da Gávea, Rio de Janeiro, 2010.

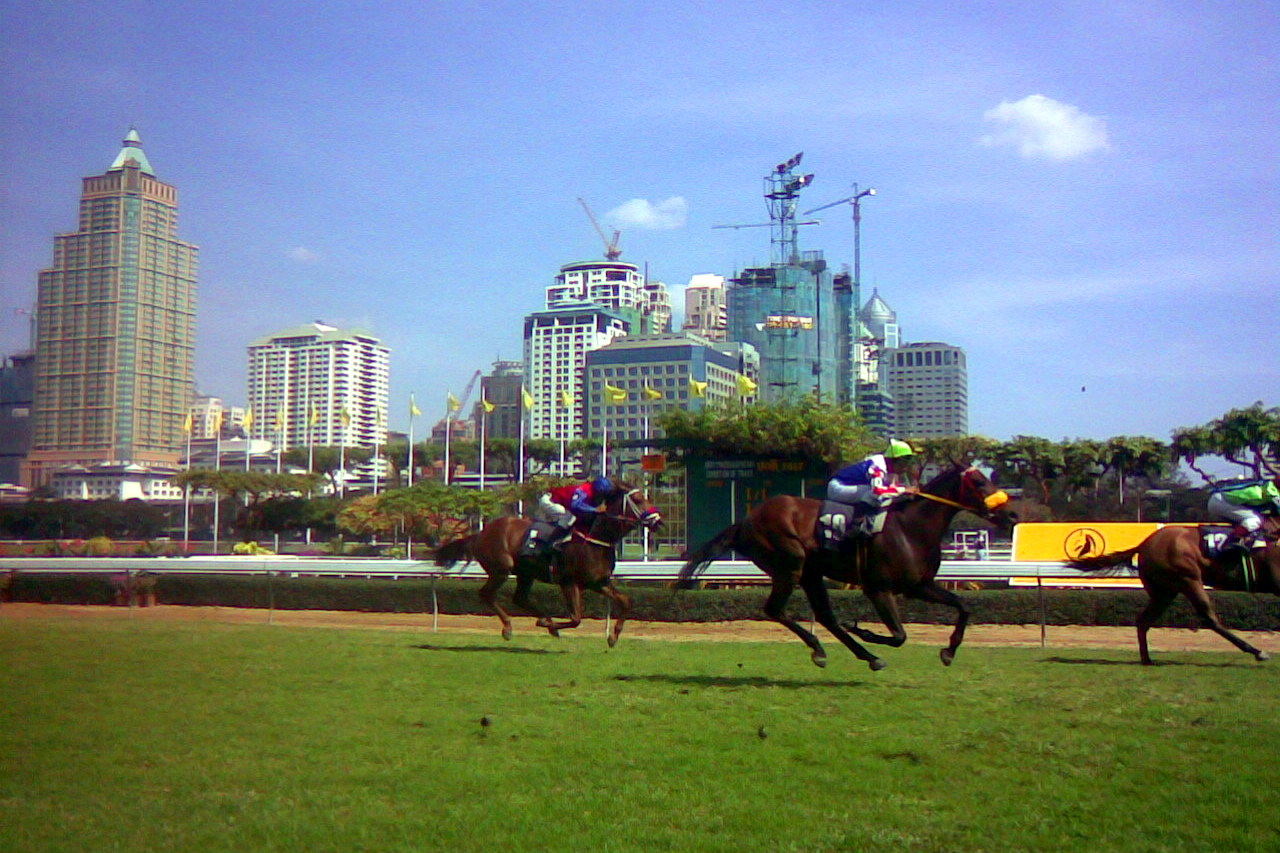
Royal Bangkok Sport Club, Thailand 2008.

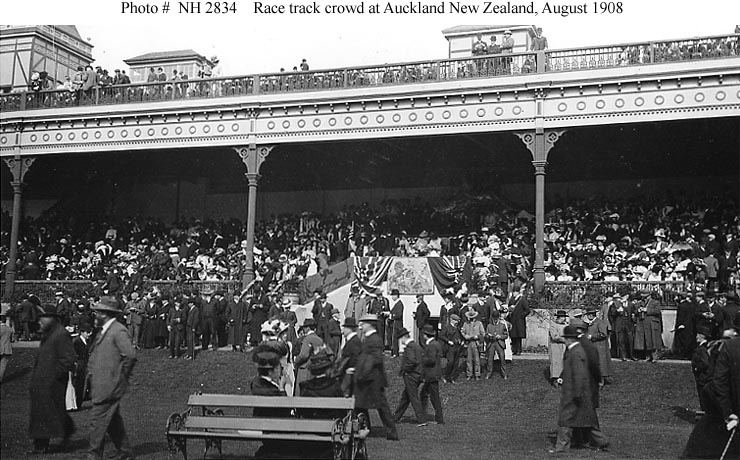
Ellerslie Racecourse, New Zealand, 1908.

This is a list of currently active horse racing venues, both Thoroughbred racing and harness racing, sorted by country. In most English-speaking countries they are called "racecourses". The United States and some parts of Canada use the term "racetracks" and some parts of Canada also use "raceway". In many non-English speaking countries a term cognate with hippodrome (e.g., Estonian: hipodroom, German: Hippodrom, Italian: ippodromo, etc.).

== Antigua ==
- Cassada Gardens Race Track, St Johns

== Argentina ==
- Hipódromo 27 de Abril, Santiago del Estero, Santiago del Estero Provience
- Hipódromo Argentino de Palermo, Buenos Aires
- Hipódromo Córdoba, Córdoba, Córdoba Province
- Hipódromo de La Plata, La Plata, Buenos Aires Province
- Hipódromo de Rosario, Rosario, Santa Fe Province
- Hipódromo de San Isidro, San Isidro, Buenos Aires Province
- Hipódromo de Tucumán, San Miguel de Tucaman, Tucaman Province

== Australia ==
There are over 360 registered racecourses in Australia where Thoroughbred racing takes place during about 3,050 race meetings. There are also a number of separate harness racing tracks.

=== Thoroughbred racing ===
- Albury Racing club, Albury, New South Wales
- Armidale Jockey Club, Armidale, New South Wales
- Ascot Racecourse, Perth, Western Australia
- Bairnsdale Racecourse, Bairnsdale, Victoria
- Ballarat Turf Club, Ballarat, Victoria
- Balnarring Racecourse, Balnarring, Victoria
- Belmont Park Racecourse, Perth, Western Australia
- Bendigo Racecourse, Bendigo, Victoria
- Birdsville Race Course, Birdsville, Queensland
- Broadmeadow Racecourse, Newcastle, New South Wales
- Callaghan Park, Rockhampton, Queensland
- Camperdown Racecourse, Camperdown, Victoria
- Canberra Racecourse, Canberra, Australian Capital Territory
- Canterbury Park Racecourse, Sydney, New South Wales
- Caulfield Racecourse, Melbourne, Victoria
- Clare Valley Racecourse, Clare, South Australia
- Clifford Park Racecourse, Toowoomba, Queensland
- Cluden Racecourse, Townsville, Queensland
- Cootamundra Racecourse, Cootamundra, New South Wales
- Cranbourne Racecourse, Cranbourne, Victoria
- Dingo Racecourse, Dingo, Queensland
- Doomben Racecourse, Brisbane, Queensland
- Eagle Farm Racecourse, Brisbane, Queensland
- The Entertainment Grounds, Gosford, New South Wales (formerly Gosford Race Club)
- Flemington Racecourse, Melbourne, Victoria
- Geelong Racecourse, Geelong, Victoria
- Hamilton Racecourse, Hamilton, Victoria
- Hawkesbury Race Club, Richmond, New South Wales
- Kalgoorlie-Boulder Racing Club, Kalgoorlie, Western Australia
- Kembla Grange Racecourse, Wollongong, New South Wales
- Lismore Turf Club, Lismore, New South Wales
- Moe Racecourse, Moe, Victoria
- Moonee Valley Racecourse, Melbourne, Victoria
- Mornington Racecourse, Mornington, Victoria
- Morphettville Racecourse, Adelaide, South Australia
- Randwick Racecourse, Sydney, New South Wales
- Rosehill Racecourse, Sydney, New South Wales
- Sale Racecourse, Sale, Victoria
- Sandown Racecourse, Melbourne, Victoria
- Seymour Racing Club, Seymour, Victoria
- Shoalhaven City Turf Club, Nowra, New South Wales
- Sunshine Coast Turf Club, Caloundra, Queensland
- Tamworth Jockey Club, Tamworth, New South Wales
- Terang Racecourse, Terang, Victoria
- Traralgon Racecourse, Traralgon, Victoria
- Wagga Racecourse, Wagga Wagga, New South Wales
- Walcha Jockey Club, Walcha, New South Wales
- Wangaratta Racecourse, Wangaratta, Victoria
- Warrnambool Racecourse, Warrnambool, Victoria
- Warwick Farm Racecourse, Sydney, New South Wales
- Wodonga Racecourse, Wodonga, Victoria
- Wyong Race Club, Wyong, New South Wales

=== Harness racing ===
- Albion Park Racecourse, Brisbane, Queensland
- Geelong Harness Racing Club, Geelong, Victoria
- Gloucester Park, Perth, Western Australia
- Menangle Park Paceway, Menangle Park, New South Wales
- Terang Harness Racing Club, Terang, Victoria

== Austria ==
- Magna Racino, Ebreichsdorf (near Vienna)
- Trabrennbahn Baden, Baden bei Wien (near Vienna)
- Trabrennbahn Krieau, Vienna
- Galopprennbahn Freudenau, Vienna (only one raceday per year always in September)
- Welser Trabrennbahn, Wels

== Bahrain ==
- Rashid Equestrian and Horseracing Club, Riffa

== Barbados ==
- Garrison Savannah Race Track, Bridgetown

== Belgium ==
- Hippodroom de Kuurne, Kuurne
- Hippodrome de Wallonie, Mons–Ghlin
- Hippodroom Tongeren, Tongeren
- Hippodroom Waregem, Waregem
- Hippodrome Wellington, Ostend

== Brazil ==
- Hipódromo da Gávea, Rio de Janeiro
- Hipodromo de Cidade Jardim, São Paulo
- Hipodromo do Cristal, Porto Alegre
- Hipodromo do Taruma, Curitiba

Other racetracks exist in Recife (PE), Pelotas (RS), Goiânia, (GO), Sao Vicente (SP), and Campos dos Goytacazes (RJ).

== Canada ==
=== Thoroughbred racing ===
==== Alberta ====
- Century Downs Racetrack and Casino, Calgary
- Evergreen Park, Grande Prairie
- Century Mile, Edmonton
- Rocky Mountain Turf Club, Lethbridge

==== British Columbia ====
- Hastings Racecourse, Vancouver

==== Manitoba ====
- Assiniboia Downs, Winnipeg

==== Ontario ====
- Ajax Downs, Ajax
- Fort Erie Race Track, Fort Erie
- Woodbine Racetrack, Toronto

=== Harness racing ===
Harness racing is sometimes conducted at short-term meets at various fairs and similar events. These venues include: Ayers Cliff Fair, Nouvelle Fair, Ormstown Fair, St Aime Des Lacs Fair, and St Joseph De Lepage Fair in Quebec; Miami Fair in Manitoba; and Woodstock Raceway-Connell Park in New Brunswick.

==== Alberta ====
- Century Downs Racetrack and Casino, Calgary
- Century Mile Racetrack and Casino, Edmonton
- The Track on 2, Lacombe

==== British Columbia ====
- Fraser Downs, Surrey (CLOSED - last harness race 5/2/2025)
- Desert Park, Osoyoos

==== Manitoba ====
- The Loop Exhibition Park, Winnipeg

==== Nova Scotia ====
- Inverness Raceway, Inverness
- Northside Downs, North Sydney
- Truro Raceway, Truro

==== Quebec ====
- Hippodrome 3R, Trois-Rivières

==== Ontario ====
- Clinton Raceway, Clinton
- Dresden Raceway, Dresden
- Flamboro Downs, Hamilton
- Georgian Downs, Innisfil
- Grand River Raceway, Elora
- Hanover Raceway, Hanover
- Hiawatha Horse Park, Sarnia
- Kawartha Downs, Fraserville
- Leamington Raceway, Leamington
- Rideau Carleton Raceway, Ottawa (CLOSED - last harness race 12/14/2025)
- The Raceway at Western Fair, London
- Woodbine Mohawk Park, Campbellville

==== Prince Edward Island ====
- Charlottetown Driving Park, Charlottetown
- Summerside Raceway, Summerside

== Channel Islands ==
- L'ancresse Racecourse, Guernsey, flat
- Les Landes Racecourse, Jersey, flat

== China ==
- Inner Mongolia Racecourse Hohhot
- Conghua Racecourse Guangzhou
- Ordos Yiqi Racecourse Ordos
- Orient Lucky City Racecourse Wuhan

== Chile ==
- Club Hípico de Concepción, Concepción, Bio-Bio Region
- Club Hípico de Santiago, Santiago
- Hipódromo Chile, Santiago
- Valparaiso Sporting Club, Viña del Mar, Valparaíso Region

== Colombia ==
- Hipodromo Villa de Leyva, Villa de Leyva

== Croatia ==
- Zagreb Hippodrome, Zagreb
- Sinj Hippodrome, Sinj

== Cyprus ==
- Nicosia Race Club, Nicosia

== Czech Republic ==
- Dostihové závodiště Benešov, Benešov
- Dostihové závodiště Brno, Brno
- Dostihové závodiště Karlovy Vary, Karlovy Vary
- Dostihové závodiště Kolesa, Kladruby nad Labem
- Dostihové závodiště Lysá nad Labem, Lysá nad Labem
- Dostihové závodiště Mimoň, Mimoň
- Dostihové závodiště Netolice, Netolice
- Dostihové závodiště Pardubice, Pardubice (site of the Velká pardubická)
- Dostihové závodiště Praha-Velká Chuchle, Prague
- Dostihové závodiště Slušovice, Slušovice
- Dostihové závodiště Světlá Hora, Světlá Hora
- Dostihové závodiště Tochovice, Tochovice
- Hipodrom Most, Most

== Denmark ==
- Nykøbing F. Travbane, Nykøbing F.
- Billund Trav, Billund
- Bornholms Brand Park, on The Island Bornholm in the Baltic sea. (Harness Racing) the smallest racetrack in the World.
- Charlottenlund Racetrack, Copenhagen (site of Copenhagen Cup)
- Fyens Væddeløbsbane, Odense
- Jydsk Væddeløbsbane, Aarhus
- Klampenborg Racecourse, Copenhagen
- NKI Racing Arena, Aalborg
- Skive Trav, Skive

== Dominican Republic ==
- Hipodromo V Centenario, Santo Domingo

== Estonia ==
- Tallinna Hipodroom, Tallinn (Closed 2022)

== Finland ==
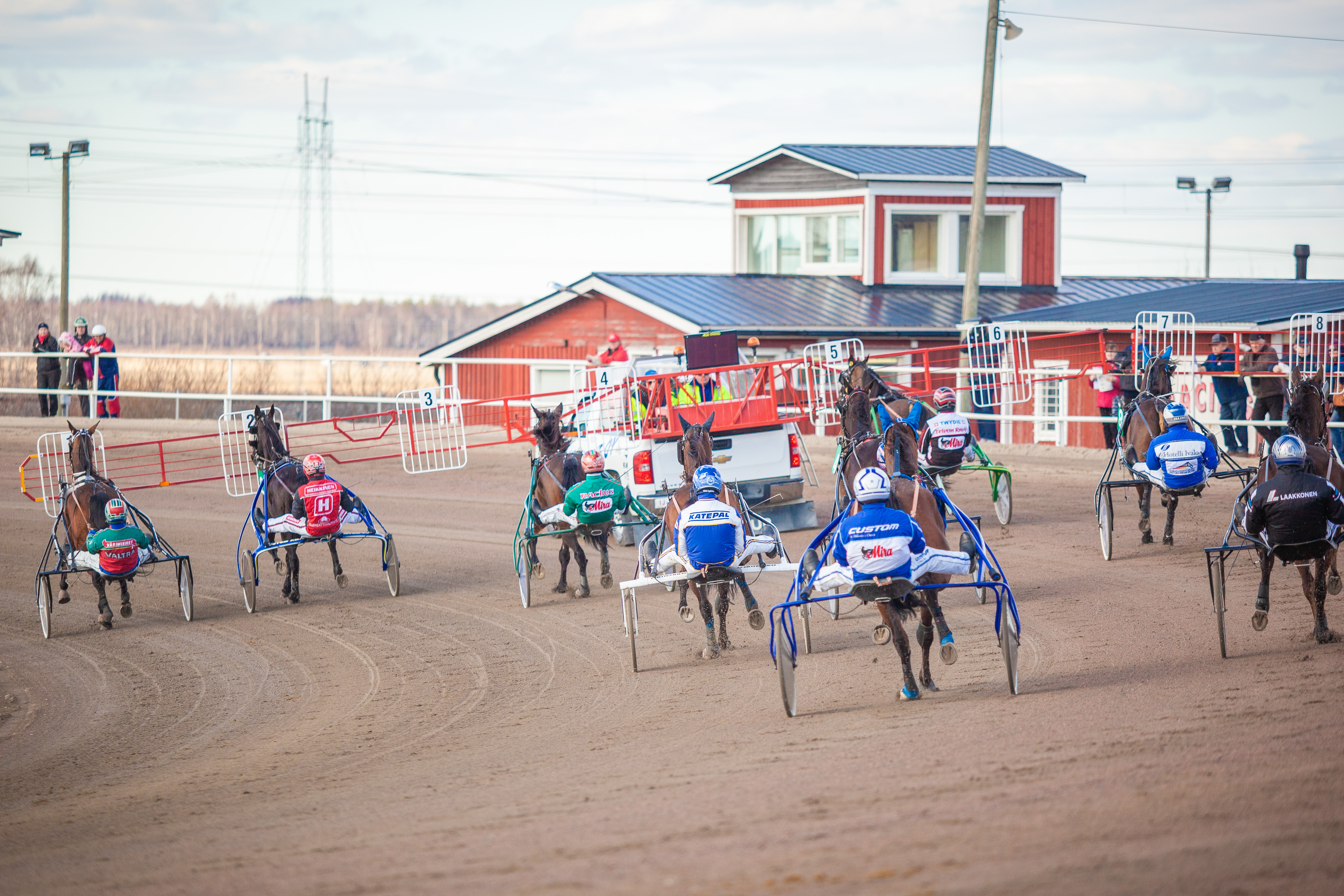
Harness racing on April 13, 2019, in Seinäjoki, Finland

- Äimärautio, Oulu
- Killeri, Jyväskylä
- Jokimaa, Lahti
- Kajaani Track, Kajaani
- Keskinen, Ylivieska
- Kouvola Track, Kouvola
- Laivakangas, Tornio
- Lappee, Lappeenranta
- Linnunlahti, Joensuu
- Mäntyvaara, Rovaniemi
- Metsämäki, Turku
- Mikkeli Track, Mikkeli
- Nikula, Kaustinen
- Pilvenmäki, Forssa
- Pori Track, Pori
- Seinäjoki Track, Seinäjoki
- Sorsasalo, Kuopio
- Teivo, Ylöjärvi (near Tampere)
- Tornio Track, Tornio
- Vaasa Track, Vaasa
- Vermo, Espoo (near Helsinki)

== France ==
The Fédération nationale des courses hippiques counted 231 racecourses in France in 2026.

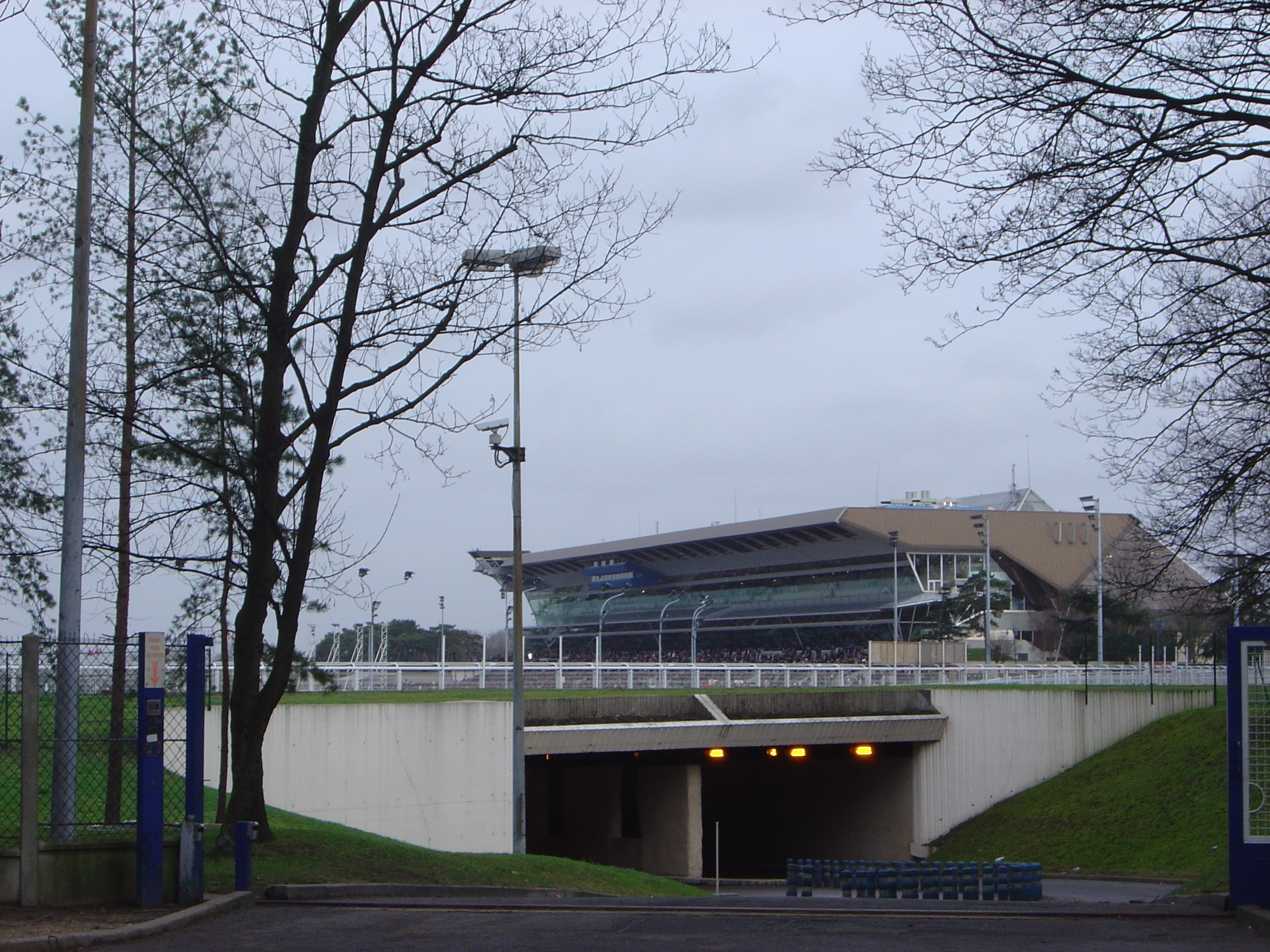
Racecourse at Vincennes

- Chantilly Racecourse, Chantilly
- Deauville-Clairefontaine Racecourse, Deauville
- Deauville-La Touques Racecourse, Deauville
- Hippodrome d'Auteuil, Auteuil, Paris
- Hippodrome de Bellerive, Vichy
- Hippodrome de Cabourg, Cabourg
- Hippodrome de la Côte d'Azur, Cagnes-sur-Mer
- Hippodrome de la Prairie, Caen
- Hippodrome de la Solle, Fontainebleau
- Hippodrome de Vincennes, Vincennes (vicinity of Paris)
- Hippodrome d'Enghien-Soisy, Enghien (vicinity of Paris)
- Hippodrome du putois, Compiègne
- Longchamp Racecourse, Paris (site of Prix de l'Arc de Triomphe)
- Maisons-Laffitte Racecourse, Maisons-Laffitte (vicinity of Paris)
- Marseille Borely Racecourse, Marseille
- Saint-Cloud Racecourse, Saint-Cloud (vicinity of Paris)

=== Alsace ===
- Hippodrome de la Hardt, Wissembourg
- Hippodrome de Strasbourg-Hoerdt, Hoerdt

=== Aquitaine ===
- Hippodrome de Cantereaux, Libourne
- Hippodrome de Castagnolles, Bazas
- Hippodrome de la Bidanne, Fargues
- Hippodrome de la Garenne, Agen
- Hippodrome de Laloubère, Tarbes
- Hippodrome de Pont-Long, Pau
- Hippodrome de Saint-Paul-les-Dax, Dax
- Hippodrome de Sarlande, Castillonnès
- Hippodrome des fleurs, Biarritz
- Hippodrome des Grands Pins, Mont-de-Marsan
- Hippodrome du Béquet, La Teste de Buch
- Hippodrome du Bouscat, Le Bouscat (banlieue de Bordeaux)
- Hippodrome de Pesquie-Bas, Villeréal
- Hippodrome de Sangruère, Villeneuve-sur-Lot

=== Auvergne ===
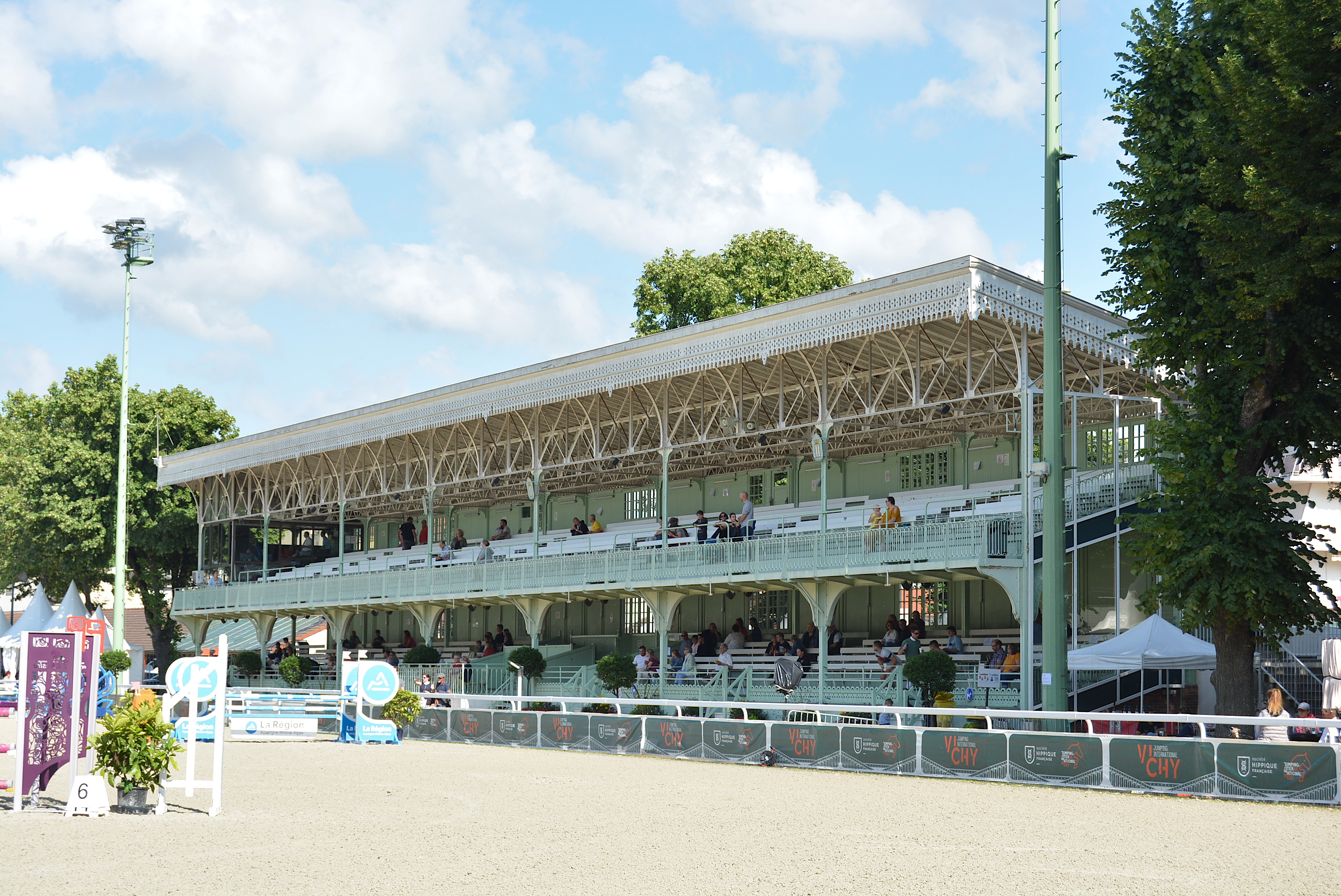
Grandstand in Vichy

- Hippodrome de Bellerive, Vichy
- Hippodrome des gateaux, Moulins
- Hippodrome Georges du Breil, Aurillac
- Hippodrome Saint-Jean, Montluçon

=== Brittany ===
- Hippodrome de Cano, Vannes
- Hippodrome de Croas-al-Leuriou, Landivisiau
- Hippodrome de Kerret, Guerlesquin
- Hippodrome de Kernivinen, Pontivy
- Hippodrome de la Baie, Saint-Brieuc
- Hippodrome de la Baie du Kernic, Plouescat
- Hippodrome de la grande marche, Fougères
- Hippodrome de la Plage Saint-Sieu, Lancieux
- Hippodrome de la Rive, Redon
- Hippodrome de Langolvas, Morlaix
- Hippodrome de Marville, Saint-Malo
- Hippodrome de Saint-Efflam, Plestin-les-Grèves
- Hippodrome des Bruyères, Maure-de-Bretagne
- Hippodrome du bel orme, Guingamp
- Hippodrome du Petit Paris, Corlay
- Hippodrome du Resto, Questembert

=== Burgundy ===
- Hippodrome de Cluny, Mâcon
- Hippodrome de la Varenne, Paray-le-Monial
- Hippodrome de Marcilly, Vitteaux

=== Centre ===
- Hippodrome de Chartres, Chartres
- Hippodrome de Dreux, Dreux
- Hippodrome de Grigny, Chinon
- Hippodrome de la Ferté Vidame
- Hippodrome de Lignières, Lignières
- Hippodrome de l'Île Arrault, Orléans
- Hippodrome de Tours-Chambray, Tours
- Hippodrome du Petit-Valençay, Châteauroux

=== Champagne-Ardenne ===
- Hippodrome de la Champagne, Reims
- Hippodrome de la Crouée, Montier-en-Der

=== Corsica ===
- Hippodrome de Calzarellu, Prunelli-di-Fiumorbo
- Hippodrome de Casatorra, Biguglia
- Hippodrome de Viseo, Zonza
- Hippodrome des Vignetta, Ajaccio

=== Franche-Comté ===
- Hippodrome de Comberjon, Vesoul

=== Île-de-France ===
- Hippodrome d'Auteuil, Paris
- Hippodrome de Fontainebleau, Fontainebleau
- Hippodrome de Grosbois, Boissy-Saint-Léger (banlieue of Paris), for the qualification of trotters in a training centre
- Hippodrome de Longchamp, Paris
- Hippodrome de Maisons-Laffitte, Maisons-Laffitte (banlieue of Paris)
- Hippodrome de Rambouillet, Rambouillet (banlieue of Paris)
- Hippodrome de Saint-Cloud, Saint-Cloud (banlieue of Paris)
- Hippodrome de Vincennes, Paris
- Hippodrome d'Enghien-Soisy, Enghien-les-Bains and Soisy-sous-Montmorency (banlieue of Paris)

=== Languedoc-Roussillon ===
- Hippodrome de la Fajeolle, Carcassonne
- Hippodrome des Courbiers, Nîmes

=== Limousin ===
- Hippodrome de La Sagne, Le Dorat
- Hippodrome de Pompadour, Arnac-Pompadour
- Hippodrome de Texonnieras, Limoges

=== Lorraine ===
- Hippodrome de Nancy-Brabois, Vandœuvre-lès-Nancy (banlieue of Nancy)
- Hippodrome de Vittel, Vittel

=== Lower Normandy ===
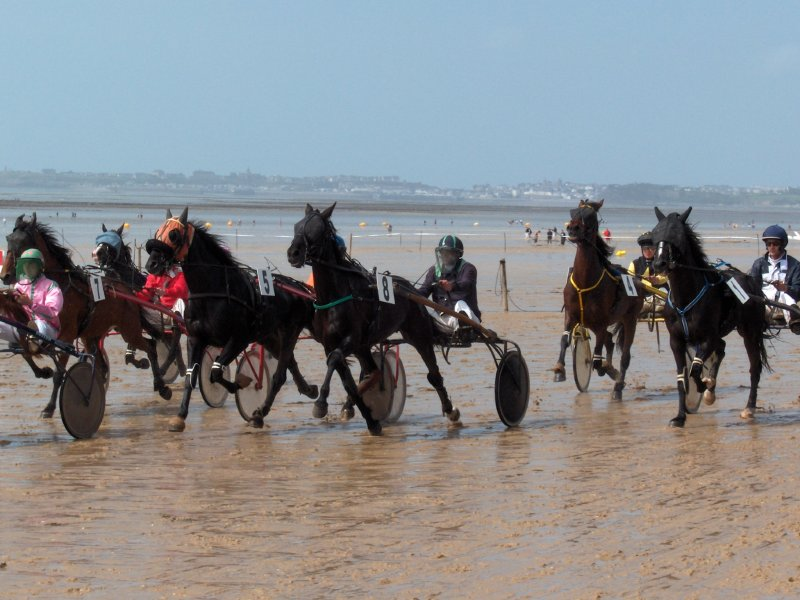
Racecourse at Jullouville.

- Trotting racetracks (ranked by Cheval Français)
  - National Centre:
    - Hippodrome de Cabourg, Cabourg
  - Regional Centres:
    - Hippodrome d'Argentan, Argentan
    - Hippodrome de la Prairie, Caen
    - Hippodrome du vieux Château, Graignes
  - Class 1:
    - Hippodrome de Deauville – Clairefontaine, Deauville
    - Hippodrome de la Glacerie, La Glacerie (banlieue de Cherbourg)
    - Hippodrome de la Trésorerie, Lisieux
    - Hippodrome Maurice-Jan, Moidrey (près du Mont Saint-Michel)
    - Hippodrome Robert Auvray, Vire
  - Class 2:
    - Hippodrome d'Alençon, Alençon
    - Hippodrome de Carentan la Russie, Carentan
    - Hippodrome de Sautchevreuil, Villedieu-les-Poêles
    - Hippodrome du Martinet, Agon-Coutainville
    - Hippodrome Gabriel Lefranc, Bréhal
  - Class 3:
    - Hippodrome d'Avranches, Avranches
    - Hippodrome de Bagnoles-de-l'Orne, Bagnoles-de-l'Orne
    - Hippodrome de Bourigny, La Chapelle-Cécelin
    - Hippodrome de la Cale, Jullouville
    - Hippodrome de la Croix des Landes, Domfront
    - Hippodrome de la Couperée, Dozulé
    - Hippodrome de la Dives, Saint-Pierre-sur-Dives
    - Hippodrome de La Fontaine, Le Sap
    - Hippodrome de la Madeleine, Hiesville (près de Sainte-Marie-du-Mont)
    - Hippodrome de Longueville-Bréville, Granville
    - Hippodrome de Rânes, Rânes
    - Hippodrome de Valognes, Valognes
    - Hippodrome des Grèves, Genêts
    - Hippodrome Jean-Gabin, Moulins-la-Marche
    - Hippodrome Les Pins, Portbail
- Unclassified and non-trotting racetracks:
  - Hippodrome de Deauville-La Touques, Deauville
  - Hippodrome de la Bergerie, Le Pin-au-Haras
  - Mortagne-au-Perche, Mortagne-au-Perche

=== Martinique ===
- Hippodrome de Carrère, Le Lamentin

=== Midi-Pyrénées ===
- Hippodrome de Borde-Vieille, Beaumont-de-Lomagne
- Hippodrome de la Cépière, Toulouse
- Hippodrome de la Ribère, Auch
- Hippodrome de Laloubère, Tarbes
- Hippodrome de Marches, Castelsarrasin
- Hippodrome de Marianne, Grenade
- Hippodrome des Allègres, Montauban
- Hippodrome du Baron, Castéra-Verduzan
- Hippodrome du Tumulus, Gramat

=== Nord-Pas-de-Calais ===
- Hippodrome de la Canche, Le Touquet
- Hippodrome de la Mollière, Beutin
- Hippodrome des Bruyères, Saint-Omer
- Hippodrome des Flandres (also known as Hippodrome du Croisé-Laroche), Marcq-en-Barœul (banlieue of Lille)
- Hippodrome des Hauts-Blancs-Monts, Arras

=== Pays de Loire ===
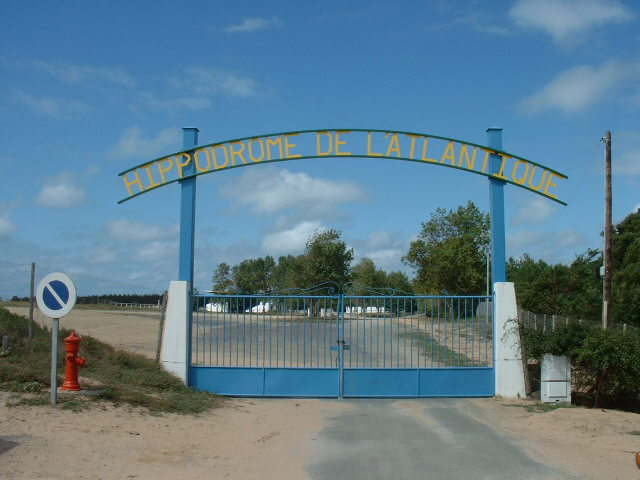
Racecourse of the Atlantic.

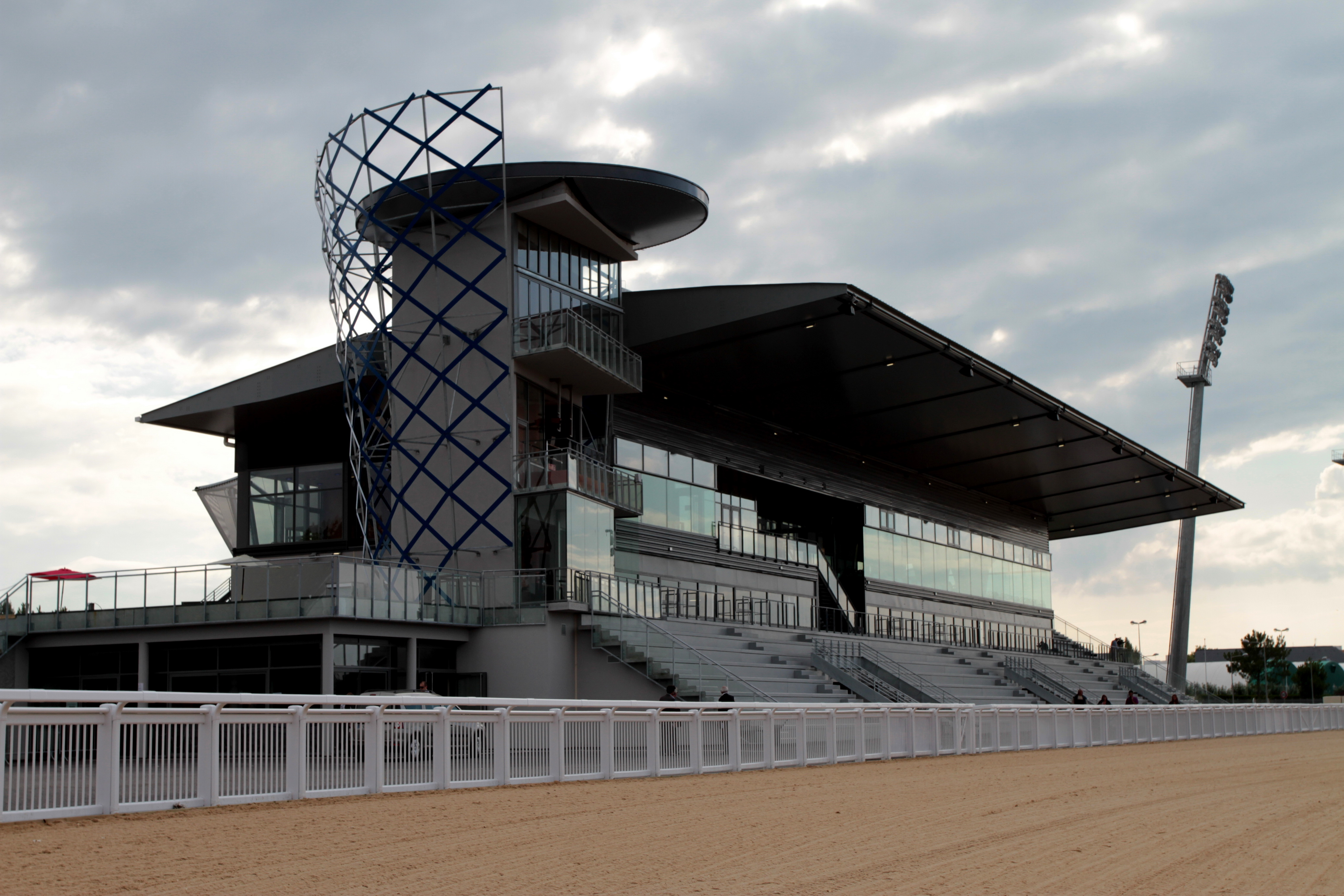
Racecourse of Pornichet.

- Hippodrome de Beaumont, Nort-sur-Erdre
- Hippodrome de Bellevue-la-Forêt, Laval
- Hippodrome de Clenet, Cholet
- Hippodrome de Fontenailles, Écommoy
- Hippodrome de la Bretonnière, Meslay-du-Maine
- Hippodrome de La Carrière, Durtal
- Hippodrome de l'Atlantique, Saint-Jean-de-Monts
- Hippodrome de la Loire, Cordemais
- Hippodrome de la Loire, Segré
- Hippodrome de la Malbrande, Les Sables-d'Olonne
- Hippodrome de la Métairie neuve, Châteaubriant
- Hippodrome de la prairie du château, Sablé-sur-Sarthe
- Hippodrome de La Touche, Craon
- Hippodrome de l'Isle-Briand, Le Lion-d'Angers
- Hippodrome de Pornichet, Pornichet
- Hippodrome de Portillon, Vertou
- Hippodrome de Verrie, Saumur
- Hippodrome des Chaumes, Machecoul
- Hippodrome des Hunaudières, Le Mans
- Hippodrome des Senonnettes, Senonnes–Pouancé
- Hippodrome d'Éventard, Angers
- Hippodrome du calvaire de la Magdeleine, Pontchâteau
- Hippodrome du Petit Port, Nantes
- Hippodrome les Noues, Challans

=== Picardy ===
- Hippodrome d'Ardon, Laon
- Hippodrome de Chantilly, Chantilly (banlieue of Paris)
- Hippodrome de la prairie Malicorne, Merlimont (Pas-de-Calais)
- Hippodrome de la Thiérache, La Capelle
- Hippodrome du petit Saint-Jean, Amiens
- Hippodrome du Putois, Compiègne

=== Poitou-Charentes ===
- Hippodrome de la Côte de Beauté, Royan
- Hippodrome de la Gatinière, La Roche-Posay
- Hippodrome de la Tourette, Angoulême
- Hippodrome de Mansle, Mansle
- Hippodrome de Romagne, Niort
- Hippodrome de Villeneuve, Thouars
- Hippodrome du Haut-Rillon, La Rochelle

=== Provence-Alpes-Côte d'Azur ===
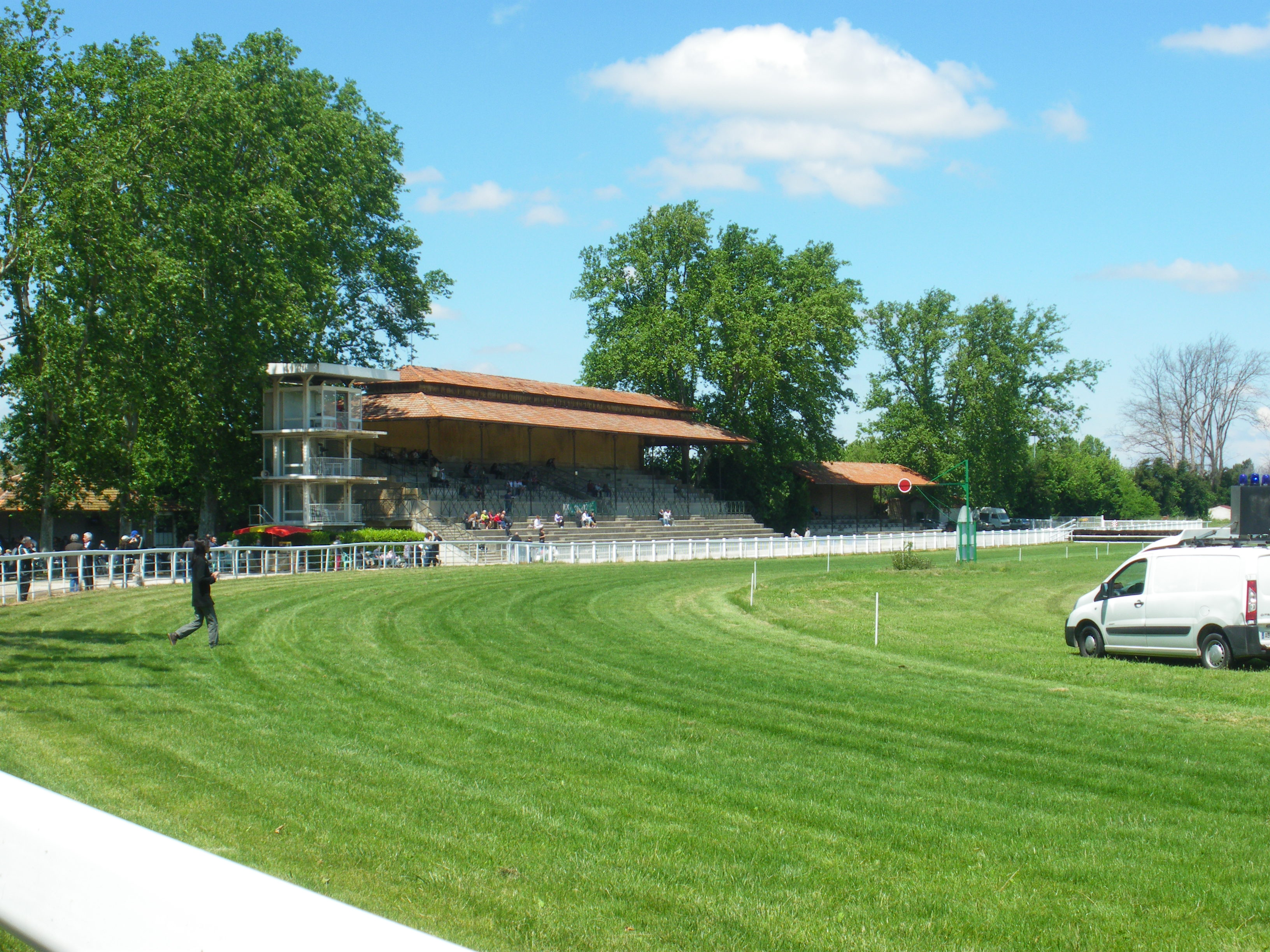
Racecourse of Roberty, Avignon

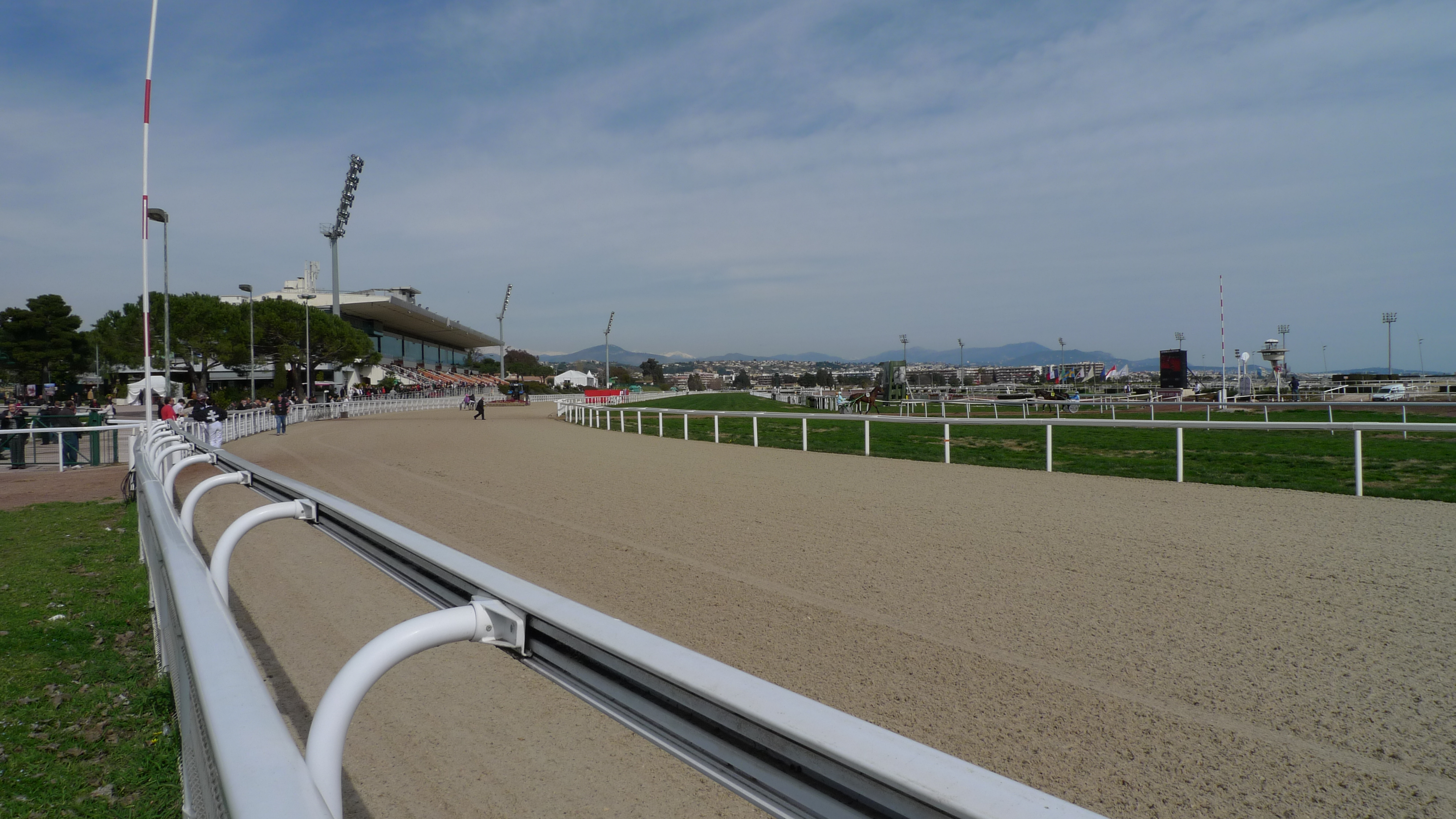
Racecourse of Cagnes-sur-Mer

- Hippodrome de Déffends, à Sault
- Hippodrome de la Côte d'Azur, Cagnes-sur-Mer
- Hippodrome de la Crau, Salon-de-Provence
- Hippodrome de la Durance, Cavaillon
- Hippodrome de la Levade, Bollène
- Hippodrome de Saint-Ponchon, Carpentras
- Hippodrome de la plage, Hyères
- Hippodrome Marseille Borély, Marseille
- Hippodrome Marseille Vivaux, Marseille
- Hippodrome Roberty, Avignon
- Hippodrome Saint-Gervais, L'Isle-sur-la-Sorgue

=== Rhône-Alpes ===
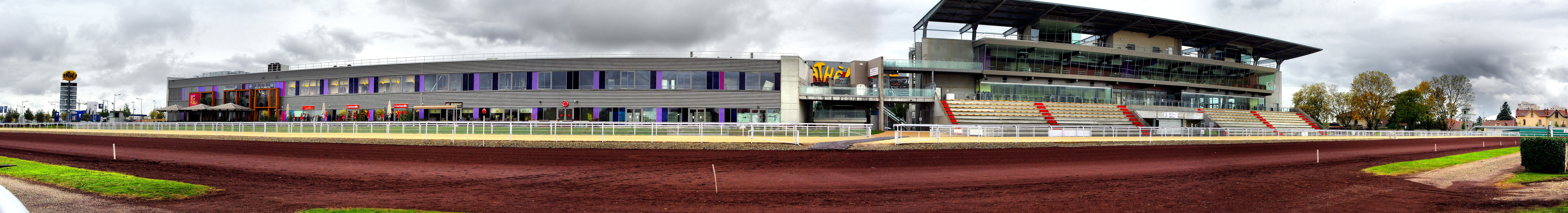
Racecourse of Villeurbanne

- Hippodrome André Longchamp, Divonne-les-Bains
- Hippodrome de Bel Air, Châtillon-sur-Chalaronne
- Hippodrome de Marlioz, Aix-les-Bains
- Hippodrome de Parilly, Bron (banlieue of Lyon)
- Hippodrome de Villeurbanne, Vaulx-en-Velin (banlieue of Lyon)
- Hippodrome du Parc, Feurs
- Hippodrome Joseph Desjoyaux, Saint-Galmier

=== Upper Normandy ===
- Hippodrome de Bacqueville-en-Caux, Bacqueville-en-Caux
- Hippodrome de Bernay, Bernay
- Hippodrome de Bihorel, Bihorel
- Hippodrome de Dieppe, Dieppe
- Hippodrome de Francheville, Francheville, Eure
- Hippodrome de Gournay en Bray, Gournay en Bray
- Hippodrome de Rouen-Mauquenchy, Mauquenchy
- Hippodrome de Saint-Aubin-lès-Elbeuf, Saint-Aubin-lès-Elbeuf
- Hippodrome des Andelys, Les Andelys
- Hippodrome des Bruyères, Rouen
- Hippodrome d'Évreux, Évreux
- Hippodrome du Neubourg, Le Neubourg

== Germany ==
- Galopprennbahn Bad Harzburg, Bad Harzburg, Lower Saxony
- Galopprennbahn Baden-Baden – Iffezheim, Baden-Baden, Baden-Württemberg
- Galopprennbahn Cologne-Weidenpesch, Cologne, North Rhine-Westphalia
- Galopprennbahn Dortmund-Wambel, Dortmund, North Rhine-Westphalia
- Galopprennbahn Dresden-Seidnitz, Dresden, Saxony
- Galopprennbahn Düsseldorf-Grafenberg, Düsseldorf, North Rhine-Westphalia
- Galopprennbahn Halle, Halle, Saxony-Anhalt
- Galopprennbahn Hamburg-Horn, Hamburg
- Galopprennbahn Hanover-Langenhagen, Hanover, Lower Saxony
- Galopprennbahn Haßloch, Haßloch, Rhineland-Palatinate
- Galopprennbahn Herxheim, Herxheim, Rhineland-Palatinate
- Galopprennbahn Hoppegarten, Hoppegarten, Brandenburg (near Berlin)
- Galopprennbahn Krefeld, Krefeld, North Rhine-Westphalia
- Racecourse Scheibenholz, Leipzig, Saxony
- Galopprennbahn Magdeburg-Herrenkrug, Magdeburg, Saxony-Anhalt
- Galopprennbahn Mannheim-Seckenheim, Mannheim, Baden-Württemberg
- Galopprennbahn Mülheim / Ruhr, Mülheim, North Rhine-Westphalia
- Galopprennbahn Munich-Riem, Munich, Bavaria
- Galopprennbahn Verden, Verden, Lower Saxony
- Pferdesportpark Karlshorst, Berlin
- Rennbahn Karlsruhe-Knielingen, Karlsruhe, Baden-Württemberg
- Rennbahn Saarbrücken-Güdingen, Saarbrücken, Saarland
- Trabrennbahn Bahrenfeld, Hamburg
- Trabrennbahn Daglfing, Munich, Bavaria
- Trabrennbahn Dinslaken, Dinslaken, North Rhine-Westphalia
- Trabrennbahn Gelsenkirchen (GelsenTrabPark), Gelsenkirchen, North Rhine-Westphalia
- Trabrennbahn Mariendorf, Berlin
- Trabrennbahn Mönchengladbach, Mönchengladbach, North Rhine-Westphalia
- Trabrennbahn Pfarrkirchen, Pfarrkirchen, Bavaria
- Trabrennbahn Straubing, Straubing, Bavaria

== Greece ==
- Markopoulo Racecourse, Markopoulo Mesogaias (near Athens)

== Guyana ==
- Alness Turf Club
- Anjoo Park
- Arima Park Turf Club
- Brighton Turf Club
- Bush Lot Sea View Park
- Kennard Memorial Turf Club
- Port Mourant Turf Club

== Hong Kong ==
- Happy Valley Racecourse
- Sha Tin Racecourse

== Hungary ==
- Kincsem Park, Budapest

== India ==
- Bangalore Turf Club, Bangalore
- Chennai Race Club, Chennai (previously known as Madras Race Club) at Guindy Race Course
- Delhi Race Club, Delhi
- Hyderabad Race Club, Hyderabad
- Mysore Race Club, Mysore
- Ooty Race Club, Udhagamandalam, is located amidst the mountains on very picturesque surrounds, and is used especially during the summer months when racing in the warmer regions may not be possible. It is a part of Madras Race Club.
- Royal Calcutta Turf Club, Calcutta
- Royal Western India Turf Club, Mumbai and Pune

== Indonesia ==
Most of the racecourse in Indonesia are dirt, except of Yosonegoro Racecourse.

- Balitka Racecourse, Manado
- Bukit Ambacang Racecourse, Bukittinggi
- HM Hasan Gayo Racecourse, Takengon
- Ki Ageng Astrojoyo Racecourse, Pasuruan
- Kubu Gadang Racecourse, Payakumbuh
- Legokjawa Racecourse, Pangandaran
- Maesa Tompaso Racecourse, Minahasa
- Pada Eweta Racecourse, Waikabubak
- Pulomas Racecourse, Jakarta, was a popular racecourse but it was long abandoned since 2014. However, there are plans that it will be revitalized by 2026 and will be integrated with Jakarta International Equestrian Park.
- Kandih Racecourse, Sawahlunto
- Sultan Agung Racecourse, Bantul
- Tegalwaton Racecourse, Semarang
- Yosonegoro Racecourse, Gorontalo

== Ireland ==
Horse racing in Ireland is organised on an All-Ireland basis by Horse Racing Ireland.

In the Republic of Ireland:

- Ballinrobe Racecourse (mixed)
- Bellewstown Racecourse (mixed)
- Clonmel races (mixed)
- Cork races (mixed)
- The Curragh races, County Kildare (site of Irish Derby) (flat)
- Dundalk races (all-weather) (flat)
- Fairyhouse races (mixed)
- Galway races (mixed)
- Gowran Park races (mixed)
- Kilbeggan races (jumps only)
- Killarney races (mixed)
- Laytown races (flat)
- Leopardstown races (mixed)
- Limerick races (mixed)
- Listowel races (mixed)
- Naas races (mixed)
- Navan races (mixed)
- Punchestown races (mixed)
- Roscommon races (mixed)
- Sligo races (mixed)
- Thurles races (mixed)
- Tipperary races (mixed)
- Tralee races (mixed)
- Tramore races (mixed)
- Wexford races (National Hunt only)

In Northern Ireland:

- Down Royal races (mixed)
- Downpatrick races (mixed)

== Italy ==
- Ippodromo Caprilli, Livorno
- Ippodromo Comunale, Ferrara
- Ippodromo Corrado Romanengo, Novi Ligure
- Ippodromo d'Abruzzo, S.Giovanni Teatino (near Chieti)
- Ippodromo dei Fiori, Albenga
- Ippodromo dei Marsi, Tagliacozzo
- Ippodromo dei Pini, Follonica
- Ippodromo dei Sauri, Castelluccio dei Sauri
- Ippodromo del Casalone, Grosseto
- Ippodromo del Garigliano, Santi Cosma e Damiano
- Ippodromo del Mediterraneo, Siracusa
- Ippodromo del Savio, Cesena
- Ippodromo del Visarno, Florence
- Ippodromo della Favorita, Palermo
- Ippodromo delle Capannelle, Rome (gallop and trot)
- Ippodromo delle Cascine, Florence
- Ippodromo di Agnano, Naples (site of Gran Premio Lotteria)
- Ippodromo di Arcoveggio, Bologna
- Ippodromo di Breda, Padua
- Ippodromo di Cirigliano, Aversa
- Ippodromo di Montebello, Trieste
- Ippodromo di San Marone, Civitanova Marche
- Ippodromo di San Rossore, Pisa
- Ippodromo di San Siro, Milan (site of Gran Premio di Milano)
- Ippodromo di Sant'Artemio, Treviso
- Ippodromo di Sesana, Montecatini Terme
- Ippodromo di Settimi, Anguillara Sabazia
- Ippodromo di Stupinigi, Vinovo (near Turin)
- Ippodromo di Valentinia, Pontecagnano
- Ippodromo Don Meloni, Ozieri
- Ippodromo Euritalia, Casarano (near Lecce)
- Ippodromo La Ghirlandina, Modena
- Ippodromo La Torricella, Capalbio (near Grosseto)
- Ippodromo Le Bettole, Varese
- Ippodromo Maia, Meran (site of Gran Premio Merano)
- Ippodromo Martini, Corridonia
- Ippodromo Paolo VI, Taranto
- Ippodromo Pian delle Fornaci, Siena
- Ippodromo Pinna, Sassari
- Ippodromo San Paolo, Montegiorgio
- Ippodromo Villa delle Rose, Lanciano
- Ippodromo Villacidro, Villacidro

== Jamaica ==
- Caymanas Park, Kingston

== Japan ==
=== Japan Racing Association ===
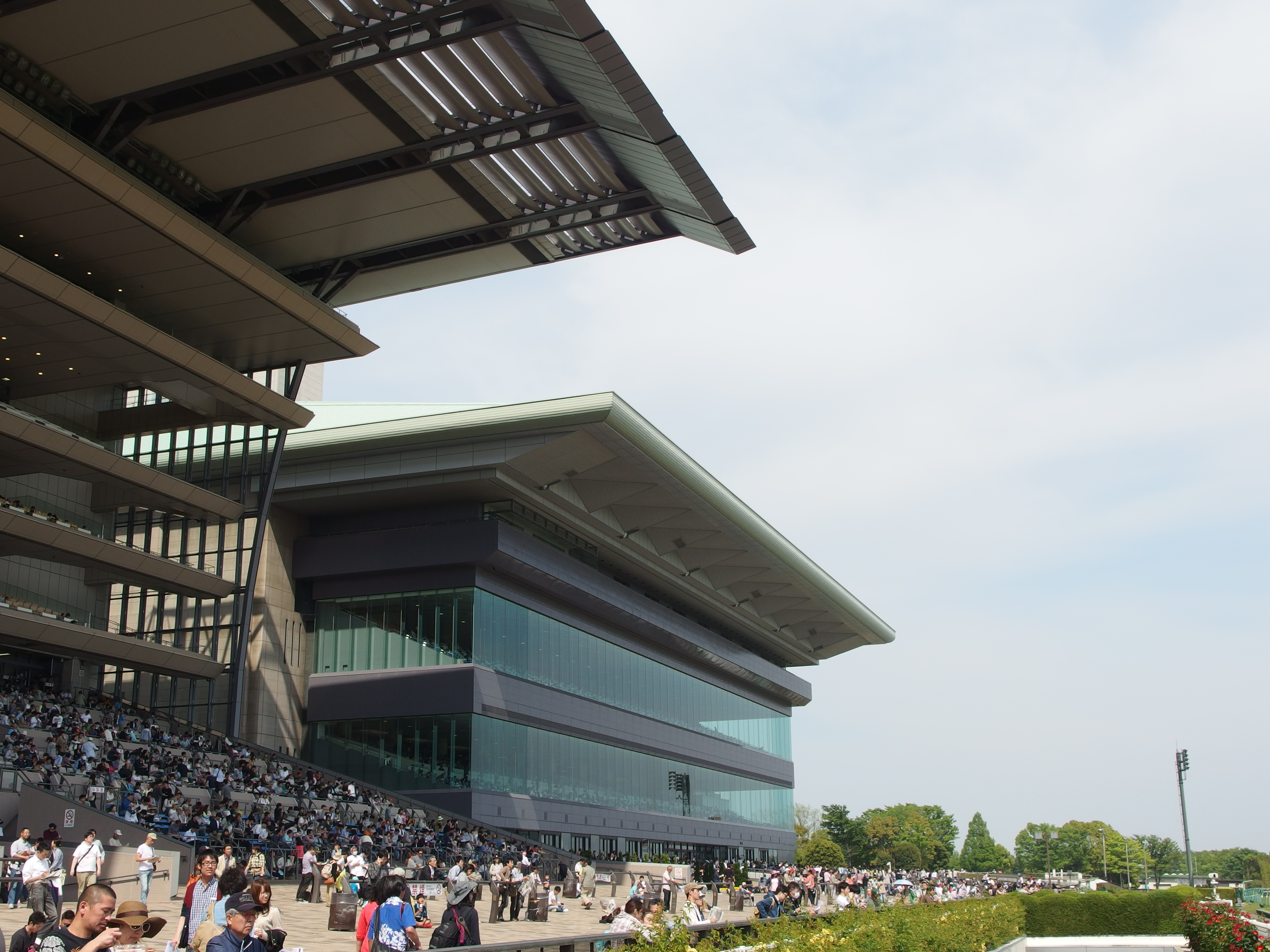
Tokyo Racecourse

- Chukyo Racecourse
- Fukushima Racecourse
- Hakodate Racecourse
- Hanshin Racecourse
- Kokura Racecourse
- Kyoto Racecourse
- Nakayama Racecourse
- Niigata Racecourse
- Sapporo Racecourse
- Tokyo Racecourse

=== The National Association of Racing ===
- Funabashi Racecourse
- Kanazawa Racecourse
- Kasamatsu Racecourse
- Kawasaki Racecourse
- Kochi Racecourse
- Mizusawa Racecourse
- Mombetsu Racecourse
- Morioka Racecourse
- Nagoya Racecourse
- Obihiro Racecourse (ban-ei racecourse)
- Oi Racecourse
- Saga Racecourse
- Sonoda Racecourse
- Urawa Racecourse

== Kazakhstan ==
- Almaty hippodrome, Almaty

== Kenya ==
- Ngong Racecourse, Nairobi

== Lebanon ==
- Beirut Hippodrome, Beirut

== Libya ==
- Abu Sitta Equestrian Club

== Macau ==
- Taipa Racecourse, Macau

== Malaysia ==
- Penang Turf Club, Penang
- Perak Turf Club, Ipoh
- Selangor Turf Club, Kuala Lumpur
- Royal Sabah Turf Club, Tuaran
- Sarawak Turf Club, Kuching

== Malta ==
- Gozo Race Track, Gozo
- Malta Racing Club, Marsa

== Mauritius ==
- Champ de Mars Racecourse, Port Louis

== Mexico ==
- The famous Agua Caliente Racetrack in Tijuana ceased operations as a horse / dog track
- Hipódromo de las Américas, Mexico City

== Morocco ==
- Hippodrome de Casa-Anfa, Casablanca
- Hippodrome de Settat, Settat
- Hippodrome Lalla Malika, El Jadida
- Hippodrome Rabat-Souissi, Rabat

== Netherlands ==
- Drafbaan Groningen, Groningen
- Drafcentrum Alkmaar, Alkmaar
- Renbaan Duindigt, Duindigt (near The Hague)
- Victoria Park, Wolvega, Wolvega (near Heerenveen)

== New Zealand ==
- Addington, Christchurch (harness racing and greyhounds)
- Alexandra Park, Auckland (harness racing)
- Ascot Park, Invercargill, Southland (gallops, harness racing and greyhounds)
- Ashburton, mid Canterbury
- Avondale, Auckland
- Awapuni, Palmerston North
- Cambridge Raceway, Cambridge (east of Hamilton) (harness racing and greyhounds)
- Cromwell, central Otago
- Dargaville, Northland
- Ellerslie Racecourse, Auckland
- Forbury Park, Dunedin (harness racing and greyhounds)
- Gisborne, Poverty Bay
- Gore, northern Southland
- Hastings, Hawkes Bay
- Hāwera, south Taranaki
- Hokitika, west coast of South Island
- Kaikōura, southern Marlborough (harness racing)
- Kumara, west coast of South Island
- Kurow, north Otago
- Manawatū Raceway, Palmerston North (harness racing and greyhounds)
- Matamata, eastern Waikato
- Methven, mid Canterbury (harness racing)
- Motukarara, Banks Peninsula
- New Plymouth, Taranaki
- Oamaru, north Otago
- Omakau, central Otago
- Omoto, Greymouth, west coast of South Island
- Orari, Geraldine, south Canterbury (harness racing)
- Ōtaki, Kāpiti Coast
- Paeroa, Hauraki Plains (now a training venue only)
- Patterson Park, Westport, Buller (harness racing)
- Phar Lap Raceway, Washdyke, Timaru, south Canterbury
- Pukekohe, Franklin district
- Rangiora, north of Christchurch
- Reefton, west coast of South Island
- Riccarton Park Racecourse, Christchurch
- Richmond, Nelson (harness racing)
- Riverton, west of Invercargill, Southland
- Rotorua, Bay of Plenty
- Roxburgh, central Otago (harness racing)
- Ruakākā, near Whangārei, Northland
- Tauherenikau, Wairarapa
- Taupō, central North Island
- Tauranga, Bay of Plenty
- Te Aroha, Thames Valley
- Te Awamutu, south of Hamilton
- Te Kapua Park, Stratford, Taranaki
- Te Rapa, Hamilton
- Te Teko, near Whakatāne, eastern Bay of Plenty
- Thames, Coromandel Peninsula
- Trentham Racecourse, Upper Hutt, near Wellington
- Waikouaiti, north of Dunedin
- Waimate, south Canterbury
- Waipukurau, southern Hawkes Bay
- Wairoa, northern Hawkes Bay
- Wanganui (Whanganui), north-west of Palmerston North
- Waterlea, Blenheim, Marlborough
- Waverley, north of Wanganui
- Wingatui, Dunedin
- Winton, central Southland
- Woodville, east of Palmerston North
- Wyndham, east of Invercargill, Southland

== Niger ==
- Hippodrome de Niamey, Niamey

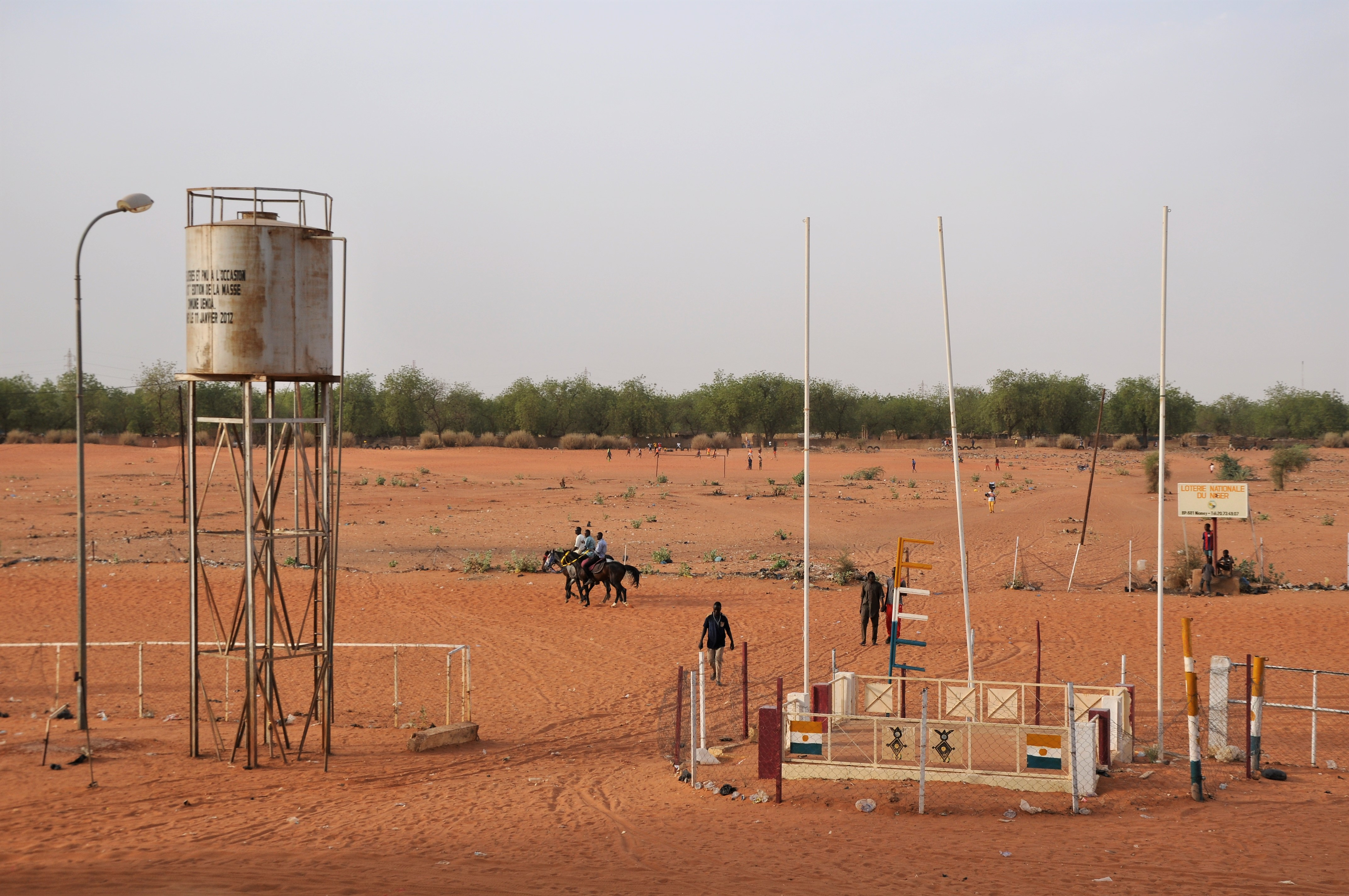
The hippodrome in Niamey, Niger.

== Norway ==
- Bergen Travpark, Bergen
- Biri Travbane, Gjøvik
- Bjerke Travbane, Oslo
- Drammen Travbane, Drammen
- Forus Travbane, Stavanger
- Harstad Travpark, Harstad
- Jarlsberg Travbane, Tønsberg
- Klosterskogen Travbane, Skien
- Leangen Travbane, Trondheim
- Momarken Travbane, Eidsberg
- Øvrevoll Galoppbane, Oslo
- Sørlandets Travpark, Kristiansand

== Pakistan ==
- Karachi Race Club, Karachi
- Lahore Race Club, Lahore

== Panama ==
- Hipódromo Presidente Remón, Panama City

== Paraguay ==
- Hipódromo de Asunción, Asunción

== Peru ==
- Hipódromo de Monterrico, Lima
- Hipódromo de Arequipa, Arequipa

== Philippines ==
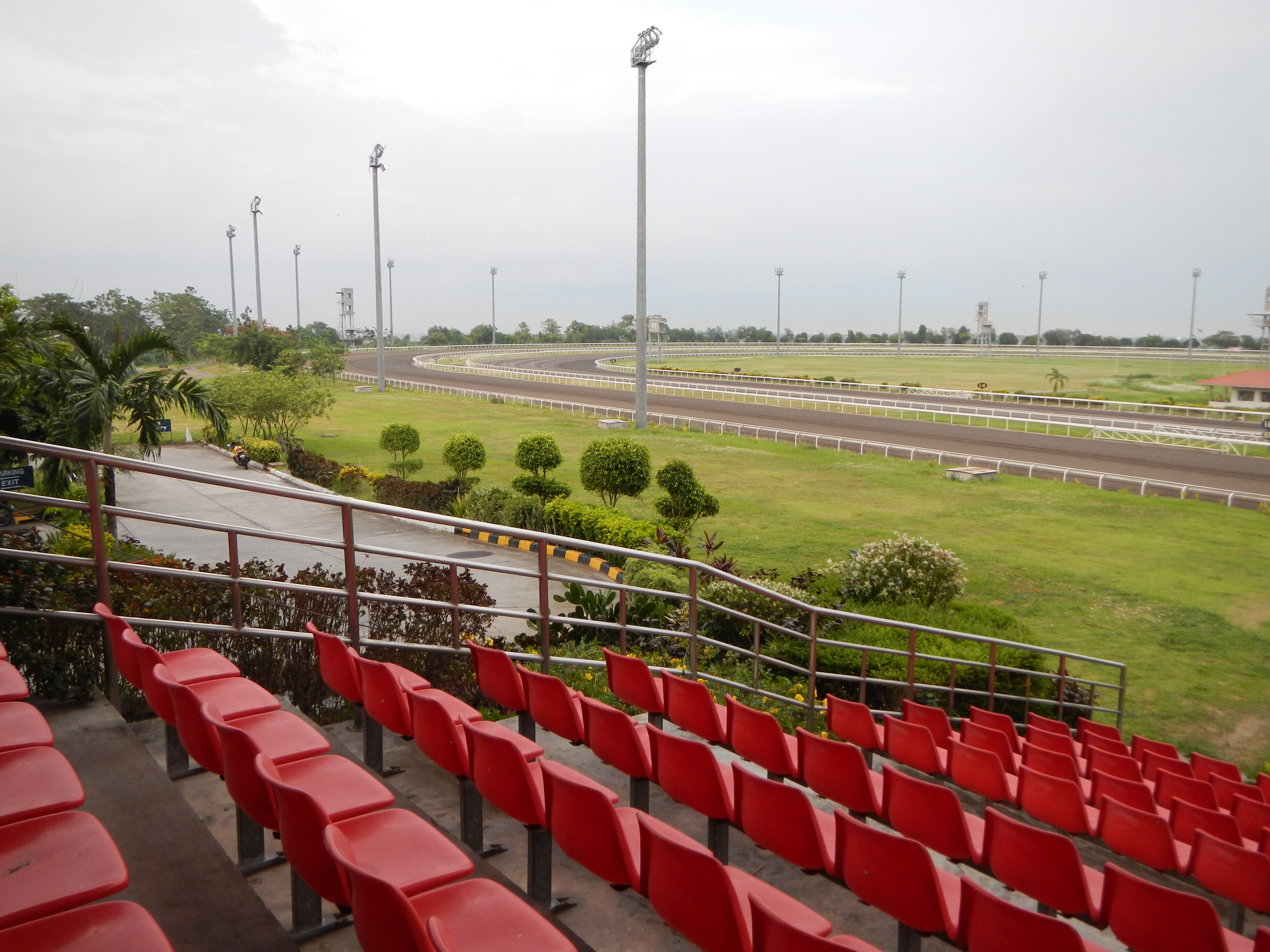
San Lazaro Leisure Park.

- The Horsemen's Track, Padre Garcia, Batangas (underconstruction)
- Metro Manila Turf Club (Metro Turf), Malvar and Tanauan, Batangas

== Poland ==
- Kraków Racecourse, Dąbrówka, Bochnia County
- Partynice Racecourse, Wrocław
- Służewiec Racecourse, Warsaw
- Sopot Hippodrome, Sopot

== Puerto Rico ==
- Hipódromo Camarero, San Juan

== Qatar ==
- Al Rayyan Race Course, Doha
- Al Uqda Racecourse, Al Khor

== Romania ==
- Hipodrom Ploiești, Ploiești

== Russia ==
- Central Moscow Hippodrome, Moscow
- Ramenskoye Ippodrom, Ramenskoye
- Kazan Ippodrom, Kazan, Tatarstan
- Naberezhnye Chelny Ippodrom, Naberezhnye Chelny, Tatarstan
- Rostov Ippodrom, Rostov-na-Donu
- Samara Ippodrom, Samara, Russia
- Akbuzat Race Track, Bashkortostan

== Saint Kitts and Nevis ==
- Indian Castle Race Track, Indian Castle, Nevis (only stages a handful of race days, almost entirely on public holidays)

== Saudi Arabia ==
- King Abdulaziz Racetrack, Riyadh
- King Khalid Race Track, Taif

== Serbia ==
- Hipodrom Beograd, Beograd
- Hipodrom Šabac, Šabac
- Požarevački hipodrom “Knez Mihailo”, Požarevac

== Slovakia ==
- Zavodisko, Bratislava

== South Africa ==
=== Gauteng ===
- Vaal Racecourse, Gauteng
- Turffontein Racecourse, Gauteng

=== Western Cape ===
- Durbanville Racecourse, Durbanville
- Kenilworth Racecourse, Cape Town
- Milnerton Racecourse, Milnerton

=== KwaZulu-Natal ===
- Scottsville Racecourse, Pietermaritzburg
- Clairwood Racecourse, Durban
- Greyville Racecourse, Durban

=== Eastern Cape ===
- Fairview Racecourse, Eastern Cape

=== Northern Cape ===
- Flamingo Park, Northern Cape

== South Korea ==
- Busan Gyeongnam Race Park, Busan
- Jeju Race Park, Jeju
- Seoul Race Park, Seoul

== Spain ==
- Gran Hipodromo de Andalucia – Dos Hermanas, Sevilla
- Hipodrom Municipal de Manacor, Manacor, Mallorca
- Hipodrom Municipal de Mao, Mahón, Menorca
- Hipodrom Sant Rafel, San Rafael, Ibiza
- Hipodrom Son Pardo, Palma de Mallorca, Mallorca
- Hipodrom Torre del Ram, Ciudadela de Menorca, Menorca
- Hipodromo de Antela, Ourense
- Hipodromo de Donostia, San Sebastián
- Hipódromo de la Zarzuela, Madrid
- Hipodromo de Pineda, Sevilla

== Sweden ==
- Åby Racetrack, Mölndal (near Gothenburg) (site of Olympiatravet)
- Arena Åmålstravet, Åmål
- Arena Dannero, Nyland, Sweden
- Axevalla Travbana, Axvall
- Bergsåker Travbana, Sundsvall
- Dala Travet, Rättvik
- Färjestad Travet, Karlstad
- Göteborg Galopp, Gothenburg
- Halmstad Travet, Halmstad
- Jägersro Galopp, Malmö
- Kalmar Travbana, Kalmar
- Mantorp Travet, Mantorp
- Möjligheternas Arena, Umeå
- Romme Travbana, Borlänge
- Solvalla, Stockholm
- Strömsholm Galopp, Strömsholm
- Sundbyholm Racing Track, Eskilstuna
- Bro Park Galopp, Önsta
- Tingsryd Racing Track, Tingsryd (1609 meters; the only one in Northern Europe)
- Trav Gävleborg, Gävle
- Umåker Travet, Umeå
- Visby Travbana, Visby
- Örebro Travet, Örebro
- Östersund Travbana, Östersund

== Switzerland ==
- Parkrennbahn Dielsdorf, Dielsdorf (near Zürich)
- Pferderennbahn Allmend, Frauenfeld
- Pferderennbahn IENA, Avenches
- Pferderennbahn Schachen, Aarau
- Winterrennbahn St. Moritz, the White Turf races were held in winter on the frozen St. Moritzersee

== Thailand ==
- Royal Bangkok Sports Club, Bangkok
- Chiang Mai Racecourse, Chiang Mai
- Khon Kaen Race Course, Khon Kaen
- Nakhon Ratchasima Race Course 2nd Infantry Division, Nakhon Ratchasima
- Udon Thani Race Course, Udon Thani

== Trinidad and Tobago ==
- Santa Rosa Park, Arima

== Turkey ==
- Ankara 75th Anniversary Race Course, Ankara
- Antayla Racecourse, Antalya
- Diyarbakır Race Course, Diyarbakır
- Elazığ Race Course, Elazığ
- Kocaeli Race Course, Kocaeli
- Osmangazi Race Course, Bursa
- Şanliurfa Race Course, Şanlıurfa
- Şirinyer Race Course, İzmir
- Veliefendi Race Course, Istanbul
- Yeşiloba Race Course, Adana

== Ukraine ==
- Kyiv Ippodrom, Kyiv

== United Arab Emirates ==
- Abu Dhabi Equestrian Club, Abu Dhabi
- Al Ain Racecourse, Al Ain,
- Jebel Ali Racecourse, Jebel Ali (near Dubai)
- Meydan Racecourse, Dubai
- Sharjah Racecourse, Sharjah, Dubai

== United Kingdom ==
The United Kingdom does not have a country-wide organising body for horseracing. The remit of the British Horseracing Authority does not extend to the island of Ireland; as a result, the two tracks in Northern Ireland are under the jurisdiction of Horse Racing Ireland.

=== England ===
Flat racing

- Bath Racecourse, Greater Bristol
- Beverley Racecourse, East Riding of Yorkshire
- Brighton Racecourse, East Sussex
- Chelmsford City Racecourse, Essex
- Chester Racecourse, Cheshire
- Epsom Downs Racecourse, Surrey
- Goodwood Racecourse, West Sussex
- Great Yarmouth Racecourse, Norfolk
- Newmarket Racecourses, Suffolk
- Nottingham Racecourse, Nottinghamshire
- Pontefract Racecourse, West Yorkshire
- Redcar Racecourse, North Yorkshire
- Ripon Racecourse, North Yorkshire
- Salisbury Racecourse, Wiltshire
- Thirsk Racecourse, North Yorkshire
- Wolverhampton Racecourse, West Midlands
- York Racecourse, Yorkshire

National hunt

- Aintree Racecourse, Merseyside
- Cartmel Racecourse, Cumbria
- Cheltenham Racecourse, Gloucestershire
- Exeter Racecourse, Devon
- Fakenham Racecourse, Norfolk
- Fontwell Park Racecourse, West Sussex
- Hereford Racecourse, Herefordshire
- Hexham Racecourse, Northumberland
- Huntingdon Racecourse, Cambridgeshire
- Ludlow Racecourse, Shropshire
- Market Rasen Racecourse, Lincolnshire
- Newton Abbot Racecourse, Devon
- Plumpton Racecourse, East Sussex
- Sedgefield Racecourse, County Durham
- Stratford-on-Avon Racecourse, Warwickshire
- Taunton Racecourse, Somerset
- Uttoxeter Racecourse, Staffordshire
- Warwick Racecourse, Warwickshire
- Wincanton Racecourse, Somerset
- Worcester Racecourse, Worcestershire

Mixed

- Ascot Racecourse, Berkshire
- Carlisle Racecourse, Cumbria
- Catterick Bridge Racecourse, North Yorkshire
- Doncaster Racecourse, South Yorkshire
- Haydock Park Racecourse, Merseyside
- Kempton Park Racecourse, Surrey
- Leicester Racecourse, Leicestershire
- Lingfield Park Racecourse, Surrey
- Newbury Racecourse, Berkshire
- Newcastle Racecourse, Tyne and Wear
- Sandown Park Racecourse, Surrey
- Southwell Racecourse, Nottinghamshire
- Wetherby Racecourse, West Yorkshire
- Windsor Racecourse, Berkshire

=== Scotland ===
- Ayr Racecourse, Ayrshire (mixed)
- Hamilton Park Racecourse, South Lanarkshire (flat)
- Kelso Racecourse, the Scottish Borders (national hunt)
- Musselburgh Racecourse, East Lothian (mixed)
- Perth Racecourse, Perth and Kinross (national hunt)

=== Wales ===
- Bangor on Dee Racecourse, Wrexham (national hunt)
- Chepstow Racecourse, Monmouthshire (mixed)
- Ffos Las Racecourse, Carmarthenshire (mixed)

== United States ==
=== Thoroughbred racing ===
==== Arizona ====
- Turf Paradise, Phoenix

==== Arkansas ====
- Oaklawn Park, Hot Springs

==== California ====
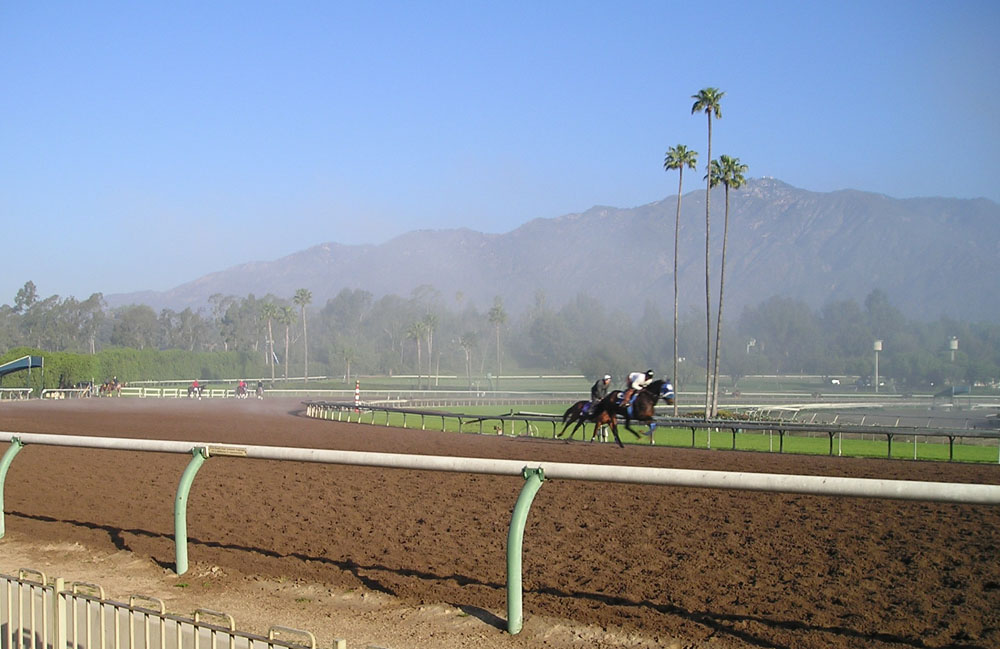
Santa Anita Park racecourse

- Del Mar Racetrack, Del Mar
- Los Alamitos, Los Alamitos
- Santa Anita Park, Arcadia

==== Colorado ====
- Arapahoe Park, Aurora

==== Delaware ====
- Delaware Park, Wilmington

==== Florida ====
- Gulfstream Park, Hallandale Beach
- Tampa Bay Downs, Tampa

Idaho

- Pocatello Downs, Bannock County
- Jerome Fair, Jerome
- Cassia County Fair, Burley
- Eastern Idaho State Fair, Blackfoot
- Oneida County Fair, Malad

==== Illinois ====
- Fairmount Park Racetrack, Collinsville
- Hawthorne Race Course, Cicero

==== Indiana ====
- Horseshoe Indianapolis, Shelbyville

==== Iowa ====
- Prairie Meadows, Altoona

==== Kentucky ====
- Churchill Downs, Louisville (site of the Kentucky Derby, the first 'jewel' in the "Triple Crown" of thoroughbred horse racing)
- Ellis Park Race Course, Henderson
- Keeneland Race Course, Lexington
- Kentucky Downs, Franklin
- Turfway Park, Florence

==== Louisiana ====
- Delta Downs, Vinton
- Evangeline Downs, Opelousas
- Fair Grounds, New Orleans
- Louisiana Downs, Bossier City

==== Maryland ====
- Laurel Park (race course), Laurel
- Maryland State Fairgrounds, Timonium (only held during state fair, late August-early September)
- Pimlico Race Course, Baltimore (site of the Preakness Stakes, second jewel in the "Triple Crown" of thoroughbred horse racing)

==== Minnesota ====
- Canterbury Park, Shakopee

==== Nebraska ====
- Columbus Races, Columbus
- Fonner Park, Grand Island
- Horsemen's Park, Omaha
- Legacy Downs, Lincoln
- Lake Mac Casino Resort & Racetrack, Ogallala
- Atokad Downs, South Sioux City

==== New Jersey ====
- Meadowlands Racetrack, East Rutherford
- Monmouth Park Racetrack, Oceanport

==== New Mexico ====
- Albuquerque Downs, Albuquerque
- Ruidoso Downs, Ruidoso Downs (permanently closed due to floods)
- Sunland Park, Sunland Park
- SunRay Park, Farmington
- Zia Park, Hobbs

==== New York ====
- Aqueduct Racetrack, Jamaica, Queens, New York City [last live racing on 6/28/2026]
- Belmont Park, Elmont (site of Belmont Stakes, third jewel in the "Triple Crown" of thoroughbred horse racing)
- Finger Lakes Gaming and Race Track, Canandaigua
- Saratoga Race Course, Saratoga Springs

==== North Dakota ====
- North Dakota Horse Park, Fargo
- Chippewa Downs, Belcourt

==== Ohio ====
- Belterra Park, Cincinnati
- Hollywood Gaming at Mahoning Valley Race Course, Youngstown
- Thistledown Racino, North Randall

==== Oklahoma ====
- Fair Meadows Race Track, Tulsa
- Remington Park, Oklahoma City
- Will Rogers Downs, Claremore

==== Oregon ====
- Grants Pass Downs, Grants Pass
- Eastern Oregon Livestock Show, Union
- Crooked River Roundup, Prineville
- Tillamook County Fair, Tillamook

==== Pennsylvania ====
- Parx Casino and Racing, Bensalem Township
- Hollywood Casino at Penn National Race Course, Grantville
- Presque Isle Downs, Erie

==== Texas ====
- Lone Star Park, Grand Prairie
- Retama Park, Selma
- Sam Houston Race Park, Houston
- Gillespie County Fairgrounds, Fredericksburg

==== Virginia ====
- Colonial Downs, New Kent County

==== Washington ====
- Emerald Downs, Auburn

==== West Virginia ====
- Hollywood Casino at Charles Town Races, Charles Town
- Mountaineer Casino, Racetrack and Resort, Chester

==== Wyoming ====
- Wyoming Downs, Evanston
- Sweetwater Downs, Rock Springs
- Energy Downs, Gillette

=== Harness racing ===
Note: Harness racing is sometimes conducted at short-term meets at various fairs and similar events. Many notable harness races are held at such venues, such as the Fox Stake at the Indiana State Fair and the Little Brown Jug at the Delaware County Fairgrounds in Delaware, Ohio.

==== Delaware ====
- Dover Downs, Dover
- Harrington Raceway & Casino, Harrington

==== Illinois ====
- Hawthorne Race Course, Stickney/Cicero (also conducts thoroughbred racing)

==== Indiana ====
- Hoosier Park, Anderson

==== Kentucky ====
- The Red Mile, Lexington
- Oak Grove (racecourse), Oak Grove
- Cumberland Run, Corbin

==== Maine ====
- Bangor Raceway, Bangor
- First Tracks Cumberland, Cumberland

==== Maryland ====
- Ocean Downs, Berlin
- Rosecroft Raceway, Oxon Hill

==== Massachusetts ====
- Plainridge Racecourse, Plainville

==== Minnesota ====
- Running Aces Harness Park, Columbus

==== New Jersey ====
- Meadowlands Racetrack, East Rutherford (also conducts thoroughbred racing)

==== New York ====
- Batavia Downs, Batavia
- Buffalo Raceway, Hamburg
- Historic Track, Goshen
- Monticello Raceway, Sullivan County
- Saratoga Raceway, Saratoga Springs
- Tioga Downs, Nichols
- Vernon Downs, Vernon
- Yonkers Raceway, Yonkers

==== Ohio ====
- MGM Northfield Park, Northfield
- Hollywood Gaming at Dayton Raceway, Dayton
- Miami Valley Gaming, Lebanon
- Scioto Downs Racino, Columbus
- Delaware County Fairgrounds, Delaware

==== Pennsylvania ====
- Harrah's Philadelphia, Chester
- Hollywood Casino at The Meadows, North Strabane Township
- Mohegan Pennsylvania, Wilkes-Barre

Virginia

- Shenandoah Downs, Woodstock

== Uruguay ==
- Hipodromo Municipal de Las Piedras, Las Piedras
- Hipodromo Nacional de Maroñas, Montevideo

== Venezuela ==
- Hipodromo de Santa Rita, Santa Rita, Zulia (near Maracaibo)
- Hipodromo de Valencia, Valencia, Carabobo
- Hipodromo La Rinconada, Caracas
- Hipodromo Rancho Alegre, Ciudad Bolívar, Bolívar

== Vietnam ==
- Phú Thọ Hippodrome, Ho Chi Minh City

== Zimbabwe ==
- Borrowdale Park, Harare

== See also ==
- List of horse racing venues by capacity
- Lists of sports venues
- Lists of stadiums
