= Track surface =

Material a horse racing track is made of

The track surface of a horse racing track refers to the material of which the track is made. There are three types of track surfaces used in modern horse racing. These are:

- Turf, the most common track surface in Europe
- Dirt, the most common track surface in the US
- Artificial or Synthetic, the collective term for a number of proprietary man-made surfaces in use at a number of locations around the world.

The style of racing differs between surfaces, with dirt races tending to have the fastest pace, while turf racing often comes down to a sprint in the stretch. Races on artificial surfaces tend to play out somewhere in between. Anecdotally, American bettors consider dirt racing to be more predictable, which makes it a more popular medium for betting purposes. Weather conditions affect the speed of the different surfaces too, and grading systems have been developed to indicate the track condition (known as the "going" in the UK and Ireland). Turf surfaces are the most affected by changes in the weather, and many turf horses will have a strong preference for a specific type of going.

== Synthetic surfaces ==
Synthetic surfaces allow racing to take place in bad weather conditions, when it may otherwise be cancelled, and for this reason are sometimes referred to as all-weather surfaces. Manufacturers of synthetic racetrack surface materials promote the fact that synthetic tracks have drainage attributes that are better than natural surfaces.

There is also evidence that synthetic surfaces are significantly safer than dirt in terms of equine breakdowns, though there are many variables that come into play. The statistics for North America in 2015 showed 1.18 fatalities per 1,000 starts on synthetic surfaces, 1.22 on grass courses, and 1.78 on dirt tracks. The breakdown rates were down for each of the surfaces compared to 2014.

The first synthetic surface used for thoroughbred racing was Tropical Park's Tartan turf, a synthetic surface similar to Astroturf, installed in 1966. Tartan turf was never a success with horsemen.

The first synthetic surface to replace dirt in the United States was installed at the Meadows Racetrack and Casino in Washington, Pennsylvania, United States, in 1963. This surface, called Tartan, was found to be unsatisfactory and removed and replaced with a traditional limestone surface in 1975.

Name	Manufacturer	Country	Description	Installations
Cushion Track	Equestrian Surfaces	(United Kingdom)	Sand, synthetic fibers, elastic fiber coated with wax. The footing is approximately 7 in (180 mm) deep, followed by a geotextile membrane/tarmac.	Santa Anita Park (replaced) Hollywood Park (closed down); Courbold Park, Sunshine Coast; Toowoomba, Queensland^{[A]} Klampenborg, Denmark; Taby Galopp, Sweden (closed); Al Khor Horse Breeders Park, Qatar
Fibresand	Mansfield Sand Company	(United Kingdom)	Sand particles and polypropylene fibres.	Southwell (until 2021); Pyatigorsk (ru)
Polytrack	Martin Collins Enterprises	(United Kingdom)	A mixture of silica sand, recycled synthetic fibers (carpet and spandex) and recycled rubber/pvc. In cold climates, the mixture may also include jelly cable (plastic insulation from copper phone wire). The entire mixture is coated with wax.	Lingfield Park; Kempton Park; Chelmsford City; Dundalk; Chantilly; Marseille-Vivaux; Pau (CLOPF); Kranji, Mijas(CLOPF); Veliefendi; Arlington Park (Closed); Del Mar Racetrack (replaced); Keeneland Race Course (replaced); Pakenham Racecourse, VIC; Cagnes Sur Mer Racecourse; Deauville-La Touques Racecourse; Gokdere & Bedew Racecourses in Ashgabat, Turkmenistan; Fairview Racecourse; Greyville, Durban South Africa Cambridge and Riccarton Park Racecourse, New Zealand
Pro-Ride	Pro-Ride Racing Australia Pty Ltd	(Australia)	6 in (150 mm) of footing (sand, nylon fibres, Spandex fibres coated in a polymeric binder) on top of a 4 in (100 mm) IMC layer (sand and nylon fibres) on top of a drainage system.	Flemington; Santa Anita (removed); Rosehill Racecourse, NSW; Warwick Farm Racecourse, NSW
Tapeta	Michael Dickinson, Inc.	(United States)	Sand, fibre, rubber and wax makes up the top 4–7 in (100–180 mm) of the racing surface, installed on top of either porous asphalt or a geotextile membrane.	Spreyton; Golden Gate Fields (Closed); Presque Isle Downs; Wolverhampton; Newcastle; Woodbine; Dubai Racecourse Meydan (removed); Turfway Park; Gulfstream Park Belmont Park; Southwell (from 2021)
Visco-Ride		(Australia)	Sand and fibre coated in wax	Flemington, Victoria (removed); Cranbourne Racecourse, Victoria (removed); Warwick Farm Racecourse, New South Wales (removed) Lyon La Soie (France) Pornichet (France)
EquiPolitrek	Visteks Ltd	(Russia)	A mixture of silica sand, recycled synthetic fibers (carpet and spandex) and chopped geotextile. The surface keeps the exploitation characteristics in a wide temperature range: −40 °C to +100 °С. The entire mixture is coated with wax.	Akbuzat Race Track (First in 2007, Renewed in 2021); International Equestrian Complex, Kazan (First in 2005, Renewed in 2020); International Equestrian Complex, Pradar; Equestrian Complex, Jump; Equestrian Complex, Nimb; Equestrian Complex, Sady Pridoniya

1. ^{↑}Toowoomba has converted 1/2 the synthetic track into turf and have the all-weather track as a training track
