= Noel Whitcomb =

English journalist (1918–1993)

Noel Bernard Whitcomb (25 December 1918 - 11 June 1993) was an English journalist and the founder of the Daily Mirror Punters' Club.

== Early life ==
Whitcomb was born on Christmas Day 1918 and was educated by the Society of Jesus at Farnham. He served in the Royal Artillery during World War II, but his service was curtailed by Tuberculosis.

== Early career ==
Whitcomb worked for a film trade magazine the Daily Renter before joining the Daily Mirror. He famously discovered a ‘talking’ Jack Russell Terrier. By 1947 he had his own Daily Mirror column, 'Looking at the Lousy World and Seeing the Funny Side'. By 1953, Whitcomb had a full-page column and another on London night life.

== Daily Mirror Punters' Club ==
Whitcomb owned a number of race horses: Heidelberg, winner on the flat, over hurdles and fences; Even Up, who won 14 races; Royal Fanfare, a prolific winner in England, France and Spain; and Mirror Boy, who won the Andy Capp Handicap in 1980.

He was the Founder President of the successful Daily Mirror Punters' Club. The Daily Mirror Punters' Club was established to enable members to enjoy more affordable admission to racecourses in Britain and throughout the world, making Horse racing more accessible. Within five years, the Daily Mirror Punters’ Club had over 500,000 members.

An account of a number of the foreign tours on which Whitcomb accompanied members of the Daily Mirror Punters' Club is included in When Next the Tropic Sun? The book is authored by David Johnson, the travel agent who organised the tours for the Daily Mirror Punters' Club and who himself came from a family which had owned racehorses including Sceptre (co-owned with Robert Sevier).

Whitcomb's career at the Daily Mirror came to an end in 1980, reportedly when its new owner, Robert Maxwell, objected to his expense account.

A detailed account of Whitcomb's career and the establishment of the Daily Mirror Punters' Club is included in his autobiography, A Particular Kind of Fool. The title of Whitcomb's autobiography was derived from a quotation from his hero Evelyn Waugh: Most fools can get a book published, but it takes a particular kind of fool to hold down a job on a daily newspaper.

== See also ==
- Daily Mirror
- Horse racing
- Journalism
- List of horse racing venues
- List of jockeys
- Robert Maxwell
