= Akbuzat Race Track =

Horse racing course in Ufa, Russia

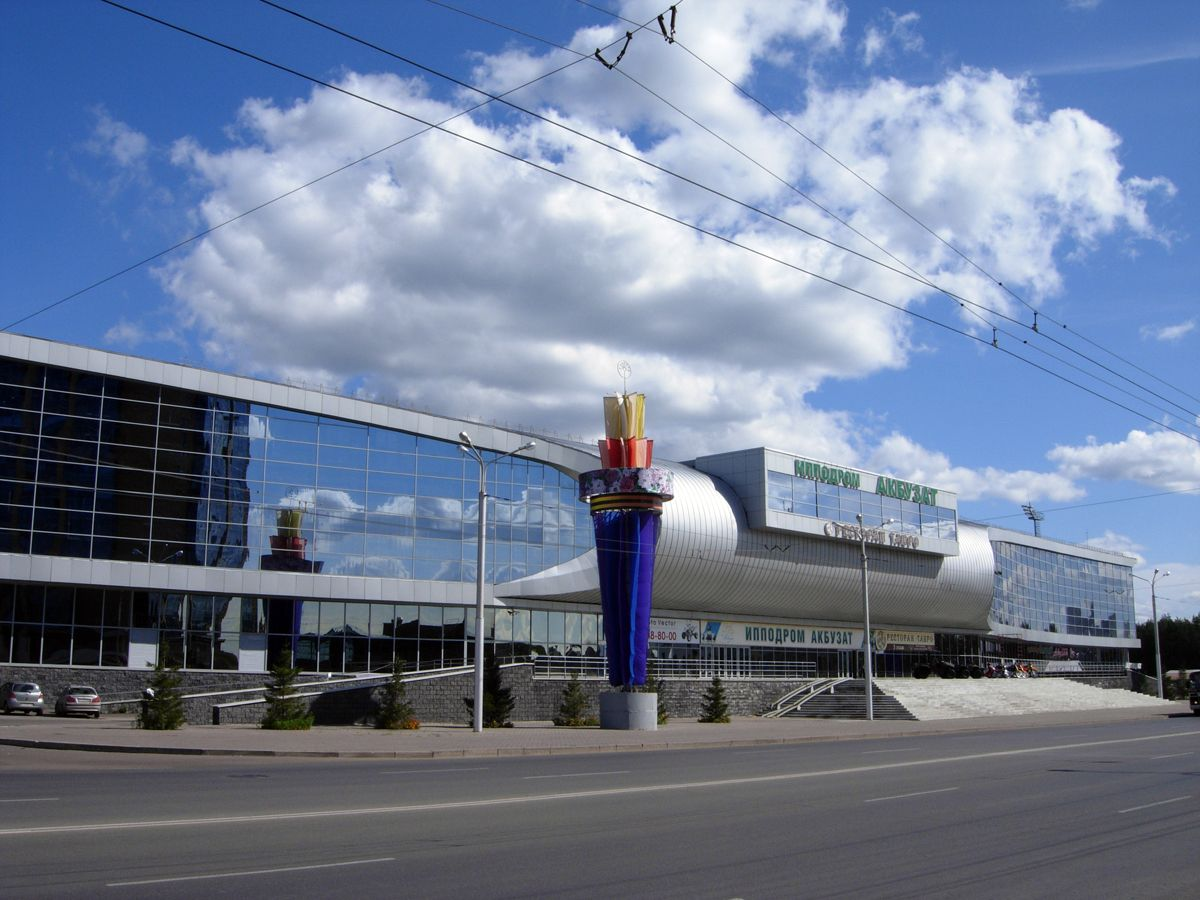
- Location: Ufa, Bashkortostan, Russia
- Coordinates: 54.752474°N 56.035549°E
- Owned by: Government of Bashkortostan
- Date opened: 1982

Akbuzat Race Track is a horse racing facility in Ufa, Bashkortostan, Russia built by the Government of Bashkortostan and inaugurated in 1982. The race track had been named to honor of Akbuzat which of winged or swift horse in Bashkir mythology. Akbuzat is considered ancestor of Tulpars too.

The race track had been renamed in 2009 to honor of Tagir Kusimov but name Tagir Kusimov Akbuzat Race Track never caught on with the general public.

== Transport ==
- №110
- №251 Ufa Station→ Kashkadan Park (Sipailovo neighbourhood)
