= Santa Rosa Park =

Horse racing track in Trinidad and Tobago

Santa Rosa Park is a thoroughbred race track at Arima, Trinidad and Tobago. It is currently the country's only race track and hosts all of Trinidad's major races, including The Royal Oak Derby, Guineas, President's Cup and Midsummer Classic.

The racetrack, operated by Arima Race Club and governed by the Trinidad and Tobago Betting Levy Board and Trinidad and Tobago Racing Authority is the region's premier home of horse racing. The track hosts weekly live horse racing (usually on a Saturday) and most major public holidays. Yearly, an average of forty five (45) race days are held.

Arima Race Club also operates multiple OTB (Off track betting) shops. The OTB shops are open six days a week offering simulcast horse racing of international race tracks including American, English, and Irish tracks.
