= Mäntyvaara =

Coordinates: 66.8253°N 21.7031°E

Mäntyvaara is a village and hill in the Swedish municipality of Gällivare. The village lies on the south slope of the hill.
