= Lismore Turf Club =

Horse racing venue in Lismore, New South Wales

Lismore Turf Club is a horse racing venue in Lismore, New South Wales, Australia.

The racecourse holds numerous Thoroughbred racehorse meetings each year. The feature event is the annual Lismore Cup, which is held on the last Friday of September, having shifted in 2024 from Thursday.

The grass track can hold various distances up to 2100m. The ground has a large members stand, and grassed areas to view the track from. Most meetings held at the track have full TAB coverage, with on-site bookmakers and totalisator facilities available.

A function centre on-site often holds events such as parties, weddings and business meetings.
