= Almaty hippodrome =

Equestrian sports facility in Almaty, Kazakhstan

- Location: 10А Omarova Street, Almaty, Kazakhstan
- Coordinates: 43°18′40″N 76°55′44″E

Construction
- Opened: 1930
- Renovated: 1965; 1980

Almaty hippodrome (Kazakh: Алматыдағы ипподром, romanized: Almatydağy ippodrom; Russian: Алматинский ипподром, tr. almatinskii ippodrom) is a hippodrome opened in 1930 in Almaty, Kazakhstan. It is the oldest active sports facility for equestrian sport in the country.

== History ==
The Almaty hippodrome was founded in March 1930. The original location of the hippodrome was on "Sennaya Square" ("Sennaya Bazaar") in the square of Iliyskaya (Mametova street), Lepinskaya (Nazarbayeva street), Sergiopolskaya (Tulebaeva street) and Tokmakskaya streets. In 1934, the hippodrome was merged with the "State Factory Stables" and was placed in northern part of the city on Lesnaya street (now Omarova street).

During the Great Patriotic War, the hippodrome remained in operation and supplied horses for the formation of cavalry units.

In 1965, the Almaty Hippodrome for the first time became the place of the All-Union competitions. The reconstruction of the hippodrome was carried out for this event. Later such competitions were held regularly (1968, 1970, 1974, 1980, 1982). The parade of participants of the All-Union competitions began in the city and all the participants were riding through the streets of the city to the hippodrome.

In 1980, a major reconstruction of the hippodrome was done: the stands, racecourses, racetracks and the equestrian yard were renovated. Only two hippodromes in the entire USSR were equipped as well as the Almaty hippodrome - in Pyatigorsk, and in Moscow.

The heyday of the Republican Hippodrome in Almaty came in the Soviet period and lasted until the early 1990s. The hippodrome annually hosted traditional competitions for the prize of the Ministry of Agriculture of the Kazakh SSR, equestrian sports festivals, training sessions of the Republican Equestrian School of High Mastery in the national equestrian sports games.

In the 1990s, the hippodrome was withdrawn from the funding of the Ministry of Agriculture and remained unowned. There were virtually no races, the stables and grandstands were falling into disrepair.

In late 2000, private horse breeders made an appearance. A community of horse owners and horse breeders enthusiasts created the "Jockey Club" and bought the Almaty Hippodrome. During the several years of reconstruction, the stands and the racetrack were restored, the horse yard was renovated, starting boxes were purchased and new stables were built.

By 2008, the beginning of the economic crisis coincided with a ban on betting. "The Jockey Club" went bankrupt, and the racetrack was put up for auction, where it was bought by "Tengri-Invest" LLP. Due to regular power and water outages, the veterinary clinic moved to another location.

In 2015, the hippodrome was sold at auction. Initially it was planned that a residential complex would be built on the territory of the sports facility, but later this information was denied. Of the entire complex, only dilapidated stables on an area of 6.5 hectares will be demolished.

Racing at the racetrack resumed in 2016.

In 2018, the hippodrome and the Sayran Bus Station were included in the preliminary list of monuments of architecture, which will preserve the sports facility.

The Almaty Hippodrome has set more than 100 records of speed since its foundation.

During the racing season, about 200 horses can participate in the competitions at the hippodrome at the same time. The development of children's equestrian sport is taking place and in 2020 competitions with the participation of 16 children were held. In 2021, it is planned to hold two starts in a new discipline - working dressage.

Due to the support of the Akimat in holding competitions for horses born in Kazakhstan, new horse farms started to appear around Almaty.

== Main features ==
The area of the hippodrome is 42 ha. It has two prize and two working tracks for riding and trotting horses, an area for various equestrian competitions and games, a stand for 3000 seats. Trotting horses tracks have an artificial surface, which allows to hold training all year round.

As part of the reconstruction of the 1980s, a 2,000-meter long, 16-meter wide and 1.2-meter deep racetrack was built at the racetrack. This is a very complex construction, in which different materials - large fractions, then smaller ones - necessary for traumatic-free testing of the horses were poured.

Prior to the transfer of the hippodrome to private ownership, the following buildings were located and worked on its territory: stables for 500 people, a veterinary clinic, a swimming pool for bathing horses, a smithy, a horse-rolling station, a hotel, a restaurant "Tulpar" and a museum of horse breeding.

Currently, the site accommodates the following facilities: Riding School, Equestrian School of High Sportsmanship and equestrian equipment store.

Almaty Hippodrome is the only hippodrome in Kazakhstan certified according to world standards.

== Monument status ==
On 19 March 2019, the Almaty Hippodrome was granted the status of a monument and architecture and urban planning with inclusion in the State List of Historical and Cultural Monuments of Local Significance in Almaty.
