= Tagir Kusimov =

Soviet major general (1909–1986)

Tagir Taipovich Kusimov
- Born: 14 February 1909; Kusimovo, Russian Empire (now in the Republic of Bashkortostan, Russian Federation)
- Died: 10 May 1986 (aged 76); Ufa, Bashkir Autonomous SSR, Russian SFSR, Soviet Union (now in the Republic of Bashkortostan, Russian Federation)
- Burial place: Muslim Cemetery, Ufa
- Spouse: Saida Mustafievna (died in 1987)
- Military career
- Allegiance: Soviet Union
- Branch: Red Army / Soviet Army
- Service years: 1928–1969
- Rank: Major-general
- Units: 56th Cavalry Regiment (1940–1941); 23rd Cavalry Regiment (1941–1942); 275th Cavalry Regiment / 58th Guards Cavalry Regiment (1942–1944); 4th Separate Guards Kuban Cossack Cavalry Division (1947–1949); 24th Mountain Rifle Division (1951–1953); 9th Mountain Rifle Division (1953–1954); 376th Mountain Rifle Division (1954–1956); 58th Motor Rifle Division (1956–1961)
- Conflicts: World War II; Anglo-Soviet invasion of Iran; Battle of the Dnieper
- Awards: Hero of the Soviet Union
- Other work: Deputy of the Supreme Soviet of the RSFSR (1947–1951); Deputy of the Supreme Soviet of Turkmen SSR (1959–1963); Deputy of the Supreme Soviet of the Bashkir ASSR (1967–1971)

Tagir Taipovich Kusimov (Russian: Таги́р Таи́пович Куси́мов, Bashkir: Таһир Таип улы Кусимов; 14 February 1909 – 10 May 1986) was a Soviet military leader of Bashkir origin.

A career cavalry soldier and officer since joining the Red Army in 1928, Kusimov won the honorary title of Hero of the Soviet Union as a colonel in the 58th Guards Cavalry Regiment of the 16th Guards Cavalry Division in 1944 for his command of the 58th during the Battle of the Dnieper in 1943.

Promoted to major-general after World War II, he held various positions in the Soviet Army and Communist Party and was elected to the supreme soviets of the Russian SFSR, Turkmen SSR, and Bashkir ASSR.

== Biography ==
Tagir Taipovich Kusimov was born to a peasant family of Bashkir origin in Kusimovo, Russian Empire (now in the Republic of Bashkortostan, Russian Federation) in 1909. Kusimov began his military service in the Red Army in 1928. He joined the Communist Party in 1932.

A cavalry officer commanding the 14th Cavalry Regiment of the 23rd Cavalry Division in the Caucasus at the time of the German invasion of the Soviet Union in 1941, Major Kusimov led the 14th Cavalry into Iran across the Aras River during the joint Anglo-Soviet invasion in August 1941. The cavalrymen encountered no resistance in securing the border around the Aramas and, continuing to move southward, easily took thousands of Iranian war prisoners in a campaign aimed at toppling the pro-German government of Rezā Shāh in favor of a pro-Allied one.

Major Kusimov was next appointed commander of the 275th Cavalry Regiment of the 112th Bashkir Cavalry Division (later redesignated as the 58th Guards Cavalry Regiment of the 16th Guards Cavalry Division), which joined the Soviet forces fighting off the invasion in April 1942.

The division was directed to assist the defenders of the Stalingrad in October 1942. Kusimov was wounded in the leg in the ensuing combat and sent out of the combat zone to Ufa to recuperate.

Kusimov's regiment distinguished itself during the Lower Dnieper Offensive. Having reached the Dnieper River in its pursuit of the Germans on 26 September 1943, the regiment forced its way across on 27 September in the face of German artillery and mortar with negligible losses. The regiment proceeded to hold out as the rest of the division made its way across.

Recommended by General Konstantin Rokossovsky for the supreme honorary title of Hero of the Soviet Union for the success at the Dnieper, Colonel Kusimov was awarded the title along with the Gold Star of the Hero of the Soviet Union (medal no. 3013) and Order of Lenin by the Presidium of the Supreme Soviet of the USSR on 15 January 1944.

Colonel Kusimov was transferred to study at the Frunze Military Academy by Marshal Semyon Budyonny in 1944 and graduated from the Frunze Military Academy in 1947, taking part in the Moscow Victory Parade on 24 June 1945. He graduated from the Voroshilov Military Academy of the USSR Army General Staff in 1951, subsequently rising to the rank of major-general.

Major-general Kusimov served in the Soviet Army until 1969 and was concurrently elected to various party and government posts. He served on three Soviet legislatures: the Supreme Soviet of the Russian SFSR in 1947-1951, the Supreme Soviet of the Turkmen SSR in 1959-1963, and the Supreme Soviet of the Bashkir ASSR in 1967-1971. He was a delegate to the 23rd Congress of the Communist Party of the Soviet Union in 1966.

Tagir Kusimov died in Ufa on 10 May 1986. His body was interred at the city's Muslim Cemetery.

A museum honoring the Bashkir war hero and general exists in his native Bashkortostan.

== Honours and awards ==
- Hero of the Soviet Union (15 January 1944)
- Order of Lenin (twice)
- Order of the Red Banner
- Order of Suvorov 3rd class
- Order of the Patriotic War 1st class
- Order of the Red Star (twice)
