= Keskinen =

Keskinen is a Finnish surname. Notable people with the surname include:

- Esa Keskinen (born 1965), Finnish hockey player
- Jouko Keskinen (born 1950), Finnish actor
- Maggie Keskinen (born 1990), Finnish politician
- Sylvi Keskinen (1933–2013), Finnish hurdler
- Topi Keskinen (born 2003), Finnish footballer
