= Xħajma Racetrack =

Horse racecourse

Coordinates: 36°02′16″N 14°16′00″E

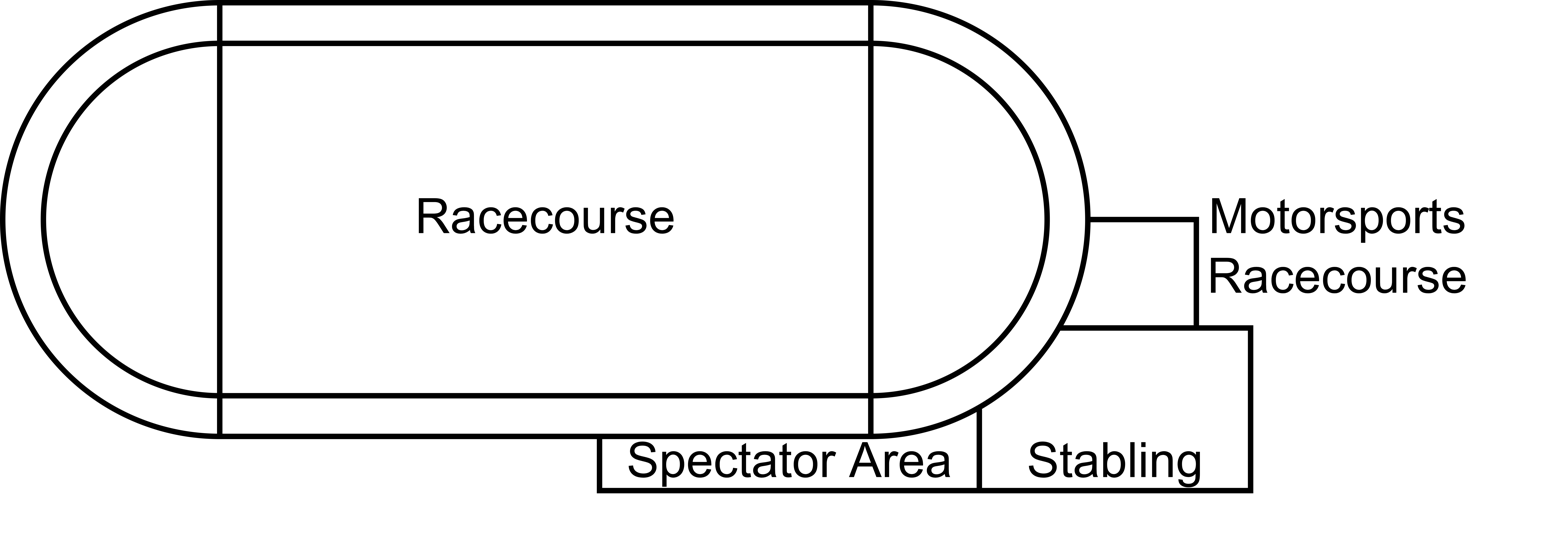
A diagram showcasing the racecourse layout

The Xħajma Racetrack is a horse racecourse in Xewkija on the island of Gozo, Malta. It spans about 1 kilometre (0.62 mi). When it comes to horse racing, the local approach is more in line with the Roman chariot form, in which the rider sits on a two-wheeled gig driven by a horse. The Gozo Horse Association organizes regular and exceptional events. Races are typically conducted every two weeks on weekends, but the yearly schedule also includes special events such as Arka races, Bailey's Heats and Kraft Heats. A general upgrade was planned in 2011, which included overall cleaning, the increasing of safety precautions and the renovation of the entrance and offices. In order to celebrate world children's day in 2014, the racetrack also hosted numerous activities intended to be enjoyed by a younger audience. Apart from this, model airplanes are sometimes flown near the racetrack. Racing takes place every Sunday from October to May and intermittently over the summer. Races are every about 10 minutes and there are classic trotting horses, ponies, Shetland and more. In July and August 2022, the racetrack was enamored in a controversy regarding animal cruelty after pictures were released showcasing horses struggling in the summer heat.
