= Nikula =

Nikula is a Finnish surname.

== Geographical distribution ==
As of 2014, 52.3% of all known bearers of the surname Nikula were residents of Finland (frequency 1:2,320), 25.6% of Ukraine (1:39,331), 6.4% of the United States (1:1,245,694), 4.3% of Sweden (1:50,756), 2.1% of Hungary (1:104,430), 1.3% of Canada (1:634,448), 1.3% of Russia (1:2,531,424) and 1.2% of the Democratic Republic of the Congo (1:1,343,291).

In Finland, the frequency of the surname was higher than national average (1:2,320) in the following regions:

1. Central Ostrobothnia (1:481)
2. North Ostrobothnia (1:615)
3. Lapland (1:1,025)
4. Åland (1:1,196)
5. Kymenlaakso (1:1,295)
6. Southwest Finland (1:2,004)

== Notable people ==
- Jone Nikula (born 1970), Finnish television and radio personality
- Paavo Nikula (1942–2024), Finnish politician
- Pentti Nikula (1939–2025), Finnish pole vaulter
- Riitta Nikula (born 1944), Finnish art historian
