= Ippodromo della Favorita =

Horse racing venue in Palermo, Sicily, Italy

Coordinates: 38.1519°N 13.3453°E

- Location: Palermo, Sicily
- Date opened: 1953
- Capacity: 15,000 (incl. 2,500 seated)
- Notable races: Gran Premio Trinacria, Coppa degli Assi

Ippodromo della Favorita (English: La Favorita Hippodrome) is a horse racing venue in Palermo, Sicily, Italy built in 1953. It is located next to the Stadio Renzo Barbera in the southernmost part of Parco della Favorita, Palermo's largest urban park.

Access to the venue is free of charge, it has a maximum audience capacity of 15,000, of which 2,500 places are seated. Adjacent to the hippodrome, various facilities can be found, such as 2 parking areas for visitors, a playground for children, as well as various restaurants.

The hippodrome is divided in two areas: the actual racing track is 1,000 metres long and 25 metres wide, while the exercise track is located within the actual racing track and is 800 metres long.

The stables sector has 400 placements for horses, as well as staff accommodation, a veterinary station, additional car parking and food stalls.

In 2024, the venue held the 43rd edition of its flagship event, the Gran Premio Trinacria. Later that year, the public prosecutor in Sicily indicted the operators of the Ippodromo for charges of extortion and mafia ties.
