= Swedish Ski Games =

Cross-country skiing event in Sweden

Swedish Ski Games Svenska skidspelen
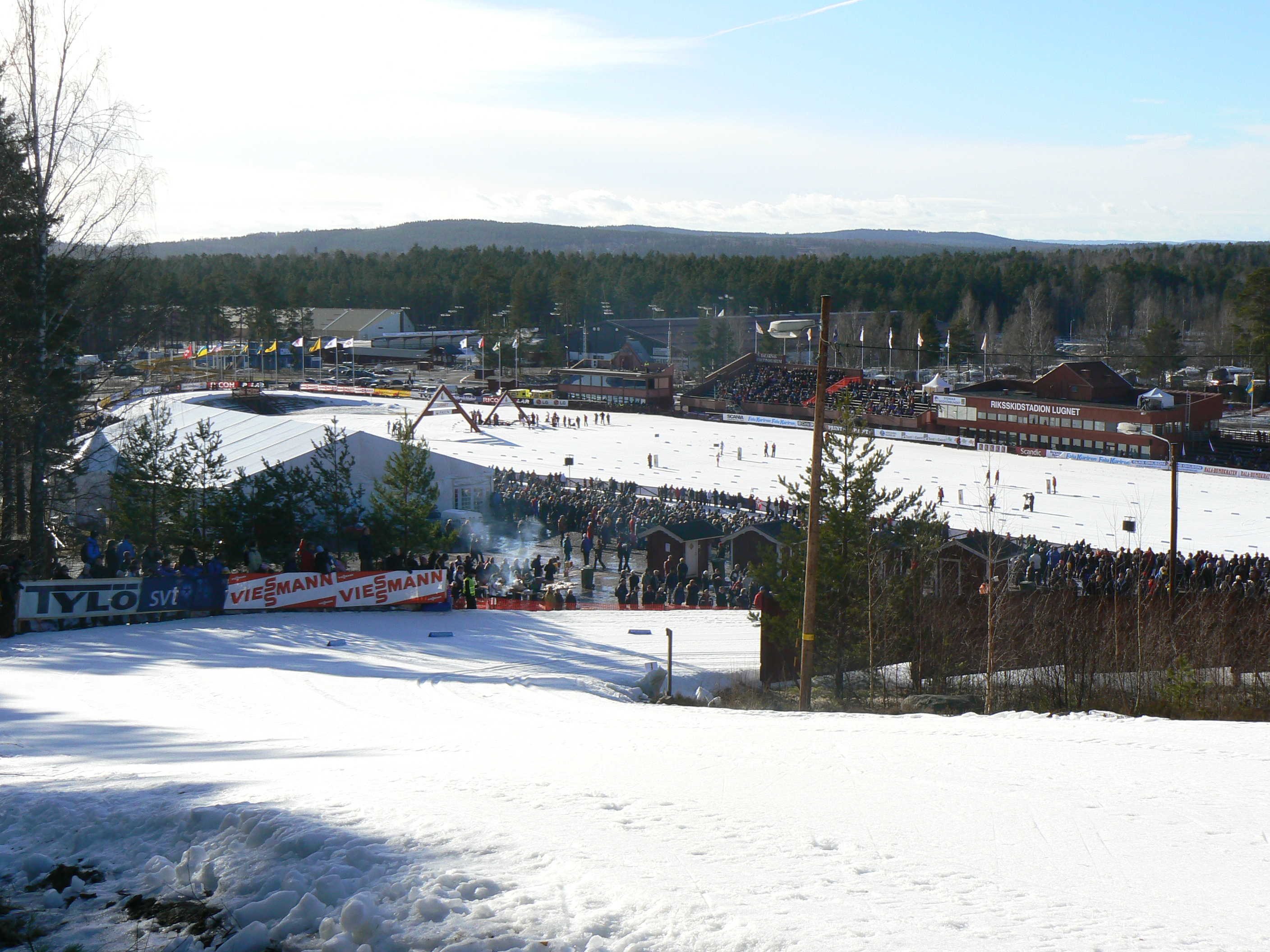
- Lugnet during the 2008 event
- Status: active
- Genre: sporting event
- Date: February–March
- Frequency: annual
- Venue: Lugnet
- Location: Falun
- Country: Sweden
- Inaugurated: 1947

The Swedish Ski Games (Swedish: Svenska skidspelen) is an annual cross-country skiing event in Sweden. The games started in Sundsvall in 1947 but moved to Falun in 1959. Up to 1991, ski jumping and Nordic combined skiing were also included as a recurring event. Included were also alpine skiing between 1950 and 1953 (in Åre) and biathlon in 1984. Since 1992, the Swedish Ski Games has arranged international cross-country skiing events only. The event is usually held in February–March as one of the final World Cup competitions during the season. The event is usually held at Lugnet. Lack of snow has sometimes required the event to be moved to other places.

== History ==
Inspired by Norwegian skiing events Holmennkollrennene (Holmenkollen Ski Festival) and Finnish Lahti Ski Games, the Swedish Ski Games were created in 1947. In the inaugural games, only four nations; Sweden, Norway, Finland and Switzerland attended. In the early years, several venues alternated as host of the games. As a result of a 1957 proposal from the skiing association of Dalarna, Falun took over as hosts; first on trial from 1959 to 1962, later on a permanent basis. In 1979, the Swedish Ski Games was part of the unofficial World Cup season. Since the official FIS Cross-Country World Cup began with the 1981–82 season, the Swedish Ski Games has been included every year with exceptions of years hosting the Nordic World Ski Championships instead. Ski jumping and Nordic combined were included at the program until 1991.

== Events ==
- 1947 – Sundsvall
- 1948 – Östersund
- 1949 – Sollefteå
- 1950 – Östersund
- 1951 – Sundsvall
- 1952 – Falun
- 1953 – Boden
- 1954 – Falun (combined with the World Ski Championships)
- 1955 – Stockholm-Nässjö
- 1956 – Falun
- 1957 – Sollefteå
- 1958 – No competitions held
- 1959 – Falun
- 1960 – Falun/Sälen/Transtrand
- 1961 – Falun
- 1962 – Falun/Bjursås
- 1963 – Falun
- 1964 – Kiruna
- 1965 – Falun
- 1966 – Umeå/Örnsköldsvik
- 1967 – Falun
- 1968 – Falun
- 1969 – Falun
- 1970 – Falun
- 1971 – Falun/Bjursås
- 1972 – Lycksele
- 1973 – Falun
- 1974 – Falun (combined with the World Ski Championships)
- 1975 – Falun
- 1976 – Falun
- 1977 – Falun
- 1978 – Falun
- 1979 – Falun
- 1980 – Falun (women's 20 kilometers world championship)
- 1981 – Falun
- 1982 – Falun
- 1983 – Falun
- 1984 – Falun
- 1985 – Falun
- 1986 – Falun
- 1987 – Falun
- 1988 – Falun
- 1989 – Falun
- 1990 – Lycksele/Örnsköldsvik
- 1991 – Falun
- 1992 – Falun
- 1993 – Falun (combined with the World Ski Championships)
- 1994 – Falun
- 1995 – Falun
- 1996 – Falun
- 1997 – Falun
- 1998 – Falun
- 1999 – Falun
- 2000 – Falun
- 2001 – Falun
- 2002 – Falun
- 2003 – Falun
- 2004 – Falun
- 2005 – Falun
- 2006 – Falun
- 2007 – Falun
- 2008 – Falun
- 2009 – Falun
- 2010 – Falun
- 2011 – Falun
- 2012 – Falun
- 2013 – Falun
- 2014 – Falun
- 2015 – Falun (combined with the World Ski Championships)
- 2016 – Falun
- 2017 – Falun
- 2018 – Falun
- 2019 – Falun
- 2020 – Falun
- 2021 – Falun

== See also ==
- Holmenkollen Ski Festival
- Lahti Ski Games
