= Wuxi Grand Theatre =

Theatre in Wuxi, China

Coordinates: 31.5169°N 120.2745°E

Wuxi Grand Theatre is one of the key cultural projects in Wuxi, China. Wuxi Grand Theater stands on the south bank of Taihu Lake and covers a total area of more than 70,000 square meters. The building is designed by Finnish architect Pekka Salminen.
