= Marienkirche, Neubrandenburg =

Coordinates: 53°33′20″N 13°15′37″E

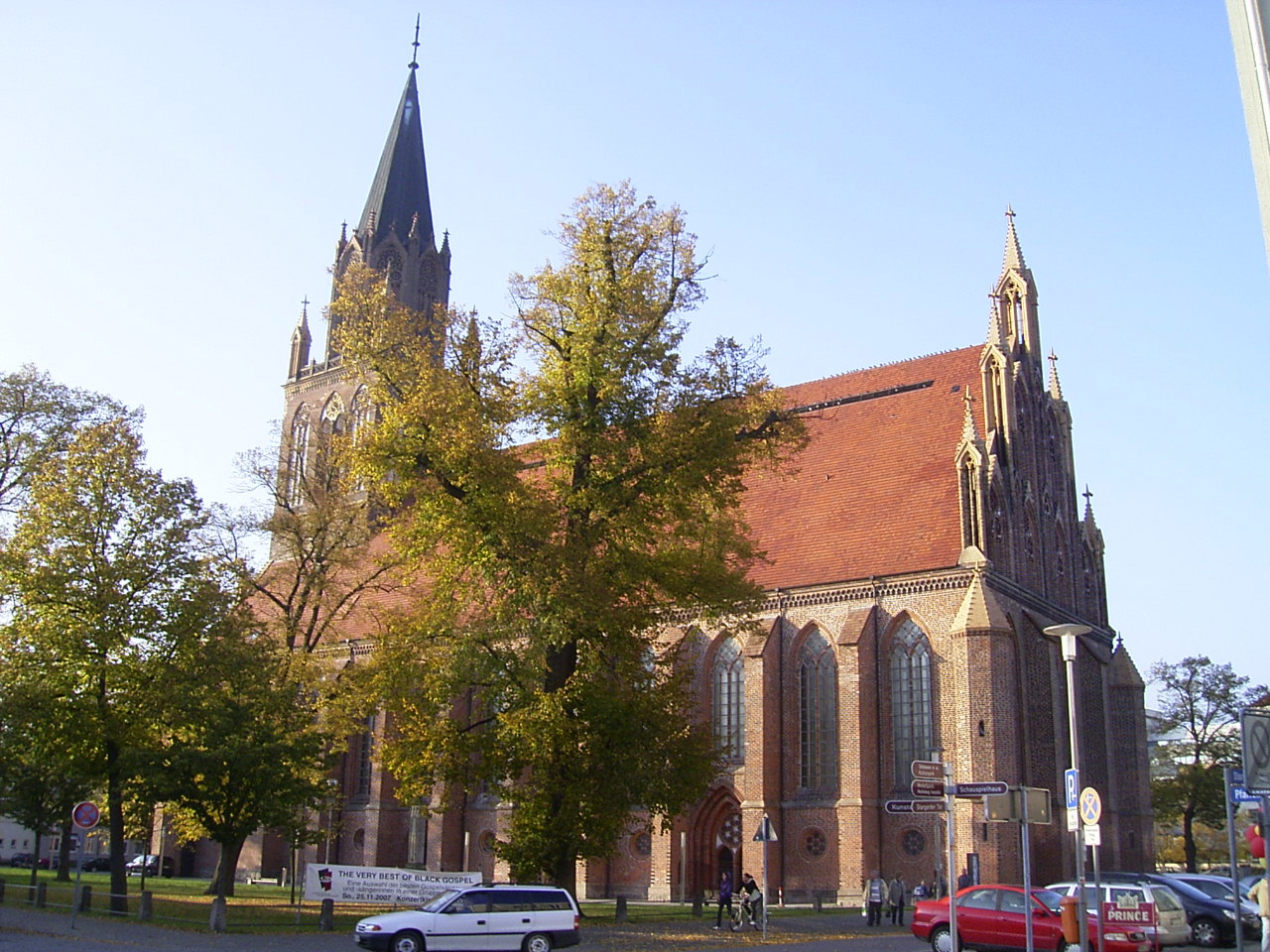
Marienkirche, Neubrandenburg

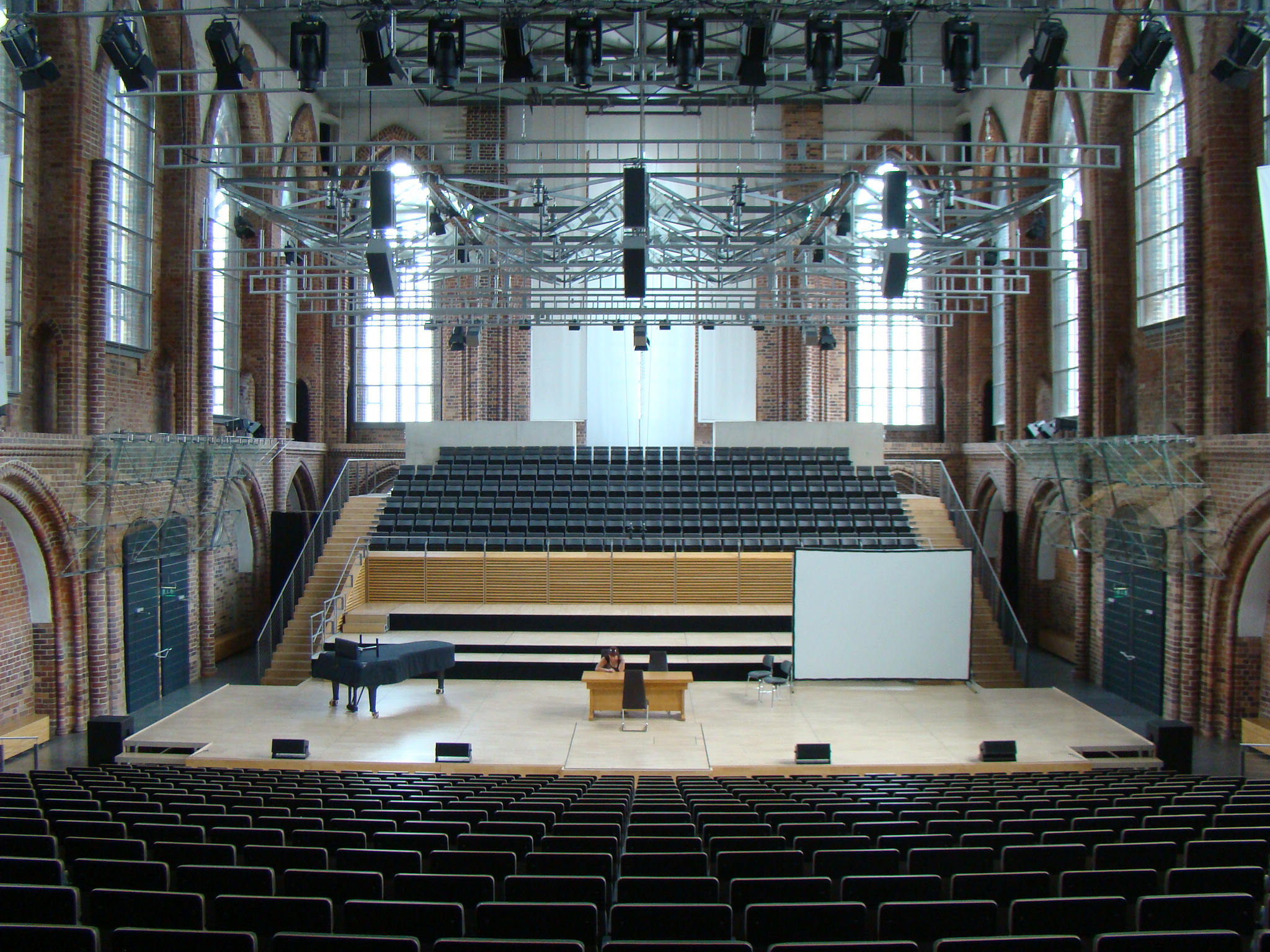
Modern interior insertion designed by Pekka Salminen

Marienkirche (St. Mary's Church), a hall church in the North German red brick Gothic style, completed in 1298, was the main church of the city of Neubrandenburg. It has been transformed into a concert hall, designed by Pekka Salminen, which opened in 2001. It then was rededicated as the Konzertkirche (Concert Church). It is widely known for its renowned Philharmony (Neubrandenburger Philharmonie).

== History ==
The Marienkirche, which had been badly damaged in the 17th and 18th centuries, was repaired and rebuilt from 1832 to 1841. In the final days of World War II, it was again seriously damaged. The town of Neubrandenburg decided to convert the ruined church into a concert hall, and restored and renovated it in the 1980s and 1990s. A European architectural competition was arranged in 1996. The implemented plan is based on the winning proposal of Finnish architect Pekka Salminen.

== Architecture of the concert hall ==
The church hall is divided by an acoustic wall (which also acts as a fire screen) into a foyer and a shoebox-shaped concert hall. The hall is implemented in the old walls as a "house within a house", keeping the historic parts visible. A suspended glass ceiling made of glass pyramids in different shapes enhances the acoustics of the hall.

The concert hall also serves other functions. Depending on the setup, it has up to 1,100 seats.

== Literature ==
- Jacob Friedrich Roloff: Erinnerungen an Friedrich Wilhelm Buttel. Commissionsverlag Gustav Lange, Berlin 1870 (in German)
- Volker Schmidt: Neubrandenburg. Ein historischer Führer. Hinstorff, Rostock 1997, ISBN 3-356-00726-2, pp. 85–87. (in German)
