= Neubrandenburg =

City in Mecklenburg-Vorpommern, Germany

- City
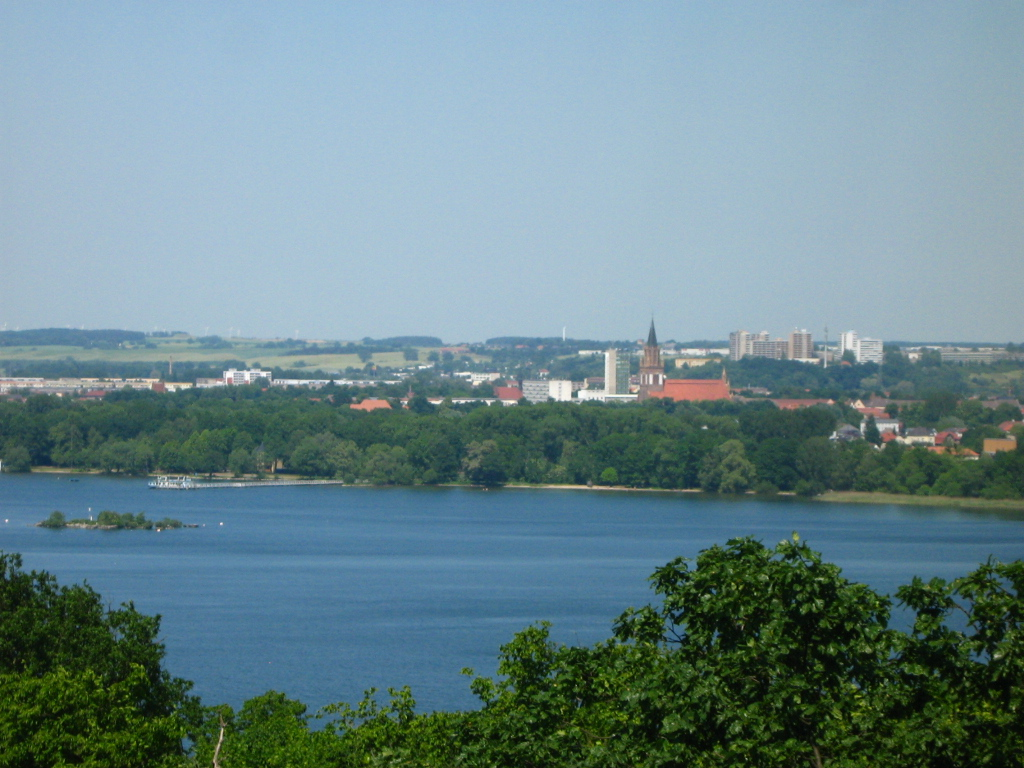
- Neubrandenburg skyline with Tollensesee

- Flag Coat of arms

- Location of Neubrandenburg within Mecklenburgische Seenplatte district
- Interactive map of Neubrandenburg
- Location within Germany Location within Mecklenburg-Vorpommern
- Coordinates: 53°33′25″N 13°15′40″E
- Country: Germany
- State: Mecklenburg-Vorpommern
- District: Mecklenburgische Seenplatte
- Subdivisions: 10 Stadtteile

Government
  - Mayor (2022–29): Silvio Witt (Ind.)

Area
  - Total: 86.11 km^{2} (33.25 sq mi)
- Elevation: 20 m (66 ft)

Population (2025-12-31)
  - Total: 59,494
  - Density: 690.9/km^{2} (1,789/sq mi)
- Time zone: UTC+01:00 (CET)
  - Summer (DST): UTC+02:00 (CEST)
- Postal codes: 17033, 17034, 17036, 17050
- Dialling codes: 0395
- Vehicle registration: NB
- Website: www.neubrandenburg.de

Neubrandenburg (German: [nɔʏˈbʁandn̩bʊʁk]; Low German: Niegenbramborg; lit. 'New Brandenburg') is a city in the southeast of Mecklenburg-Vorpommern, Germany. It is located on the shore of the lake Tollensesee and forms the urban centre of the Mecklenburg Lakeland.

The city is famous for its rich medieval heritage of Brick Gothic architecture, including the world's best preserved defensive wall of this style as well as a Concert Church (Saint Mary), the home venue of the Neubrandenburg Philharmonic. It is part of the European Route of Brick Gothic, a route which leads through seven countries along the Baltic Sea coast. Neubrandenburg is nicknamed for its four medieval city gates - Stadt der Vier Tore ("City of Four Gates").

Since 2011, Neubrandenburg has been the capital of the Mecklenburgische Seenplatte district. It is the third-largest city and one of the main urban centres of Mecklenburg-Vorpommern. The city is an economical node of northeastern Germany, featuring one of the highest national ranks in employment density and GDP per capita. The closest greater urban areas are the regiopolis of Rostock and the metropolises of Szczecin, Berlin and Hamburg. Since 1991, Neubrandenburg has hosted a University of Applied Sciences that offers international exchanges, guest programs and study programs.

== History ==
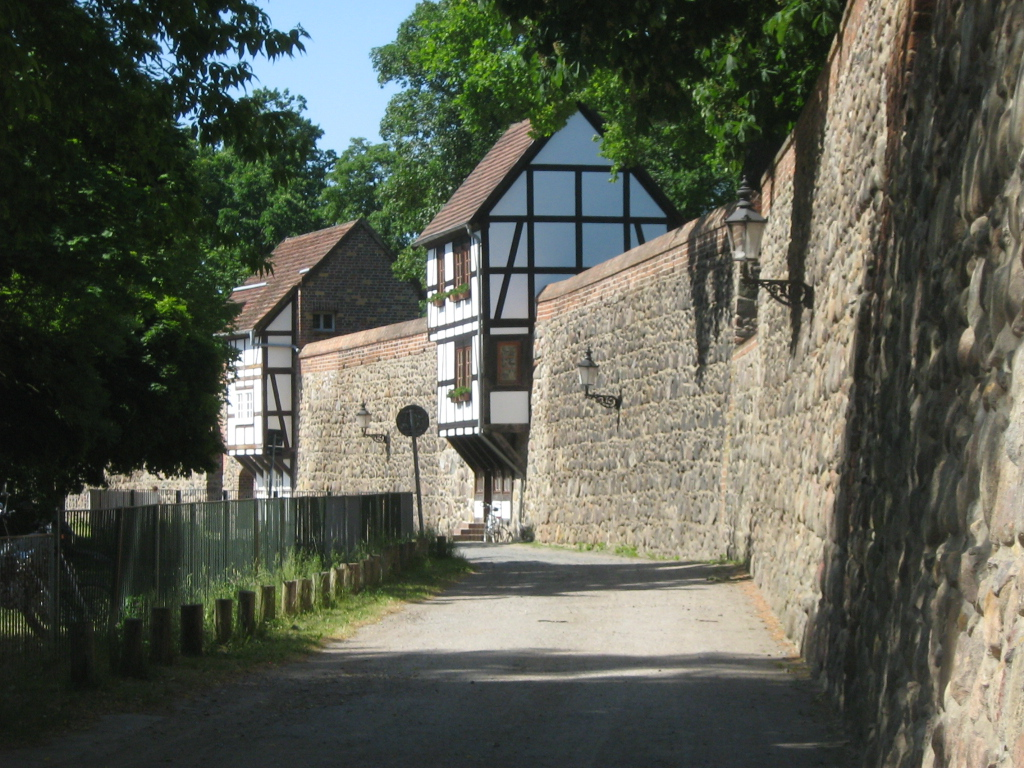
Two of the 25 (formerly 56) typical timbered Wiek houses along the Neubrandenburg city wall

The region had been left largely empty during the Migration Period and was re-settled by Slavs who then formed the Veleti, starting in the 7th century. Frankish and Saxon influence increased since the late 8th century but suffered several setbacks. After final subjugation by the Saxons in the mid-12th century, German colonisation greatly intensified after 1200. The first Christian monks in the area were Premonstratensians at Broda Abbey, a monastery by the lakeshore (about 1240). The foundation of the city known as of Neubrandenburg took place in 1248, when the Margrave of Brandenburg decided to build a settlement in the northern part of his fief, naming it after the older city of Brandenburg further south. In 1292, the city and the surrounding area became part of Mecklenburg.

The city flourished as a trade centre until the Thirty Years' War (1618–48), when this position was lost due to incessant warfare. During the dramatic advance of the Swedish army of Gustavus Adolphus into Germany, the city was garrisoned by Swedes, but it was retaken by Imperial Catholic League forces in 1631. During this campaign, it was widely reported that the Catholic forces killed many of the Swedish and Scottish soldiers while they were surrendering. Later, according to the Scottish soldier of fortune Robert Munro, 18th Baron of Foulis, when the Swedes themselves adopted a "no prisoners" policy, they would cut short any pleas for mercy with the cry of "New Brandenburg!". The city, therefore, played an unconscious role in the escalation of brutality of one of history's most brutal wars.

Neubrandenburg was one of two Vorderstädte (lit. 'primary cities') of the duchy of Mecklenburg, i.e. it represented the interests of the cities and towns at the regional assembly (the Landtag or diet). From 1701 to 1934, it formed a part of Mecklenburg-Strelitz, a small, primarily rural, and socio-economically backward state of northeastern Germany, being its largest or second-largest city (closely tied with Neustrelitz, the capital). From 1856 to 1863, Fritz Reuter, the most successful author of Low German literature and one of the best-sold German authors of the 19th century, lived here. In 1864, Neubrandenburg was connected to Berlin by railway, and developed some modest industry, mostly connected with the needs of the predominant agricultural sector of the region.

Under Nazism, an airbase was built at nearby Trollenhagen and a facility for torpedo trials was established in Lake Tollense. The city's rural situation far from any borders shielded it from air attacks for some time. During the Second World War, two German prisoner-of-war camps for Allied POWs of various nationalities were located in Fünfeichen within the city limits: the large Stalag II-A and the adjacent Oflag II-E/67 for officers. The same site was operated from 1945 to 1948 as special NKVD-camp Nr. 9. The town was also the location of a forced labour camp for Sinti and Romani people. In 1945, a few days before the end of the Second World War, 80% of the old town was burned down by the Red Army in a great fire that destroyed, inter alia, City Hall (incl. most of the Municipal Archives), the Grand Ducal Palace (incl. the Municipal Arts Collections) and St. Mary's Church. About 600 people committed suicide in fear of or as a result of the Soviet advance.

After the war, within the newly-founded Socialist GDR (East Germany), the city centre was slowly rebuilt in the 1950s and 60s in a simplified neoclassicist and neo-Renaissance style. Large numbers of refugees from Germany's former eastern territories and from Czechoslovakia were resettled in the city. Neubrandenburg was designated the centre of a Bezirk, the highest tier of administrative divisions in East Germany, in 1952. As such, the city was supposed to embody the vision of a "Socialist city" and was to be greatly expanded and industrialised. Population increased from about 20,000 at war's end to about 90,000 in the late 1980s. Large panel-type housing estates were built in several parts of the city (among them the first example of WBS 70 which became the most common type of panel housing in East Germany). The demolished market square area was reshaped by the Haus der Kultur und Bildung (House of Culture and Education), a Socialist-style civic centre, complemented by a 56 m highrise. Brigitte Reimann, a prominent GDR writer whose works deal with the attempt at building a Socialist society, spent her last years (1968-1973) in the city.

As in all of East Germany, the reunification of Germany in 1990 brought an improvement of political and social freedoms but also a deep socio-economic crisis with large-scale unemployment and emigration. The population sharply dropped, stabilising at about 65,000 people (2023), with some of those losses, however, just going to surrounding bedroom communities. The economic situation finally slowly improved, many historical buildings were renovated, e.g. St. Mary's Church that was refurbished as a concert hall. The University of Applied Sciences was founded in 1991, focusing on social work, health, agriculture and food industry. After 1990, Neubrandenburg lost its position as a Bezirk centre and remained an autonomous district-level city (Kreisfreie Stadt) within the state of Mecklenburg-Vorpommern. In 2011, it emerged as the capital of a huge new district Mecklenburgische Seenplatte, the largest in Germany, with an area slightly more than half that of its former Bezirk.

== Sights and monuments ==
Neubrandenburg has preserved its medieval city wall in its entirety. The wall, 7 m high with a perimeter of 2.3 km, has four Brick Gothic city gates, dating back to the 14th and 15th centuries. Of these, one of the most impressive is the Stargarder Tor (pictured), with its characteristic gable-like shape and the filigree tracery and rosettes on the outer defence side.

Another place of interest is the Brick Gothic Marienkirche (Church of the Virgin Mary or St. Mary's Church, Konzertkirche), completed 1298. The church was nearly destroyed in 1945, but it was restored in 1975 and now houses a concert hall (opened 2001).

The tallest highrise in the city is the 56 m tower of the Haus der Kultur und Bildung (HKB, House of Culture & Education), opened in 1965. Its slender appearance has earned it the nickname Kulturfinger ("culture finger").

Other attractions include Neubrandenburg Regional Museum.

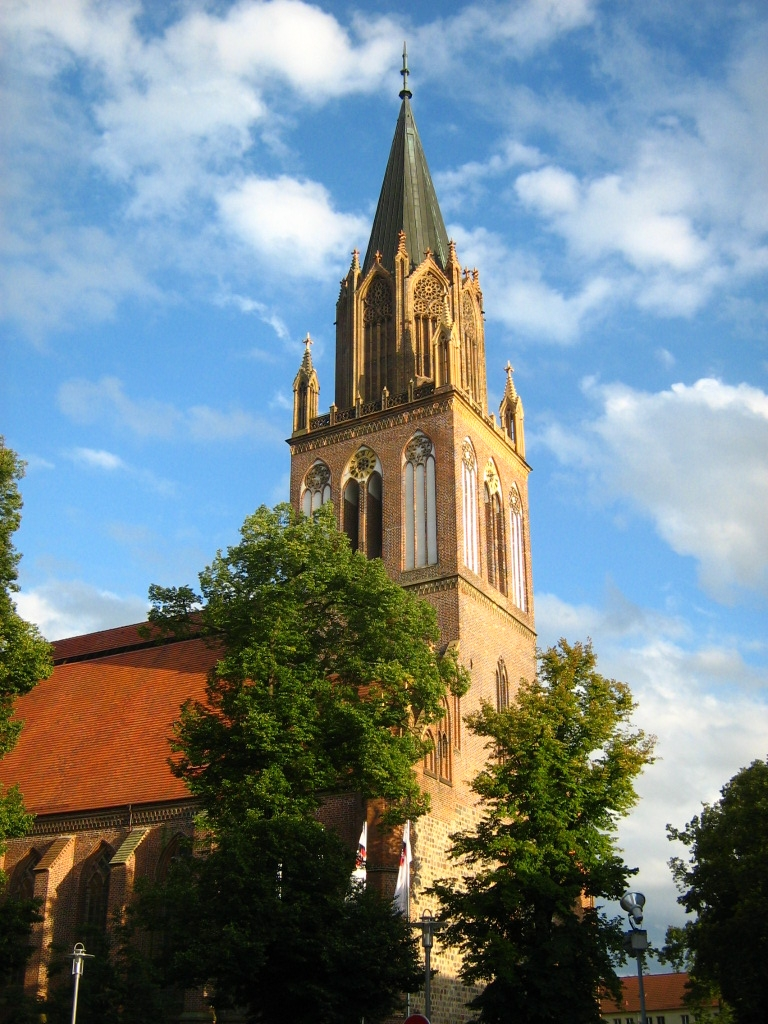
St. Mary's Church (used for concerts)

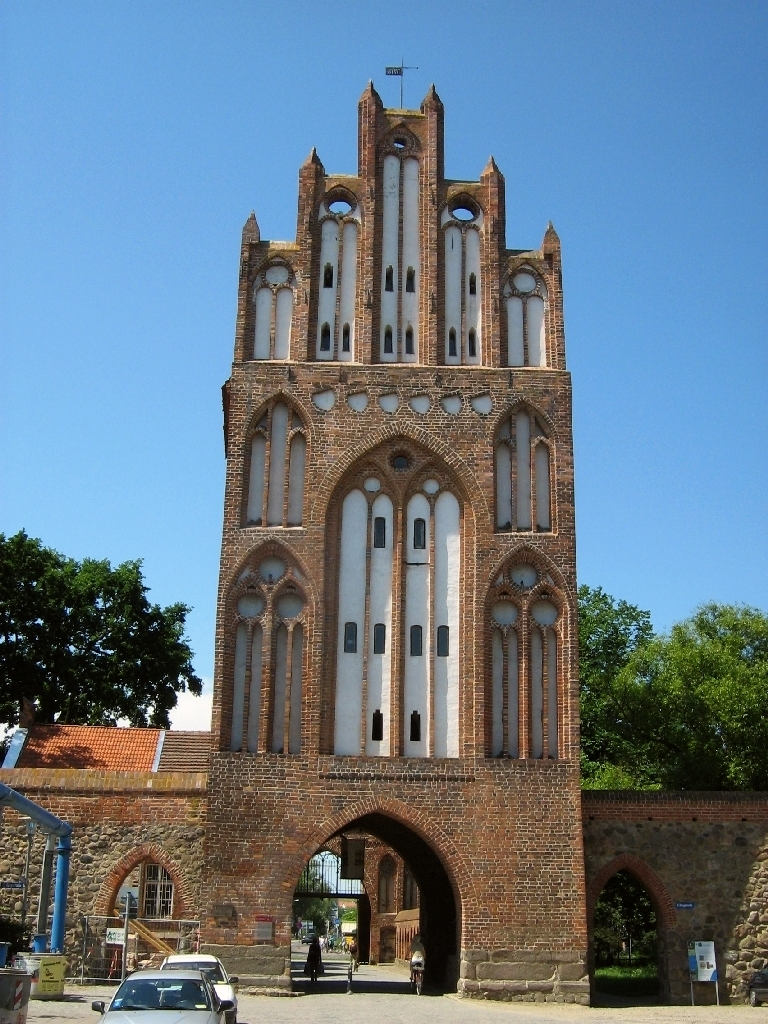
Treptow Gate with Neubrandenburg Regional Museum

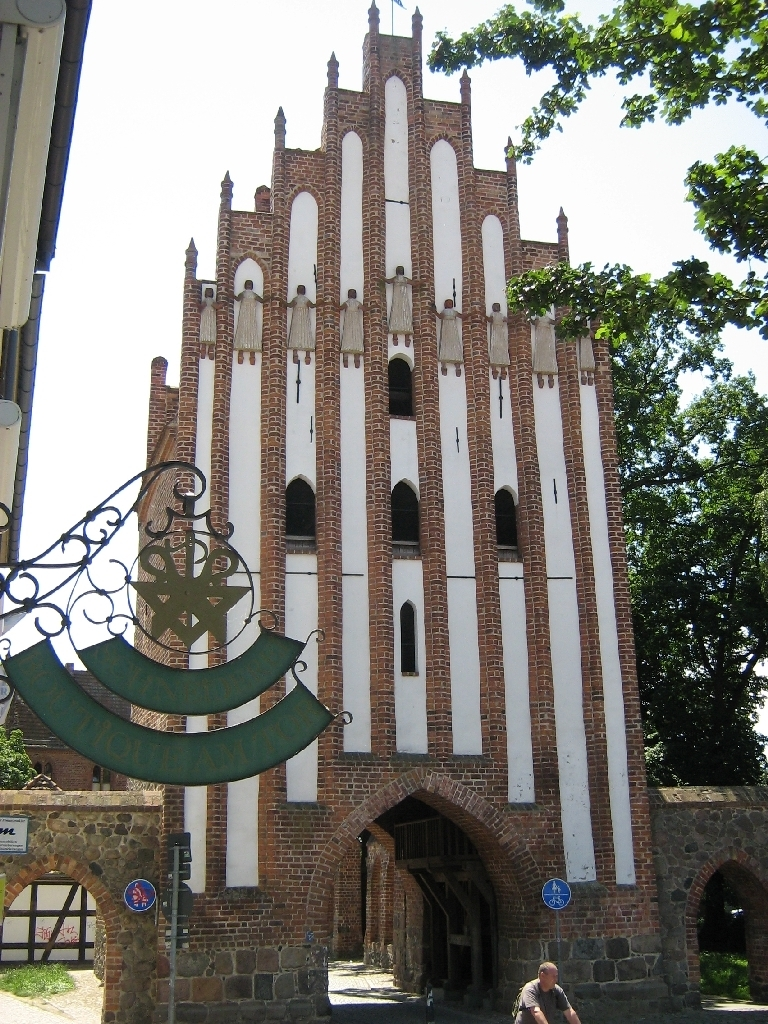
Stargard Gate

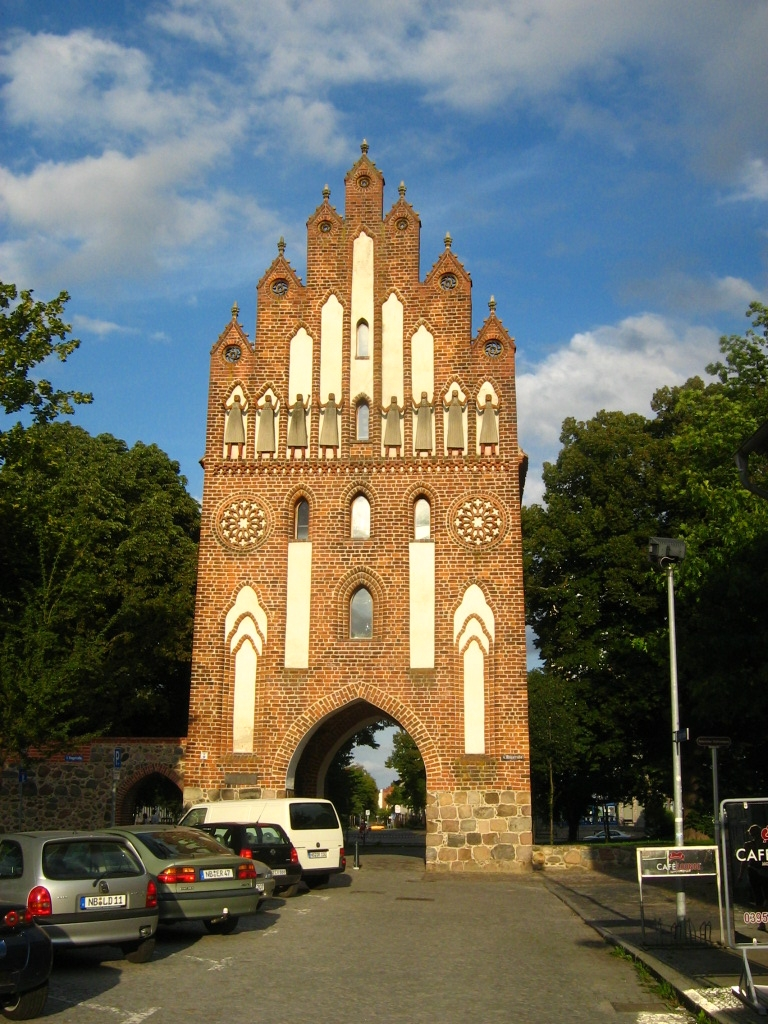
New Gate

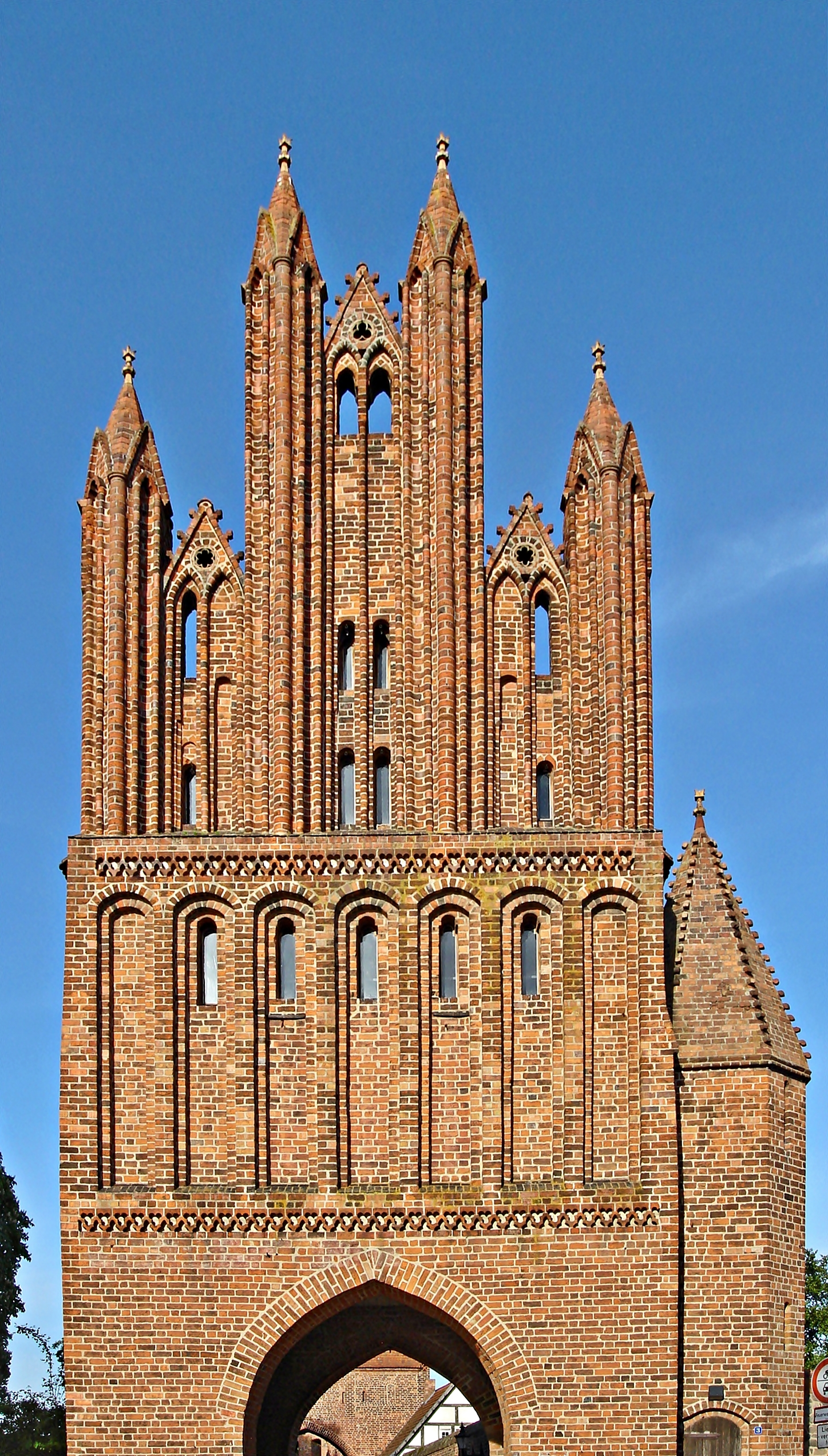
Friedland Gate

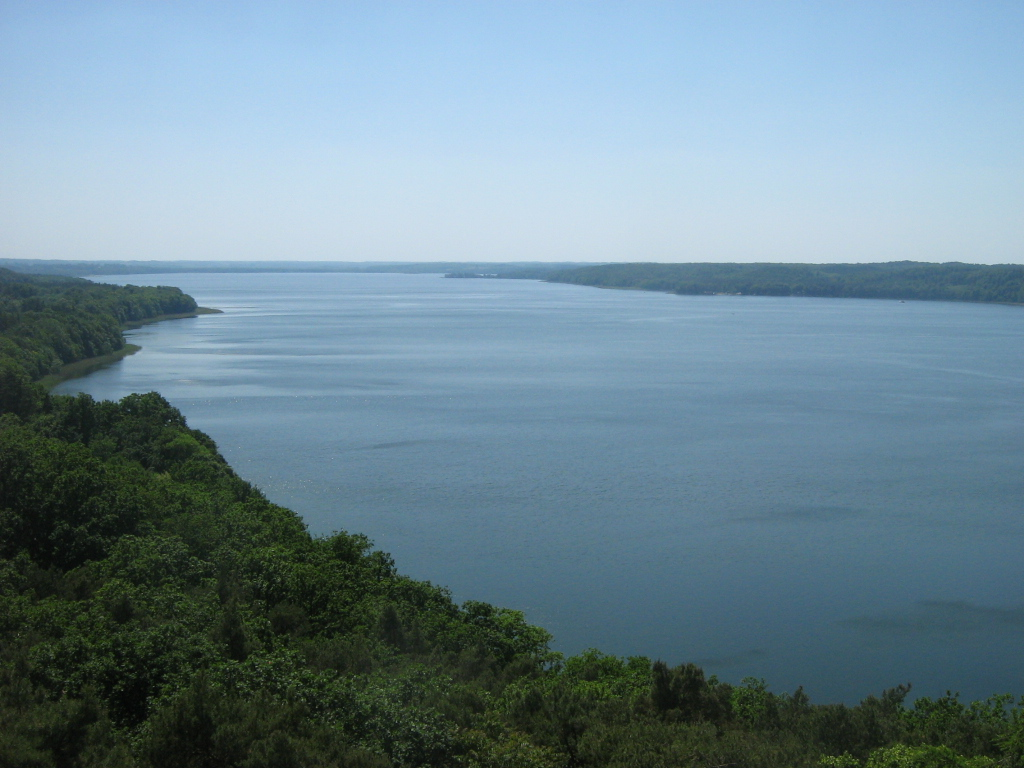
Tollensesee

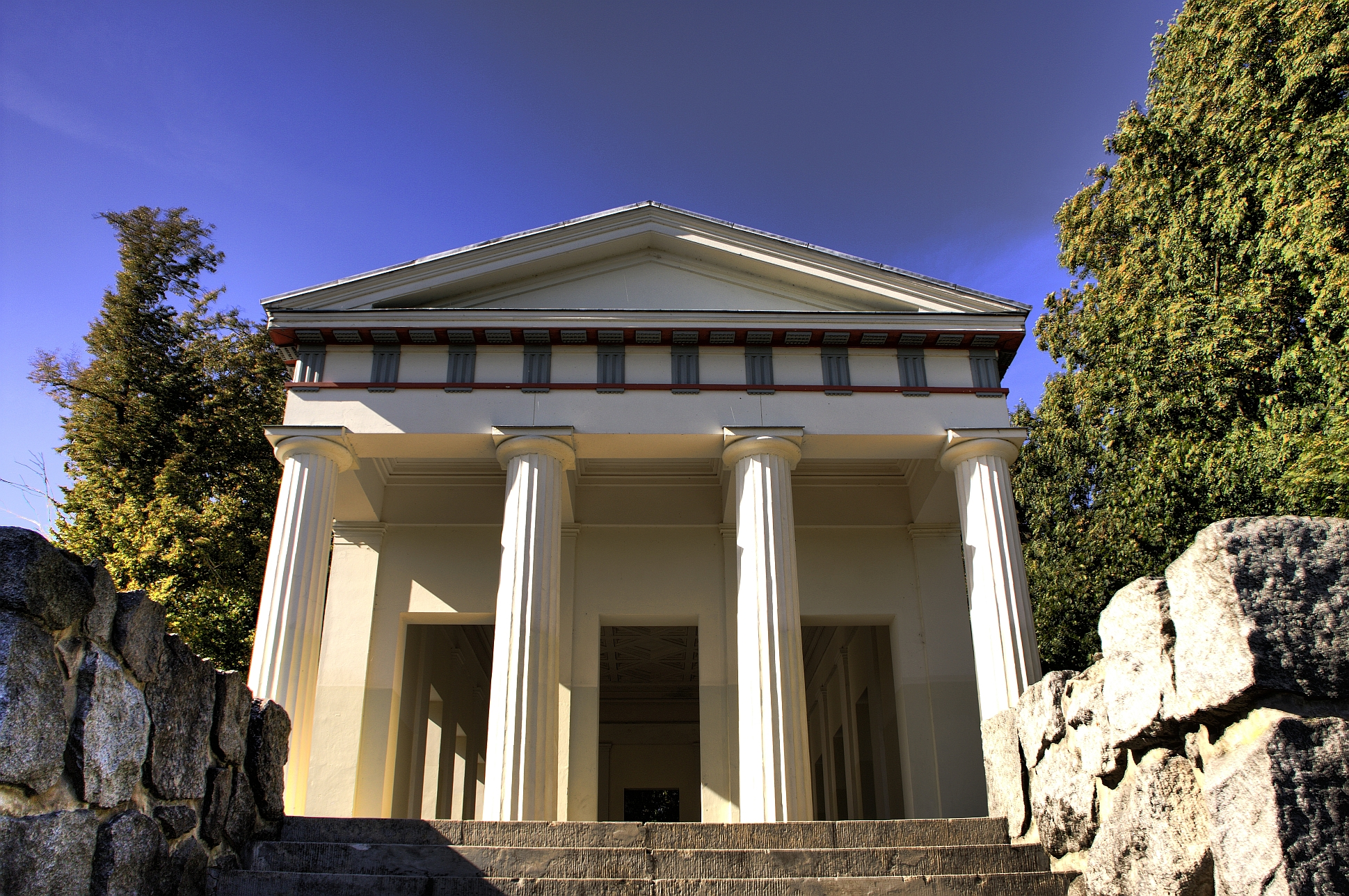
Belvedere

== Education ==
- Hochschule Neubrandenburg (University of Applied Sciences)
- Three large secondary schools

== Sports ==
Neubrandenburg is known as city of sports (Sportstadt). The city is famous for being home to various Olympic medal winners and talents in sports, especially in canoeing (Andreas Dittmer, Martin Hollstein), discus throwing and shotputting (Astrid Kumbernuss, Ralf Bartels, Franka Dietzsch) and running (Katrin Krabbe). Neubrandenburg was the location of both of the world record throws in Discus, by Jürgen Schult in 1986 and by Gabriele Reinsch in 1988. The Jahnstadion, the Jahnsportforum stadium, the Stadthalle and adjacent sport parks offer vast options for large sport and culture events. The city is also home to a dedicated sports elite school, the Sportgymnasium Neubrandenburg.

The Günter Harder Stadion was a multi purpose stadium that existed from 1949 to circa 1996. It hosted football and motorcycle speedway and held qualifying rounds of the Speedway World Championship in 1964 and 1965.

== Notable people ==
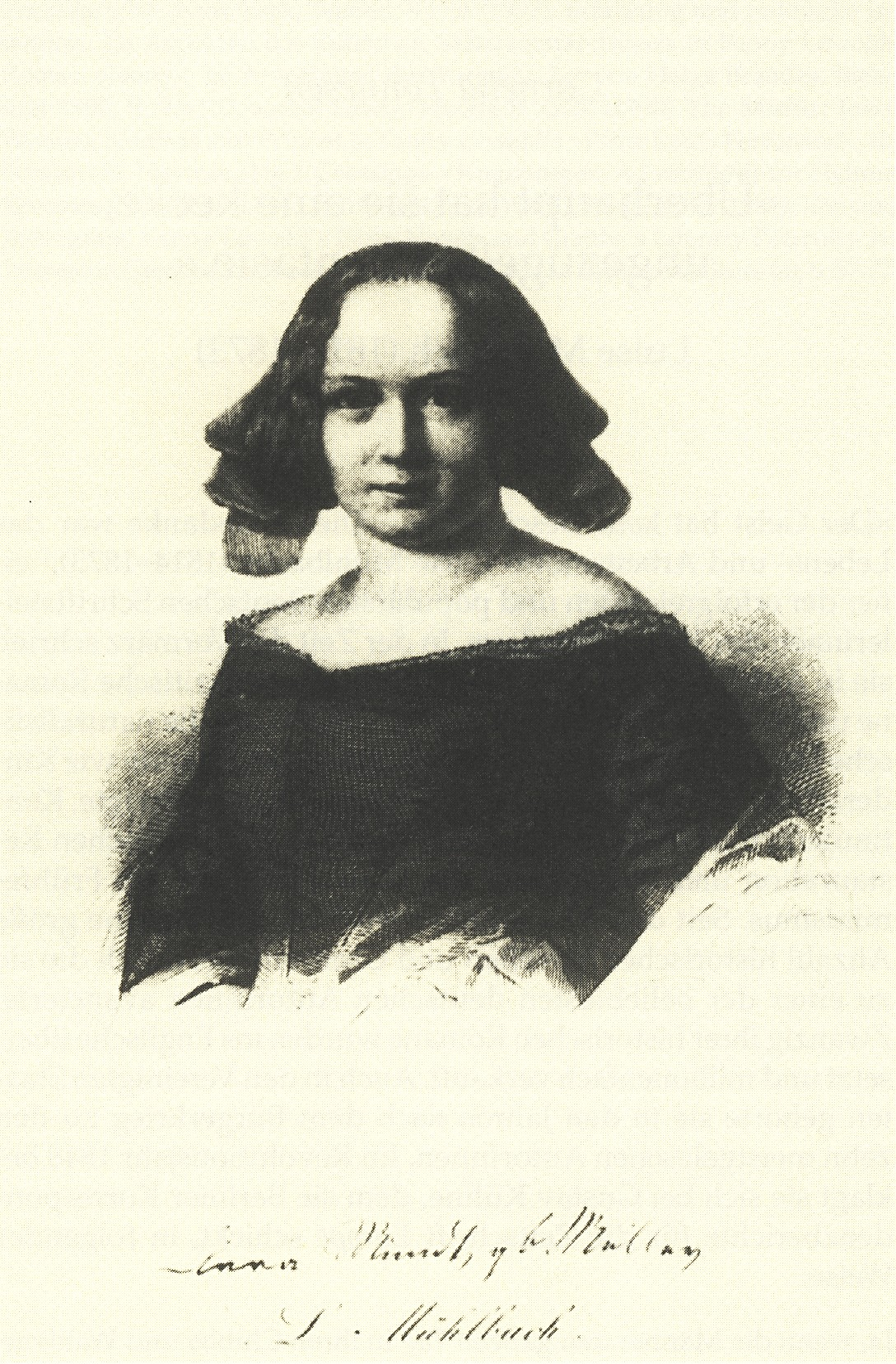
Luise Mühlbach, c. 1850

- Wenceslaus Johann Gustav Karsten (1732–1787), German mathematician; did complex logarithms.
- Fritz Reuter (1810-1874), most successful writer in the Low German language, spent important parts of his middle age here.
- Luise Mühlbach (1814-1873), German writer of historical fiction.
- Theodor Leipart (1867–1947), German trades unionist.
- Theodor Estermann (1902–1991), American mathematician, worked on analytic number theory.
- Otto Remer (1912-1997), Nazi German military officer who helped put down the 20th July plot, post-war far-right activist.
- Brigitte Reimann (1933-1973), East German writer closely tied to Socialist Ankunftsliteratur, spent her last years here.
- Jürnjakob Timm (born 1949), German cellist; played for over 40 years in the Leipzig Gewandhaus Orchestra
- Annegret Rosenmüller (born 1967), German musicologist.

=== Sport ===
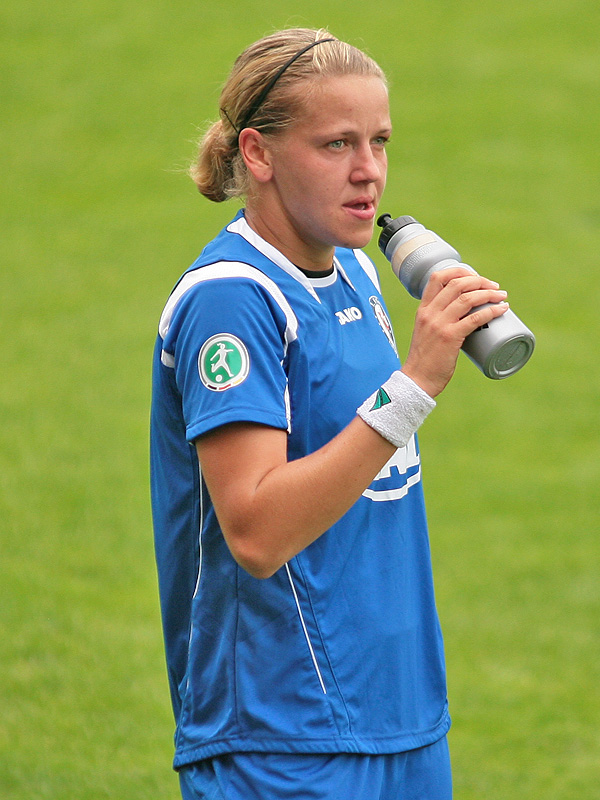
Viola Odebrecht, 2008

- Hans-Jürgen Wallbrecht (1943–1970), German rower; team silver medallist at the 1964 Summer Olympics
- Rüdiger Helm (born 1956), East German sprint canoeist; multiple team gold and bronze Olympic medallist
- Ulf Hielscher (born 1967), German bobsledder; team bronze medallist at the 1994 Winter Olympics
- Jana Sorgers (born 1967), German rower, team gold medallist at the 1988 Summer Olympics
- Tim Borowski (born 1980), football manager and former player; played 294 games and 33 for Germany
- Sebastian Zbik (born 1982), German boxer; former WBC middleweight World Champion
- Viola Odebrecht (born 1983), former footballer, played over 120 games and 49 for Germany women
- Martin Hollstein (born 1987), German sprint canoer; gold and bronze Olympic medallist
- Matthes Langhoff (born 2002), German handball player
- Katrin Krabbe (born 1960) East German sprinter; world champion 100m and 200m at the 1991 World Championships in Athletics

== Governance ==
The current mayor of Neubrandenburg is independent politician Silvio Witt since 2015. The most recent mayoral election was held on 16 January 2022, and the results were as follows:

Candidate	Party	Votes	%
Silvio Witt	Independent (CDU/SPD/FDP)	16,325	87.5
Gunar Mühle	The Left	2,327	12.5
Valid votes		18,652	99.5
Invalid votes		93	0.5
Total		38,745	100.0
Electorate/voter turnout		52,941	35.4
Source: City of Neubrandenburg

The most recent city council election was held on 9 June 2024, and the results were as follows:

Party	Votes	%	±	Seats	±
Alternative for Germany (AfD)	17,473	21.5	▲5.4	9	▲2
Christian Democratic Union (CDU)	14,597	17.9	▼7.4	8	▼3
Sahra Wagenknecht Alliance (BSW)	13,037	16.0	New	7	New
Social Democratic Party (SPD)	9,238	11.4	▼5.1	5	▼2
Project Neubrandenburg (Projekt-NB)	7,218	8.9	New	4	New
The Left (Die Linke)	6,411	7.9	▼15.9	3	▼7
Citizens for Neubrandenburg (BfN)	5,195	6.4	New	3	New
Alliance 90/The Greens (Grüne)	4,131	5.1	▼6.2	2	▼3
Strong Citizens Neubrandenburg (SBNB)	1,866	2.3	New	1	New
Free Democratic Party (FDP)	827	1.0	▼2.4	0	▼2
Independent Sandmann	695	0.9	New	0	New
dieBasis	485	0.6	New	0	New
The Homeland (HEIMAT)	245	0.3	New	0	New
Valid votes	81,408	100.0			
Invalid ballots	1,001	1.2			
Total ballots	28,124	100.0		43	±0
Electorate/voter turnout	51,927	54.2	▲2.2		
Source: City of Neubrandenburg

In October 2024 Mr. Witt announced on Facebook that he would step down as Lord Mayor effective May 2025.

== Twin towns – sister cities ==
Neubrandenburg is twinned with:

- Collegno, Italy (1965)
- Flensburg, Germany (1987)
- Gladsaxe, Denmark (1990)
- Koszalin, Poland (1974)
- Nazareth, Israel (1998)
- Nevers, France (1973)
- Petrozavodsk, Russia (1983)
- Villejuif, France (1966)
- Yangzhou, China (1999)
