= Lahti Ski Museum =

Museum in Lahti, Finland

- Hiihtomuseo
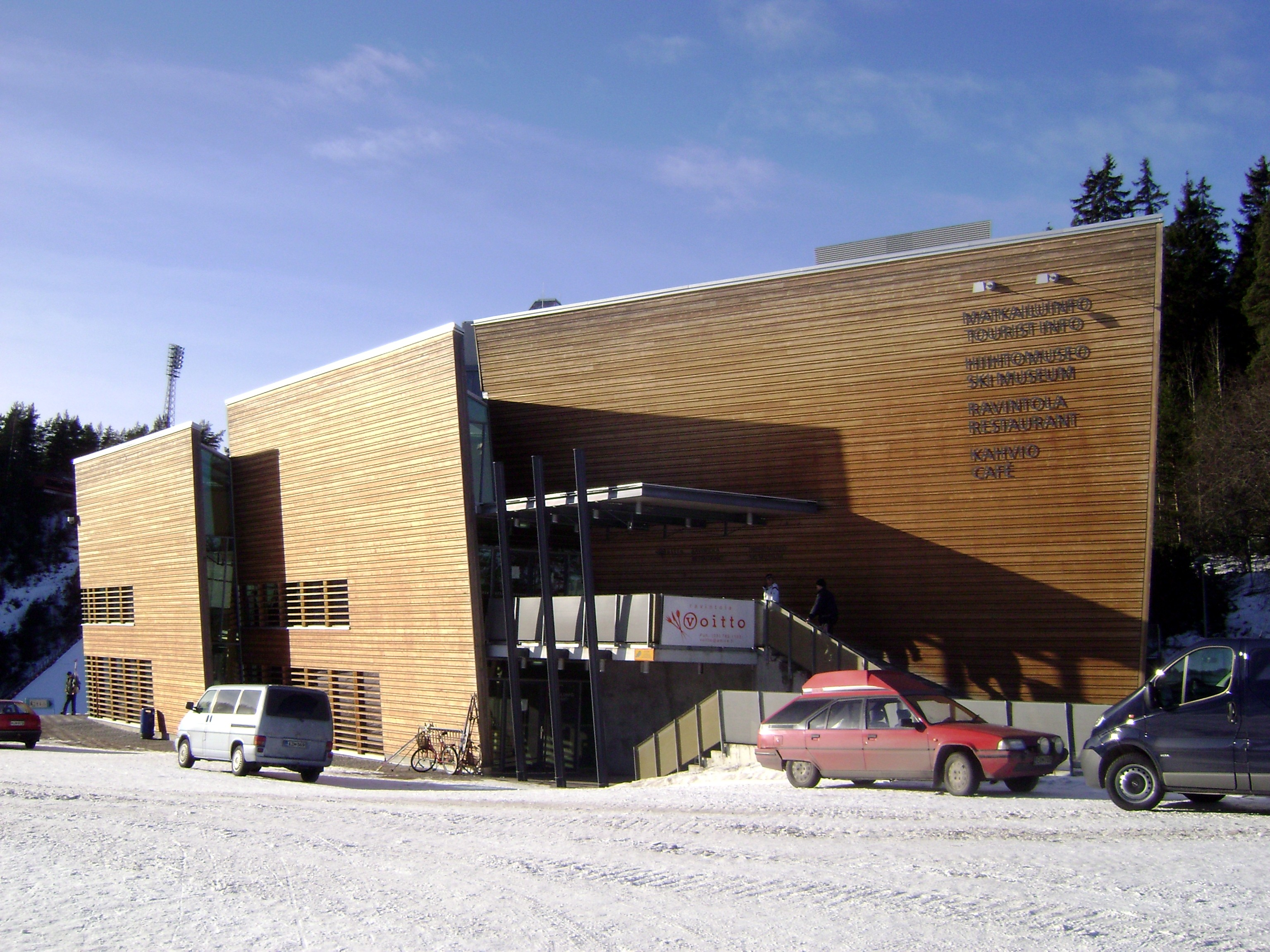
- Lahti Ski Museum in 2008
- Established: 1959
- Location: Lahti, Finland
- Coordinates: 60.984075°N 25.632993°E
- Visitors: 21,000 (2019)
- Architects: Esko Hämäläinen (original); Pekka Salminen (current)
- Owner: City of Lahti

Lahti Ski Museum is a sports museum located in Lahti, Finland, specialising in skiing and other winter sports. It is situated in the city's main sports complex adjacent to the Salpausselkä ski-jumping venue.

== History ==
The museum traces its roots back to 1959, when the first exhibits were put on by the local winter sports club, Lahden Hiihtoseura (literally, 'Lahti skiing society'). The City of Lahti took over the activity in 1974, and the museum has formed part of the Lahti municipal museum since.

The first purpose-built facility opened in 1989, designed by architect Esko Hämäläinen. The exterior of the building was redesigned in 2000 (shown in the picture) by Pekka Salminen, and the entire building underwent a renovation in 2017.

== Exhibits ==
As of 2020, the permanent core exhibition, titled 'Sense of Skiing' (Hiihdon henkeä), charts the history of skiing and ski equipment, as well as of the annual Lahti Ski Games which have taken place since 1923.

Additional exhibitions focus on themes such as the history of women's competitive skiing, the evolution of ski design, ski-jumping, etc.

Among the exhibits, the medals of the Finnish ski-jumping legend Matti Nykänen are on display at the museum.

There are also interactive displays, where visitors can try their hand at biathlon shooting with an infrared rifle, or experience ski-jumping with the help of a simulator.

== Visitors ==
In 2018, Lahti Ski Museum was visited by 15,800 museum-goers. In 2019, this increased to over 21,000, according to the published figures by City of Lahti.

Lahti Ski Museum participates in the nationwide 'Museum Card' (Museokortti) initiative of the Finnish Museums Association, which for an annual fee allows unlimited entry to over 300 venues across Finland.

Visitors under the age of 18 can visit the Lahti city museums, including the Ski Museum, free of charge.

- Holmenkollen Ski Museum
