= Helsinki City Theatre =

Theatre in Helsinki, Finland

- Helsingin kaupunginteatteri
- The theatre, as viewed from the southeast
- Interactive map of Helsinki City Theatre
- Address: Eläintarhantie 3 Helsinki; Finland
- Coordinates: 60°10′55″N 24°56′33″E
- Owner: Helsinki Theatre Foundation
- Capacity: 2625 across 6 stages: 947 (big stage) 500 (Arena stage) 347 (small stage) 324 (studio Pasila) 267 (Lilla Teatern) 240 (studio Elsa)
- Type: Theatre

Construction
- Opened: September 1967
- Expanded: 1989, 2001, 2005, 2010
- Architect: Timo Penttilä

Website
- hkt.fi

The Helsinki City Theatre (Finnish: Helsingin kaupunginteatteri; Swedish: Helsingfors stadsteater) is a theatre located in Helsinki, Finland. Owned by the Helsinki Theatre Foundation, it calls itself a "modern popular bilingual repertoire theatre."

The Helsinki City Theatre is the only Finnish representative in the European Theatre Convention. In addition to drama and musicals, the theatre operates a concert dance oriented branch, the Helsinki Dance Company.

Annual figures reported by the theatre include 20 new productions, 1,100 performances, and 350,000 spectators. The theatre has 250 permanent members of staff, and operates across 6 stages.

== History ==
The theatre has its roots in two organizations: Helsingin Työväenteatteri ("Workers' Theatre of Helsinki", established in 1902) and Helsingin Kansanteatteri (People's Theatre of Helsinki, established in 1934). These two merged in 1948 to form Helsingin Kansanteatteri-Työväenteatteri ("People's and Workers' Theatre of Helsinki"), which eventually transitioned into the Helsinki City Theatre in 1964. The rebranding was largely a result of the emergence of the Helsinki Theatre Foundation, who owns the theatre, and whose members are elected by the City Council of Helsinki.

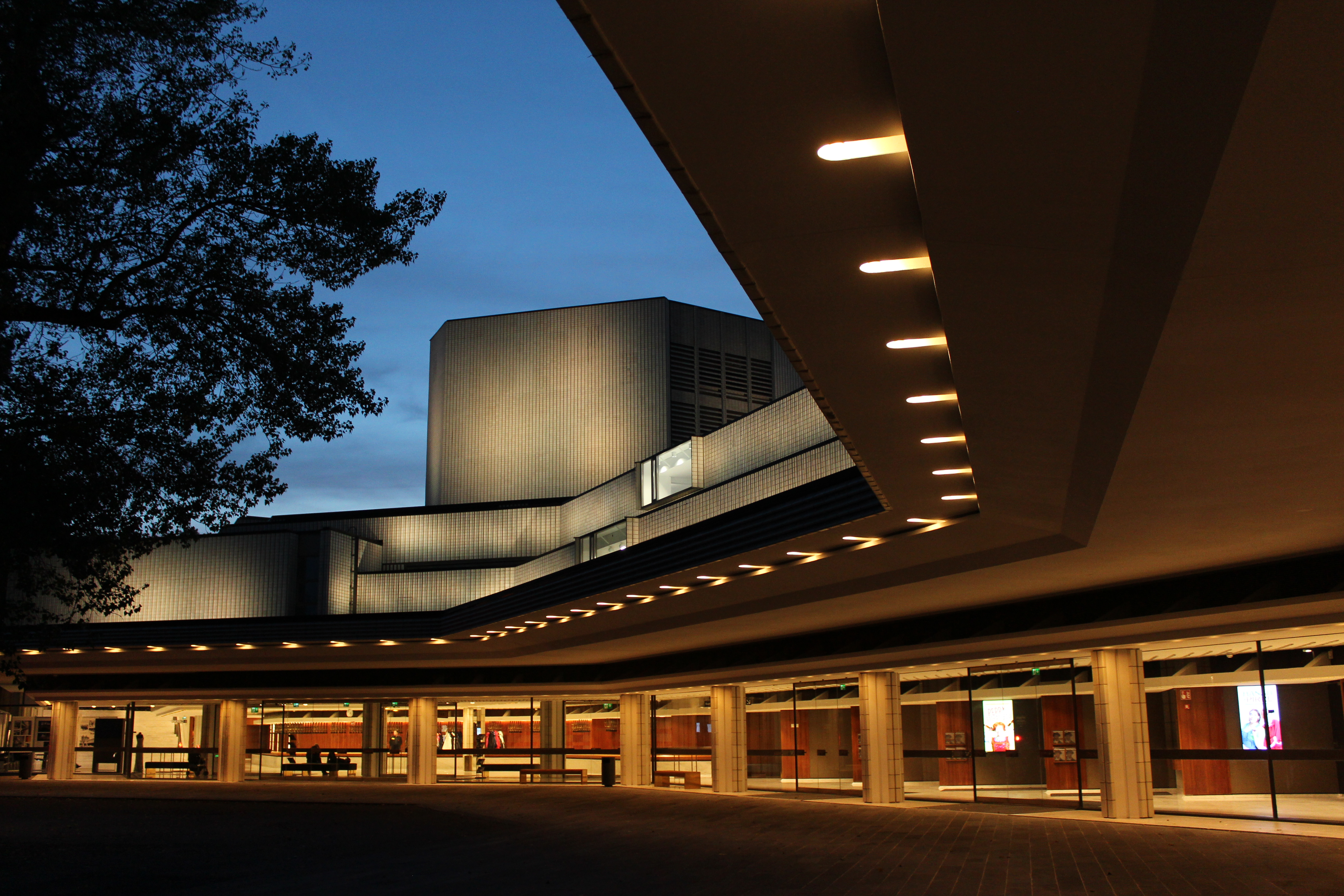
Theatre at nightfall (September 2017)

Prior to 1965, the Helsinki City Theatre operated on third-party stages, after which the organization chose to construct a theatre building of their own. They held an architectural competition for the design of the new building, which was won by architects Timo Penttilä and Kari Virta. The building designed by Penttilä opened in 1967. In 1989, an annex building was constructed, which was also designed by Penttilä's architectural firm. The working drawings for the theatre building were later donated to the Museum of Finnish Architecture. A bronze model of the theatre building is on display in the theatre vestibule.

== Stages ==
- Big stage (Finnish: Suuri näyttämö) — 947 seats
- Arena stage — 500 seats
- Small stage (Finnish: Pieni näyttämö)— 347 seats
- Studio Pasila — 324 seats
- Lilla Teatern — 267 seats
- Studio Elsa — 240 seats

== See also ==
- Alexander Theatre
- Club act!one (2003)
- Finnish National Theatre
- Swedish Theatre
