= Lahti Ski Games =

Annual Nordic skiing tournament in Lahti, Finland

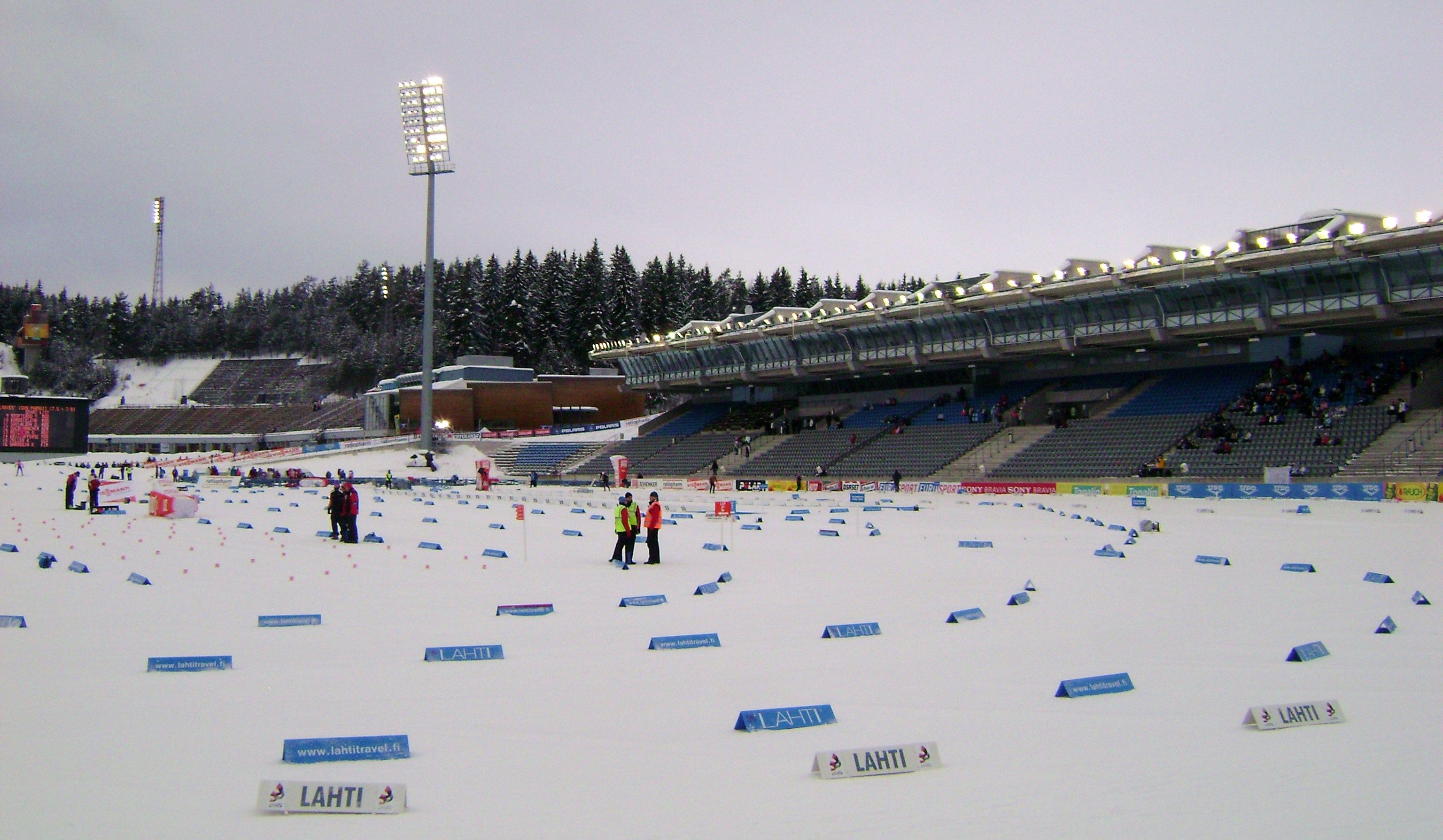

Lahti Ski Games
- Organizers: Lahti Ski Club, Lahti city and Finnish Ski Association (since 1950)
- Location: Lahti
- Country: Finland
- First Games: 1923
- Games cancelled: 1930, 1940 and 1942
- World Championships: 1926, 1938, 1958, 1978, 1989, 2001 and 2017
- Attendance record: 450,000

Lahti Ski Games is an annual international Nordic skiing tournament held in Lahti, Finland. The games last for three days, during which participants compete in cross-country skiing, ski jumping, and Nordic combined.

The Lahti Ski Games were established with the goal of creating a Finnish winter sports competition comparable to the Holmenkollen Ski Festival. The venue integrates a cross-country skiing stadium and a ski jump stadium, offering spectators in the covered stands a view of the course layout as it descends into the stadium area toward the finish line. At maximum capacity, the stadium can accommodate close to 100,000 spectators.

The idea for the games came from a Finnish legend, Lauri Pihkala in 1922. He wrote an article about a competition equal to the Holmenkollen Ski Festival after the double win of Anton Collin and Tapani Niku at Holmenkollen the same year. In the article Pihkala suggested Lahti as the location for the competition because of the city’s location and grounds.

== First competition ever held ==
The first Lahti Ski Games was held 3–4 February 1923. From the very beginning volunteers have played a big part in arranging the games. At the first Lahti Ski Games only Finnish competitors attended the event, but it was still a success. From then on the citizens were encouraged to flag during the competition weekend so that the city would look its best.

== History ==
Competitors from other countries took part in the games for the first time in 1926. The games were FIS congress competition, which attracted competitors from 15 different countries. The Sport center where the games are held was now improved. The local schools were turned into accommodation as the students were on holiday.

The games lived through a quieter time period between the late 1960s and the early 1970s. It was time to develop marketing for the event and as a result additions to the program of the games were made in order create more entertainment value.

When the new millennium was approaching it was becoming clear that the games were not as visible in the city profile as before. According to speculations one of the reasons might be that the popularity of televised sport events kept the fans at home. The Saturday night ski jumping competition as well as the fireworks seen on the same night, have nonetheless remained popular among the public.

== Salpausselkä station ==
For many years the public came to the games from far, often by skiing. The crowds were also transported by a special train that came directly into a station at the Sport center. The Salpausselkä station was built in 1938 and it later relocated in 1957. Nowadays the station is replaced merely by a halt, which no longer has regular train traffic. The tracks are still partially in place.

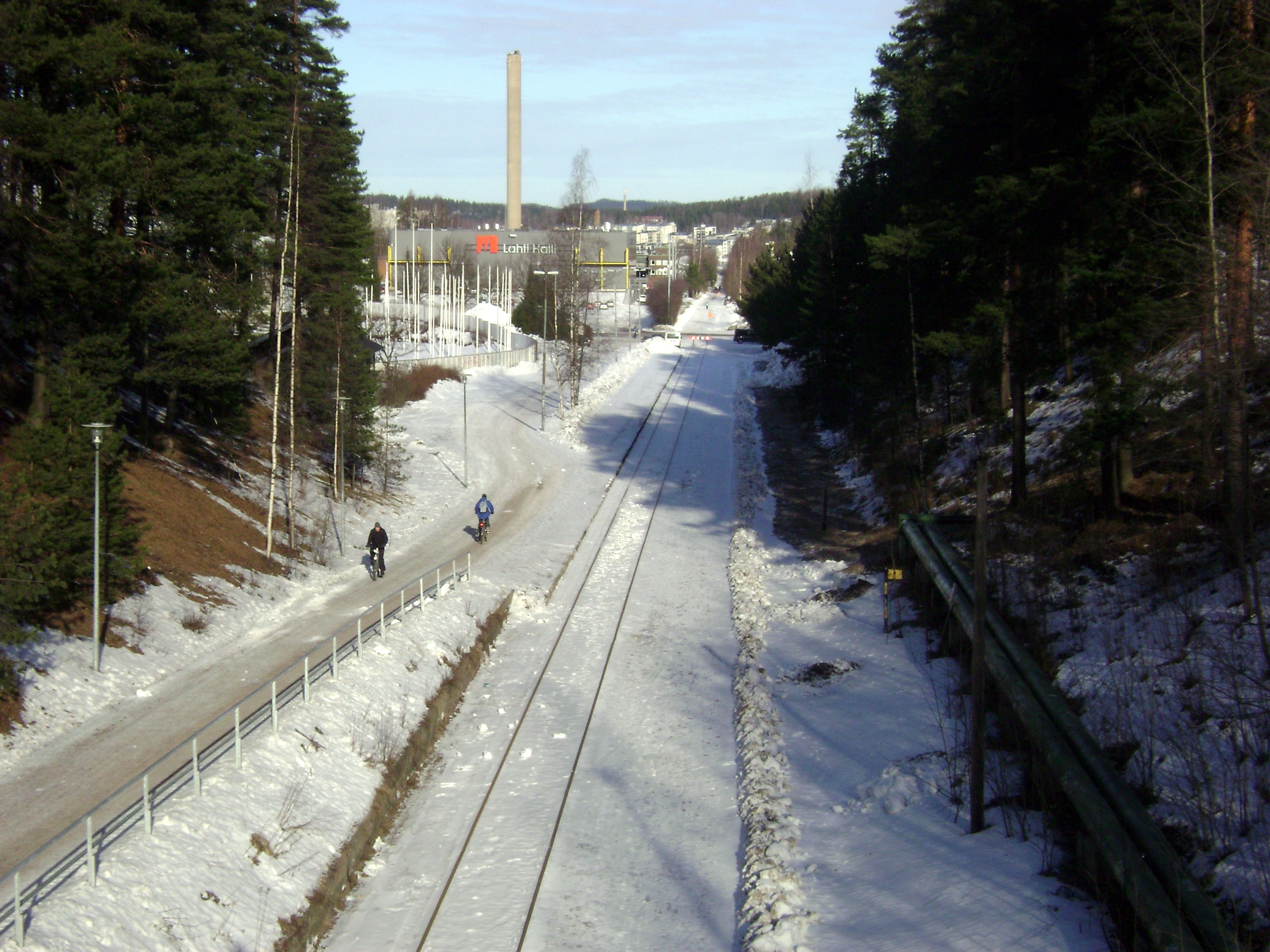
Salpausselän seisake

== Games cancellations ==
The games have only been cancelled three times: first in 1930 because of the lack of snow and in 1940 due to the Winter War. In 1942 there were no normal Lahti Ski Games held.

== Radio and television ==
The first time the Lahti Ski Games was ever broadcast was in 1932. It made the games national. In 1959 the games were televised live. However, it wasn’t until 1971 that the live televising was extended to cover footage also straight from the skiing tracks.

== Sport ==
Today participants compete in cross-country skiing, ski jumping and Nordic combined. The sports in which athletes compete at Lahti Ski Games have gone through many changes throughout the games’ history. In the early years participants competed in the original 50 kilometer skiing. It was arranged for the last time in 1986. There have also been men’s 30 and 10 km, as well as the women’s 5 km. The seniors and youngsters had their own tour. In the 1938 Championships slalom was added to the competition. In 1970 the evening’s ski-jumping competition became the official team competition. In 2000 sprint was introduced. Results of the 2013 games: Germany 4-0-0, Norway 1-6-4, Poland 1-0-1, Sweden and USA 1-0-0, Japan 0-1-2, Kazakhstan 0-1-0, Slovakia 0-0-1.

== Sport center ==
Many changes have taken place at the Sport center over the years. Jumps over 50 meters became possible when the hill was raised in 1931. Several years later a new hill was constructed. It was raised again for the 25th anniversary Lahti Ski Games in 1947. Lahti city constructed the current hill during 1971–1972, and it was improved again later in 1998.

In the same complex operates the Lahti Ski Museum, part of the Lahti municipal museum system.

== Lahti folk celebration ==
The fireworks have gained a lot of popularity since the first time they were seen in 1934. Before the people got to see the fireworks a torch parade went through the city from the city hall all the way to the pit of the hill, i.e. the out-run at the Sport center. A million Finnish marks were charged for the 15 minutes long fireworks show. During 1942–1945 the fireworks were not organized.

During the long history of the games, the event has been a family occasion to which out-of-town family and friends were invited. In the early years accommodation was hard to come by and as a result schools were turned into lodging, while the local students were given a holiday.

From the very beginning the games also had different entertainment programs. Dances were held at town. They ended in the 1980s, but restaurants and nightclubs still draw the public in for a nice nightlife experience after the games.

At the sporting site public has had the opportunity to purchase little snacks and food. Often on the menu have been products like sausages, pea soup and broth, bun and coffee. They were required in large quantities to feed the hungry audience.

The event has been visited by important regional figures, including Finnish presidents Kyösti Kallio and Urho Kekkonen, the crown prince Harald of Norway and Icelandic president Kr. Eldjorn.

== See also ==
- Lahti Ski Museum
- Holmenkollen Ski Festival
- Swedish Ski Games
