= Timo Penttilä =

Finnish architect (1931–2011)

Timo Jussi Penttilä
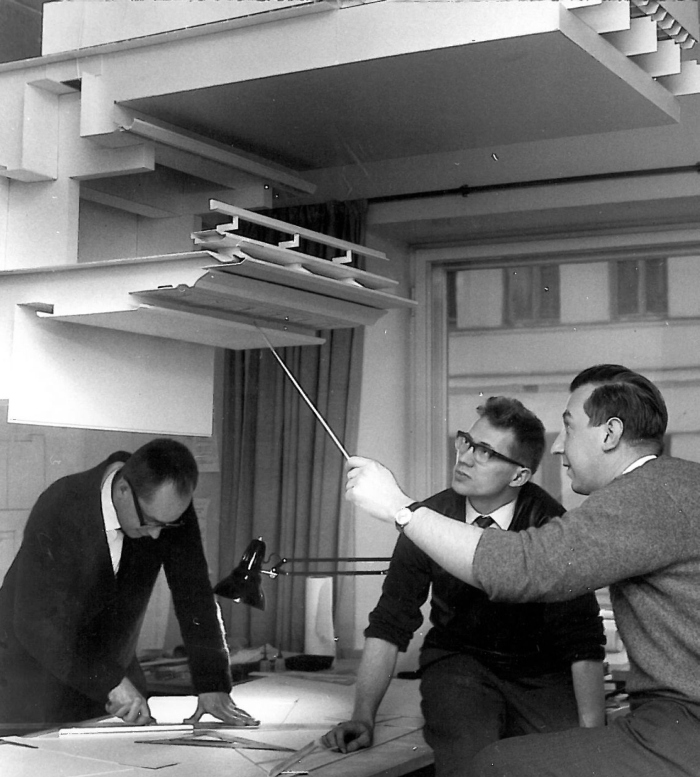
- Planning Helsinki City Theatre in 1964: from the left, Jukka Siivola, Pekka Salminen and Timo Penttilä
- Born: 16 March 1931; Tampere, Finland
- Died: 25 February 2011 (aged 79); Helsinki, Finland
- Occupation: Architect
- Practice: Arkkitehtitoimisto Timo Penttilä
- Buildings: Helsinki City Theatre; Sampola House, Tampere; Hanasaari power station, Helsinki

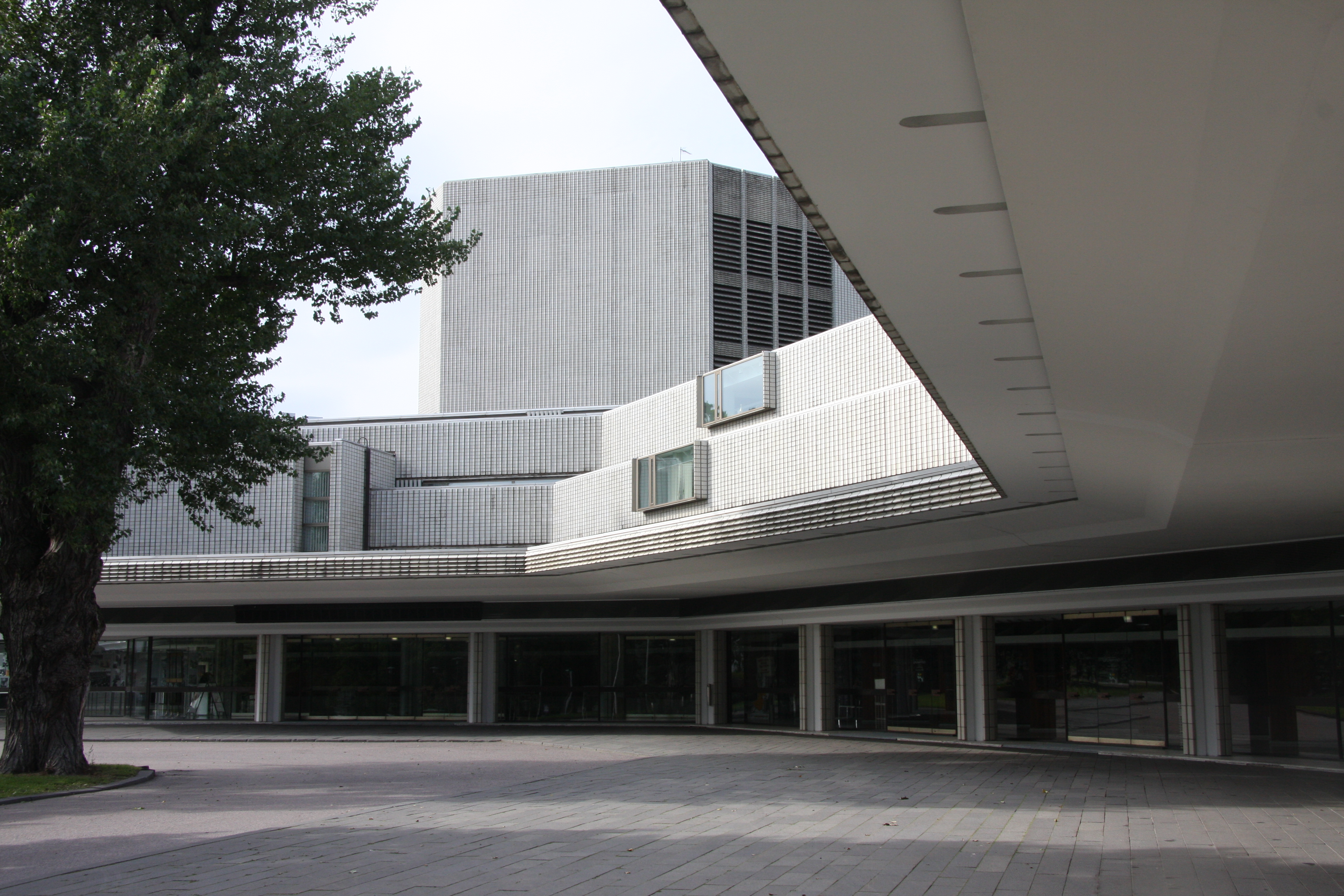
Helsinki City Theatre, 1967

Timo Jussi Penttilä (16 March 1931 – 25 February 2011) was a Finnish modernist architect and architecture theorist. He is best known for designing the Helsinki City Theatre, completed in 1967, and for major industrial and public buildings including the Ratina Stadium in Tampere and the Hanasaari B and Salmisaari power stations in Helsinki. He was professor of architecture at the Academy of Fine Arts Vienna from 1980 to 1996 and served as director of the Museum of Finnish Architecture from 1976 to 1980.

== Early life and education ==
Timo Jussi Penttilä was born 16 March 1931 in Tampere to Arvo Mikko Penttilä and Ester Elviira Matinheimo. His father was agronomist and acted as a supervisor improving cattle in the country. Penttilä graduated from Tampere secondary school in 1950 and went on to study architecture at Helsinki University of Technology, graduating in 1956.

== Career ==
In 1957–1959 he worked for architect Aarne Ervi before founding his own office. His breakthrough work was Sampola House, the Tampere Adult Education Centre, which Penttilä designed together with Kari Virta in 1958 and which was completed in 1960.

=== Helsinki City Theatre ===
The Helsinki city government held an open architecture competition for the design of a new city theatre in 1960–61, receiving 26 entries. First prize was awarded to the entry "Arlecchino," submitted by Penttilä and Kari Virta with assistance from architect Pekka Ilveskoski; the competition jury praised the proposal's functionality along with its architectural, urban and landscape qualities, describing it as "an original and beautiful proposal, in which the building adapts admirably to its surroundings." Construction was approved in 1965, and the completed building was handed over to the Helsinki Theatre Foundation on 7 September 1967, formally inaugurated on 7 October 1967, though performances at the smaller stage had already begun that August.

The theatre's design placed its main staging spaces on a single level and sited the building on its plot to preserve as much as possible of the mature tree cover of the adjoining Eläintarha park. Public spaces run along the building's south side in a long ribbon, giving unobstructed views into the park from the foyers of the main stage. The overall massing is closed and introverted, stepping down the site's terrain in terrace-like fashion; the façades are faced in moulded clinker brick from the Arabia factories, and cantilevered concrete elements emphasise the building's horizontality. Against this generally horizontal, landscape-adapted form, the faceted polygon of the stage tower stands out as an urban landmark. The building has been read by critics as continuing the humane, landscape-responsive strand of Finnish Modernism associated with Alvar Aalto, and has at times been mistaken for an Aalto design.

Penttilä's practice continued to work on the theatre long after its completion: in autumn 1989 a further extension, the Studio Elsa building (named after the actress Elsa Turakainen), was completed to the design of Arkkitehdit Oy Timo Penttilä–Kari Lind–Sakari Tilanterä, adding an expanded scene workshop, office space, a rehearsal and performance space, and a new ticket office. Penttilä wrote about the building himself in two articles in the Finnish architecture journal Arkkitehti in 1967, one describing the completed theatre and the other setting out his thinking on theatre design more generally. The young architect Pekka Salminen, who later became a professor of architecture in his own right, worked on the theatre design under Penttilä.

=== Other work ===
Among Penttilä's other building designs the best known are the Ratina Stadium in Tampere, completed in 1966 to a 1965 design, the Hanasaari B power station in Helsinki, completed in 1974, and the Salmisaari power station in Helsinki, designed with Kari Lind and Heikki Saarela and completed in 1985. At Hanasaari, Penttilä sought to lighten the visual mass of a very large power plant by concentrating its heaviest functions at the centre of the site and grouping secondary facilities, such as offices, coal conveyors and service buildings, into smaller units around the main generator building. During his career, Penttilä was criticized within the Finnish architectural profession for following uncompromisingly the modernist desire for experimentation and for defending the autonomy of architecture. Reflecting on his career in later years, Penttilä observed that architectural historians had tended to sort his contemporaries into "right" and "wrong" architects according to prevailing ideas of what belonged to the spirit of the 1960s, and that he had remained, by his own account, one of the "wrong" ones.

Penttilä was director of the Museum of Finnish Architecture in 1976–1980, and was a frequent contributor to the Finnish Architecture Review (Arkkitehti) from the late 1960s to the early 1980s, writing a number of polemical articles about architecture and the profession. An exhibition of his works was held at the Royal Institute of British Architects in London in 1980.

During the 1970s, Penttilä participated in a number of architectural competitions for the design of cultural and public buildings in the Middle East, including Bahrain's cultural centre (1976), the Iranian National Library in Tehran (1978), and the United Arab Emirates Ministry of Foreign Affairs (1979) – but none of which were built. In the later 1980s he courted controversy by designing a series of four 40-storey skyscrapers for the centre of his home town, Tampere. Local grass-roots opposition brought an end to the scheme which had been commissioned by the industrial company Tampella to redevelop an area where their factory then presently stood.

=== Vienna and later life ===
Penttilä was a visiting lecturer at the University of California, Berkeley in 1968–69. He was professor of architecture at the Academy of Fine Arts Vienna from 1980 to 1996, where he succeeded Roland Rainer; by his own account the invitation came unexpectedly, and he later described the move as one from the world of engineering into the camp of the humanists, immersing himself in history, philosophy, aesthetics and the human sciences over his sixteen years in the post. After his retirement he lived in Italy and Lapland (Finland). Following his death it emerged that he had written an extensive book on architecture theory. This was eventually published in 2013, by the Finnish publishers Gaudeamus, under the title "Oikeat ja väärät arkkitehdit – 2000 vuotta arkkitehtuuriteoriaa" (Right and wrong architects – 2000 years of architecture theory). Excerpts from his notes, written in English, have been published in Roger Connah's book "The School of Exile – Timo Penttilä for and against architecture theory" (2015).

Penttilä died 25 February 2011 in Helsinki.

== Selected works ==
- Sampola House, Tampere Adult Education Centre (with Kari Virta), Tampere, 1960
- Salokunta Church, Sastamala, 1960
- Tampere Business School, Tampere, 1965
- Ratina Stadium, Tampere, designed 1965, completed 1966
- Private row houses, Tammisalo, Helsinki, 1966
- Helsinki City Theatre (with Kari Virta), Helsinki, 1967
- Suomen kaupunkiopisto (Finnish city college), Espoo, 1975 (later partly demolished and converted into a hotel)
- Hanasaari B power station, Helsinki, 1974
- Hirviniemenranta luxury housing development, Helsinki, 1980 (later acquired for housing for the Republic of Korea)
- Suomen Sokeri (Finnish Sugar) headquarters, Tapiola, Espoo, 1980 (demolished 2014)
- Salmisaari power station (with Kari Lind and Heikki Saarela), Helsinki, 1985
- Perusyhtymä Oy, Makrotalo House, Tapiola, Espoo, 1986 (demolished 2018)
- Gumpendorferstraße apartment building, Vienna, 1988
- Studio Elsa extension, Helsinki City Theatre (with Kari Lind and Sakari Tilanterä), Helsinki, 1989

== Selection of works by Timo Penttilä ==
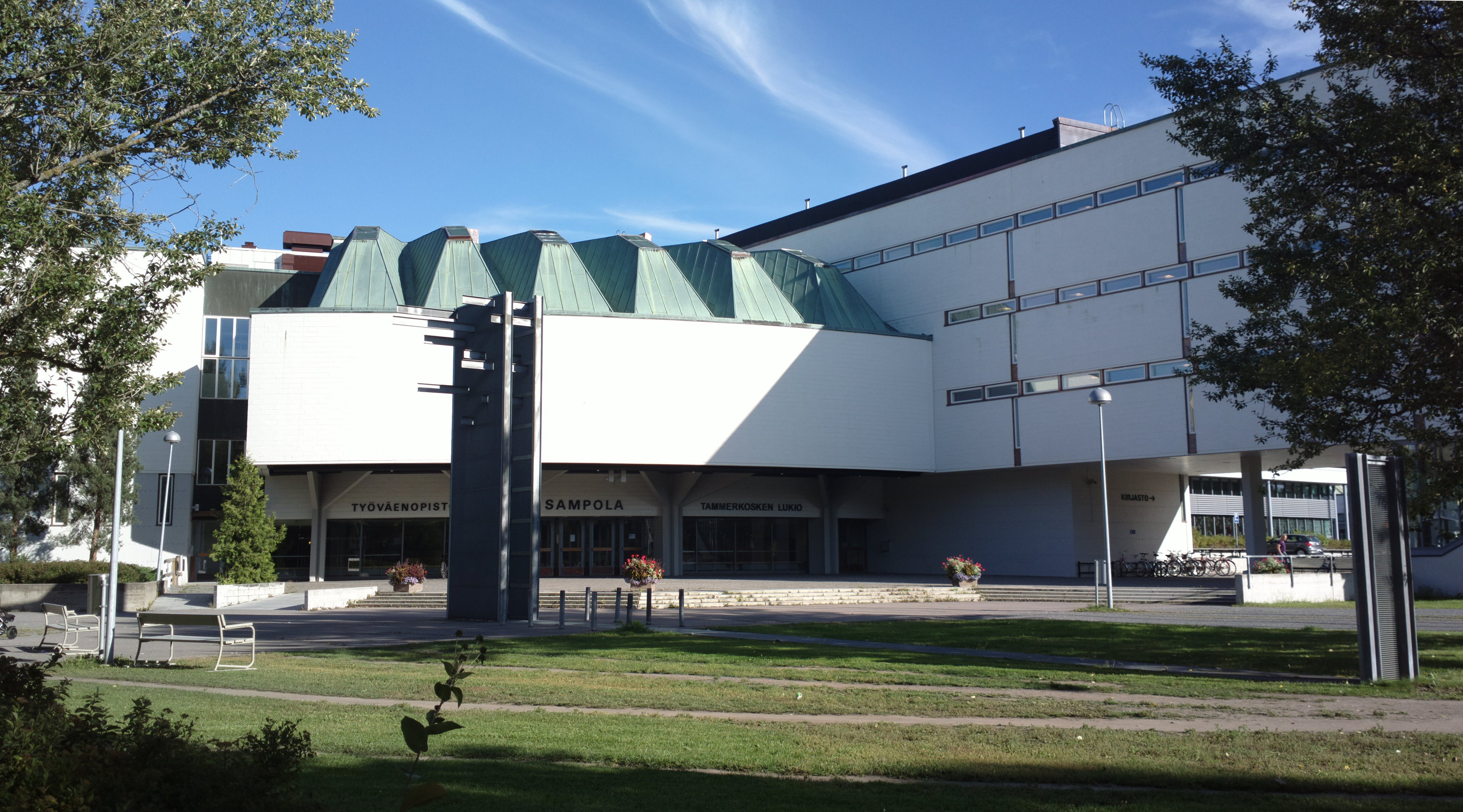
Sampola school and adult education centre, Tampere 1960.

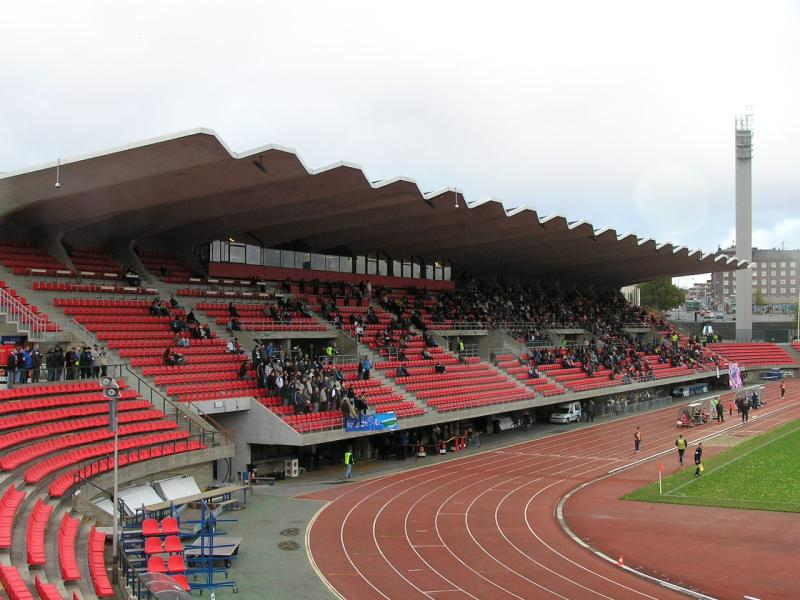
Ratina Stadium, Tampere, 1965.

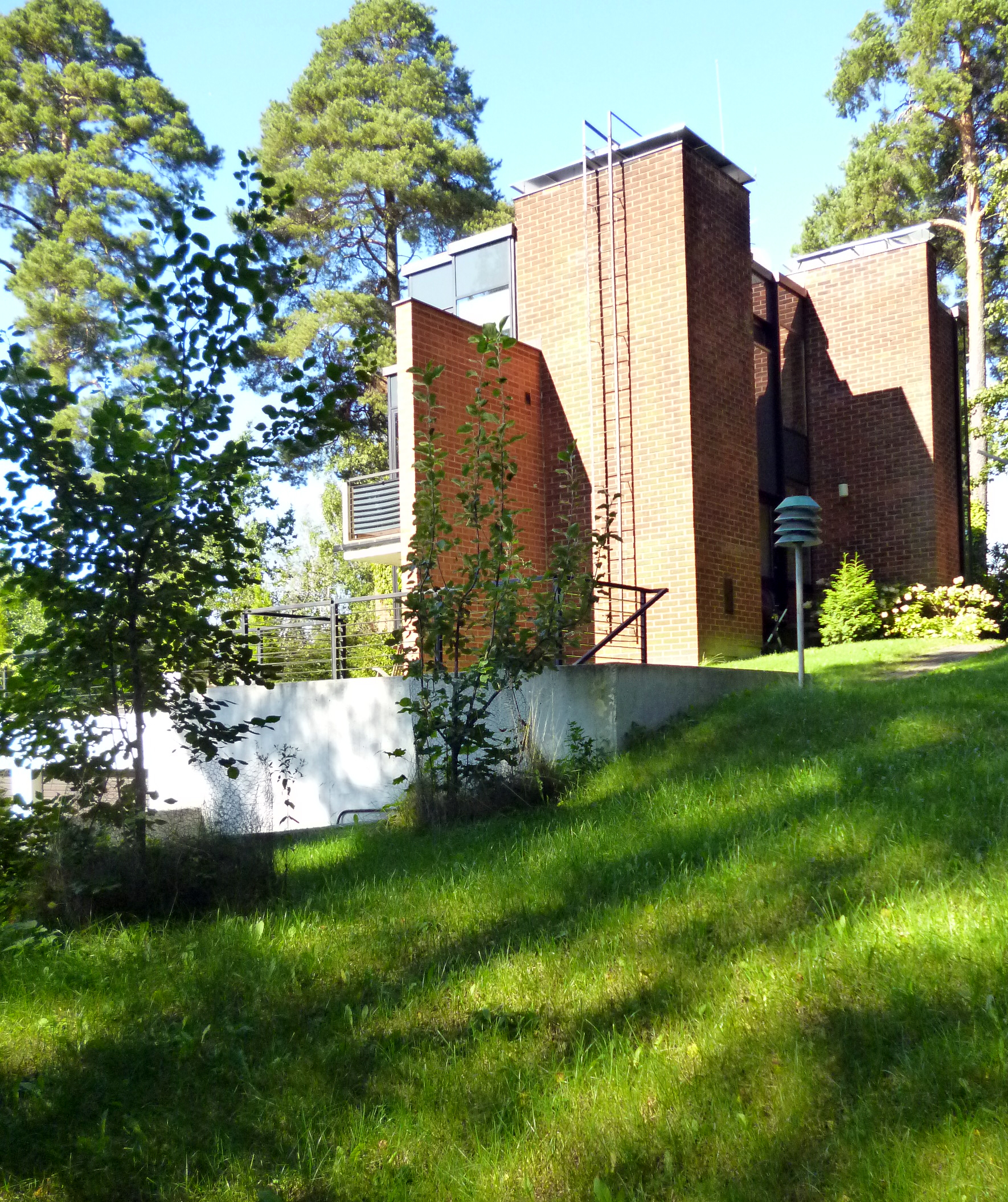
Tammisalo terraced housing, Helsinki, 1966.

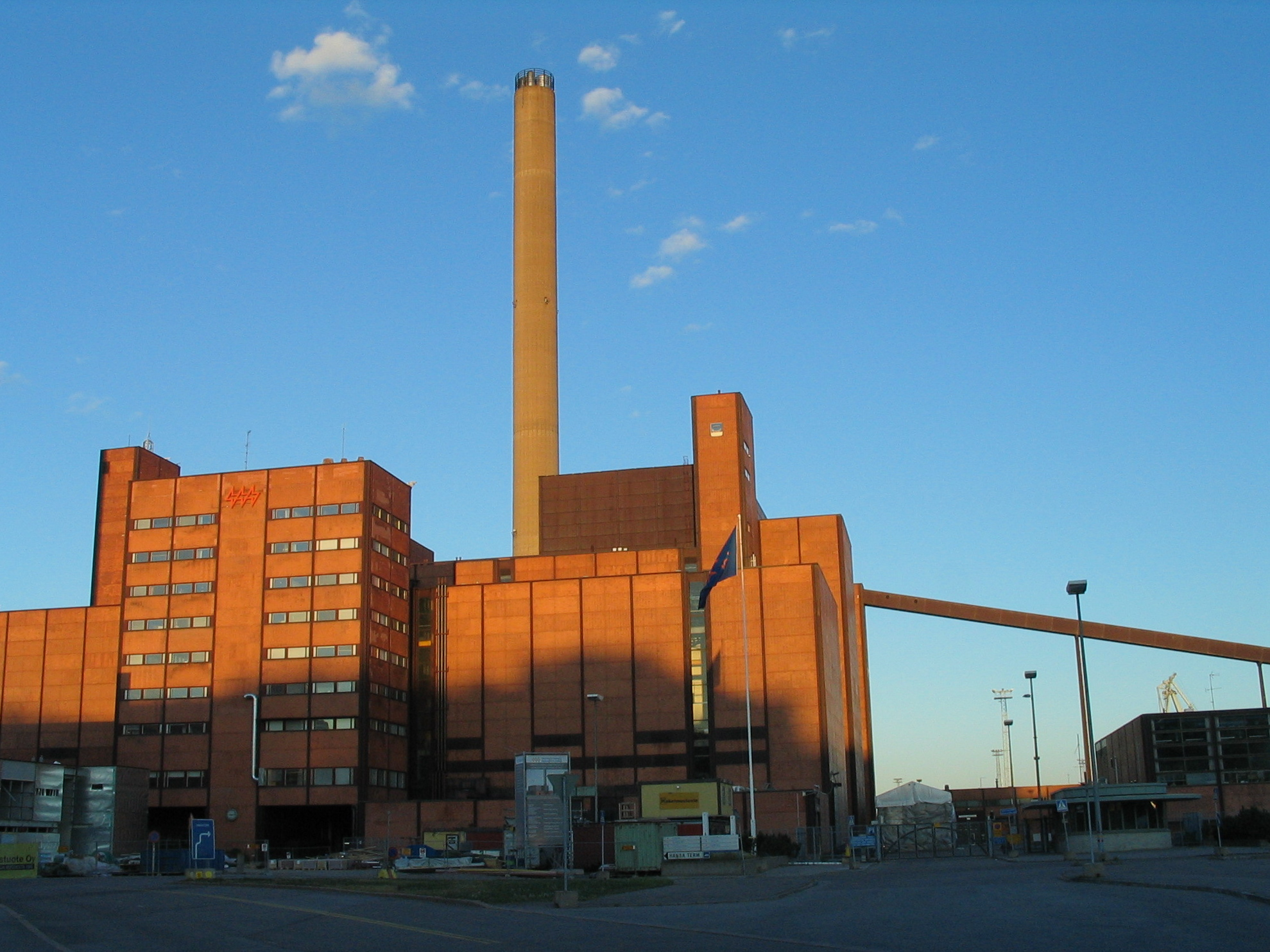
Hanasaari B power station, Helsinki, 1974.

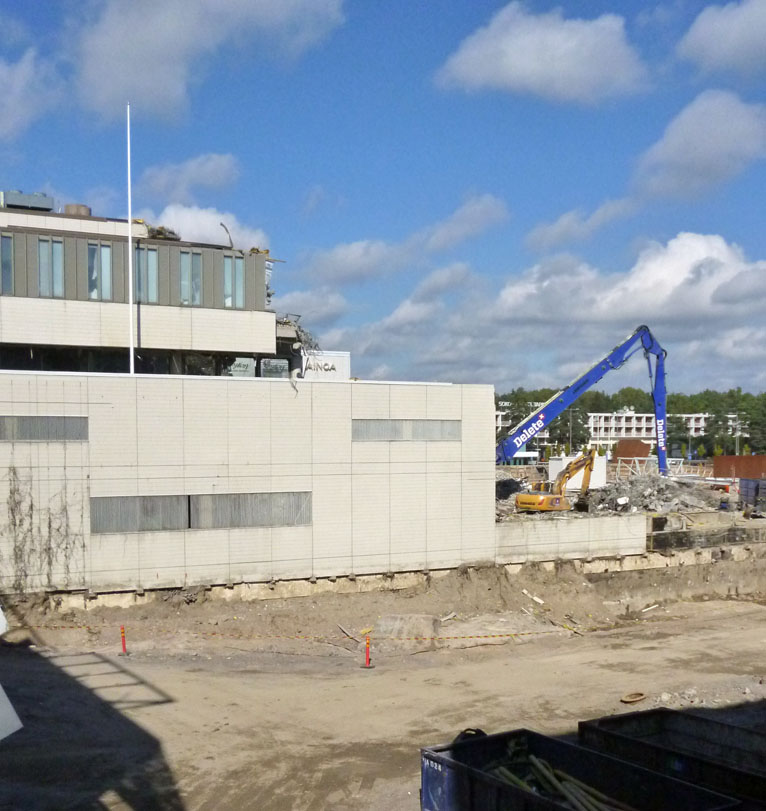
Suomen Sokeri HQ, Tapiola, 1980 (demolished 2014)

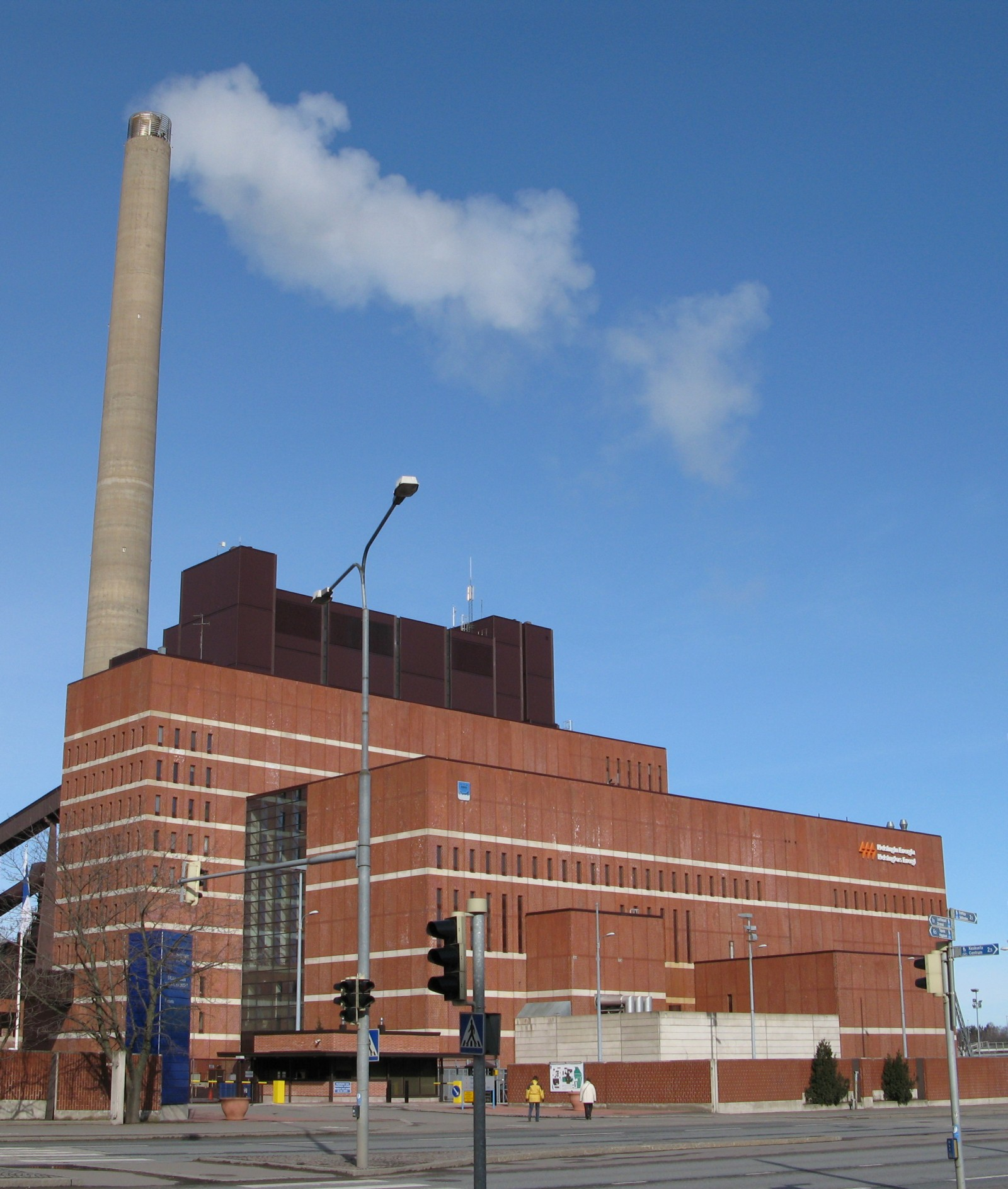
Salmisaari power station, Helsinki, 1985.
