= Pekka Salminen =

Finnish architect and professor of architecture (1937–2024)

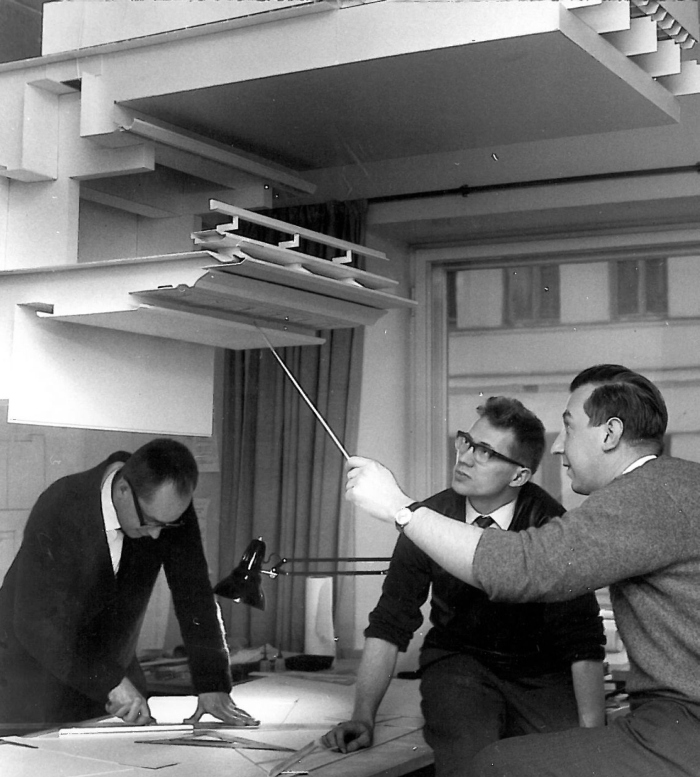
- Planning Helsinki City Theatre in 1964: from left, Jukka Siivola, Salminen and Timo Penttilä
- Born: Peka Salminen; 11 August 1937; Tampere, Finland
- Died: 30 May 2024 (aged 86)
- Occupation: Architect
- Practice: PES Architects
- Buildings: Wuxi Grand Theatre, China; Marienkirche, Neubrandenburg, Germany

Pekka Salminen (11 August 1937 – 30 May 2024) was a Finnish Professor of Architecture and founder and a senior partner of PES-Architects, formed in 1968, in Helsinki, Finland.

== Main works ==
- Lahti Ski Museum, Finland, 1999
- Wuxi Grand Theatre, Wuxi, China 2008–2012
- Marienkirche, Neubrandenburg, Germany

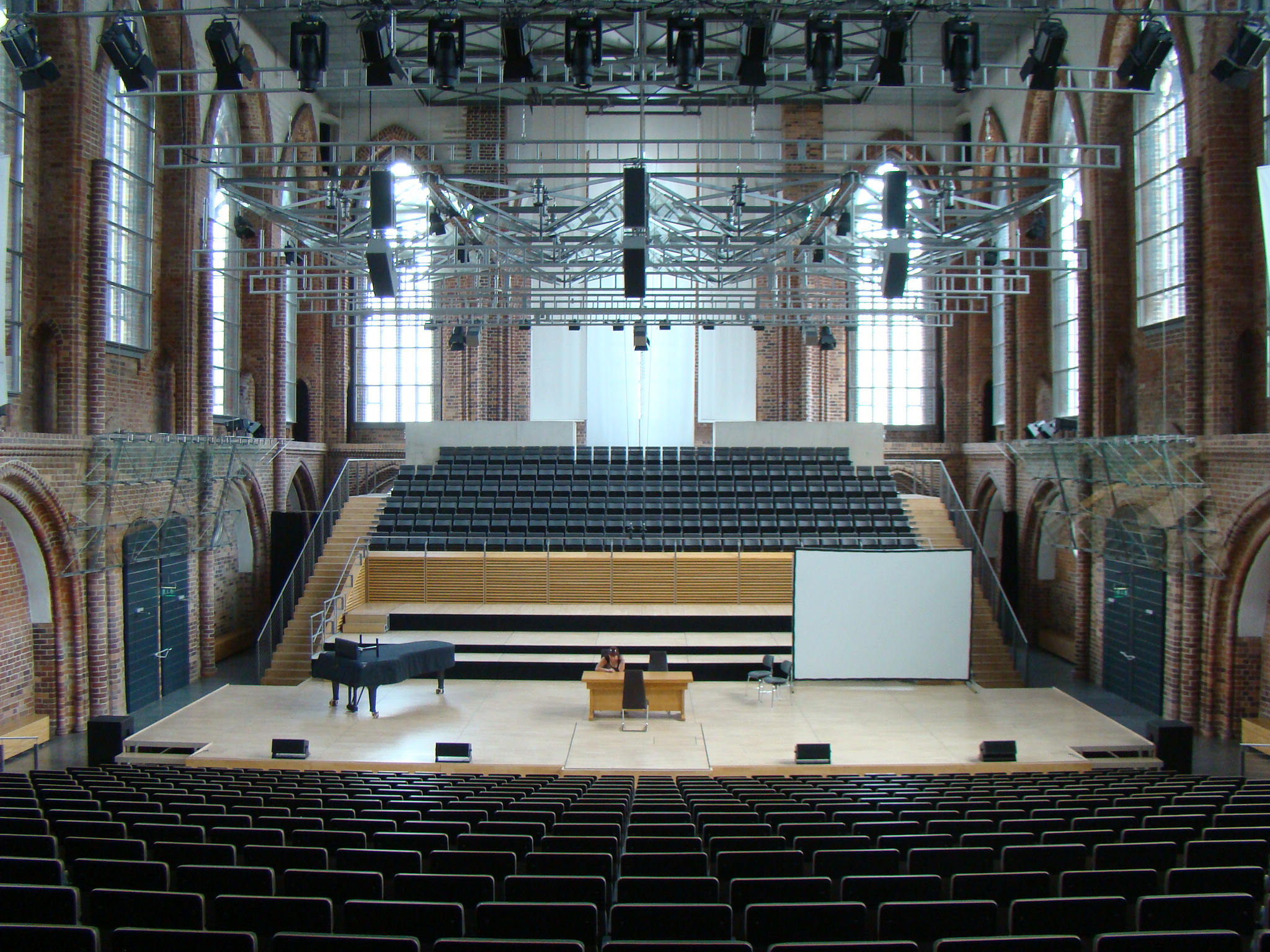
Marienkirche, Germany
