= Neubrandenburg Regional Museum =

Neubrandenburg Regional Museum Regionalmuseum Neubrandenburg
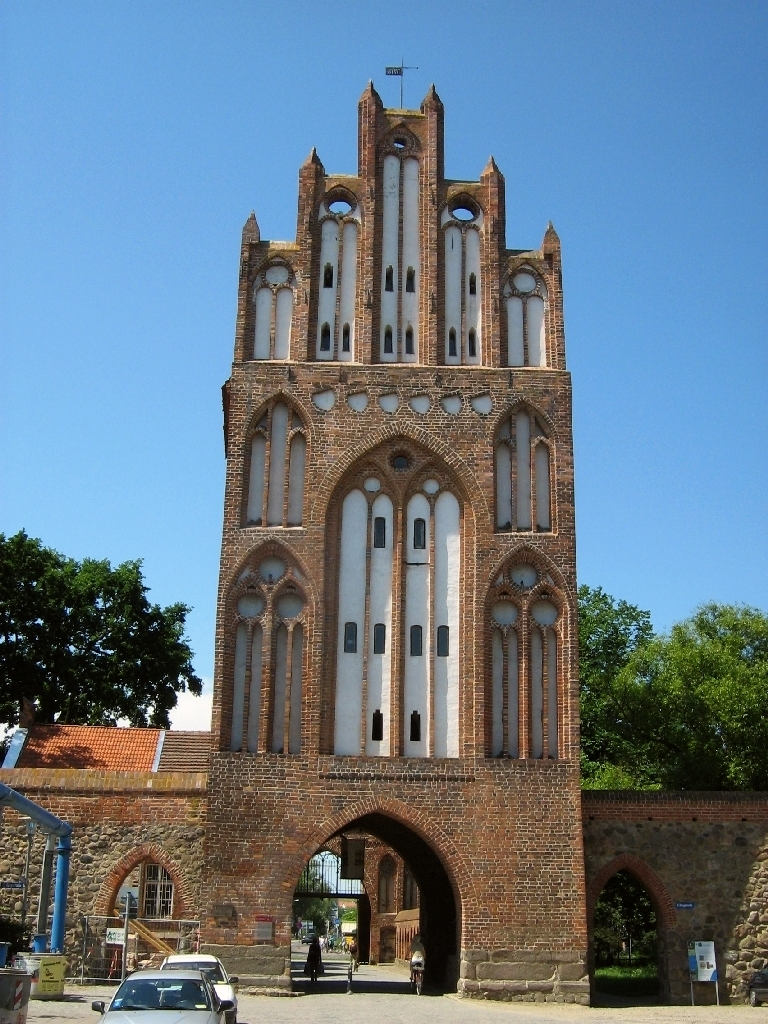
- Main tower of the Treptow Gate
- Established: 1873
- Location: Neubrandenburg
- Type: Cultural history museum
- Director: Rolf Voß
- Website: www.museum-neubrandenburg.de

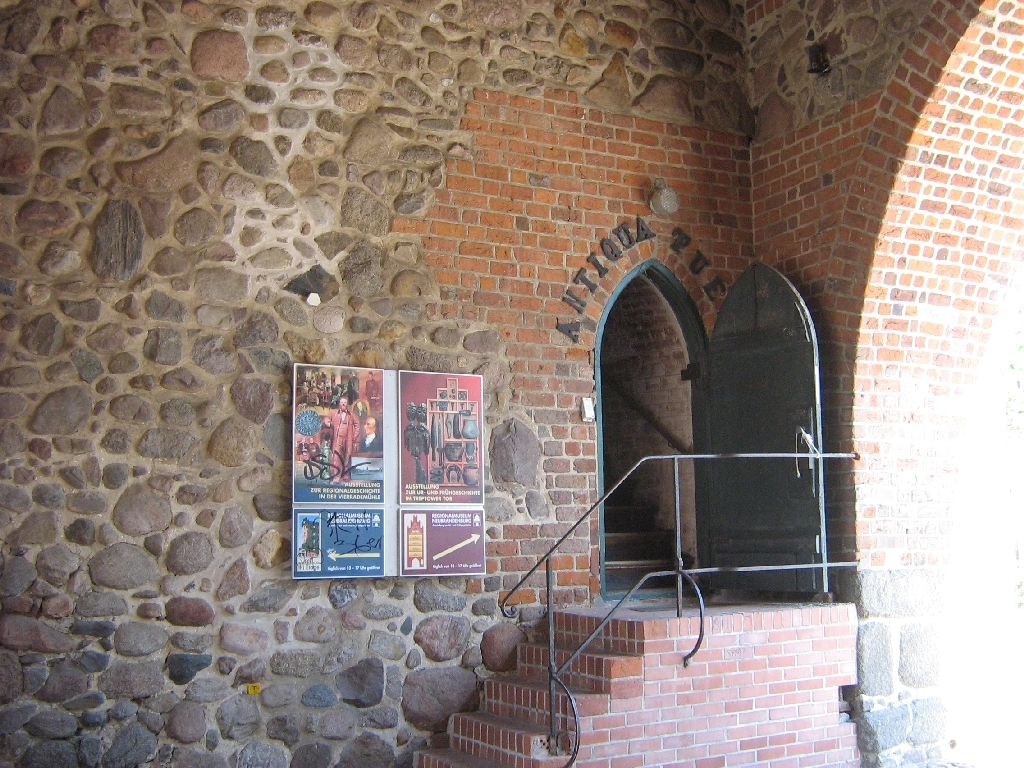
Museum entrance

The Neubrandenburg Regional Museum (German: Regionalmuseum Neubrandenburg) is a cultural history museum in Neubrandenburg, Germany. It was formed in 1872 at the initiative of the Neubrandenburg Museum Society (Neubrandenburger Museumsvereins) founded for that purpose. The catchment area and operation of the museum, whose name changed several times in the course of history, was regionally oriented from the start. In 1873, the society opened a permanent exhibition on the history of the region in the main tower of the Treptow Gate (Treptower Tor) in Neubrandenburg. It was the first civic museum in the county of Mecklenburg-Strelitz. Until the mid-1930s the museum remained in the hands of the society and did not transfer to the town until the society wound itself up under Nazi pressure.

Until 1989 the Neubrandenburg Museum, as the Historical District Museum (Historisches Bezirksmuseum), took on leading roles for other museums in the district of Neubrandenburg. Today the Neubrandenburg Regional Museum fulfills the role of the municipal museum for Neubrandenburg with several exhibition sites, a number of initiatives and extensive collections. It is one of the oldest museums of cultural history in Mecklenburg-Vorpommern.

In addition to collections of urban history, the museum has the largest collection of non-European ethnology in Mecklenburg-Western Pomerania. The core of this collection area is the South Seas collection of the doctor Bernhard Funk.

== Literature ==
- Neubrandenburger Mosaik : Heimatkundliches Jahrbuch des Regionalmuseums Neubrandenburg. Neubrandenburg, 1975- . [Zuletzt ersch.: Nr. 34 (2010).]
- Maubach, Peter: Geschichte bewahren : 125 Jahre Museum Neubrandenburg. Neubrandenburg, 1998. [= Schriftenreihe des Regionalmuseums Neubrandenburg, Heft 29.]
