= Holmenkollen Ski Museum =

Museum in Oslo, Norway

Coordinates: 59°57′52.6″N 10°39′59.8″E

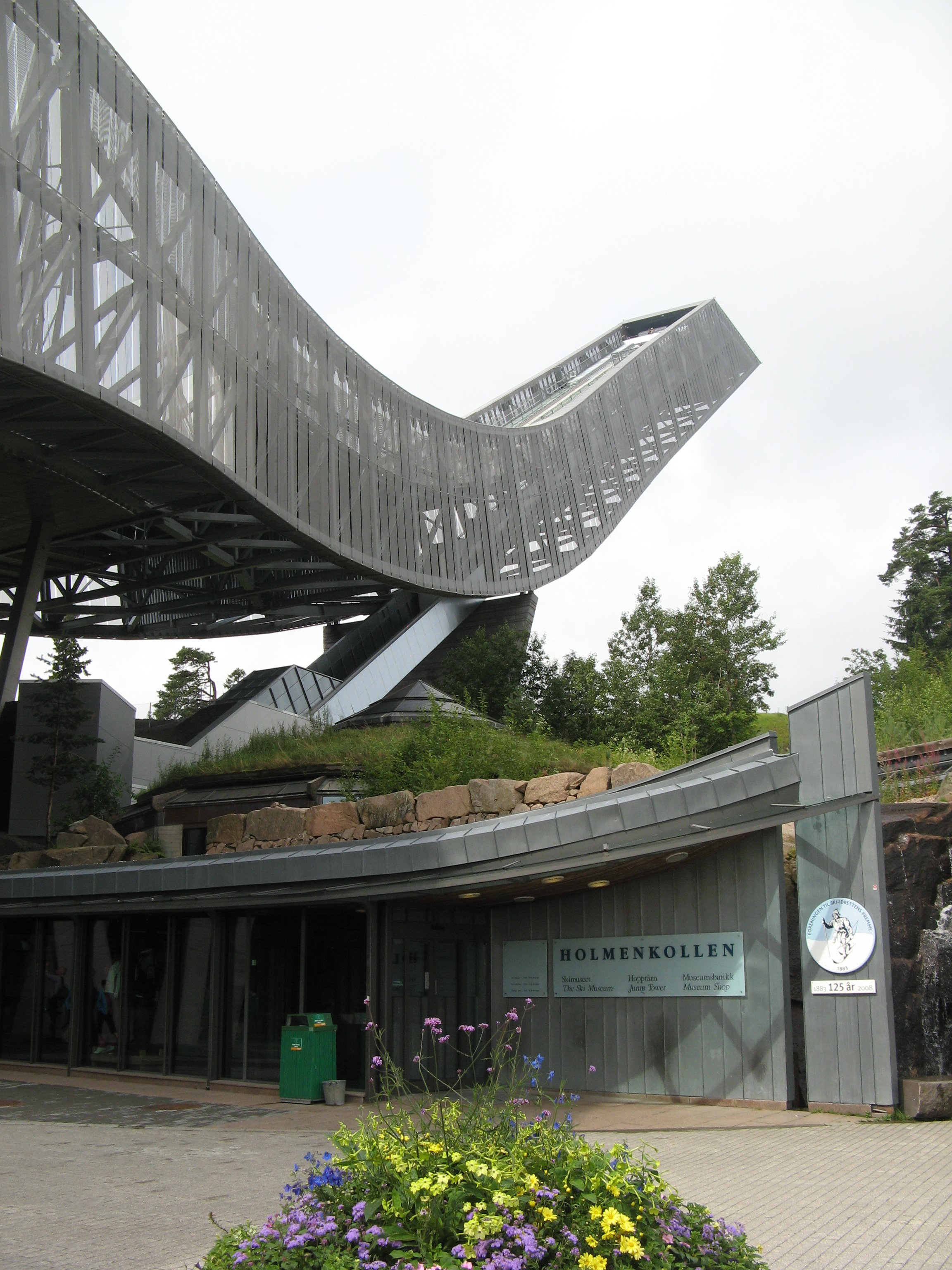
Holmenkollen ski jump

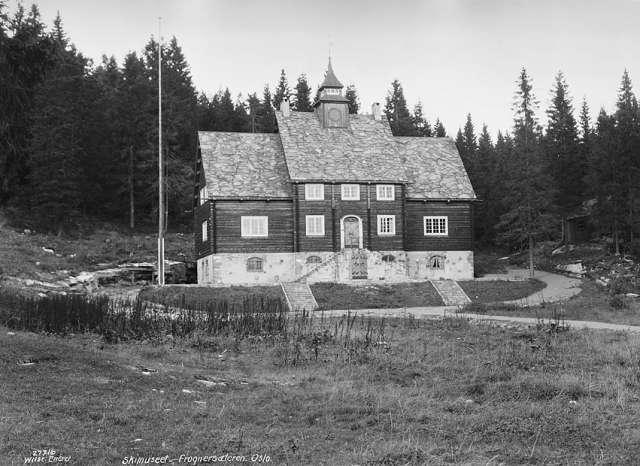
Original Ski Museum building in 1925, then located in the Frognerseteren neighbourhood

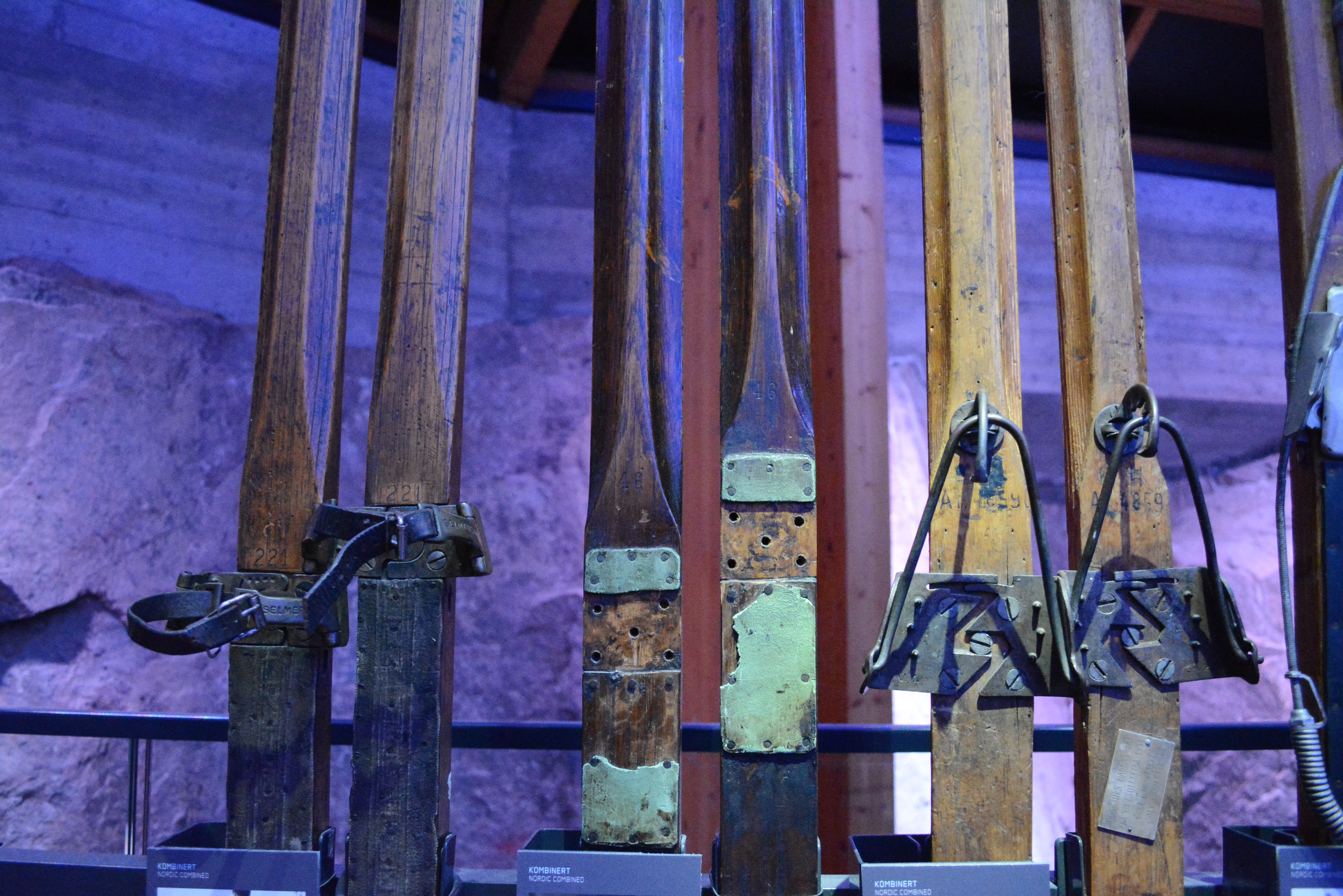
Display of skis at Holmenkollen Ski Museum

Holmenkollen Ski Museum (Norwegian: Skimuseet i Holmenkollen) is located at the base of the Holmenkollen ski jump in Oslo, Norway.

The Ski Museum was founded in 1923 and is the world's oldest ski museum. The initiator of the museum was the architect Hjalmar Welhaven. His private collection formed the foundation of the antique and historic skis on display at the museum. Until 1951, the collection was housed in a building in the Oslo neighborhood of Frognerseteren. In connection with the rebuilding of Holmenkollbakken in 1951, the museum collection was moved to new premises at Holmenkollbakken.

The museum contains 4,000 years of skiing history, starting with rock carvings dating from the Stone Age. It also displays skiers and skis from the Viking Age. Additionally it displays equipment used in the polar expeditions of both Fridtjof Nansen and Roald Amundsen. The Ski Museum is owned and operated by Skiforeningen. This association is responsible for the organization of sports, activities and events in Holmenkollen National Park.

== See also ==
- Lahti Ski Museum

== Other sources ==
- Vaage, Jakob; Kristensen, Tom (1992) Holmenkollen: historien og resultatene (Stabekk: De norske bokklubben) ISBN 82-525-1678-5.
