= Nordic skiing at the 1960 Winter Olympics =

At the 1960 Winter Olympics, eight Nordic skiing events were contested – six cross-country skiing events, one ski jumping event, and one Nordic combined event.

Nordic skiing discipline	Men's events	Women's events
Cross-country skiing	• 15 km	• 10 km
Cross-country skiing	• 30 km	• 10 km
Cross-country skiing	• 50 km	• 10 km
Cross-country skiing	• 4 × 10 km relay	• 3 × 5 km relay
Ski jumping	• Large hill (80 m)	
Nordic combined	• Individual	

== Medal summary ==
=== Men's events ===
==== Cross-country skiing ====
Event	Gold	Silver	Bronze
15 km	Håkon Brusveen; Norway	Sixten Jernberg; Sweden	Veikko Hakulinen; Finland
30 km	Sixten Jernberg; Sweden	Rolf Rämgård; Sweden	Nikolay Anikin; Soviet Union
50 km	Kalevi Hämäläinen; Finland	Veikko Hakulinen; Finland	Rolf Rämgård; Sweden
4 × 10 km relay	Finland; Toimi Alatalo; Eero Mäntyranta; Väinö Huhtala; Veikko Hakulinen	Norway; Harald Grønningen; Hallgeir Brenden; Einar Østby; Håkon Brusveen	Soviet Union; Anatoly Shelyukhin; Gennady Vaganov; Aleksey Kuznetsov; Nikolay Anikin

==== Ski jumping ====
Event	Gold	Silver	Bronze
Normal hill	Helmut Recknagel; United Team of Germany	Niilo Halonen; Finland	Otto Leodolter; Austria

==== Nordic combined ====
Event	Gold	Silver	Bronze
Individual	Georg Thoma; United Team of Germany	Tormod Knutsen; Norway	Nikolay Gusakov; Soviet Union

=== Women's events ===
==== Cross-country skiing ====
Event	Gold	Silver	Bronze
10 km	Marija Gusakova; Soviet Union	Liubov Baranova; Soviet Union	Radia Eroshina; Soviet Union
3 × 5 km relay	Sweden; Irma Johansson; Britt Strandberg; Sonja Ruthström-Edström	Soviet Union; Radia Eroshina; Marija Gusakova; Liubov Baranova	Finland; Siiri Rantanen; Eeva Ruoppa; Toini Pöysti
