= Sweden at the 1960 Winter Olympics =

- IOC code: SWE
- NOC: Swedish Olympic Committee
- Website: www.sok.se (in Swedish and English)

in Squaw Valley
- Competitors: 47 (41 men, 6 women) in 6 sports
- Flag bearers: Einar Granath, ice hockey
- Medals Ranked 5th: Gold 3 Silver 2 Bronze 2 Total 7

Winter Olympics appearances (overview)
- 1924; 1928; 1932; 1936; 1948; 1952; 1956; 1960; 1964; 1968; 1972; 1976; 1980; 1984; 1988; 1992; 1994; 1998; 2002; 2006; 2010; 2014; 2018; 2022; 2026

Sweden competed at the 1960 Winter Olympics in Squaw Valley, United States.

== Medalists ==
| Medal | Name | Sport | Event |
|---|---|---|---|
| Gold | Klas Lestander | Biathlon | Men's 20 km |
| Gold | Sixten Jernberg | Cross-country skiing | Men's 30 km |
| Gold | Irma Johansson; Britt Strandberg; Sonja Ruthström-Edström | Cross-country skiing | Women's 3 x 5 km relay |
| Silver | Sixten Jernberg | Cross-country skiing | Men's 15 km |
| Silver | Rolf Rämgård | Cross-country skiing | Men's 30 km |
| Bronze | Rolf Rämgård | Cross-country skiing | Men's 50 km |
| Bronze | Kjell Bäckman | Speed skating | Men's 10 000 m |

== Biathlon ==
Men

| Event | Athlete | Time | Missed targets | Adjusted time ^{1} | Rank |
|---|---|---|---|---|---|
| 20 km | Adolf Wiklund | 1'30:07.8 | 12 | 1'54:07.8 | 19 |
| 20 km | Sven Agge | 1'30:21.7 | 9 | 1'48:21.7 | 16 |
| 20 km | Tage Lundin | 1'33:56.3 | 6 | 1'45:56.3 | 12 |
| 20 km | Klas Lestander | 1'33:21.6 | 0 | 1'33:21.6 | 1st place, gold medalist(s) |

^{1} Two minutes added per missed target.

== Cross-country skiing ==
Men

| Event | Athlete | Race | |
| Event | Athlete | Time | Rank |
|---|---|---|---|
| 15 km | Per-Erik Larsson | 53:49.8 | 17 |
| 15 km | Rolf Rämgård | 52:47.3 | 8 |
| 15 km | Janne Stefansson | 52:41.0 | 7 |
| 15 km | Sixten Jernberg | 51:58.6 | 2nd place, silver medalist(s) |
| 30 km | Allan Andersson | 1'57:09.9 | 13 |
| 30 km | Lennart Larsson | 1'53:53.2 | 5 |
| 30 km | Rolf Rämgård | 1'51:16.9 | 2nd place, silver medalist(s) |
| 30 km | Sixten Jernberg | 1'51:03.9 | 1st place, gold medalist(s) |
| 50 km | Assar Rönnlund | 3'09:46.6 | 12 |
| 50 km | Sixten Jernberg | 3'05:18.0 | 5 |
| 50 km | Lennart Larsson | 3'03:27.9 | 4 |
| 50 km | Rolf Rämgård | 3'02:46.7 | 3rd place, bronze medalist(s) |

Men's 4 × 10 km relay

| Athletes | Race | |
| Athletes | Time | Rank |
|---|---|---|
| Lars Olsson; Janne Stefansson; Lennart Larsson; Sixten Jernberg | 2'21:31.8 | 4 |

Women

| Event | Athlete | Race | |
| Event | Athlete | Time | Rank |
|---|---|---|---|
| 10 km | Britt Strandberg | 42:06.8 | 10 |
| 10 km | Irma Johansson | 41:08.3 | 8 |
| 10 km | Barbro Martinsson | 41:06.2 | 7 |
| 10 km | Sonja Ruthström-Edström | 40:35.5 | 5 |

Women's 3 x 5 km relay

| Athletes | Race | |
| Athletes | Time | Rank |
|---|---|---|
| Irma Johansson; Britt Strandberg; Sonja Ruthström-Edström | 1'04:21.4 | 1st place, gold medalist(s) |

== Ice hockey ==
Summary

| Team | Event | First round | | | Final round / Consolation round | | | | | |
| Team | Event | Opposition Score | Opposition Score | Rank | Opposition Score | Opposition Score | Opposition Score | Opposition Score | Opposition Score | Rank |
|---|---|---|---|---|---|---|---|---|---|---|
| Sweden men's | Men's tournament | Canada; L 2–5 | Japan; W 19–0 | 2 Q FR | United States; L 3–6 | Soviet Union; T 2–2 | Czechoslovakia; L 1–3 | Canada; L 5–6 | Germany; W 8–2 | 5 |

=== Group A ===
Top two teams (shaded ones) from each group advanced to the final round and played for 1st-6th places, other teams played in the consolation round.

| Rank | Team | Pld | W | L | T | GF | GA | Pts |
|---|---|---|---|---|---|---|---|---|
| 1 | Canada | 2 | 2 | 0 | 0 | 24 | 3 | 4 |
| 2 | Sweden | 2 | 1 | 1 | 0 | 21 | 5 | 2 |
| 3 | Japan | 2 | 0 | 2 | 0 | 1 | 38 | 0 |

- Canada 5–2 Sweden
- Sweden 19–0 Japan

=== Final round ===
| Rank | Team | Pld | W | L | T | GF | GA | Pts |
|---|---|---|---|---|---|---|---|---|
| 1 | United States | 5 | 5 | 0 | 0 | 29 | 11 | 10 |
| 2 | Canada | 5 | 4 | 1 | 0 | 31 | 12 | 8 |
| 3 | Soviet Union | 5 | 2 | 2 | 1 | 24 | 19 | 5 |
| 4 | Czechoslovakia | 5 | 2 | 3 | 0 | 21 | 23 | 4 |
| 5 | Sweden | 5 | 1 | 3 | 1 | 19 | 19 | 3 |
| 6 | Germany | 5 | 0 | 5 | 0 | 5 | 45 | 0 |

- USA 6–3 Sweden
- USSR 2–2 Sweden
- Czechoslovakia 3–1 Sweden
- Canada 6–5 Sweden
- Sweden 8–2 Germany (UTG)

=== Leading scorers ===
| Rk | Team | GP | G | A | Pts |
|---|---|---|---|---|---|
| 5th | (Sweden) Lars Lundvall | 7 | 8 | 4 | 12 |
| 7th | (Sweden) Nisse Nilsson | 7 | 7 | 5 | 12 |
| 12th | (Sweden) Ronald Pettersson | 7 | 4 | 8 | 12 |

| Contestants; Anders Andersson; Lasse Björn; Gert Blomé; Sigurd Bröms; Einar Granath; Sven Johansson; Bengt Lindqvist; Lars-Eric Lundvall; Nils Nilsson; Bert-Ola Nordlander; Carl-Göran Öberg; Ronald Pettersson; Ulf Sterner; Roland Stoltz; Hans Svedberg; Kjell Svensson; Sune Wretling |

== Nordic combined ==
Events:

- normal hill ski jumping (three jumps, best two counted and shown here)
- 15 km cross-country skiing

| Athlete | Event | Ski jumping | | | | Cross-country | | | Total | |
| Athlete | Event | Distance 1 | Distance 2 | Points | Rank | Time | Points | Rank | Points | Rank |
|---|---|---|---|---|---|---|---|---|---|---|
| Lars Dahlqvist | Individual | 59.5 | 63.5 | 201.5 | 20 | 59:46.0 | 235.032 | 7 | 436.532 | 8 |
| Bengt Eriksson | Individual | 63.5 | 64.0 | 213.0 | 8 | 1'03:27.9 | 220.710 | 19 | 433.710 | 10 |

== Ski jumping ==
| Athlete | Event | Jump 1 | | | Jump 2 | | | Total | |
| Athlete | Event | Distance | Points | Rank | Distance | Points | Rank | Points | Rank |
|---|---|---|---|---|---|---|---|---|---|
| Inge Lindqvist | Normal hill | 79.5 | 90.4 | 36 | 79.0 | 99.7 | 26 | 190.1 | 29 |
| Kjell Sjöberg | Normal hill | 78.5 | 94.1 | 31 | 46.0 fall | 33.8 | 45 | 127.9 | 45 |
| Bengt Eriksson | Normal hill | 83.5 | 99.6 | 23 | 78.0 | 102.4 | 18 | 202.0 | 19 |
| Rolf Strandberg | Normal hill | 86.5 | 100.0 | 20 | 81.0 | 104.8 | 11 | 204.8 | 18 |

== Speed skating ==
Men

| Event | Athlete | Race | |
| Event | Athlete | Time | Rank |
|---|---|---|---|
| 500 m | Gunnar Sjölin | 43.4 | 33 |
| 500 m | Olle Dahlberg | 43.1 | 30 |
| 500 m | Per-Olof Brogren | 42.7 | 26 |
| 500 m | Hans Wilhelmsson | 40.5 | 4 |
| 1500 m | Bo Karenus | 2:21.1 | 28 |
| 1500 m | Olle Dahlberg | 2:18.3 | 18 |
| 1500 m | Gunnar Sjölin | 2:16.5 | 15 |
| 1500 m | Per-Olof Brogren | 2:13.1 | 5 |
| 5000 m | Olle Dahlberg | 8:17.0 | 13 |
| 5000 m | Kjell Bäckman | 8:16.0 | 12 |
| 5000 m | Ivar Nilsson | 8:09.1 | 7 |
| 10,000 m | Olle Dahlberg | 16:34.6 | 7 |
| 10,000 m | Ivar Nilsson | 16:26.0 | 4 |
| 10,000 m | Kjell Bäckman | 16:14.2 | 3rd place, bronze medalist(s) |

Women

| Event | Athlete | Race | |
| Event | Athlete | Time | Rank |
|---|---|---|---|
| 500 m | Elsa Einarsson | DNF | – |
| 500 m | Christina Lindblom-Scherling | 48.7 | 15 |
| 1000 m | Elsa Einarsson | 1:38.0 | 12 |
| 1000 m | Christina Lindblom-Scherling | 1:37.5 | 11 |
| 1500 m | Elsa Einarsson | 2:32.9 | 9 |
| 1500 m | Christina Lindblom-Scherling | 2:31.5 | 7 |
| 3000 m | Elsa Einarsson | 5:32.2 | 11 |
| 3000 m | Christina Lindblom-Scherling | 5:25.5 | 5 |
