= McKinney Creek Stadium =

Temporary ski stadium in California

McKinney Creek Stadium was a temporary ski stadium located at Tahoma, California, in the United States. Built in 1959, it was used for cross-country skiing, Nordic combined, and biathlon at the 1960 Winter Olympics in Squaw Valley.

== History ==
As Squaw Valley was an undeveloped area at the time of being awarded the Olympics, the organizing committee was free to build a tailor-made Olympic resort. The organizing committee originally intended to house all events in Squaw Valley proper, but real estate developments in Squaw Valley made this difficult. In 1958 the organizing committee therefore decided to move all cross-country and biathlon events to McKinney Creek.

Rolf Gerlofsen had surveyed the area in March 1957, and work on the biathlon tracks and facilities was undertaken and completed during the summer of 1958. It was the first time that pull targets were installed for a biathlon competition.

Work on the stadium began in August 1959. Plans for the tracks were approved by the International Ski Federation's Knut Korsvold and Sigge Bergman, after which construction of the trails could start in the summer 1959. Trial events were undertaken in 1959, in which it was found that mechanical track preparation was more efficient than manual, given that there was at least 45 centimetres (18 inches) of snow. After the Olympics, the stadium was dismounted.

== Facilities ==
McKinney Creek Stadium was located immediately off California State Route 89, 19 kilometers (12 miles) south of Squaw Valley. It was the only venue to not be located in the ski resort itself. The stadium was 250 meters (820 ft) long and between 34 and 45 meters (112 and 148 ft) wide. Bleachers were erected on one side of the finish line with space for 1,000 spectators and 200 press officers. A 16 by 4 meters (52 by 13 ft) scoreboard was built behind the finish line, which at any given time showed the latest times and the ten best results. Flags for all participating nations at the games were hoisted along the stadium.

The main building was the Timing Building, which consisted of a calculations room, a communications room, an office for the race secretary in addition to areas for timing staff and equipment. The upper section was used by the public announcer and featured sixteen radio booths. Two 6 by 15 meters (20 by 49 ft) Quonset huts with a total sixteen rooms were built for competitors for waxing, resting and changing. Lack of water caused the stadium to lack showers. An identically sized Quonset hut was built for administration personnel and course preparation works. A larger 6 by 20 meters (20 by 66 ft) Quonset hut was built for the press, which included typewriters, teletype machines, telephones and a darkroom.

The biathlon course had four shooting ranges along the 20-kilometer (12 mi) course. A 200-meter (660 ft) range was installed at 6.5 kilometers (4.0 mi), a 250-meter (820 ft) range at 9.5 kilometers (5.9 mi), a 150-meter (490 ft) range at 12.5 kilometers (7.8 mi) and a 100-meter (330 ft) range at 15 kilometers (9.3 mi). The ranges had 15 pull-type targets with a "sleeve and plunger" system with five recharges. This allowed up to 75 participants in the race. An additional practice range was built in the Squaw Valley–Deer Park area, in addition to the 250-meter (820 ft) range being available for training. Coordination of the shooting station was undertaken by four groups of twenty men from the United States Air Force Rifle School. First aid stations were installed at each range.

Track preparation was undertaken every evening before the events. Crews were assigned to sections of tracks, with the responsibility of skiing the courses one and a half hours before start, policing the section and removing markers after the event. Each event was color-coded and all marking and material for each event used the colors for visual identification. Training tracks were available in the McKinney Park area and the Squaw Valley–Deer Park area. Both official electronic and unofficial manual timing was used. Interval times were taken at 5-kilometer (3.1 mi) intervals and phoned to the stadium.

== Events ==
Cross-country skiing consisted of six events—four for men and two for women, including a relay race for both genders. The men's 30 kilometer saw a Swedish double won by Sixten Jernberg ahead of Rolf Rämgård. In the men's 15 kilometer, Jernberg finished second after Norway's Hakon Brusveen. The men's 4 × 10 kilometer relay saw Finland win ahead of Norway and the Soviet Union. The United States finished last of the eleven teams. The final men's race was the men's 50 kilometer, which saw a Finnish double with Kalevi Hämäläinen win ahead of Veikko Hakulinen followed by three Swedes. The men's relay saw the largest crowd, of 3,000 spectators.

The women's 10 kilometer saw the Soviet Union win the four top positions, with Maria Gusakova winning gold and Lyubov Kozyreva winning silver. Five teams entered the women's 3 × 5 kilometer relay. Despite the Soviet dominance in the individual race, Sweden was successful at beating the Soviet Union, ahead of Finland, Poland and Germany.

The ski jumping part of the Nordic combined took place at Papoose Peak Jumps in Squaw Valley. Germany's Georg Thoma won the ski jumping event and succeeded at defending the gold through the 15 kilometer cross-country race. The Soviet Union's Dmitriy Kochkin finished second after the jumps, but was relegated to fifth after the cross-country event, with Norway's Tormod Knutsen taking silver.

The 1960 Winter Olympics saw the debut of biathlon. Thirty competitors from nine nations entered the 20 kilometer race, which was undertaken with one-minute interval start. The race was won by Klas Lestander of Sweden ahead of Finland's Antti Tyrvainen and four Soviet biathletes.
