= Papoose Peak Jumps =

Ski jumping hill located at Palisades Tahoe

Coordinates: 39°11′38″N 120°13′52″W

- Location: Little Papoose Peak; Squaw Valley; United States
- Opened: 1958
- Renovated: 1975
- Closed: 1976
- Demolished: Yes

Size
- K–point: K80
- Hill size: K80, K60, K40
- Hill record: Jim Denney (99.0 m in 1976)

Top events
- Olympics: 1960

Papoose Peak Jumps was a ski jumping hill at Palisades Tahoe in the US state of California. The hill had three jumps with K-points of 80, 60 and 40 meters respectively. It was built on the hillside of Little Papoose Peak for the 1960 Winter Olympics; the 80-meter hill hosted the ski jumping event and the 60-meter hill the Nordic combined event. The jump was designed by Heini Klopfer and opened in 1958. After the Olympics the venue had very little use; it was renovated for the 1976 US National Ski Jumping Championships, but falling into disrepair it was demolished to make room for the Far East Express ski lift.

== History ==
As Squaw Valley was an undeveloped area when it was awarded the Olympics, the organizing committee was free to design a tailor-made Olympic resort. Heini Klopfer from Oberstdorf southwest of Munich, Germany was hired to design the ski jumping hills, which he finished in early 1957. He chose to locate it on the hill-side of Little Papoose Peak, opposite Blyth Arena. He described the location as "the type of hill one always seeks but seldom finds". The construction contract was awarded to Diversified Builders, who constructed the jumps during the summer and fall of 1958.

Papoose Peak Jumps was the first Olympic ski jump to have three in-runs. Minor flaws were fixed in 1959 and 1960. It was renovated ahead of the 1976 US National Championships. However it fell out of use afterwards and instead the hill was converted to a speed skiing and snowboarding hill. Later the resort's Far East Express chairlift was installed on the hill.

== Facilities ==
There were three jumps with a common out-run on the hill, each with a construction point (K-point) of 80, 60 and 40 meters respectively. It was located in the central area of the Olympic resort, next to the skating rinks and the Olympic Village. Tall trees on both sides of the hill gave good protection against the wind. The location was also ideal because of the sun was at the competitor's backs. A judges' tower was constructed on the side, which was both accessible by stairs from the bottom of the hill or from the chairlift which ran to the top of the in-runs. The hill had an overall height of 140 meters (460 ft), the in-run had a length of 113 meters (371 ft). The largest jump had a take-off angle of 8.5 degrees and a landing angle of 38 degrees.

== Events ==
The first competition on the hills was the trial Olympics in February 1959. During the 1960 Winter Olympics, the 80-meter hill was used for special jumping on 28 February and the 60-meter hill was used for Nordic combined on 22 February. The special ski jumping event was won by Helmut Recknagel of Germany, who also set a hill record of 93.5 meters (307 ft). Finland's Niilo Halonen and Austria's Otto Leodolter finished in sd and third, respectivelyecond an. In the ski jumping part of the Nordic combined event, Germany's Georg Thoma received the highest points ahead of the Soviet Union's Dmitriy Kochkin and Norway's Tormod Knutsen. The cross-country part of the event was held at McKinney Creek Stadium in Tahoma, California on Lake Tahoe. Thoma won and Knutsen finished second with Nikolay Gusakov from the Soviet Union in third place. In 1976, the US National Championships in Ski Jumping were held at the large hill, and was won by Jim Denney.
