= Eva Hög =

Finnish cross-country skier (1928–2023)

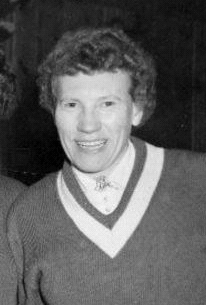
- Hög in 1956

Personal information
- Nationality: Finnish
- Born: 4 March 1928 Jakobstad, Finland
- Died: June 2023 (aged 95) Pedersöre, Finland

Sport
- Sport: Cross-country skiing

Eva Hög (4 March 1928 – June 2023) was a Finnish cross-country skier. She competed in the women's 10 kilometres at the 1960 Winter Olympics.

Hög died in June 2023, at the age of 95.

== Cross-country skiing results ==
=== Olympic Games ===
Year	Age	10 km	3 × 5 km relay
1960	32	17	—

=== World Championships ===
Year	Age	10 km	3 × 5 km relay
1958	30	9	—
