= Krzeptowski =

Krzeptowski (feminine: Krzeptowska; plural: Krzeptowscy) is a surname. Notable people with the surname include:

- Andrzej Krzeptowski (disambiguation), multiple individuals
- Anna Krzeptowska-Żebracka (1938–2017), Polish cross-country skier
- Jan Krzeptowski (1809–1894), Polish Goral musician and storyteller
- Józef Daniel Krzeptowski (1921–2002), Polish skier
- Zofia Krzeptowska (born 1934), Polish cross-country skier
