= Sonnhilde Hausschild-Kallus =

German skier (1935–2007)

Personal information
- Nationality: German
- Born: 1 September 1935 Nassau, Germany
- Died: 20 June 2007 (aged 71) Nassau, Germany

Sport
- Sport: Cross-country skiing

Sonnhilde Hausschild-Kallus (1 September 1935 – 20 June 2007) was a German cross-country skier. She competed at the 1956 Winter Olympics and the 1960 Winter Olympics.

== Cross-country skiing results ==
=== Olympic Games ===
Year	Age	10 km	3 × 5 km relay
1956	20	20	7
1960	24	18	5

=== World Championships ===
Year	Age	5 km	10 km	3 × 5 km relay
1958	22	—N/a	11	6
1962	26	—	—	5
