= Christa Göhler =

German cross-country skier (1935–2010)

Personal information
- Nationality: German
- Born: 18 October 1935 Frauenstein, Germany
- Died: 31 October 2010 (aged 75) Sachsen, Germany

Sport
- Sport: Cross-country skiing

Christa Göhler (18 October 1935 – 31 October 2010) was a German cross-country skier. She competed in the women's 10 kilometres at the 1960 Winter Olympics.

== Cross-country skiing results ==
=== Olympic Games ===
Year	Age	10 km	4 × 5 km relay
1960	24	DNF	—

=== World Championships ===
Year	Age	10 km	4 × 5 km relay
1958	22	17	6
