= Anna Krzeptowska-Żebracka =

Polish cross-country skier

Personal information
- Nationality: Polish
- Born: Anna Krzeptowska; 26 July 1938 Zakopane, Poland
- Died: 1 December 2017 (aged 79)
- Height: 164 cm (5 ft 5 in)
- Relative: Zofia Krzeptowska (sister)

Sport
- Sport: Cross-country skiing

Anna Krzeptowska-Żebracka (26 July 1938 – 1 December 2017) was a Polish cross-country skier. She competed in the women's 10 kilometres at the 1960 Winter Olympics. She was the sister of Zofia Krzeptowska.

== Cross-country skiing results ==
=== Olympic Games ===
Year	Age	10 km	3 × 5 km relay
1960	21	20	—
