= Maria Gusakova =

Soviet cross-country skier (1931–2022)

Medal record

Women's cross-country skiing

Representing Soviet Union

Olympic Games
Gold medal – first place	1960 Squaw Valley	10 km
Silver medal – second place	1960 Squaw Valley	3 × 5 km relay
Bronze medal – third place	1964 Innsbruck	10 km

World Championships
Gold medal – first place	1962 Zakopane	3 × 5 km relay
Silver medal – second place	1962 Zakopane	10 km
Bronze medal – third place	1962 Zakopane	5 km

Maria Ivanovna Gusakova (Russian: Мари́я Ива́новна Гусако́ва; 2 February 1931 – 8 May 2022) was a Russian cross-country skier who competed from the late 1950s to the early 1960s for VSS Spartak. She won a complete set of Winter Olympic medals as part of the Soviet team with a gold in the 10 km (1960), a silver in the 3 × 5 km relay (1960), and a bronze in the 10 km (1964). Gusakova also earned a complete set of medals at the 1962 FIS Nordic World Ski Championships with a gold in the 3 × 5 km relay, a silver in the 10 km, and a bronze in the 5 km. Her husband Nikolay Gusakov also competed at the 1960 Winter Olympics and claimed bronze in Nordic combined event.

== Biography ==
She was born in the village of Timoshkino, Shilovsky District, Ryazan Oblast.

== Career ==
She made her international debut at the 1958 World Championships and placed at tenth position in 10 km event.

She made her Olympic debut representing Soviet Union at the 1960 Summer Olympics and during when she made her Olympic debut, she wasn't considered as the top Soviet skier and wasn't a favorite or contention to win a medal at 1960 Olympics. But much to everyone's surprise, she defied the odds to win gold in the cross-country skiing women's 10km event at the 1960 Winter Olympics and managed to outclass her fellow Soviet skiers including Lyubov Kozyreva, Radya Yeroshina and Alevtina Kolchina with a strong finish. She was actually trialling around 23 minutes behind the leader at the halfway point but managed to claim the gold in dramatic finish. This eventually also marked the first instance for Soviet Union for a podium finish at an Olympic event with Soviet skiers clean sweeping the 10 km event.

She also added another medal to her tally at 1960 Olympics by claiming a silver 3 × 5 km relay event. She made her second Olympic appearance representing Soviet Union at the 1964 Winter Olympics. During the 1964 Winter Olympics, she won the bronze medal in the women's 10 km event; her third and final Olympic medal of her career.

She won a total of six Soviet national titles in her career including 10 km in 1960 and 1961, 5 km in 1960 and relay in 1958, 1962 and 1966.

== Cross-country skiing results ==
All results are sourced from the International Ski Federation (FIS).

=== Olympic Games ===
- 3 medals – (1 gold, 1 silver, 1 bronze)

Year	Age	5 km	10 km	3 × 5 km relay
1960	29	—N/a	Gold	Silver
1964	33	—	Bronze	—

=== World Championships ===
- 3 medals – (1 gold, 1 silver, 1 bronze)

Year	Age	5 km	10 km	3 × 5 km relay
1958	27	—N/a	6	—
1962	31	Bronze	Silver	Gold
