= Cross-country skiing at the 1960 Winter Olympics – Women's 10 kilometre =

Women's 10km at the VIII Olympic Winter Games
- Cross-country skiing
- Venue: McKinney Creek Stadium
- Date: February 20, 1960
- Competitors: 24 from 7 nations
- Winning time: 39:46.6

Medalists
1st place, gold medalist(s)		Maria Gusakova	Soviet Union
2nd place, silver medalist(s)		Lyubov Kozyreva	Soviet Union
3rd place, bronze medalist(s)		Radia Yeroshina	Soviet Union

The 10 kilometre cross-country skiing event was part of the cross-country skiing programme at the 1960 Winter Olympics, in Squaw Valley, California, United States. It was the third appearance of the event. The competition was held on Saturday, February 20, 1960, at the McKinney Creek Stadium.

It was a Soviet Union clean sweep of the medals with Maria Gusakova winning gold and defending champion Lyubov Kozyreva taking silver. In fact the Soviets also took fourth place through Alevtina Kolchina.

Two days later, Gusakova's husband, Nikolay Gusakov won bronze in the Nordic Combined.

== Results ==
Rank	Name	Country	Time
1	Maria Gusakova	Soviet Union	39:46.6
2	Lyubov Kozyreva	Soviet Union	40:04.2
3	Radia Yeroshina	Soviet Union	40:06.0
4	Alevtina Kolchina	Soviet Union	40:12.6
5	Sonja Ruthström-Edström	Sweden	40:35.5
6	Toini Pöysti	Finland	40:41.9
7	Barbro Martinsson	Sweden	41:06.2
8	Irma Johansson	Sweden	41:08.3
9	Krastana Stoeva	Bulgaria	41:44.0
10	Britt Strandberg	Sweden	42:06.8
11	Eeva Ruoppa	Finland	42:12.8
12	Rita Czech-Blasl	United Team of Germany	42:29.0
13	Stefania Biegun	Poland	42:45.2
14	Józefa Czerniawska-Pęksa	Poland	42:45.5
15	Siiri Rantanen	Finland	42:52.7
16	Renate Dannhauer-Borges	United Team of Germany	43:46.1
17	Eva Hög	Finland	44:05.0
18	Sonnhilde Hausschild-Kallus	United Team of Germany	44:14.6
19	Nadezhda Vasileva	Bulgaria	44:32.8
20	Anna Krzeptowska-Żebracka	Poland	44:36.1
21	Helena Gąsienica Daniel	Poland	45:08.2
22	Roza Dimova	Bulgaria	45:45.8
23	Magdolna Bartha	Hungary	47:23.2
	Christa Göhler	United Team of Germany	DNF
