= Mirja Hietamies =

Finnish cross-country skier

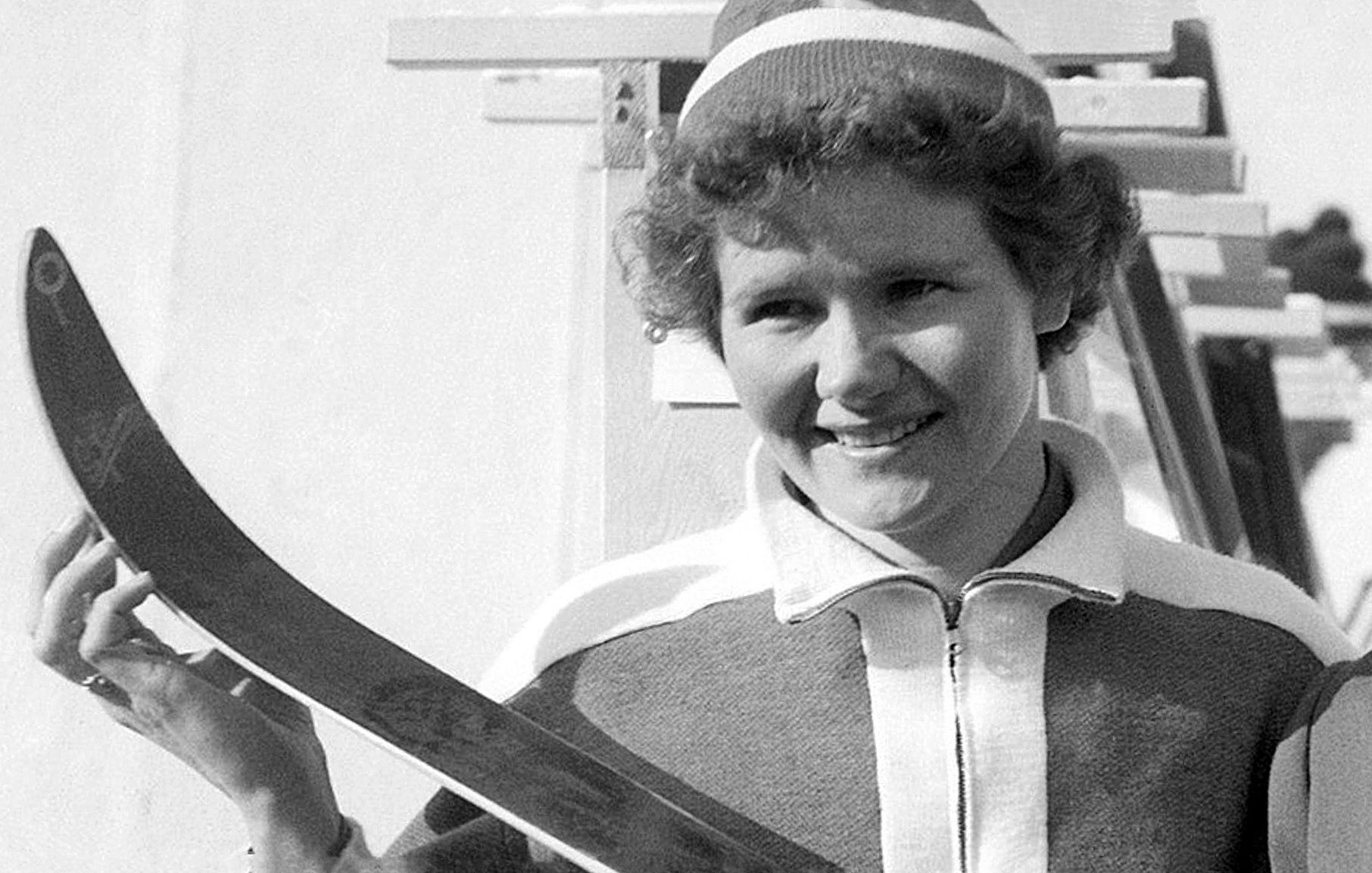

Personal information
- Full name: Mirja Kyllikki Hietamies-Eteläpää
- Born: 7 January 1931 Lemi, Finland
- Died: 14 March 2013 (aged 82) Savitaipale, Finland
- Height: 162 cm (5 ft 4 in)
- Weight: 52–54 kg (115–119 lb)

Sport
- Sport: Cross-country skiing
- Club: Lemin Eskot
Medal record
Representing Finland
Olympic Games
Gold medal – first place	1956 Cortina d'Ampezzo	3 × 5 km relay
Silver medal – second place	1952 Oslo	10 km
World Championships
Silver medal – second place	1954 Falun	3 × 5 km relay
Bronze medal – third place	1954 Falun	10 km

Mirja Kyllikki Hietamies-Eteläpää (7 January 1931 – 14 March 2013) was a cross-country skier from Finland who competed at the 1952 and 1956 Winter Olympics. She won a gold medal in the 3 × 5 km relay in 1956 and a silver medal in the individual 10 km race in 1952, placing sixth in 1956. She also won two medals at the 1954 FIS Nordic World Ski Championships with a silver in the 3 × 5 km relay and a bronze in the 10 km.

Hietamies placed second over 10 km at Holmenkollen in 1951. Later she won this event at the Finnish championships in 1953 and 1956 and at the Lahti Ski Games in 1954 and 1955. In 1955 she was selected as Finland's female athlete of the year.

Hietamies retired after the 1956 Olympics and the same year married Olli Eteläpää. She later worked as a skiing coach and physical education teacher, and was a board member of the Finnish Skiing Federation from 1965 to 1967.

== Cross-country skiing results ==
All results are sourced from the International Ski Federation (FIS).

=== Olympic Games ===
- 2 medals – (1 gold, 1 silver)

Year	Age	10 km	3 × 5 km relay
1952	21	Silver	—N/a
1956	25	6	Gold

=== World Championships ===
- 2 medals – (1 silver, 1 bronze)

Year	Age	10 km	3 × 5 km relay
1954	23	Bronze	Silver

Awards
Preceded by (Finland) Siiri Rantanen	Finnish Sportswoman of the Year; 1955	Succeeded by (Finland) Siiri Rantanen
