= Magdolna Bartha =

Hungarian cross-country skier (1929–2004)

Personal information
- Nationality: Hungarian
- Born: 20 December 1929; Budapest, Hungary
- Died: 14 October 2004 (aged 74); Budapest, Hungary

Sport
- Sport: Cross-country skiing

Magdolna Bartha (20 December 1929 – 14 October 2004) was a Hungarian cross-country skier. She competed in the women's 10 kilometres at the 1960 Winter Olympics, at Squaw Valley in California, finishing in 23rd place.
