= Allan Andersson =

Swedish cross-country skier

Personal information
- Nationality: Swedish
- Born: 4 March 1931 Offerdal, Sweden
- Died: 10 May 2010 (aged 79) Idre, Sweden

Sport
- Sport: Cross-country skiing

Allan Andersson (4 March 1931 – 10 May 2010) was a Swedish cross-country skier. He competed in the men's 30 kilometre event at the 1960 Winter Olympics.

== Cross-country skiing results ==
=== Olympic Games ===
Year	Age	15 km	30 km	50 km	4 × 10 km relay
1960	28	—	13	—	—

=== World Championships ===
Year	Age	15 km	30 km	50 km	4 × 10 km relay
1958	26	25	—	—	—
