= Cross-country skiing at the 1960 Winter Olympics – Women's 3 × 5 kilometre relay =

Cross-country skiing at the Olympics

Women's 3 × 5 kilometre relay at the VIII Olympic Winter Games
- Cross-country skiing
- Venue: McKinney Creek Stadium
- Date: February 26, 1960
- Competitors: 15 from 5 nations
- Winning time: 1:04:21.4

Medalists
| 1st place, gold medalist(s) | | Irma Johansson; Britt Strandberg; Sonja Ruthström-Edström | Sweden |
| 2nd place, silver medalist(s) | | Radia Yeroshina; Maria Gusakova; Lyubov Kozyreva | Soviet Union |
| 3rd place, bronze medalist(s) | | Siiri Rantanen; Eeva Ruoppa; Toini Pöysti | Finland |

The women's 3 × 5 kilometre relay cross-country skiing event was part of the cross-country skiing programme at the 1960 Winter Olympics, held in Squaw Valley, California, United States. This event marked its second appearance. The competition took place on Friday, February 26, 1960, at McKinney Creek Stadium.

In a surprising turn of events, Sweden won the gold medal ahead, defeating the Soviet Union, which had secured the top four places in the individual event. Bulgaria was scheduled to compete but did not start the race.

== Results ==
| Rank | Nation | Skiers | Time |
|---|---|---|---|
| 1 | Sweden | Irma Johansson (21:31); Britt Strandberg (21:45); Sonja Ruthström-Edström (21:05.4) | 1:04:21.4 |
| 2 | Soviet Union | Radia Yeroshina (22:57); Maria Gusakova (21:18); Lyubov Kozyreva (20:47.6) | 1:05:02.6 |
| 3 | Finland | Siiri Rantanen (22:57); Eeva Ruoppa (21:51); Toini Pöysti (21:39.5) | 1:06:27.5 |
| 4 | Poland | Stefania Biegun (22:10); Helena Gąsienica Daniel (23:05); Józefa Czerniawska-Pęksa (22:09.6) | 1:07:24.6 |
| 5 | United Team of Germany | Rita Czech-Blasl (22:59); Renate Dannhauer-Borges (22:48); Sonnhilde Hausschild-Kallus (23:38.7) | 1:09:25.7 |
