= Janne Stefansson =

Swedish cross-country skier (born 1935)

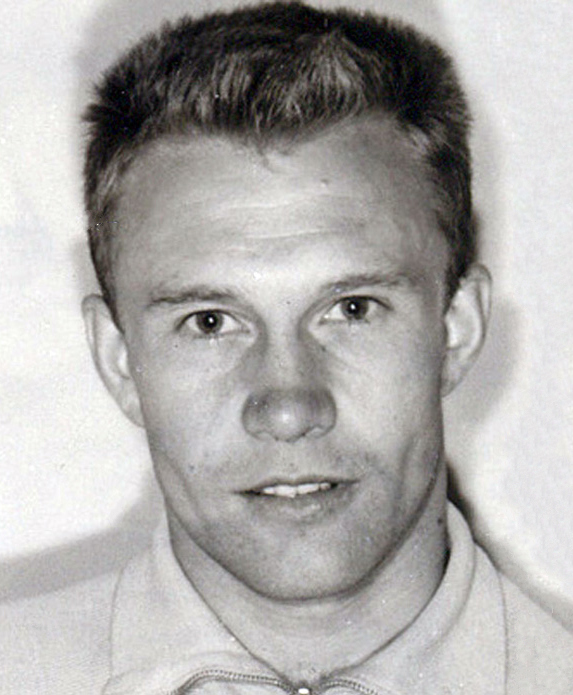
- Janne Stefansson by the early 1960s

Personal information
- Full name: Janne Reidar Stefansson
- Born: 19 March 1935 (age 91) Transtrand, Dalarna, Sweden
- Height: 170 cm (5 ft 7 in)
- Weight: 68 kg (150 lb)

Sport
- Sport: Cross-country skiing
- Club: Sälens IF
Medal record
Men's cross-country skiing
Representing Sweden
Olympic Games
Gold medal – first place	1964 Innsbruck	4×10 km
World Championships
Silver medal – second place	1962 Zakopane	30 km

Janne Reidar Stefansson (born 19 March 1935) is a retired Swedish cross-country skier. He competed in the 1960 and 1964 Olympics in the 15 km and 4 × 10 km events. He won a gold medal in the relay in 1964 and finishing fourth in 1960. He finished fifth in the 15 km event and fourth in both 30 km and 50 km events in 1964.

Stefansson won a silver medal over 30 km at the 1962 FIS Nordic World Ski Championships in Zakopane. He also won the long distance cross-country ski race Vasaloppet on seven occasions between 1962 and 1969, missing victory in 1967 when he finished second behind Assar Rönnlund. He was a forester by profession.

== Cross-country skiing results ==
All results are sourced from the International Ski Federation (FIS).

=== Olympic Games ===
- 1 medal – (1 gold)

Year	Age	15 km	30 km	50 km	4 × 10 km relay
1960	24	7	—	—	4
1964	28	5	4	4	Gold

=== World Championships ===
- 1 medal – (1 silver)

Year	Age	15 km	30 km	50 km	4 × 10 km relay
1958	22	—	11	—	—
1962	26	6	Silver	6	—
