= Einar Østby =

Norwegian cross-country skier (1935–2022)

Medal record

Men's cross-country skiing

Representing Norway

Olympic Games
Silver medal – second place	1960 Squaw Valley	4 × 10 km relay

World Championships
Bronze medal – third place	1962 Zakopane	15 km

Einar Østby (17 September 1935 – 3 April 2022) was a Norwegian cross-country skier who competed during the early 1960s. He earned a silver in the 4 × 10 km relay at the 1960 Winter Olympics in Squaw Valley and also finished fifth in the 15 km event as well. Østby also won a bronze medal in the 15 km event at the 1962 Nordic skiing World Championships.

Østby was born in Vinger on 17 September 1935. He was also an able long distance runner. His personal best times were 14:46.2 minutes in the 5000 metres, achieved in July 1959 at Bislett stadion, and 31:01.2 minutes in the 10,000 metres, achieved in August 1962 in Drammen. He represented the club Jaren IL.

Østby died on 3 April 2022, at the age of 86.

== Cross-country skiing results ==
All results are sourced from the International Ski Federation (FIS).

=== Olympic Games ===
- 1 medal – (1 silver)

Year	Age	15 km	30 km	50 km	4 × 10 km relay
1960	24	4	—	—	Silver
1964	28	15	8	7	4

=== World Championships ===
- 1 medal – (1 bronze)

Year	Age	15 km	30 km	50 km	4 × 10 km relay
1962	26	Bronze	5	—	4
