= Cross-country skiing at the 1956 Winter Olympics – Women's 3 × 5 kilometre relay =

The ladies' 3 × 5 kilometre cross-country relay at the 1956 Winter Olympics was held on 1 February. It was held at the Snow Stadium (Lo Stadio della neve), which was about 2 km (1.2 mi) from Cortina. Ten teams and thirty skiers participated in the event. Finland won the event. The Soviet team placed second and Sweden took the bronze.

== Medalists ==
Medal	Team	Time
Gold	Finland (Siiri Rantanen, Mirja Hietamies, Sirkka Polkunen)	1:04:21.4
Silver	Soviet Union (Radia Yeroshina, Alevtina Kolchina, Lyubov Kozyreva)	1:05:02.6
Bronze	Sweden (Sonja Ruthström-Edström, Irma Johansson, Anna-Lisa Eriksson)	1:06:27.5

== Results ==
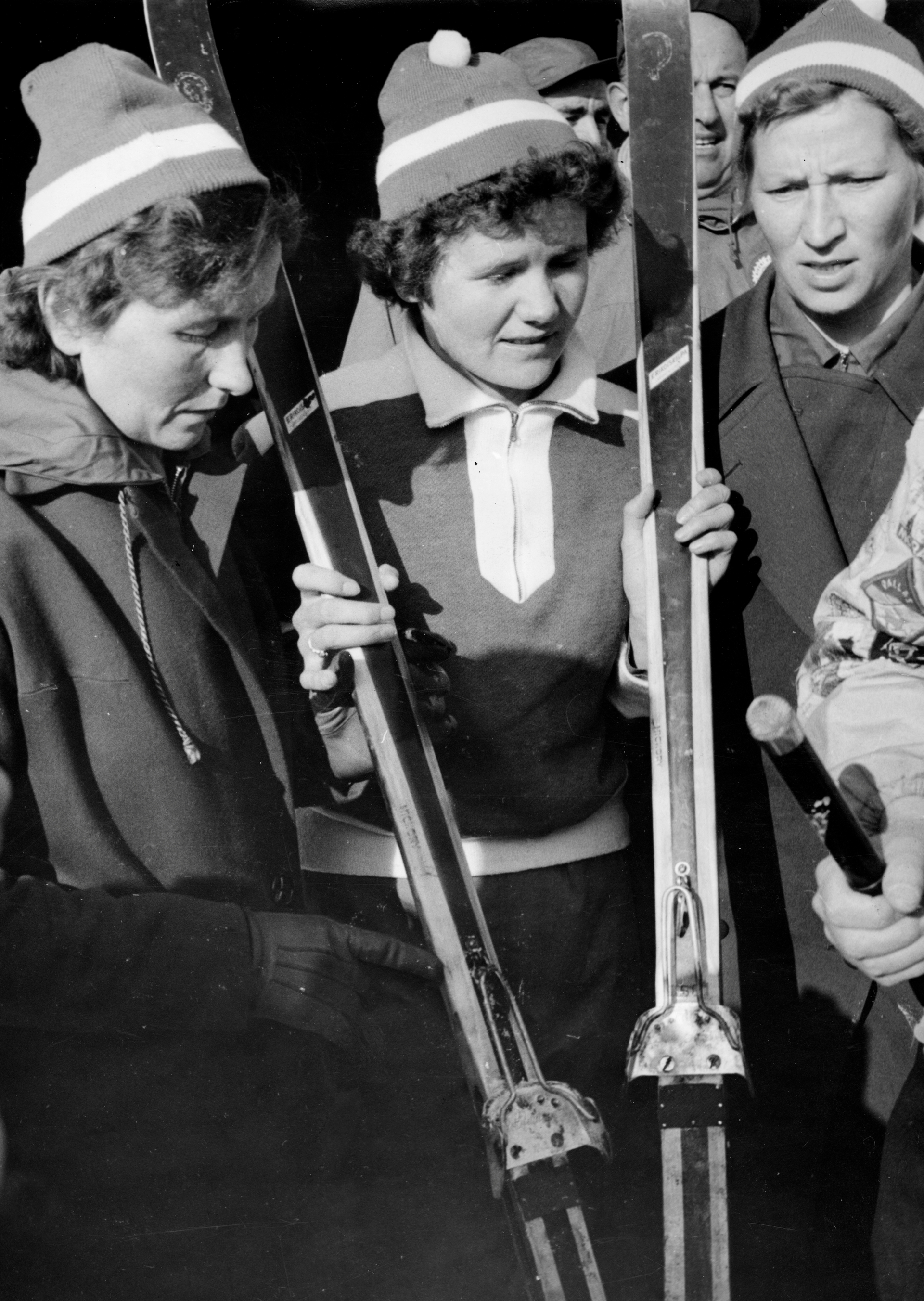
Sirkka Polkunen, Mirja Hietamies and Siiri Rantanen, winners of 3 x 5 km relay

Rank	Bib	Country	Time	Deficit*
1	3	Finland; Siiri Rantanen; Mirja Hietamies; Sirkka Polkunen	1:09.01; 23:22; 22:20; 23:19	0.0
2	5	Soviet Union; Radia Yeroshina; Alevtina Kolchina; Lyubov Kozyreva	1:09.28; 22:58; 22:38; 23:52	+27.0
3	8	Sweden; Sonja Ruthström-Edström; Irma Johansson; Anna-Lisa Eriksson	1:09.48; 24:10; 23:36; 22:02	+47.0
4	7	Norway; Kjelfrid Brusveen; Gina Regland; Rakel Wahl	1:10.50; 23:42; 24:03; 23:05	+1:49
5	9	Poland; Maria Bukova-Gasienica; Josefa Peksa; Zofia Krzeptowska	1:13.20; 24:30; 24:10; 24:40	+4.19
6	1	Czechoslovakia; Eva Benesova; Libuse Patockova; Eva Lauermannova	1:14.19; 26:23; 24:05; 23:51	+5.18
7	10	United Team of Germany; Elfriede Uhlig; Else Ammann; Sonnhilde Hausschild	1:15.33; 25:11; 25:11; 25:11	+6.32
8	2	Italy; Fides Romanin; Rita Bottero; Ildegarda Taffra	1:16.11; 25:44; 25:23; 25:04	+7.10
9	4	Yugoslavia; Amalija Belaj; Blazenka Vodenlic; Nada Kustec	1:18.54; 26:38; 26:39; 25:37	+9.53
10	6	Romania; Iuliana Simon; Ștefania Botcariu; Elena Zangor	DQ	

* Difference is in minutes and seconds.

== See also ==
- List of IOC country codes
- 1956 Winter Olympics
