= Ole Henrik Fagerås =

Norwegian Nordic combined skier

Medal record

Men's Nordic combined

World Championships
Bronze medal – third place	1962 Zakopane	Individual

Ole Henrik Fagerås (born 20 August 1939) is a Norwegian Nordic combined skier who competed in the early 1960s. He won a bronze medal in the individual event at the 1962 FIS Nordic World Ski Championships in Zakopane.

Fagerås also won the Nordic combined event at the 1962 Holmenkollen ski festival.
