= Olle Dahlberg =

Swedish speed skater

Sven Olof Wilhelm "Olle" "Sheriffen" Dahlberg (4 October 1928 – 13 May 1997) was a Swedish speed skater who competed in the 1956 Winter Olympics and in the 1960 Winter Olympics.

He was born in Sollefteå and died in Sundsvall.

In 1956 he finished seventh in the 5000 metres event and eighth in the 10000 metres competition.

Four years later he finished seventh in the 10000 metres contest, 13th in the 5000 metres event, 18th in the 1500 metres competition and 30th in the 500 metres contest at the 1960 Games.
