= Gunnar Sjölin =

Swedish speed skater

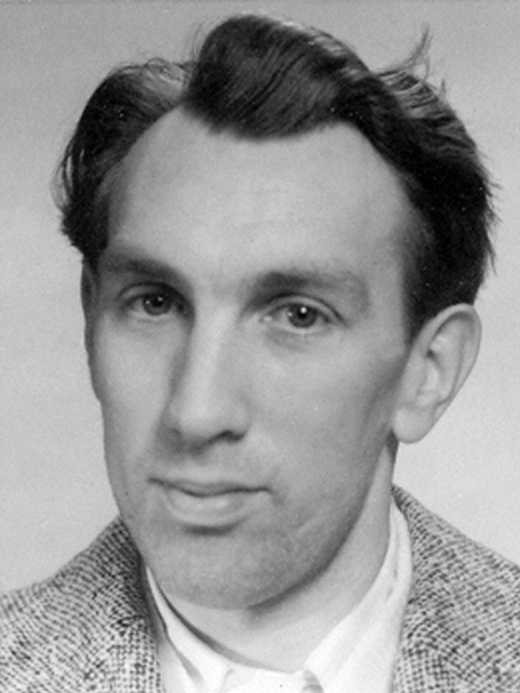

Personal information
- Born: 9 March 1924 Sandarne, Sweden
- Died: 20 July 2015 (aged 91) Söderhamn, Sweden

Sport
- Sport: Speed skating
- Club: Sandarne SoIF, Söderhamn; IK Wega, Göteborg

Achievements and titles
- Personal best(s): 500 m – 43.2 (1960); 1500 m – 2:11.8 (1960); 5000 m – 7:59.8 (1960); 10000 m – 17:15.4 (1957)

Gunnar Enock Sjölin (9 March 1924 – 20 July 2015) was a Swedish speed skater. He competed at the 1956 and 1960 Winter Olympics with the best result of 12th place in the 5000 m in 1956.
