= Toini Pöysti =

Finnish cross-country skier (1933–2024

Medal record

Women's cross-country skiing

Representing Finland

Olympic Games
| Bronze medal – third place | 1960 Squaw Valley | 3 × 5 km relay |
| Bronze medal – third place | 1964 Innsbruck | 3 × 5 km relay |

World Championships
| Silver medal – second place | 1958 Lahti | 3 × 5 km relay |

Toini Pöysti (1 July 1933 – 9 May 2024), sometimes shown as Toini Mikkola or Toini Mikkola-Pöysti, was a Finnish cross-country skier who competed during the 1950s and early 1960s. She won two bronze medals in the Winter Olympics in the 3 × 5 km relay (1960, 1964).

== Biography ==
Pöysti was born in Ahlainen on 1 July 1933. She was the first woman to win at the Holmenkollen ski festival in 1954 when she won the 10 km event (as Toni Mikkola). She also won a silver medal in the 3 × 5 km relay at the 1958 FIS Nordic World Ski Championships in Lahti. She died on 9 May 2024, at the age of 90.

== Cross-country skiing results ==
All results are sourced from the International Ski Federation (FIS).

=== Olympic Games ===
- 2 medals – (2 bronze)

| Year | Age | 5 km | 10 km | 3 × 5 km relay |
|---|---|---|---|---|
| 1960 | 26 | —N/a | 6 | Bronze |
| 1964 | 30 | 5 | 5 | Bronze |

=== World Championships ===
- 1 medal – (1 silver)

| Year | Age | 5 km | 10 km | 3 × 5 km relay |
|---|---|---|---|---|
| 1958 | 24 | —N/a | 7 | Silver |
| 1966 | 32 | 9 | — | 5 |
