= Väinö Huhtala =

Finnish cross-country skier

Personal information
- Full name: Väinö Veikko Sakari Huhtala
- Born: 24 December 1935 Revonlahti, Finland
- Died: 18 June 2016 (aged 80) Jämsä, Finland
- Height: 165 cm (5 ft 5 in)

Sport
- Sport: Skiing
- Club: Revonlahden Reipas; Jämsänkosken Ilves
Medal record
Men's cross-country skiing
Representing Finland
Olympic Games
Gold medal – first place	1960 Squaw Valley	4 × 10 km relay
Silver medal – second place	1964 Innsbruck	4 × 10 km relay
World Championships
Silver medal – second place	1962 Zakopane	4 × 10 km relay

Väinö Veikko Sakari Huhtala (24 December 1935 – 18 June 2016) was a Finnish cross-country skier who competed in the early 1960s. He won two medals in the 4 × 10 km relay at the Winter Olympics with a gold in 1960 and a silver in 1964. Huhtala also finished fourth in the 15 km event at the 1964 Winter Olympics in Innsbruck.

He also won a silver medal in the 1962 FIS Nordic World Ski Championships in the 4 × 10 km relay.

== Cross-country skiing results ==
All results are sourced from the International Ski Federation (FIS).

=== Olympic Games ===
- 2 medals – (1 gold, 1 silver)

Year	Age	15 km	30 km	50 km	4 × 10 km relay
1960	24	13	—	—	Gold
1964	28	4	14	—	Silver

=== World Championships ===
- 1 medal – (1 silver)

Year	Age	15 km	30 km	50 km	4 × 10 km relay
1962	26	—	—	—	Silver
