= Elena Zangor =

Romanian cross-country skier (born 1933)

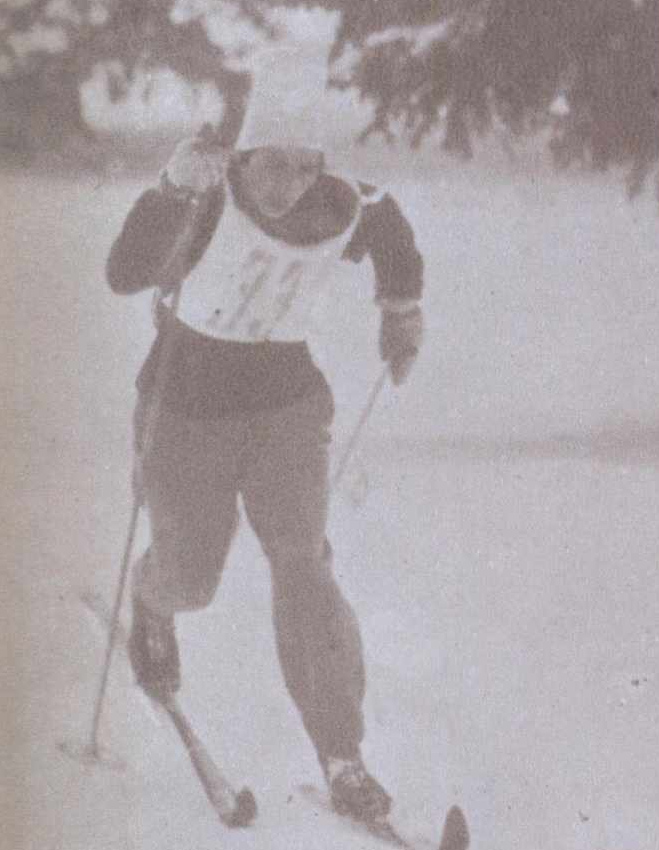

Personal information
- Nationality: Romanian
- Born: 19 June 1933 Azuga, Kingdom of Romania

Sport
- Sport: Cross-country skiing

Elena Zangor (born 19 June 1933) is a Romanian cross-country skier. She competed in the women's 3 × 5 kilometre relay at the 1956 Winter Olympics.
