= Pentti Pesonen =

Finnish cross-country skier (1938–2024)

Medal record

Men's cross-country skiing

Representing Finland

World Championships
| Silver medal – second place | 1962 Zakopane | 4 × 10 km relay |

Pentti Pesonen (7 April 1938 – 22 February 2024) was a Finnish cross-country skier who competed in the early 1960s. He earned a silver medal in the 4 × 10 km relay at the 1962 FIS Nordic World Ski Championships in Zakopane. Pesonen died on 22 February 2024, at the age of 85.

== Cross-country skiing results ==
=== World Championships ===
- 1 medals – (1 silver)

| Year | Age | 15 km | 30 km | 50 km | 4 × 10 km relay |
|---|---|---|---|---|---|
| 1962 | 23 | — | — | — | Silver |

== Sources ==
Arponen, Antti O.; Hannus, Matti; Honkavaara, Aarne; Leinonen, Kimmo; Mäki-Kuutti, Tarmo; Raatikainen, Voitto ;& Raevuori, Antero: Talviurheilun tähdet, s. 89. WSOY, 1986. ISBN 951-0-13095-8. (Finnish)
