= Per-Olof Brogren =

Swedish speed skater

Personal information
- Nationality: Swedish
- Born: 17 April 1939 (age 85); Gothenburg, Sweden

Sport
- Sport: Speed skating

Per-Olof Brogren (born 17 April 1939) is a Swedish speed skater. He competed in two events at the 1960 Winter Olympics.
