= Eeva Ruoppa =

Finnish cross-country skier (1932–2013)

Medal record

Women's cross-country skiing

Representing Finland

Olympic Games
Bronze medal – third place	1960 Squaw Valley	3 × 5 km relay

World Championships
Bronze medal – third place	1962 Zakopane	3 × 5 km relay

Eeva Ruoppa (2 May 1932 Miehikkälä – 27 April 2013 Miehikkälä) was a cross-country skier from Finland who competed during the early 1960s. She won a bronze medal in the 3 × 5 km relay at the 1960 Winter Olympics in Squaw Valley.

Ruoppa also won a bronze medal in the 3 × 5 km relay at the 1962 FIS Nordic World Ski Championships in Zakopane.

She was a farmer.

== Cross--country skiing results ==
=== Olympic Games ===
- 1 medal – (1 bronze)

Year	Age	5 km	10 km	3 × 5 km relay
1960	28	—N/a	11	Bronze
1964	32	8	9	—

=== World Championships ===
- 1 medal – (1 bronze)

Year	Age	5 km	10 km	3 × 5 km relay
1962	30	—	—	Bronze
1966	34	—	—	5
