= Lars Olsson (cross-country skier) =

Swedish cross-country skier (born 1932)

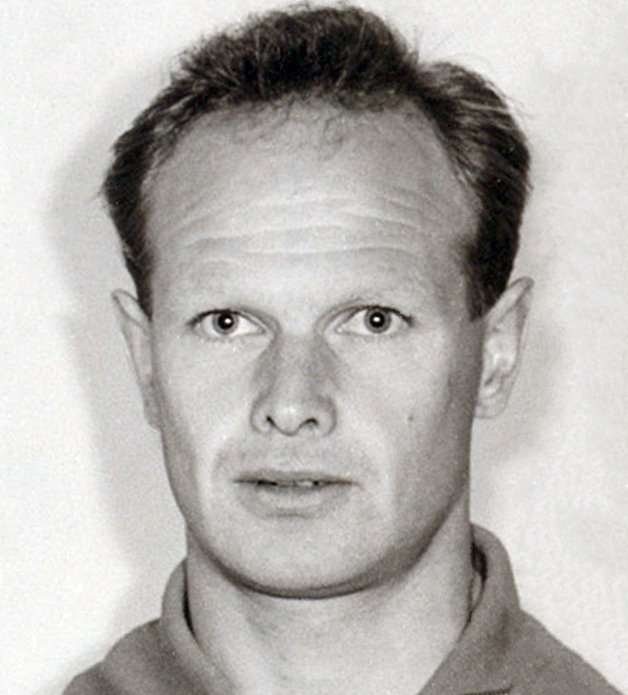

Personal information
- Full name: Lars Sune Olsson
- Born: 13 October 1932 (age 93) Bograngen, Torsby, Sweden

Sport
- Sport: Cross-country skiing
- Club: Finnskoga IF, Sysslebäck
Medal record
Men's cross-country skiing
Representing Sweden
World Championships
Gold medal – first place	1962 Zakopane	4 × 10 km relay

Lars Sune Olsson (born 13 October 1932) is a retired Swedish cross-country skier. He was part of the Swedish 4 × 10 km relay team that won the 1962 world title and finished fourth at the 1960 Olympics; individually he placed 16th over 15 km at the 1964 Games.

== Cross-country skiing results ==
=== Olympic Games ===
Year	Age	15 km	30 km	50 km	4 × 10 km relay
1960	27	—	—	—	4
1964	31	16	—	—	—

=== World Championships ===
- 1 medal – (1 gold)

Year	Age	15 km	30 km	50 km	4 × 10 km relay
1962	29	—	—	—	Gold
