= Elsa Einarsson =

Swedish speed skater

Personal information
- Nationality: Swedish
- Born: 27 July 1941 (age 83); Strömsund, Sweden

Sport
- Sport: Speed skating

Elsa Einarsson (born 27 July 1941) is a Swedish speed skater. She competed in four events at the 1960 Winter Olympics.
