= Tormod Knutsen =

Norwegian skier (1932–2021)

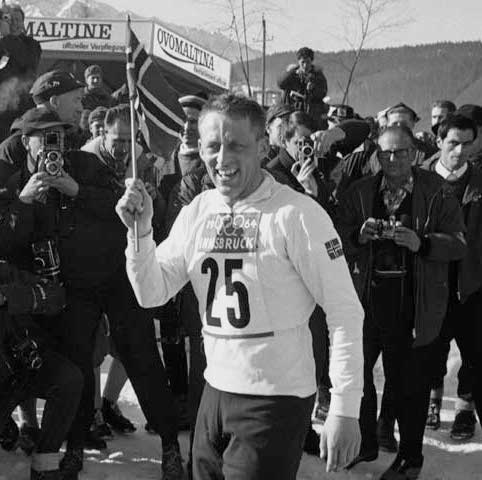
- Knutsen at the 1964 Olympics

Personal information
- Born: 7 January 1932 Eidsvoll, Norway
- Died: 23 February 2021 (aged 89) Eidsvoll

Sport
- Sport: Nordic combined
- Club: Eidsvold Værk SK
- Retired: 1964

Achievements and titles
- Olympic finals: 1956, 1960, 1964
- World finals: 1958, 1962
- National finals: 1959, 1960, 1963, 1964
Medal record
Representing Norway
Olympic Games
Silver medal – second place	1960 Squaw Valley	Individual
Gold medal – first place	1964 Innsbruck	Individual

Tormod Kåre Knutsen (7 January 1932 – 23 February 2021) was a Norwegian Nordic combined skier, who won the Nordic combined event at the 1964 Winter Olympics, and came second at the 1960 Winter Olympics. He won four national championships, and in 1960, he received the Norwegian Holmenkollen Medal.

== Sports career ==
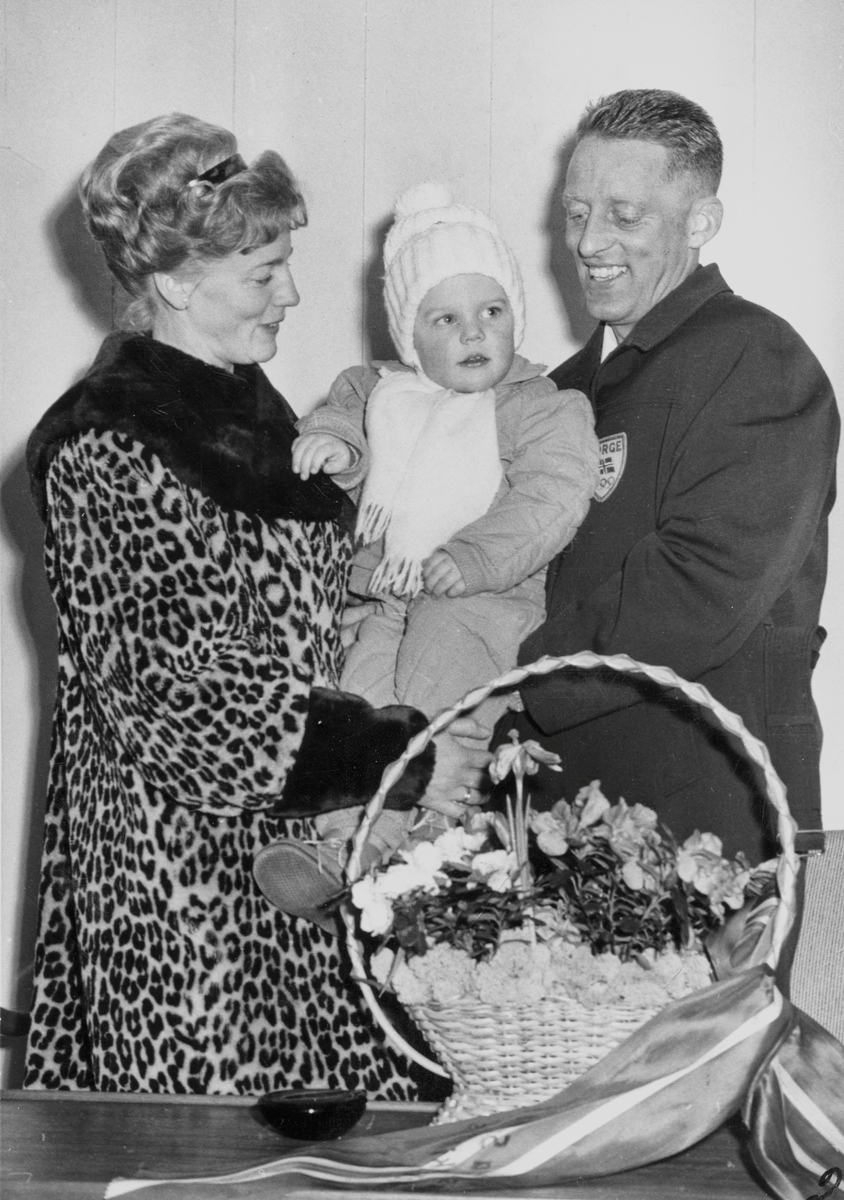
Olga, Audun and Tormod Knutsen in 1964

Knutsen started as a ski jumper, winning the national junior titles in 1949 and 1951. He failed to qualify for the 1952 Winter Olympics in Oslo, after which he considered taking up Nordic combined skiing. Whilst completing military service, he met Nordic combined skiers Gunder Gundersen and Sverre Stenersen, who encouraged him to take up the event. Knutsen won a bronze medal in the Nordic combined event at the 1955 national championships. He was selected for the 1956 Winter Olympics as a substitute, and was included to the main team two days before the event due to an injury of Gunder Gundersen; Knutsen placed sixth. He was the third best placed Norwegian in the event, behind Stenersen and Arne Barhaugen.

In 1958, Knutsen won Nordic combined in the Holmenkollen Ski Festival; he was the only Norwegian to win an event. That year, he also came 9th at the FIS Nordic World Ski Championships 1958. He won the national titles in 1959 and 1960. In 1960, he also placed second in ski jumping at the national championships. He was a favourite for the Nordic combined event at the 1960 Winter Olympics, and finished second to Georg Thoma. After placing fourth at the FIS Nordic World Ski Championships 1962, he won the national title in 1963 and 1964. Knutsen won a gold medal in the Nordic combined event at the 1964 Winter Olympics in Innsbruck, Austria. He had been in second place, behind Thoma, after the ski jumping phase of the event. It was Norway's first gold medal of the Games. Later in the year, Knutsen finished sixth at the Holmenkollen Ski Festival, and he retired at the end of the 1964 season. In 1964, he wrote an autobiography I hopp og løype (In jumps and trails).

== Awards ==
Knutsen received the Holmenkollen Medal in 1960, shared with Helmut Recknagel, Sixten Jernberg and Sverre Stensheim.

== Personal life ==
Knutsen was born in Eidsvoll on 7 January 1932. He represented the club Eidsvold Værks Skiklub.

He died in Eidsvoll on 23 February 2021. His death was announced by his son Audun Knutsen.

== Nordic combined results ==
Results are sourced from the International Ski Federation (FIS), unless indicated otherwise.

=== Olympic Games ===
Year	Normal hill
1956	6
1960	Silver
1964	Gold

=== World Championship ===
Year	Individual K90/15 km
1958	9
1962	4
