= Andrzej Krzeptowski =

Andrzej Krzeptowski may refer to:

- Andrzej Krzeptowski (born 1902), Olympic cross-country skier at the 1928 Winter Olympics for Poland
- Andrzej Krzeptowski (born 1903), Olympic competitor at the 1924 Winter Olympics and at the 1928 Winter Olympics for Poland
