= Zofia Krzeptowska =

Polish cross-country skier

Personal information
- Full name: Zofia Krzeptowska-Gąsienica-Bukowa
- Nationality: Polish
- Born: 8 June 1934 (age 91) Zakopane, Poland
- Height: 165 cm (5 ft 5 in)
- Relative: Anna Krzeptowska-Żebracka (sister)

Sport
- Sport: Cross-country skiing

Zofia Krzeptowska (born 8 June 1934) is a Polish cross-country skier. She competed in the women's 10 kilometres and the women's 3 × 5 km relay events at the 1956 Winter Olympics. She is the sister of Anna Krzeptowska-Żebracka.

== Cross-country skiing results ==
=== Olympic Games ===
Year	Age	10 km	3 × 5 km relay
1956	21	18	5

=== World Championships ===
Year	Age	10 km	3 × 5 km relay
1958	23	26	—
