= Dmitry Kochkin =

Soviet Nordic combined skier

Medal record

Men's Nordic combined

Representing Soviet Union

World Championships
Silver medal – second place	1962 Zakopane	Individual

Dmitry Kochkin (Russian: Дми́трий Ко́чкин; born 25 April 1934 in Kirov) was a former Soviet Nordic combined skier who competed in the early 1960s. He won the silver in the individual event at the 1962 FIS Nordic World Ski Championships in Zakopane.

Kochkin also finished 5th in the individual event at the 1960 Winter Olympics in Squaw Valley.
