= Tahoma, California =

Tahoma
- census-designated place
- Location within California
- Coordinates: 39°03′47″N 120°07′58″W
- Country: United States
- State: California
- Counties: Placer, El Dorado

Area
  - Total: 2.593 sq mi (6.717 km^{2})
  - Land: 2.593 sq mi (6.717 km^{2})
  - Water: 0 sq mi (0 km^{2})
- Elevation: 6,339 ft (1,932 m)

Population (2020)
  - Total: 1,034
  - Density: 398.7/sq mi (153.9/km^{2})
- Time zone: UTC-8 (Pacific (PST))
  - Summer (DST): UTC-7 (PDT)
- ZIP code: 96142
- Area code: 530
- GNIS feature ID: 2628793

Tahoma (formerly Chambers Lodge) is a census-designated place in Placer and El Dorado counties, California, United States. Tahoma is located along Lake Tahoe 2 miles (3.2 km) southeast of Homewood. As of the 2020 census, Tahoma had a population of 1,034.

Tahoma has a post office with ZIP code 96142, which opened in 1946.

== History ==
Tahoma started as a resort in 1916. The place name was created from combining "Tahoe" and "home".

During the 1960 Winter Olympics in nearby Squaw Valley, Tahoma was selected as the site of the cross-country skiing and biathlon, as there was insufficient space in Squaw Valley. The temporary McKinney Creek Stadium was built for the game and demolished afterwards.

== Geography ==
According to the United States Census Bureau, the CDP covers an area of 2.6 square miles (6.7 km^{2}), all land.

=== Climate ===
Climate data for Tahoma, California, 1991–2020 normals, extremes 2011–present
Month	Jan	Feb	Mar	Apr	May	Jun	Jul	Aug	Sep	Oct	Nov	Dec	Year
Record high °F (°C)	54 (12)	57 (14)	64 (18)	70 (21)	76 (24)	89 (32)	90 (32)	91 (33)	92 (33)	77 (25)	63 (17)	56 (13)	92 (33)
Mean daily maximum °F (°C)	37.4 (3.0)	38.0 (3.3)	42.9 (6.1)	48.7 (9.3)	57.8 (14.3)	68.6 (20.3)	77.1 (25.1)	76.3 (24.6)	69.4 (20.8)	57.7 (14.3)	44.5 (6.9)	37.6 (3.1)	54.7 (12.6)
Daily mean °F (°C)	29.7 (−1.3)	29.8 (−1.2)	33.8 (1.0)	38.0 (3.3)	45.7 (7.6)	54.5 (12.5)	61.5 (16.4)	61.0 (16.1)	55.4 (13.0)	45.7 (7.6)	35.8 (2.1)	29.4 (−1.4)	43.4 (6.3)
Mean daily minimum °F (°C)	22.0 (−5.6)	21.5 (−5.8)	24.7 (−4.1)	27.2 (−2.7)	33.6 (0.9)	40.3 (4.6)	45.6 (7.6)	45.6 (7.6)	41.3 (5.2)	33.7 (0.9)	27.0 (−2.8)	21.1 (−6.1)	32.0 (0.0)
Record low °F (°C)	−2 (−19)	1 (−17)	7 (−14)	11 (−12)	16 (−9)	27 (−3)	34 (1)	38 (3)	28 (−2)	17 (−8)	8 (−13)	−2 (−19)	−2 (−19)
Average precipitation inches (mm)	6.37 (162)	6.90 (175)	5.52 (140)	2.78 (71)	2.02 (51)	0.84 (21)	0.49 (12)	0.35 (8.9)	0.60 (15)	1.99 (51)	3.40 (86)	6.47 (164)	37.73 (956.9)
Average snowfall inches (cm)	38.4 (98)	46.8 (119)	49.6 (126)	13.9 (35)	4.8 (12)	0.4 (1.0)	0.3 (0.76)	0.0 (0.0)	0.2 (0.51)	3.8 (9.7)	12.4 (31)	33.1 (84)	203.7 (516.97)
Average precipitation days (≥ 0.01 in)	9.8	8.5	11.1	8.0	8.5	3.0	1.8	1.8	3.4	3.9	8.2	10.0	78
Average snowy days (≥ 0.1 in)	7.2	7.3	9.8	4.3	1.8	0.3	0.1	0.0	0.3	1.0	3.9	7.0	43.0
Source 1: NOAA
Source 2: XMACIS2 (precip days, snow/snow days 2011–2020)

== Demographics ==
Historical population
Census	Pop.	Note	%±
2010	1,191		—
2020	1,034		−13.2%
U.S. Decennial Census; 2010

=== 2020 census ===
As of the 2020 census, Tahoma had a population of 1,034. The population density was 398.6 inhabitants per square mile (153.9/km^{2}). 100.0% of residents lived in urban areas, while 0.0% lived in rural areas.

The age distribution was 157 people (15.2%) under the age of 18, 47 people (4.5%) aged 18 to 24, 240 people (23.2%) aged 25 to 44, 391 people (37.8%) aged 45 to 64, and 199 people (19.2%) who were 65 years of age or older. The median age was 49.8 years. For every 100 females, there were 115.9 males, and for every 100 females age 18 and over, there were 120.4 males age 18 and over.

The whole population lived in households. There were 493 households, out of which 118 (23.9%) had children under the age of 18 living in them, 211 (42.8%) were married-couple households, 53 (10.8%) were cohabiting couple households, 95 (19.3%) had a female householder with no spouse or partner present, and 134 (27.2%) had a male householder with no spouse or partner present. 151 households (30.6%) were one person, and 58 (11.8%) were one person aged 65 or older. The average household size was 2.1. There were 290 families (58.8% of all households).

There were 2,132 housing units at an average density of 821.9 units per square mile (317.3 units/km^{2}), of which 493 (23.1%) were occupied and 76.9% were vacant. Of the occupied units, 312 (63.3%) were owner-occupied, and 181 (36.7%) were occupied by renters. The homeowner vacancy rate was 1.8% and the rental vacancy rate was 15.1%.

Racial composition as of the 2020 census
Race	Number	Percent
White	908	87.8%
Black or African American	4	0.4%
American Indian and Alaska Native	1	0.1%
Asian	7	0.7%
Native Hawaiian and Other Pacific Islander	2	0.2%
Some other race	19	1.8%
Two or more races	93	9.0%
Hispanic or Latino (of any race)	54	5.2%

=== 2010 census ===
Tahoma first appeared as a census designated place in the 2010 U.S. census.

== Education ==
All portions in both counties are served by the Tahoe-Truckee Unified School District.
