= Irma Johansson =

Swedish cross-country skier (born 1932)

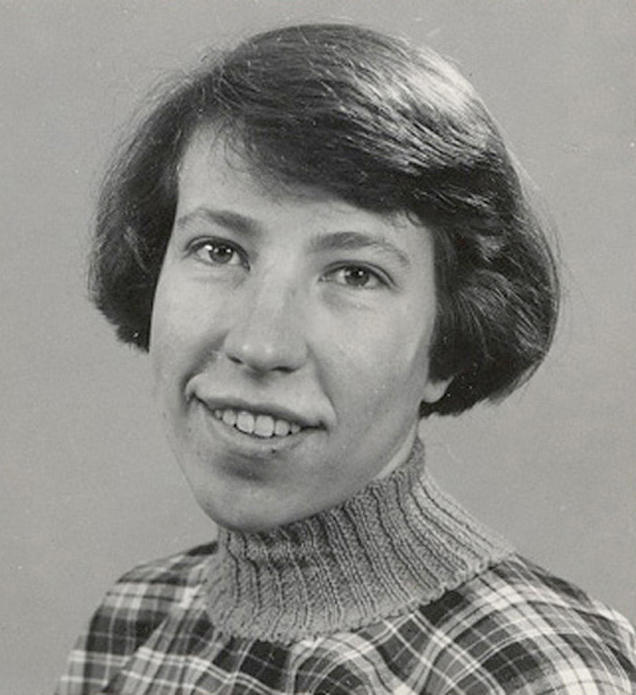

Personal information
- Born: Irma Elina Johansson; 3 April 1932 (age 94) Kalix, Sweden

Sport
- Sport: Cross-country skiing
- Club: IFK Kalix; Luleå SK
Medal record
Women's cross-country skiing
Representing Sweden
Event	1st	2nd	3rd
Olympic Games	1	0	1
World Championships	0	1	0
Total	1	1	1
Olympic Games
Gold medal – first place	1960 Squaw Valley	3 × 5 km relay
Bronze medal – third place	1956 Cortina d'Ampezzo	3 × 5 km relay
World Championships
Bronze medal – third place	1958 Lahti	3 × 5 km relay

Irma Elina Johansson (later Öberg, born 3 April 1932) is a former Swedish cross-country skier. She competed at the 1956 and 1960 Olympics in the 3 × 5 km relay and 10 km events and won two medals in the relay, with a gold in 1960 and a bronze in 1956. Individually she finished in 7–8th place.

Johansson also won a 3 × 5 relay km bronze medal at the 1958 FIS Nordic World Ski Championships. She and her husband worked for three decades as gardeners in Skellefteå before moving back to her native Kalix.

== Cross-country skiing results ==
=== Olympic Games ===
- 2 medals – (1 gold, 1 bronze)

Year	Age	10 km	3 × 5 km relay
1956	23	7	Bronze
1960	27	8	Gold

=== World Championships ===
- 1 medal – (1 bronze)

Year	Age	10 km	3 × 5 km relay
1958	25	18	Bronze
