= Britt Strandberg =

Swedish cross-country skier

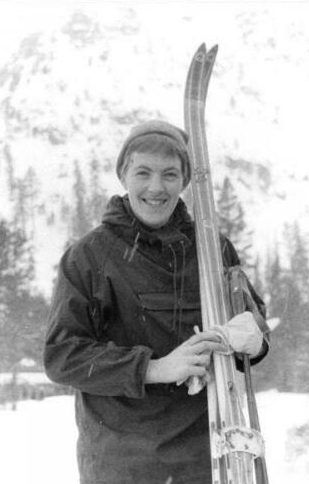
- Strandberg in the early 1960's

Personal information
- Born: Britt Marianne Strandberg; 31 March 1934 (age 92) Hennan, Sweden
- Height: 167 cm (5 ft 6 in)
- Weight: 60 kg (132 lb)

Sport
- Sport: Cross-country skiing
- Club: Edsbyns IF
Medal record
Representing Sweden
Event	1st	2nd	3rd
Olympic Games	1	2	0
World Championships	0	1	1
Total	1	3	1
Olympic Games
Gold medal – first place	1960 Squaw Valley	3 × 5 km relay
Silver medal – second place	1964 Innsbruck	3 × 5 km relay
Silver medal – second place	1968 Grenoble	3 × 5 km relay
World Championships
Silver medal – second place	1962 Zakopane	3 × 5 km relay
Bronze medal – third place	1966 Oslo	3 × 5 km relay

Britt Marianne Strandberg (later Lundén, born 31 March 1934) is a former Swedish cross-country skier. She competed at the 1960, 1964 and 1968 Winter Olympics in the 3 × 5 km relay and 5 and 10 km events. She won three medals in the relay with a gold in 1960 and silvers in 1964 and 1968. Her best individual result was fourth place over 10 km in 1964, only 7.4 seconds behind the bronze medal.

Strandberg also won 3 × 5 km relay medals at the FIS Nordic World Ski Championships with a silver in 1962 and a bronze in 1966.

== Cross-country skiing results ==
All results are sourced from the International Ski Federation (FIS).

=== Olympic Games ===
- 3 medals – (1 gold, 2 silver)

Year	Age	5 km	10 km	3 × 5 km relay
1960	25	—N/a	10	Gold
1964	29	11	4	Silver
1968	33	15	15	Silver

=== World Championships ===
- 2 medals – (1 silver, 1 bronze)

Year	Age	5 km	10 km	3 × 5 km relay
1962	27	—	—	Silver
1966	31	—	—	Bronze
