= Sonja Edström =

Swedish cross-country skier (1930–2020)

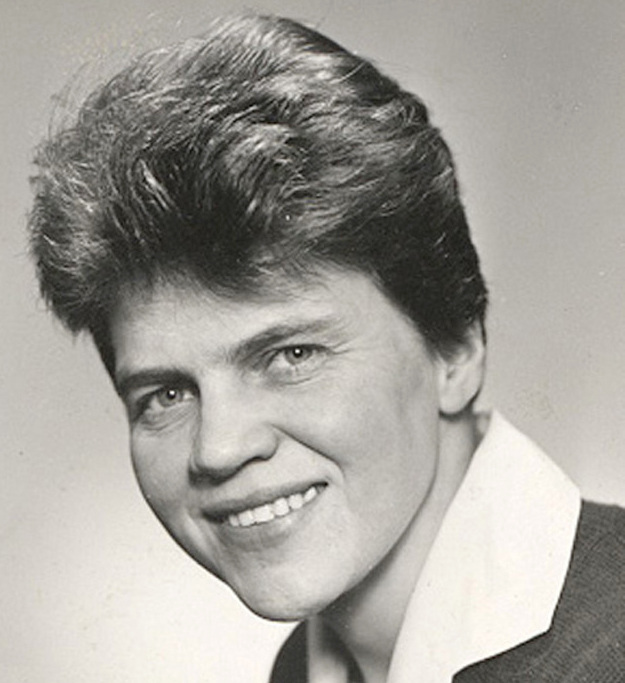

Personal information
- Born: 18 December 1930 Luleå, Sweden
- Died: 15 October 2020 (aged 89) Luleå, Sweden

Sport
- Sport: Cross-country skiing
- Club: Luleå SK
Medal record
Women's cross-country skiing
Representing Sweden
Event	1st	2nd	3rd
Olympic Games	1	0	2
World Championships	0	0	2
Total	1	0	4
Olympic Games
Gold medal – first place	1960 Squaw Valley	3 × 5 km relay
Bronze medal – third place	1956 Cortina d'Ampezzo	10 km
Bronze medal – third place	1956 Cortina d'Ampezzo	3 × 5 km relay
World Championships
Bronze medal – third place	1954 Falun	3 × 5 km relay
Bronze medal – third place	1958 Lahti	3 × 5 km relay

Sonja Viola Edström-Ruthström (Edström before 1960, 18 November 1930 – 15 October 2020) was a Swedish cross-country skier. She competed at the 1952, 1956, and 1960 Olympics in the 10 km and 3 × 5 km relay events and won bronze medals in both in 1956; in 1960 she finished fifth in the 10 km, but won the 3 × 5 km relay.

Edström also won two 3 × 5 km relay bronze medals at the FIS Nordic World Ski Championships in 1954 and 1958. She won the 10 km event at the Holmenkollen ski festival in 1956. In 1953–1960, she collected 12 individual and three relay national titles.

Edström was born in a family of six siblings, and was mostly raised by her father, as her mother fell seriously ill when Edström was six years old. At 14 she started working as a maid, and at 16 as a bottles cleaner at the Luleå Brewery. She was later a nurse at a Luleå hospital for more than 30 years.

== Cross-country skiing results ==
All results are sourced from the International Ski Federation (FIS).

=== Olympic Games ===
- 3 medals – (1 gold, 2 bronze)

Year	Age	10 km	3 × 5 km relay
1952	21	11	—N/a
1956	25	Bronze	Bronze
1960	29	5	Gold

=== World Championships ===
- 2 medals – (2 bronze)

Year	Age	10 km	3 × 5 km relay
1954	23	—	Bronze
1958	27	22	Bronze
