= Timoshkino =

Timoshkino Тимошкино
- Village
- Location within Vladimir Oblast Location within Russia
- Coordinates: 56°19′N 39°08′E
- Country: Russia
- Region: Vladimir Oblast
- District: Kolchuginsky District
- Time zone: UTC+3:00

Timoshkino (Russian: Тимошкино) is a rural locality (a village) in Florishchinskoye Rural Settlement, Kolchuginsky District, Vladimir Oblast, Russia. The population was 7 as of 2010.

== Geography ==
Timoshkino is located 27 km west of Kolchugino (the district's administrative centre) by road. Skomorokhovo is the nearest rural locality.
