= Siiri Rantanen =

Finnish cross-country skier (1924–2023)

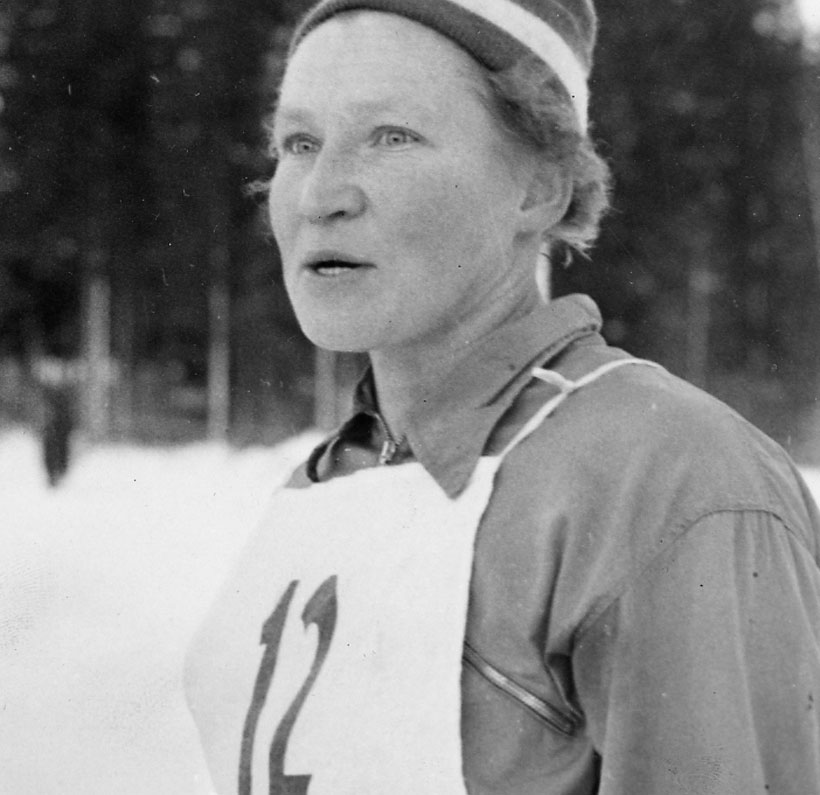
- Rantanen in the 1950s

Personal information
- Born: 14 December 1924 Tohmajärvi, North Karelia, Finland
- Died: 5 May 2023 (aged 98) Lahti, Päijät-Häme, Finland
- Height: 165 cm (5 ft 5 in)
- Weight: 56–58 kg (123–128 lb)

Sport
- Sport: Cross-country skiing
- Club: Joensuun Kataja; Lahden Hiihtoseura
Medal record
Women's cross-country skiing
Representing Finland
Olympic Games
Gold medal – first place	1956 Cortina d'Ampezzo	3 × 5 km relay
Bronze medal – third place	1952 Oslo	10 km
Bronze medal – third place	1960 Squaw Valley	3 × 5 km relay
World Championships
Silver medal – second place	1954 Falun	10 km
Silver medal – second place	1954 Falun	3 × 5 km relay
Silver medal – second place	1958 Lahti	3 × 5 km relay
Bronze medal – third place	1958 Lahti	10 km
Bronze medal – third place	1962 Zakopane	3 × 5 km relay

Siiri Johanna "Äitee" Rantanen (née Lintunen, 14 December 1924 – 5 May 2023) was a Finnish cross-country skier. She competed in the 1952, 1956, and 1960 Olympics and won a medal in each of them: a gold and a bronze in the 3 × 5 km relay in 1956–60 and another bronze in the individual 10 km in 1952; she placed fifth and 15th over 10 km in 1956 and 1960, respectively. She also won five medals at the FIS Nordic World Ski Championships.

Domestically Rantanen won six individual (10 km in 1954 and 1957–58; 5 km in 1960–1962) and five relay titles (1952, 1958–1961). Rantanen also won three Finnish titles in athletics: one individual in cross-country running in 1960 and two in 1961, in the 3 × 800 m relay and team cross-country; the same year she also became the Finnish champion in the 50 km cycling road race. She was selected as the Finnish female athlete of the year in 1954, 1956, 1958, and 1959. Rantanen worked as an upholsterer and continued competing in sports until her 80s.

Rantanen died in Lahti on 5 May 2023, at the age of 98.

== Cross-country skiing results ==
All results are sourced from the International Ski Federation (FIS).

=== Olympic Games ===
- 3 medals – (1 gold, 2 bronze)

Year	Age	10 km	3 × 5 km relay
1952	27	Bronze	—N/a
1956	31	5	Gold
1960	35	15	Bronze

=== World Championships ===
- 5 medals – (3 silver, 2 bronze)

Year	Age	5 km	10 km	3 × 5 km relay
1954	29	—N/a	Silver	Silver
1958	33	—N/a	Bronze	Silver
1962	37	4	—	Bronze
