= Rolf Rämgård =

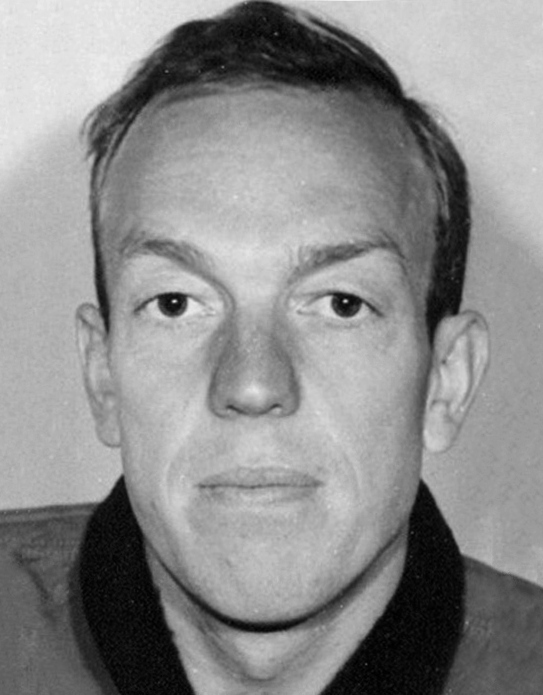
- Rolf Rämgård around 1960's

Personal information
- Born: 30 March 1934 (age 92) Älvdalen, Sweden

Sport
- Sport: Cross-country skiing
- Club: Älvdalens IF
Medal record
Men's cross-country skiing
Representing Sweden
Olympic Games
Silver medal – second place	1960 Squaw Valley	30 km
Bronze medal – third place	1960 Squaw Valley	50 km

Rolf Rämgård (born 30 March 1934) is a former Swedish cross-country skier. He competed in the 15, 30 and 50 km events at the 1960 Winter Olympics and won a silver medal over 30 km and a bronze over 50 km.

In the 1970s, Rämgård turned into politics and in 1974–85 was a member of the Swedish parliament and Municipal commissioner in his home municipality. He also became the minister of sports in the government and the mayor of the Älvdalen municipality.

== Cross-country skiing results ==
All results are sourced from the International Ski Federation (FIS).

=== Olympic Games ===
- 2 medals – (1 silver, 1 bronze)

Year	Age	15 km	30 km	50 km	4 × 10 km relay
1960	25	8	Silver	Bronze	—

=== World Championships ===
Year	Age	15 km	30 km	50 km	4 × 10 km relay
1958	23	—	20	11	—
