= Radya Yeroshina =

Soviet cross-country skier (1930–2012)

Medal record

Women's cross-country skiing

Representing Soviet Union

Olympic Games
Silver medal – second place	1956 Cortina d'Ampezzo	10 km
Silver medal – second place	1956 Cortina d'Ampezzo	3 × 5 km relay
Silver medal – second place	1960 Squaw Valley	3 × 5 km relay
Bronze medal – third place	1960 Squaw Valley	10 km

World Championships
Gold medal – first place	1958 Lahti	3 × 5 km relay
Bronze medal – third place	1962 Zakopane	10 km

Radya Nikolayevna Yeroshina (Russian: Радья Николаевна Ерошина; 17 September 1930 – 23 September 2012) was a Soviet cross-country skier who competed in the 1950s and 1960s, training at Lokomotiv in Moscow.

== Medals ==
She won four Winter Olympic medals with three silvers in the 10 km (1956 and the 3 × 5 km relay (1956, 1960) and a bronze in the 10 km (1960). She also won the 10 km event at the Holmenkollen ski festival in 1958.

Yeroshina also won two medals at the FIS Nordic World Ski Championships with a gold in the 3 × 5 km relay (1958) and a bronze in the 10 km (1962).

== Cross-country skiing results ==
=== Olympic Games ===
- 4 medals – (3 silver, 1 bronze)

Year	Age	10 km	3 × 5 km relay
1956	25	Silver	Silver
1960	29	Bronze	Silver

=== World Championships ===
- 2 medals – (1 gold, 1 bronze)

Year	Age	5 km	10 km	3 × 5 km relay
1958	27	—N/a	4	Gold
1962	31	—	Bronze	—
