= FIS Nordic World Ski Championships 1962 =

FIS edition of the Nordic World Ski Championships 1962

- Host city: Zakopane
- Country: Poland
- Events: 10
- Opening: 18 February 1962
- Closing: 25 February 1962

The FIS Nordic World Ski Championships 1962 took place from February 18 to 25, 1962 in Zakopane, Poland. Zakopane became the second city to host the world championships three times (1929, 1939, and 1962), joining Lahti, Finland (1926, 1938, and 1958). The women's 5 km and the individual normal hill ski jumping events made their debuts at these championships.

== Men's cross-country ==
=== 15 km ===
February 20, 1962

Medal	Athlete	Time
Gold	Assar Rönnlund (SWE)	55:22.8
Silver	Harald Grønningen (NOR)	55:52.4
Bronze	Einar Østby (NOR)	55:54.8

=== 30 km ===
February 18, 1962

Medal	Athlete	Time
Gold	Eero Mäntyranta (FIN)	1:52:39.4
Silver	Janne Stefansson (SWE)	1:52:49.1
Bronze	Giulio de Florian (ITA)	1:53:13.3

=== 50 km ===
February 24, 1962

Medal	Athlete	Time
Gold	Sixten Jernberg (SWE)	3:03:48.5
Silver	Assar Rönnlund (SWE)	3:05:39.1
Bronze	Kalevi Hämäläinen (FIN)	3:05:42.8

=== 4 × 10 km relay ===
February 22, 1962

Medal	Team	Time
Gold	Sweden (Lars Olsson, Sture Grahn, Sixten Jernberg, Assar Rönnlund)	2:24:38.8
Silver	Finland (Väinö Huhtala, Kalevi Laurila, Pentti Pesonen, Eero Mäntyranta)	2:25:24.3
Bronze	Soviet Union (Ivan Utrobin, Pavel Kolchin, Aleksey Kuznetsov, Gennady Vaganov)	2:26:14.3

== Women's cross-country ==
=== 5 km ===
February 19, 1962

Medal	Athlete	Time
Gold	Alevtina Kolchina (URS)	19:28.6
Silver	Lyubov Baranova (URS)	20:15.9
Bronze	Maria Gusakova (URS)	20:27.5

=== 10 km ===
February 21, 1962

Medal	Athlete	Time
Gold	Alevtina Kolchina (URS)	39:48.2
Silver	Maria Gusakova (URS)	40:59.9
Bronze	Radia Eroshina (URS)	41:17.1

=== 3 × 5 km relay ===
February 23, 1962

Medal	Team	Time
Gold	Soviet Union (Lyubov Baranova, Mariya Gusakova, Alevtina Kolchina)	58:08.9
Silver	Sweden (Barbro Martinsson, Britt Strandberg, Toini Gustafsson)	59:27.9
Bronze	Finland (Siiri Rantanen, Eeva Ruoppa, Mirja Lehtonen)	1:01:33.0

== Men's Nordic combined ==
=== Individual ===
February 19/20, 1962

Medal	Athlete	Points
Gold	Arne Larsen (NOR)	454.33
Silver	Dmitry Kochkin (URS)	448.77
Bronze	Ole Henrik Fagerås (NOR)	442.25

== Men's ski jumping ==
=== Individual normal hill ===
February 21, 1962

Medal	Athlete	Points
Gold	Toralf Engan (NOR)	
Silver	Antoni Łaciak (POL)	
Bronze	Helmut Recknagel (GDR)	

=== Individual large hill ===
February 25, 1962

Medal	Athlete	Points
Gold	Helmut Recknagel (GDR)	
Silver	Nikolay Kamenskiy (URS)	
Bronze	Niilo Halonen (FIN)	

== Medal table ==
Rank	Nation	Gold	Silver	Bronze	Total
1	Soviet Union (URS)	3	4	3	10
2	Sweden (SWE)	3	3	0	6
3	Norway (NOR)	2	1	2	5
4	Finland (FIN)	1	1	3	5
5	East Germany (GDR)	1	0	1	2
6	Poland (POL)	0	1	0	1
7	Italy (ITA)	0	0	1	1
Totals (7 entries)		10	10	10	30
