= Lyubov Kozyreva (cross-country skier) =

Soviet cross-country skier (1929–2015)

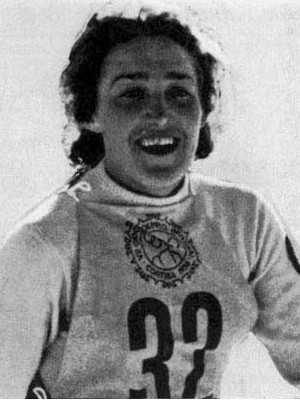

Medal record

Women's cross-country skiing

Representing Soviet Union

Olympic Games
Gold medal – first place	1956 Cortina d'Ampezzo	10 km
Silver medal – second place	1956 Cortina d'Ampezzo	3 × 5 km relay
Silver medal – second place	1960 Squaw Valley	10 km
Silver medal – second place	1960 Squaw Valley	3 × 5 km relay

World Championships
Gold medal – first place	1954 Falun	10 km
Gold medal – first place	1954 Falun	3 × 5 km relay
Gold medal – first place	1958 Lahti	3 × 5 km relay
Gold medal – first place	1962 Zakopane	3 × 5 km relay
Silver medal – second place	1958 Lahti	10 km
Silver medal – second place	1962 Zakopane	5 km

Lyubov Vladimirovna Kozyreva (Russian: Любо́вь Влади́мировна Ко́зырева), Lyubov Baranova from 1960 onwards (27 August 1929 – 22 June 2015), was a Soviet cross-country skier who competed in the 1950s and 1960s with VSS Burevestnik. She was born in the settlement of Bugry, Vsevolozhsky District, Leningrad Oblast and died in Moscow.

She won four Winter Olympic medals with a gold in the 10 km (1956) and silvers in the 10 km (1960) and the 3 × 5 km relay (1956, 1960). She also won the 10 km event at the Holmenkollen ski festival in 1955, becoming the first Soviet athlete to win at the Holmenkollen. Her biggest successes were at the FIS Nordic World Ski Championships where she won six medals, including four golds (10 km: 1954, 3 × 5 km relay: 1954, 1958, 1962) and two silvers (10 km: 1958, 5 km: 1962).

== Cross-country skiing results ==
All results are sourced from the International Ski Federation (FIS).

=== Olympic Games ===
- 4 medals – (1 gold, 3 silver)

Year	Age	10 km	3 × 5 km relay
1956	26	Gold	Silver
1960	30	Silver	Silver

=== World Championships ===
- 6 medals – (4 gold, 2 silver)

Year	Age	5 km	10 km	3 × 5 km relay
1954	24	—N/a	Gold	Gold
1958	28	—N/a	Silver	Gold
1962	32	Silver	4	Gold
