= Nikolay Gusakov =

Soviet Nordic combined skier (1934–1991)

Medal record

Men's Nordic combined

Representing Soviet Union

Olympic Games
Bronze medal – third place	1960 Squaw Valley	Individual

Nikolay Nikolayevich Gusakov (Russian: Никола́й Гусако́в; May 14, 1934 – December 14, 1991) was a former Soviet Nordic combined skier who won a bronze in the individual event at the 1960 Winter Olympics in Squaw Valley. He also won the Nordic combined event at the Holmenkollen ski festival in 1961.

Gusakov trained at the Armed Forces sports society in Moscow and later in Leningrad. He was the first Soviet athlete to win an Olympic medal in the Nordic combined and the first one to win the Nordic combined event at the Holmenkollen ski festival.
