= Cross-country skiing at the 1960 Winter Olympics =

Cross-country skiing at the VIII Olympic Winter Games
- Venue: McKinney Creek Stadium
- Dates: 19–27 February
- No. of events: 6
- Competitors: 112 from 19 nations

At the 1960 Winter Olympics six cross-country skiing events were contested. The competitions were held from Friday, 19 February, to Saturday, 27 February 1960. All the races took place at McKinney Creek Stadium, Tahoma, California, United States.

== Medal summary ==
=== Medal table ===
Rank	Nation	Gold	Silver	Bronze	Total
1	Sweden	2	2	1	5
2	Finland	2	1	2	5
3	Soviet Union	1	2	3	6
4	Norway	1	1	0	2
Totals (4 entries)		6	6	6	18

=== Men's events ===
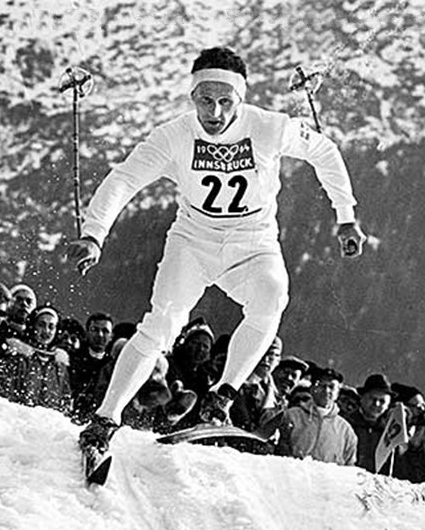
Sixten Jernberg

Event	Gold		Silver		Bronze	
15 km	Håkon Brusveen; Norway	51:55.5	Sixten Jernberg; Sweden	51:58.6	Veikko Hakulinen; Finland	52:03.00
30 km	Sixten Jernberg; Sweden	1:51:03.9	Rolf Rämgård; Sweden	1:51:16.9	Nikolay Anikin; Soviet Union	1:52:28.2
50 km	Kalevi Hämäläinen; Finland	2:59:06.3	Veikko Hakulinen; Finland	2:59:26.7	Rolf Rämgård; Sweden	3:02:46.7
4 × 10 km relay	Finland; Toimi Alatalo; Eero Mäntyranta; Väinö Huhtala; Veikko Hakulinen	2:18:45.6	Norway; Harald Grønningen; Hallgeir Brenden; Einar Østby; Håkon Brusveen	2:18:46.4	Soviet Union; Anatoly Shelyukhin; Gennady Vaganov; Aleksey Kuznetsov; Nikolay Anikin	2:21:21.6

=== Women's events ===
Event	Gold		Silver		Bronze	
10 km	Maria Gusakova; Soviet Union	39:46.6	Lyubov Baranova; Soviet Union	40:04.2	Radya Yeroshina; Soviet Union	40:06.0
3 × 5 km relay	Sweden; Irma Johansson; Britt Strandberg; Sonja Ruthström-Edström	1:04:21.4	Soviet Union; Radya Yeroshina; Maria Gusakova; Lyubov Baranova	1:05:02.6	Finland; Siiri Rantanen; Eeva Ruoppa; Toini Pöysti	1:06:27.5

== Participating nations ==
- Argentina (1)
- Australia (1)
- Bulgaria (4)
- Canada (2)
- Czechoslovakia (1)
- Finland (12)
- France (4)
- United Team of Germany (14)
- Great Britain (3)
- Hungary (2)
- Italy (9)
- Japan (4)
- South Korea (1)
- Norway (7)
- Poland (9)
- Soviet Union (11)
- Sweden (12)
- Switzerland (5)
- United States (10)
