= 1960 Winter Olympics =

Multi-sport event in Squaw Valley, California, US

Coordinates: 39°11′47″N 120°14′01″W

VIII Olympic Winter Games
- Emblem of the 1960 Winter Olympics (Note: The emblem represents a star or snowflake, and the Olympic rings.)
- Location: Squaw Valley, United States
- Nations: 30
- Athletes: 666 (522 men, 144 women)
- Events: 27 in 4 sports (8 disciplines)
- Opening: February 18, 1960
- Closing: February 28, 1960
- Opened by: Vice President Richard Nixon
- Closed by: IOC president Avery Brundage
- Cauldron: Ken Henry
- Stadium: Blyth Arena

Location in the United States
Location in California

The 1960 Winter Olympics (officially the VIII Olympic Winter Games and also known as Squaw Valley 1960) were a winter multi-sport event held from February 18 to 28, 1960, at the Squaw Valley Resort (now known as Palisades Tahoe) in Squaw Valley (now known as Olympic Valley), California, in the Lake Tahoe area of the United States. The resort was chosen to host the Games at the 1956 meeting of the International Olympic Committee (IOC). Squaw Valley was an undeveloped resort in 1955, so the infrastructure and all of the venues were built between 1956 and 1960 at a cost of US$80,000,000 (equivalent to $870,641,170 in 2025). The layout was designed to be intimate, allowing spectators and competitors to reach most of the venues on foot.

The 1960 Winter Games hosted athletes from 30 nations, competing in four sports and 27 events. Biathlon and women's speed skating made their Olympic debuts. Bobsled was not on the Winter Olympic program for the only time; the organizers had decided the events did not warrant the cost of building a bobsled venue after a poll indicated that only nine countries were planning to participate. These Olympics became the first to be televised live, making them accessible to millions of viewers in real time, and introduced multiple technological innovations, including instant replay.

== Host city selection ==
Squaw Valley, now called Palisades Tahoe, was a struggling ski resort in the Lake Tahoe region with minimal facilities, which made its selection to host the 1960 Winter Olympics a surprise. Wayne Poulsen and Alexander Cushing were inspired to bid for the Olympics by a newspaper article mentioning that Reno, Nevada, and Anchorage, Alaska, had expressed interest in the Games. Poulsen, president of the Squaw Valley Development Company, petitioned California governor Goodwin Knight to support a bid to host the Olympic Games. Knight's administration agreed and recommended that the California Legislature appropriate $1 million to the effort.

Based on the financial support received from the State of California, the United States Olympic Committee (USOC) approved the bid on January 7, 1955. Cushing and the USOC received a resolution passed by the United States Congress and signed by President Dwight Eisenhower, calling on the International Olympic Committee (IOC) to consider Squaw Valley's bid for the 1960 Games. Preliminary reports were drafted and submitted to the IOC, which was considering bids from Innsbruck, Austria and hosts of the first two Winter Olympics; St. Moritz, Switzerland (1928) and Chamonix, France (1924). During the planning stages of the 1960 Olympics, Innsbruck was the leading choice for the Olympic site. Cushing, however, managed to secure the bid after winning over the International Olympic Committee in Paris with a scale model of his planned Olympic site.

Squaw Valley was provisionally awarded the right to host the Games, but IOC president Avery Brundage—himself an American—warned the Organizing Committee that unless more funds were secured by April 1956, the bid would be awarded to Innsbruck. Another $4 million was committed by the state legislature, which met Brundage's requirements, and on April 4, 1956, the right to host the 1960 Winter Olympics was officially awarded to Squaw Valley. Competitors and officials from European nations were angered by the selection; they felt that the alpine ski courses were not up to specifications and that its base elevation of 6,200 feet (1,890 m) above sea level would prove too stressful on the athletes.

1960 Winter Olympics bidding results
City	Country	Round	
City	Country	1	2
Squaw Valley	United States	30	32
Innsbruck	Austria	24	30
Garmisch-Partenkirchen	West Germany	5	—
St. Moritz	Switzerland	3	—

== Organization ==
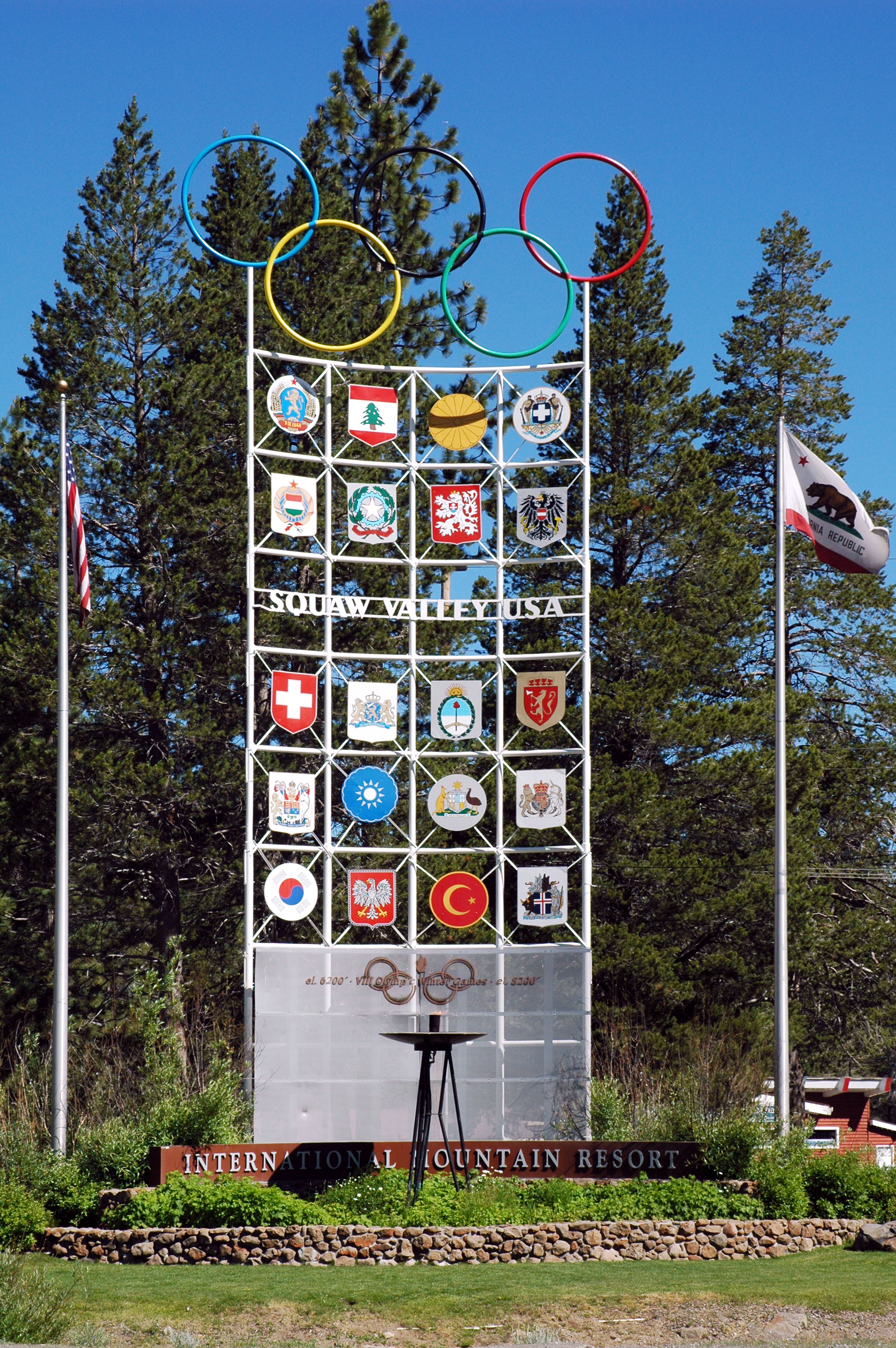
Sign outside the Olympic Village, 2011

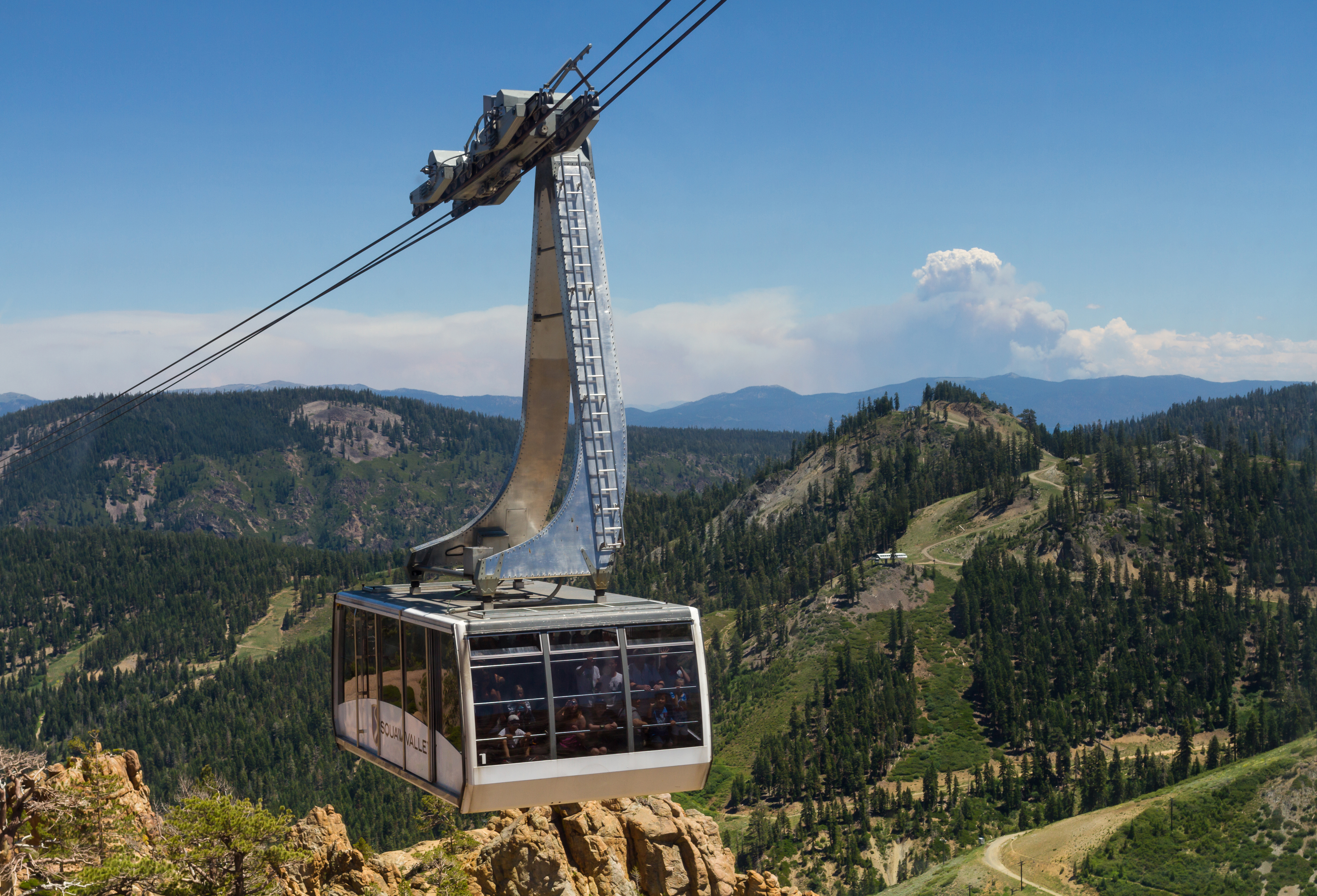
Aerial tram to High Camp

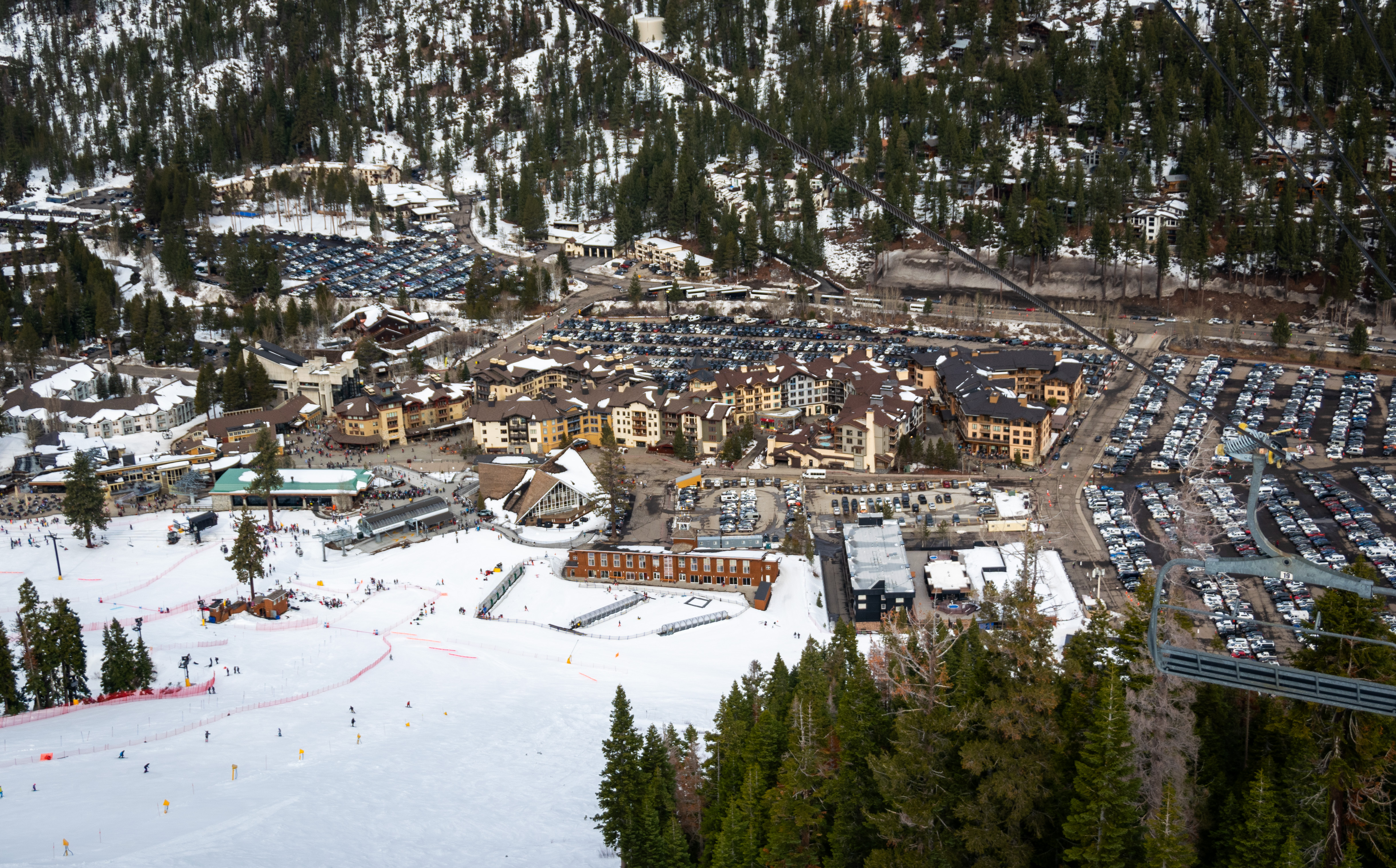
An elevated view of the village and some of the lifts at Palisades Tahoe

Squaw Valley in 1956 consisted of one chairlift, two rope tows, and a fifty-room lodge. Cushing promoted the site as a blank canvas of unspoiled environment where a world-class ski resort could be constructed. The obscurity of the location was underscored at the closing ceremonies of the 1956 Winter Olympics. Traditionally, the mayor of the current host city passes a flag to the mayor of the next host city, signaling the transfer of the Games. Because Squaw Valley was an unincorporated village with no municipal government, no mayor was available to receive the flag. John Garland, a member of the IOC from California, was asked to stand in and received the flag from the mayor of Cortina d'Ampezzo.

After winning the right to host the Games, the California Olympic Commission was formed. They were given four years to build venues, an Olympic Village, and expand infrastructure. With the expansion of roads, bridges, water and electrical capacity the resort of Squaw Valley became the city of Squaw Valley. Hotels, restaurants, administration buildings, a Sheriff's office and a sewage pumping and treatment plant were all constructed to support the influx of visitors for the Games. Organizers wanted the Olympics to be intimate with the venues close to one another. The Blyth Memorial Ice Arena was built along with three outdoor skating rinks, a 400-meter speed skating oval and four dormitories to house athletes. One venue deemed impractical to build was the bobsled run. Organizers felt the lack of possible entrants (a pre-Olympic poll indicated that only nine countries were planning to participate) and the high cost of building the run were sufficient deterrents to leave the bobsled events off the 1960 Olympic program.

Several design innovations and new technologies were used for the 1960 Games. The speed skating, figure skating and ice hockey events were held on artificial ice for the first time in Olympic history. A refrigeration plant capable of heating 4,800 homes had to be built to generate and maintain the ice. The heat generated from the refrigeration plant was used to warm spectators, provide hot water, and melt the snow off of roofs. New timing equipment provided by Longines was installed that used a quartz clock to measure to the hundredths of a second. IBM provided a computer that was capable of tabulating results and printing them in English and French. Blyth Arena, site of the opening and closing ceremonies as well as the figure skating and ice hockey competitions, was built with a 22 in (56 cm) gap in the roof, which would slide closed as the cables supporting the roof contracted during cold weather.

Funding for Cushing's initial bid to the IOC came from the California Legislature and investors in the "Squaw Valley Development Company", who were owners of the existing resort. To fund the construction, organizers turned to the federal government, which provided about a quarter of the $80 million required to host the Games. The monies were used to build sports arenas and provide military support for security during the Games. Further funding was secured from private sponsorships and from the State of California. Governor Knight and his successor Edmund "Pat" Brown remained behind the project, seeing it as a means to showcase the state of California to the world. In the end, the 1960 Winter Olympics became the first to be televised live, making the games accessible to millions of viewers in real-time. The event signaled the rise of United States skiing to the level of world-famous European skiing, and Squaw Valley's preparedness for the games showed the international community that United States ski resorts offered world-class facilities.

=== Television ===
Television was not new to the Olympic Winter Games; broadcasts of events to European audiences had begun in 1956. What was unprecedented was the sale of exclusive United States television rights to broadcast the Games. The Organizing Committee decided to sell the television broadcast rights to CBS for $50,000. Unknown at the time was how lucrative the sale of broadcast rights would become. For example, CBS purchased the rights to broadcast the 1960 Summer Olympics for $550,000. During the Games, CBS broadcast 15 and a quarter hours of television focusing on ice hockey, speed skating, figure skating, alpine skiing and ski jumping. The impact of television was felt during the Games; in the men's slalom event, officials who were unsure if a skier had missed a gate asked CBS if they could review tape of the event. This request gave CBS the idea for what is now known as instant replay.

== Politics ==
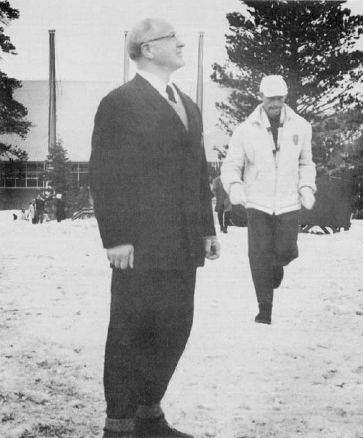
Brundage (left) examines the facilities in 1960

Athletic competition between the Soviet Union and United States had grown intense during the 1950s. Their opposing ideologies and interests in nations such as East and West Germany, China and North and South Korea created a delicate situation as the 1960 Winter Games approached. Of particular interest was the question of whether China would be allowed to participate. Chinese athletes last competed at the 1952 Summer Games but had since withdrawn from the IOC due to a dispute over Taiwan's participation as a separate country. The United States supported Taiwan while the Soviet Union stood behind China. Given that the 1960 Games were to be held in the US, there was concern among IOC members that the host nation would not allow China or any other Communist country to take part. In 1957, IOC president Avery Brundage, an American, announced that if the U.S. refused entry to any country recognized by the IOC, they would revoke Squaw Valley's invitation to host the Games and he would resign the presidency. The U.S. did allow athletes from Communist countries to participate. China continued calls for Taiwan to be expelled from the IOC, demands that were refused until China broke off relations ending any hope they would participate in the 1960 Games.

Problems similar to the issue with China broke out over North Korea and East Germany. Prior to the Korean War the IOC had recognized the Olympic committee of Korea, which was headquartered in Seoul. North Korea was not recognized as a separate country by the IOC, which maintained the existence of one Olympic committee. A unified team compromise was proposed but rejected by North Koreans, which meant only athletes from South Korea participated due to their prior recognition. Pressure for full recognition of East Germany continued despite the fact that both East and West Germany had participated as a unified team in 1956. One of the conditions for a unified German team was that the athletes be represented by a neutral flag. Initially West German officials refused to agree to this stipulation citing the fact that the West German flag had been used at both the 1956 Winter and Summer Games, although that flag was also used by East Germany prior to 1959. Eventually the neutral flag was adopted and a unified German team participated.

== Events ==
The Games were held from February 18 to 28. Medals were awarded in 27 events contested in 4 sports (8 disciplines). The sport of biathlon was added to the program as were speed skating events for women. After a poll was taken indicating that only nine countries would send a bobsled team, the organizers determined that bobsled would be removed from the Olympic program. Despite petitions from the International Bobsleigh and Tobogganing Federation to reconsider, the organizers felt they could not justify the costs of constructing a bobsled run for nine competing nations. It would be the only time in Winter Olympic history that the bobsled events were not held.

- Biathlon (1) ()
- Ice hockey (1) ()
- Skating
  - Figure skating (3) ()
  - Speed skating (8) ()
- Skiing
  - Alpine skiing (6) ()
  - Nordic skiing ()
    - Cross-country skiing (6) ()
    - Nordic combined (1) ()
    - Ski jumping (1) ()

=== Opening ceremonies ===
Photo of the opening day on the cover of Sports Illustrated

The chairman of the Pageantry Committee was Walt Disney, who was responsible for producing both the opening and closing ceremonies at Blyth Memorial Arena. He organized an opening that included 5,000 entertainers, the release of 2,000 pigeons, and a military gun salute of eight shots, one for each of the previous Winter Olympic Games. The opening ceremonies were held on February 18, 1960, at Blyth Arena in the midst of a blizzard. The heavy snow fall caused traffic problems that delayed the ceremony by an hour. The festivities began with a sustained drum roll as the flags of each participating nation were raised on specially designed flag poles. Vice President Richard Nixon represented the United States government and declared the Games open. The Olympic cauldron was lit by Kenneth Henry, Olympic champion of the 500 meter speed skating race at the 1952 Winter Olympics in Oslo. The Olympic oath was taken by Carol Heiss on behalf of all the athletes. As the national delegations left the stadium fireworks concluded the ceremonies.

=== Closing ceremonies ===
The Games were brought to a close on afternoon of February 28 at the Blyth Memorial Arena in front of 20,000 people. Flags of the participating nations were followed by the athletes who marched as a group with no national distinctions, a tradition carried over from the 1956 Summer Olympics. The flag bearers made a semi-circle around the rostrum and the national anthems of Greece (originators of the Olympic Games), the United States (hosts), and Austria (hosts of the 1964 Winter Olympics) were played as their respective flags were raised per tradition. IOC president Avery Brundage declared the Games closed, at which point the Olympic flame was extinguished. The ceremony concluded with the release of several thousand balloons.

== Sport competitions ==
=== Alpine skiing ===
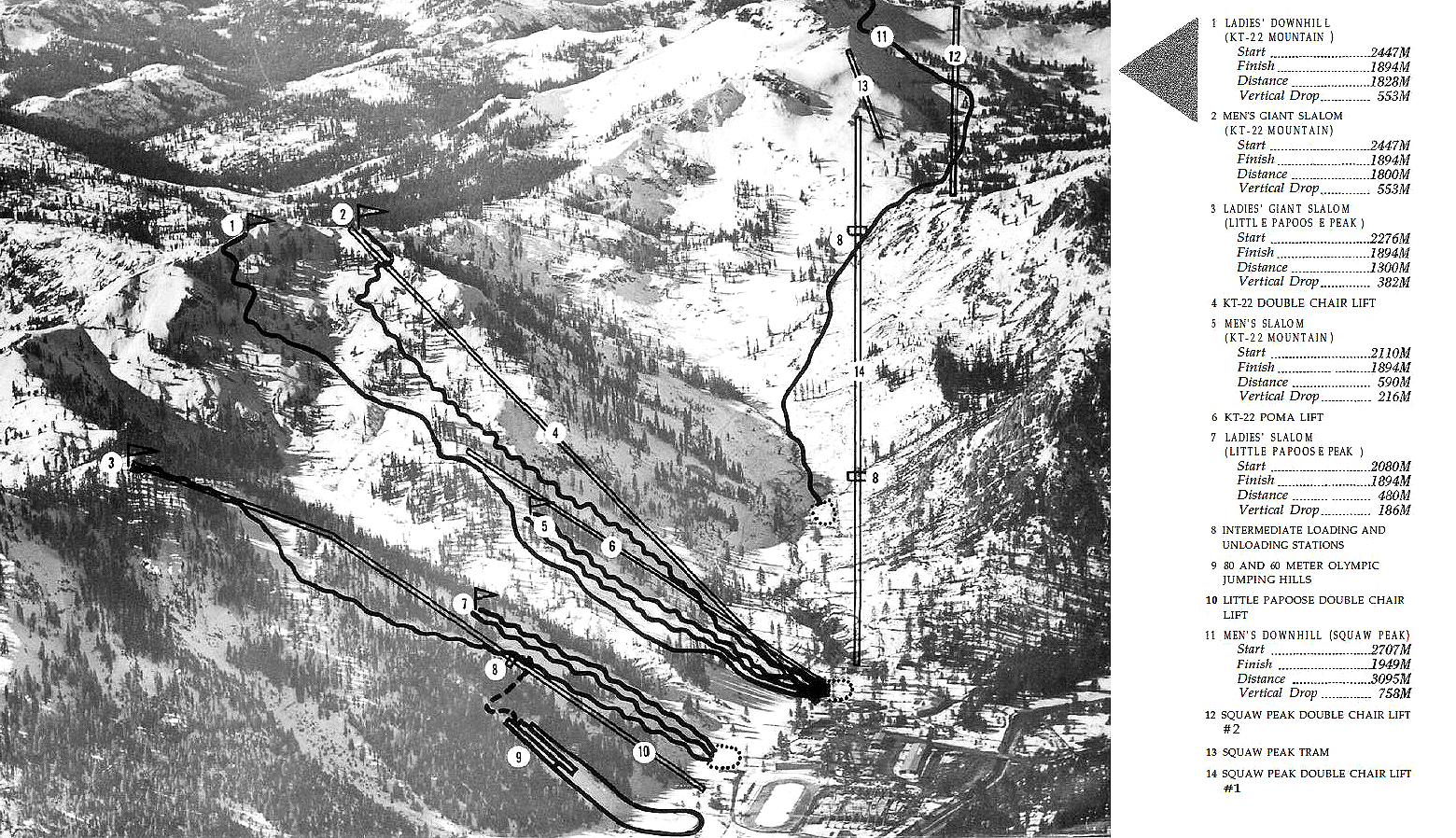
Alpine runs of the 1960 Winter Olympics

Despite the facilities being constructed from scratch at Squaw Valley, the resort did have steep mountain slopes in close proximity, resulting in some of the most difficult alpine skiing courses in Olympic history. Both men and women competed in the downhill, giant slalom and slalom with all 6 events held between February 20 and 26. The men's downhill was won by Frenchman Jean Vuarnet who changed the sport by becoming the first Olympic champion to use metal skis. Swiss skier Roger Staub won the giant slalom and Ernst Hinterseer from Austria was the slalom champion. German Heidi Biebl won the women's downhill, Yvonne Rüegg of Switzerland won the giant slalom and Anne Heggtveit from Canada won the slalom. Penny Pitou of the United States was the only multiple medal winner with two silvers in the downhill and giant slalom.

=== Biathlon ===
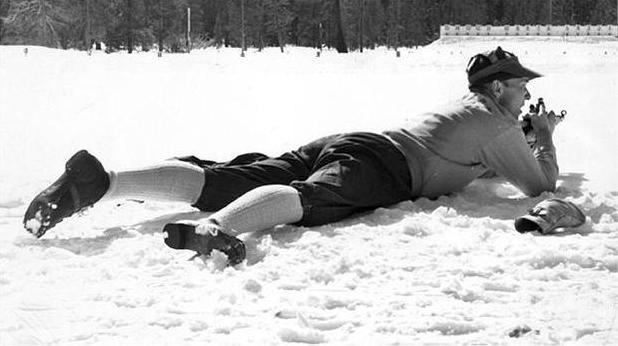
Klas Lestander during a biathlon competition

Biathlon made its Olympic debut in 1960. The precursor to biathlon, military patrol, was on the Olympic program for the first Olympic Games in 1924. It was a demonstration sport at the 1928, 1936, and 1948 Winter Olympics, though the competition was only open to members of the armed forces. Military patrol fell out of favor in 1948 due to anti-military sentiments in the post World War II era. Biathlon took its place and was instated as a full Olympic sport in 1960. It encompassed a 20 kilometer cross-country race with four shooting stations at ranges from 100 to 250 m (330 to 820 ft). Klas Lestander from Sweden became the first Olympic champion, Antti Tyrväinen from Finland and Soviet Aleksandr Privalov placed second and third respectively.

=== Cross-country skiing ===
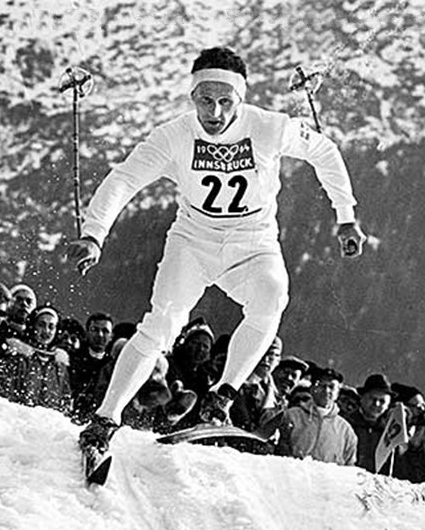
Sixten Jernberg in a cross-country race

There were six cross-country skiing races at the 1960 Olympics, four for men and two for women, all held at the McKinney Creek Cross-Country Complex. Soviet women swept the 10 kilometer race, which was the first medal sweep for the Soviets in cross-country skiing at the Winter Olympics. They were however upset by Sweden in the 3×5 kilometer relay. Nordic countries dominated the men's competition. Swedish lumberjack Sixten Jernberg added a gold and silver to the four medals he won in 1956. He would add two golds and a bronze in 1964 to finish his Olympic career with nine medals, which made him the most decorated Winter Olympian. Finnish skier Veikko Hakulinen added a gold, silver and bronze to the two golds and two silvers he had won in 1952 and 1956.

=== Figure skating ===
Held at Blyth Memorial Arena, the figure skating competition took place between February 19 and 26. Although this was not the first time figure skating had been held indoors, it would never be contested outdoors again. There were three events: men's and women's singles and the pairs competition. In the men's event, David Jenkins of the United States, brother of 1956 Winter Olympic figure skating champion Hayes Jenkins, won the gold medal. It was his second Olympic medal, having won the bronze in 1956. Czechoslovak Karol Divín took the silver medal, and Canadian Donald Jackson won the bronze. American Carol Heiss, winner of the silver medal in 1956, became the Olympic champion in 1960. A year later she married Hayes Jenkins and starred in Snow White and the Three Stooges. Dutch skater Sjoukje Dijkstra took the silver medal; she would finish her amateur career with an Olympic gold medal in 1964. Barbara Ann Roles gave the United States its third figure skating medal of the competition when she took the bronze. The Soviet Union made its Olympic figure skating debut by sending two couples to compete in the pairs competition; the result belied the fact that Soviet skaters would soon come to dominate this event. The competition was won by the Canadian pair of Barbara Wagner and Bob Paul who had won the last three world championships. The German pair Marika Kilius and Hans-Jürgen Bäumler followed their recent European championship victory with the Olympic silver medal, and the American husband-and-wife team of Ron and Nancy Ludington took the bronze.

=== Ice hockey ===
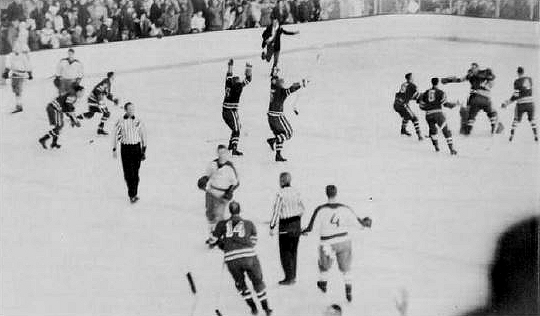
Ice hockey match between the United States and Soviet Union. The United States won the game, 3–2.

The ice hockey tournament took place at Blyth Arena and the Squaw Valley Olympic Skating Rink. Controversy over the amateur status of communist players overshadowed the event. Canadian Olympic officials objected to the use of "professional amateurs" by Eastern Bloc countries, and especially the Soviet Union. They alleged that the Soviets were giving their elite hockey players phantom jobs in the military that allowed them to play hockey full-time, which gave Soviet teams an advantage that they used to dominate Olympic hockey tournaments for more than 30 years. This issue started coming to light during the 1960 Games and would culminate in a Canadian boycott of the Olympic hockey tournament at the 1972 and 1976 Winter Olympics. The team from the United States won an improbable gold medal, defeating the favored Canadian and Soviet teams, who took silver and bronze respectively. This was the first Olympic gold medal in ice hockey for the United States and it would mark the last time the Soviet team did not win the Olympic tournament until the United States victory at the 1980 Winter Olympics. This was also the first and to date only Olympic ice hockey tournament to feature Australia.

=== Nordic combined ===
The Nordic combined competition was held on February 21 at the Squaw Valley normal hill and the McKinney Creek Cross-Country Complex. The athletes had three jumps on February 21 followed by a 15 kilometer cross-country race. German skier Georg Thoma became the first non-Nordic athlete to win the event. He would win bronze medal in the Nordic combined in 1964. Tormod Knutsen of Norway and Nikolay Gusakov of the Soviet Union placed second and third, respectively. Gusakov's wife, Maria Gusakova, competed in the cross-country events, winning a gold and silver.

=== Ski jumping ===
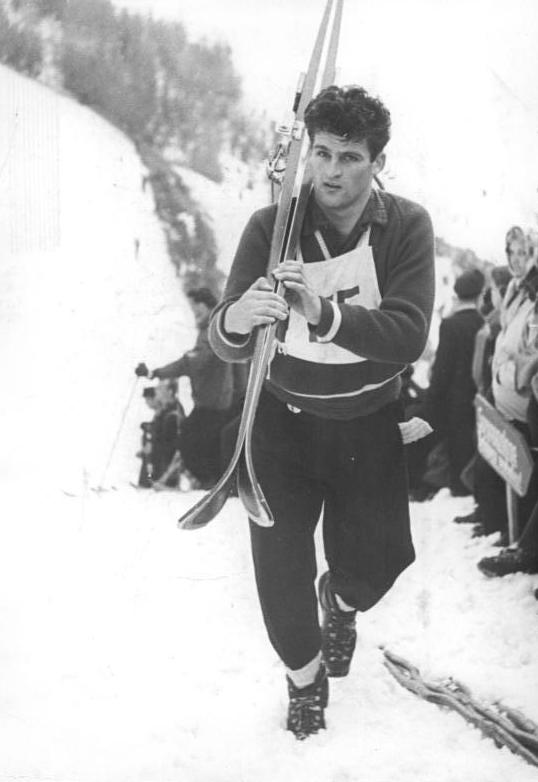
Helmut Recknagel at a ski jumping event

There was one ski jumping event at the 1960 Games, the men's normal hill, which was held on February 28. In 1964, the competition would be expanded to include a men's large hill event. Helmut Recknagel became the first German to win the event. In 1994 he would be joined by Jens Weißflog as the only German ski jumping Olympic champions. Niilo Halonen from Finland and Austrian Otto Leodolter earned the silver and bronze medals.

=== Speed skating ===
Women were allowed to compete in the Olympic speed skating competition for the first time in 1960. Multiple nations had requested the inclusion of women's speed skating events in the program for the 1956 Games, but the request was rejected by the IOC. The issue was revisited for the 1960 Games, and since women had been competing internationally since 1936 and there was a World Championship for women's speed skating, the IOC agreed to four events; 500, 1,000, 1,500, and 3,000 meters (the same as the number of men's events). Most of the events were held on the Squaw Valley Olympic Skating Rink, which was an outdoor skating oval, and featured artificial ice, a first for the Olympic speed skating competition. Given the altitude and the artificial ice, the rink was the fastest in the world, as evidenced by Norwegian Knut Johannesen's world record in the 10,000 meter event. At 15:46.6 he was the first skater ever to break the 16-minute barrier, and eclipsed the previous world record by 46 seconds. Despite Johannesen's victory, the Soviets dominated the speed skating events, winning all but two of the races. Yevgeny Grishin won both the 500 and 1,500 meter races, though he shared the 1,500 meter gold medal with Norwegian Roald Aas. Grishin said that "watching the Soviet flag wave in the blue American sky" was the proudest moment of his life. Lidiya Skoblikova from the Soviet Union was the other double gold medalist, when she won the 1,500 and 3,000 meter events. Polish skaters Helena Pilejczyk and Elwira Seroczyńska placed second and third in the 1,500 meter event, which were Poland's only medals of the Games. They were just the second and third Poles ever to win Winter Olympic medals.

== Calendar ==
All dates are in Pacific Standard Time (UTC-8)

The opening ceremony was held on February 18, along with the first games of the Ice hockey tournament. From February 19 to 28, at least one event final was held each day.

OC	Opening ceremony	●	Event competitions	1	Event finals	CC	Closing ceremony

February	18 Thu	19 Fri	20 Sat	21 Sun	22 Mon	23 Tue	24 Wed	25 Thu	26 Fri	27 Sat	28 Sun	Events
Ceremonies	OC										CC	—N/a
Ice hockey		●	●	●	●	●	●	●	●	●	1	1
Figure skating		1				1			1			3
Speed skating			1	1	1	1	1	1	1	1		8
Alpine skiing			1	1	1	1	1		1			6
Cross-country skiing		1	1			1		1	1	1		6
Nordic combined				●	1							1
Ski jumping											1	1
Biathlon				1								1
Daily medal events		2	3	3	3	4	2	2	4	2	2	27
Cumulative Total		2	5	8	11	15	17	19	23	25	27	27
February	18 Thu	19 Fri	20 Sat	21 Sun	22 Mon	23 Tue	24 Wed	25 Thu	26 Fri	27 Sat	28 Sun	Total events

† The numeral indicates the number of event finals for each sport held that day.

== Venues ==
Location of Squaw Valley and Tahoma (the site of the cross-country races) within the Lake Tahoe region

The lack of facilities prior to the Olympics gave organizers freedom to tailor the layout of the venues to fit the needs of the athletes. Their vision was for an intimate Games in which athletes and spectators could walk between venues. This was accomplished with the exception of the cross-country events, which were held at McKinney Creek in Tahoma on the western side of Lake Tahoe, a 12 mi (19 km) drive from Squaw Valley. In prior Winter Olympics the athletes were housed in hotels or billeted with local families. Since no such facilities existed in Squaw Valley, the organizers decided to build the first Olympic Village at the Winter Games. Competitors slept in one of four dormitories and ate together in a dining room. The complex was located centrally, with access to all the sporting facilities.

The peaks surrounding Squaw Valley were used for the alpine skiing events. The ladies' downhill and men's slalom and giant slalom were on KT-22 mountain, while the ladies' slalom and giant slalom were contested on Little Papoose Peak. Squaw Peak was the site of the men's downhill competition. Prior to the Games, concerns persisted that the courses would not meet international standards. To address these concerns, a test event was held in 1959 and the attending delegates from the International Ski Federation (FIS) left assured that the events would comply with FIS rules and specifications. Bleachers were constructed for officials, coaches and spectators, along with broadcast booths for radio and television. Papoose Peak Jumps was located on Little Papoose Peak directly opposite Blyth Memorial Arena. Designed by Heini Klopfer, the hill was innovative in that it had 40-, 60-, and 80–meter jumps. Tall trees on both sides protected athletes from the wind, and it was situated so that the sun would be at the jumper's back during the competition.

McKinney Creek Stadium was built in Tahoma, California, on the western side of Lake Tahoe, to host all of the cross-country races, which included the biathlon and a portion of the Nordic combined competition. The organizing committee originally intended to house all events in Squaw Valley proper, but real estate developments in Squaw Valley made this difficult. The venue consisted of a timing building, two Quonset huts for competitors and course workers, a scoreboard, and bleachers to accommodate 1,200 people. Shooting ranges were interspersed throughout the biathlon course, and were supervised by non-commissioned officers of the United States military.

Season tickets for the Games ranged from $60 to $250, the latter included a reserved seat at the ice arena; the daily admission fee was $7.50.

Blyth Memorial Arena was the centerpiece of the Games. It hosted the opening and closing ceremonies jointly with Squaw Valley Olympic Skating Rink, and also hosted the figure skating competition, a few of the speed skating events, as well as most of the games in the hockey tournament. All three of the sports were held indoors on artificial ice for the first time in Olympic history. At full capacity, the arena accommodated 11,000 people, 8,500 of whom were seated. One end of the stadium could be opened and closed, depending on the event. During the ceremonies it was open to allow for the entrance of the athletes; during the competitions it was closed to accommodate more spectators. A special machine was created to resurface the ice for all three competitions. It could lay a new ice surface on the 400-meter speed skating track in 45 minutes. In addition to resurfacing the ice, the machine created the snow dividers that delineated the racing lanes. The roof was designed on a suspension principle, using cables rather than vertical supports; this removed any visual impediments for the audience, but it weakened the strength of the roof. Given the amount of annual snowfall designers planned on using heat generated by the refrigeration plant to melt the snow. There were flaws in the design and miscalculations in the load the roof could bear, and during a particularly heavy snowfall in 1983, a portion of the roof collapsed and the building was subsequently demolished.

As of 2016, three buildings from the 1960 Winter Olympics remain in Palisades Tahoe (formerly known as Squaw Valley). An expansion of the resort's village, currently in the planning stages, would see two of these buildings demolished.

== Participating nations ==
Athletes from 30 nations competed at the 1960 Games. South Africa competed at the Winter Games for the first time; it would be the last until 1994. Athletes from West Germany (FRG) and East Germany (GDR) competed together as the United Team of Germany from 1956 to 1964. This was the first time Greece did not participate in a Winter Olympics since 1932. The number at the end of each country denotes the number of athletes each country sent.

Participating National Olympic Committees
- Argentina (6)
- Australia (31)
- Austria (26)
- Bulgaria (7)
- Canada (44)
- Chile (5)
- Czechoslovakia (21)
- Denmark (1)
- Finland (48)
- France (26)
- Great Britain (17)
- Hungary (3)
- Iceland (4)
- Italy (28)
- Japan (41)
- Lebanon (2)
- Liechtenstein (3)
- Netherlands (7)
- New Zealand (4)
- Norway (29)
- Poland (13)
- South Africa (4)
- South Korea (7)
- Soviet Union (62)
- Spain (4)
- Sweden (47)
- Switzerland (21)
- Turkey (2)
- United States (79) (host)
- United Team of Germany (74)

=== Number of athletes by National Olympic Committee ===
IOC Letter Code	Country	Athletes
USA	United States	79
EUA	United Team of Germany	74
URS	Soviet Union	62
FIN	Finland	48
SWE	Sweden	47
CAN	Canada	44
JAP	Japan	41
AUS	Australia	31
NOR	Norway	29
ITA	Italy	28
AUT	Austria	26
FRA	France	26
CZE	Czechoslovakia	21
SWI	Switzerland	21
GRB	Great Britain	17
POL	Poland	13
BUL	Bulgaria	7
KOR	South Korea	7
NET	Netherlands	7
ARG	Argentina	6
CHI	Chile	5
ICE	Iceland	4
NZE	New Zealand	4
SAF	South Africa	4
SPA	Spain	4
HUN	Hungary	3
LIE	Liechtenstein	3
LEB	Lebanon	2
TUR	Turkey	2
DEN	Denmark	1
Total		665

== Medal count ==
Below is a list of nations that won medals at the Games:

Rank	Nation	Gold	Silver	Bronze	Total
1	Soviet Union	7	5	9	21
2	United Team of Germany	4	3	1	8
3	United States*	3	4	3	10
4	Norway	3	3	0	6
5	Sweden	3	2	2	7
6	Finland	2	3	3	8
7	Canada	2	1	1	4
8	Switzerland	2	0	0	2
9	Austria	1	2	3	6
10	France	1	0	2	3
11	Netherlands	0	1	1	2
11	Poland	0	1	1	2
13	Czechoslovakia	0	1	0	1
14	Italy	0	0	1	1
Totals (14 entries)		28	26	27	81

- The host nation is highlighted in blue.

‡ Since there was a tie in the men's 1,500 meter speed skating race (like in 1956), two gold medals and no silver medals were awarded.

=== Podium sweeps ===
Date	Sport	Event	NOC	Gold	Silver	Bronze
February 20	Cross-country skiing	Women's 10 kilometer	Soviet Union	Maria Gusakova	Lyubov Kozyreva	Radia Yeroshina

== See also ==
- 1960 Summer Olympics
- List of 1960 Winter Olympics medal winners
- Olympic Games
- Winter Olympic Games
- Other Olympic Games celebrated in the United States
  - 1904 Summer Olympics – St. Louis
  - 1932 Summer Olympics – Los Angeles
  - 1932 Winter Olympics – Lake Placid
  - 1980 Winter Olympics – Lake Placid
  - 1984 Summer Olympics – Los Angeles
  - 1996 Summer Olympics – Atlanta
  - 2002 Winter Olympics – Salt Lake City
  - 2028 Summer Olympics – Los Angeles
  - 2034 Winter Olympics – Salt Lake City

Winter Olympics
Preceded by Cortina d'Ampezzo	VIII Olympic Winter Games; Squaw Valley; 1960	Succeeded by Innsbruck
