= Nordic skiing at the 1956 Winter Olympics =

At the 1956 Winter Olympics in Cortina d'Ampezzo, eight Nordic skiing events were contested – six cross-country skiing events, one ski jumping event, and one Nordic combined event.

Nordic skiing discipline	Men's events	Women's events
Cross-country skiing	• 15 km	• 10 km
Cross-country skiing	• 30 km	• 10 km
Cross-country skiing	• 50 km	• 10 km
Cross-country skiing	• 4 × 10 km relay	• 3 × 5 km relay
Ski jumping	• Large hill (70m)	none
Nordic combined	• Individual	none

== Medal summary ==
=== Men's events ===
==== Cross-country skiing ====
Event	Gold	Silver	Bronze
15 km	Hallgeir Brenden; Norway	Sixten Jernberg; Sweden	Pavel Kolchin; Soviet Union
30 km	Veikko Hakulinen; Finland	Sixten Jernberg; Sweden	Pavel Kolchin; Soviet Union
50 km	Sixten Jernberg; Sweden	Veikko Hakulinen; Finland	Fyodor Terentyev; Soviet Union
4 × 10 km relay	Soviet Union; Fyodor Terentyev; Pavel Kolchin; Nikolay Anikin; Vladimir Kuzin	Finland; August Kiuru; Jorma Kortelainen; Arvo Viitanen; Veikko Hakulinen	Sweden; Lennart Larsson; Gunnar Samuelsson; Per-Erik Larsson; Sixten Jernberg

==== Ski jumping ====
Event	Gold	Silver	Bronze
Normal hill	Antti Hyvärinen; Finland	Aulis Kallakorpi; Finland	Harry Glaß; United Team of Germany

==== Nordic combined ====
Event	Gold	Silver	Bronze
Individual	Sverre Stenersen; Norway	Bengt Eriksson; Sweden	Franciszek Gąsienica Gron; Poland

=== Women's events ===
==== Cross-country skiing ====
Event	Gold	Silver	Bronze
10 km	Lyubov Kozyreva; Soviet Union	Radia Yeroshina; Soviet Union	Sonja Edström; Sweden
3 × 5 km relay	Finland; Sirkka Polkunen; Mirja Hietamies; Siiri Rantanen	Soviet Union; Lyubov Kozyreva; Alevtina Kolchina; Radya Yeroshina	Sweden; Irma Johansson; Anna-Lisa Eriksson; Sonja Edström
