= Finland at the 1956 Winter Olympics =

- IOC code: FIN
- NOC: Finnish Olympic Committee
- Website: sport.fi/olympiakomitea (in Finnish and Swedish)

in Cortina d'Ampezzo
- Competitors: 31 (27 men, 4 women) in 6 sports
- Flag bearers: Antti Hyvärinen, Ski Jumping
- Medals Ranked 3rd: Gold 3 Silver 3 Bronze 1 Total 7

Winter Olympics appearances (overview)
- 1924; 1928; 1932; 1936; 1948; 1952; 1956; 1960; 1964; 1968; 1972; 1976; 1980; 1984; 1988; 1992; 1994; 1998; 2002; 2006; 2010; 2014; 2018; 2022; 2026

Finland competed at the 1956 Winter Olympics in Cortina d'Ampezzo, Italy.

== Medalists ==
Medal	Name	Sport	Event
Gold	Veikko Hakulinen	Cross-country skiing	Men's 30 km
Gold	Mirja Hietamies; Sirkka Polkunen; Siiri Rantanen	Cross-country skiing	Women's 3 x 5 km relay
Gold	Antti Hyvärinen	Ski jumping	Men's normal hill (K90 individual 70m)
Silver	Veikko Hakulinen	Cross-country skiing	Men's 50 km
Silver	Veikko Hakulinen; August Kiuru; Jorma Kortelainen; Arvo Viitanen	Cross-country skiing	Men's 4 × 10 km relay
Silver	Aulis Kallakorpi	Ski jumping	Men's normal hill (K90 individual 70m)
Bronze	Toivo Salonen	Speed skating	Men's 1500m

== Alpine skiing ==
Men

Athlete	Event	Race 1		Race 2		Total	
Athlete	Event	Time	Rank	Time	Rank	Time	Rank
Pentti Alonen	Downhill					DSQ	–
Kalevi Häkkinen	Downhill					3:29.2	23
Kalevi Häkkinen	Giant Slalom					3:36.9	43
Pentti Alonen	Giant Slalom					3:35.0	42
Pentti Alonen	Slalom	DSQ	–	–	–	DSQ	–
Kalevi Häkkinen	Slalom	1:53.8	41	2:25.4 (+0:05)	36	4:19.2	40

== Cross-country skiing ==
Men

Event	Athlete	Race	
Event	Athlete	Time	Rank
15 km	Arto Tiainen	54:11	26
15 km	Veikko Räsänen	52:35	14
15 km	Arvo Viitanen	51:10	9
15 km	Veikko Hakulinen	50:31	4
30 km	August Kiuru	1'51:56	21
30 km	Kalevi Hämäläinen	1'51:38	20
30 km	Olavi Latsa	1'47:30	9
30 km	Veikko Hakulinen	1'44:06	1st place, gold medalist(s)
50 km	Veini Kontinen	3'06:15	9
50 km	Antti Sivonen	3'04:16	8
50 km	Eero Kolehmainen	2'56:17	4
50 km	Veikko Hakulinen	2'51:45	2nd place, silver medalist(s)

Men's 4 × 10 km relay

Athletes	Race	
Athletes	Time	Rank
August Kiuru; Jorma Kortelainen; Arvo Viitanen; Veikko Hakulinen	2'16:31	2nd place, silver medalist(s)

Women

Event	Athlete	Race	
Event	Athlete	Time	Rank
10 km	Sanna Kiero	40:52	12
10 km	Sirkka Polkunen	40:25	8
10 km	Mirja Hietamies	40:18	6
10 km	Siiri Rantanen	39:40	5

Women's 3 x 5 km relay

Athletes	Race	
Athletes	Time	Rank
Sirkka Polkunen; Mirja Hietamies; Siiri Rantanen	1'09:01	1st place, gold medalist(s)

== Figure skating ==
Men

Athlete	CF	FS	Points	Places	Rank
Kalle Tuulos	15	15	124.50	137	15

== Nordic combined ==
Events:

- normal hill ski jumping (Three jumps, best two counted and shown here.)
- 15 km cross-country skiing

Athlete	Event	Ski Jumping				Cross-country			Total	
Athlete	Event	Distance 1	Distance 2	Points	Rank	Time	Points	Rank	Points	Rank
Esko Jussila	Individual	63.5	65.0	194.0	21	1'02:38	215.500	27	409.500	25
Paavo Korhonen	Individual	65.5	69.5	196.5	17	56:32	239.097	2	435.597	4
Eeti Nieminen	Individual	70.5	68.0	206.0	8	1'00:20	224.400	14	430.400	9

== Ski jumping ==
Athlete	Event	Jump 1			Jump 2			Total	
Athlete	Event	Distance	Points	Rank	Distance	Points	Rank	Points	Rank
Hemmo Silvennoinen	Normal hill	75.5	102.5	15	77.0	105.0	8	207.5	10
Eino Kirjonen	Normal hill	78.0	107.5	7	81.0	111.5	2	219.0	7
Antti Hyvärinen	Normal hill	81.0	111.5	3	84.0	115.5	1	227.0	1st place, gold medalist(s)
Aulis Kallakorpi	Normal hill	83.5	114.5	2	80.5	110.5	5	225.0	2nd place, silver medalist(s)

== Speed skating ==
Men

Event	Athlete	Race	
Event	Athlete	Time	Rank
500 m	Yrjö Uimonen	42.5	13
500 m	Juhani Järvinen	42.2	9
500 m	Matti Hamberg	42.2	9
500 m	Toivo Salonen	41.7	5
1500 m	Leo Tynkkynen	2:16.2	26
1500 m	Matti Hamberg	2:14.8	18
1500 m	Juhani Järvinen	2:09.7	4
1500 m	Toivo Salonen	2:09.4	3rd place, bronze medalist(s)
5000 m	Matti Hamberg	8:28.1	32
5000 m	Leo Tynkkynen	8:19.9	25
5000 m	Kauko Salomaa	8:14.3	21
5000 m	Juhani Järvinen	8:13.7	20
10,000 m	Toivo Salonen	17:37.6	24
10,000 m	Kauko Salomaa	17:19.0	17
10,000 m	Juhani Järvinen	17:05.9	12
