= Cross-country skiing at the 1956 Winter Olympics – Men's 4 × 10 kilometre relay =

Men's 4 × 10 kilometre relay at the VII Olympic Winter Games
- Cross-country skiing
- Venue: Lo Stadio della neve
- Date: 4 February 1956
- Competitors: 56 from 14 nations
- Winning time: 2:15:30

Medalists
1st place, gold medalist(s)		Fedor Terentyev; Pavel Kolchin; Nikolai Anikin; Vladimir Kuzin	Soviet Union
2nd place, silver medalist(s)		August Kiuru; Jorma Kortelainen; Arvo Viitanen; Veikko Hakulinen	Finland
3rd place, bronze medalist(s)		Lennart Larsson; Gunnar Samuelsson; Per-Erik Larsson; Sixten Jernberg	Sweden

The men's 4 × 10 kilometre relay at the 1956 Winter Olympics took place on 4 February. It was held at the Snow Stadium (Lo Stadio della neve), which was about 2 km (1.2 mi) from Cortina. Fourteen teams and fifty-six skiers participated in the event. The Soviet team won the event. Finland came in second and Sweden took the bronze.

== Medalists ==
Medal	Team	Time
Gold	Soviet Union (Fedor Terentyev, Pavel Kolchin, Nikolai Anikin, Vladimir Kuzin)	2:15.30
Silver	Finland (August Kiuru, Jorma Kortelainen, Arvo Viitanen, Veikko Hakulinen)	2:16.31
Bronze	Sweden (Lennart Larsson, Gunnar Samuelsson, Per-Erik Larsson, Sixten Jernberg)	2:17.42

== Results ==
Rank	Bib	Country	Time	Deficit*
1	6	Soviet Union; Fedor Terentyev; Pavel Kolchin; Nikolai Anikin; Vladimir Kuzin	2:15.30; 33:25; 33:05; 34:23; 34:37	+0.00
2	2	Finland; August Kiuru; Jorma Kortelainen; Arvo Viitanen; Veikko Hakulinen	2:16.31; 34:56; 34:20; 33:34; 33:41	+1:01
3	14	Sweden; Lennart Larsson; Gunnar Samuelsson; Per-Erik Larsson; Sixten Jernberg	2:17.42; 35:46; 34:22; 33:50; 33:44	+2:12
4	4	Norway; Håkon Brusveen; Per Olsen; Martin Stokken; Hallgeir Brenden	2:21.16; 35:13; 36:41; 34:47; 34:35	+5:46
5	1	Italy; Pompeo Fattor; Ottavio Compagnoni; Innocenzo Chatrian; Federico Deflorian	2:23.28; 35:43; 34:55; 35:59; 36:51	+7.58
6	9	France; Victor Arbez; René Mandrillon; Benoit Carrara; Jean Mermet	2:24.06; 36:51; 36:14; 35:18; 35:43	+8.36
7	8	Switzerland; Werner Zwingli; Victor Kronig; Fritz Kocher; Marcel Huguenin	2:24.30; 36:24; 36:50; 35:17; 35:59	+9.00
8	3	Czechoslovakia; Emil Okuliár; Vlastimil Melich; Josef Prokes; Ilja Matous	2:24.54; 37:02; 36:11; 36:13; 35:28	+9.24
9	12	Poland; Jozef Rubis; Józef Gąsienica-Sobczak; Tadeusz Kwapien; Andrzej Mateja	2:25.55; 37:03; 36:40; 35:49; 36:23	+10.25
10	11	United Team of Germany; Kuno Werner; Siegried Weiss; Rudi Kropp; Hermann Mochel	2:26.37; 36:19; 37:21; 36:35; 36:22	+11.07
11	13	Austria; Sepp Schneeberger; Oskar Schulz; Hermann Mayer; Karl Refreider	2:30.50; 35:26; 38:37; 39:09; 37:38	+15.20
12	10	United States; Ted Farwell; Mack Miller; Lawrence Damon; Marvin Crawford	2:32.04; 37:42; 37:22; 37:27; 39:33	+16.34
13	5	Yugoslavia; Zravko Hlebanja; Cveto Pavcic; Matevz Kordez; Janez Pavcic	2:33.45; 38:10; 39:03; 38:27; 38:05	+18.15
14	7	Great Britain; Andrew Morgan; James Spencer; Aubrey Fielder; Maurice Gover	2:38.44; 38:44; 40:40; 39:25; 39:55	+23.14

* Deficit is minutes and seconds

== See also ==
- List of IOC country codes
- 1956 Winter Olympics
