= Håkon Brusveen =

Norwegian cross-country skier (1927–2021)

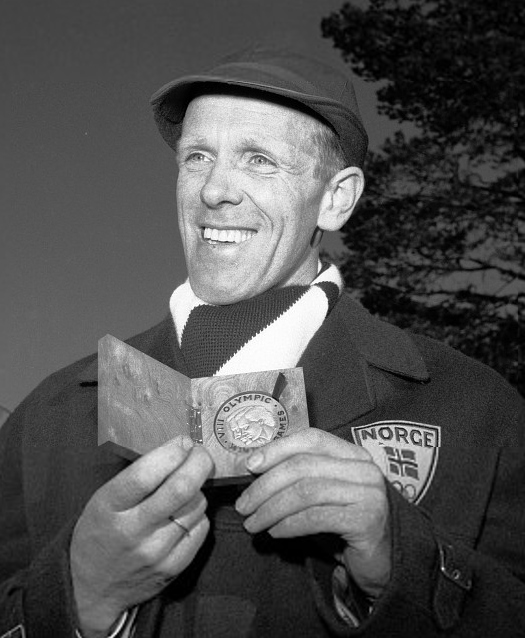
- Brusveen at the 1960 Olympics

Personal information
- Born: 15 July 1927 Vingrom, Norway
- Died: 21 April 2021 (aged 93) Lillehammer

Sport
- Sport: Cross-country skiing
- Club: Vingrom IL
Medal record
Representing Norway
Olympic Games
Gold medal – first place	1960 Squaw Valley	15 km
Silver medal – second place	1960 Squaw Valley	4 × 10 km relay

Håkon Brusveen (15 July 1927 – 21 April 2021) was a Norwegian cross-country skier. He competed in the individual 15 km and 4 × 10 km relay events at the 1956 and 1960 Olympics and won two medals in 1960: a gold in the 15 km and a silver in the relay; in 1956 he placed fifth and fourth, respectively. In 1958 he was awarded the Holmenkollen medal, and in 1960 the Morgenbladet Gold Medal. A freelance sports broadcaster for NRK for 35 years, he was a pioneering color commentator of cross-country skiing events.

== Career ==
Brusveen had chronic asthmatic bronchitis and took up skiing to improve his condition. In 1952, he placed fifth in the Olympic trials and was selected as a reserve for the Olympic skiing team. He won the national 30 km title in 1953, 1957 and 1958, and around that time opened a sport shop in Lillehammer. Brusveen was originally selected as a substitute member for the 1960 Norwegian Olympic team, but performed well shortly before the Olympics, and was included in the main team upon personal recommendation from King Olav V of Norway. At the Olympics he won the 15 km race, beating Sixten Jernberg by 3 seconds at the finish, but lost by 0.8 seconds to Veikko Hakulinen in the last leg of the 4 × 10 km relay, despite having a 20-second lead at the start.

After the 1960 Olympics Brusveen changed to biathlon, but failed to qualify for the 1964 Olympics by a small margin. From the 1960s onwards he became a popular radio commentator of cross-country skiing events for Norsk Rikskringkasting. He was a freelance color commentator for NRK for 35 years starting in 1963, and labeled the first such in Norway. He often collaborated with Bjørge Lillelien on live broadcasting of cross-country events. As a cross-country expert, his reporting style was pioneering at the time; situated somewhere out by the tracks, he commented on skiers' speed, technique, and look when they passed. His last assignment as a sports reporter was the winter season of 1997.

Brusveen was awarded the Holmenkollen Medal in 1958, jointly with Inger Bjørnbakken, and the Morgenbladet Gold Medal in 1960. He was portrayed by Arvid Møller in 1965, in the book 3–2–1–Gå. Håkon Brusveen forteller til Arvid Møller. On his 90th birthday in 2017, a Brusveen exhibition opened at the Norwegian Olympic Museum.

Brusveen died at the age of 93 in Lillehammer on 21 April 2021.

== Cross-country skiing results ==
All results are sourced from the International Ski Federation (FIS).

=== Olympic Games ===
- 2 medals – (1 gold, 1 silver)

Year	Age	15 km	30 km	50 km	4 × 10 km relay
1956	28	5	—	—	4
1960	32	Gold	—	—	Silver

=== World Championships ===
Year	Age	15 km	30 km	50 km	4 × 10 km relay
1954	26	20	—	—	4
1958	30	5	17	—	4
