= Veikko Räsänen =

Finnish cross-country skier

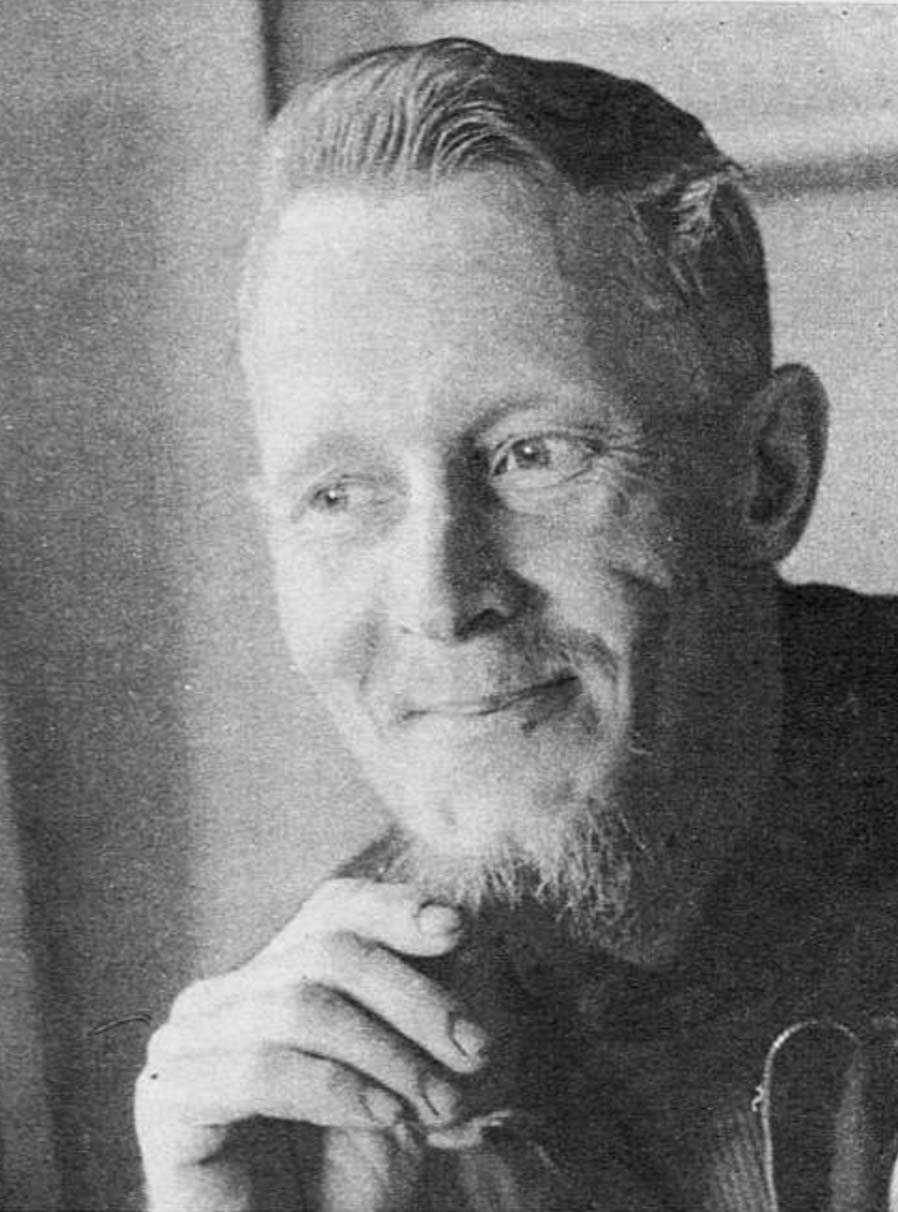

Personal information
- Nationality: Finnish
- Born: 5 August 1928 Maaninka, Finland
- Died: 29 December 2003 (aged 75)

Sport
- Sport: Cross-country skiing

Veikko Räsänen (5 August 1928 – 29 December 2003) was a Finnish cross-country skier. He competed at the 1956 Winter Olympics and the 1960 Winter Olympics.

== Cross-country skiing results ==
All results are sourced from the International Ski Federation (FIS).

=== Olympic Games ===
Year	Age	15 km	30 km	50 km	4 × 10 km relay
1956	27	14	—	—	—
1960	31	—	—	8	—

=== World Championships ===
Year	Age	15 km	30 km	50 km	4 × 10 km relay
1954	25	6	—	—	—
1958	29	13	8	—	—
