= Arto Tiainen =

Finnish cross-country skier

Medal record

Men's cross-country skiing

Representing Finland

Olympic Games
Silver medal – second place	1964 Innsbruck	4 × 10 km relay
Bronze medal – third place	1964 Innsbruck	50 km

World Championships
Silver medal – second place	1966 Oslo	50 km
Bronze medal – third place	1958 Lahti	4 × 10 km relay

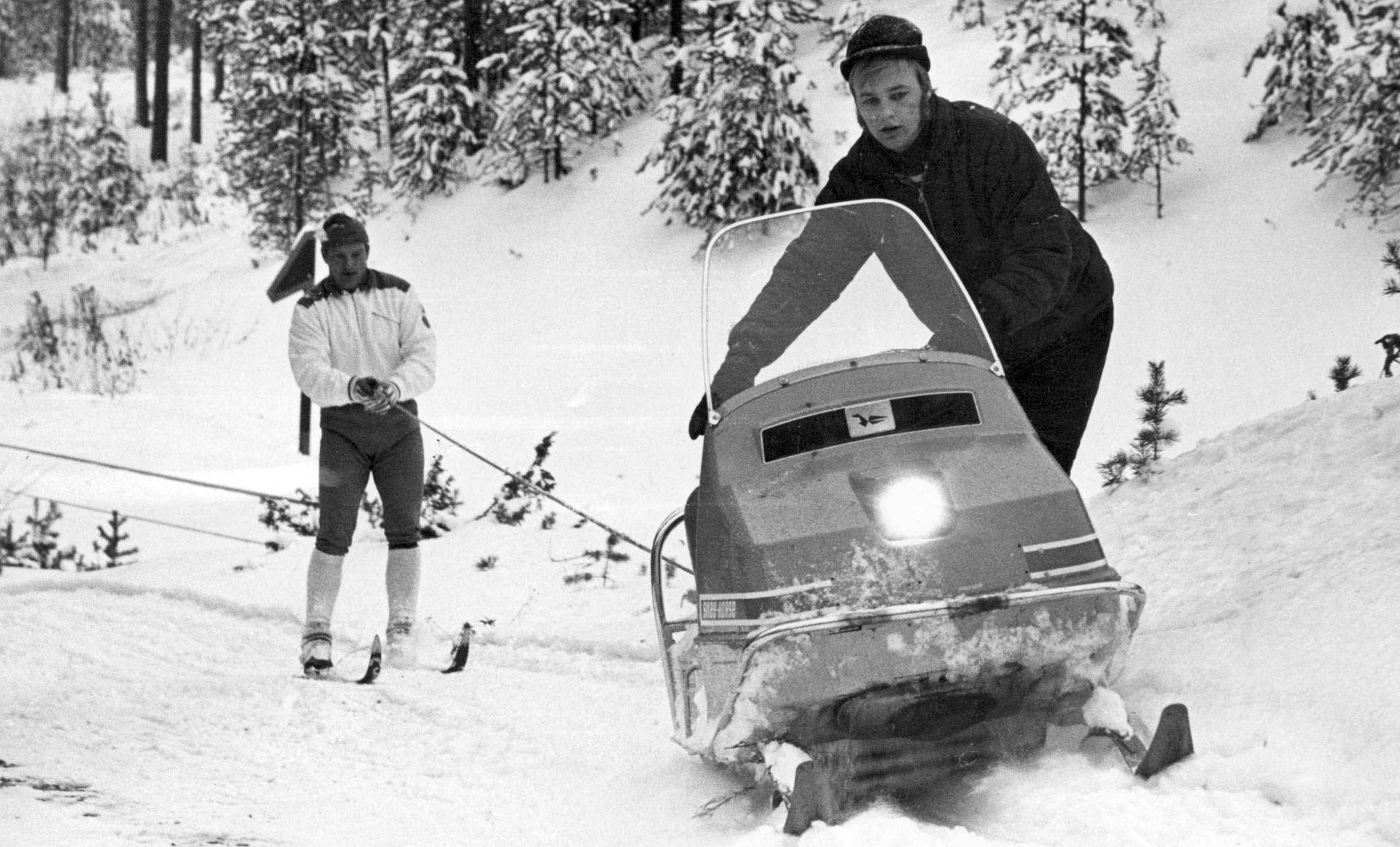
Arto Tiainen in 1970

Arto Tiainen (5 September 1930 – 21 September 1998) was a Finnish cross-country skier. He was born in Sääminki.

== Champion ==
He won two medals at the 1964 Winter Olympics, a silver in the 4 × 10 km relay and a bronze in the 50 km. Additionally, Tianen won two medals at the FIS Nordic World Ski Championships, a silver in 50 km (1966) and a bronze in the 4 × 10 km relay (1958).

== Award ==
Tianen's biggest cross-country skiing success came at the Holmenkollen ski festival, where he won the 50 km event in both 1964 and 1965. For his successes, Tiainen earned the Holmenkollen medal in 1965 (Shared with Bengt Eriksson and Arne Larsen).

== Politics ==
Arto Tiainen was a Social Democratic member of the Finnish Parliament from 22 January 1970 to 22 March 1970.

== Cross-country skiing results ==
All results are sourced from the International Ski Federation (FIS).

=== Olympic Games ===
- 2 medals – (1 silver, 1 bronze)

Year	Age	15 km	30 km	50 km	4 × 10 km relay
1956	25	26	—	—	—
1960	29	—	18	—	—
1964	33	—	13	Bronze	Silver
1968	37	—	16	—	—

=== World Championships ===
- 2 medals – (1 silver, 1 bronze)

Year	Age	15 km	30 km	50 km	4 × 10 km relay
1958	27	12	5	4	Bronze
1962	31	—	—	4	—
1966	35	—	—	Silver	—
