= Kalevi Hämäläinen =

Finnish cross-country skier (1932–2005)

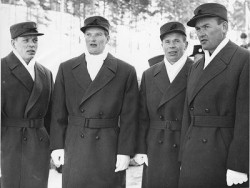

Medal record

Men's cross-country skiing

Representing Finland

Olympic Games
Gold medal – first place	1960 Squaw Valley	50 km

World Championships
Gold medal – first place	1958 Lahti	30 km
Bronze medal – third place	1958 Lahti	4 × 10 km relay
Bronze medal – third place	1962 Zakopane	50 km

Kalevi Hämäläinen (13 December 1932 – 10 January 2005) was a Finnish cross-country skier who competed in the late 1950s and early 1960s. He won the 50 km event at the 1960 Winter Olympics in Squaw Valley. He was born in Juva.

Hämäläinen also won three medals in the FIS Nordic World Ski Championships with a gold in the 30 km (1958), and bronzes in the 4 × 10 km relay (1958) and the 50 km (1962).

== Cross-country skiing results ==
All results are sourced from the International Ski Federation (FIS).

=== Olympic Games ===
- 1 medal – (1 gold)

Year	Age	15 km	30 km	50 km	4 × 10 km relay
1956	23	—	20	—	—
1960	27	—	12	Gold	—
1964	31	—	—	16	—

=== World Championships ===
- 3 medals – (1 gold, 2 bronze)

Year	Age	15 km	30 km	50 km	4 × 10 km relay
1958	25	10	Gold	7	Bronze
1962	29	—	—	Bronze	—
