= Cross-country skiing at the 1956 Winter Olympics – Men's 15 kilometre =

Men's 15kilometre at the VII Olympic Winter Games
- Cross-country skiing
- Venue: Lo Stadio della neve, Cortina
- Date: 30 January 1956
- Competitors: 62 from 20 nations
- Winning time: 49:39

Medalists
1st place, gold medalist(s)		Hallgeir Brenden	Norway
2nd place, silver medalist(s)		Sixten Jernberg	Sweden
3rd place, bronze medalist(s)		Pavel Kolchin	Soviet Union

The men's 15 kilometre cross-country race at the 1956 Winter Olympics was held on 30 January. It was held at the Snow Stadium (Lo Stadio della neve), which was about 2 km (1.2 mi) from Cortina. Sixty-one competitors from twenty countries participated in the event. The Nordic countries of Norway and Sweden took first and second in the form of Hallgeir Brenden of Norway and Sixten Jernberg of Sweden. This was Jernberg's second silver medal of the Games. Soviet skier Pavel Kolchin won his second bronze of the Games.

== Medalists ==
Gold	Hallgeir Brenden; Norway
Silver	Sixten Jernberg; Sweden
Bronze	Pavel Kolchin; Soviet Union

== Results ==
Place	No.	Competitor	Time	Difference*
1	36	Hallgeir Brenden (NOR)	49:39	
2	56	Sixten Jernberg (SWE)	50:14	+0.35
3	41	Pavel Kolchin (URS)	50:17	+0.38
4	48	Veikko Hakulinen (FIN)	50:31	+0.52
5	51	Håkon Brusveen (NOR)	50:36	+0.57
6	25	Martin Stokken (NOR)	50:45	+1.06
7	18	Nikolai Anikin (URS)	50:58	+1.19
8	24	Lennart Larsson (SWE)	51:03	+1.24
9	42	Arvo Viitanen (FIN)	51:10	+1.31
10	49	Vladimir Kuzin (URS)	51:36	+1.57
11	32	Ottavio Compagnoni (ITA)	51:42	+2.03
12	35	Per-Erik Larsson (SWE)	51:44	+2.05
13	59	Ilja Matouš (TCH)	52:04	+2.25
14	13	Veikko Räsänen (FIN)	52:35	+2.56
15	2	Gunnar Samuelsson (SWE)	52:39	+3.00
16	55	Tadeusz Kwapien (POL)	52:45	+3.06
17	53	Federico Deflorian (ITA)	52:48	+3.09
18	10	Minnevali Galiyev (URS)	52:49	+3.10
19	54	Clarence Servold (CAN)	53:34	+3.55
20	26	Jean Mermet (FRA)	53:40	+4.01
20	45	Werner Zwingli (SUI)	53:40	+4.01
22	63	Benoit Carrara (FRA)	53:41	+4.02
23	34	Andrzej Mateja (POL)	53:42	+4.03
24	16	Pompeo Fattor (ITA)	53:45	+4.06
25	1	Innocenzo Chatrian (ITA)	53:46	+4.07
26	5	Arto Tiainen (FIN)	54:11	+4.32
27	50	Kuno Werner (EUA)	54:18	+4.39
28	62	Sepp Schneeberger (AUT)	54:21	+4.42
29	17	Siegfried Weiß (EUA)	54:29	+4.50
30	11	Magnar Ingebrigtsli (NOR)	54:30	+4.51
31	38	Rudi Kopp (EUA)	54:31	+4.52
32	44	Manole Aldescu (ROM)	54:40	+5.01
33	33	Victor Kronig (SUI)	54:43	+5.04
34	19	Josef Rubis (POL)	54:47	+5.08
35	7	Karl Refreider (AUT)	54:51	+5.12
36	20	Josef Prokeš (TCH)	55:05	+5.26
36	21	Michel Rey (SUI)	55:05	+5.26
38	12	Erwin Hari (SUI)	55:06	+5.27
39	31	Hermann Mayr (AUT)	55:51	+6.12
40	30	Enache Constantin (ROM)	56:06	+6.27
41	58	Mack Miller (USA)	56:08	+6.29
42	40	Jaroslav Cardal (TCH)	56:12	+6.33
43	15	Zdravko Hlebanja (YUG)	56:32	+6.53
44	8	Józef Gąsienica-Sobczak (POL)	56:39	+7.00
45	29	Janez Pavčič (YUG)	56:41	+7.02
46	3	Helmut Hagg (EUA)	56:50	+7.11
47	6	Cveto Pavčič (YUG)	56:55	+7.16
48	47	Tatsuo Miyao (JPN)	56:59	+7.20
49	60	Matevz Kordez (YUG)	57:09	+7.30
50	22	Paul Romand (FRA)	57:11	+7.32
51	43	Lawrence Damon (USA)	57:18	+7.39
52	4	Victor Arbez (FRA)	57:38	+7.59
53	52	Dimitri Petrov (BUL)	57:53	+8.14
54	37	Zakharin Grivev (BUL)	58:11	+8.32
55	61	Jon Kristjansson (ISL)	58:23	+8.44
56	14	Maurice Gover (GBR)	58:58	+9.17
57	28	Andrew Morgan (GBR)	59:27	+9.48
58	57	John Moore (GBR)	59:31	+9.52
59	23	Oskar Schulz (AUT)	59:56	+10.17
60	9	Aubrey Fielder (GBR)	59:59	+10.20
61	39	Oddur Petursson (ISL)	1:02.36	+12.57
AC		Georges Gereidi (LIB)		DQ

* - Difference is in minutes and seconds.

== See also ==
- List of IOC country codes
- 1956 Winter Olympics
