= Sture Grahn =

Swedish cross-country skier (1932–2024)

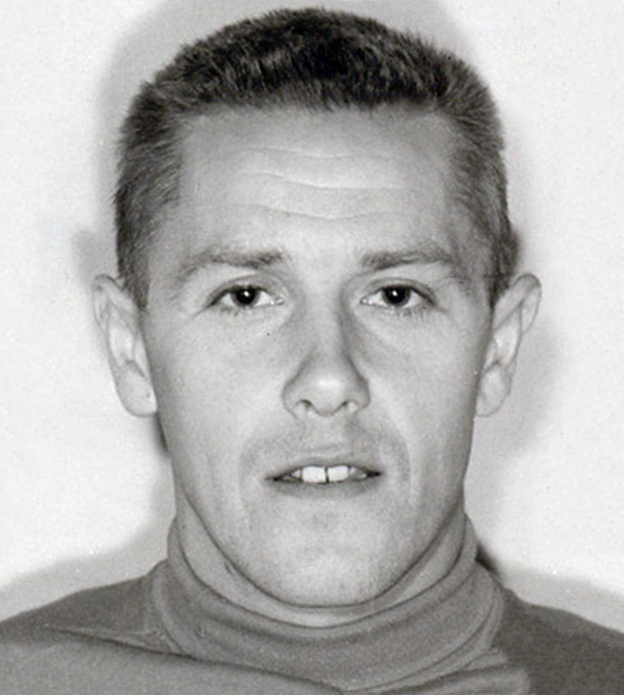
- Grahn in the 1950s

Personal information
- Born: 24 May 1932 Lycksele, Sweden
- Died: 14 August 2024 (aged 92)
- Height: 178 cm (5 ft 10 in)
- Weight: 78 kg (172 lb)

Sport
- Sport: Cross-country skiing
- Club: Lycksele IF
Medal record
Men's cross-country skiing
Representing Sweden
World Championships
| Gold medal – first place | 1958 Lahti | 4 × 10 km relay |
| Gold medal – first place | 1962 Zakopane | 4 × 10 km relay |

Bror Sture Ragnvald Grahn (24 May 1932 – 14 August 2024) was a Swedish cross-country skier. He finished tenth in the 50 km event at the 1956 Winter Olympics and won gold medals in the 4 × 10 km relay at the 1958 and 1962 World Championships. His wife Barbro Martinsson also competed in cross-country skiing at the 1956 Olympics. Grahn died on 14 August 2024, at the age of 92.

== Cross-country skiing results ==
=== Olympic Games ===
| Year | Age | 15 km | 30 km | 50 km | 4 × 10 km relay |
|---|---|---|---|---|---|
| 1956 | 23 | — | — | 10 | — |

=== World Championships ===
- 2 medals – (2 gold)

| Year | Age | 15 km | 30 km | 50 km | 4 × 10 km relay |
|---|---|---|---|---|---|
| 1958 | 25 | 18 | 18 | 12 | Gold |
| 1962 | 29 | — | — | — | Gold |
