= Veini Kontinen =

Finnish cross-country skier

Personal information
- Nationality: Finnish
- Born: 12 February 1928 Mikkeli, Finland
- Died: 21 February 2010 (aged 82) Kuopio, Finland

Sport
- Sport: Cross-country skiing

Veini Kontinen (12 February 1928 – 21 February 2010) was a Finnish cross-country skier. He competed in the men's 50 kilometre event at the 1956 Winter Olympics.

== Cross-country skiing results ==
=== Olympic Games ===
Year	Age	15 km	30 km	50 km	4 × 10 km relay
1956	27	—	—	9	—
