= Antti Sivonen =

Finnish cross-country skier

Personal information
- Nationality: Finnish
- Born: 14 September 1928 Ilomantsi, Finland
- Died: 22 December 2013 (aged 85) Tampere, Finland

Sport
- Sport: Cross-country skiing

Antti Sivonen (14 September 1928 – 22 December 2013) was a Finnish cross-country skier. He competed in the men's 50 kilometre event at the 1956 Winter Olympics.

== Cross-country skiing results ==
=== Olympic Games ===
Year	Age	15 km	30 km	50 km	4 × 10 km relay
1956	27	—	—	8	—
