= List of flag bearers for Finland at the Olympics =

Finland at the Olympics
- IOC code: FIN
- NOC: Finnish Olympic Committee
- Website: www.olympiakomitea.fi (in Finnish and English)
- Medals: Gold 146 Silver 151 Bronze 189 Total 486

Summer appearances
- 1908; 1912; 1920; 1924; 1928; 1932; 1936; 1948; 1952; 1956; 1960; 1964; 1968; 1972; 1976; 1980; 1984; 1988; 1992; 1996; 2000; 2004; 2008; 2012; 2016; 2020; 2024

Winter appearances
- 1924; 1928; 1932; 1936; 1948; 1952; 1956; 1960; 1964; 1968; 1972; 1976; 1980; 1984; 1988; 1992; 1994; 1998; 2002; 2006; 2010; 2014; 2018; 2022; 2026

Other related appearances
- 1906 Intercalated Games

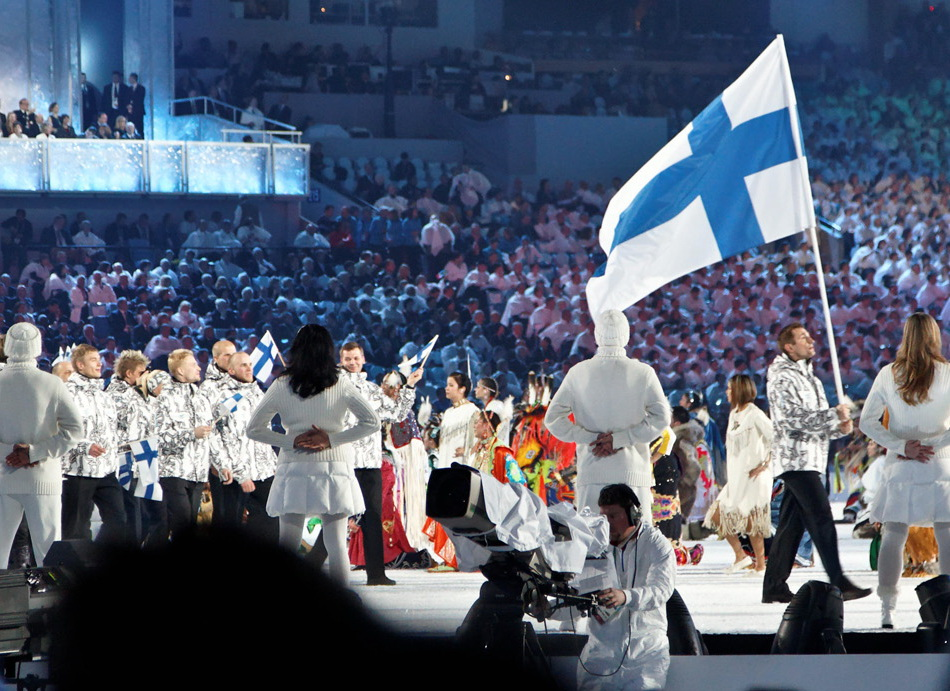
2010 Winter Olympics national flag bearers

This is a list of flag bearers who have represented Finland at the Olympics.

Flag bearers carry the national flag of their country at the opening ceremony of the Olympic Games.

| # | Event year | Season | Flag bearer | Sport |
|---|---|---|---|---|
| 1 | 1908 | Summer | Bruno Zilliacus^{a} | Athletics |
| 2 | 1912 | Summer | Eino Saastamoinen | Artistic gymnastics |
| 3 | 1920 | Summer | Emil Hagelberg | Modern pentathlon |
| 4 | 1924 | Winter | Armas Palmros | Nordic combined / ski jumping |
| 5 | 1924 | Summer | Elmer Niklander | Athletics |
| 6 | 1928 | Winter | Esko Järvinen | Nordic combined / ski jumping |
| 7 | 1928 | Summer | Akilles Järvinen | Athletics |
| 8 | 1932 | Winter | Ossi Blomqvist | Speed skating |
| 9 | 1932 | Summer | Akilles Järvinen | Athletics |
| 10 | 1936 | Winter | Sulo Nurmela | Cross-country skiing |
| 11 | 1936 | Summer | Akilles Järvinen | Athletics |
| 12 | 1948 | Winter | Pekka Vanninen | Cross-country skiing |
| 13 | 1948 | Summer | Hannes Sonck | Athletics |
| 14 | 1952 | Winter | Heikki Hasu | Nordic combined |
| 15 | 1952 | Summer | Väinö Suvivuo | Athletics |
| 16 | 1956 | Winter | Antti Hyvärinen | Ski jumping |
| 17 | 1956 | Equestrian | Erkki Estola | Equestrian (did not compete) |
| 18 | 1956 | Summer | Eeles Landström | Athletics |
| 19 | 1960 | Winter | Paavo Korhonen | Nordic combined |
| 20 | 1960 | Summer | Eeles Landström | Athletics |
| 21 | 1964 | Winter | Veikko Hakulinen | Biathlon |
| 22 | 1964 | Summer | Eugen Ekman | Artistic gymnastics |
| 23 | 1968 | Winter | Veikko Kankkonen | Ski jumping |
| 24 | 1968 | Summer | Pentti Linnosvuo | Shooting sport |
| 25 | 1972 | Winter | Juha Mieto | Cross-country skiing |
| 26 | 1972 | Summer | Ilkka Nummisto | Canoe racing |
| 27 | 1976 | Winter | Rauno Miettinen | Nordic combined |
| 28 | 1976 | Summer | Lasse Virén | Athletics |
| 29 | 1980 | Winter | Heikki Ikola | Biathlon |
| 30 | 1980 | Summer | Peter Tallberg | Sailing |
| 31 | 1984 | Winter | Jorma Valtonen | Ice hockey |
| 32 | 1984 | Summer | Esko Rechardt | Sailing |
| 33 | 1988 | Winter | Pertti Niittylä | Speed skating |
| 34 | 1988 | Summer | Jouko Salomäki | Greco-Roman wrestling |
| 35 | 1992 | Winter | Timo Blomqvist | Ice hockey |
| 36 | 1992 | Summer | Harri Koskela | Greco-Roman wrestling |
| 37 | 1994 | Winter | Marja-Liisa Kirvesniemi | Cross-country skiing |
| 38 | 1996 | Summer | Mikko Kolehmainen | Canoe racing |
| 39 | 1998 | Winter | Janne Ahonen | Ski jumping |
| 40 | 2000 | Summer | Olli-Pekka Karjalainen | Athletics |
| 41 | 2002 | Winter | Toni Nieminen | Ski jumping |
| 42 | 2004 | Summer | Thomas Johanson | Sailing |
| 43 | 2006 | Winter | Janne Lahtela | Freestyle skiing |
| 44 | 2008 | Summer | Juha Hirvi | Shooting sports |
| 45 | 2010 | Winter | Ville Peltonen | Ice hockey |
| 46 | 2012 | Summer | Hanna-Maria Seppälä | Swimming |
| 47 | 2014 | Winter | Enni Rukajärvi | Snowboarding |
| 48 | 2016 | Summer | Tuuli Petäjä-Sirén | Sailing |
| 49 | 2018 | Winter | Janne Ahonen | Ski jumping |
| 50 | 2020 | Summer | Satu Mäkelä-Nummela | Shooting sports |
| 50 | 2020 | Summer | Ari-Pekka Liukkonen | Swimming |
| 51 | 2022 | Winter | Valtteri Filppula | Ice hockey |
| 52 | 2024 | Summer | Eetu Kallioinen | Shooting sports |
| 52 | 2024 | Summer | Sinem Kurtbay | Sailing |

- ^{^a} Russian officials told Finland that, because they were a part of Russia at the time, they were not allowed to fly their own flag. They then refused to fly the Russian flag, but still joined the parade.

== See also ==
- Finland at the Olympics
