= Magnar Ingebrigtsli =

Magnar Ingebrigtsli (11 November 1932 – 10 September 2001) was a Norwegian cross-country skier and biathlete.

He was born in Rindal Municipality, and represented IK Rindals-Troll. He competed at the 1956 Winter Olympics in Cortina d'Ampezzo, where he placed 30th in the 15 km cross-country skiing.

He became Norwegian champion in biathlon in 1961.

== Cross-country skiing results ==
=== Olympic Games ===
Year	Age	15 km	30 km	50 km	4 × 10 km relay
1956	23	—	30	—	—
