= Olavi Latsa =

Finnish cross-country skier

Personal information
- Nationality: Finnish
- Born: 19 July 1929 Salmi, Finland
- Died: 4 March 1988 (aged 58) Uusimaa, Finland

Sport
- Sport: Cross-country skiing

Olavi Latsa (19 July 1929 – 4 March 1988) was a Finnish cross-country skier. He competed in the men's 30 kilometre event at the 1956 Winter Olympics.

== Cross-country skiing results ==
=== Olympic Games ===
Year	Age	15 km	30 km	50 km	4 × 10 km relay
1956	26	—	9	—	—
