= Per-Erik Larsson =

Swedish cross-country skier (1929–2008)

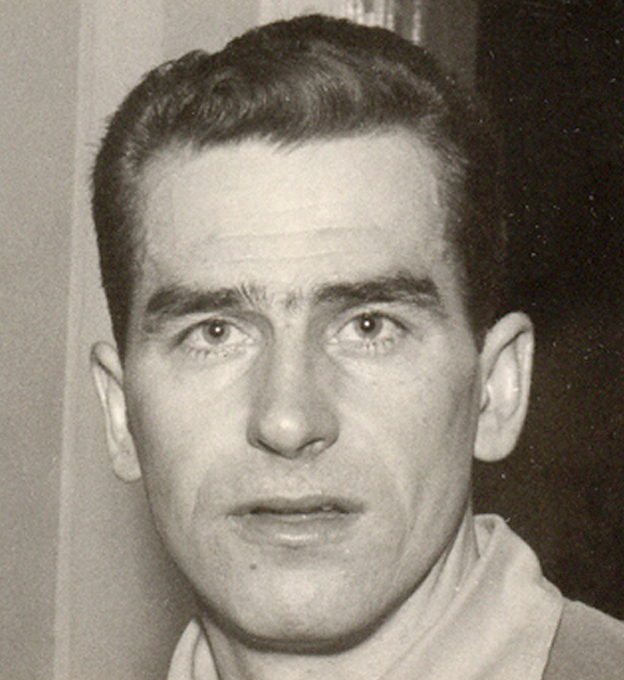
- Per-Erik Larsson by the 1950s

Personal information
- Born: 3 May 1929 Oxberg, Mora, Sweden
- Died: 31 May 2008 (aged 79) Mora, Sweden

Sport
- Sport: Cross-country skiing
- Club: IFK Mora; Oxbergs IF, Mora
Medal record
Men's cross-country skiing
Representing Sweden
Olympic Games
Bronze medal – third place	1956 Cortina d'Ampezzo	4 × 10 km relay
World Championships
Gold medal – first place	1958 Lahti	4 × 10 km relay
Bronze medal – third place	1954 Falun	4 × 10 km relay

Per-Erik Larsson (3 May 1929 – 31 May 2008) was a Swedish cross-country skier who competed at the 1956 and 1960 Olympics. He won a bronze medal in the 4 × 10 km relay and finished seventh in the individual 30 km race in 1956. In the 15 km event he placed 12th and 17th in 1956 and 1960, respectively.

Larsson won two 4 × 10 km relay medals at the Nordic skiing World Championships with a gold in 1958 and a bronze in 1954.

== Cross-country skiing results ==
=== Olympic Games ===
- 1 medal – (1 bronze)

Year	Age	15 km	30 km	50 km	4 × 10 km relay
1956	26	12	7	—	Bronze
1960	30	17	—	—	—

=== World Championships ===
- 2 medals – (1 gold, 1 bronze)

Year	Age	15 km	30 km	50 km	4 × 10 km relay
1954	24	—	—	—	Bronze
1958	28	8	—	9	Gold
