= Cross-country skiing at the 1964 Winter Olympics – Men's 50 kilometre =

Olympic cross-country skiing event

Men's 50km at the IX Olympic Winter Games
- Cross-country skiing
- Venue: Cross Country Skiing Stadium
- Date: 5 February 1964
- Competitors: 41 from 14 nations
- Winning time: 2-43:52.6

Medalists
1st place, gold medalist(s)		Sixten Jernberg	Sweden
2nd place, silver medalist(s)		Assar Rönnlund	Sweden
3rd place, bronze medalist(s)		Arto Tiainen	Finland

The Men's 50 kilometre cross-country skiing event was part of the cross-country skiing programme at the 1964 Winter Olympics, in Innsbruck, Austria. The competition was held on 5 February 1964, at the Cross Country Skiing Stadium.

== Results ==
Rank	Name	Country	Time
1	Sixten Jernberg	Sweden	2-43:52.6
2	Assar Rönnlund	Sweden	2-44:58.2
3	Arto Tiainen	Finland	2-45:30.4
4	Janne Stefansson	Sweden	2-45:36.6
5	Sverre Stensheim	Norway	2-45:47.2
6	Harald Grønningen	Norway	2-47:03.6
7	Einar Østby	Norway	2-47:20.6
8	Ole Ellefsæter	Norway	2-47:45.8
9	Eero Mäntyranta	Finland	2-47:47.1
10	Melcher Risberg	Sweden	2-48:03.0
11	Igor Voronchikhin	Soviet Union	2-49:21.7
12	Bayazit Gizatullin	Soviet Union	2-51:02.4
13	Livio Stuffer	Italy	2-51:04.7
14	Aleksandr Gubin	Soviet Union	2-51:39.7
15	Lauri Bergqvist	Finland	2-52:08.0
16	Kalevi Hämäläinen	Finland	2-52:22.3
17	Ivan Lyubimov	Soviet Union	2-52:28.1
18	Eugenio Mayer	Italy	2-53:21.3
19	Franco Manfroi	Italy	2-53:56.5
20	Alois Kälin	Switzerland	2-56:30.5
21	Andreas Janc	Austria	2-58:43.8
22	Štefan Harvan	Czechoslovakia	2-59:33.3
23	Ladislav Hrubý	Czechoslovakia	3-00:35.4
24	Siegfried Weiß	United Team of Germany	3-00:43.0
25	Stefan Mitkov	Bulgaria	3-01:13.7
26	Alphonse Baume	Switzerland	3-03:49.1
27	Kazuo Sato	Japan	3-03:57.9
28	Larry Damon	United States	3-05:06.4
29	Franz Kälin	Switzerland	3-06:09.3
30	Herbert Steinbeißer	United Team of Germany	3-06:52.2
31	Georges Dubois	Switzerland	3-07:21.8
32	Borislav Ochushki	Bulgaria	3-08:18.7
33	Hermann Mayr	Austria	3-08:48.6
34	Dick Taylor	United States	3-09:58.3
35	Hidezo Takahashi	Japan	3-14:31.4
AC	Angelo Genuin	Italy	DNF
AC	Eric Luoma	Canada	DNF
AC	Rudolf Dannhauer	United Team of Germany	DNF
AC	Franz Portmann	Canada	DNF
AC	Yang Yong-ok	South Korea	DNF
AC	Chogoro Yahata	Japan	DNF
