= Larry Damon =

American cross-country skier (1933–2024)

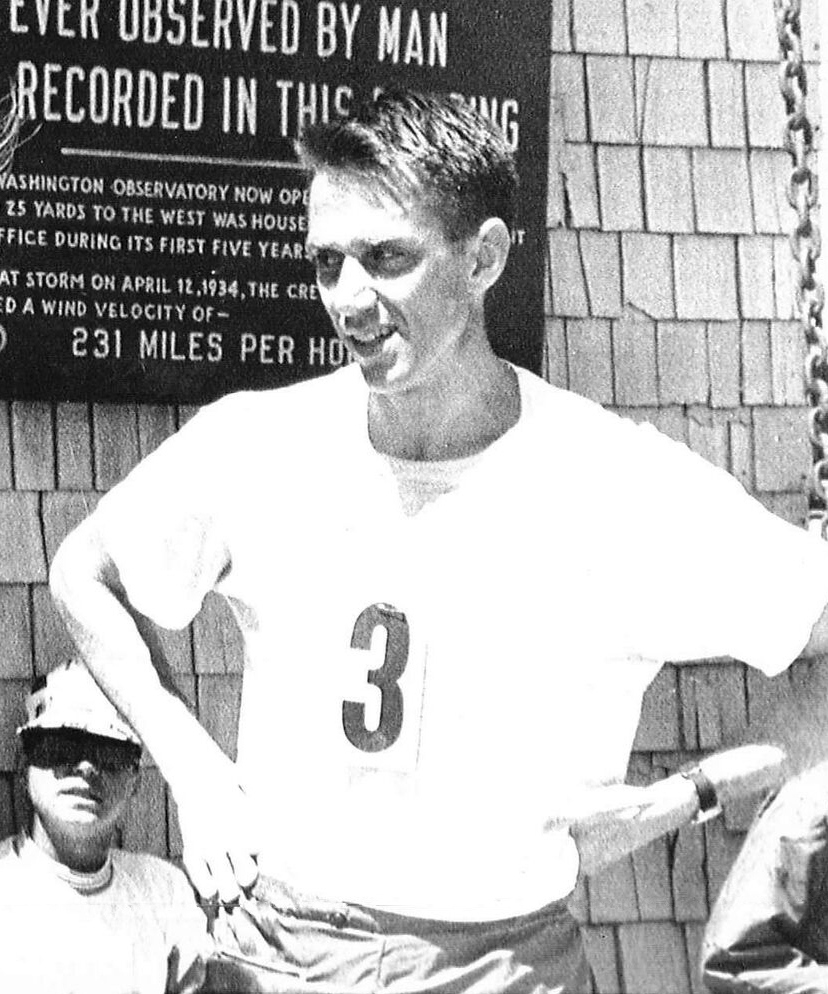
- Damon in 1970

Personal information
- Born: December 8, 1933 Burlington, Vermont, U.S.
- Died: March 15, 2024 (aged 90) Winooski, Vermont, U.S.
- Height: 1.8 m (5 ft 11 in)

Skiing career
- Sport: Alpine skiing
- Club: UVM Outing Club
- Retired: 1970
- Disciplines: Cross-country skiing, Biathlon

Olympics
- Teams: 4 – (1956–Cross Country, 1960–Biathlon, 1964–Cross Country, 1968–Cross Country)
- Medals: 0
Medal record
Representing the United States
US Championships
Gold medal – first place	1961	15 km cross-country ski
Gold medal – first place	1961	30 km cross-country ski

Lawrence Snow Damon (December 8, 1933 – March 15, 2024) was an American cross-country skier and biathlete who competed in the 1956, 1960, 1964 and 1968 Olympics.

== Early life ==
Born on December 8, 1933 in Burlington, Vermont, Damon attended Burlington High School where he was a four event skier.

== Career ==
- 1951 won the State Slalom Championship and placed second in the Cross-country Championship.
- 1952–1955 won the first NCAA Cross-country Ski Championship for UVM.
- 1956 placed 51st in the 15 km cross-country ski at the 1956 Olympics and Men's 4x10 km Cross-country Ski Relay, ranked 12th with personal time in the 3rd leg of 0:37:27 and total team time of 2:32:04. Relay teammates were Ted Farwell, Mack Miller and Marvin Crawford.
- 1958–1959 Competes for the US Military Biathlon teams.
- 1959 won pre-Olympic North American Biathlon.
- 1960 placed 24th in the 20 km biathlon at the 1960 Olympics.
- 1961 won US Championships in 15 km Cross-country Ski and 30 km Cross-country Ski.
- 1962 finished 10th in the 1962 Boston Marathon with a time of 2:34:05.
- 1964 placed 46th in the 30 km and 28th in the 50 km cross-country Ski at the 1964 Olympics.
- 1968 placed 55th in the 15 km and 32nd in the 50 km Cross-country ski at the 1968 Olympics.

== Publicity press and promotions ==
Damon was inducted into the Vermont Ski and Snowboard Museum Hall of Fame in 2010.

== Personal life and death ==
Damon graduated from the University of Vermont in 1955. After the 1956 Olympics, he joined the U.S. Army where he competed in biathlon. After marrying Norwegian Olympic cross-country skier Babben Enger he briefly lived in Norway, but in 1970 settled in Vermont to work as a ski instructor at the Trapp Family Lodge.

Damon died in Winooski, Vermont on March 15, 2024, at the age of 90.
