= Okuliar =

Okuliar (feminine: Okuliarová) and Okuliár (feminine: Okuliárová) are Slovak surnames. Notable people with the surnames include:

- Emil Okuliár (born 1931), Czech cross-country skier
- Oliver Okuliar (born 2000), Slovak ice hockey player
