= Cross-country skiing at the 1960 Winter Olympics – Men's 15 kilometre =

Men's 15km at the VIII Olympic Winter Games
- Cross-country skiing
- Venue: McKinney Creek Stadium
- Date: February 23, 1960
- Competitors: 54 from 19 nations
- Winning time: 51:55.5

Medalists
1st place, gold medalist(s)		Håkon Brusveen	Norway
2nd place, silver medalist(s)		Sixten Jernberg	Sweden
3rd place, bronze medalist(s)		Veikko Hakulinen	Finland

The 15 kilometre cross-country skiing event was part of the cross-country skiing programme at the 1960 Winter Olympics, in Squaw Valley, California, United States. It was the second appearance of the event at its length of 15 km. The competition was held on Tuesday, February 23, 1960, at the McKinney Creek Stadium.

Håkon Brusveen of Norway won his only Olympic gold medal, 3 seconds ahead of the 30 km gold medallist, Sixten Jernberg. Defending Olympic champion and fellow Norwegian, Hallgeir Brenden finished 12th.

== Results ==
Rank	Name	Country	Time
1	Håkon Brusveen	Norway	51:55.5
2	Sixten Jernberg	Sweden	51:58.6
3	Veikko Hakulinen	Finland	52:03.0
4	Gennady Vaganov	Soviet Union	52:18.0
4	Einar Østby	Norway	52:18.0
6	Eero Mäntyranta	Finland	52:40.6
7	Janne Stefansson	Sweden	52:41.0
8	Rolf Rämgård	Sweden	52:47.3
9	Marcello De Dorigo	Italy	52:53.5
10	Nikolay Anikin	Soviet Union	52:55.0
11	Harald Grønningen	Norway	53:02.2
12	Hallgeir Brenden	Norway	53:10.3
13	Väinö Huhtala	Finland	53:11.5
14	Giulio Deflorian	Italy	53:24.1
15	Aleksandr Gubin	Soviet Union	53:29.1
16	Pavel Morshchinin	Soviet Union	53:36.6
17	Per-Erik Larsson	Sweden	53:49.8
18	Józef Rysula	Poland	54:13.3
19	Pompeo Fattor	Italy	54:31.1
20	Giuseppe Steiner	Italy	54:42.3
21	Jean Mermet	France	54:44.5
22	Mack Miller	United States	54:49.0
23	Toimi Alatalo	Finland	54:52.7
24	Kuno Werner	United Team of Germany	55:25.6
25	Benoît Carrara	France	55:38.5
26	Victor Arbez	France	55:44.1
27	Alphonse Baume	Switzerland	55:58.9
28	Kazimierz Zelek	Poland	55:59.4
29	René Mandrillon	France	56:01.5
30	Kazuo Sato	Japan	56:15.0
31	Lorenz Possa	Switzerland	56:30.1
32	Enno Röder	United Team of Germany	56:54.4
33	Stefan Mitkov	Bulgaria	56:55.4
34	Pál Sajgó	Hungary	57:02.9
35	Clarence Servold	Canada	57:04.7
36	Rudolf Čillík	Czechoslovakia	57:23.7
37	Marcel Huguenin	Switzerland	57:36.7
38	Werner Haase	United Team of Germany	57:40.3
39	Konrad Hischier	Switzerland	57:43.9
40	Takashi Matsuhashi	Japan	57:49.1
41	Józef Gut Misiaga	Poland	58:03.6
42	Siegfried Weiß	United Team of Germany	58:04.6
43	Andrzej Mateja	Poland	58:09.1
44	John Moore	Great Britain	58:35.0
45	Eiji Kurita	Japan	58:57.0
46	Peter Lahdenpera	United States	59:13.0
47	Irvin Servold	Canada	59:42.0
48	Olavi Hirvonen	United States	1:00:38.6
49	Andrew Morgan	Great Britain	1:01:32.9
50	Charlie Akers	United States	1:02:35.7
51	Richard Walpole	Australia	1:06:48.3
52	Norman Shutt	Great Britain	1:07:34.0
53	Francisco Jerman	Argentina	1:09:59.3
54	Kim Ha-yun	South Korea	1:15:26.5
