= Valentina Tsaryova =

Soviet cross-country skier

Medal record

Women's cross-country skiing

Representing Soviet Union

World Championships
Gold medal – first place	1954 Falun	3 × 5 km relay

Valentina Georgiyevna Tsaryova (Russian: Валенти́на Гео́ргиевна Царёва; 5 December 1926 – 12 May 2015) was a Soviet cross-country skier who competed in the 1950s. She earned a gold medal in the 3x5 km at the 1954 FIS Nordic World Ski Championships in Falun.

== Cross-country skiing results ==
=== World Championships ===
- 1 medal – (1 gold)

Year	Age	10 km	3 × 5 km relay
1954	27	—	Gold
