= Cross-country skiing at the 1960 Winter Olympics – Men's 50 kilometre =

Men's 50 km at the VIII Olympic Winter Games
- Cross-country skiing
- Venue: McKinney Creek Stadium
- Date: February 27, 1960
- Competitors: 39 from 15 nations
- Winning time: 2:59:06.3

Medalists
1st place, gold medalist(s)		Kalevi Hämäläinen	Finland
2nd place, silver medalist(s)		Veikko Hakulinen	Finland
3rd place, bronze medalist(s)		Rolf Rämgård	Sweden

The 50 kilometre cross-country skiing event was part of the cross-country skiing programme at the 1960 Winter Olympics, in Squaw Valley, California, United States. It was the fifth appearance of the event at its length of 30 km. The competition was held on Saturday, February 27, 1960 at the McKinney Creek Stadium.

Kalevi Hämäläinen of Finland won the gold medal ahead of fellow Finn Veikko Hakulinen. Defending Olympic champion Sixten Jernberg from Sweden finished 5th. Thirty nine competitors were due to start but eight did not make the starting line. Of the top 14, only 2 were not Nordic.

== Results ==
Rank	Name	Country	Time
1	Kalevi Hämäläinen	Finland	2:59:06.3
2	Veikko Hakulinen	Finland	2:59:26.7
3	Rolf Rämgård	Sweden	3:02:46.7
4	Lennart Larsson	Sweden	3:03:27.9
5	Sixten Jernberg	Sweden	3:05:18.0
6	Pentti Pelkonen	Finland	3:05:24.5
7	Gennady Vaganov	Soviet Union	3:05:27.6
8	Veikko Räsänen	Finland	3:06:04.4
9	Hallgeir Brenden	Norway	3:08:23.0
10	Sverre Stensheim	Norway	3:08:51.5
11	Oddmund Jensen	Norway	3:09:16.2
12	Assar Rönnlund	Sweden	3:09:46.6
13	Nikolay Anikin	Soviet Union	3:10:13.9
14	Harald Grønningen	Norway	3:11:17.1
15	Aleksey Kuznetsov	Soviet Union	3:11:47.0
16	Federico Deflorian	Italy	3:16:23.6
17	Mack Miller	United States	3:17:23.2
18	Livio Stuffer	Italy	3:20:43.4
19	Ivan Lyubimov	Soviet Union	3:25:06.4
20	Helmut Hagg	United Team of Germany	3:25:14.6
21	Antonio Schenatti	Italy	3:26:32.2
22	Stefan Mitkov	Bulgaria	3:26:32.5
23	Rudolf Dannhauer	United Team of Germany	3:27:54.6
24	Siegfried Weiß	United Team of Germany	3:28:29.1
25	Alfredo Dibona	Italy	3:33:31.6
26	Olavi Hirvonen	United States	3:36:37.8
27	Eiji Kurita	Japan	3:38:40.6
28	Egon Fleischmann	United Team of Germany	3:38:53.6
29	Leo Massa	United States	3:41:08.2
30	John Moore	Great Britain	3:43:15.2
31	Theodore Farwell Jr.	United States	3:49:56.6
	Clarence Servold	Canada	DNS
	Norman Shutt	Great Britain	DNS
	Andrew Morgan	Great Britain	DNS
	Pál Sajgó	Hungary	DNS
	Kazuo Sato	Japan	DNS
	Andrzej Mateja	Poland	DNS
	Rudolf Čillík	Czechoslovakia	DNS
	Fritz Kocher	Switzerland	DNS
