= Pirkko Korkee =

Finnish cross-country skier (1927–2024)

Medal record

Women's cross-country skiing

Representing Finland

World Championships
Silver medal – second place	1958 Lahti	3 × 5 km relay

Pirkko Maria Helena Korkee (25 March 1927 – 12 April 2024) was a Finnish cross-country skier who competed in the 1950s. She earned a silver medal in the 3 × 5 km relay at the 1958 FIS Nordic World Ski Championships in Lahti. Korkee died on 12 April 2024, at the age of 97.

== Cross-country skiing results ==
=== World Championships ===
- 1 medal – (1 silver)

Year	Age	10 km	3 × 5 km relay
1958	30	13	Silver
