= Lennart Larsson (cross-country skier) =

Swedish cross-country skier (1930–2021)

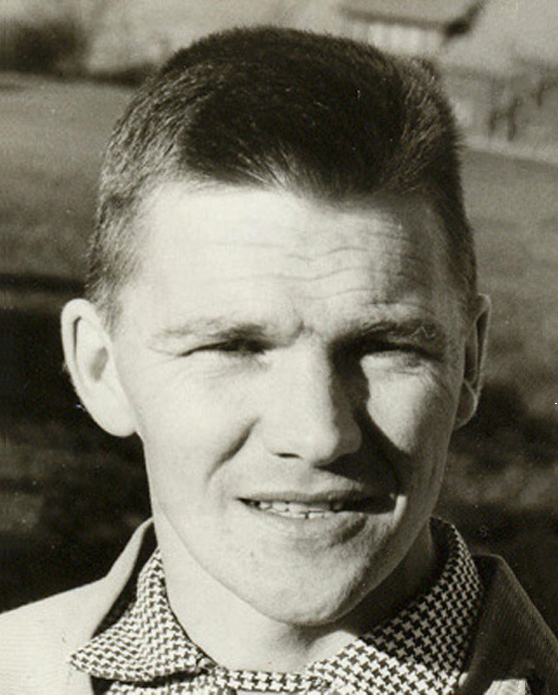
- Lennart Larsson in the 1950s

Personal information
- Born: 7 February 1930 Granbergsträsk, Skellefteå, Sweden
- Died: 26 March 2021 (aged 91)

Sport
- Sport: Cross-country skiing
- Club: SK Järven, Jörn, Skellefteå
Medal record
Men's cross-country skiing
Representing Sweden
Olympic Games
Bronze medal – third place	1956 Cortina d'Ampezzo	4 × 10 km relay
World Championships
Gold medal – first place	1958 Lahti	4 × 10 km relay

Nils Olov Lennart ”Lill-Järven" Larsson (7 February 1930 – 26 March 2021) was a Swedish cross-country skier and coach. He competed in the 4 × 10 km relay at the 1956 and 1960 Olympics and won a bronze medal in 1956, finishing fourth in 1960; in 1960 he also placed fourth and fifth in the individual 30 and 50 km events. Larsson won the 4 × 10 km relay at the 1958 FIS Nordic World Ski Championships in Lahti.

Larsson got his nickname Lill-Järven (Little Wolverine) from his club SK Järven. Between 1949 and 1966 he won 74 races out of 394, finishing within the podium 188 times. During his last competitive season of 1965/66 he studied at Bosön Sport Folkhögskola, and later in 1971–73 received a diploma of physical education teacher from the Swedish School of Sport and Health Sciences in Stockholm. He coached skiers in Älvsbyn in 1973–78 and in the 1980s at Lycksele Ski School. He also prepared the Swedish national skiing team for all Winter Olympics from 1968 to 1980 and for the World Championships of 1970, 1978, and 1982. Larsson died on 26 March 2021 at the age of 91.

== Cross-country skiing results ==
All results are sourced from the International Ski Federation (FIS).

=== Olympic Games ===
- 1 medal – (1 bronze)

Year	Age	15 km	30 km	50 km	4 × 10 km relay
1956	26	8	8	—	Bronze
1960	30	—	5	4	4

=== World Championships ===
- 1 medal – (1 gold)

Year	Age	15 km	30 km	50 km	4 × 10 km relay
1958	28	14	—	15	Gold
