= Pavel Morshchinin =

Russian cross-country skier

Personal information
- Nationality: Russian
- Born: 22 January 1933 Krasnoye Selo, Russian SFSR, Soviet Union
- Died: 30 May 2009 (aged 76) Krasnoye Selo, Russia

Sport
- Sport: Cross-country skiing

Pavel Morshchinin (22 January 1933 – 30 May 2009) was a Russian cross-country skier. He competed in the men's 15 kilometre event at the 1960 Winter Olympics.
