= Armand Genoud =

Swiss cross-country skier

Personal information
- Nationality: Swiss
- Born: 6 July 1930 (age 94)

Sport
- Sport: Cross-country skiing

Armand Genoud (born 6 July 1930) is a Swiss cross-country skier. He competed in the men's 30 kilometre event at the 1956 Winter Olympics.
