= Jorma Kortelainen =

Finnish cross-country skier and rower

Medal record

Men's cross-country skiing

Representing Finland

Olympic Games
Silver medal – second place	1956 Cortina d'Ampezzo	4 × 10 km relay

Jorma Aksel Kortelainen (17 December 1932 – 27 December 2012) was a Finnish cross-country skier and rower who competed in the 1950s.

Kortelainen was born in Pyhäselkä. He won a silver medal at the 1956 Winter Olympics in Cortina d'Ampezzo in the 4 × 10 km relay. He was also a successful rower who took part at the 1960 Summer Olympics in Rome.

Kortelainen died in Jyväskylä, at the age of 80, as a result of sepsis while being treated at the local hospital.

== Cross-country skiing results ==
=== Olympic Games ===
- 1 medal – (1 silver)

Year	Age	15 km	30 km	50 km	4 × 10 km relay
1956	23	—	—	—	Silver
