= Richard Walpole (skier) =

Australian cross-country skier (born 1927)

Personal information
- Nationality: Australian
- Born: 10 December 1927 (age 98)

Sport
- Sport: Cross-country skiing

Thomas Richard Walpole (born 10 December 1927) is an Australian former cross-country skier. He competed in the men's 15 kilometre event at the 1960 Winter Olympics.
