= Sverre Stenersen =

Norwegian skier

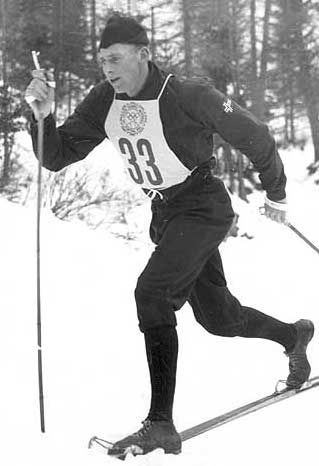
- Stenersen at the 1956 Olympics

Personal information
- Born: 18 June 1926 Målselv, Norway
- Died: 17 December 2005 (aged 79) Målselv, Norway

Sport
- Sport: Nordic combined
- Club: Målselv IL
Medal record
Men's Nordic combined
Representing Norway
Olympic Games
Bronze medal – third place	1952 Oslo	Individual
Gold medal – first place	1956 Cortina d'Ampezzo	Individual
World Championships
Gold medal – first place	1954 Falun	Individual
Silver medal – second place	1958 Lahti	Individual

Sverre Stenersen (18 June 1926 – 17 December 2005) was a Norwegian Nordic combined skier who dominated the event throughout the 1950s. His biggest triumphs were winning individual gold medals at the 1954 World Championships and 1956 Olympics. He also won a bronze at the 1952 Olympics and a silver at the 1958 World Championships. Stenersen won the Nordic combined event at the national championships in 1954–58 and at the Holmenkollen ski festival in 1955, 1956 and 1959. In 1955 he received the Holmenkollen medal, shared with King Haakon VII, Hallgeir Brenden, and Veikko Hakulinen.

Stenersen was born on a small farm in Målselv Municipality. In the late 1940s, seeking better training conditions, he moved to the Oslo area and worked there as a lumberjack to earn a living. He retired after placing seventh at the 1960 Winter Olympics and for several years ran a sport store in Målselv. After that he served as secretary for culture and sport in his municipality until retiring by age.

== Cross-country skiing results ==
=== Olympic Games ===
Year	Age	18 km	50 km	4 × 10 km relay
1952	25	27	—	—

=== World Championships ===
Year	Age	15 km	30 km	50 km	4 × 10 km relay
1954	27	40	—	—	—
