= Zakharin Grivev =

Bulgarian cross-country skier (born 1931)

Zakharin Mihailov Grivev (Bulgarian: Захарин Михайлов Гривев) (born 21 January 1931) is a Bulgarian cross-country skier, who participated in the 1956 Winter Olympics in Cortina d'Ampezzo.

== Biography ==
Grivev participated in the 15 and 30 km cross country events at the 1956 Winter Olympics in Cortina d'Ampezzo. He finished 54th of 62 participants in the 15 km event and 44th of 54 participants in the 30 km event.
