= Anna-Lisa Eriksson =

Swedish cross-country skier (1928–2012)

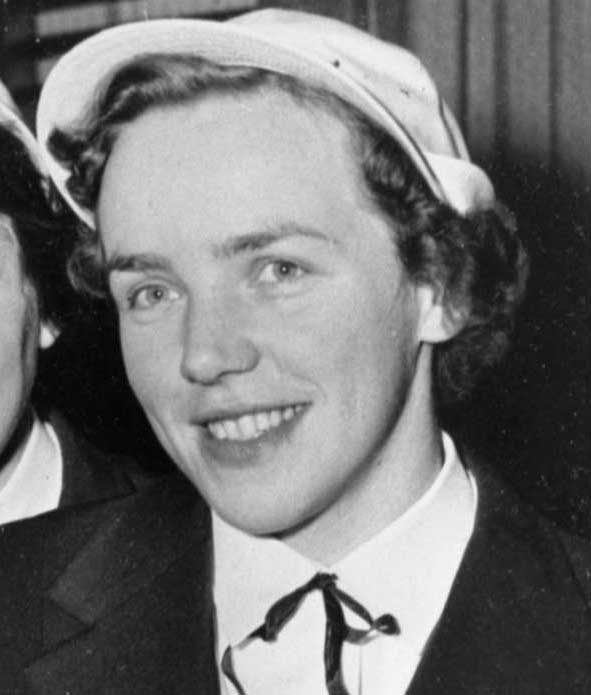
- Anna-Lisa Eriksson in the 1950's

Personal information
- Born: 21 June 1928 Selånger, Sweden
- Died: 26 May 2012 (aged 83) Härnösand, Sweden

Sport
- Sport: Cross-country skiing
- Club: Selånger Skidklubb
Medal record
Representing Sweden
Olympic Games
| Bronze medal – third place | 1956 Cortina d'Ampezzo | 3 × 5 km relay |
World Championships
| Bronze medal – third place | 1954 Falun | 3 × 5 km relay |

Anna-Lisa Eriksson (21 June 1928 – 26 May 2012) was a Swedish cross-country skier who won a bronze medal in the 3 × 5 km relay at the 1956 Winter Olympics in Cortina d'Ampezzo.

Eriksson won another bronze medal in the 3 × 5 km relay at the 1954 FIS Nordic World Ski Championships in Falun. She also won the 10 km event at the Holmenkollen ski festival in 1957.

== Cross-country skiing results ==
=== Olympic Games ===
- 1 medal – (1 bronze)

| Year | Age | 10 km | 3 × 5 km relay |
|---|---|---|---|
| 1956 | 27 | 13 | Bronze |

=== World Championships ===
- 1 medal – (1 bronze)

| Year | Age | 10 km | 3 × 5 km relay |
|---|---|---|---|
| 1954 | 25 | — | Bronze |
| 1958 | 29 | 20 | — |
