= Dimitri Petrov (cross-country skier) =

Bulgarian cross-country skier (1932–2020)

Personal information
- Nationality: Bulgarian
- Born: 10 February 1932
- Died: September 2020 (aged 88)

Sport
- Sport: Cross-country skiing

Dimitri Petrov (10 February 1932 – September 2020) was a Bulgarian cross-country skier. He competed in the men's 15 kilometre event at the 1956 Winter Olympics. Petrov died in September 2020, at the age of 88.
