= Michel Rey =

Swiss cross-country skier (1932–2020)

Personal information
- Nationality: Swiss
- Born: 3 February 1932 Massonnens, Switzerland
- Died: 31 January 2020 (aged 87)

Sport
- Sport: Cross-country skiing

Michel Rey (3 February 1932 – 31 January 2020) was a Swiss cross-country skier. He competed in the men's 15 kilometre event at the 1956 Winter Olympics. Rey died on 31 January 2020, at the age of 87.
