= Cross-country skiing at the 1956 Winter Olympics – Men's 30 kilometre =

Men's 30 km at the VII Olympic Winter Games
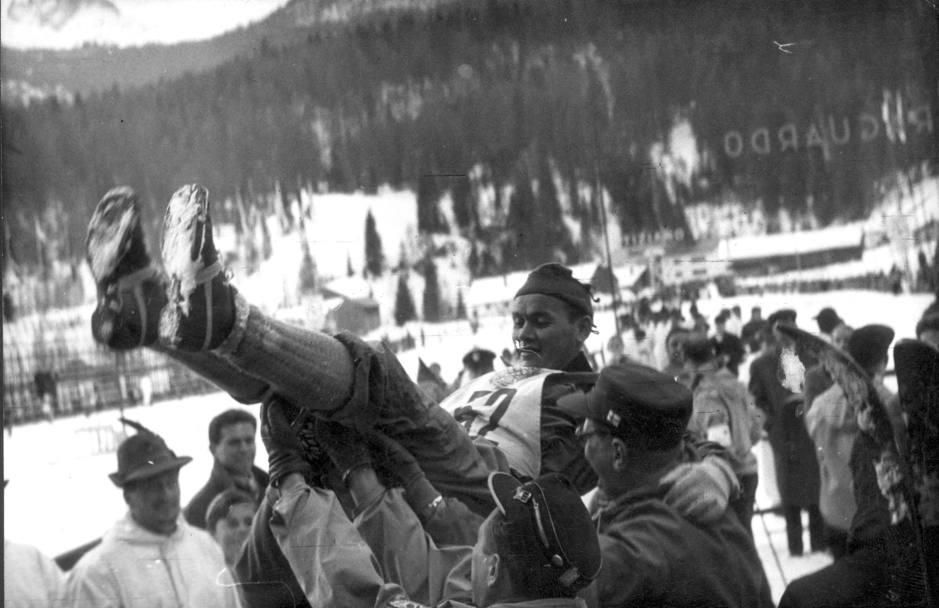
- Venue: Stadio della Neve
- Date: 27 January 1956
- Competitors: 51 from 18 nations
- Winning time: 1:44:06

Medalists
1st place, gold medalist(s)		Veikko Hakulinen	Finland
2nd place, silver medalist(s)		Sixten Jernberg	Sweden
3rd place, bronze medalist(s)		Pavel Kolchin	Soviet Union

The men's 30 km cross country race at the 1956 Winter Olympics took place on 27 January. It was held at the Snow Stadium (Lo Stadio della neve), which was about 2 km (1.2 mi) from Cotrina. Fifty-one competitors from eighteen countries participated in the event. Finnish skier Veikko Hakulinen won the event by only 24 seconds over Swede Sixten Jernberg. Hakulinen and Jernberg would switch positions on the podium in the 50 km (31 mi) event. Russian skier Pavel Kolchin won the bronze in the 30 km (19 mi) event and also in the 15 km (9.3 mi) event.

== Medalists ==
Gold	Veikko Hakulinen; Finland
Silver	Sixten Jernberg; Sweden
Bronze	Pavel Kolchin; Soviet Union

== Results ==
Place	No.	Competitor	Time	Difference*
1	52	Veikko Hakulinen (FIN)	1:44.06	
2	48	Sixten Jernberg (SWE)	1:44.30	+0.24
3	18	Pavel Kolchin (URS)	1:45.45	+1.39
4	7	Anatoly Shelyukhin (URS)	1:45.46	+1.40
5	45	Vladimir Kuzin (URS)	1:46.09	+2.03
6	23	Fedor Terentjev (URS)	1:46.43	+2.37
7	26	Per-Erik Larsson (SWE)	1:46.51	+2.45
8	3	Lennart Larsson (SWE)	1:46.56	+2.50
9	31	Olavi Latsa (FIN)	1:47.30	+3.24
10	25	Ilja Matous (TCH)	1:48.12	+4.06
11	17	Gunnar Samuelsson (SWE)	1:48.23	+4.17
12	43	Tadeusz Kwapien (POL)	1:49.09	+5.03
13	33	Federico Deflorian (ITA)	1:49.16	+5.10
14	50	Hallgeir Brenden (NOR)	1:49.29	+5.23
15	35	Martin Stokken (NOR)	1:49.38	+5.32
16	19	Josef Prokes (TCH)	1:50.49	+6.43
17	5	Oddmund Jensen (NOR)	1:51.04	+6.58
18	47	Jaroslav Cardal (TCH)	1:51.05	+6.59
19	14	Per Olsen (NOR)	1:51.15	+7.09
20	6	Kalevi Hämäläinen (FIN)	1:51.38	+7.32
21	16	August Kiuru (FIN)	1:51.56	+7.50
22	57	Rene Mandrillon (FRA)	1:52.18	+8.12
23	37	Jozef Rubis (POL)	1:53.57	+9.51
24	2	Arrigo Delladio (ITA)	1:54.27	+10.21
25	38	Marcel Huguenin (SUI)	1:54.36	+10.30
26	12	Camillo Zanolli (ITA)	1:54.42	+10.36
27	42	Fritz Kocher (SUI)	1:55.18	+11.12
28	46	Tatsuo Miyao (JPN)	1:55.40	+11.34
29	20	Stanislaw Bukowski (POL)	1:56.26	+12.20
30	54	Hermann Möchel (EUA)	1:56.34	+12.28
31	40	Manole Aldescu (ROM)	1:57.42	+13.36
32	9	Mateus Kordez (YUG)	1:57.48	+13.42
33	39	Erich Lindenlaub (EUA)	1:58.30	+14.24
34	10	André Huguenin (SUI)	1:58.40	+14.34
35	22	Paul Romand (FRA)	1:59.02	+14.56
36	32	Constantin Enache (ROM)	1:59.52	+15.46
37	58	Clarence Servold (CAN)	2:00.01	+15.55
38	56	Mack Miller (USA)	2:00.38	+16.32
39	55	John Kirstjansson (ISL)	2:00.52	+16.46
40	11	Werner Moring (EUA)	2:00.55	+16.49
41	8	Armand Genoud (SUI)	2:01.05	+16.59
42	27	Zravko Hlebanja (YUG)	2:01.47	+17.41
43	41	Christo Petkov Dontchev (BUL)	2:02.10	+18.04
44	36	Zaharin Mihailov Grivev (BUL)	2:03.21	+19.15
45	15	Štefan Robač (YUG)	2:03.55	+19.49
45	28	Andrew Morgan (GBR)	2:03.55	+19.49
47	21	John Moore (GBR)	2:08.58	+24.52
48	34	Oddur Petursson (ISL)	2:10.16	+26.10
49	51	James Spencer (GBR)	2:10.32	+26.26
50	24	Lynn Levy (USA)	2:10.56	+26.50
51	4	Thomas Cairney (GBR)	2:13.41	+29.35
—	30	Charles Binaux (FRA)	DSQ	
—	44	Ottavio Compagnoni (ITA)	DSQ	
—	53	Janez Pavcic (YUG)	DSQ	

* - Difference is in minutes and seconds.

== See also ==
- List of IOC country codes
- 1956 Winter Olympics
