= Minnevali Galiyev =

Russian cross-country skier

Personal information
- Nationality: Russian
- Born: 7 May 1930; Chistopolsky, Russian SFSR, Soviet Union
- Died: 28 December 2016 (aged 86); Yaroslavl, Russia

Sport
- Sport: Cross-country skiing

Minnevali Galiyev (7 May 1930 – 28 December 2016) was a Russian cross-country skier. He competed in the men's 15 kilometre event at the 1956 Winter Olympics.
