= Erwin Hari =

Swiss cross-country skier (1933–2024)

Erwino Hari
Personal information
- Full name: Erwino Gottlieb Hari
- Nationality: Swiss
- Born: 16 October 1933
- Died: 24 April 2024 (aged 90)

Sport
- Sport: Cross-country skiing

Erwino Gottlieb Hari (or Erwin Hari, 16 October 1933 – 24 April 2024) was a Swiss cross-country skier. He competed in the men's 15 kilometre event at the 1956 Winter Olympics. Hari died on 24 April 2024, at the age of 90.
