= Gunnar Samuelsson =

Swedish cross-country skier

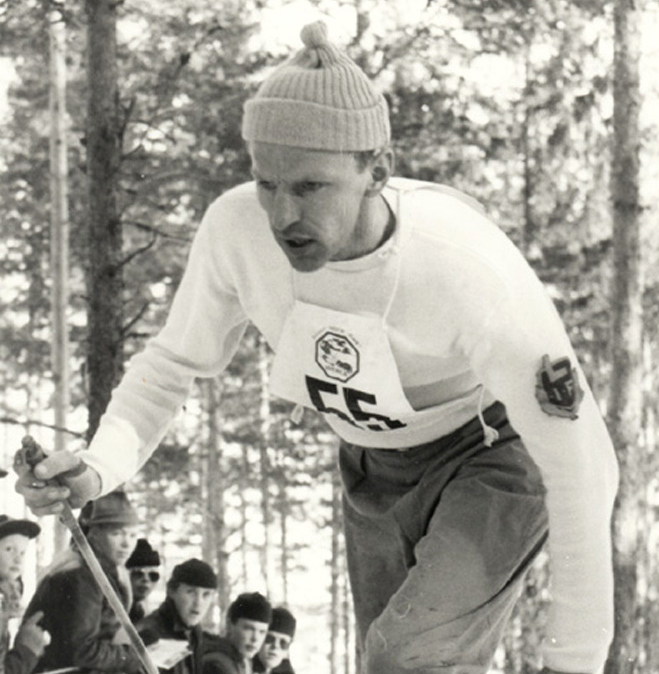

Personal information
- Born: 2 May 1927 Lima, Sweden
- Died: 4 November 2007 (aged 80) Lima, Sweden

Sport
- Sport: Cross-country skiing
- Club: Lima IF
Medal record
Men's cross-country skiing
Representing Sweden
Olympic Games
Bronze medal – third place	1956 Cortina d'Ampezzo	4 × 10 km relay

Gunnar Samuelsson (2 May 1927 – 4 November 2007) was a Swedish cross-country skier. He competed at the 1956 Winter Olympics and won a bronze medal in the 4 × 10 km relay, finishing 11th and 15th in the individual 15 km and 30 km races.

At the end of his career Samuelsson competed in biathlon and won silver and bronze medals in the Swedish Championships and a relay title in an international meet against East Germany.

== Cross-country skiing results ==
=== Olympic Games ===
- 1 medal – (1 bronze)

Year	Age	15 km	30 km	50 km	4 × 10 km relay
1956	28	15	11	—	Bronze
