= August Kiuru =

Finnish cross-country skier

Medal record

Men's cross-country skiing

Representing Finland

Olympic Games
Silver medal – second place	1948 St. Moritz	4 × 10 km relay
Silver medal – second place	1956 Cortina d'Ampezzo	4 × 10 km relay

World Championships
Gold medal – first place	1954 Falun	4 × 10 km relay
Silver medal – second place	1950 Lake Placid	4 × 10 km relay
Bronze medal – third place	1954 Falun	15 km

August Kiuru (12 July 1922, Sakkola – 23 February 2009) was a Finnish cross-country skier who competed in the late 1940s and early 1950s. He won two silver medals in the 4 × 10 km relay at the 1948 Winter Olympics and the 1956 Winter Olympics.

Kiuru also won three medals in the FIS Nordic World Ski Championships with a gold in the 4 × 10 km relay (1954), a silver in the 4 × 10 km relay (1950) and a bronze in the 15 km (1954).

== Cross-country skiing results ==
All results are sourced from the International Ski Federation (FIS).

=== Olympic Games ===
- 2 medals – (2 silver)

Year	Age	15 km	18 km	30 km	50 km	4 × 10 km relay
1948	25	—N/a	7	—N/a	—	Silver
1956	33	—	—N/a	21	—	Silver

=== World Championships ===
- 3 medals – (1 gold, 1 silver, 1 bronze)

Year	Age	15 km	18 km	30 km	50 km	4 × 10 km relay
1950	27	—N/a	4	—N/a	—	Silver
1954	31	Bronze	—N/a	—	—	Gold
