= Emil Okuliár =

Czech cross-country skier (1931–2010)

Personal information
- Nationality: Czech
- Born: 22 May 1931
- Died: 2010 (aged 78–79)

Sport
- Sport: Cross-country skiing

Emil Okuliár (22 May 1931 – 2010) was a Czech cross-country skier. He competed in the men's relay event at the 1956 Winter Olympics. Okuliár died in 2010.
