= Karl Bohlin =

American cross-country skier (born 1938)

Personal information
- Nationality: American
- Born: December 20, 1938 (age 87) Dalarna, Sweden

Sport
- Sport: Cross-country skiing

Karl Bohlin (born December 20, 1938) is an American cross-country skier. He competed at the 1960 Winter Olympics and the 1964 Winter Olympics.
