= Hallgeir Brenden =

Norwegian cross-country skier (1929–2007)

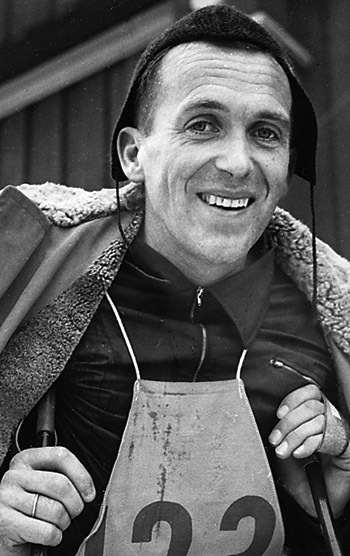

Personal information
- Born: 10 February 1929 Trysil, Norway
- Died: 21 September 2007 (aged 78) Lillehammer, Norway
- Height: 170 cm (5 ft 7 in)

Sport
- Sport: Cross-country skiing, athletics
- Events: 15 km, 18 km, 4×10 km 3000 m steeplechase
- Club: Vestre Trysil IL; IK Tjalve

Achievements and titles
- Personal best: 3000 mS – 8:54.6 (1954)
Medal record
Men's cross-country skiing
Representing Norway
Olympic Games
| Gold medal – first place | 1952 Oslo | 18 km |
| Silver medal – second place | 1952 Oslo | 4 × 10 km relay |
| Gold medal – first place | 1956 Cortina d'Ampezzo | 15 km |
| Silver medal – second place | 1960 Squaw Valley | 4 × 10 km relay |

Hallgeir Brenden (10 February 1929 – 21 September 2007) was a Norwegian cross-country skier and steeplechase runner.

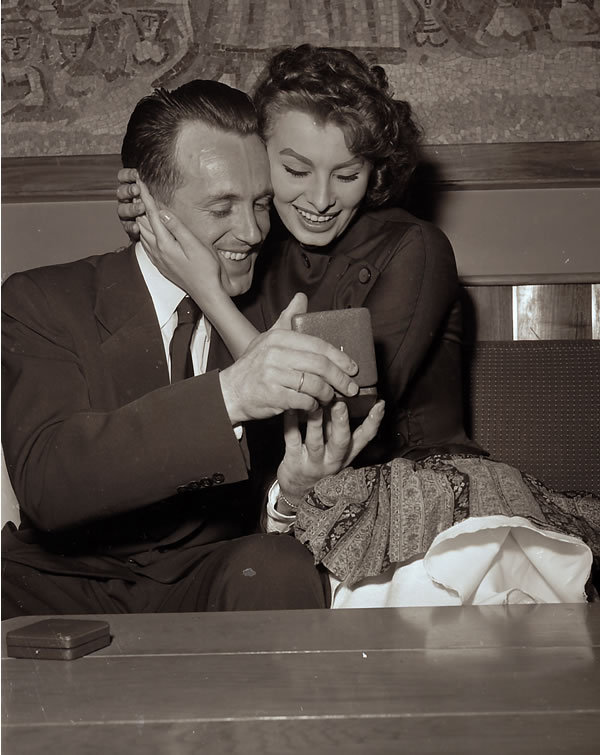
Brenden with Sophia Loren at the 1956 Winter Olympics

He competed in various skiing events at the 1952, 1956 and 1960 Winter Olympics and won two individual gold medals in 1952 and 1956 and two silver medals in the 4 × 10 km relay in 1952 and 1960.

He also won three events at the Holmenkollen ski festival: 18 km in 1952 and 15 km in 1956 and 1963. He received the Egebergs Ærespris in 1952 and the Holmenkollen medal in 1955.

As a steeplechase runner Brenden won the Norwegian championships in 1953 and 1954.

== Cross-country skiing results ==
All results are sourced from the International Ski Federation (FIS).

=== Olympic Games ===
- 4 medals – (2 gold, 2 silver)

| Year | Age | 15 km | 18 km | 30 km | 50 km | 4 × 10 km relay |
|---|---|---|---|---|---|---|
| 1952 | 22 | —N/a | Gold | —N/a | — | Silver |
| 1956 | 26 | Gold | —N/a | 14 | — | 4 |
| 1960 | 31 | 12 | —N/a | 9 | 9 | Silver |

=== World Championships ===
| Year | Age | 15 km | 30 km | 50 km | 4 × 10 km relay |
|---|---|---|---|---|---|
| 1954 | 25 | — | — | — | 4 |
| 1958 | 29 | 22 | 19 | — | 4 |
| 1962 | 33 | — | — | — | 4 |

Awards
| Preceded by Hjalmar Andersen | Egebergs Ærespris; 1952 | Succeeded by Roald Aas |
