= Matti Hamberg =

Finnish speed skater (1932–2025)

Matti Johan Hamberg (26 April 1932 – 15 September 2025) was a Finnish speed skater who competed in the 1956 Winter Olympics.

He was born in Helsinki. In 1956 he finished ninth in the 500 metres event, 18th in the 1500 metres competition, and 32nd in the 5000 metres contest. Hamberg died on 15 September 2025, at the age of 93.
