= Maurice Gover =

British cross-country skier (1932–2012)

Personal information
- Full name: Maurice Walter Brian Gover
- Nationality: British
- Born: 2 May 1932 Richmond, North Yorkshire, England
- Died: 21 February 2012 (aged 79) Alton, Hampshire, England

Sport
- Sport: Cross-country skiing

Maurice Walter Brian Gover (2 May 1932 – 21 February 2012) was a British cross-country skier. He competed in the men's 15 kilometre event at the 1956 Winter Olympics. Gover died in Alton, Hampshire on 21 February 2012, aged 79.
