= Innocenzo Chatrian =

Italian cross-country skier (1927–2019)

Personal information
- Born: 21 March 1927 Chambave, Italy
- Died: 28 May 2019 (aged 92) Moena, Italy

Sport
- Sport: Skiing
- Club: Fiamme Oro

Innocenzo Chatrian ([ʃatʁijɑ̃] - 21 March 1927 – 28 May 2019) was an Italian cross-country skier who competed at 1956 Winter Olympics. He started in two competitions:

- 4x10 km (5. place)
- 15 km (25. place)

He competed in 30 km competition at Nordic World Ski Championships 1958 where he finished at 39. place. He was born in Chambave and married in 1960.
