= Werner Zwingli =

Swiss cross-country skier

Personal information
- Nationality: Swiss
- Born: 6 January 1927

Sport
- Sport: Cross-country skiing

Werner Zwingli (born 6 January 1927) is a Swiss former cross-country skier. He competed in the men's 15 kilometre event at the 1956 Winter Olympics.
