= Arvo Viitanen =

Finnish cross-country skier (1924–1999)

Medal record

Men's cross-country skiing

Representing Finland

Olympic Games
Silver medal – second place	1956 Cortina d'Ampezzo	4 × 10 km

World Championships
Gold medal – first place	1954 Falun	4 × 10 km relay
Silver medal – second place	1954 Falun	15 km
Bronze medal – third place	1954 Falun	50 km
Bronze medal – third place	1958 Lahti	50 km
Bronze medal – third place	1958 Lahti	4 × 10 km relay

Arvo Albert Viitanen (12 April 1924 – 28 April 1999) was a Finnish cross-country skier who competed in the 1950s. He won a silver medal in the 4 × 10 km relay at the 1956 Winter Olympics in Cortina d'Ampezzo. He was born in Uurainen, Central Finland and died in Myllykoski.

Viitanen also won five medals in the FIS Nordic World Ski Championships with a gold in the 4 × 10 km relay (1954), a silver in the 15 km (1954), and bronzes in the 50 km (1954, 1958) and the 4 × 10 km relay (1958).

He also won the 50 km event at the Holmenkollen ski festival in 1956.

== Cross-country skiing results ==
All results are sourced from the International Ski Federation (FIS).

=== Olympic Games ===
- 1 medal – (1 silver)

Year	Age	15 km	30 km	50 km	4 × 10 km relay
1956	31	9	—	—	Silver

=== World Championships ===
- 5 medals – (1 gold, 1 silver, 3 bronze)

Year	Age	15 km	30 km	50 km	4 × 10 km relay
1954	29	Silver	—	Bronze	Gold
1958	33	7	4	Bronze	Bronze
