= Aubrey Fielder =

British cross-country skier (1929–2005)

Personal information
- Nationality: British
- Born: 29 August 1929; Dartford, England
- Died: 23 August 2005 (aged 75); Romsey, England

Sport
- Sport: Cross-country skiing

Aubrey Fielder (29 August 1929 – 23 August 2005) was a British cross-country skier. He competed in the men's 15 kilometre event at the 1956 Winter Olympics.
