= Victor Kronig =

Swiss cross-country skier

Personal information
- Nationality: Swiss
- Born: 18 December 1933 (age 91)

Sport
- Sport: Cross-country skiing

Victor Kronig (born 18 December 1933) is a Swiss cross-country skier. He competed in the men's 15 kilometre event at the 1956 Winter Olympics.
