= Kalevi Häkkinen =

Finnish alpine skier (1928–2017)

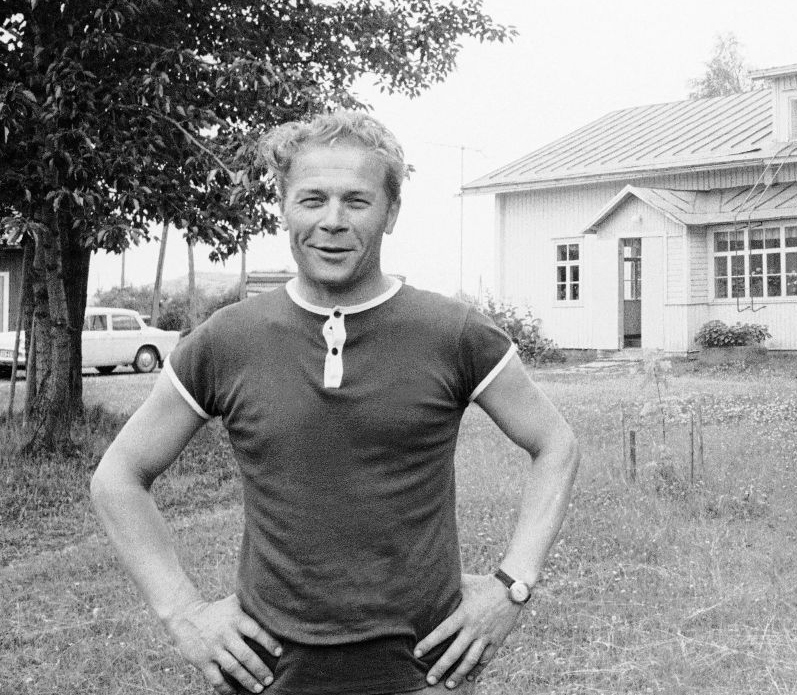
Kalevi Häkkinen in summer 1964.

Paavo Kalevi ”Häkä" Häkkinen (12 March 1928, in Hankasalmi – 21 March 2017) was a Finnish alpine skier who competed in the 1956 Winter Olympics.
