= Oskar Schulz =

Austrian cross-country skier

Oskar Schulz (14 October 1923 – 20 September 2017) was an Austrian cross-country skier who competed in the 1950s. He finished 48th in the 18 km event at the 1952 Winter Olympics in Oslo. Four years later he was a member of the Austrian relay team which finished eleventh in the 4 x 10 km relay event. He later was a professor at the Institute for Mineralogy and Petrography at the University of Innsbruck. In 1990, he was made a founding member of the European Academy of Sciences and Arts.
