= Cross-country skiing at the 1960 Winter Olympics – Men's 4 × 10 kilometre relay =

Men's 4 × 10 kilometre relay at the VIII Olympic Winter Games
- Cross-country skiing
- Venue: McKinney Creek Stadium
- Date: February 25, 1960
- Competitors: 44 from 11 nations
- Winning time: 2:18:45.6

Medalists
1st place, gold medalist(s)		Toimi Alatalo; Eero Mäntyranta; Väinö Huhtala; Veikko Hakulinen	Finland
2nd place, silver medalist(s)		Harald Grønningen; Hallgeir Brenden; Einar Østby; Håkon Brusveen	Norway
3rd place, bronze medalist(s)		Anatoly Shelyukhin; Gennady Vaganov; Aleksey Kuznetsov; Nikolay Anikin	Soviet Union

The men's 4 × 10 kilometre relay cross-country skiing event was part of the cross-country skiing programme at the 1960 Winter Olympics, in Squaw Valley, California, United States. It was the fifth appearance of the event. The competition was held on Saturday, February 27, 1960, at the McKinney Creek Stadium.

Finland won the gold medal with less than one second ahead of Nordic rivals Norway. It was the third time out of five that Finland had won gold in this event. Defending champions Soviet Union took the bronze medal. It was also Veikko Hakulinen's third Olympic gold and first at these games.

== Results ==
Rank	Nation	Skiers	Time
1	Finland	Toimi Alatalo (35:03); Eero Mäntyranta (34:45); Väinö Huhtala (35:01); Veikko Hakulinen (33:56.6)	2:18:45.6
2	Norway	Harald Grønningen (35:07); Hallgeir Brenden (34:41); Einar Østby (34:41); Håkon Brusveen (34:17.4)	2:18:46.4
3	Soviet Union	Anatoly Shelyukhin (37:17); Gennady Vaganov (34:22); Aleksey Kuznetsov (35:11); Nikolay Anikin (34:31.6)	2:21:21.6
4	Sweden	Lars Olsson (34:56); Janne Stefansson (37:44); Lennart Larsson (34:44); Sixten Jernberg (34:07.8)	2:21:31.8
5	Italy	Giulio De Florian (35:37); Giuseppe Steiner (35:59); Pompeo Fattor (35:30); Marcello De Dorigo (35:26.5)	2:22:32.5
6	Poland	Andrzej Mateja (36:22); Józef Rysula (35:33); Józef Gut-Misiaga (37:19); Kazimierz Zelek (37:51.3)	2:26:25.3
7	France	Victor Arbez (36:50); René Mandrillon (36:46); Benoît Carrara (36:41); Jean Mermet (36:13.8)	2:26:30.8
8	Switzerland	Fritz Kocher (37:43); Marcel Huguenin (38:15); Lorenz Possa (36:37); Alphonse Baume (37:01.8)	2:29:36.8
9	United Team of Germany	Kuno Werner (37:27); Helmut Hagg (37:53); Werner Haase (37:58); Enno Röder (38:29.1)	2:31:47.1
10	Japan	Takashi Matsuhashi (39:02); Kazuo Sato (37:41); Eiji Kurita (39:17); Akemi Taniguchi (40:44.9)	2:36:44.9
11	United States	Mack Miller (37:04); Karl Bohlin (40:47); John Dendahl (39:11); Peter Lahdenpera (40:59.8)	2:38:01.8
