= Janez Pavčič =

Slovenian cross-country skier

Personal information
- Nationality: Slovenian
- Born: 18 October 1928 (age 98) Ljubljana, Yugoslavia

Sport
- Sport: Cross-country skiing

Janez Pavčič (born 18 October 1928) is a Slovenian cross-country skier. He competed in the men's 15 kilometre event at the 1956 Winter Olympics.
