= Pavel Kolchin =

Soviet cross-country skier

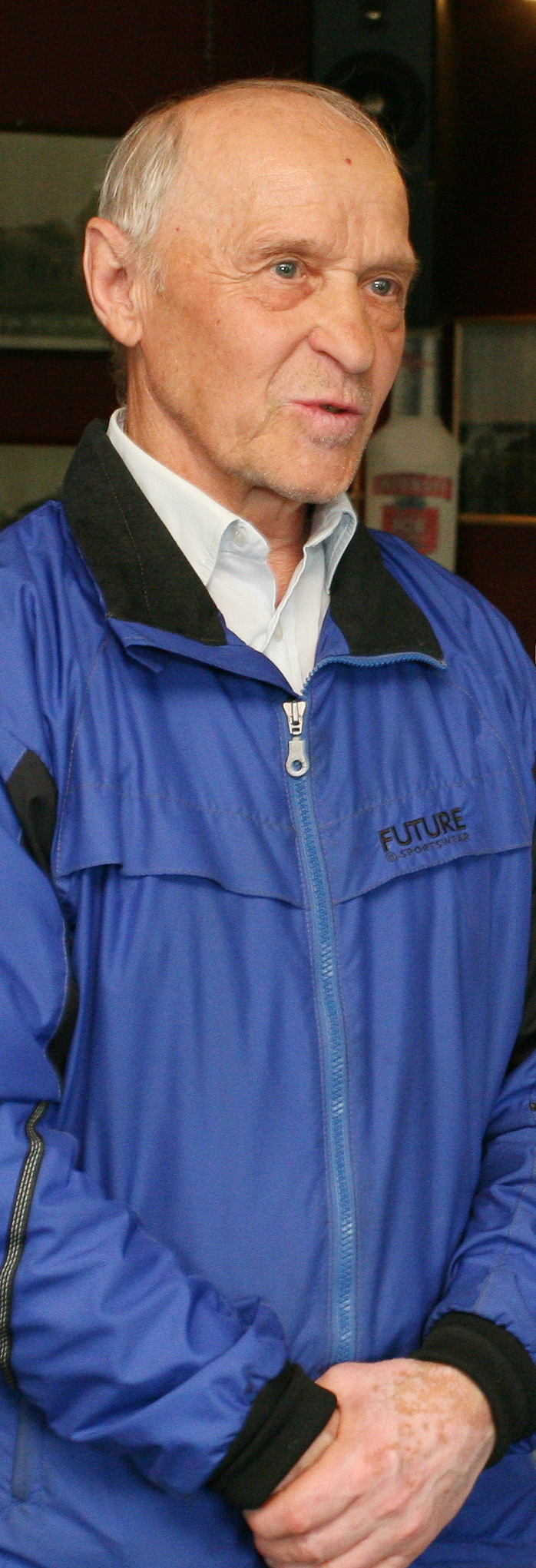

Personal information
- Born: Pavel Konstantinovich Kolchin; 9 January 1930 Yaroslavl, RSFSR, Soviet Union
- Died: 29 December 2010 (aged 80) Otepää, Valga County, Estonia
- Height: 1.62 m (5 ft 4 in)

Sport
- Sport: Skiing
- Club: Dynamo Moscow
Medal record
Men's cross-country skiing
Representing Soviet Union
Olympic Games
Gold medal – first place	1956 Cortina d'Ampezzo	4×10 km
Bronze medal – third place	1956 Cortina d'Ampezzo	15 km
Bronze medal – third place	1956 Cortina d'Ampezzo	30 km
Bronze medal – third place	1964 Innsbruck	4×10 km
World Championships
Silver medal – second place	1958 Lahti	15 km
Silver medal – second place	1958 Lahti	30 km
Silver medal – second place	1958 Lahti	4×10 km
Bronze medal – third place	1962 Zakopane	4×10 km
- Updated on 28 January 2012

Pavel Konstantinovich Kolchin (sometimes spelled Pavel Koltsjin; Russian: Павел Константинович Колчин; 9 January 1930 – 29 December 2010) was a Soviet cross-country skier who competed during the 1950s and 1960s, training at Dynamo in Moscow. He was born in Yaroslavl.

He competed in two Winter Olympics, earning a total of four medals. His bronze in the 15 km (9 mi) at the 1956 Winter Olympics was the first ever medal awarded to a non-Scandinavian (Finland, Norway, and Sweden) in cross-country skiing. Kolchin also won at the Holmenkollen ski festival, winning both the 15 km (9 mi) and 50 km (31 mi) events in 1958. His wife, Alevtina Kolchina, was also an Olympic champion in cross-country skiing in 1964.

Kolchin also found success was at the FIS Nordic World Ski Championships, where he won three silver medals in 1958 (15 km, 30 km, and 4 x 10 km) and a bronze medal in 1962 (4 x 10 km).

Kolchin was awarded Order of the Red Banner of Labour (twice - in 1957 and 1972) and Order of the Badge of Honour (1970). For his successes at the Winter Olympics, the Nordic skiing World Championships and the Holmenkollen, Kolchin received the Holmenkollen medal in 1963 (Shared with his Alevtina Kolchina (his wife), Astrid Sandvik, and Torbjørn Yggeseth). Kolchin and Kolchina are the first husband and wife team to ever win the Holmenkollen Medal. Kolchin died on 29 December 2010.
