= Josef Prokeš =

Czech cross-country skier

Personal information
- Nationality: Czech
- Born: 25 February 1933
- Died: 25 August 2016 (aged 83)

Sport
- Sport: Cross-country skiing

Josef Prokeš (25 February 1933 – 25 August 2016) was a Czech cross-country skier. He competed in the men's 15 kilometre event at the 1956 Winter Olympics.
