= Sirkka Polkunen =

Finnish cross-country skier

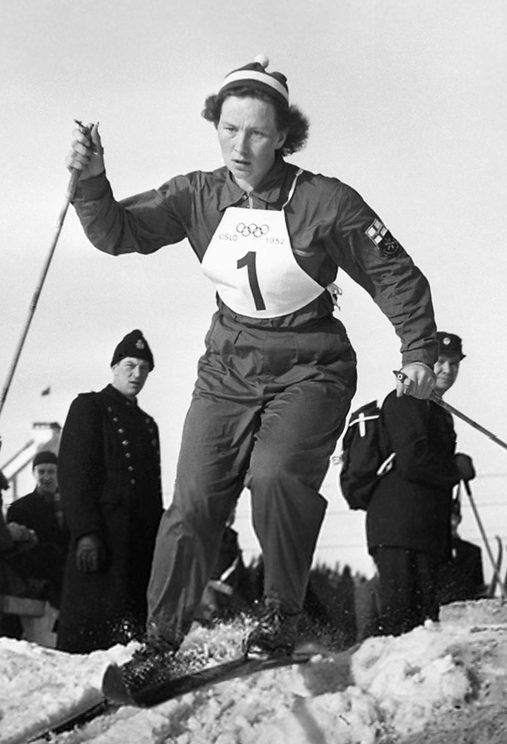
- Polkunen at the 1952 Olympics

Personal information
- Born: 6 November 1927 Jyväskylä, Finland
- Died: 28 September 2014 (aged 86) Laukaa, Finland
- Height: 163 cm (5 ft 4 in)
- Weight: 59 kg (130 lb)

Sport
- Sport: Cross-country skiing
- Club: Vihtavuoren Pamaus
Medal record
Women's cross-country skiing
Representing Finland
Olympic Games
Gold medal – first place	1956 Cortina d'Ampezzo	3 × 5 km relay
World Championships
Silver medal – second place	1954 Falun	3 × 5 km relay

Sirkka Tellervo "Telle" Polkunen (later Vilander, 6 November 1927 – 28 September 2014), was a Finnish cross-country skier who competed at the 1952 and 1956 Olympics. She won a gold medal in the 3 × 5 km relay in 1956 and placed fifth and eighth in the individual 10 km event in 1952 and 1956, respectively. Polkunen also won a silver medal in the 3 × 5 km relay at the 1954 FIS Nordic World Ski Championships and finished sixth in the 10 km at those championships.

Polkunen never won a national title, placing second-third over 10 km in 1951, 1953–54 and 1956. She worked as a loader and packer at the Vihtavuori gunpowder factory, and retired from competitions in 1957.

== Cross-country skiing results ==
All results are sourced from the International Ski Federation (FIS).

=== Olympic Games ===
- 1 medal – (1 gold)

Year	Age	10 km	3 × 5 km relay
1952	24	5	—N/a
1956	28	8	Gold

=== World Championships ===
- 1 medal – (1 silver)

Year	Age	10 km	3 × 5 km relay
1954	26	6	Silver
