= Zdravko Hlebanja =

Slovenian cross-country skier

Personal information
- Nationality: Slovenian
- Born: 15 October 1929 Mojstrana, Yugoslavia
- Died: 9 March 2018 (aged 88)

Sport
- Sport: Cross-country skiing

Zdravko Hlebanja (15 October 1929 – 9 March 2018) was a Slovenian cross-country skier. He competed in the men's 15 kilometre event at the 1956 Winter Olympics.
