= Rudi Kopp =

German cross-country skier (1926–2022)

Rudolf "Rudi" Kopp (31 January 1926 – 29 January 2022) was a West German cross-country skier who competed in the 1950s. He was born in Rabenstein. He finished 64th in the 18 km event at the 1952 Winter Olympics in Oslo. He also competed at the 1956 Winter Olympics. Kopp died on 29 January 2022, at the age of 95.
