= Sixten Jernberg =

Swedish cross-country skier (1929–2012)

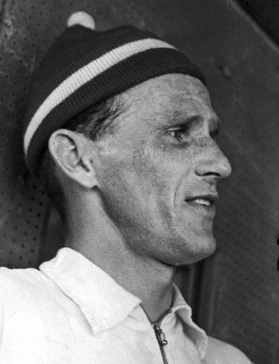
- Jernberg in 1958

Personal information
- Full name: Edy Sixten Jernberg
- Nationality: Sweden
- Born: 6 February 1929 Lima, Sweden
- Died: 14 July 2012 (aged 83) Mora, Sweden
- Height: 177 cm (5 ft 10 in)

Sport
- Sport: Skiing
- Club: Lima IF
Medal record
Men's cross-country skiing
Representing Sweden
Olympic Games
Gold medal – first place	1956 Cortina d'Ampezzo	50 km
Gold medal – first place	1960 Squaw Valley	30 km
Gold medal – first place	1964 Innsbruck	50 km
Gold medal – first place	1964 Innsbruck	4 × 10 km relay
Silver medal – second place	1956 Cortina d'Ampezzo	15 km
Silver medal – second place	1956 Cortina d'Ampezzo	30 km
Silver medal – second place	1960 Squaw Valley	15 km
Bronze medal – third place	1956 Cortina d'Ampezzo	4 × 10 km relay
Bronze medal – third place	1964 Innsbruck	15 km
World Championships
Gold medal – first place	1958 Lahti	50 km
Gold medal – first place	1958 Lahti	4 × 10 km relay
Gold medal – first place	1962 Zakopane	50 km
Gold medal – first place	1962 Zakopane	4 × 10 km relay
Bronze medal – third place	1954 Falun	4 × 10 km relay
Bronze medal – third place	1958 Lahti	30 km

Edy Sixten Jernberg (6 February 1929 – 14 July 2012) was a Swedish cross-country skier and one of the most successful cross-country skiers of all time. Between 1952 and 1964 he took part in 363 ski races, finishing on the podium in 263 and winning 134 of them; during this period he won four world titles and nine Olympic medals. In 12 starts over three consecutive Winter Games he never finished worse than fifth place, and between 1955 and 1960, he won 86 out of 161 competitions.

Jernberg was a blacksmith and a lumberjack before beginning his career as a cross-country skier. He specialized in the longer distances, with four of his eight gold medals coming over 50 km, one over 30 km and three in the 4 × 10 km relay. He also won Vasaloppet twice, 1955 and 1960. He won the 15 km at the Holmenkollen ski festival in 1954.

At one competition, Jernberg had a fever and coughed up blood, but still finished the 50 km event. Gunde Svan said: "It was almost like [Sixten] didn't like his own body and tried to punish it in different ways."

For his cross-country skiing successes, Jernberg was awarded the Holmenkollen medal in 1960 (shared with Helmut Recknagel, Sverre Stensheim and Tormod Knutsen). He was also awarded the Svenska Dagbladet Gold Medal in 1956 (shared with pentathlete Lars Hall).

Jernberg retired after the Olympic Winter Games of 1964. In 1965, the International Olympic Committee awarded Jernberg the Mohammed Taher Trophy for his contributions to Nordic skiing. He died of a stroke at the age of 83. His nephew Ingemar became an Olympic pole vaulter.

== Cross-country skiing results ==
All results are sourced from the International Ski Federation (FIS).

=== Olympic Games ===
- 9 medals – (4 gold, 3 silver, 2 bronze)

Year	Age	15 km	30 km	50 km	4 × 10 km relay
1956	27	Silver	Silver	Gold	Bronze
1960	31	Silver	Gold	5	4
1964	35	Bronze	5	Gold	Gold

=== World Championships ===
- 6 medals – (4 gold, 2 bronze)

Year	Age	15 km	30 km	50 km	4 × 10 km relay
1954	25	7	4	12	Bronze
1958	29	4	Bronze	Gold	Gold
1962	33	—	10	Gold	Gold

== See also ==
- List of multiple Winter Olympic medalists
- List of multiple Olympic gold medalists
- List of multiple Olympic medalists

Records
Preceded by Himself	Athlete with the most medals at Winter Olympics; 25 February 1988 – 17 February 1992; With: Raisa Smetanina	Succeeded by (Soviet Union) Raisa Smetanina
Preceded by Himself with (Finland) Clas Thunberg and (Norway) Ivar Ballangrud	Athlete with the most medals at Winter Olympics; 5 February 1964 – 25 February 1988	Succeeded by Himself with (Soviet Union) Raisa Smetanina
Preceded by (Finland) Clas Thunberg and (Norway) Ivar Ballangrud	Athlete with the most medals at Winter Olympics; 2 February 1964 – 5 February 1964; With: Clas Thunberg; Ivar Ballangrud	Succeeded by Himself
Awards
Preceded by Sigvard Ericsson	Svenska Dagbladet Gold Medal with Lars Hall; 1956	Succeeded by Dan Waern
