= Paavo Korhonen =

Finnish Nordic combined skier (1928–2019)

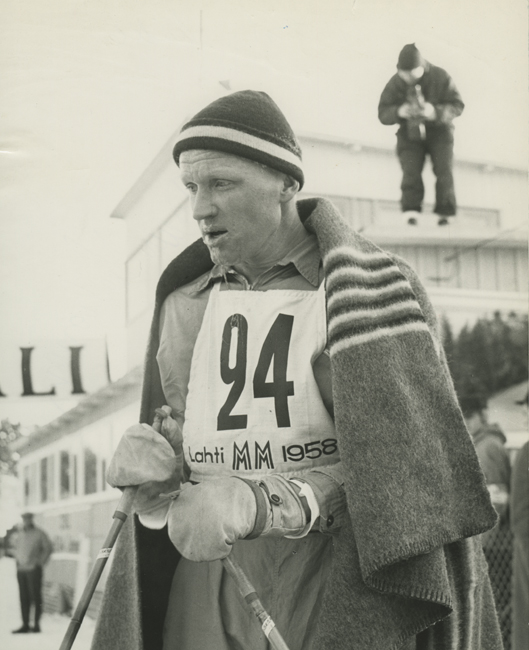
- Paavo Korhonen in Lahti 1958 Nordic Ski World Championships

Personal information
- Born: 5 June 1928 Joutseno, Finland
- Died: 29 September 2019 (aged 91)
- Height: 171 cm (5 ft 7 in)
- Weight: 78 kg (172 lb)

Sport
- Sport: Nordic combined
- Club: Joutsenon Kullervo
Medal record
Men's Nordic combined
Representing Finland
World Championships
Gold medal – first place	1958 Lahti	Individual

Paavo Jaakko Matias Korhonen (5 June 1928 – 29 September 2019) was a Finnish Nordic skier who won the individual titles at the 1957 Holmenkollen ski festival and 1958 FIS Nordic World Ski Championships. He competed at the 1952, 1956 and 1960 Olympics and placed fourth, fourth and ninth, respectively. At the 1952 games he also finished 14th in the 18 km cross-country skiing race, and in 1960 served as the Finnish Olympic flag bearer at the opening ceremony. Korhonen lived in his home town of Joutseno, where a statue is erected in his honor.

== Cross-country skiing results ==
=== Olympic Games ===
Year	Age	18 km	50 km	4 × 10 km relay
1952	23	14	—	—
