= Antti Hyvärinen =

Finnish ski jumper and coach (1932–2000)

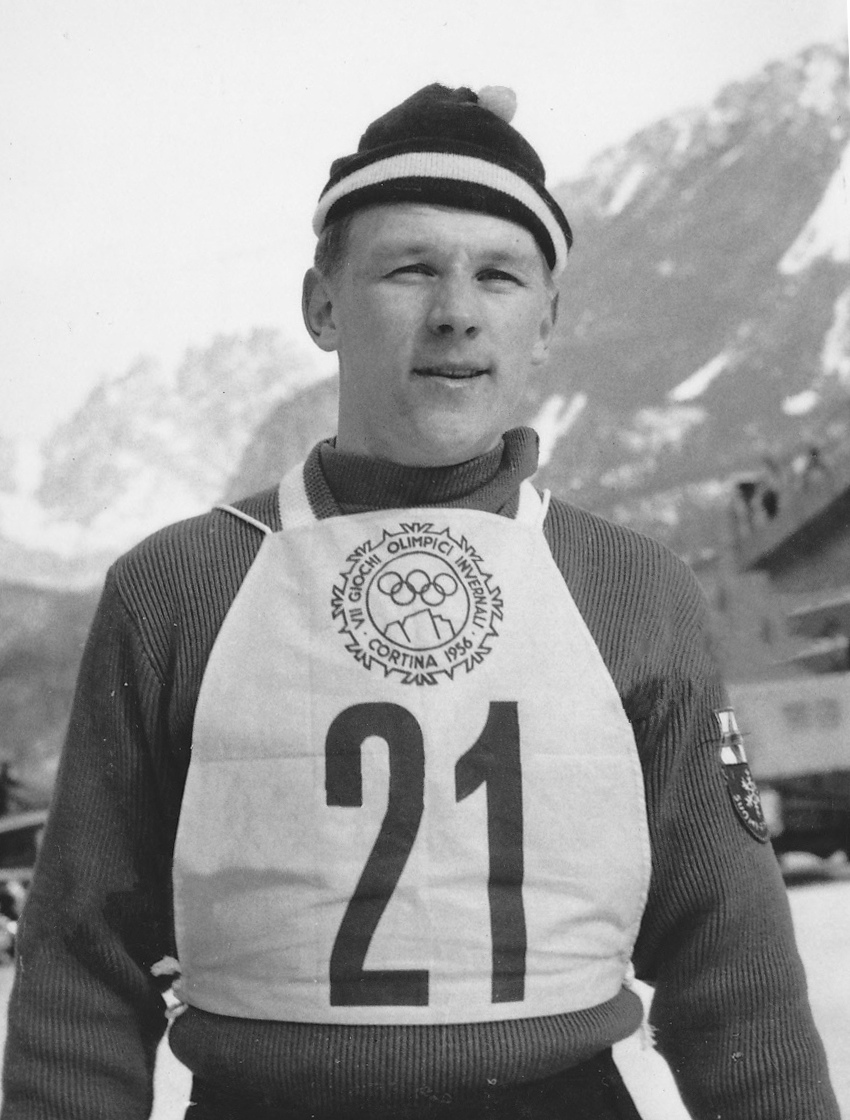
- Hyvärinen in 1956

Personal information
- Born: 21 June 1932 Rovaniemi, Finland
- Died: 13 January 2000 (aged 67) Bad Nauheim, Germany
- Height: 176 cm (5 ft 9 in)
- Weight: 70 kg (154 lb)

Sport
- Sport: Ski jumping
- Club: Ounasvaaran Hiihtoseura, Rovaniemi
Medal record
Representing Finland
Olympic Games
Gold medal – first place	1956 Cortina d'Ampezzo	Large hill
World Championships
Gold medal – first place	1956 Cortina d'Ampezzo	Large hill

Antti Abram Hyvärinen (21 June 1932 – 13 January 2000) was a Finnish ski jumper and coach. He competed at the 1952 and 1956 Olympic events and finished in seventh and first place, respectively, becoming the first non-Norwegian ski jumper to win an Olympic gold medal. In 1956, he also served as the flag bearer for Finland at the opening ceremony of the Winter Olympics and won the jumping event at the Holmenkollen Ski Festival. While preparing for the 1958 World Championships, Hyvärinen fell and broke his hip, which resulted in an early retirement in November 1957. From 1960 to 1964, he worked as the head coach of the Finnish ski jumping team.
