= Ilja Matouš =

Czech cross-country skier

Personal information
- Nationality: Czech
- Born: 17 April 1931; Horní Branná, Czechoslovakia
- Died: 24 April 2018 (aged 87)

Sport
- Sport: Cross-country skiing

Ilja Matouš (born 17 April 1931 – 24 April 2018) was a Czech cross-country skier. He competed in the men's 15 kilometre event at the 1956 Winter Olympics.
