= Josef Schneeberger =

Austrian cross-country skier

Josef "Sepp" Schneeberger (November 11, 1919 – February 10, 1989) was an Austrian cross-country skier who competed in the 1950s. He finished 23rd in the 18 km event at the 1952 Winter Olympics in Oslo. Four years later he was a member of the Austrian relay team which finished eleventh in the 4 x 10 km relay event.
