= Veikko Hakulinen =

Finnish forestry technician and cross country skier

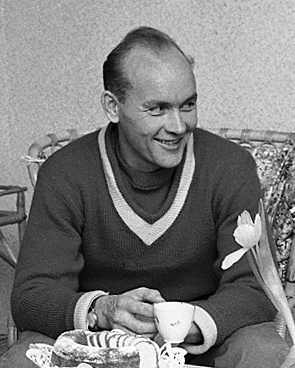
- Hakulinen in 1959

Personal information
- Full name: Veikko Johannes Hakulinen
- Born: 4 January 1925 Kurkijoki, Finland
- Died: 24 October 2003 (aged 78) Valkeakoski, Finland
- Height: 173 cm (5 ft 8 in)
- Weight: 66 kg (146 lb)

Sport
- Sport: Cross-country skiing, biathlon
- Club: Asikkalan Raikas; Valkeakosken Haka; Jämsänkosken Ilves; Evon Metsäpojat; Tampereen Hiihtoseura; Tampereen Pyrintö; Tampereen Maila.
Medal record
Representing Finland
Men's cross-country skiing
Olympic Games
Gold medal – first place	1952 Oslo	50 km
Gold medal – first place	1956 Cortina d'Ampezzo	30 km
Gold medal – first place	1960 Squaw Valley	4 × 10 km relay
Silver medal – second place	1956 Cortina d'Ampezzo	50 km
Silver medal – second place	1956 Cortina d'Ampezzo	4 × 10 km relay
Silver medal – second place	1960 Squaw Valley	50 km
Bronze medal – third place	1960 Squaw Valley	15 km
World Championships
Gold medal – first place	1954 Falun	15 km
Gold medal – first place	1954 Falun	4 × 10 km relay
Gold medal – first place	1958 Lahti	15 km
Silver medal – second place	1954 Falun	30 km
Silver medal – second place	1954 Falun	50 km
Silver medal – second place	1958 Lahti	50 km
Bronze medal – third place	1958 Lahti	4 × 10 km relay
Men's biathlon
World Championships
Silver medal – second place	1963 Seefeld	20 km team

Veikko Johannes Hakulinen (4 January 1925 – 24 October 2003) was a Finnish cross-country skier, triple champion in both the Olympics and World Championships. He also competed in biathlon, orienteering, ski-orienteering, cross-country running, and rowing at a national level.

== Biography ==
Hakulinen won the 50 km event at the 1952 Winter Olympics with a memorable time of 3:33.33. Finland also won the 4 × 10 km relay, but Hakulinen was not on the team. Hakulinen was part of the Finland's winning relay team in the 1960 Winter Olympics, and won the 30 km gold in the 1956 Olympics. At his fourth games in 1964 he served as the Finnish Olympic flag bearer and competed only in biathlon.

In Finland, Hakulinen was chosen as sports personality of the year in 1952–1954 and 1960. He was decorated with the Pro Urheilu letter of recognition 2000.

Hakulinen also won the 50 km at the Holmenkollen ski festival twice (1953 and 1955), the 18 km (1953) and the 15 km (1957). For his efforts in cross-country skiing, Hakulinen was awarded the Holmenkollen medal in 1955 (shared with King Haakon VII, Hallgeir Brenden, and Sverre Stenersen).

Hakulinen was a forester by profession and held the rank of sergeant in the Finnish Army. He died in Valkeakoski in a car accident on 24 October 2003.

== Cross-country skiing results ==
All results are sourced from the International Ski Federation (FIS).

=== Olympic Games ===
- 7 medals – (3 gold, 3 silver, 1 bronze)

Year	Age	15 km	30 km	50 km	4 × 10 km relay
1952	27	—N/a	—N/a	Gold	—
1956	31	4	Gold	Silver	Silver
1960	35	Bronze	6	Silver	Gold

=== World Championships ===
- 7 medals – (3 gold, 3 silver, 1 bronze)

Year	Age	15 km	30 km	50 km	4 × 10 km relay
1954	29	Gold	Silver	Silver	Gold
1958	33	Gold	6	Silver	Bronze

== Biathlon results ==
- World championships, Seefeld 1963 – silver (team competition), sixth (20 km)
- Olympics, Innsbruck 1964 – 15th (20 km)
- World championships, Elverum 1965 – fifth (team competition), 31st (20 km)

== Bibliography ==
- Hakulinen, Veikko. Haku-Veikko, suurhiihtäjä Veikko Hakulisen muistelmat 1999 (an autobiography)
- Kolkka, Sulo. Veikko Hakulinen, latujen valtias 1960 (biography)
