= Stadio della neve =

Stadium in Cortina d'Ampezzo, Italy

Coordinates: 46.5206°N 12.1325°E

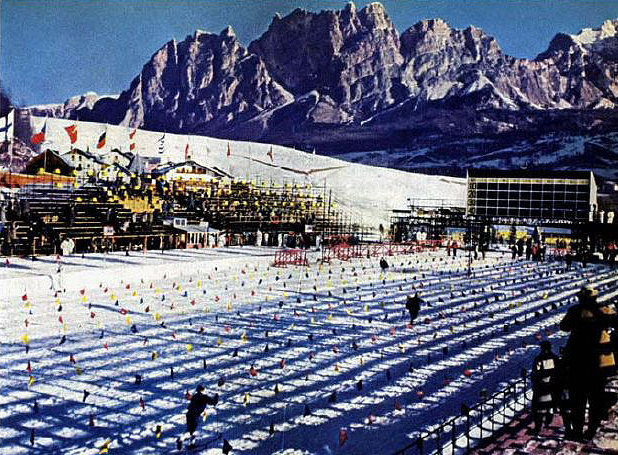
Competition at the Olympic Snow Stadium in 1956.

Stadio della neve was a temporary stadium located in Cortina d'Ampezzo, Italy. Located in the Campo di Sotto area, the venue hosted the cross-country skiing and the cross-country skiing part of the Nordic combined events for the 1956 Winter Olympics.

Post Olympics the stands and scoreboard was removed with the site now a grass field.
