= FIS Nordic World Ski Championships 1954 =

International Nordic skiing competition

- Host city: Falun
- Country: Sweden
- Events: 8
- Opening: 13 February 1954
- Closing: 21 February 1954

The FIS Nordic World Ski Championships 1954 took place 13–21 February 1954 in Falun, Sweden. These were the first races where women competed with events in the 10 km and 3 × 5 km relay. It also saw the 18 km reduced to 15 km in men's cross-country along with the return of the 30 km which was last held in 1926. The Nordic combined saw the ski jump held first with the cross-country distance reduced to 15 km as well. The Soviet Union also debuted in these championships as well.

== Men's cross-country ==
=== 15 km ===
17 February 1954

Medal	Athlete	Time
Gold	Veikko Hakulinen (FIN)	
Silver	Arvo Viitanen (FIN)	
Bronze	August Kiuru (FIN)	

=== 30 km ===
14 February 1954

Medal	Athlete	Time
Gold	Vladimir Kuzin (URS)	
Silver	Veikko Hakulinen (FIN)	
Bronze	Martti Lautala (FIN)	

Vladimir Kuzin was the first person from the Soviet Union to win an event at the FIS Nordic World Ski Championships.

=== 50 km ===
21 February 1954

Medal	Athlete	Time
Gold	Vladimir Kuzin (URS)	
Silver	Veikko Hakulinen (FIN)	
Bronze	Arvo Viitanen (FIN)	

=== 4 × 10 km relay ===
20 February 1954

Medal	Team	Time
Gold	Finland (August Kiuru, Tapio Mäkelä, Arvo Viitanen, Veikko Hakulinen)	
Silver	Soviet Union (Nikolay Koslov, Fyodor Terentyev, Aleksey Kuznetsov, Vladimir Kuzin)	
Bronze	Sweden (Sune Larsson, Sixten Jernberg, Arthur Olsson, Per-Erik Larsson)	

== Women's cross-country ==
=== 10 km ===
21 February 1954

Medal	Athlete	Time
Gold	Lyubov Kozyreva (URS)	
Silver	Siiri Rantanen (FIN)	
Bronze	Mirja Hietamies (FIN)	

Kozyreva was the first woman to win at the FIS Nordic World Ski Championships.

=== 3 × 5 km relay ===
17 February 1954

Medal	Team	Time
Gold	Soviet Union (Lyubov Kozyreva, Margarita Maslennikova, Valentina Tsaryova)	
Silver	Finland (Sirkka Polkunen, Mirja Hietamies, Siiri Rantanen)	
Bronze	Sweden (Anna-Lisa Eriksson, Märta Norberg, Sonja Edström)	

== Men's Nordic combined ==
=== Individual ===
16 February 1954 (Jumping) 17 February 1954 (Skiing, included in 15 km run)

Medal	Athlete	Points
Gold	Sverre Stenersen (NOR)	
Silver	Gunder Gundersen (NOR)	
Bronze	Kjetil Mårdalen (NOR)	

== Men's ski jumping ==
=== Individual large hill ===
14 February 1954

Medal	Athlete	Points
Gold	Matti Pietikäinen (FIN)	
Silver	Veikko Heinonen (FIN)	
Bronze	Bror Östman (SWE)	

== Medal table ==
Rank	Nation	Gold	Silver	Bronze	Total
1	Soviet Union (URS)	4	1	0	5
2	Finland (FIN)	3	6	4	13
3	Norway (NOR)	1	1	1	3
4	Sweden (SWE)	0	0	3	3
Totals (4 entries)		8	8	8	24
