= Cross-country skiing at the 1960 Winter Olympics – Men's 30 kilometre =

Men's 30km at the VIII Olympic Winter Games
- Cross-country skiing
- Venue: McKinney Creek Stadium
- Date: February 19, 1960
- Competitors: 48 from 17 nations
- Winning time: 1:51:03.9

Medalists
1st place, gold medalist(s)		Sixten Jernberg	Sweden
2nd place, silver medalist(s)		Rolf Rämgård	Sweden
3rd place, bronze medalist(s)		Nikolay Anikin	Soviet Union

The 30 kilometre cross-country skiing event was part of the cross-country skiing programme at the 1960 Winter Olympics, in Squaw Valley, California, United States. It was the second appearance of the event at its length of 30 km. The competition was held on Saturday, February 19, 1960 at the McKinney Creek Stadium.

Sixten Jernberg of Sweden won the gold medal ahead of fellow Swede Rolf Rämgård. Defending Olympic champion Veikko Hakulinen from Finland finished 6th. Three of the 48 competitors did not finish

== Results ==
Rank	Name	Country	Time
1	Sixten Jernberg	Sweden	1:51:03.9
2	Rolf Rämgård	Sweden	1:51:16.9
3	Nikolay Anikin	Soviet Union	1:52:28.2
4	Gennady Vaganov	Soviet Union	1:52:49.2
5	Lennart Larsson	Sweden	1:53:53.2
6	Veikko Hakulinen	Finland	1:54:02.0
7	Toimi Alatalo	Finland	1:54:06.5
8	Aleksey Kuznetsov	Soviet Union	1:54:23.9
9	Hallgeir Brenden	Norway	1:55:19.8
10	Oddmund Jensen	Norway	1:55:35.0
11	Giulio Deflorian	Italy	1:56:40.2
12	Kalevi Hämäläinen	Finland	1:56:54.4
13	Allan Andersson	Sweden	1:57:09.9
14	Pompeo Fattor	Italy	1:57:40.5
15	Anatoly Shelyukhin	Soviet Union	1:58:21.3
16	Magnar Lundemo	Norway	1:58:46.6
17	Ottavio Compagnoni	Italy	1:58:55.0
18	Arto Tiainen	Finland	1:58:56.6
19	Jean Mermet	France	1:58:57.9
20	Sverre Stensheim	Norway	1:59:52.8
21	Helmut Weidlich	United Team of Germany	2:01:25.8
22	Kazimierz Zelek	Poland	2:01:27.1
23	Andrzej Mateja	Poland	2:01:54.7
24	Alphonse Baume	Switzerland	2:02:04.2
25	René Mandrillon	France	2:02:05.3
26	Sepp Maier	United Team of Germany	2:02:10.6
27	Mack Miller	United States	2:03:54.4
28	Marcel Huguenin	Switzerland	2:03:25.6
29	Rudolf Dannhauer	United Team of Germany	2:03:38.9
30	Rudolf Čillík	Czechoslovakia	2:03:50.6
31	Stefan Mitkov	Bulgaria	2:03:54.6
32	Lorenz Possa	Switzerland	2:05:41.2
33	Siegfried Huq	United Team of Germany	2:05:48.2
34	Józef Gąsienica-Sobczak	Poland	2:06:12.7
35	Takashi Matsuhashi	Japan	2:06:25.5
36	Clarence Servold	Canada	2:06:37.9
37	Kazuo Sato	Japan	2:07:07.2
38	John Moore	Great Britain	2:08:58.6
39	Eiji Kurita	Japan	2:11:25.8
40	Irvin Servold	Canada	2:11:50.4
41	Andrew Morgan	Great Britain	2:13:38.9
42	Leo Massa	United States	2:16:47.0
43	Joe Pete Wilson	United States	2:22:16.2
44	Francisco Jerman	Argentina	2:33:27.4
45	Kim Ha-Yun	South Korea	2:48:37.2
	Giuseppe Steiner	Italy	DNF
	Sven Johanson	United States	DNF
	Fritz Kocher	Switzerland	DNF
