= Hermann Mayr (skier) =

Austrian cross-country skier

Personal information
- Nationality: Austrian
- Born: 15 May 1929 Mutters, Austria

Sport
- Sport: Cross-country skiing

Hermann Mayr (born 15 May 1929) was an Austrian cross-country skier. He competed at the 1956 Winter Olympics and the 1964 Winter Olympics.
