= Fyodor Terentyev =

Soviet cross-country skier

Personal information
- Native name: Фёдор Михайлович Терентьев
- Full name: Fyodor Mikhaylovich Terentyev
- Born: 4 October 1925 Padany, Karelian ASSR, Soviet Union
- Died: 20 January 1963 (aged 37) Leningrad, Russian SFSR, Soviet Union

Sport
- Sport: Cross-country skiing
- Club: Armed Forces sports society, Moscow
Medal record
Representing the Soviet Union
Olympic Games
Gold medal – first place	1956 Cortina d'Ampezzo	4×10 km
Bronze medal – third place	1956 Cortina d'Ampezzo	50 km
World Championships
Silver medal – second place	1954 Falun	4×10 km
Silver medal – second place	1958 Lahti	4×10 km

Fyodor Mikhaylovich Terentyev (Russian: Фёдор Михайлович Терентьев; 4 October 1925 – 20 January 1963) was a Soviet cross-country skier who competed at the 1956 Winter Olympics. He won a gold medal in the 4×10 km relay and a bronze in the individual 50 km event, finishing sixth in the 30 km race. He also won two silver medals in the relay at the world championships in 1954 and 1958.

Terentyev was born in a large Karelian family of nine siblings and spoke Finnish. Although he skied since early age, he started training on a proper equipment only when he joined the Soviet Army in 1944. In 1950 he finished second in the 4×10 km relay at the Soviet Championships, and in 1951 placed third in the individual 18 and 30 km races; he won all these three events in 1954 and was included into the national team. At the 1956 Olympics he performed below expectations in his individual races, but was instrumental in winning the relay gold medal. He won two silver medals in the relay at the world championships in 1954 and 1958, and finished second in the 30 km at the 1960 Soviet championships, but was not selected for the 1960 Olympics because of his age (35). Aiming for the 1964 Olympics he intensified training and became the Soviet champion in the 50 km in 1962. Next year, after winning the 30 km race at the Soviet Army Championships, he collapsed and died on the way to hospital. He was 37 years old.
