= Vladimir Kuzin =

Soviet cross-country skier (1930-2007)

Medal record

Men's cross-country skiing

Representing Soviet Union

Olympic Games
Gold medal – first place	1956 Cortina d'Ampezzo	4 x 10 km

World Championships
Gold medal – first place	1954 Falun	30 km
Gold medal – first place	1954 Falun	50 km
Silver medal – second place	1954 Falun	4 x 10 km

Vladimir Semyonovich Kuzin (Russian: Владимир Семёнович Кузин; July 15, 1930 – October 5, 2007) was a former cross-country skier who competed in the Soviet Union during the 1950s, training at Dynamo in Leningrad. Born in Lampozhnya, Arkhangelsk Oblast, he earned a gold medal in the 4 x 10 km relay at the 1956 Winter Olympics in Cortina d'Ampezzo. He also finished 5th in the 30 km event in those same Olympics.

Kuzin's best successes were at the 1954 FIS Nordic World Ski Championships in Falun, where he earned two golds (30 km, 50 km) and one silver medal (4 x 10 km relay).

In 1957 he was awarded Order of Lenin. He defended a dissertation for the Candidate of Biological Science degree.
