= FIS Nordic World Ski Championships 1958 =

International Nordic skiing competition

- Official poster for the FIS Nordic World Ski Championships 1958. (in Finnish)
- Host city: Lahti
- Country: Finland
- Events: 8
- Opening: 1 March 1958
- Closing: 9 March 1958

The FIS Nordic World Ski Championships 1958 took place 2–9 March 1958 in Lahti, Finland. This marked the third time the city hosted this event having done so in 1926 and 1938. Germany returned to the FIS Nordic Ski Championships for the first time officially since 1939, albeit as East Germany and West Germany. Additionally, it was the first championships to electronic timekeeping where results were timed to the tenth of a second rather than the full second.

== Men's cross-country ==
=== 15 km ===
4 March 1958

Medal	Athlete	Time
Gold	Veikko Hakulinen (FIN)	48:58.3
Silver	Pavel Kolchin (URS)	49:11.8
Bronze	Anatoly Shelyukhin (URS)	49:29.4

=== 30 km ===
2 March 1958

Medal	Athlete	Time
Gold	Kalevi Hämäläinen (FIN)	1:40:03.0
Silver	Pavel Kolchin (URS)	1:40:15.2
Bronze	Sixten Jernberg (SWE)	1:40:44.4

=== 50 km ===
8 March 1958

Medal	Athlete	Time
Gold	Sixten Jernberg (SWE)	2:56:21.9
Silver	Veikko Hakulinen (FIN)	2:57:39.7
Bronze	Arvo Viitanen (FIN)	2:58:49.5

=== 4 x 10 km relay ===
8 March 1958

Medal	Team	Time
Gold	Sweden (Sixten Jernberg, Lennart Larsson, Sture Grahn, Per-Erik Larsson)	2:18:15.0
Silver	Soviet Union (Fyodor Terentyev, Nikolay Anikin, Anatoly Shelyukhin, Pavel Kolchin)	2:18:44.4
Bronze	Finland (Kalevi Hämäläinen, Arto Tiainen, Arvo Viitanen, Veikko Hakulinen)	2:19:23.2

== Women's cross-country ==
=== 10 km ===
5 March 1958

Medal	Athlete	Time
Gold	Alevtina Kolchina (URS)	44:49.0
Silver	Lyubov Kozyreva (URS)	45:28.2
Bronze	Siiri Rantanen (FIN)	46:02.8

=== 3 x 5 km relay ===
7 March 1958

Medal	Team	Time
Gold	Soviet Union (Radya Yeroshina, Alevtina Kolchina, Lyubov Kozyreva)	58:32.4
Silver	Finland (Toini Mikkola-Pöysti, Pirkko Korkee, Siiri Rantanen)	1:00:14.0
Bronze	Sweden (Märta Norberg, Irma Johansson, Sonja Edström)	1:01:58.5

== Men's Nordic combined ==
=== Individual ===
2-3 March 1958

Medal	Athlete	Points
Gold	Paavo Korhonen (FIN)	
Silver	Sverre Stenersen (NOR)	
Bronze	Gunder Gundersen (NOR)	

== Men's ski jumping ==
=== Individual large hill ===
9 March 1958

Medal	Athlete	Points
Gold	Juhani Kärkinen (FIN)	
Silver	Ensio Hyytiä (FIN)	
Bronze	Helmut Recknagel (GDR)	

== Medal table ==
Rank	Nation	Gold	Silver	Bronze	Total
1	Finland (FIN)	4	3	3	10
2	Soviet Union (URS)	2	4	1	7
3	Sweden (SWE)	2	0	2	4
4	Norway (NOR)	0	1	1	2
5	East Germany (GDR)	0	0	1	1
Totals (5 entries)		8	8	8	24
