= Mack Miller =

American cross country skier (1931–2020)

Personal information
- Full name: Andrew Markley Miller
- Born: October 15, 1931
- Died: February 16, 2020 (aged 88)
- Spouse: Rita Miller

Sport
- Sport: Skiing

Andrew Markley "Mack" Miller (October 15, 1931 – February 16, 2020) was an American cross-country skier, trainer, and high school teacher. He represented the United States twice at the Winter Olympics. The son of a children's fiction writer (and of a newspaper editor who had died young), he was a topic of one of his mother's books and of a later book by Eve Chandler.

== Career ==
Miller studied at Western State College of Colorado. He represented the university in various cross-country skiing tournaments.

Miller was the national champion in cross-country skiing of 1955 and represented the United States in the Winter Olympics of 1956 and 1960.

In 1955, he was the highest-ranked American cross-country skier in the Nordic Championship. Along with Sven Johansson from Anchorage, Mack Miller was the most prominent American cross-country skier of his era. (Sven Johansson, however, could represent the United States only in the 1960 Olympics because of his naturalization process.)

=== Highlights ===
- 1956 –– Competed in Olympic Men's 4x10 km Cross-country Ski Relay, ranked 12th with personal time in the 2nd leg of 0:37:22 and total team time of 2:32:04. Relay teammates were Ted Farwell, Larry Damon and Marvin Crawford.

== Family and legacy ==
Miller was born in Salt Lake City. He was the son of children's fiction author Helen Markley Miller. Mack and his sport formed the inspiration for Helen's sixth novel, Ski fast, ski long (1960). He wais also featured in the 2012 book Brundage Mountain – Best Snow in Idaho by Eve Chandler.

Miller and his wife Rita lived in Idaho. They had a son, Ralph, and a daughter, Karla. Miller died on February 16, 2020, at the age of 88.
