= Nikolay Anikin =

Soviet cross-country skier (1932–2009)

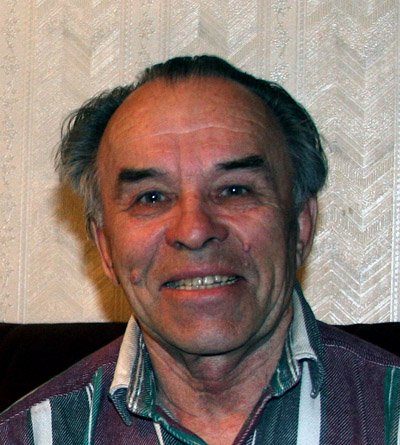

Medal record

Men's cross-country skiing

Representing Soviet Union

Olympic Games
Gold medal – first place	1956 Cortina d'Ampezzo	4 x 10 km
Bronze medal – third place	1960 Squaw Valley	4 x 10 km
Bronze medal – third place	1960 Squaw Valley	30 km

World Championships
Silver medal – second place	1958 Lahti	4 x 10 km

Nikolay Petrovich Anikin (Russian: Николай Петрович Аникин; also transliterated as Nikolai or Nikolaj; 25 January 1932 – 14 November 2009) was a Soviet cross-country skier who competed during the late 1950s and early 1960s, training at Dynamo in Moscow. He was born in Ishim, Tyumen Oblast, Russia, USSR.

== Medals ==
He earned three medals at the Winter Olympics with two medals in the 4x10 km relay (gold: 1956, bronze: 1960) and a bronze in the 30 km (1960). He also earned a silver medal in the 4x10 km relay at the 1958 FIS Nordic World Ski Championships.

== Awards ==
He was awarded Order of the Badge of Honor (1957).

== Coaching career ==
In 1963 Anikin started coaching for the Soviet national junior and senior teams with whom he spent 27 years ultimately becoming head coach. He moved to Salt Lake City, UT in 1990 to coach the U.S. National Team, then to Marquette, MI to work at an Olympic training program. He settled in Duluth MN in 1994 where he coached elite, masters and junior skiers for the remainder of his career.

== Death ==
Anikin died from cancer at his home in Duluth, Minnesota, aged 77.
