= Siegfried Weiß (skier) =

German cross-country skier (1933–2013)

Personal information
- Nationality: German
- Born: 18 December 1933; Furtwangen im Schwarzwald, Germany
- Died: 13 March 2013 (aged 79); Simonswald, Germany

Sport
- Sport: Cross-country skiing

Siegfried Weiß (18 December 1933 – 13 March 2013) was a German cross-country skier. He competed at the 1956, 1960, 1964 and the 1968 Winter Olympics.
