= Cross-country skiing at the 1956 Winter Olympics =

Cross-country skiing at the VII Olympic Winter Games
- Venue: Lo Stadio della neve
- Dates: 27 January – 4 February
- No. of events: 6
- Competitors: 150 from 20 nations

At the 1956 Winter Olympics six cross-country skiing events – four for men and two for women – were contested after men's 30 km and women's 3 × 5 km relay were added. The competitions were held from Friday, 27 January, to Sunday, 4 February 1956.

== Medal summary ==
=== Medal table ===
Rank	Nation	Gold	Silver	Bronze	Total
1	Soviet Union	2	2	3	7
2	Finland	2	2	0	4
3	Sweden	1	2	3	6
4	Norway	1	0	0	1
Totals (4 entries)		6	6	6	18

=== Men's events ===
Event	Gold	Silver	Bronze
15 km	Hallgeir Brenden; Norway	Sixten Jernberg; Sweden	Pavel Kolchin; Soviet Union
30 km	Veikko Hakulinen; Finland	Sixten Jernberg; Sweden	Pavel Kolchin; Soviet Union
50 km	Sixten Jernberg; Sweden	Veikko Hakulinen; Finland	Fyodor Terentyev; Soviet Union
4 × 10 km relay	Soviet Union; Fyodor Terentyev; Pavel Kolchin; Nikolay Anikin; Vladimir Kuzin	Finland; August Kiuru; Jorma Kortelainen; Arvo Viitanen; Veikko Hakulinen	Sweden; Lennart Larsson; Gunnar Samuelsson; Per-Erik Larsson; Sixten Jernberg

=== Women's events ===
Event	Gold	Silver	Bronze
10 km	Lyubov Kozyreva; Soviet Union	Radia Yeroshina; Soviet Union	Sonja Edström; Sweden
3 × 5 km relay	Finland; Sirkka Polkunen; Mirja Hietamies; Siiri Rantanen	Soviet Union; Lyubov Kozyreva; Alevtina Kolchina; Radya Yeroshina	Sweden; Irma Johansson; Anna-Lisa Eriksson; Sonja Edström

== Participating nations ==
- Austria (4)
- Bulgaria (4)
- Canada (1)
- Czechoslovakia (9)
- Finland (15)
- France (6)
- United Team of Germany (11)
- Great Britain (8)
- Iceland (2)
- Italy (14)
- Japan (1)
- Lebanon (1)
- Norway (12)
- Poland (9)
- Romania (7)
- Soviet Union (11)
- Sweden (11)
- Switzerland (11)
- United States (5)
- Yugoslavia (9)
