= Holmenkollen 50 km =

Cross-country skiing race in Oslo, Norway

- Frequency: annually
- Venue: Holmenkollen National Arena
- Locations: Holmenkollen, Oslo, Norway
- Inaugurated: 1898
- Major events: Cross-country skiing
- Organiser: Holmenkollen Ski Festival

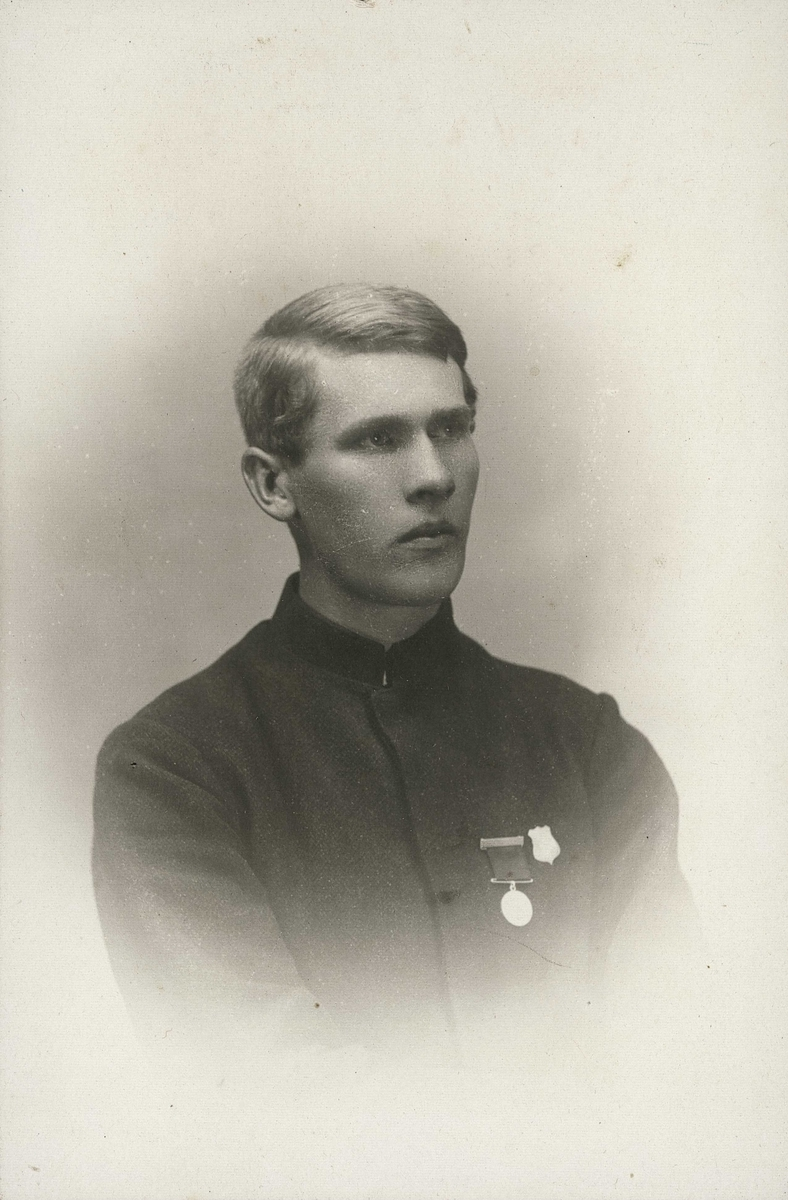
Lauritz Bergendahl won the 50 km five times (1910, 1912, 1913, 1914 and 1915). Photo: Gabrielsen, ca. 1910 (Oslo Museum / Digitalt Museum)

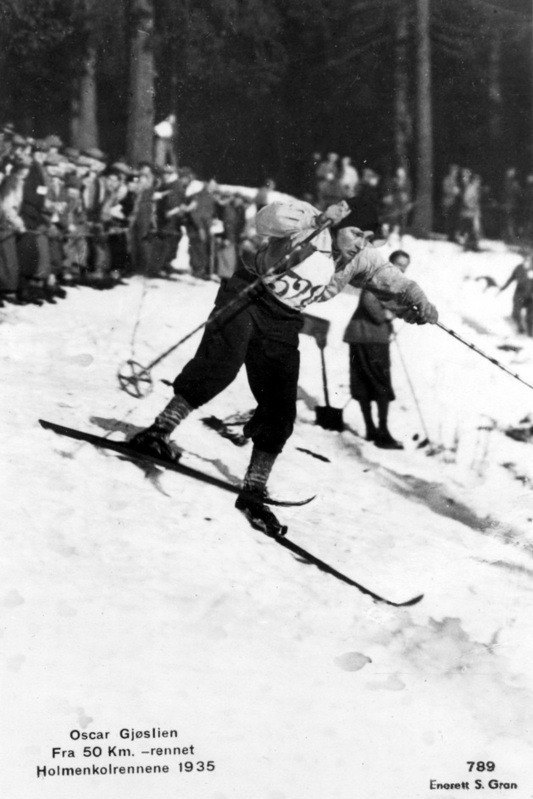
Oscar Gjøslien photographed during his 50 km winning race in the 1935 edition. Photo: S. Gran (Oslo Museum / Digitalt Museum)

The Holmenkollen 50 km is an annual cross-country skiing race held at Holmenkollen National Arena in Oslo, Norway. The competition is part of the Holmenkollen Ski Festival. Prior to 2023, the 50 km distance was raced by men only as the women's equivalent was a 30 km race. Since the 2023 edition, both men and women have raced 50k.

== History ==
The first 50 km race in Oslo was planned to be part of Husebyrennet i 1887, but was first held in 1888. Torjus Hemmestveit won the inaugural 50 km race. 17 skiers started the race, 12 finished. The course consisted of two laps of 25 km and started at the velodrome at Majorstuen.

The next long-distance race, a 30 km, was planned to be part of Holmenkollrennene in 1898, but was cancelled due to lack of snow. 30 km races were held in 1900 and 1901, and the winners of these races are widely recognised as Holmenkollen 50 km winners. Also the winner of the 1907 edition is recognised as a winner, even though the course length was only 40 km. The first Holmenkollen 50 km race was held in 1902. The course consisted of two laps of 25 kilometres, both started and finished at Frognerseteren. For safety reasons, all skiers had to stop for a five-minute rest. These required pauses was only mandatory in the 1902 edition.

In 1905, the 50 km race was again cancelled due to lack of snow. Holmenkollrennene (later known as Holmenkollen Ski Festival) were in 1909 a part of a common arrangement with the first Norwegian Championships in cross-country skiing, and since a 30 km race was held at Lillehammer in these championships, the 50 km race in Holmenkollen was not held. The first foreign competitors at the Holmenkollen 50 km were a number of Swedes participating in 1903. The first non-Norwegian to win the race was Finnish skier Anton Collin in 1922. Tapani Niku, also from Finland, finished in second place.

In 1925 was the 50 km cancelled due to lack of snow in the days before Holmenkollrennene. Holmenkollrennene was threatened by lack of snow also in 1932, but was held two weeks after schedule. Holmenkollrennene, including the 50 km were not held during the Second World War.

Oslo arranged the World Championships in 1930, 1966, 1982 and 2011. In all the World Championships held in Oslo, the Holmenkollen 50 km was arranged as a part of the World Championships. In 1952, a separate 50 km race was held two weeks after the 1952 Winter Olympics in Oslo. The individual races in the 1982 World Championships were a part of the 1981–82 Cross-Country World Cup, the first official World Cup season, and the Holmenkollen 50 km race has since been a part of the World Cup, with the exception in 1985 when the 50 km did not have World Cup status. The cross-country skiing events at the 2011 World Championships were not part of the World Cup, unlike the 1982 World Championships.

In the 1985–86 season, cross-country skiing started to distinguish techniques and arrange separate races in classic style and freestyle (skating). The 50 km in Holmenkollen has since been arranged in both techniques. Lack of snow hindered the Holmenkollrennene again in 1990 and 1992, which caused the 50 km to be moved to Vang. Lillehammer hosted the 1994 Winter Olympics, and no 50 km race was held in Holmenkollen that year. The Holmenkollen National Arena was reconstructed in 2009 to prepare for the 2011 World Championships and the 50 km was therefore replaced by a World Cup race in Trondheim. Since 2010, the Holmenkollen 50 km has been competed with a mass start.

There was no race in 2021. It resumed the next year.

== Records ==
Lauritz Bergendahl has the three biggest winning margins in the Holmenkollen 50 km. In 1914, he won by 22 minutes 39 seconds down to Elling Rønes. The following year, Bergendahl skied 21 minutes 36 seconds faster than second-placed Embret Mellesmo. He won by 17 minutes and 15 seconds down to Truls Braathen in 1912. The smallest winning margin from races held with individual start are the two seconds between winner Veikko Hakulinen and Pavel Kolchin in 1955. In mass starts, where the winning margins often are small, the smallest winning margin is a photo finish in 2015 where Sjur Røthe won ahead of Dario Cologna even though they finished in the same time.

The longest winning time for 50 km in Holmenkollen is 5 hours 33 minutes 37 seconds, when Elling Rønes won in 1906. The shortest winning time is Sjur Røthe's time in 2015: 1:54.44,9.

Alexander Bolshunov is the youngest winner of the race, aged 22 years and 68 days when winning the 2019 edition.

Thorleif Haug has the most victories with six; in 1918, 1919, 1920, 1921, 1923 and 1924. Lauritz Bergendahl won five times; in 1910, 1912, 1913, 1914 and 1915. Elling Rønes won four times; 1906, 1907, 1908 and 1916. After the Second World War, five skiers have won three times each: Veikko Hakulinen won in 1952 (Olympic Games), 1953 and 1955, Sverre Stensheim won in 1959, 1960 and 1961, Oddvar Brå won in 1975, 1979 and 1981, Thomas Wassberg won in 1980, 1982 and 1987, and Vegard Ulvang won in 1989, 1991 and 1992.

=== Multiple winners ===
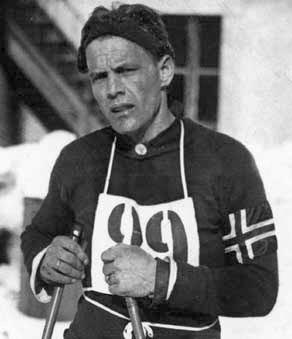
Thorleif Haug won the 50 km a record six times (1918, 1919, 1920, 1921, 1923 og 1924).

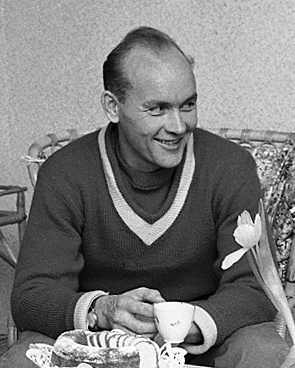
Veikko Hakulinen is the first non-Norwegian to win the 50 km three times.

The following skiers have won the Holmenkollen 50 km at least twice.

Multiple winners of the Holmenkollen 50 km
| Skier | Total | Editions |
|---|---|---|
| Thorleif Haug (NOR) | 6 | 1918, 1919, 1920, 1921, 1923, 1924 |
| Lauritz Bergendahl (NOR) | 5 | 1910, 1912, 1913, 1914, 1915 |
| Elling Rønes (NOR) | 4 | 1906, 1907, 1908, 1916 |
| Oddvar Brå (NOR) | 3 | 1975, 1979, 1981 |
| Veikko Hakulinen (FIN) | 3 | 1952, 1953, 1955 |
| Sverre Stensheim (NOR) | 3 | 1959, 1960, 1961 |
| Vegard Ulvang (NOR) | 3 | 1989, 1991, 1992 |
| Thomas Wassberg (SWE) | 3 | 1980, 1982, 1987 |
| Alexander Bolshunov (RUS) | 2 | 2019, 2020 |
| Paul Braaten (NOR) | 2 | 1900, 1901 |
| Gerhard Grimmer (GDR) | 2 | 1970, 1971 |
| Karl Hovelsen (NOR) | 2 | 1902, 1903 |
| Nils Karlsson (SWE) | 2 | 1947, 1951 |
| Petter Northug (NOR) | 2 | 2010, 2011 |
| Alexey Prokurorov (RUS) | 2 | 1993, 1998 |
| Assar Rönnlund (SWE) | 2 | 1962, 1968 |
| Anders Södergren (SWE) | 2 | 2006, 2008 |
| Martin Johnsrud Sundby (NOR) | 2 | 2016, 2017 |
| Gunde Svan (SWE) | 2 | 1986, 1990 |
| Arto Tiainen (FIN) | 2 | 1964, 1965 |
| Pål Tyldum (NOR) | 2 | 1969, 1972 |
| Sven Utterström (SWE) | 2 | 1929, 1930 |
| Andrus Veerpalu (EST) | 2 | 2003, 2005 |

== Results ==
The distance is 50 km unless otherwise noted. The 1888 50 km race was a part of Husebyrennet, but is included in this list for completeness reasons.

| Date | Course / technique | Winner | Second | Third | Type |
|---|---|---|---|---|---|
| 7 February 1888 | | (Norway) Torjus Hemmestveit | (Norway) Peder Eliassen | (Norway) Nils Kamphaug | Husebyrennet |
| 1898 | 30 km | Cancelled due to lack of snow | | | Holmenkollrennene |
| 7 February 1900 | 30 km | (Norway) Paul Braaten | (Norway) Gustav Bye | (Norway) Johs. Bentzen | Holmenkollrennene |
| 6 February 1901 | 30 km | (Norway) Paul Braaten | (Norway) Halvard Hansen | (Norway) Thorvald Moestue | Holmenkollrennene |
| 5 February 1902 | | (Norway) Karl Hovelsen | (Norway) Paul Braaten | (Norway) Halvard Hansen | Holmenkollrennene |
| 4 February 1903 | 55 km | (Norway) Karl Hovelsen | (Norway) Per Andreassen | (Norway) Karl Sonerud | Holmenkollrennene, the Nordic Games |
| 10 February 1904 | | (Norway) Per Bakken | (Norway) Per Andreassen | (Norway) Otto Rønningen | Holmenkollrennene |
| 1905 | | Cancelled due to lack of snow | | | Holmenkollrennene |
| 8 March 1906 | | (Norway) Elling Rønes | (Norway) Helenus Bakken | (Norway) Per Bakken | Holmenkollrennene |
| 28 February 1907 | 40 km | (Norway) Elling Rønes | (Norway) Jens Skjærbæk | (Norway) Andreas Udbye | Holmenkollrennene |
| 20. February 1908 | 47.8 km | (Norway) Elling Rønes | (Norway) Olav Bjaaland | (Norway) Jens Skjærbæk | Holmenkollrennene |
| 1909 | | Not held | | | Holmenkollrennene |
| 17 February 1910 | | (Norway) Lauritz Bergendahl | (Norway) Truls Braathen | (Norway) Arne Hallén | Holmenkollrennene |
| 2 March 1911 | | (Norway) Truls Braathen | (Norway) Embret Mellesmo | (Norway) Elling Rønes | Holmenkollrennene |
| 29 February 1912 | | (Norway) Lauritz Bergendahl | (Norway) Truls Braathen | (Norway) Andreas Vesterhaug | Holmenkollrennene |
| 27 February 1913 | | (Norway) Lauritz Bergendahl | (Norway) Johan Kristoffersen | (Norway) Embret Mellesmo | Holmenkollrennene |
| 26 February 1914 | | (Norway) Lauritz Bergendahl | (Norway) Elling Rønes | (Finland) Anders Brännkärr | Holmenkollrennene |
| 25 February 1915 | | (Norway) Lauritz Bergendahl | (Norway) Embret Mellesmo | (Finland) Anders Brännkärr | Holmenkollrennene |
| 24 February 1916 | | (Norway) Elling Rønes | (Norway) Ingvar Langlien | (Norway) Johan Skjærbæk | Holmenkollrennene |
| 22 February 1917 | | (Norway) Ingvar Langlien | (Norway) Elling Rønes | (Norway) Amund Vanvik | Holmenkollrennene |
| 21 February 1918 | | (Norway) Thorleif Haug | (Sweden) G. Johanson | (Sweden) Henning Isaksson | Holmenkollrennene |
| 27 February 1919 | | (Norway) Thorleif Haug | (Norway) Ingvar Langlien | (Sweden) Henning Isaksson | Holmenkollrennene |
| 19 February 1920 | | (Norway) Thorleif Haug | (Norway) Johan Grøttumsbråten | (Sweden) Torkel Persson | Holmenkollrennene |
| 17 February 1921 | | (Norway) Thorleif Haug | (Norway) Thoralf Strømstad | (Norway) Johan Grøttumsbråten | Holmenkollrennene |
| 23 February 1922 | | (Finland) Anton Collin | (Finland) Tapani Niku | (Norway) Hagbart Haakonsen | Holmenkollrennene |
| 22 February 1923 | | (Norway) Thorleif Haug | (Norway) Harald Økern | (Norway) Thoralf Strømstad | Holmenkollrennene |
| 21 February 1924 | | (Norway) Thorleif Haug | (Norway) Ole Hegge | (Norway) Jon Mårdalen | Holmenkollrennene |
| 1925 | | Cancelled due to lack of snow | | | Holmenkollrennene |
| 24 February 1926 | | (Norway) Olav Kjelbotn | (Norway) Ole Hegge | (Norway) Ole Stenen | Holmenkollrennene |
| 2 March 1927 | | (Norway) Henry Gjøslien | (Norway) Ole Hegge | (Norway) Lars Lørdahl | Holmenkollrennene |
| 29 February 1928 | | (Finland) Martti Lappalainen | (Norway) Kristian Hovde | (Norway) Hagbart Haakonsen | Holmenkollrennene |
| 27 February 1929 | | (Sweden) Sven Utterström | (Norway) Arne Rustadstuen | (Sweden) Per-Erik Hedlund | Holmenkollrennene |
| 3 March 1930 | | (Sweden) Sven Utterström | (Norway) Arne Rustadstuen | (Finland) Adiel Paananen | 1930 World Championships |
| 25 February 1931 | | (Norway) Ole Stenen | (Norway) Kolbjørn Sevre | (Norway) Oscar Aas Haugen | Holmenkollrennene |
| 15 March 1932 | | (Norway) Gjermund Muruåsen | (Norway) Olav Lian | (Norway) Oscar Gjøslien | Holmenkollrennene |
| 1 March 1933 | | (Norway) Sigurd Vestad | (Norway) Annar Ryen | (Norway) Konrad Nordfjellmark | Holmenkollrennene |
| 5 March 1934 | | (Finland) Kalle Heikkinen | (Norway) Lars Bergendahl | (Norway) Trygve Brodahl | Holmenkollrennene |
| 27 February 1935 | | (Norway) Oscar Gjøslien | (Norway) John Johnsen | (Norway) Per Samuelshaug | Holmenkollrennene |
| 26 February 1936 | | (Norway) Per Sætermyrmoen | (Norway) Andreas Hverven | (Finland) Valmari Toikka | Holmenkollrennene |
| 24 February 1937 | | (Norway) Per Samuelshaug | (Sweden) Nils Englund | (Norway) Oscar Gjøslien | Holmenkollrennene |
| 7 March 1938 | | (Finland) Pekka Niemi | (Finland) Pekka Vanninen | (Norway) Oscar Gjøslien | Holmenkollrennene |
| 6 March 1939 | | (Sweden) Sven Edin | (Norway) Lars Bergendahl | (Sweden) Mauritz Brännström | Holmenkollrennene |
| 28 February 1940 | | (Norway) Lars Bergendahl | (Norway) Annar Ryen | (Sweden) Arthur Häggblad | Holmenkollrennene |
| 1941–1945 | | Not held due to World War II | | | Holmenkollrennene |
| 27 February 1946 | | (Norway) Arve Ulseth | (Norway) Thorleif Vangen | (Norway) Leif Haugen | Holmenkollrennene |
| 26 February 1947 | | (Sweden) Nils Karlsson | (Sweden) Arthur Herrdin | (Norway) Martin Jære | Holmenkollrennene |
| 3 March 1948 | | (Sweden) Harald Eriksson | (Norway) Hallvard Eggset | (Sweden) Lennart Berg | Holmenkollrennene |
| 2 March 1949 | | (Sweden) Nils Östensson | (Sweden) Sigvard Jonsson | (Norway) Harald Maartmann | Holmenkollrennene |
| 1 March 1950 | | (Sweden) Anders Törnqvist | (Norway) Harald Maartmann | (Sweden) Gunnar Karlsson | Holmenkollrennene |
| 24 February 1951 | | (Sweden) Nils Karlsson | (Finland) Eero Kolehmainen | (Norway) Magnar Estenstad | Holmenkollrennene |
| 20 February 1952 | | (Finland) Veikko Hakulinen | (Finland) Eero Kolehmainen | (Norway) Magnar Estenstad | 1952 Winter Olympics |
| 8 March 1952 | | (Norway) Magnar Estenstad | (Norway) Edvin Landsem | (Norway) Harald Maartmann | Holmenkollrennet |
| 28 February 1953 | | (Finland) Veikko Hakulinen | (Finland) Martti Lautala | (Finland) Arvo Viitanen | Holmenkollrennet |
| 6 March 1954 | | (Norway) Martin Stokken | (Sweden) Sixten Jernberg | (Finland) Eero Kolehmainen | Holmenkollrennet |
| 5 March 1955 | | (Finland) Veikko Hakulinen | (Soviet Union) Pavel Kolchin | (Soviet Union) Viktor Baranov | Holmenkollrennet |
| 25 February 1956 | | (Finland) Arvo Viitanen | (Norway) Hallgeir Brenden | (Norway) Erling Bjørn | Holmenkollrennet |
| 2 March 1957 | | (Finland) Eero Kolehmainen | (Finland) Veikko Hakulinen | (Norway) Martin Stokken | Holmenkollrennet |
| 15 March 1958 | | (Soviet Union) Pavel Kolchin | (Finland) Eljas Koistinen | (Norway) Hallgeir Brenden | Holmenkollrennet |
| 7 March 1959 | | (Norway) Sverre Stensheim | (Finland) Eero Kolehmainen | (Finland) Veikko Räsänen | Holmenkollrennet |
| 19 March 1960 | | (Norway) Sverre Stensheim | (Norway) Oddmund Jensen | (Norway) Ingmund Holtås | Holmenkollrennet |
| 11 March 1961 | | (Norway) Sverre Stensheim | (Norway) Hallgeir Brenden | (Sweden) Sture Grahn | Holmenkollrennet |
| 17 March 1962 | | (Sweden) Assar Rönnlund | (Norway) Reidar Hjermstad | (Finland) Raimo Hämälainen | Holmenkollrennet |
| 16 March 1963 | | (Sweden) Ragnar Persson | (Norway) Einar Østby | (Norway) Ole Ellefsæter | Holmenkollrennet |
| 14 March 1964 | | (Finland) Arto Tiainen | (Sweden) Sixten Jernberg | (Norway) Gjermund Eggen | Holmenkollrennet |
| 13 March 1965 | | (Finland) Arto Tiainen | (Norway) Ole Ellefsæter | (Finland) Raimo Hämälainen | Holmenkollrennet |
| 26 February 1966 | | (Norway) Gjermund Eggen | (Finland) Arto Tiainen | (Finland) Eero Mäntyranta | 1966 World Championships |
| 4 March 1967 | | (Norway) Ole Ellefsæter | (Finland) Arto Tiainen | (Norway) Odd Martinsen | Holmenkollrennene |
| 16 March 1968 | | (Sweden) Assar Rönnlund | (Norway) Pål Tyldum | (Norway) Gjermund Eggen | Holmenkollrennene |
| 15 March 1969 | | (Norway) Pål Tyldum | (Norway) Johs. Harviken | (Norway) Magne Myrmo | Holmenkollrennene |
| 14 March 1970 | | (East Germany) Gerhard Grimmer | (Norway) Pål Tyldum | (Finland) Hannu Taipale | Holmenkollrennene |
| 13 March 1971 | | (East Germany) Gerhard Grimmer | (Sweden) Lars-Arne Bölling | (Sweden) Lennart Pettersson | Holmenkollrennene |
| 11 March 1972 | | (Norway) Pål Tyldum | (Sweden) Lars-Arne Bölling | (Norway) Ole Ellefsæter | Holmenkollrennene |
| 17 March 1973 | | (Finland) Juha Mieto | (Norway) Oddvar Brå | (Norway) Pål Tyldum | Holmenkollrennene |
| 9 March 1974 | | (Norway) Magne Myrmo | (Norway) Ivar Formo | (Finland) Juha Mieto | Holmenkollrennene |
| 8 March 1975 | | (Norway) Oddvar Brå | (Norway) Ivar Formo | (Norway) Magne Myrmo | Holmenkollrennene |
| 13 March 1976 | | (Sweden) Sven-Åke Lundbäck | (Finland) Juha Mieto | (Finland) Arto Koivisto | Holmenkollrennene |
| 12 March 1977 | | (Sweden) Thomas Magnuson | (Norway) Ivar Formo | (Finland) Juha Mieto | Holmenkollrennene |
| 11 March 1978 | | (Finland) Matti Pitkänen | (Norway) Magne Myrmo | (Finland) Juhani Repo | Holmenkollrennene |
| 10 March 1979 | | (Norway) Oddvar Brå | (Norway) Per Knut Aaland | (Sweden) Thomas Wassberg | Holmenkollrennene |
| 15 March 1980 | | (Sweden) Thomas Wassberg | (Norway) Per Knut Aaland | (Norway) Jan Lindvall | Holmenkollrennene |
| 14 March 1981 | | (Norway) Oddvar Brå | (Soviet Union) Alexander Zavyalov | (Norway) Ove Aunli | Holmenkollrennene |
| 27 February 1982 | | (Sweden) Thomas Wassberg | (Soviet Union) Yuriy Burlakov | (Norway) Lars Erik Eriksen | 1982 World Championships/World Cup |
| 12 March 1983 | | (Finland) Asko Autio | (Norway) Per Knut Aaland | (Sweden) Gunde Svan | World Cup |
| 10 March 1984 | | (Norway) Tor Håkon Holte | (Soviet Union) Vladimir Sakhnov | (Sweden) Gunde Svan | World Cup |
| 16 March 1985 | | (Norway) Geir Holte | (Norway) Arild Monsen | (Norway) Per Knut Aaland | Holmenkollrennene |
| 15 March 1986 | Classic | (Sweden) Gunde Svan | (Sweden) Torgny Mogren | (Norway) Vegard Ulvang | World Cup |
| 21 March 1987 | Classic | (Sweden) Thomas Wassberg | (Norway) Per Knut Aaland | (Sweden) Thomas Eriksson | World Cup |
| 19 March 1988 | Freestyle | (Canada) Pierre Harvey | (Italy) Silvano Barco | (Italy) Maurilio De Zolt | World Cup |
| 4 March 1989 | Classic | (Norway) Vegard Ulvang | (East Germany) Holger Bauroth | (Sweden) Torgny Mogren | World Cup |
| 17 March 1990 | Freestyle | (Sweden) Gunde Svan | (Sweden) Torgny Mogren | (Italy) Alfred Runggaldier | World Cup, held at Vang |
| 16 March 1991 | Classic | (Norway) Vegard Ulvang | (Finland) Harri Kirvesniemi | (Norway) Sture Sivertsen | World Cup |
| 14 March 1992 | Classic | (Norway) Vegard Ulvang | (Commonwealth of Independent States) Mikhail Botvinov | (Czechoslovakia) Luboš Buchta | World Cup, held at Vang |
| 13 March 1993 | Classic | (Russia) Alexey Prokurorov | (Norway) Gudmund Skjeldal | (Norway) Sture Sivertsen | World Cup |
| 1994 | | Not held (1994 Winter Olympics at Lillehammer) | | | |
| 11 February 1995 | Classic | (Kazakhstan) Vladimir Smirnov | (Russia) Alexey Prokurorov | (Russia) Mikhail Botvinov | World Cup |
| 16 March 1996 | Classic | (Norway) Erling Jevne | (Norway) Krister Sørgård | (Sweden) Anders Bergström | World Cup |
| 15 March 1997 | Freestyle | (Italy) Pietro Piller Cottrer | (Norway) Tor-Arne Hetland | (Norway) Bjørn Dæhlie | World Cup |
| 14 March 1998 | Classic | (Russia) Alexey Prokurorov | (Norway) Odd-Bjørn Hjelmeset | (Norway) Bjørn Dæhlie | World Cup |
| 20 March 1999 | Freestyle | (Austria) Mikhail Botvinov | (Norway) Bjørn Dæhlie | (Austria) Christian Hoffmann | World Cup |
| 11 March 2000 | Classic | (Finland) Harri Kirvesniemi | (Russia) Mikhail Ivanov | (Austria) Mikhail Botvinov | World Cup |
| 10 March 2001 | Classic | (Sweden) Per Elofsson | (Norway) Anders Aukland | (Norway) Frode Estil | World Cup |
| 16 March 2002 | Freestyle | (Norway) Thomas Alsgaard | (Norway) Kristen Skjeldal | (Italy) Pietro Piller Cottrer | World Cup |
| 8 March 2003 | Classic | (Estonia) Andrus Veerpalu | (Norway) Anders Aukland | (Russia) Andrey Nutrikhin | World Cup |
| 28 February 2004 | Freestyle | (Germany) René Sommerfeldt | (Italy) Fulvio Valbusa | (Czech Republic) Lukáš Bauer | World Cup |
| 12 March 2005 | Classic | (Estonia) Andrus Veerpalu | (Germany) Jens Filbrich | (Norway) Odd-Bjørn Hjelmeset | World Cup |
| 11 March 2006 | Freestyle | (Sweden) Anders Södergren | (Italy) Giorgio Di Centa | (Germany) Tom Reichelt | World Cup |
| 17 March 2007 | Classic | (Norway) Odd-Bjørn Hjelmeset | (Germany) Tobias Angerer | (Norway) Frode Estil | World Cup |
| 8 March 2008 | Freestyle | (Sweden) Anders Södergren | (Czech Republic) Lukáš Bauer | (Switzerland) Remo Fischer | World Cup |
| 14 March 2009 (in Trondheim, because of reconstruction of the Holmenkollen National Arena) | Classic | (Finland) Sami Jauhojärvi | (Germany) Tobias Angerer | (Canada) Alex Harvey | World Cup |
| 13 March 2010 | Freestyle, mass start | (Norway) Petter Northug | (Italy) Pietro Piller Cottrer | (France) Vincent Vittoz | World Cup |
| 6. March 2011 | Freestyle, mass start | (Norway) Petter Northug | (Russia) Maxim Vylegzhanin | (Norway) Tord Asle Gjerdalen | 2011 World Championships |
| 10 March 2012 | Classic, mass start | (Norway) Eldar Rønning | (Switzerland) Dario Cologna | (Norway) Martin Johnsrud Sundby | World Cup |
| 16 March 2013 | Freestyle, mass start | (Russia) Alexander Legkov | (Norway) Martin Johnsrud Sundby | (Russia) Ilia Chernousov | World Cup |
| 8 March 2014 | Classic, mass start | (Sweden) Daniel Rickardsson | (Norway) Martin Johnsrud Sundby | (Russia) Alexander Legkov | World Cup |
| 14 March 2015 | Freestyle, mass start | (Norway) Sjur Røthe | (Switzerland) Dario Cologna | (Norway) Martin Johnsrud Sundby | World Cup |
| 6 February 2016 | Classic, mass start | (Norway) Martin Johnsrud Sundby | (Norway) Niklas Dyrhaug | (Russia) Maxim Vylegzhanin | World Cup |
| 11 March 2017 | Classic, mass start | (Norway) Martin Johnsrud Sundby | (Finland) Iivo Niskanen | (Russia) Alexander Bessmertnykh | World Cup |
| 10 March 2018 | Freestyle, mass start | (Switzerland) Dario Cologna | (Norway) Martin Johnsrud Sundby | (Russia) Maxim Vylegzhanin | World Cup |
| 9 March 2019 | Classic, mass start | (Russia) Alexander Bolshunov | (Russia) Maxim Vylegzhanin | (Russia) Andrey Larkov | World Cup |
| 8 March 2020 | Classic, mass start | (Russia) Alexander Bolshunov | (Norway) Simen Hegstad Krüger | (Norway) Emil Iversen | World Cup |
| 6 March 2022 | Classic, mass start | (Norway) Martin Løwstrøm Nyenget | (Norway) Sjur Røthe | (Norway) Didrik Tønseth | World Cup |
| 11 March 2023 | Freestyle, mass start | (Norway) Simen Hegstad Krüger | (Norway) Hans Christer Holund | (Norway) Martin Løwstrøm Nyenget | World Cup |
| 10 March 2024 | Classic, mass start | (Norway) Johannes Høsflot Klæbo | (Norway) Martin Løwstrøm Nyenget | (Norway) Pål Golberg | World Cup |
| 14 March 2026 | Freestyle, mass start | (Norway) Einar Hedegart | (Norway) Harald Østberg Amundsen | (Norway) Martin Løwstrøm Nyenget | World Cup |

== See also ==
- List of multiple winners at the Holmenkollen Ski Festival

== Sources ==
- Jakob Vaage, Tom Kristensen: Holmenkollen – Historien og resultatene. De norske Bokklubbene, Stabekk 1992. ISBN 82-525-1678-5 (p. 191-205 og 247-259, digitalised by Nasjonalbiblioteket)
- Foreningen til Ski-Idrættens Fremme gjennem 50 år 1883-1933. Dybwad, Oslo 1933 (s. 32-34, 52, 54-86, 236-238, digitalised by Nasjonalbiblioteket)
- Erling Ranheim (red.): Norske skiløpere - Skihistorisk oppslagsverk i 5 bind - Østlandet Sør. Skiforlaget - Erling Ranheim, Oslo 1956 (p. 38-39 og 120, digitalised by Nasjonalbiblioteket)
- FIS: Resultater (accessed 15 March 2015)
