= Furnes SF =

Norwegian skiing club

Logo.

Furnes Skiløperforening is a Norwegian skiing club from Ringsaker Municipality in Innlandet county.

The club was founded on 24 January 1892. It was a founding member of the Norwegian Ski Federation in 1908 and a leading club in Norway at the time, with Albert Larsen winning the King's Cup in Holmenkollen in 1908; Lars Høgvold the Ladies' Cup and the Holmenkollen Medal.

Several summer sport codes were added; football in 1932, handball in 1946 and also athletics and orienteering. In 1945 Furnes SF merged with the AIF club Furnes AIL to form Furnes IL. The various sport codes were later demerged and Furnes SF was reformed.
