= Holmen (surname) =

Holmen or Holmén is a Nordic surname that may refer to:

- Dag Holmen-Jensen (born 1954), Norwegian ski jumper
- Janne Holmén (born 1977), Finnish long-distance runner
- Jonas Holmen (1868–1953), Norwegian Nordic skier
- Kim Holmen (born 1982), Norwegian football striker
- Kjersti Holmen (1956–2021), Norwegian actress
- Nina Holmén (born 1951), Finnish long-distance runner, mother of Janne
- Rasmus Holmen (born 1993), Swedish ice hockey player
- Samuel Holmén (born 1984), Swedish football player
- Sebastian Holmén (born 1992), Swedish football player
- Stefan Holmén (born 1967), Swedish curler
- Tobias Holmen Johansen (born 1990), Norwegian football player
- Unni Holmen (born 1952), Norwegian Olympic gymnast
