= Viktor Thorn =

Viktor Thorn may refer to:

- Viktor Thorn (Nordic combined skier) (fl. 1895), Norwegian Nordic combined skier
- Viktor Thorn (cross-country skier) (born 1996), Swedish cross-country skier

== See also ==
- Victor Thorn (1844–1930), Luxembourg politician
- Victor Thorn (died 2016), American anti-government conspiracy theorist
