= Frank Ashley =

Frank Ashley may refer to:

- Frank Ashley Day Middle School
- Frank Ashley (skier) in Colorado Ski and Snowboard Hall of Fame

== See also ==
- Francis Ashley (1569–1635), English lawyer and politician
