= Braaten =

Braaten is a Norwegian surname. Notable people with the surname include:

- Daniel Braaten (born 1982), Norwegian footballer
- Oskar Braaten, (1881–1939) Norwegian novelist
- Carl Braaten (1929–2023), American theologist
- Kenneth Braaten (born 1974), Norwegian skier
- Vegard Braaten (born 1987), Norwegian footballer
- Josh Braaten (born 1977), American actor
- Paul Braaten, (1876–1963) Norwegian skier
