= Emil Kvanlid =

Norwegian Nordic combined skier

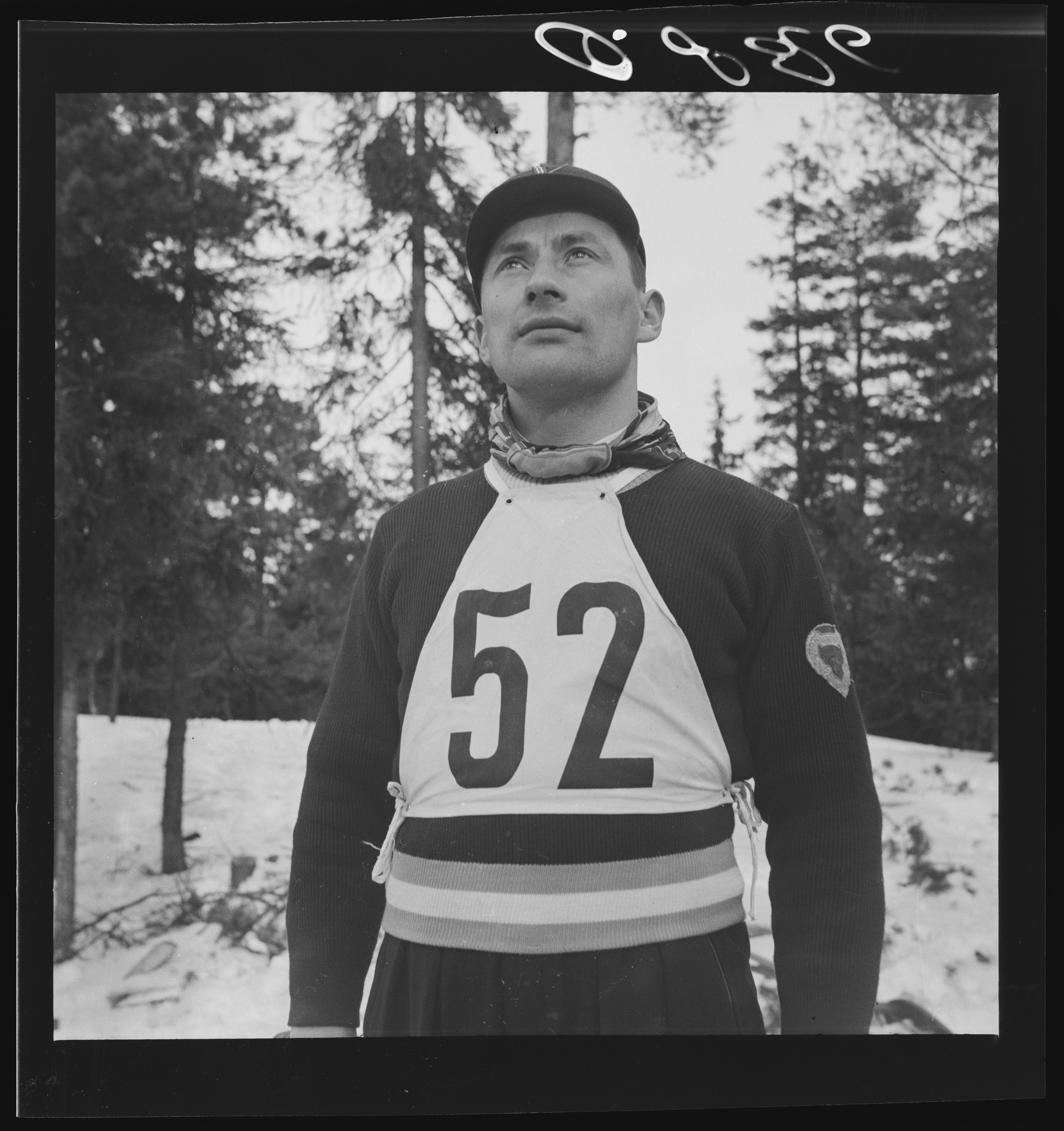
Emil Kvanlid,1940

Emil Kvanlid (4 July 1911, Målselv Municipality – 1 June 1998) was a Norwegian Nordic combined skier who won the Nordic combined event at the Holmenkollen ski festival in both 1938 and 1940. Kvanlid belatedly earned the Holmenkollen medal in 1993.
