= Robert Pehrson =

Norwegian Nordic skier

Robert Didrik Pehrson (27 June 1872 – 6 May 1965) was a Norwegian Nordic skier who won Norwegian skiing's highest honour, the Holmenkollen Medal, in 1899 (shared with Paul Braaten).
