= Johan Kristoffersen =

Norwegian Nordic combined skier

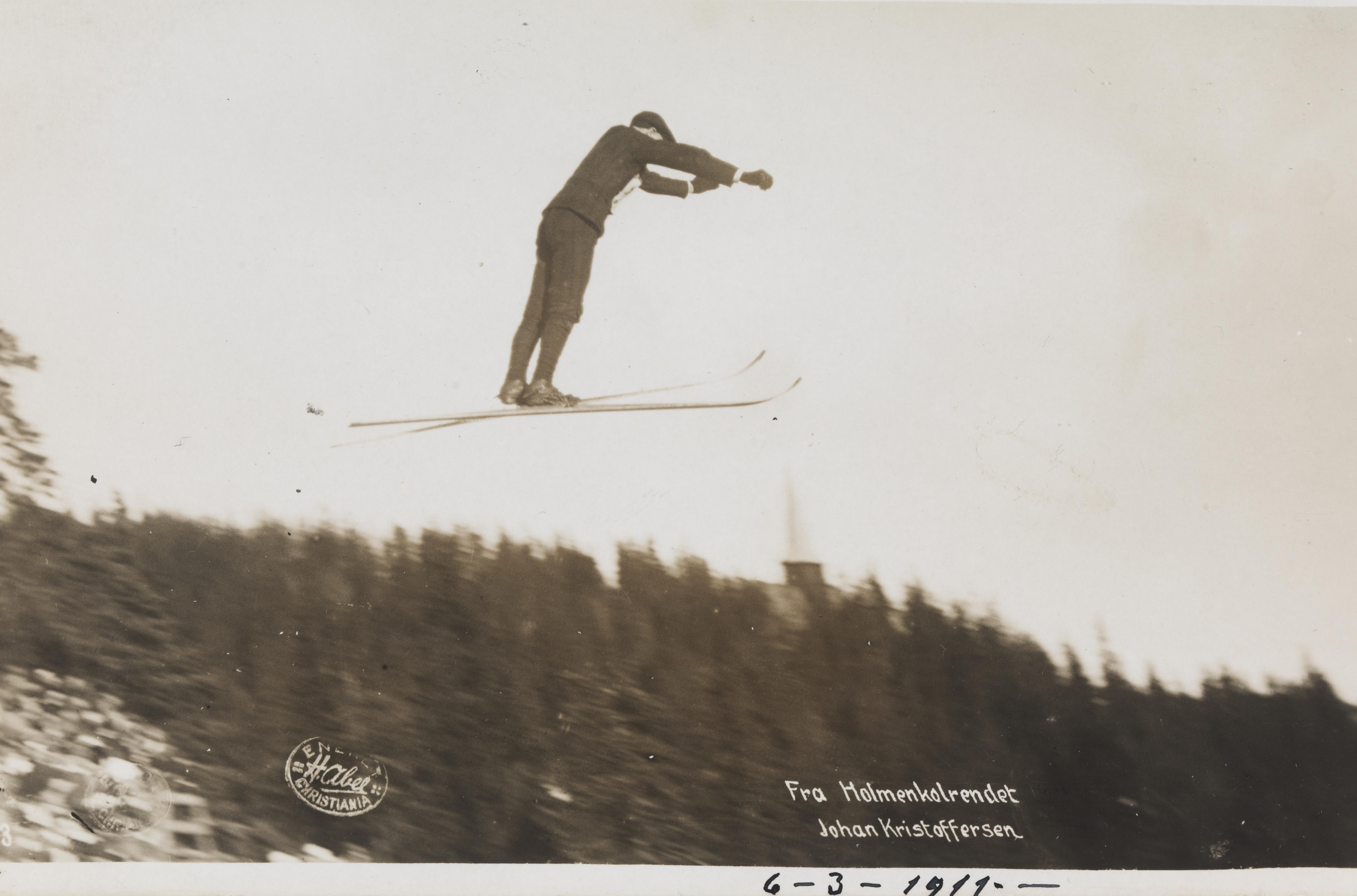
Picture taken from the National Library's picture collection Holmenkollbakken, Oslo

Johan Kristoffersen (9 July 1889 – 22 January 1953) was a Norwegian Nordic combined skier who won the event at the 1911 Holmenkollen ski festival. He earned the Holmenkollen Medal in 1914.
