= Thorvald Hansen (skier) =

Norwegian skier

Thorvald Hansen was a Norwegian Nordic combined skier who won the event at the Holmenkollen ski festival in 1905 and 1909. For being the first two-time Nordic combined winner, Hansen earned the Holmenkollen medal in 1909.
