= Elling Rønes =

Norwegian cross-country skier

Elling Rønes (28 July 1882 – 12 September 1965) is a Norwegian cross-country skier who won the men's 50 km event in 1906 (40 km), 1907, 1908, and 1916 at the Holmenkollen ski festival. Born in Trysil Municipality, he was the first person to win the 50 km event at the Holmenkollen three times. Rønes would be belatedly awarded the Holmenkollen medal in 1947.
