= Eero Kolehmainen =

Finnish cross-country skier

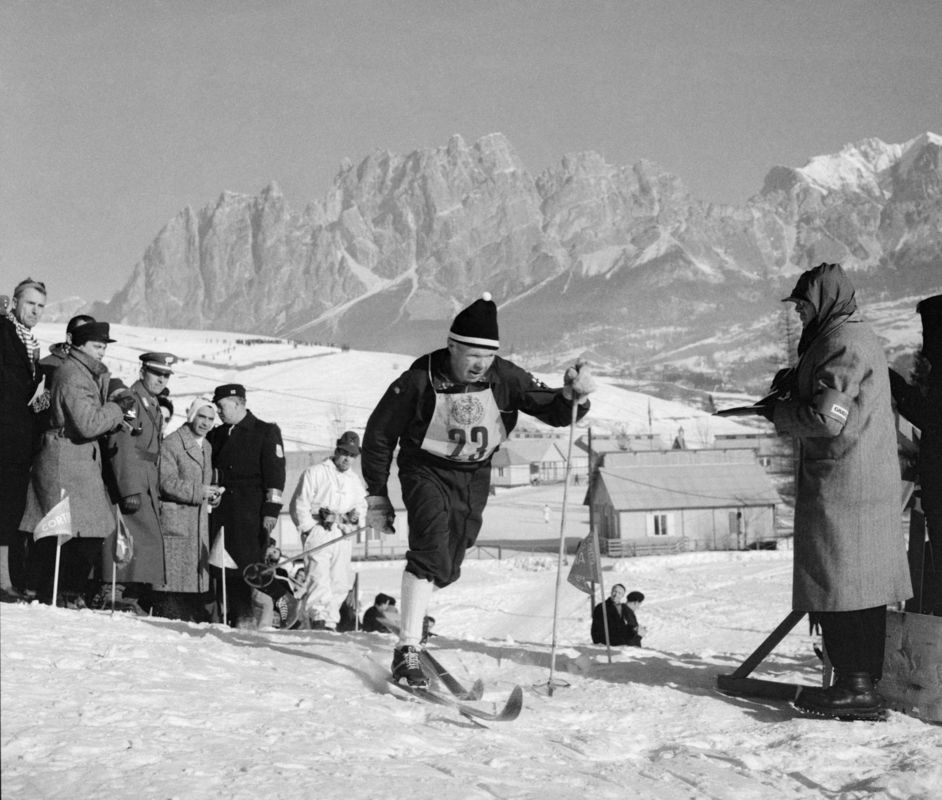
- Kolehmainen at the 1956 Olympics

Personal information
- Born: 24 March 1918 Anttola, Finland
- Died: 7 December 2013 (aged 95) Mikkeli, Finland
- Height: 171 cm (5 ft 7 in)
- Weight: 64 kg (141 lb)

Sport
- Sport: Cross-country skiing
- Club: Anttolan Urheilijat
Medal record
Men's cross-country skiing
Representing Finland
Olympic Games
| Silver medal – second place | 1952 Oslo | 50 km |

Eero Johannes Kolehmainen (24 March 1918 – 7 December 2013) was a Finnish cross-country skier. He competed in the 50 km event at the 1952 and 1956 Olympics and won a silver medal in 1952, placing fourth in 1956. In 1957, aged 39, he won the 50 km races at the Holmenkollen ski festival and Lahti Ski Games. The same year, he was awarded the Holmenkollen medal. Kolehmainen's best finish at the FIS Nordic World Ski Championships was fifth over 50 km in 1958. He was a farmer by occupation.

== Cross-country skiing results ==
All results are sourced from the International Ski Federation (FIS).

=== Olympic Games ===
- 1 medal – (1 silver)

| Year | Age | 15 km | 18 km | 30 km | 50 km | 4 × 10 km relay |
|---|---|---|---|---|---|---|
| 1952 | 33 | —N/a | — | —N/a | Silver | — |
| 1956 | 37 | — | —N/a | — | 4 | — |

=== World Championships ===
| Year | Age | 15 km | 30 km | 50 km | 4 × 10 km relay |
|---|---|---|---|---|---|
| 1958 | 39 | — | — | 5 | — |
