= Knut Holst =

Norwegian Nordic skier

Knut Andreassen Holst (3 December 1884 – 4 February 1977) is a Norwegian Nordic skier who shared the Holmenkollen medal in 1911 with Otto Tangen.
