= Oscar Gjøslien =

Norwegian cross-country skier (1909–1995)

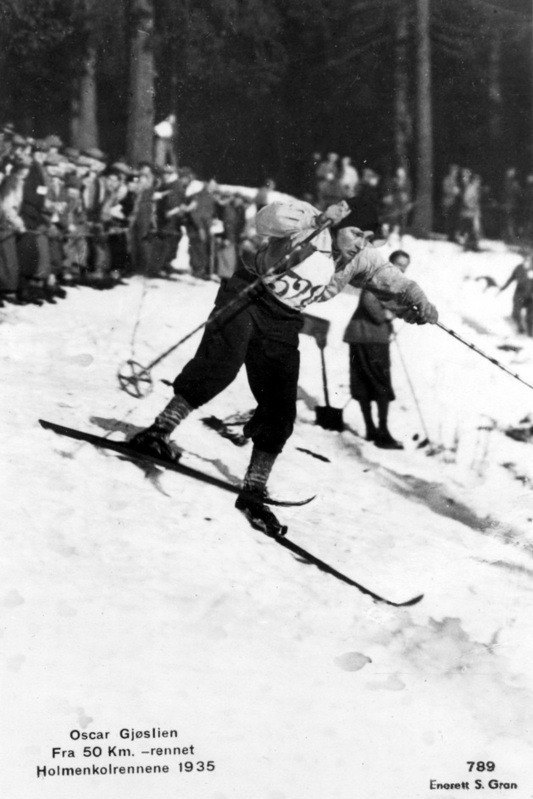
- Oscar Gjøslien at Holmenkollen in 1935

Medal record

Men's cross-country skiing

Representing Norway

World Championships
Bronze medal – third place	1939 Zakopane	50 km

Oscar Gjøslien (also spelled Gjoeslien, November 9, 1909 – May 20, 1995) was a Norwegian cross-country skier who competed during the 1930s.

He won a bronze medal at the 1939 FIS Nordic World Ski Championships in the 50 km. In 1935, Gjøslien won the 50 km cross-country skiing event at the Holmenkollen ski festival. Because of his successes, Gjøslien was awarded the Holmenkollen medal in 1940 (shared with Annar Ryen).

== Cross-country skiing results ==
All results are sourced from the International Ski Federation (FIS).

=== World Championships ===
- 1 medal – (1 bronze)

Year	Age	18 km	50 km	4 × 10 km relay
1934	24	—	16	—
1938	28	26	35	—
1939	29	35	Bronze	—
