= Lars Bergendahl =

Norwegian cross-country skier (1909–1997)

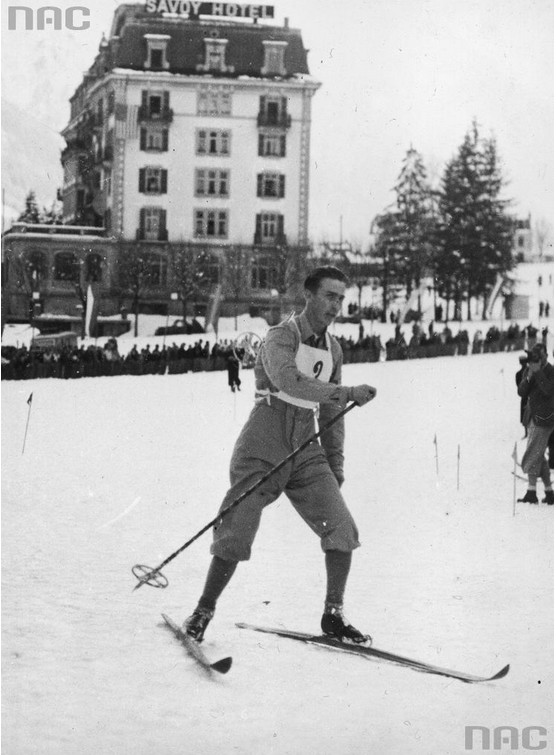

Medal record

Men's cross-country skiing

Representing Norway

World Championships
Gold medal – first place	1937 Chamonix	18 km
Gold medal – first place	1937 Chamonix	4 × 10 km relay
Gold medal – first place	1939 Zakopane	50 km
Silver medal – second place	1938 Lahti	4 × 10 km relay
Bronze medal – third place	1938 Lahti	50 km

Lars Bergendahl (30 January 1909 – 22 June 1997) was a Norwegian cross-country skier who competed during the 1930s.

He won several medals at the FIS Nordic World Ski Championships. In 1937, Bergendahl earned golds in the 18 km cross country event and 4 × 10 km relay. In 1938, he earned a silver in the 4 × 10 km relay and a bronze in the 50 km Cross country event. In 1939, Bergendahl won the 50 km cross-country skiing event. Bergendahl won the men's 50 km at the Holmenkollen ski festival in 1940. Because of his successes, Bergendahl was awarded the Holmenkollen medal in 1939 (Shared with Sven Selånger and Trygve Brodahl.). His uncle, Lauritz, won the medal in 1910.

Bergendahl fought in the Norwegian Campaign following the German invasion of Norway in 1940. Together with other sportsmen Bergendahl served in the improvised ski unit Sørkedalen Company (Norwegian: Sørkedalen kompani) in April 1940.

== Cross-country skiing results ==
All results are sourced from the International Ski Federation (FIS).

=== World Championships ===
- 5 medals – (3 gold, 1 silver, 1 bronze)

Year	Age	17 km	18 km	50 km	4 × 10 km relay
1930	21	—	—N/a	38	—N/a
1934	25	—N/a	13	15	4
1937	28	—N/a	Gold	5	Gold
1938	29	—N/a	23	Bronze	Silver
1939	30	—N/a	5	Gold	—
