= Per Bakken =

Norwegian Nordic combined skier

Per Bakken (26 October 1882 – August 1958) was a Norwegian Nordic skier who won both the Nordic combined and 50 km cross-country skiing events at the Holmenkollen ski festival in 1904. For his dual victories that year, Bakken earned the Holmenkollen medal in 1907.
