= Gunder Gundersen =

Norwegian Nordic combined skier

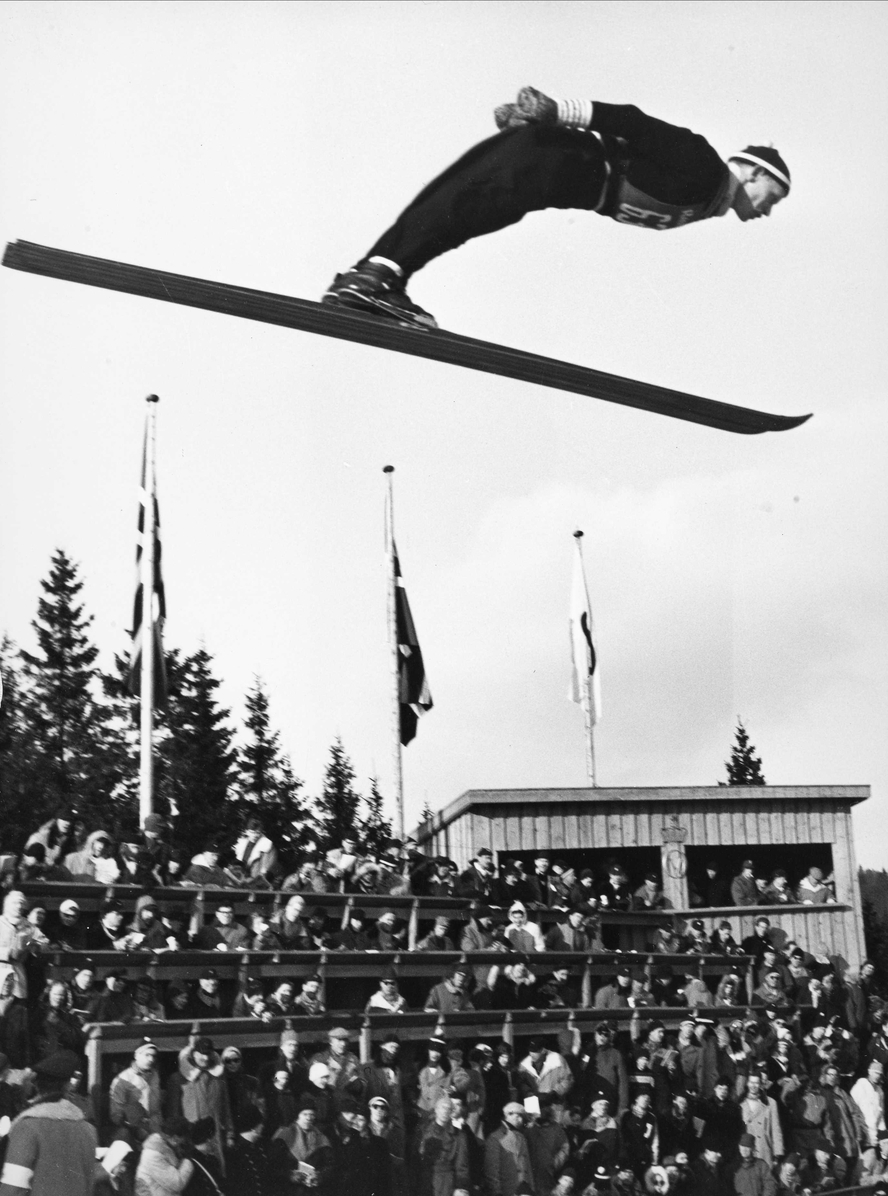

Personal information
- Born: 12 September 1930 Asker, Norway
- Died: 2 June 2005 (aged 74)
Medal record
Men's Nordic combined
World Championships
Silver medal – second place	1954 Falun	Individual
Bronze medal – third place	1958 Lahti	Individual

Gunder Gundersen (12 September 1930 – 2 June 2005) was a Norwegian Nordic combined skier and sports official. He was born in Asker.

== Competitive career ==
During his active career he won two individual FIS Nordic World Ski Championships medals (1954: silver, 1958: bronze) and the Holmenkollen ski festival three times (1952, 1959 (shared with Sverre Stenersen, and 1960). He finished eleventh in the Nordic combined event at the 1960 Winter Olympics in Squaw Valley.

Gundersen received the Holmenkollen medal in 1959 and represented the club IF Frisk Asker.

== Post-retirement career ==
Gundersen was the Technical Director of the Nordic combined individual event at the 1980 Winter Olympics in Lake Placid, New York.

His most significant impact on Nordic combined was creating the "Gundersen method", in use since 1985. This method recalculated the ski jumping points into cross-country skiing start times with the athletes then starting at staggered times with the winning ski jumper starting first. For the 15 km individual and the 7.5 km sprint, the difference between the competitors at the start of the cross country portion of the event was one ski jumping point equaling four seconds. For the 4 × 5 km team event, one ski jumping point equaled 3 seconds, but this was changed in 1995 to one point equaling 1.5 seconds, then in 2005 to one point equaling one second, and then again in 2009 to one point equaling 1.33 seconds.
