= Lars Høgvold =

Norwegian ski jumper

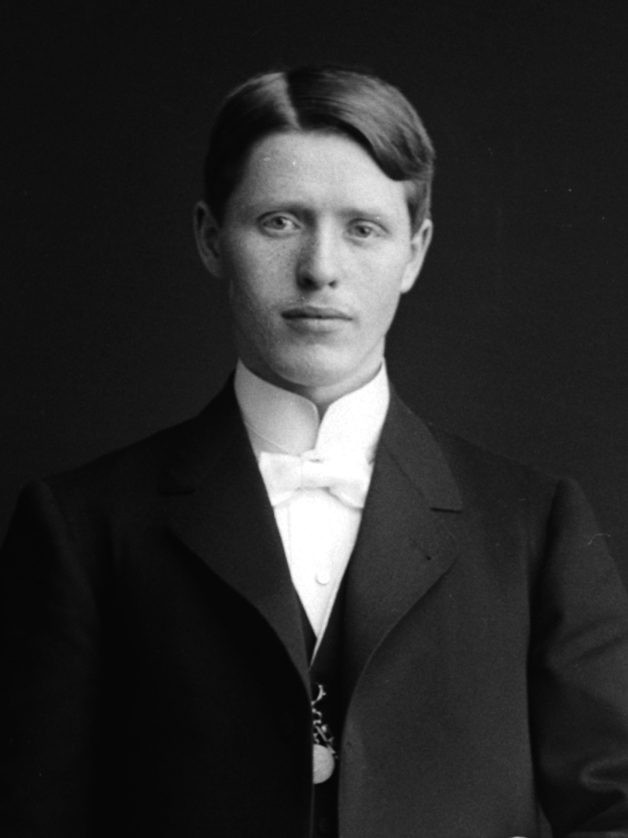

Lars Høgvold (11 September 1888 – 31 December 1963) was a Norwegian ski jumper. He was awarded the Holmenkollen medal in 1916 and finished 6th at the FIS Nordic World Ski Championships 1926. He was born in Løten and competed for Løiten SF, Furnes SF and Lillehammer SK. He was a board member for 25 years in Lillehammer SK, 4 years in Gudbrandsdal District of Skiing and 10 years in the Norwegian Ski Federation.
