= Otto Tangen =

Norwegian Nordic skier

Otto Tangen (28 January 1886 – 13 October 1956) was a Norwegian Nordic skier who shared the Holmenkollen medal in 1911 with Knut Holst.
