= Otto Aasen =

Norwegian Nordic skier (1894–1983)

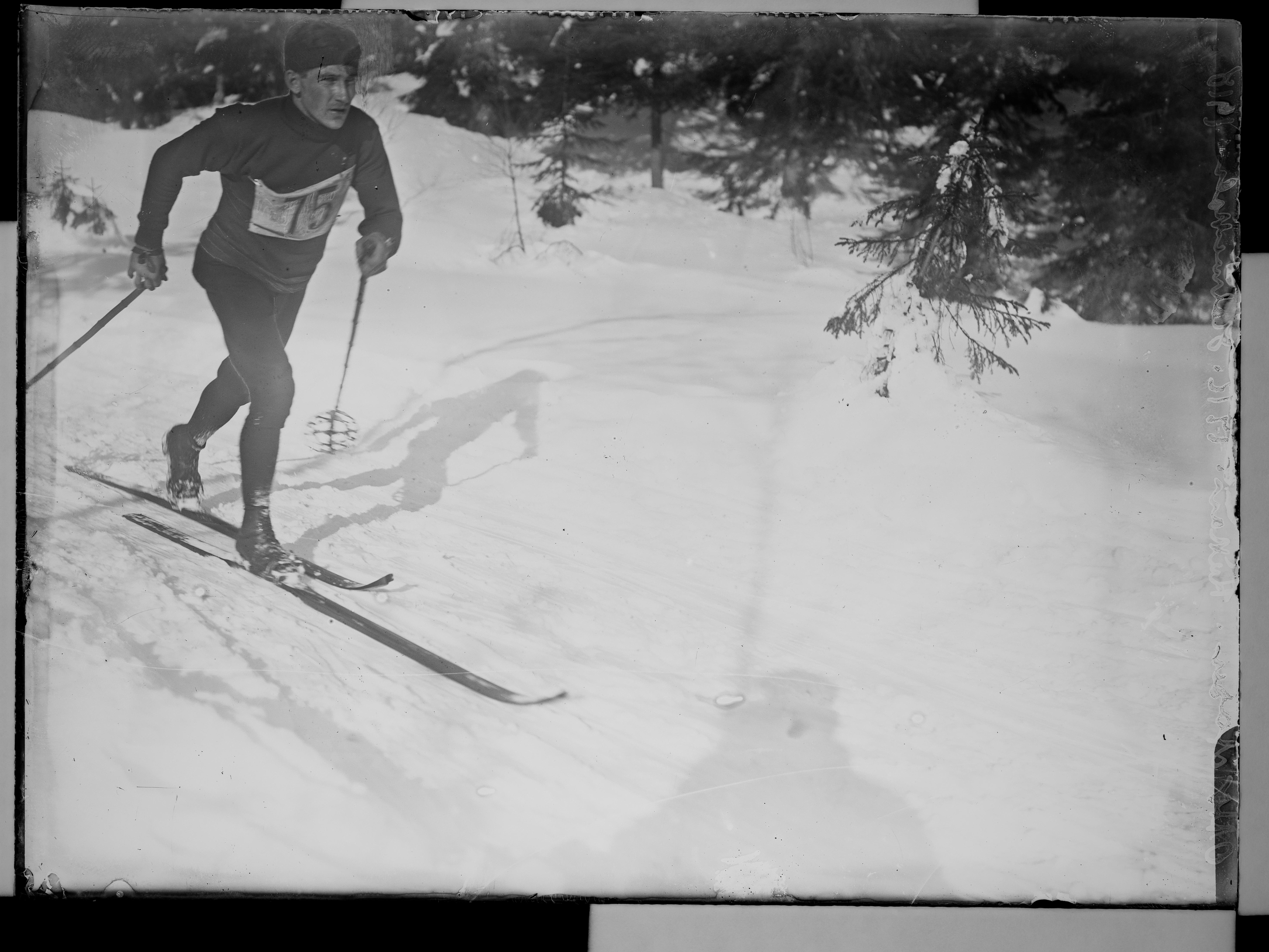

Personal information
- Born: 1 January 1894 Fåberg, Norway
- Died: 20 October 1983 (aged 89) Rjukan, Norway
Medal record
Men's ski jumping
Representing Norway
World Championships
Silver medal – second place	1926 Lahti	Individual large hill

Otto Aasen (1 January 1894 – 20 October 1983) was a Norwegian Nordic skier.

He was born in Fåberg, but moved to Rjukan in 1916. He spent his working career at Norsk Hydro in Rjukan from 1916 to 1964.

He won the Nordic combined at the Holmenkollen ski festival in 1917 and 1918. For his Nordic combined victories, Aasen shared the Holmenkollen medal in 1919 with Thorleif Haug. Aasen also competed in ski jumping, and won a silver medal in the individual large hill at the 1926 FIS Nordic World Ski Championships in Lahti. He also competed in cross-country skiing on a national level.
