= Trygve Brodahl =

Norwegian cross-country skier (1905–1996)

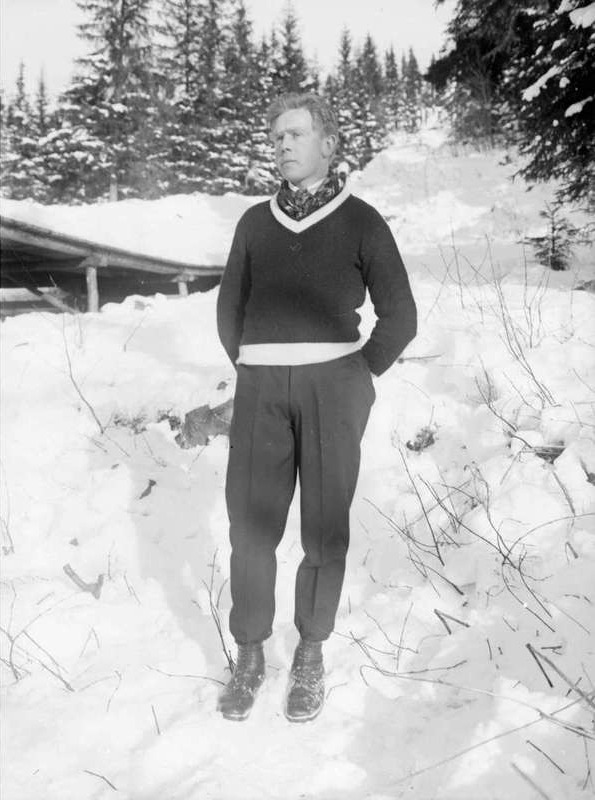

Medal record

Men's cross-country skiing

Representing Norway

World Championships
Silver medal – second place	1930 Oslo	17 km
Silver medal – second place	1935 Vysoké Tatry	4 × 10 km relay
Bronze medal – third place	1935 Vysoké Tatry	50 km

Trygve Brodahl (20 August 1905 in Hønefoss – 11 April 1996) was a Norwegian cross-country skier who competed during the 1930s.

He won a silver medal at the 1930 FIS Nordic World Ski Championships in 17 km and a silver in the 4 × 10 km relay as well as a bronze at 50 km in 1935. In 1939, Brodahl won the 18 km cross-country skiing event at the Holmenkollen ski festival. Because of his successes, Brodahl was awarded the Holmenkollen medal in 1939 (shared with Sven Selånger and Lars Bergendahl).

He also competed in the men's 50 kilometre event at the 1936 Winter Olympics.

== Cross-country skiing results ==
All results are sourced from the International Ski Federation (FIS).

=== Olympic Games ===
Year	Age	18 km	50 km	4 × 10 km relay
1936	30	—	11	—

=== World Championships ===
- 3 medals – (2 silver, 1 bronze)

Year	Age	17 km	18 km	50 km	4 × 10 km relay
1930	24	Silver	—N/a	18	—N/a
1934	28	—N/a	17	21	—
1935	29	—N/a	11	Bronze	Silver
1938	32	—N/a	88	—	—
