= Rauno Miettinen =

Finnish Nordic combined skier

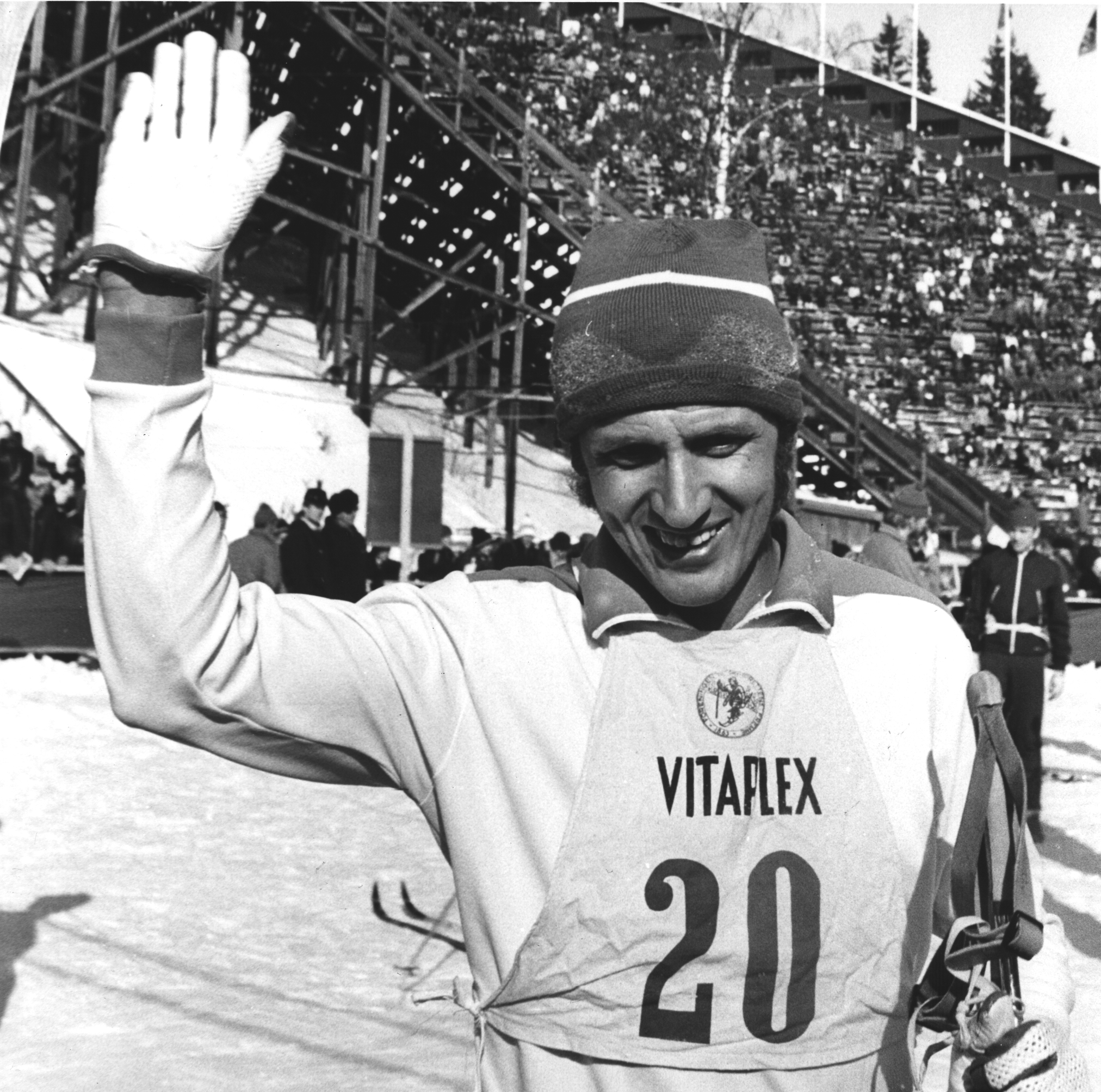

Medal record

Men's Nordic combined

Representing Finland

Olympic Games
Silver medal – second place	1972 Sapporo	Individual

World Championships
Silver medal – second place	1978 Lahti	Individual
Silver medal – second place	1982 Oslo	3 x 10 km team
Silver medal – second place	1984 Rovaniemi	3 x 10 km team

Rauno Miettinen (born 25 May 1949 in Kuopio) is a Finnish former Nordic combined skier. He earned a silver in the individual event at the 1972 Winter Olympics in Sapporo.

Miettinen also won three Nordic combined silver medals in the FIS Nordic World Ski Championships (Individual: 1978, 3 x 10 km team: 1982 (tied with Norway), 1984).

His biggest success as a Nordic combined athlete was at the Holmenkollen ski festival, where he won the event five times (1969, 1971–1973, 1978). Miettinen is one of only four people to win the Holmenkollen Nordic combined five times (the others being Lauritz Bergendahl, Johan Grøttumsbråten, and Bjarte Engen Vik).

Miettinen was awarded the Holmenkollen medal in 1972 (shared with Magne Myrmo).
