= Lauritz Bergendahl =

Norwegian Nordic skier (1887–1964)

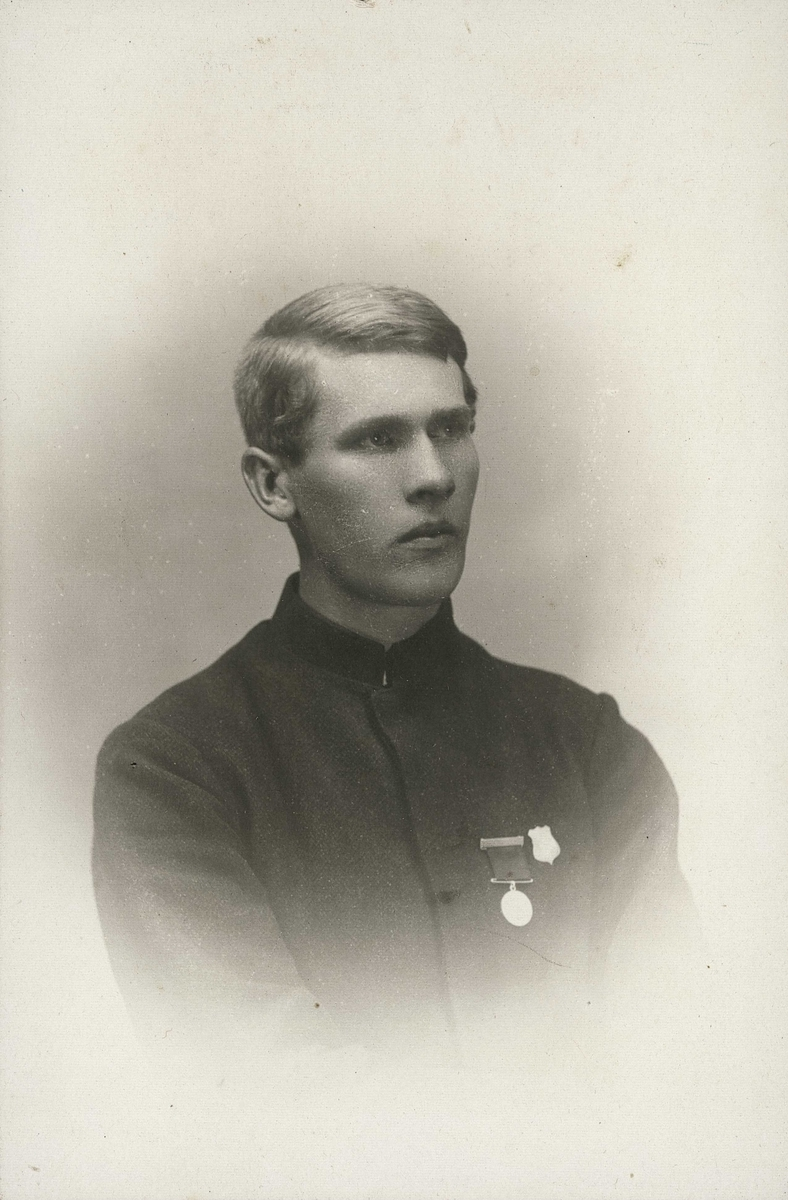
Lauritz Bergendahl

Lauritz Bergendahl (30 January 1887 – 15 April 1964) was a Norwegian Nordic skier who won both the Nordic combined and the 50 km cross-country skiing events at the Holmenkollen ski festival in 1910, 1912, 1913, 1914, and 1915. Bergendahl's Holmenkollen 50 km cross-country skiing victories have only been exceeded by one skier (Thorleif Haug) while his Holmenkollen Nordic combined victories have been matched by three others (Johan Grøttumsbråten, Rauno Miettinen, and Bjarte Engen Vik). Bergendahl earned the Holmenkollen medal in 1910 while his nephew Lars earned the honor in 1939.

Lauritz Bergendahl was the first skiing star, Nordic or alpine, anywhere. He was called simply the "ski king". Between 1910 and 1915, he won the 50 km race at Holmenkollen five times. Born in 1888, he was nearly lost to skiing through religious revivalism, but his other vocation was too strong. His stardom arose from the lack of national heroes in the aftermath of independence and the poor calibre of politicians. Bergendahl was probably the first sporting figure, anywhere, faut de mieux, to do duty as national icon. He was the first skier to train methodically. He systematically developed both speed and stamina. He was a pioneer of tempo training. In particular, he was interested in coordination of sticks and skis. He was a pioneer in adapting the Finnish double heave on the sticks as part of an innovative tactical adjustment of technique to terrain. He was the founder of modern Nordic skiing, and the analytical system of coaching. By trade he was a forester, like most of the early Nordic skiers, mainly because of the strength and suppleness developed in wielding axe and saw.

The first free heel toe binding to go into production was the Selmer's "Bergendahl" binding. Norway 1913

In an obituary of Bergendahl in Aftenposten on 17 April 1965, the signature "Am" wrote, among other things:

No one has shaped the Holmenkoll race like Lauritz Bergendahl, no one! In 1915 he won everything there was to win: 50 km, 15 km, the King's Cup for combined races and the Ladies' Cup for the best mare. He set other records, including winning the 5-mile five years in a row. He won five King's Cups in Holmenkollen. In all, he won ten king's cups, but he did not become Olympic or world champion, because there were no such races at the time.

At Sørkedalen school, King Olav unveiled a memorial to Bergendahl in 1977, made by Nic. Schiøll.

In Stavanger there is Lauritz Bergendahls gate, in an area where several of the streets are named after sports figures.

Lauritz Bergendahl is buried at Grefsen cemetery in Oslo.

Oslo, Norway, February 13, 1952: Norwegian skiing champion Lauritz Bergendal carries the Olympic torch on the final stage of the relay, just before the lighting of the flame to begin the sixth Olympiad.
