= Per Samuelshaug =

Norwegian cross-country skier

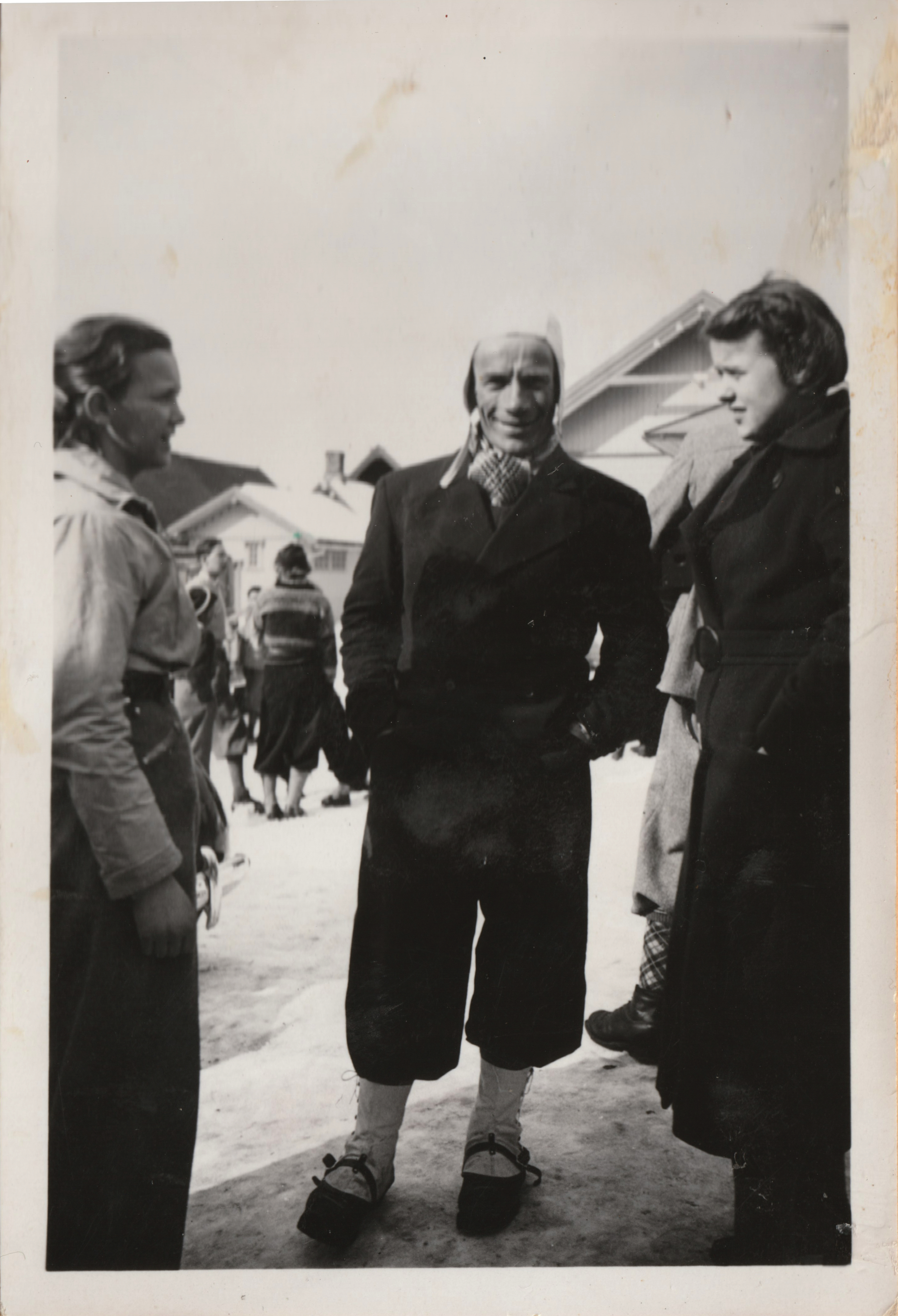
- Per Samuelshaug, circa 1938

Personal information
- Nationality: Norwegian
- Born: 26 August 1905 Alvdal Municipality, Norway
- Died: 4 January 1990 (aged 84) Alvdal Municipality, Norway

Sport
- Sport: Cross-country skiing
- Club: Alvdal IL

Per Samuelshaug (26 August 1905 – 4 January 1990) was a Norwegian cross-country skier from Alvdal Municipality who participated at the 1936 Winter Olympics. He won the 50 km race at the Holmenkollen ski festival in 1937.

He represented the club Alvdal IL.

== Cross-country skiing results ==
=== Olympic Games ===
Year	Age	18 km	50 km	4 × 10 km relay
1936	30	—	DNF	—

=== World Championships ===
Year	Age	18 km	50 km	4 × 10 km relay
1934	28	34	22	—
