= Holmenkollen Medal =

Norwegian skiing award

- Holmenkollenmedaljen
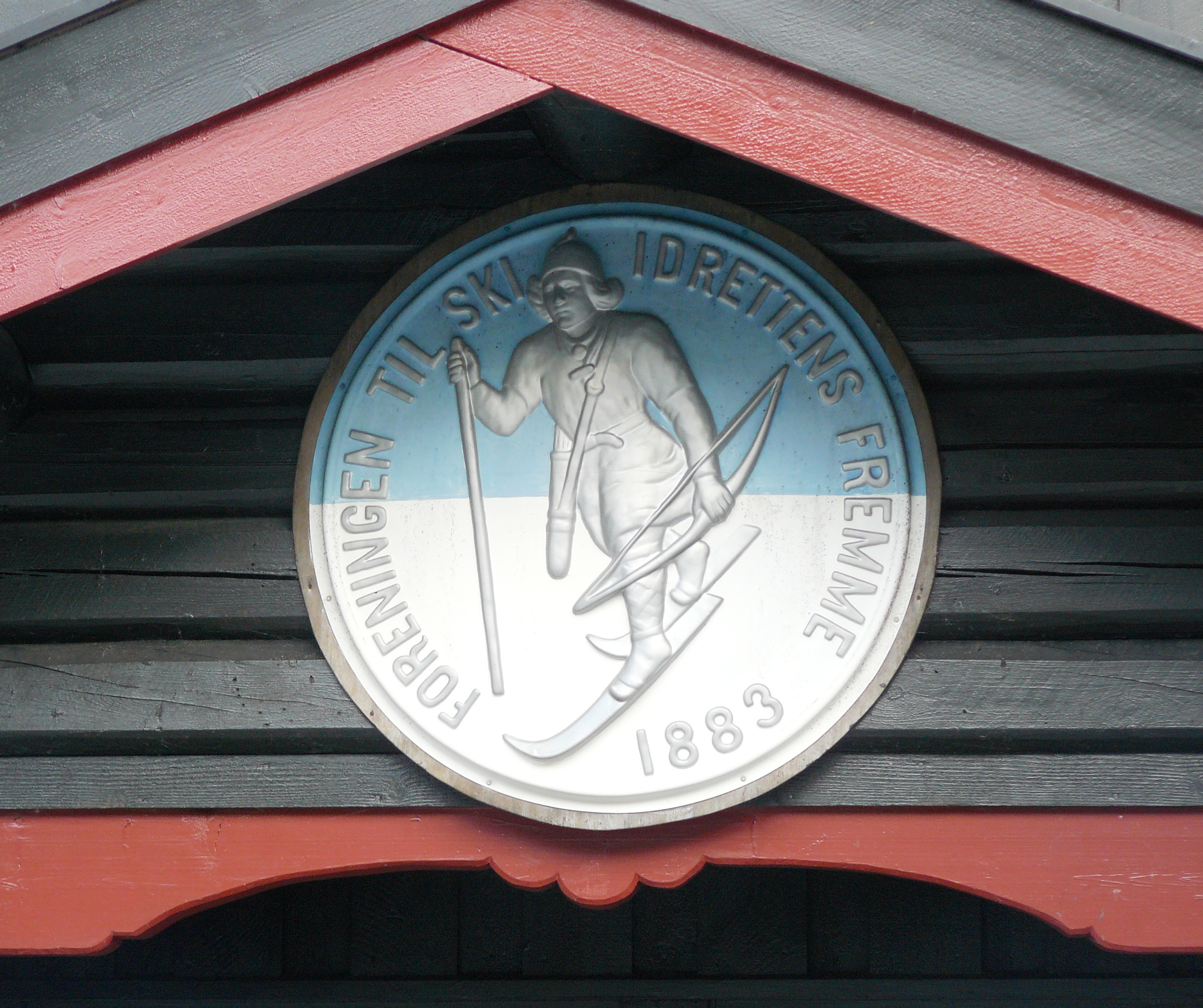
- Skiforeningen seal
- Awarded for: Achievements in, or the advancement of, skiing
- Venue: Holmenkollen National Arena
- Country: Norway
- Presented by: Skiforeningen
- Eligibility: Skiing athletes and contributors
- First award: 1895
- Website: skiforeningen.no
- Ribbon of the medal

The Holmenkollen Medal (Norwegian: Holmenkollenmedaljen) is an annual honorary skiing award that has been issued by the Skiforeningen in Norway since 1895. It recognizes the outstanding achievements of skiing athletes who place at the top of international championships and at Holmenkollen Ski Festival events, as well as those who contribute to advancement of the sport of skiing. The Holmenkollen Medal is considered Norwegian skiing's highest honor.

== History ==
The Holmenkollen Medal was established by the Skiforeningen, also known as the Association for the Promotion of Skiing, in 1894. Andreas Bloch, a Norwegian artist, designed the medal. It contains the ski association's emblem and the phrase, "Idræt for fædrelandet", which means sports for the fatherland. The medal was first awarded in 1895.

The board of the Skiforeningen selects the award winners. In its early years, the award was given for placement at events held during the Holmenkollen Ski Festival. In the latter part of the 20th century, the board considered results at major international ski events and at Holmonkollen. The medal is mostly awarded to active skiers in the Nordic skiing disciplines, though Alpine skiers have received the distinction. A skiing museum curator and members of the Norwegian royal family have also been among past medal recipients. Since 2011, Biathletes have received the award.

The medal is awarded during the Holmenkollen Ski Festival and may be presented to the recipient by a Norwegian monarch. There are some years in which the medal is not awarded.

== List of medalists ==
Award winners are from the Skiforeningen.

Year	Medalist	Country	Sport or Category
1895	Viktor Thorn	Norway	Nordic combined
1897	Asbjørn Nilssen	Norway	Nordic combined
1899	Paul Braaten	Norway	Nordic combined
1899	Robert Pehrson	Norway	Nordic combined
1901	Aksel Refstad	Norway	Nordic combined
1903	Karl Hovelsen	Norway	Nordic combined
1904	Harald Smith	Norway	Nordic combined
1905	Jonas Holmen	Norway	Nordic combined
1907	Per Bakken	Norway	Nordic combined
1908	Einar Kristiansen	Norway	Nordic combined
1909	Thorvald Hansen	Norway	Nordic combined
1910	Lauritz Bergendahl	Norway	Nordic combined
1911	Otto Tangen	Norway	Nordic combined
1911	Knut Holst	Norway	Nordic combined
1912	Olav Bjaaland	Norway	Nordic combined
1914	Johan Kristoffersen	Norway	Nordic combined
1915	Sverre Østbye	Norway	Nordic combined
1916	Lars Høgvold	Norway	Nordic combined
1918	Hans Horn	Norway	Nordic combined
1918	Jørgen Hansen	Norway	Nordic combined
1919	Thorleif Haug	Norway	Nordic combined
1919	Otto Aasen	Norway	Nordic combined
1923	Thoralf Strømstad	Norway	Nordic combined
1924	Harald Økern	Norway	Nordic combined
1924	Johan Grøttumsbråten	Norway	Nordic combined
1925	Einar Landvik	Norway	Nordic combined
1926	Jacob Tullin Thams	Norway	Ski jumping
1927	Hagbart Haakonsen	Norway	Cross-country skiing
1927	Einar Lindboe	Norway	Nordic combined
1928	Torjus Hemmestveit	Norway	Nordic combined
1928	Mikkjel Hemmestveit	Norway	Nordic combined
1931	Hans Vinjarengen	Norway	Nordic combined
1931	Ole Stenen	Norway	Nordic combined
1934	Oddbjørn Hagen	Norway	Nordic combined
1935	Arne Rustadstuen	Norway	Nordic combined
1937	Olaf Hoffsbakken	Norway	Nordic combined
1937	Birger Ruud	Norway	Ski jumping
1937	Martin P. Vangsli	Norway	Cross-country skiing
1938	Reidar Andersen	Norway	Ski jumping
1938	Johan R. Henriksen	Norway	Cross-country skiing
1939	Sven Selånger	Sweden	Ski jumping
1939	Lars Bergendahl	Norway	Cross-country skiing
1939	Trygve Brodahl	Norway	Cross-country skiing
1940	Oscar Gjøslien	Norway	Nordic combined
1940	Annar Ryen	Norway	Cross-country skiing
1947	Elling Rønes	Norway	Nordic combined
1948	Asbjørn Ruud	Norway	Ski jumping
1949	Sigmund Ruud	Norway	Ski jumping
1950	Olav Økern	Norway	Cross-country skiing
1951	Simon Slåttvik	Norway	Nordic combined
1952	Stein Eriksen	Norway	Alpine skiing
1952	Torbjørn Falkanger	Norway	Ski jumping
1952	Heikki Hasu	Finland	Cross-country skiing
1952	Nils Karlsson	Sweden	Cross-country skiing
1953	Magnar Estenstad	Norway	Nordic combined
1954	Martin Stokken	Norway	Nordic combined
1955	Haakon VII	Norway	Royalty
1955	Hallgeir Brenden	Norway	Cross-country skiing
1955	Veikko Hakulinen	Finland	Cross-country skiing
1955	Sverre Stenersen	Norway	Nordic combined
1956	Borghild Niskin	Norway	Alpine skiing
1956	Arnfinn Bergmann	Norway	Ski jumping
1956	Arne Hoel	Norway	Ski jumping
1957	Eero Kolehmainen	Finland	Cross-country skiing
1958	Inger Bjørnbakken	Norway	Alpine skiing
1958	Håkon Brusveen	Norway	Cross-country skiing
1959	Gunder Gundersen	Norway	Nordic combined
1960	Helmut Recknagel	East Germany	Ski jumping
1960	Sixten Jernberg	Sweden	Cross-country skiing
1960	Sverre Stensheim	Norway	Cross-country skiing
1960	Tormod Knutsen	Norway	Nordic combined
1961	Harald Grønningen	Norway	Cross-country skiing
1962	Toralf Engan	Norway	Ski jumping
1963	Alevtina Kolchina	Soviet Union	Cross-country skiing
1963	Pavel Kolchin	Soviet Union	Cross-country skiing
1963	Astrid Sandvik	Norway	Alpine skiing
1963	Torbjørn Yggeseth	Norway	Ski jumping
1964	Veikko Kankkonen	Finland	Ski jumping
1964	Eero Mäntyranta	Finland	Cross-country skiing
1964	Georg Thoma	West Germany	Nordic combined
1964	Halvor Næs	Norway	Cross-country skiing
1965	Arto Tiainen	Finland	Cross-country skiing
1965	Bengt Eriksson	Sweden	Nordic combined
1965	Arne Larsen	Norway	Nordic combined
1967	Ole Ellefsæter	Norway	Cross-country skiing
1967	Toini Gustafsson	Sweden	Cross-country skiing
1968	Olav V	Norway	Royalty
1968	Assar Rönnlund	Sweden	Cross-country skiing
1968	Gjermund Eggen	Norway	Cross-country skiing
1968	Bjørn Wirkola	Norway	Ski jumping
1969	Odd Martinsen	Norway	Cross-country skiing
1970	Pål Tyldum	Norway	Cross-country skiing
1971	Marjatta Kajosmaa	Finland	Cross-country skiing
1971	Berit Mørdre Lammedal	Norway	Cross-country skiing
1971	Reidar Hjermstad	Norway	Cross-country skiing
1972	Rauno Miettinen	Finland	Nordic combined
1972	Magne Myrmo	Norway	Cross-country skiing
1973	Einar Bergsland	Norway	Nordic combined
1973	Ingolf Mork	Norway	Ski jumping
1973	Franz Keller	West Germany	Cross-country skiing
1974	Juha Mieto	Finland	Cross-country skiing
1975	Gerhard Grimmer	East Germany	Cross-country skiing
1975	Oddvar Brå	Norway	Cross-country skiing
1975	Ivar Formo	Norway	Nordic combined
1976	Ulrich Wehling	East Germany	Nordic combined
1977	Helena Takalo	Finland	Cross-country skiing
1977	Hilkka Kuntola	Finland	Nordic combined
1977	Walter Steiner	Switzerland	Ski jumping
1979	Ingemar Stenmark	Sweden	Alpine skiing
1979	Erik Håker	Norway	Alpine skiing
1979	Raisa Smetanina	Soviet Union	Cross-country skiing
1980	Thomas Wassberg	Sweden	Cross-country skiing
1981	Johan Sætre	Norway	Ski jumping
1983	Berit Aunli	Norway	Cross-country skiing
1983	Tom Sandberg	Norway	Nordic combined
1984	Lars-Erik Eriksen	Norway	Cross-country skiing
1984	Jacob Vaage	Norway	Curator
1984	Armin Kogler	Austria	Ski jumping
1985	Anette Bøe	Norway	Cross-country skiing
1985	Per Bergerud	Norway	Ski jumping
1985	Gunde Svan	Sweden	Cross-country skiing
1986	Britt Pettersen	Norway	Cross-country skiing
1987	Matti Nykänen	Finland	Ski jumping
1987	Hermann Weinbuch	West Germany	Nordic combined
1989	Marja-Liisa Kirvesniemi	Finland	Cross-country skiing
1991	Vegard Ulvang	Norway	Cross-country skiing
1991	Trond Einar Elden	Norway	Nordic combined
1991	Ernst Vettori	Austria	Ski jumping
1991	Jens Weißflog	Germany	Ski jumping
1992	Yelena Välbe	Russia	Cross-country skiing
1993	Emil Kvanlid	Norway	Nordic combined
1994	Lyubov Yegorova	Russia	Cross-country skiing
1994	Vladimir Smirnov	Kazakhstan	Cross-country skiing
1994	Espen Bredesen	Norway	Ski jumping
1995	Kenji Ogiwara	Japan	Nordic combined
1996	Manuela Di Centa	Italy	Cross-country skiing
1997	Bjarte Engen Vik	Norway	Nordic combined
1997	Stefania Belmondo	Italy	Cross-country skiing
1997	Bjørn Dæhlie	Norway	Cross-country skiing
1998	Fred Børre Lundberg	Norway	Nordic combined
1998	Larisa Lazutina	Russia	Cross-country skiing
1998	Alexey Prokurorov	Russia	Cross-country skiing
1998	Harri Kirvesniemi	Finland	Cross-country skiing
1999	Kazuyoshi Funaki	Japan	Ski jumping
2001	Adam Małysz	Poland	Ski jumping
2001	Bente Skari	Norway	Cross-country skiing
2001	Thomas Alsgaard	Norway	Cross-country skiing
2003	Felix Gottwald	Austria	Nordic combined
2003	Ronny Ackermann	Germany	Nordic combined
2004	Yuliya Chepalova	Russia	Cross-country skiing
2005	Andrus Veerpalu	Estonia	Cross-country skiing
2007	Frode Estil	Norway	Cross-country skiing
2007	Odd-Bjørn Hjelmeset	Norway	Cross-country skiing
2007	Harald V	Norway	Royalty
2007	Queen Sonja	Norway	Royalty
2007	Simon Ammann	Switzerland	Ski jumping
2010	Marit Bjørgen	Norway	Cross-country skiing
2011	Ole Einar Bjørndalen	Norway	Biathlon
2011	Michael Greis	Germany	Biathlon
2011	Andrea Henkel	Germany	Biathlon
2011	Janne Ahonen	Finland	Ski jumping
2012	Magdalena Neuner	Germany	Biathlon
2012	Emil Hegle Svendsen	Norway	Biathlon
2013	Tora Berger	Norway	Biathlon
2013	Martin Fourcade	France	Biathlon
2013	Therese Johaug	Norway	Cross-country skiing
2013	Gregor Schlierenzauer	Austria	Ski jumping
2014	Magnus Moan	Norway	Nordic combined
2014	Eric Frenzel	Germany	Nordic combined
2014	Thomas Morgenstern	Austria	Ski jumping
2014	Darya Domracheva	Belarus	Biathlon
2015	Eldar Rønning	Norway	Cross-country skiing
2015	Anders Bardal	Norway	Ski jumping
2015	Anette Sagen	Norway	Ski jumping
2015	Kamil Stoch	Poland	Ski jumping
2016	Noriaki Kasai	Japan	Ski jumping
2016	Tarjei Bø	Norway	Biathlon
2017	Marie Dorin Habert	France	Biathlon
2017	Sara Takanashi	Japan	Ski jumping
2018	Charlotte Kalla	Sweden	Cross-country skiing
2018	Princess Astrid	Norway	Royalty
2018	Hannu Manninen	Finland	Nordic combined
2018	Kaisa Mäkäräinen	Finland	Biathlon
2021	Maren Lundby	Norway	Ski jumping
2021	Johannes Thingnes Bø	Norway	Biathlon
2021	Dario Cologna	Switzerland	Cross-country skiing
2021	Johannes Rydzek	Germany	Nordic combined
2022	Tiril Eckhoff	Norway	Biathlon
2022	Marte Olsbu Røiseland	Norway	Biathlon
2022	Johannes Høsflot Klæbo	Norway	Cross-country skiing
2022	Jørgen Graabak	Norway	Nordic combined
2023	Maiken Caspersen Falla	Norway	Cross-country skiing
2023	Stefan Kraft	Austria	Ski jumping
2024	Jessie Diggins	United States	Cross-country skiing
2024	Simen Hegstad Krüger	Norway	Cross-country skiing
2024	Jarl Magnus Riiber	Norway	Nordic combined
2025	Iivo Niskanen	Finland	Cross-country skiing
2025	Peter Prevc	Slovenia	Ski jumping
2025	Akito Watabe	Japan	Nordic combined
2025	Dorothea Wierer	Italy	Biathlon
2025	Quentin Fillon Maillet	France	Biathlon
2026	Heidi Weng	Norway	Cross-country skiing
2026	Ebba Andersson	Sweden	Cross-country skiing
2026	Federico Pellegrino	Italy	Cross-country skiing
2026	Ryōyū Kobayashi	Japan	Ski jumping
2026	Nils-Erik Ulset	Norway	Paralympic cross-country skiing Para biathlon
2026	Franziska Preuß	Germany	Biathlon

== Gallery ==
Recipients with their medal
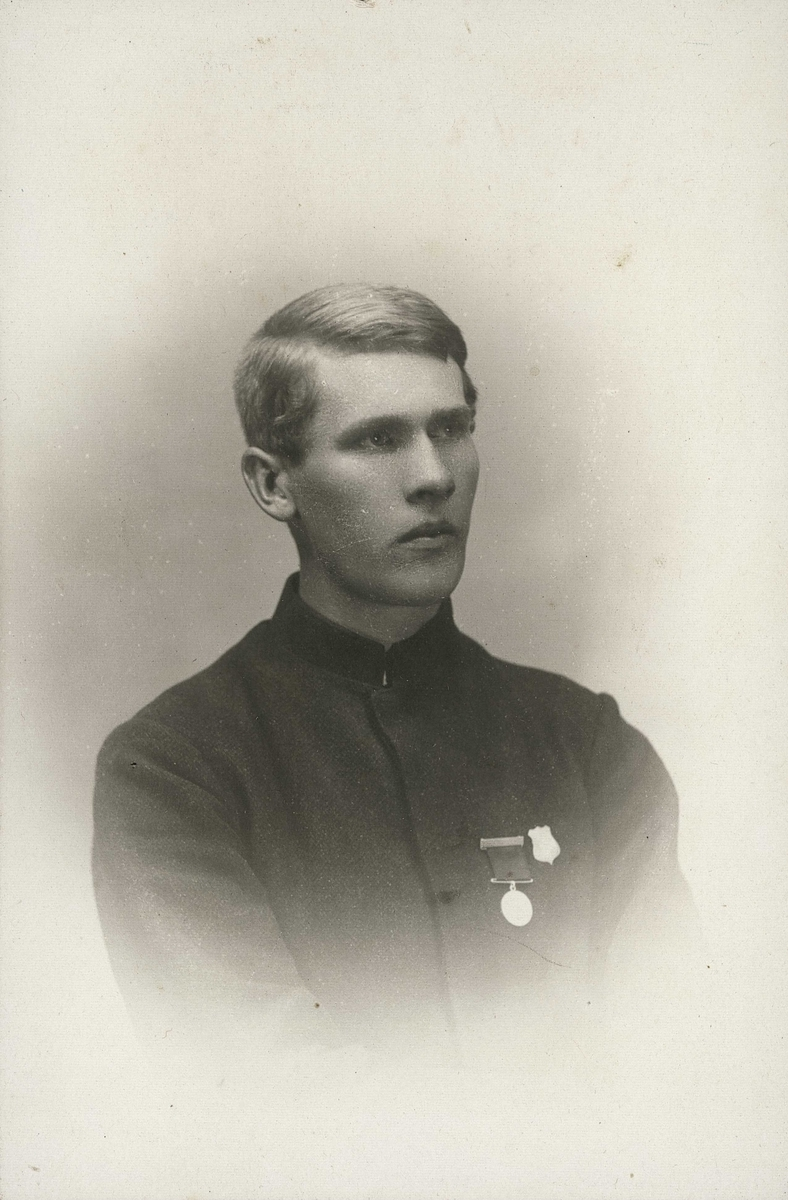
Lauritz Bergendahl, 1910

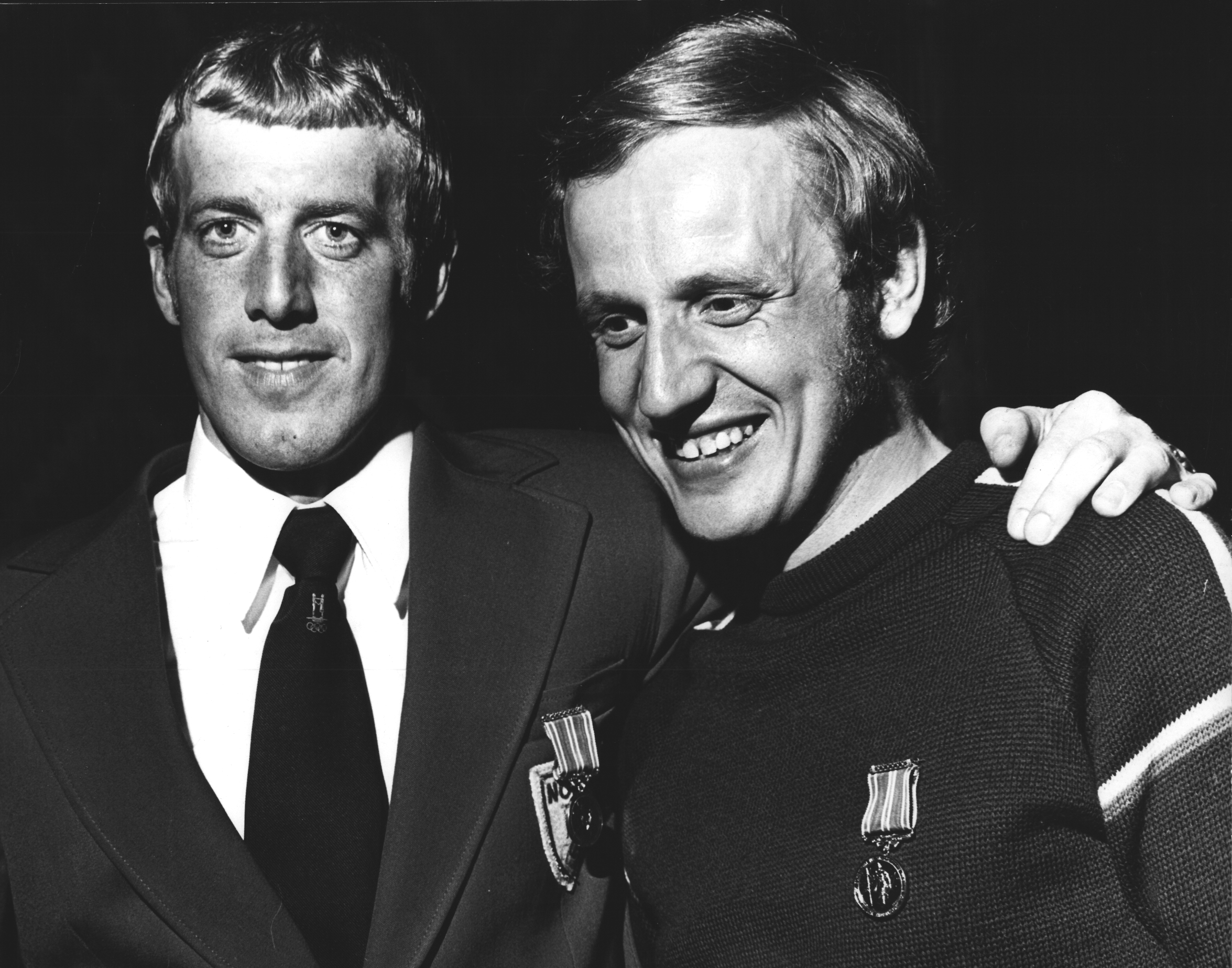
Magne Myrmo (left) and Rauno Miettinen (right), 1972

== See also ==
- History of skiing
- Holmenkollen Ski Museum
