= Einar Kristiansen =

Norwegian Nordic skier

Einar Kristiansen (18 June 1882 – 1965) was a Norwegian Nordic skiing athlete who won the Holmenkollen medal in 1908.
