= Sverre Østbye =

Norwegian Nordic skier

Sverre Østbye (28 July 1889 – 22 October 1984) was a Norwegian Nordic skier who was awarded the Holmenkollen Medal in 1915.
