= Viktor Thorn (Nordic combined skier) =

Norwegian Nordic combined skier (1874–1950)

Viktor Thorn (1874 – 11 August 1950) was a Norwegian Nordic combined athlete who won the Nordic combined event at the Holmenkollen ski festival in 1895. For that honor, Thorn became the first winner of the Holmenkollen medal that same year.
