= Magne Myrmo =

Norwegian cross-country skier (1943–2025)

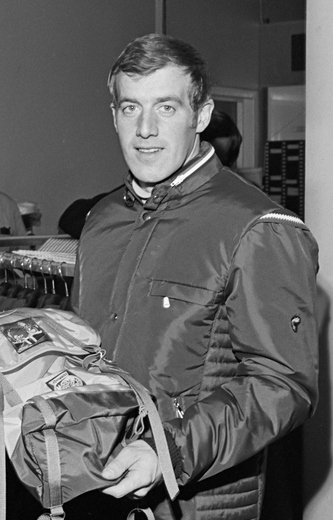
- Myrmo in 1972

Personal information
- Born: 30 July 1943 Rennebu Municipality, German-occupied Norway
- Died: 19 November 2025 (aged 82)
- Height: 177 cm (5 ft 10 in)
- Weight: 76 kg (168 lb)

Sport
- Sport: Cross-country skiing
- Club: Lyn, Oslo
Medal record
Men's cross-country skiing
Representing Norway
Olympic Games
Silver medal – second place	1972 Sapporo	50 km
World Championships
Gold medal – first place	1974 Falun	15 km
Bronze medal – third place	1974 Falun	4 × 10 km relay

Magne Gunnbjørn Myrmo (30 July 1943 – 19 November 2025) was a Norwegian cross-country skier who competed during the 1970s. He won a silver medal at the 1972 Winter Olympics in the 50 km. Myrmo won two medals at the 1974 FIS Nordic World Ski Championships in Falun with a gold in the 15 km and a bronze in the 4 × 10 km relay.

A major equipment revolution in cross-country skiing took place during 1973-74 where fiberglass skis (and later from more complex composite materials) replaced a nearly 3,000 year tradition of skis constructed of wood. The Norwegians were behind their competitors in this transition, which caught up with them at the 1974 championships in Falun. Myrmo won the 15 km less than a second ahead of East Germany's Gerhard Grimmer, who was using fiberglass skis, and it became historic, as the last world champion on wooden skis.

His biggest successes were at the Holmenkollen ski festival where Myrmo won twice at 15 km (1970 and 1972) and once at the 50 km (1974). Myrmo earned the Holmenkollen medal in 1972 (shared with Rauno Miettinen), and was named the 1974 Norwegian Athlete of the Year. After retiring from competitions he coached the national women's cross country team from 1978 to 1980.

Myrmo died on 19 November 2025, at the age of 82.

== Cross-country skiing results ==
All results are sourced from the International Ski Federation (FIS).

=== Olympic Games ===
- 1 medal – (1 silver)

Year	Age	15 km	30 km	50 km	4 × 10 km relay
1972	28	19	21	Silver	—
1976	32	55	23	—	—

=== World Championships ===
- 2 medals – (1 gold, 1 bronze)

Year	Age	15 km	30 km	50 km	4 × 10 km relay
1970	26	—	7	14	—
1974	30	Gold	17	11	Bronze
1978	34	—	23	—	—
