= Annar Ryen =

Norwegian cross-country skier

Medal record

Men's cross-country skiing

Representing Norway

World Championships
Gold medal – first place	1937 Chamonix	4 × 10 km relay

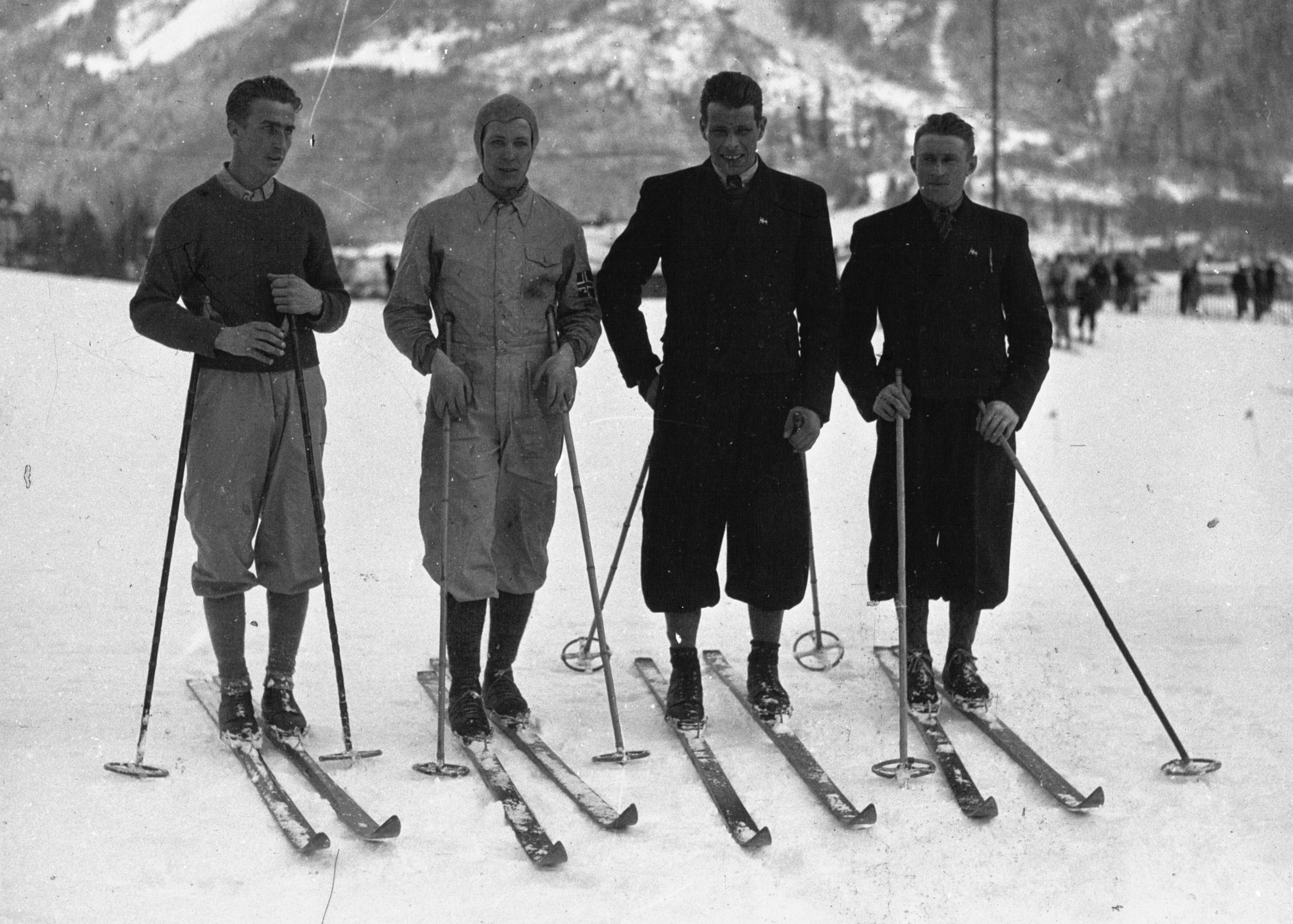
Ski de fond Chamonix 1937 - 4x10 km

Annar Ryen (19 October 1909, Os, Hedmark – 9 March 1985) was a Norwegian cross-country skier who competed in the 1930s.

He won a gold medal in the 4 × 10 km relay at the 1937 FIS Nordic World Ski Championships. Because of his successes, Ryen was awarded the Holmenkollen medal in 1940 (shared with Oscar Gjøslien). This was the last medal before World War II.

He represented the clubs Tynset IF and IL Nansen. After retiring he was a farmer in Dalsbygda in Os Municipality in Hedmark. He died in 1985.

== Cross-country skiing results ==
All results are sourced from the International Ski Federation (FIS).

=== World Championships ===
- 1 medal – (1 gold)

Year	Age	18 km	50 km	4 × 10 km relay
1934	24	36	24	—
1937	27	12	DNF	Gold
