= Rasmus Holmen =

Swedish ice hockey player

- Born: January 4, 1993 (age 32); Sweden
- Height: 5 ft 7 in (170 cm)
- Weight: 174 lb (79 kg; 12 st 6 lb)
- Position: Forward
- Shoots: Left
- Hockeyettan team Former teams: IF Vallentuna BK; AIK IF
- NHL draft: Undrafted
- Playing career: 2013–present

Rasmus Holmen (born January 4, 1993) is a Swedish ice hockey player. He is currently playing with IF Vallentuna BK of the Swedish Hockeyettan.

He made his Elitserien debut playing with AIK IF during the 2012–13 Elitserien season.
