= Harald Maartmann =

Norwegian cross-country skier (1926–2021)

Personal information
- Born: 5 January 1926 Oslo, Norway
- Died: 1 January 2021 (aged 94) Oslo

Sport
- Sport: Cross-country skiing
- Club: IL Heming

Harald Rolf Maartmann (5 January 1926 – 1 January 2021) was a Norwegian cross-country skier who competed in the 1950s. He won both the 17 km and the 50 km event in the Norwegian Championships in 1950. He finished fifth in the 50 km event at the 1950 World Championships in Lake Placid, New York. Maartmann also finished eighth in the 50 km event at the 1952 Winter Olympics in Oslo.

He was the son of soccer player Rolf Maartmann and cousin of luger Titti Maartmann. His grandfather was Harald Sigvart Maartmann, the first Executive Director of Ringnes. His great-grandfather was Norwegian politician Knud Geelmuyden Fleischer Maartmann.

Maartmann died on 1 January 2021, aged 94.

== Cross-country skiing results ==
All results are sourced from the International Ski Federation (FIS).

=== Olympic Games ===
Year	Age	18 km	50 km	4 × 10 km relay
1952	26	—	8	—

=== World Championships ===
Year	Age	18 km	50 km	4 × 10 km relay
1950	24	7	5	—
