= Jonas Holmen =

Norwegian Nordic skier

Jonas Holmen (8 August 1868 – 17 December 1953) was a Norwegian Nordic skier.

He was born in Aker, and was a member of Bærums SK. He won the King's Cup in the Husebyrennet race of 1891, and won the Holmenkollrennet race in 1894. He was awarded the Holmenkollen medal in 1905. He worked as a farmer.
