= Colorado Ski and Snowboard Hall of Fame =

Snowsports museum in Vail, Colorado

Colorado Snowsports Museum & Hall of Fame
- Abbreviation: CSM
- Predecessor: Colorado Ski and Snowboard Museum and Hall of Fame
- Formation: 1975
- Type: Nonprofit Educational Organization
- Purpose: Communicate, honor and preserve the legacy of Colorado skiing and snowboarding
- Location: Vail, Colorado
- Website: snowsportsmuseum.org
- Formerly called: Colorado Ski Museum

The Colorado Ski and Snowboard Hall of Fame is a museum and hall of fame for notable figures in skiing and snowboarding, including athletes and sport builders. It has been in Vail, Colorado, at the Vail Transportation Center since 1992.

== Exhibits ==
The facility features Colorado-centered exhibits on the US Army's 10th Mountain Division, ski equipment, fashion and resort development, Olympic, World Cup and college ski racing, and Colorado Snowsports Hall of Fame display. There is also a Resource Center for researchers and a gift shop.

== Inductees ==
- 1977 - Frank Ashley, George Cranmer, Charles Minot Dole, Father John Lewis Dyer, Thor Groswold, Carl Howelsen, Fred Iselin, Albert Johnson, Alvin Wegeman, Wallace Werner.
- 1978 - Robert Balch, Frank Bulkley, Anders Haugen, Barney McLean, Marcellus Merrill, Walter Paepcke, Peter Prestrud, Evelyn Runnette, Willy Schaeffler, Lowell Thomas, Gordon Wren.
- 1979 - Fred Bellmar, Stephen Bradley, D.R.C. Brown, Lewis Dalpes, Graeme McGowan, Ed Taylor, Sven Wiik.
- 1986 - Bob Beattie, Billy Kidd, Bill Marolt

== See also ==
- Colorado Sports Hall of Fame
- National Ski Hall of Fame
- United States Olympic & Paralympic Hall of Fame
