= Sverre Stensheim =

Norwegian cross-country skier (1933–2022)

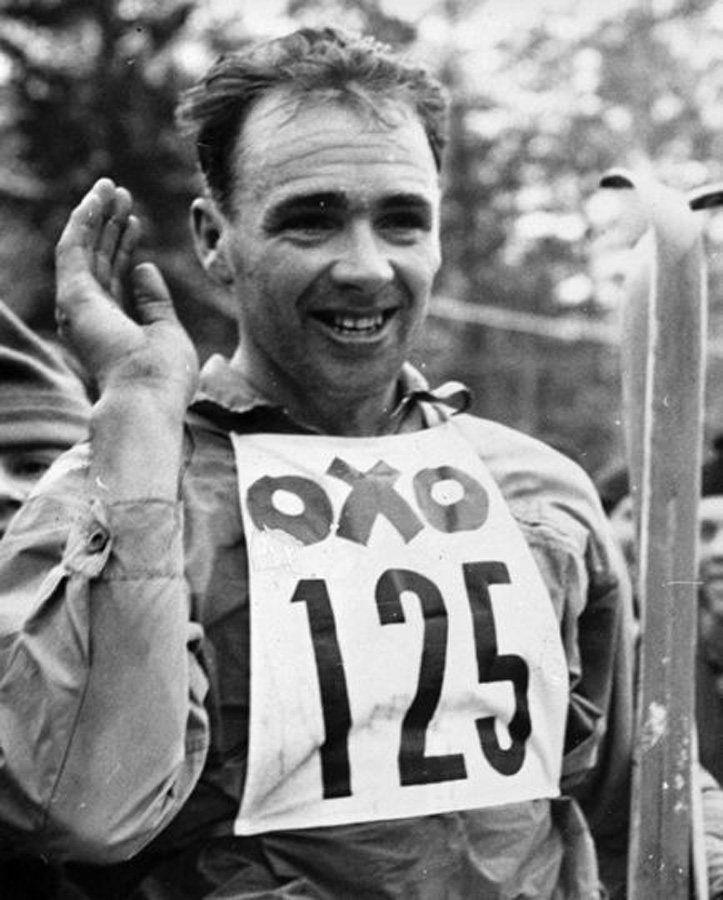
- Stensheim in 1960

Personal information
- Born: 31 October 1933 Oppdal Municipality, Norway
- Died: 22 January 2022 (aged 88)

Sport
- Sport: Cross-country skiing
- Club: IL Snøhetta, Oppdal

Sverre Malvin Stensheim (31 October 1933 – 22 January 2022) was a Norwegian cross-country skier.

== Career ==
He competed in the 30 km and 50 km events at the 1960 and 1964 Winter Olympics with the best result of fifth place in the 50 km in 1964. He won the 50 km race at the Holmenkollen ski festival in 1959–1961, and in 1960 was awarded the Holmenkollen medal (shared with Helmut Recknagel, Sixten Jernberg, and Tormod Knutsen).

Stensheim died on 22 January 2022 at the age of 88.

== Cross-country skiing results ==
All results are sourced from the International Ski Federation (FIS).

=== Olympic Games ===
Year	Age	15 km	30 km	50 km	4 × 10 km relay
1960	26	—	20	10	—
1964	30	—	11	5	—

=== World Championships ===
Year	Age	15 km	30 km	50 km	4 × 10 km relay
1954	20	39	—	—	—
1958	24	—	—	27	—
1962	28	—	13	11	—
1966	32	—	—	13	—
