= Martti Lautala =

Finnish cross-country skier

Medal record

Men's cross-country skiing

Representing Finland

World Championships
Bronze medal – third place	1954 Falun	30 km

Martti Lautala (11 November 1928 – 5 November 2016) was a Finnish former cross-country skier who competed in the 1950s. He won a bronze medal in the 30 km event at the 1954 FIS Nordic World Ski Championships in Falun.

== Cross-country skiing results ==
All results are sourced from the International Ski Federation (FIS).

=== World Championships ===
- 1 medal – (1 bronze)

Year	Age	15 km	30 km	50 km	4 × 10 km relay
1958	25	—	Bronze	—	—
