= Thorleif Haug =

Norwegian skier (1894–1934)

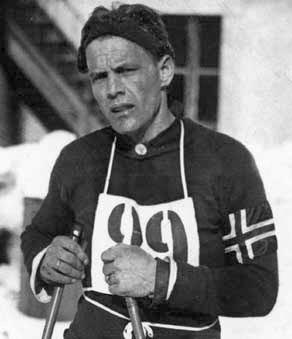
- Thorleif Haug at the 1924 Olympic Winter Games in Chamonix, France

Personal information
- Born: 28 September 1894 Vivelstad, Lier, Norway
- Died: 12 December 1934 (aged 40) Drammen, Norway

Sport
- Sport: Nordic skiing
- Club: Drafn, Drammen
Medal record
Representing Norway
Men's cross-country skiing
Olympic Games
Gold medal – first place	1924 Chamonix	18 km
Gold medal – first place	1924 Chamonix	50 km
Men's Nordic combined
Olympic Games
Gold medal – first place	1924 Chamonix	Individual
World Championships
Silver medal – second place	1926 Lahti	Individual

Thorleif Haug (28 September 1894 – 12 December 1934) was a Norwegian skier who competed in Nordic combined and cross-country. At the 1924 Olympics he won all three Nordic skiing events (18 km, 50 km and combined). He was also awarded the bronze medal in ski jumping, but 50 years later a mistake was found in calculation of scores, Haug was demoted to fourth place, and his daughter presented her father's medal to Anders Haugen.

== Biography ==
Thorleif Haug was born in Vivelstad, a narrow valley between the Lier Lier, Drammen in Buskerud county, Norway. He was raised on the Årkvisla farm.

Dominating Nordic combined and cross-country skiing events during the 1920s, he won three gold medals in the first Winter Olympics in Chamonix and was fourth in ski jumping. In addition, he won the 50 kilometres cross-country event at the Holmenkollen ski festival a record six times (1918–1921, 1923–1924) and the Nordic combined three times (1919–21). Haug shared the Holmenkollen medal in 1919 with fellow Norwegian Otto Aasen. Haug also won a silver in the Nordic combined at the 1926 FIS Nordic World Ski Championships in Lahti. Haug represented his club, SBK Drafn, Drammen.

Haug worked as a plumber after his sporting career, and died of pneumonia in 1934, 40 years old.

== Legacy ==
In 1946, a statue of Thorleif Haug by Norwegian sculptor Per Palle Storm was erected in Drammen. A road in the Voksenkollen area in Oslo was named after Haug during 1952. Since 1966, his skiing club has held a Memorial Race in his name (Thorleif Haugs Minneløp) as a part of the Thorleif Haug Ski Festival (Thorleif Haug Skifestival). The race runs from Geithus to Drammen, encompassing Haug's home at Årkvisla. Drammen has an illuminated track along Bragernesåsen named Thorleif Haug's way. Thorleif Haug Lodge was officially established 21 January 1984, as the fifth lodge of the Sons of Norway in Norway.

== Cross-country skiing results ==
All results are sourced from the International Ski Federation (FIS).

=== Olympic Games ===
- 2 medals – (2 gold)

Year	Age	18 km	50 km
1924	29	Gold	Gold

== See also ==
- List of multi-sport champions
- List of multiple Summer Olympic medalists
