= Karl Hovelsen =

Norwegian Nordic combined skier

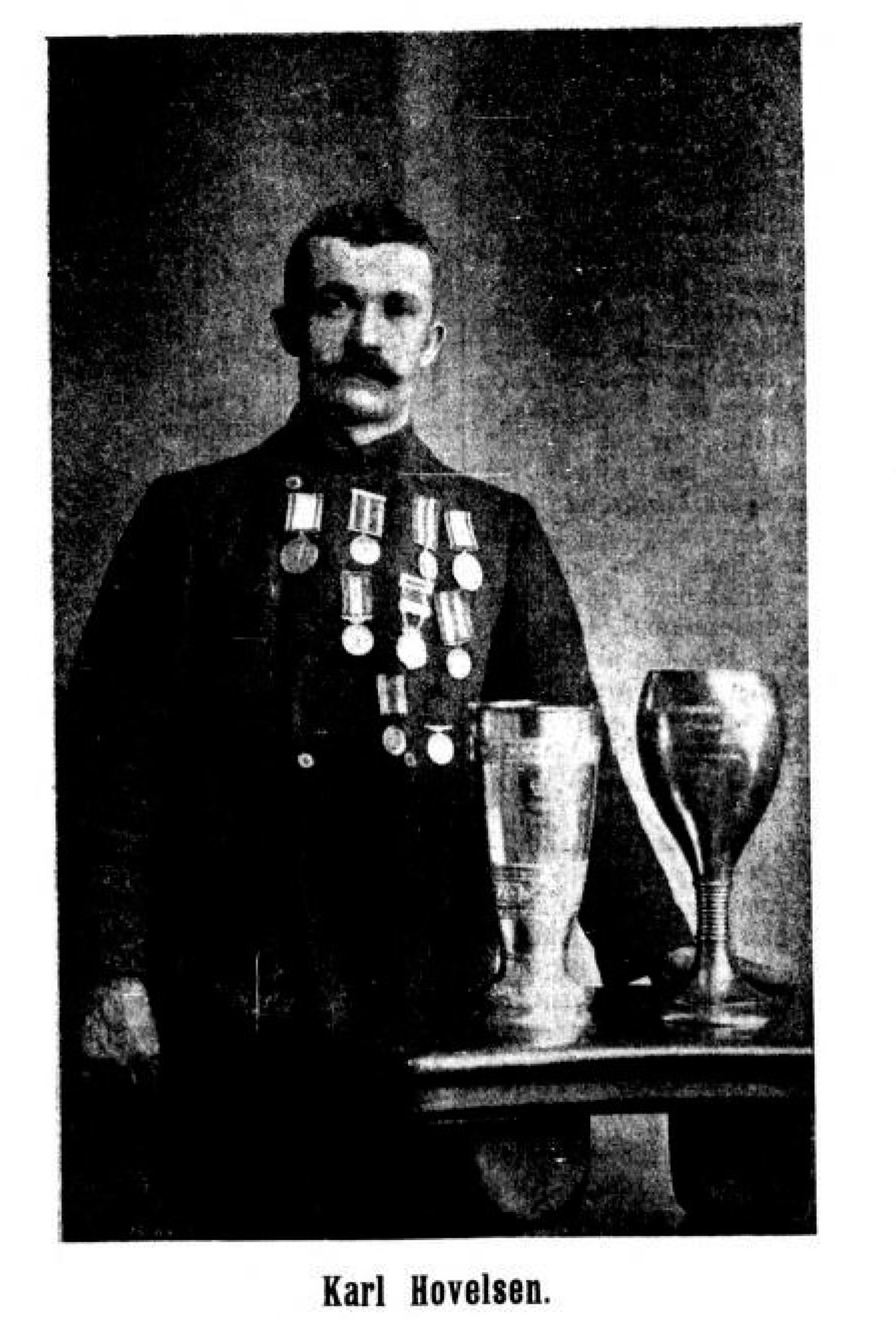
Karl Hovelsen in 1903.

Karl Frithjof Hovelsen (23 March 1877 – 13 September 1955) was a Norwegian Nordic skier. Howelsen Hill Ski Area in Steamboat Springs, Colorado was named in his honor.

== Biography ==
He was born in Kristiania (Oslo), but was a gunner for Bærums SK. He won the Nordic combined at the Holmenkollen ski festival in 1903. Hovelsen also won the 50 km cross-country skiing events both in 1902 and 1903. Hovelsen earned the Holmenkollen medal in 1903 for his victories in the 50 km and Nordic combined events that year.

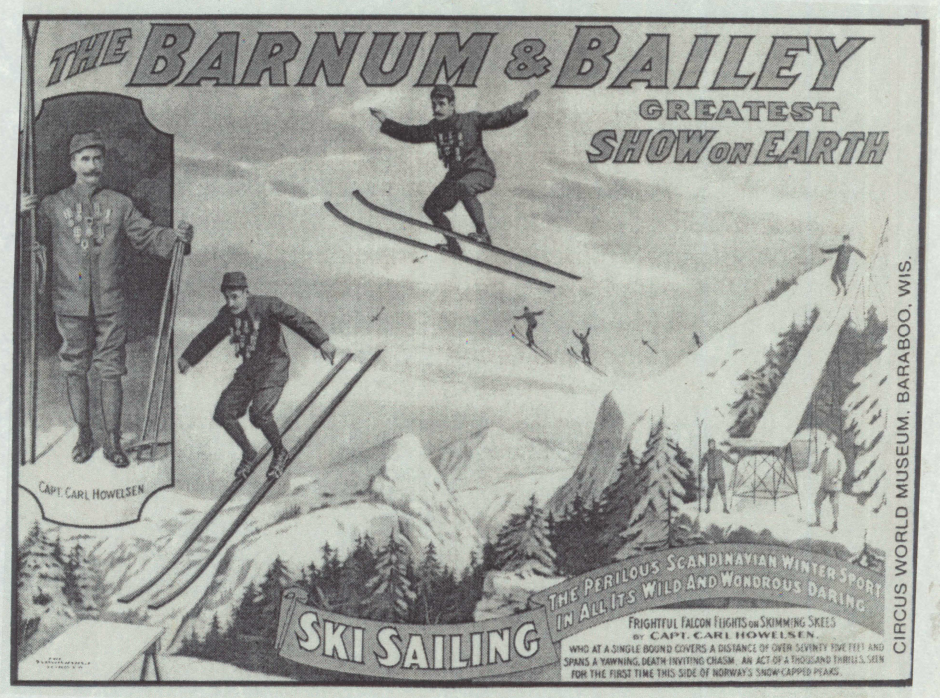
Ringling Bros. and Barnum & Bailey Circus poster from 1907 featuring Hovelsen.

In 1905, Hovelsen emigrated to the United States and settled in Colorado, where he became known as Carl Howelsen. He held training in cross-country technique and ski jumping. He was picked up by the Ringling Bros. and Barnum & Bailey Circus and made appearances which was presented as "Ski sailing" and "The Sky Rocket."

In 1914 he built a ski jump in Steamboat Springs, Colorado. He showed locals that ski jumping was an exciting new sport. The Flying Norseman, as he was called, hurled himself more than 100 feet off the jump. Howelsen Hill in downtown Steamboat Springs maintains the 30, 50-, 70-, and 90-meter jumps used by Steamboat's future Olympians as a training site. Howelsen also organized the city’s first Winter Carnival in 1914 as a way of introducing competitive skiing and a celebration of winter.

He is rated as one of the pioneers of skiing in America. In 1922 he returned to Norway to see his elderly parents, during the visit he met his future wife and lived in Norway until his death in 1955. A life-size statue of Howelsen is located on the main street of Steamboat Springs. Carl Howelsen was entered into the Colorado Ski and Snowboard Hall of Fame in 1977. A book-length biography, The Flying Norseman, was written by his son Leif Hovelsen and published in 1983 by the U.S. National Ski Hall of Fame.

== See also ==
- Howelsen Hill Ski Area
- U.S. National Ski Jumping Championships

== Other sources ==
- Borgen, Per Otto (2006)Asker og Bærum leksikon (Drammen: Forlaget for by- og bygdehistorie)
- Hovelsen, Leif (1983) The Flying Norseman (National Ski Hall of Fame)
