= Paul Braaten =

Norwegian skier

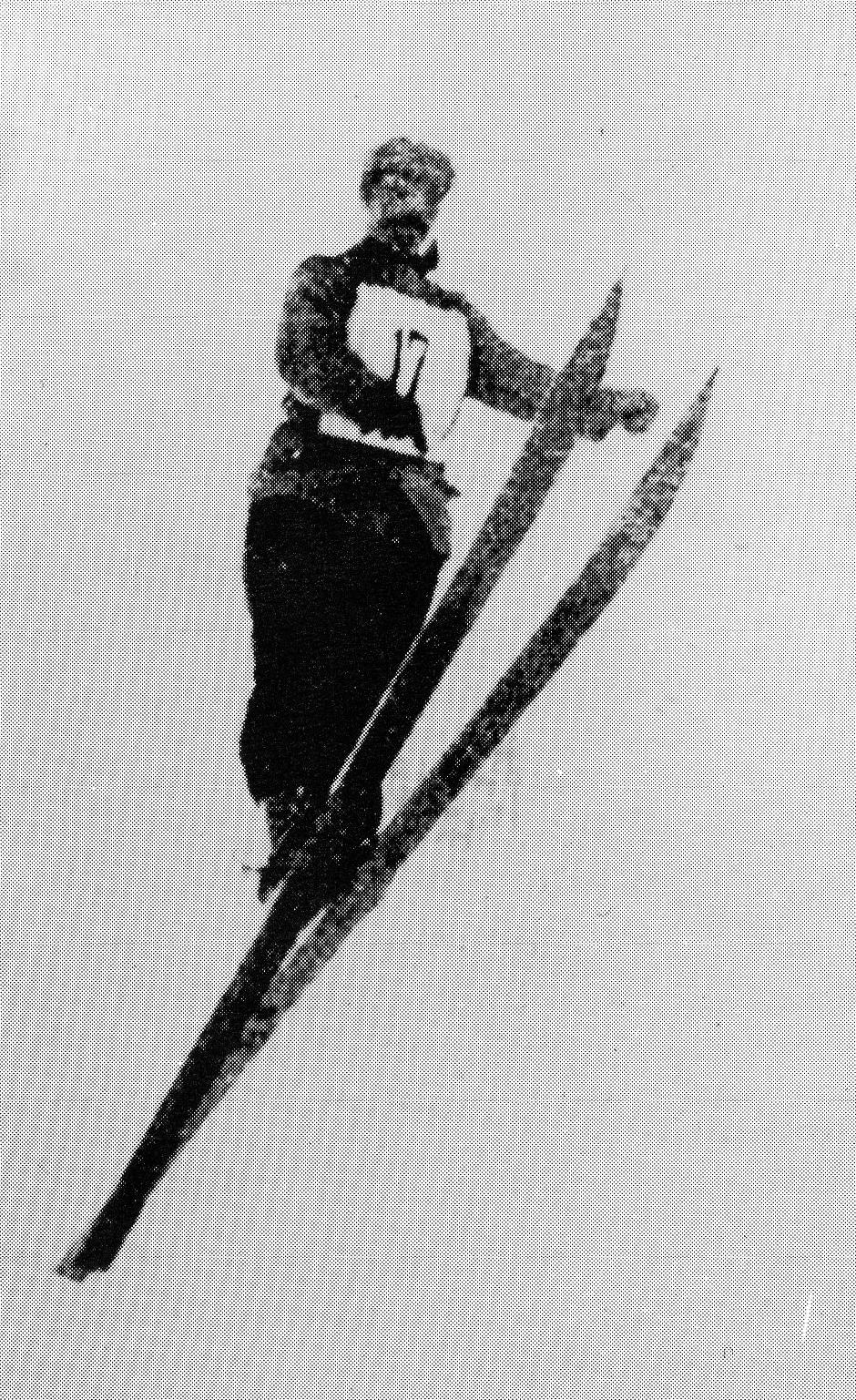
Paul Braaten

Paul Braaten (23 March 1876 – 20 January 1963) was a Norwegian Nordic skier who won the Nordic combined at the Holmenkollen ski festival in 1899. Braaten also won the men's 30 km cross-country skiing events in 1900 and 1901. For his 1899 Nordic combined victory, Braaten earned the Holmenkollen medal (shared with Robert Pehrson).
