= Holmenkollen Ski Festival =

Annual Nordic skiing event in Holmenkollen, Norway

Holmenkollen Ski Festival Holmenkollen skifestival
- Status: active
- Genre: sporting event
- Date: March
- Frequency: annual
- Venue: Holmenkollen
- Location: Oslo
- Country: Norway
- Inaugurated: 1892

The Holmenkollen Ski Festival (Norwegian: Holmenkollen skifestival or Holmenkollrennene) is a traditional annual Nordic skiing event in Holmenkollen, Oslo, Norway. The full official name of the event is Holmenkollen FIS World Cup Nordic.

== History ==
It takes place in March and has been arranged every year since 1892, except for 1898 and during World War II (1941–1945). The event is arranged by Skiforeningen and takes place at Holmenkollen National Arena and ski jumping hills Holmenkollbakken and Midtstubakken. In 2009 Holmenkollen was under renovation and replacement races were held in Trondheim for cross-country skiing and biathlon, and in Vikersund for ski jumping and Nordic combined.

In 2011, Holmenkollen hosted the FIS Nordic World Ski Championships and there was no separate Holmenkollen Ski Festival. Previously Holmekollen had hosted World Championships in 1930, 1966, 1982, and it also hosted the Nordic skiing events of 1952 Winter Olympics that were also that year's World Championships. Holmenkollen has also hosted biathlon World Championship events in 1986, 1990, 1999, 2000, and 2002, and hosted it once again in 2016.

== List of multiple winners ==
=== Current events ===
==== Men's 50 km ====
Debuted 1898

Multiple-time winners
Winner	Country	Years
Six-time winners
Thorleif Haug	Norway	1918, 1919, 1920, 1921, 1923, 1924
Five-time winners
Lauritz Bergendahl	Norway	1910, 1912, 1913, 1914, 1915
Four-time winners
Elling Rønes	Norway	1906 (40 km), 1907, 1908, 1916
Three-time winners
Veikko Hakulinen	Finland	1952, 1953, 1955
Sverre Stensheim	Norway	1959, 1960, 1961
Oddvar Brå	Norway	1975, 1979, 1981
Thomas Wassberg	Sweden	1980, 1982, 1987
Vegard Ulvang	Norway	1989, 1991, 1992
Two-time winners
Paul Braaten	Norway	1900 (30 km), 1901 (30 km)
Karl Hovelsen	Norway	1902, 1903
Sven Utterström	Sweden	1929, 1930
Nils Karlsson ("Mora-Nisse")	Sweden	1947, 1951
Arto Tiainen	Finland	1964, 1965
Pål Tyldum	Norway	1969, 1972
Gerhard Grimmer	East Germany	1970, 1971
Gunde Svan	Sweden	1986, 1990
Alexey Prokurorov	Russia	1993, 1998
Andrus Veerpalu	Estonia	2003, 2005
Anders Södergren	Sweden	2006, 2008
Petter Northug	Norway	2010, 2011
Martin Johnsrud Sundby	Norway	2016, 2017
Alexander Bolshunov	Russia	2019, 2020

==== Men's Nordic combined ====
Debuted 1892. Sprint event debuted in 1997. 10 km event since 2010, unless else noted.

Multiple-time winners
Winner	Country	Years
Seven-time winners
Bjarte Engen Vik	Norway	1996, 1997x2 (Individual, Sprint), 1998 (Individual), 1999 (Individual), 2000x2 (Individual, Sprint)
Five-time winners
Lauritz Bergendahl	Norway	1910, 1912, 1913, 1914, 1915
Johan Grøttumsbråten	Norway	1923, 1926, 1928, 1929, 1931
Rauno Miettinen	Finland	1969, 1971, 1972, 1973, 1978
Four-time winners
Georg Thoma	West Germany	1963, 1964, 1965, 1966
Akito Watabe	Japan	2012 (normal hill), 2015, 2017, 2018
Three-time winners
Thorleif Haug	Norway	1919, 1920, 1921
Oddbjørn Hagen	Norway	1932, 1934, 1935
Simon Slåttvik	Norway	1948, 1950, 1951
Sverre Stenersen	Norway	1955, 1956, 1959
Gunder Gundersen	Norway	1952, 1959, 1960
Ulrich Wehling	East Germany	1975, 1976, 1977
Ronny Ackermann	Germany	2002 (Individual), 2003 (Sprint), 2004 (Individual)
Hannu Manninen	Finland	2002 (Sprint), 2004 (Sprint), 2005 (Sprint)
Jason Lamy Chappuis	France	2010, 2011 (large hill), 2015
Two-time winners
Thorvald Hansen	Norway	1905, 1909
Otto Aasen	Norway	1917, 1918
Harald Økern	Norway	1922, 1924
Hans Vinjarengen	Norway	1930, 1933
Olaf Hoffsbakken	Norway	1936, 1939
Emil Kvanlid	Norway	1938, 1940
Tom Sandberg	Norway	1974, 1982
Hermann Weinbuch	West Germany	1985, 1987
Trond Einar Elden	Norway	1989, 1991
Felix Gottwald	Austria	2001, 2003 (Individual)
Petter Tande	Norway	2006 (Individual), 2008 (Sprint)
Eric Frenzel	Germany	2011 (normal hill), 2013
Jarl Magnus Riiber	Norway	2016, 2019

==== Women's 30 km ====
Debuted 1988

Multiple-time winners
Winner	Country	Years
Seven-time winners
Marit Bjørgen	Norway	2005, 2010, 2012, 2014, 2015, 2017, 2018
Four-time winners
Therese Johaug	Norway	2011, 2013, 2016, 2019
Three-time winners
Larisa Lazutina	Russia	1995, 1998, 2001
Yuliya Chepalova	Russia	1999, 2004, 2006
Two-time winners
Stefania Belmondo	Italy	1997, 2002

==== Men's ski jumping ====
Debuted 1933

Multiple time winners
Winner	Country	Years
Five-time winners
Adam Małysz	Poland	1996, 2001, 2003, 2006, 2007
Three-time winners
Simon Ammann	Switzerland	2002, 2007, 2010
Reidar Andersen	Norway	1936, 1937, 1938
Severin Freund	Germany	2014, 2015x2 (2x large hill)
Arne Hoel	Norway	1948, 1951, 1959
Two-time winners
Torbjørn Falkanger	Norway	1949, 1950
Helmut Recknagel	East Germany	1957, 1960
Bjørn Wirkola	Norway	1966, 1967
Vladimir Belussov	Soviet Union	1968, 1970
Ingolf Mork	Norway	1971, 1972
Matti Nykänen	Finland	1982, 1985
Jens Weißflog	East Germany	1989, 1990

==== Women's ski jumping ====
Debuted in 2000.

Multiple time winners
Winner	Country	Years
Five-time winners
Daniela Iraschko-Stolz	Austria	2000, 2001, 2003, 2011, 2019
Three-time winners
Sara Takanashi	Japan	2015, 2016, 2017
Two-time winners
Anette Sagen	Norway	2004, 2005
Sarah Hendrickson	United States	2012, 2013

==== Men's biathlon ====
Debuted 1984

Multiple-time winners
Winner	Country	Years
Ten-time winners
Martin Fourcade	France	2010x2 (Sprint, Pursuit), 2013 (Pursuit), 2014 (Mass Start), 2015 (Individual), 2016x3 (Sprint, Pursuit, Individual), 2017 (Mass Start), 2018 (Pursuit)
Eight-time winners
Sven Fischer	Germany	1995x2 (Individual, Sprint), 1999x2 (Individual, Sprint), 2001 (Mass Start), 2002 (Pursuit), 2004x2 (Individual, Pursuit)
Seven-time winners
Ole Einar Bjørndalen	Norway	2003 (Pursuit), 2004 (Sprint), 2006x3 (Sprint, Pursuit, Mass Start), 2007x2 (Pursuit, Mass Start)
Five-time winners
Raphaël Poirée	France	2000 (Mass Start), 2002 (Mass Start), 2004x2 (Pursuit, Mass Start), 2007 (Individual)
Johannes Thingnes Bø	Norway	2016 (Mass Start), 2017 (Sprint), 2019x3 (Sprint, Pursuit, Mass Start)
Three-time winners
Frank Luck	Germany	1999 (Pursuit), 2000 (Pursuit), 2002 (Sprint)
Frode Andresen	Norway	2000 (Sprint), 2001x2 (Sprint, Pursuit)
Emil Hegle Svendsen	Norway	2011x2 (Pursuit, Mass Start), 2012 (Mass Start)
Two-time winners
Peter Angerer	West Germany	1984 (Individual), 1985 (Individual)
Frank-Peter Roetsch	East Germany	1985 (Sprint), 1988 (Sprint)
Valeriy Medvedtsev	Soviet Union	1986x2 (Individual, Sprint)
Viktor Maigourov	Russia	1996x2 (Sprint, Pursuit)
Arnd Peiffer	Germany	2012 (Pursuit), 2015 (Sprint)

==== Women's biathlon ====
Debuted 1988

Multiple-time winners
Winner	Country	Years
Six-time winners
Anastasiya Kuzmina	Slovakia	2011 (Pursuit), 2014x2 (Pursuit, Mass Start), 2018 (Sprint), 2019x2 (Sprint, Pursuit)
Five-time winners
Olena Zubrilova	Ukraine until 2001/Belarus since 2002	1999x5 (Individual, Sprint, Pursuit, Mass Start), 2002 (Mass Start)
Magdalena Neuner	Germany	2007x2 (Mass Start, Pursuit), 2011 (Sprint), 2012x2 (Sprint, Pursuit)
Four-time winners
Magdalena Forsberg	Sweden	1995 (Individual), 2000 (Pursuit), 2001 (Pursuit), 2002 (Pursuit)
Liv Grete Skjelbreid	Norway	2000x2 (Sprint, Mass Start), 2001 (Sprint), 2004 (Mass Start)
Darya Domracheva	Belarus	2011 (Mass Start), 2014 (Sprint), 2015 (Sprint), 2018 (Pursuit)
Three-time winners
Uschi Disl	Germany	1995 (Sprint), 1996x2 (Sprint, Pursuit)
Martina Glagow	Germany	2003 (Pursuit), 2004 (Individual), 2006 (Sprint)
Simone Hauswald	Germany	2010x3 (Sprint, Pursuit, Mass Start)
Tora Berger	Norway	2013x3 (Sprint, Pursuit, Mass Start)
Two-time winners
Sandrine Bailly	France	2003 (Sprint), 2004 (Pursuit)
Olga Pyleva	Russia	2004x2 (Sprint, Pursuit)
Andrea Henkel	Germany	2007 (Sprint), 2012 (Mass Start)
Marie Dorin Habert	France	2016x2 (Individual, Mass Start)
Mari Laukkanen	Finland	2017x2 (Sprint, Pursuit)
Tiril Eckhoff	Norway	2016 (Sprint), 2017 (Pursuit)

=== Discontinued events ===
==== Men's 18 km ====
Competed 1933–40, 1946–55.

Multiple-time winners
Winner	Country	Years
Two-time winners
Arne Rustadstuen	Norway	1934, 1935

==== Men's 15 km ====
Competed 1954–85, 1994.

Multiple-time winners
Winner	Country	Years
Five-time winners
Juha Mieto	Finland	1973, 1974, 1975, 1977, 1978
Three-time winners
Eero Mäntyranta	Finland	1962, 1964, 1968
Two-time winners
Hallgeir Brenden	Norway	1956, 1963
Harald Grønningen	Norway	1960, 1961
Magne Myrmo	Norway	1970, 1972
Thomas Wassberg	Sweden	1979, 1985

==== Women's 5 km ====
Competed 1966–69, 1972–82, 1991.

Multiple-time winners
Winner	Country	Years
Three-time winners
Marjatta Kajosmaa	Finland	1969, 1972, 1973
Two-time winners
Hilkka Kuntola	Finland	1977, 1980

==== Women's 10 km ====
Competed 1954–83, 1986.

Multiple-time winners
Winner	Country	Years
Four-time winners
Marjatta Kajosmaa	Finland	1969, 1971, 1972, 1973
Two-time winners
Alevtina Kolchina	Soviet Union	1961, 1963
Klavdija Bojarskikh	Soviet Union	1965, 1966
Toini Gustafsson	Sweden	1967, 1968
Galina Kulakova	Soviet Union	1970, 1979

==== Women's 20 km ====
Competed 1981–85, 1987.

Multiple-time winners
Winner	Country	Years
Two-time winners
Brit Pettersen	Norway	1983, 1987
Anette Bøe	Norway	1984, 1985

== See also ==
- Holmenkollen 50 km
- Lahti Ski Games
- Swedish Ski Games
- Winter festival
