= Egeberg =

Egeberg may refer to:

Surname:

- Ferdinand Julian Egeberg (1842–1921), Norwegian military officer, chamberlain and timber merchant
- Fredrikke Egeberg (1815–1861), Norwegian pianist and composer
- Ingjerd Egeberg (born 1967), Norwegian actress and theatre director
- Ivar Egeberg (born 1950), Norwegian sports official, retired athlete and politician for the Centre Party
- Martin Egeberg (1896–1977), Norwegian sport wrestler who competed in three Summer Olympics
- Roger O. Egeberg (1902–1997), American medical educator, administrator and advocate of public health
- Westye Egeberg (1770–1830), Danish-Norwegian businessperson
- Westye Parr Egeberg (1877–1959), Norwegian military officer, businessperson and politician for the Conservative Party

Given name:

- Carsten Egeberg Borchgrevink (1864–1934), Anglo-Norwegian polar explorer and a pioneer of modern Antarctic travel
- Per Egeberg Giertsen (1906–1990), Norwegian physician, helped members of the World War II Norwegian resistance movement
- Johan Egeberg Mellbye (1866–1954), the leader of the Norwegian Centre Party in the period 1920–1921

Geography:

- Egeberg Castle (Norwegian: Egebergslottet) a building in St. Hanshaugen, Oslo, Norway
- Egeberg Glacier, small glacier flowing into the west side of Robertson Bay, Victoria Land

== See also ==
- Egbert (disambiguation)
- Eggberg
- Eikeberg
- Ekberg
- Ekeberg (surname)
- Segeberg
