= Westye Parr Egeberg =

Norwegian military officer, businessperson and politician

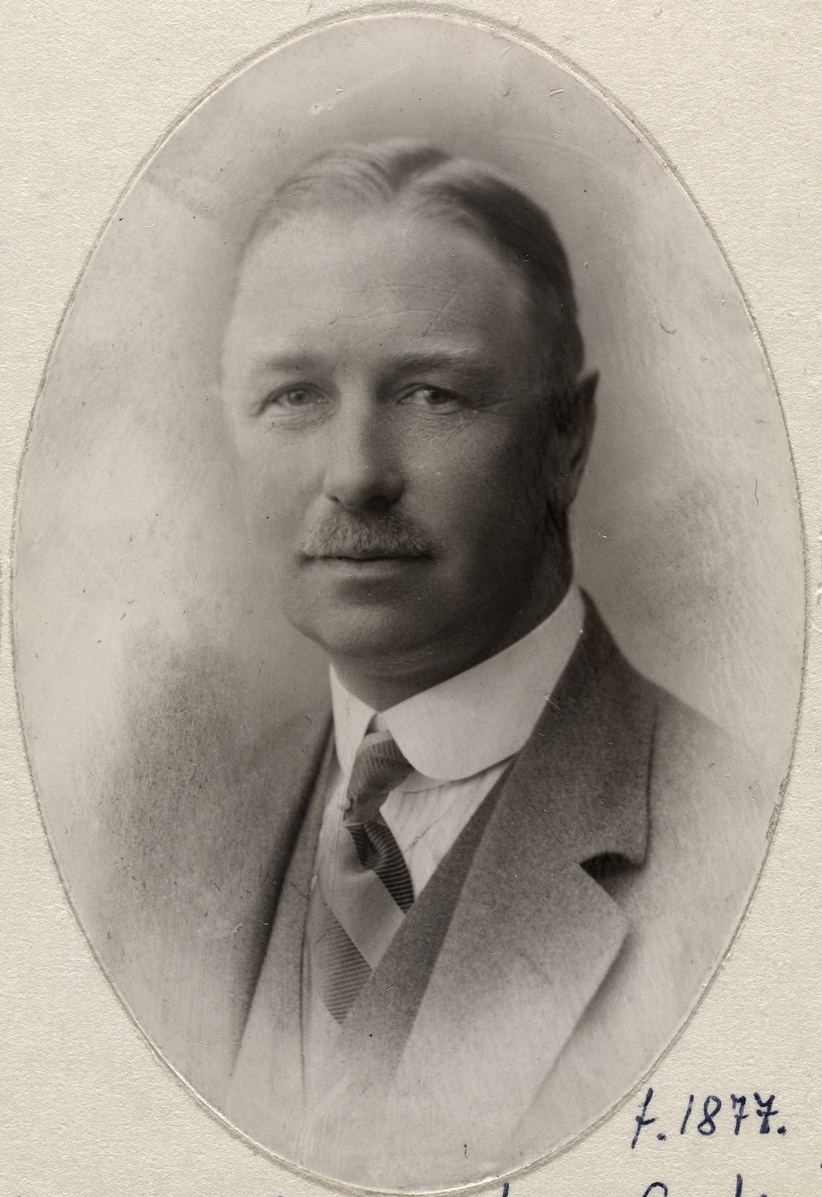
Westye in the 1930s.

Westye Parr Egeberg (21 April 1877 – 2 February 1959) was a Norwegian military officer, businessperson and politician for the Conservative Party.

== Personal life ==
He was born in Kristiania as a son of Ferdinand Julian Egeberg (1842–1921). He was an uncle of Ferdinand Finne, nephew of Einar Westye Egeberg, Sr., a great-grandson of Westye Egeberg and a grandnephew of Westye Martinus Egeberg, surgeon Christian Egeberg and composer Fredrikke Egeberg.

== Career ==
He finished his secondary education in 1896 and studied for one year at the Norwegian Military Academy, earning the rank of Second Lieutenant in 1897. After a stay abroad from 1898 to 1900, he took the cand.philol. degree in 1903 but continued his military career and became a Premier Lieutenant in 1905 and Captain in 1916. He was the vice president of Norges Forsvarsforening from 1923, having chaired the Kristiania branch from 1921. The vice president of this organization had been vacant since the death of Otto Andersen in the early 1920s because national conventions were seldom held. Egeberg was later the acting president between the death of Fritjof Nansen in 1930 and the election of new president Carl Gulbranson.

His business career was in the Westye Egeberg & Co, where he was a partner from 1911 to 1931. He settled at Bogstad Manor after his marriage to the landowner's daughter Nini Wedel-Jarlsberg (1880–1945). They were the last private owners of the manor. The property Bogstad has been owned by Oslo municipality since 1954, and the manor itself was given to the Norwegian Museum of Cultural History in 1955. Egeberg was also a board member of Glommens Tømmermåling from 1911 to 1916 (chairman 1916) and of Christiania Tømmerdirektion from 1910 (chairman since 1913). He chaired the supervisory council of Glommens Tømmermåling from 1925 to 1927 and was a supervisory council member of Union Co, Forsikringsselskapet Dovre, Wilhelmsens Rederi, A/S Tankfart I, A/S Tønsberg and Hunsfos Fabrikker.

He was a member of Aker municipal council from 1922 to 1928. He was also a board member of the animal protection society Dyrebeskyttelsen Norge from 1911 to 1923. He was active in sports and held the honorary token of the rowing club Christiania RK. He was a member of the gentlemen's skiing club SK Fram from 1895 and was made an honorary member. He chaired the club from 1905 to 1915, with a one-year interruption by Jens P. Heyerdahl, and was deputy chairman from 1924 to his death.

His daughter Lucy Egeberg (1907) married ship-owner Leif Høegh (1896–1974), and Karen Egeberg (1911–2007) married landowner Nils Fredrik Nicolai Aall (1911–1981). Egeberg died in February 1959 and was buried in Ullern.
