= Einar Westye Egeberg Sr. =

Norwegian businessperson and politician

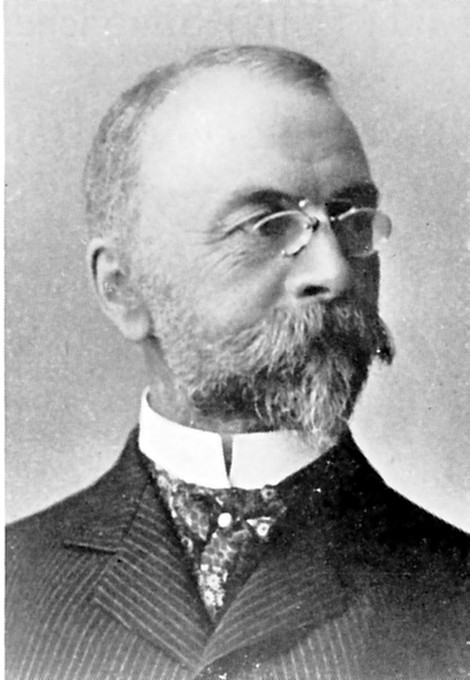
- Einar Westye Egeberg Sr.
- Born: 23 July 1851; Kristiania
- Died: 7 June 1940 (aged 88)
- Occupations: businessperson and politician

Einar Westye Egeberg Sr. (23 July 1851 – 7 June 1940) was a Norwegian businessperson and politician for the Conservative Party.

== Personal life ==
He was born in Kristiania as a son of Peder Cappelen Egeberg (1810–1874) and Hanna Wilhelmine Scheel. He was a brother of Ferdinand Julian Egeberg, first cousin of physician Theodor Christian Egeberg, a grandson of Westye Egeberg and a nephew of Westye Martinus Egeberg, surgeon Christian Egeberg and composer Fredrikke Egeberg. Through his brother he was an uncle of Westye Parr Egeberg, and through a sister he was a granduncle of Ferdinand Finne.

In September 1877 in Østre Aker he married Birgitte Halvordine Schou, a daughter of Halvor Schou. His own daughter Hermine Egeberg was married to Lord Chamberlain Peder Anker Wedel Jarlsberg. In turn, a daughter of theirs married diplomat Peter Martin Anker.

== Career ==
He is best known as the co-owner of the family company Westye Egeberg & Co, founded by his grandfather. He was hired in the company in 1867, and in 1874 he took over the company from his father together with his brother Ferdinand. He acquired burghership in Kristiania in 1882.

He was a member of the executive committee of Kristiania city council from 1891 to 1894. He was a deputy representative to the Parliament of Norway during the term 1892–1894, representing the urban constituency Kristiania, Hønefoss og Kongsvinger. He was also a board member of Kristiania Port Authority, and chaired Christiania Handelsstands Forening from 1904 to 1908. In 1905 he was declared a lifetime member of the International Law Association. He was also behind the construction (1899–1901) of the Egeberg Castle, which he sold after his wife's death.
