= Magnar Lundemo =

Norwegian cross-country skier (1938–1987)

Magnar Lundemo (4 March 1938 in Meråker – 7 January 1987 in Meråker) was a Norwegian cross-country skier and track and field athlete. As a skier he participated in two Olympic Games and placed fourth at the 1962 World Championships. In the athletics he took several national titles, and recorded one nineteenth place at the 1962 European Championships. He was also a coach.

== Skiing ==
He was national champion in cross-country skiing (15 kilometres) in 1961. He placed fourth in the same event at the Nordic World Ski Championships 1962, and also participated in the 1960 and 1964 Winter Olympics. In 1960 he placed sixteenth in the 30 km event, while in 1964 he placed eighth in the 15 km event and fourth in the 4 × 10 km relay event. Teammates in the latter event were Erling Steineide, Einar Østby and Harald Grønningen. Lundemo later coached the Norwegian national cross-country skiing team from 1978 to 1984.

He represented the club IL Varden in Meråker Municipality. A statue of him was erected in Meråker in 1991. He was also decorated with the Egeberg Honorary Prize (Norwegian: Egebergs Ærespris) for successful sportspeople of multiple sports, in 1962. Ole Ellefsæter, the next winner of this prize, was a skier-runner as well.

== Athletics ==
In athletics, Lundemo won ten national titles in Norway. He won the 10,000 metres title in 1961 and 1962, the marathon title in 1964, the 25 kilometres road race in 1961, 1962, 1963 and 1964, the 8 kilometres cross-country race in 1960, the cross-country single start race in 1961 and 1962. In the 10,000 metres, the 8 kilometres cross-country and the cross-country single start he also won silver and bronze medals, the last time in 1968. He competed once in an international event, when he finished nineteenth in the 10,000 metres event at the 1962 European Championships.

His personal best time in the 10,000 metres was 29:30.4 minutes, achieved in September 1966 at Bislett stadion. In the marathon he had 2:27:00 hours as a personal best, achieved in September 1964 in Södertälje.

== Cross-country skiing results ==
All results are sourced from the International Ski Federation (FIS).

=== Olympic Games ===
Year	Age	15 km	30 km	50 km	4 × 10 km relay
1960	22	—	16	—	—
1964	26	8	—	—	4

=== World Championships ===
Year	Age	15 km	30 km	50 km	4 × 10 km relay
1962	24	4	—	—	4

Awards and achievements
Preceded by Arne Bakker	Egebergs Ærespris; 1962	Succeeded by Ole Ellefsæter
