= Reidar Andreassen =

Norwegian long distance runner and cross-country skier

Personal information
- Born: 19 December 1932 (age 93) Herefoss, Norway

Sport
- Sport: Athletics; Cross-country skiing
- Event(s): 10,000 metres 5000 metres 3000 metres steeplechase 50 kilometres cross-country skiing
- Club: Herefoss IL; IL i BUL

Reidar Andreassen (born 19 December 1932) is a retired Norwegian long-distance runner and cross-country skier. He was national champion in both athletics and skiing and competed internationally in skiing. He has received the Egebergs Ærespris, and award for excelling in one sport and showing eminent performance in another different sport.

== Career ==
Andreassen was Norwegian champion in 10,000 metres in 1960. He also took silver medals in the 3000 metres steeplechase in 1957 and 1958, and in the 5000 metres in 1959. His personal best times were 1:55.4 in the 800 metres (1960), 3:50.1 in the 1500 metres (1960), 8:12.2 in the 3000 metres (1960), 9:04.6 in the 3000 metres steeplechase (1958), 14:21.6 in the 5000 metres (1960) and 30:05.0 in the 10,000 metres (1960).

He was Norwegian champion in the 50 km in 1958 and 1960, and competed at the FIS Nordic World Ski Championships 1958. Here he finished as the best Norwegian in 20th place in the 50 kilometres race, which stood as the worst performance by the Norwegian team until 2003. He was awarded Egebergs Ærespris in 1960. He represented the clubs Herefoss IL and IL i BUL.

== Cross-country skiing results ==
=== World Championships ===
Year	Age	15 km	30 km	50 km	4 × 10 km relay
1958	25	—	—	20	—

== Personal life ==
Andreassen was born in Herefoss on 19 December 1932. His brother Ivar was also a national champion in athletics and skiing (relay). Reidar Andreassen is the uncle of biathlete Gunn Margit Andreassen.

Awards
Preceded by Roald Aas (1956)	Egebergs Ærespris; 1960	Succeeded by Arne Bakker
