= Knotten =

Knotten is a surname. Notable people with the surname include:

- Guri Knotten (born 1974), Norwegian cross-country skier
- Iver Knotten (born 1998), Norwegian cyclist
- Karoline Offigstad Knotten (born 1995), Norwegian biathlete
