= Ekeberg (disambiguation) =

Ekeberg is a neighborhood in the city of Oslo, Norway. It may also refer to:

- Ekeberg (surname), list of people with the surname
- Ekeberg Line, light rail line of the Oslo Tramway
