= Egebergs Ærespris =

Norwegian athletics award

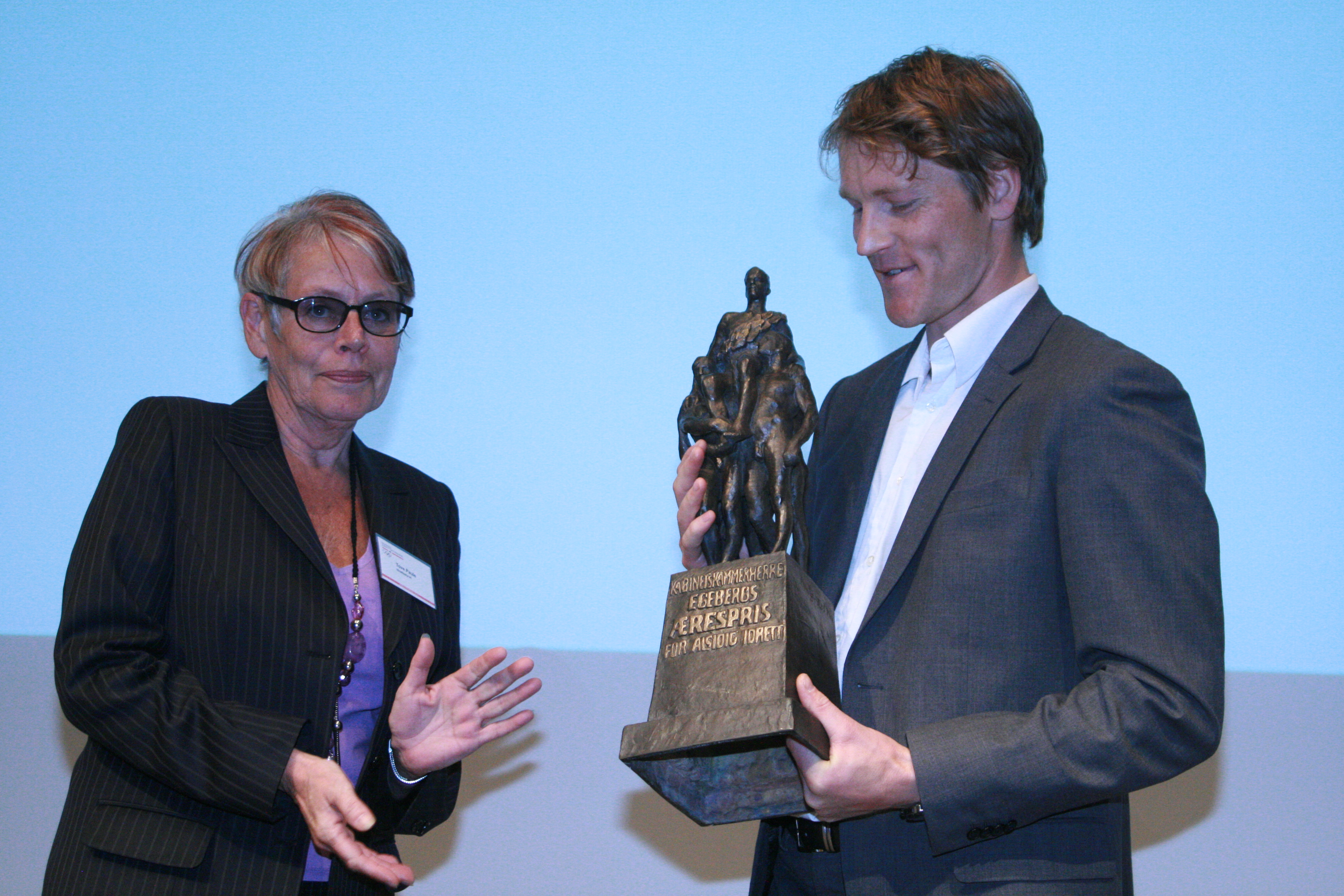
Jens Arne Svartedal received the prize in 2011

The Egebergs Ærespris ("Honorary Prize of Egeberg") is a prize awarded to Norwegian athletes who excel in more than one sport. The prize was created by Ferdinand Julian Egeberg, and consists of a bronze statuette modelled by sculptor Magnus Vigrestad.

== History ==
In 1917 a donation of 10,000 kr was given by Cabinet Chamberlain Ferdinand Julian Egeberg to the sports association Norges Riksforbund for Idræt. His donation was the basis for the sports prize Kabinetskammerherre Egebergs ærespris for alsidig idrett. The statutes for the award were agreed on 10 February 1920. The basic capital was not to be touched, while the fund's interests should be used for a prize given to a sportsperson who, during the last two years, had excelled in one sport and also showed eminent performances in another, completely different, sport. The prize is a bronze statuette modelled by sculptor Magnus Vigrestad, who won the design competition. The prize was regarded the highest achievement in Norwegian sport at the time. The statutes have changed slightly over the years. Today the prize is awarded by the Norwegian Olympic and Paralympic Committee and Confederation of Sports, and given to Norwegian sports people who have excelled nationally in at least two sports, and excelled internationally in at least one of these. The first awardee was skier and football player Gunnar Andersen, who received the prize for 1918. The first female recipient was Laila Schou Nilsen, who received the prize for 1936 for her achievements in skiing, speed-skating and tennis. In 1983 Cato Zahl Pedersen received the prize (for 1981) for disabled sports.

== Award winners ==
The award has been given to the following athletes:

- 1918 Gunnar Andersen - football and ski jumping
- 1919 Helge Løvland - track and field and gymnastics
- 1921 Harald Strøm - speed skating and football
- 1922 Ole Reistad - cross-country skiing and track and field
- 1926 Johan Støa - cross-country skiing and track and field
- 1928 Bernt Evensen - speed skating and cycling
- 1929 Armand Carlsen - speed skating and cycling
- 1929 Reidar Jørgensen - cross-country skiing and track and field
- 1931 Fritjof Bergheim - gymnastics and track and field
- 1934 Otto Berg - gymnastics and track and field
- 1935 Bjarne Bryntesen - cross-country skiing and track and field
- 1936 Laila Schou Nilsen - cross-country skiing, speed skating and tennis
- 1937 Johan Haanes - tennis and cross-country skiing
- 1938 Henry Johansen - cross-country skiing and football
- 1939 Arne Larsen - cross-country skiing and track and field
- 1946 Godtfred Holmvang - athletics and alpine skiing
- 1947 Sverre Farstad - speed skating and weightlifting
- 1949 Martin Stokken - cross-country skiing and track and field
- 1950 Egil Lærum - cross-country skiing and football
- 1951 Hjalmar Andersen - speed skating and cycling
- 1952 Hallgeir Brenden - cross-country skiing and track and field
- 1956 Roald Aas - speed skating and cycling
- 1960 Reidar Andreassen - cross-country skiing and track and field
- 1961 Arne Bakker - football and bandy
- 1962 Magnar Lundemo - cross-country skiing and track and field
- 1965 Ole Ellefsæter - cross-country skiing and track and field
- 1967 Fred Anton Maier - speed skating and cycling
- 1971 Frithjof Prydz - tennis and ski jumping
- 1971 Bjørn Wirkola - ski jumping and football
- 1973 Ivar Formo - cross-country skiing and orienteering
- 1975 Eystein Weltzien - orienteering and cross-country skiing
- 1980 Bjørg Eva Jensen - speed skating and cycling
- 1981 Cato Zahl Pedersen - disabled sports
- 1987 Oddvar Brå - cross-country skiing and track and field
- 1988 Ragnhild Bratberg - cross-country skiing and orienteering
- 1990 Grete Ingeborg Nykkelmo – cross-country skiing and biathlon
- 1991 Birger Ruud – ski jumping and alpine skiing
- 1992 Ingrid Kristiansen - track and field and cross-country skiing
- 1996 Anita Andreassen - mushing, cycling and cross-country skiing
- 2000 Anette Bøe - cross-country skiing, triathlon, mountain biking and ice hockey
- 2001 Anders Aukland — cross-country skiing, triathlon, sled dog racing and track and field
- 2002 Ole Einar Bjørndalen - biathlon and cross-country skiing
- 2002 Hilde Gjermundshaug Pedersen - ski orienteering and cross-country skiing
- 2004 Trond Einar Elden – Nordic combined, cross-country skiing and track and field
- 2005 Stein Johnson – former multi-sports coach
- 2006 Lars Berger - biathlon and cross-country skiing
- 2009 Frode Andresen - biathlon and cross-country skiing
- 2009 Helge Bjørnstad - sledge hockey and swimming (disability sports)
- 2010 Jens Arne Svartedal - cross-country skiing and duathlon.
- 2010 Hedda Berntsen – skiing (telemark, alpine, ski cross).
- 2011 Kristin Størmer Steira - cross-country skiing and track and field.
- 2012 Odd-Bjørn Hjelmeset – cross-country skiing and track and field.
- 2013 Mariann Vestbøstad Marthinsen - sitski and swimming.
- 2015 Astrid Uhrenholdt Jacobsen - cross-country skiing and Track and field.
- 2018 Nils Erik Ulset – biathlon and cross-country skiing (disability sports).
- 2019 Birgit Skarstein – rowing and cross-country skiing.
- 2020 Therese Johaug – skiing and track and field.
- 2023 Ragne Wiklund – speed skating and orienteering.
- 2025 Jørgen Baklid – ski orienteering, orientering and winter duathlon.
- 2025 Kasper Harlem Fosser – orienteering and cross country running.
