= Roald Aas =

Norwegian speed skater and cyclist (1928–2012)

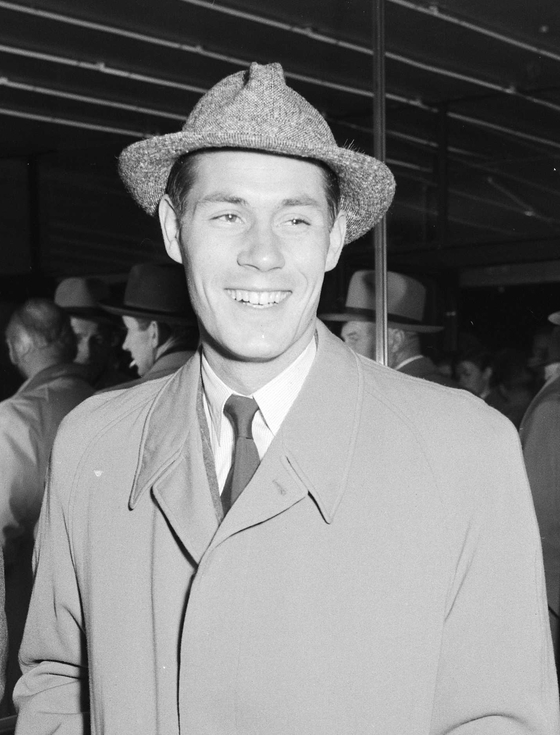
- Roald Aas in 1952

Personal information
- Nationality: Norwegian
- Born: Roald Edgar Aas; 25 March 1928 Oslo, Norway
- Died: 18 February 2012 (aged 83) Oslo, Norway

Sport
- Country: Norway
- Sport: Speed skating
- Club: Oslo Idrettslag; Oslo Skøiteklub

Achievements and titles
- Personal bests: 500 m: 42.3 (1960); 1500 m: 2:10.4 (1960); 3000 m: 4:41.7 (1958); 5000 m: 8:01.6 (1956); 10 000 m: 17:08.1 (1956)
Medal record
Men's speed skating
Representing Norway
Olympic Games
Gold medal – first place	1960 Squaw Valley	1500 m
Bronze medal – third place	1952 Oslo	1500 m

Roald Edgar Aas (25 March 1928 – 18 February 2012) was a speed skater and cyclist from Norway. He was born in Oslo. Aas was the number two speed skater in Norway through the entire 1950s—initially after Hjalmar Andersen, later after Knut Johannesen. He became Norwegian champion once, in 1956, but finished second seven times.

Aas participated in all international championships between 1951 and 1960, almost always finishing in the top ten. He won bronze at the World Allround Speed Skating Championships in 1958, and at two European Speed Skating Championships, in 1957 and 1960. At the Oslo Winter Olympics, he won bronze on the 1500 m, while at the Squaw Valley Winter Olympics in 1960, he finally won gold, shared with Yevgeny Grishin, also in 1500 m.

Aas also was a successful cyclist, winning the 1956 Norwegian Championships in both road cycling and track cycling. For his achievements as both a speed skater and a cyclist, Aas was awarded the prestigious Egebergs Ærespris in 1956.

Until 1956, Aas represented Oslo Idrettslag (Oslo Sports Club) – from 1957 on, he represented Oslo Skøiteklub (Oslo Skating Club). When he ended his skating career, he became a coach at Oslo Skøiteklub.

After his retirement, he worked as a stock manager for Jordan Dental.

== Medals ==
An overview of medals won by Aas at important championships he participated in, listing the years in which he won each:

Championships	Gold medal	Silver medal	Bronze medal
Winter Olympics	1960 (1500 m)	–	1952 (1500 m)
World Allround	–	–	1958
European Allround	–	–	1957; 1960
Norwegian Allround	1956	1952; 1953; 1955; 1957; 1958; 1959; 1960	1951

== Personal records ==
To put these personal records in perspective, the WR column lists the official world records on the dates that Aas skated his personal records.

Event	Result	Date	Venue	WR
500 m	42.3	28 February 1960	Squaw Valley	40.2
1000 m	1:27.4			
1500 m	2:10.4	26 February 1960	Squaw Valley	2:06.3
3000 m	4:41.7	22 March 1958	Geilo	4:40.2
5000 m	8:01.6	29 January 1956	Misurina	7:45.6
10000 m	17:08.2	19 January 1958	Notodden	16:32.6

Aas has an Adelskalender score of 185.337 points. His highest ranking on the Adelskalender was a thirteenth place.

Awards
Preceded by Hallgeir Brenden	Egebergs Ærespris; 1956	Succeeded by Reidar Andreassen
