= Egil Lærum =

Norwegian footballer, ski jumper, and athlete

Egil Lærum (11 August 1921 – 27 November 1954) was a Norwegian footballer, ski jumper and athlete.

In association football, he played the wing half position for the clubs Vålerengen and Larvik Turn. Eika also won 16 caps for Norway. In ski jumping, he won the "women's cup" in 1947 and finished eighth in the Holmenkollen event in 1948. He represented the clubs Stranden IL and Vikersund IF in skiing. In athletics, he won the Norwegian junior championship in javelin throw in 1946. He represented Larvik Turn in athletics as well.

He also competed in team handball, bandy, gymnastics, swimming and dogsled racing. He was awarded the prize for versatility, Egebergs Ærespris, in 1950.

He died in 1954, 33 years old, after a long-term illness.

Awards
Preceded by Martin Stokken	Egebergs Ærespris; 1950	Succeeded by Hjalmar Andersen
