= Erling Steineide =

Norwegian cross-country skier (1938–2019)

Personal information
- Nationality: Norwegian
- Born: 10 August 1938 Heidal, Norway
- Died: 9 October 2019 (aged 81)

Sport
- Sport: Cross-country skiing

Erling Øistein Steineide (10 August 1938 – 9 October 2019) was a Norwegian cross-country skier, born in Heidal. He participated at the 1964 Winter Olympics, where he placed fourth in the 4 × 10 km relay event, together with teammates Magnar Lundemo, Einar Østby and Harald Grønningen. He was Norwegian cross-country skiing champion in 15 km in 1965.

Steineide died on 9 October 2019, 81 years old.

== Cross-country skiing results ==
=== Olympic Games ===
Year	Age	15 km	30 km	50 km	4 × 10 km relay
1964	25	—	—	—	4

=== World Championships ===
Year	Age	15 km	30 km	50 km	4 × 10 km relay
1970	31	—	23	—	4
