= Lene Jenssen =

Norwegian swimmer (born 1957)

Personal information
- Nationality: Norwegian
- Born: 22 April 1957 (age 69) Fredrikstad, Østfold
- Height: 1.78 m (5 ft 10 in)
- Weight: 62 kg (137 lb)
- Spouse: Per Holmertz

Sport
- Sport: Swimming
- Strokes: Freestyle
- Club: Kongstensvømmerne
Medal record
Women's swimming
Representing Norway
World Championships
| Silver medal – second place | 1978 Berlin | 100 m freestyle |

Lene Jenssen (born 22 April 1957) is a Norwegian former freestyle swimmer.

She competed at the 1978 World Aquatics Championships in Berlin, where she won a silver medal in 100 m freestyle.

She also participated at the 1976 Summer Olympics.

Jenssen won 17 gold medals in national championships, and received the King's Cup three times (1976, 1978 and 1979). She was elected Norwegian Sportsperson of the Year 1978.

| Preceded by Grete Waitz | Norwegian Sportsperson of the Year; 1978 | Succeeded by Grete Waitz |
