= Norwegian Sportsperson of the Year =

Annual Norwegian sports award

- Country: Norway

History
- First award: 1948

The Norwegian Sportsperson of the Year (Norwegian: Årets Idrettsnavn) is an annual award given by the Norwegian Association of Sports Journalists (Norwegian: Norske sportsjournalisters forbund).

== List of winners ==
Sportsperson of the Year
Year	Winner(s)	Sport(s)
1948	Petter Hugsted	Ski jumping
1949	Martin Stokken	Cross-country skiing
1950	Sverre Strandli	Athletics
1951	Stein Eriksen	Alpine skiing
1952	Hjalmar Andersen	Speed skating
1953	Sverre Strandli	Athletics
1954	Stein Eriksen	Alpine skiing
1955	Audun Boysen	Athletics
1956	Egil Danielsen	Athletics
1957	Magne Lystad	Orienteering
1958	Inger Bjørnbakken	Alpine skiing
1959	Torbjørn Yggeseth	Ski jumping
1960	Knut Johannesen	Speed skating
1961	Harald Grønningen	Cross-country skiing
1962	Toralf Engan	Ski jumping
1963	Reidar Hjermstad	Cross-country skiing
1964	Terje Pedersen	Athletics
1965	Per Ivar Moe	Speed skating
1966	Gjermund Eggen	Cross-country skiing
1967	Bjørn Wirkola	Ski jumping
1968	Fred Anton Maier	Speed skating
1969	Dag Fornæss	Speed skating
1970	Stig Berge	Orienteering
1971	Leif Jenssen	Weightlifting
1972	Knut Knudsen	Track cycling
1973	Knut Knudsen	Track cycling
1974	Magne Myrmo	Cross-country skiing
1975	Grete Andersen	Athletics
1976	Ivar Formo	Cross-country skiing
1977	Grete Waitz	Athletics
1978	Lene Jenssen	Swimming
1979	Grete Waitz	Athletics
1980	Bjørg Eva Jensen	Speed skating
1981	Tom Lund	Football
1982	Berit Aunli	Cross-country skiing
1983	Grete Waitz	Athletics
1984	Eirik Kvalfoss	Biathlon
1985	Anette Bøe	Cross-country skiing
1986	Ingrid Kristiansen	Athletics
1987	Ingrid Kristiansen	Athletics
1988	Jon Rønningen	Wrestling
1989	Ole Kristian Furuseth	Alpine skiing
1990	Atle Skårdal	Alpine skiing
1991	Johann Olav Koss	Speed skating
1992	Vegard Ulvang	Cross-country skiing
1993	Norway national football team	Football
1994	Johann Olav Koss	Speed skating
1995	Bjørn Dæhlie	Cross-country skiing
1996	Vebjørn Rodal	Athletics
1997	Hanne Haugland, Nils Arne Eggen	Athletics, football (coach)
1998	Bjørn Dæhlie	Cross-country skiing
1999	Lasse Kjus	Alpine skiing
2000	Trine Hattestad	Athletics
2001	Olaf Tufte	Rowing
2002	Ole Einar Bjørndalen	Biathlon
2003	Petter Solberg	Rallying
2004	Andreas Thorkildsen	Athletics
2005	Marit Bjørgen	Cross-country skiing
2006	Kjetil André Aamodt	Alpine skiing
2007	Aksel Lund Svindal	Alpine skiing
2008	Andreas Thorkildsen	Athletics
2009	Petter Northug	Cross-country skiing
2010	Thor Hushovd	Road bicycle racing
2011	Alexander Dale Oen	Swimming
2012	Tora Berger	Biathlon
2013	Magnus Carlsen	Chess
2014	Ole Einar Bjørndalen	Biathlon
2015	Petter Northug	Cross-country skiing
2016	Ada Hegerberg	Football
2017	Karsten Warholm	Athletics
2018	Jakob Ingebrigtsen	Athletics
2019	Karsten Warholm	Athletics
2020	Erling Haaland	Football
2021	Karsten Warholm	Athletics
2022	Jakob Ingebrigtsen	Athletics
2023	Viktor Hovland	Golf
2024	Markus Rooth	Athletics
2025	Erling Haaland	Football
