= Guri Hetland =

Norwegian cross-country skier

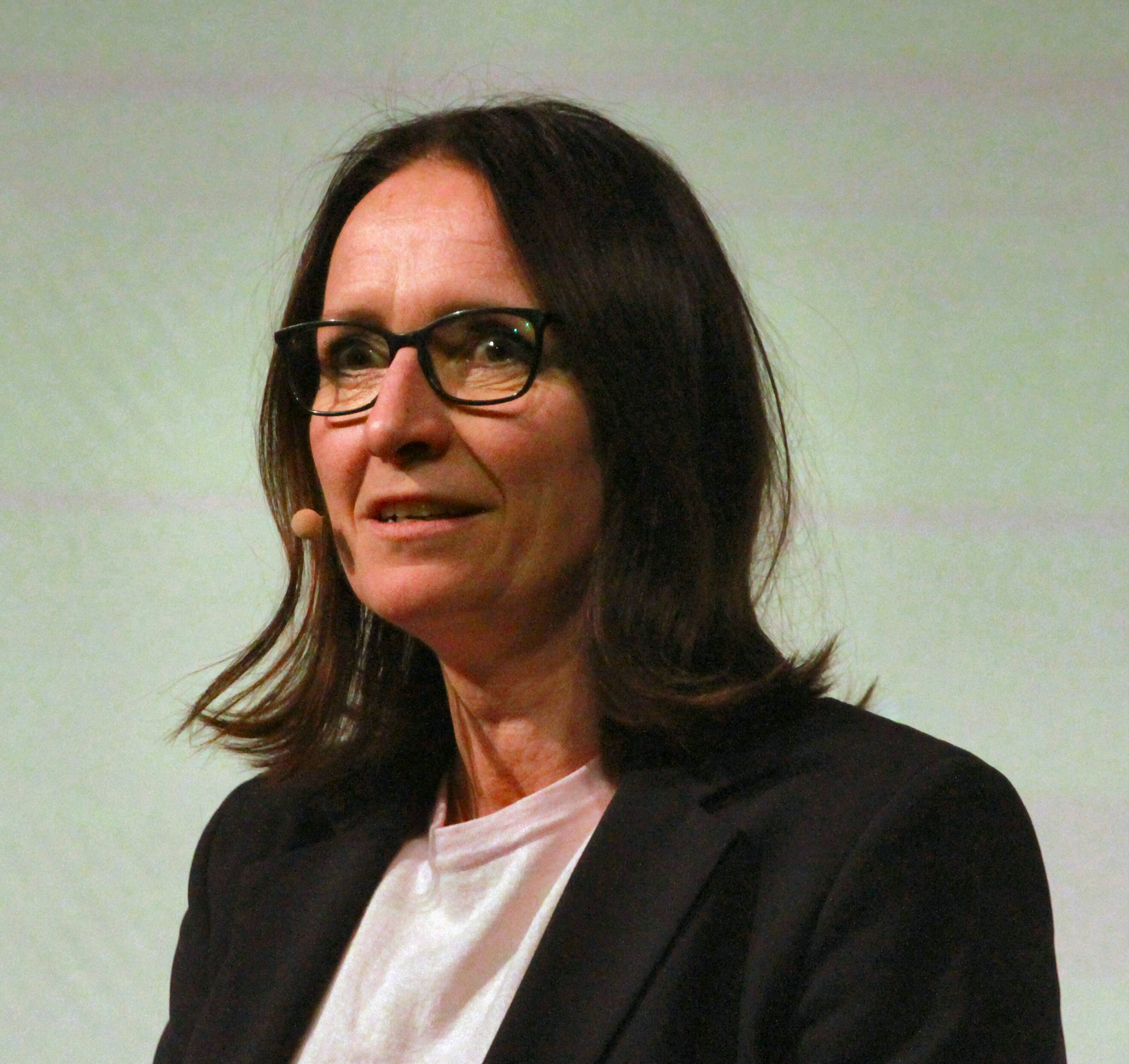

Personal information
- Nationality: Norway
- Born: 20 July 1974 (age 52)
- Spouse: Tor Arne Hetland (m. 2004)

Sport
- Sport: Skiing
- Club: IL Varden

World Cup career
- Seasons: 7 – (1995–2001)
- Indiv. starts: 45
- Indiv. podiums: 0
- Team starts: 13
- Team podiums: 0
- Overall titles: 0 – (40th in 1999)
- Discipline titles: 0

Guri Hetland, née Knotten (born 20 July 1974) is a retired Norwegian cross-country skier.

She competed at the 1994 Junior World Championships without making a mark. She made her World Cup debut in February 1995 in Oslo, placing lowly. She broke the top 30-barrier with a 24th place in December 1997 in Val di Fiemme. In December 1998 she experienced her best run, first breaking the top-20 barrier with a 19th place in Milan, then recording a 17th place three days later, and between 27–29 December two 10th places and an eighth place. Her career best was a December 1999 Engelberg sprint seventh place, and her last World Cup start came at the 2001 Holmenkollen ski festival.

She represented the sports club IL Varden. She is married to Tor Arne Hetland. They worked together as coaches for the Swiss national team.

== Cross-country skiing results ==
All results are sourced from the International Ski Federation (FIS).

=== World Cup ===
==== Season standings ====
| Season | Age | | | | |
| Season | Age | Overall | Long Distance | Middle Distance | Sprint |
|---|---|---|---|---|---|
| 1995 | 20 | NC | —N/a | —N/a | —N/a |
| 1996 | 21 | NC | —N/a | —N/a | —N/a |
| 1997 | 22 | NC | NC | —N/a | — |
| 1998 | 23 | 67 | NC | —N/a | 64 |
| 1999 | 24 | 40 | NC | —N/a | 20 |
| 2000 | 25 | 42 | 61 | NC | 28 |
| 2001 | 26 | 65 | —N/a | —N/a | 42 |
