= Hjalmar Andersen =

Norwegian speed skater

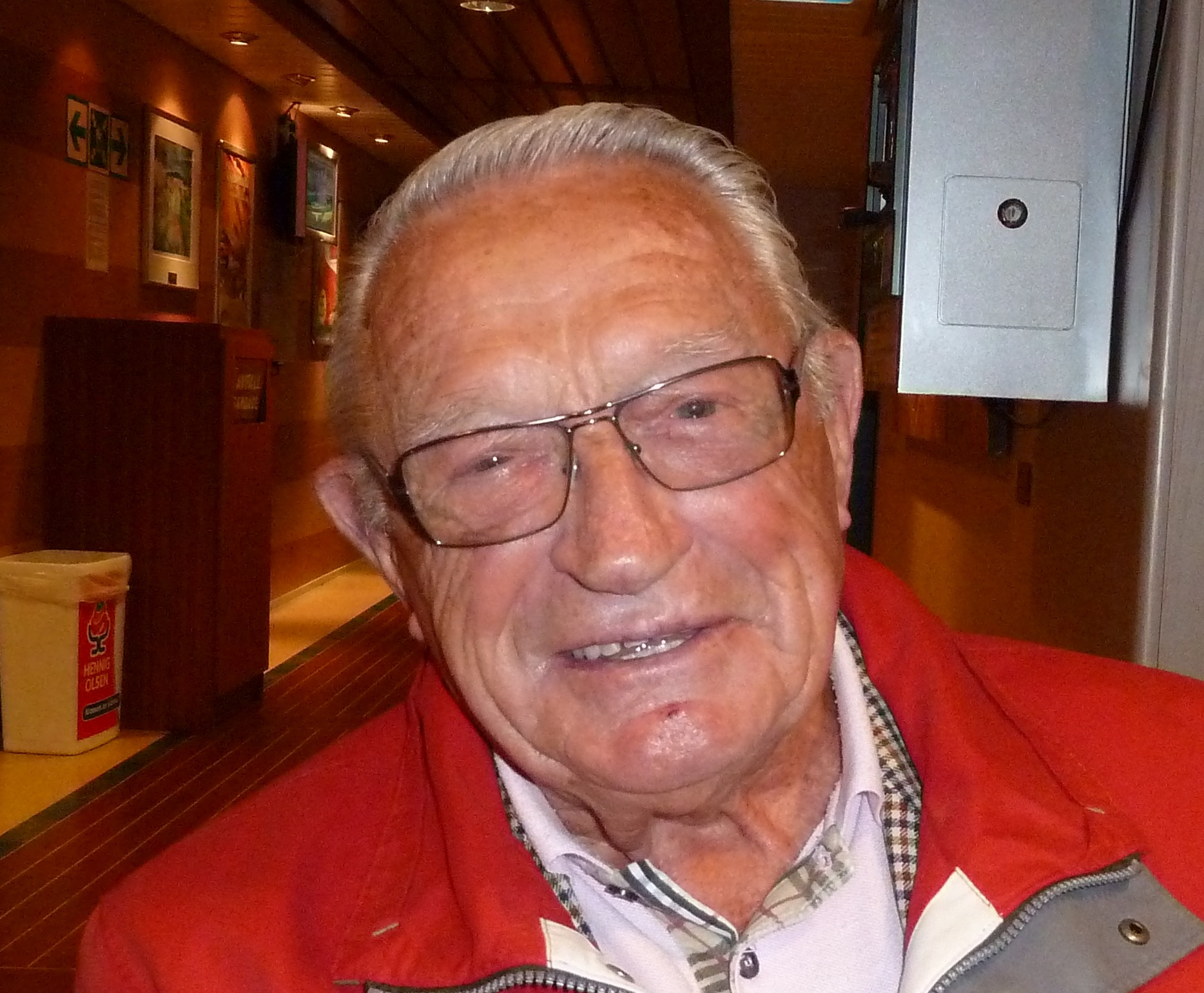
- Hjalmar Andersen onboard ferry Bastø II in October 2010

Personal information
- Nickname: Hjallis
- Born: Hjalmar Johan Andersen; 12 March 1923 Rødøy Municipality, Norway
- Died: 27 March 2013 (aged 90) Oslo, Norway

Sport
- Country: Norway
- Sport: Speed skating
- Club: Sportsklubben Falken

Achievements and titles
- Personal bests: 500 m: 43.7 (1951); 1000 m: 1:30.6 (1954); 1500 m: 2:16.4 (1949); 3000 m: 4:49.6 (1954); 5000 m: 8:06.5 (1956); 10 000 m: 16:32.6 (1952)
Medal record
Representing Norway
Olympic Games
Gold medal – first place	1952 Oslo	1,500 m
Gold medal – first place	1952 Oslo	5,000 m
Gold medal – first place	1952 Oslo	10,000 m
World Championships
Gold medal – first place	1950 Eskilstuna	Allround
Gold medal – first place	1951 Davos	Allround
Gold medal – first place	1952 Hamar	Allround
European Championships
Gold medal – first place	1950 Helsinki	Allround
Gold medal – first place	1951 Oslo	Allround
Gold medal – first place	1952 Östersund	Allround
Silver medal – second place	1949 Davos	Allround
Silver medal – second place	1954 Davos	Allround

Hjalmar "Hjallis" Johan Andersen (12 March 1923 – 27 March 2013) was a speed skater from Norway who won three gold medals at the 1952 Winter Olympic Games of Oslo, Norway. He was the only triple gold medalist at the 1952 Winter Olympics, and as such, became the most successful athlete there.

Nicknamed King Glad for his famous cheerful mood, he was one of Norway's most popular sportsmen ever. Four statues of him were raised during his lifetime; in Trondheim, Hamar, Rødøy and outside Bislett Stadium in Oslo. He was honored with a funeral at the state’s expense.

== Early life ==
Andersen was born on Rødøya, an island off the coast of Nordland in Norway, where his mother hailed from. His father, who originally was from Hammerfest, was a boatswain. While Andersen was still a toddler, the family moved to Lademoen, a working-class neighborhood in Trondheim, where sport and friendship was an important part of life.

He began speed skating at the age of 10, and became a member of the sports club Falken. The club was part of the Workers' Sports Federation (AIF), and the first competitions he participated in were small, local competitions organized by the AIF. Other members of the club were Sverre Farstad and Henry Wahl; later Andersen, Farstad and Wahl would be known by the nickname The Falken Trio.

After the German occupation of Norway in 1940, when Andersen was 17 years old, all organized sports competitions were halted as a result of the sports boycott against the Nazi regime. Like others of his generation, he had to wait until the winter of 1946 to take up his sports career again.

Professionally, he began working as a delivery boy in a sports store after having completed the folkeskole at about 14. He later worked as a lorry driver for several years. In 1950, when he was at the height of his speed skating career, he opened his own sports store in Trondheim, which he ran until 1960.

== Career ==
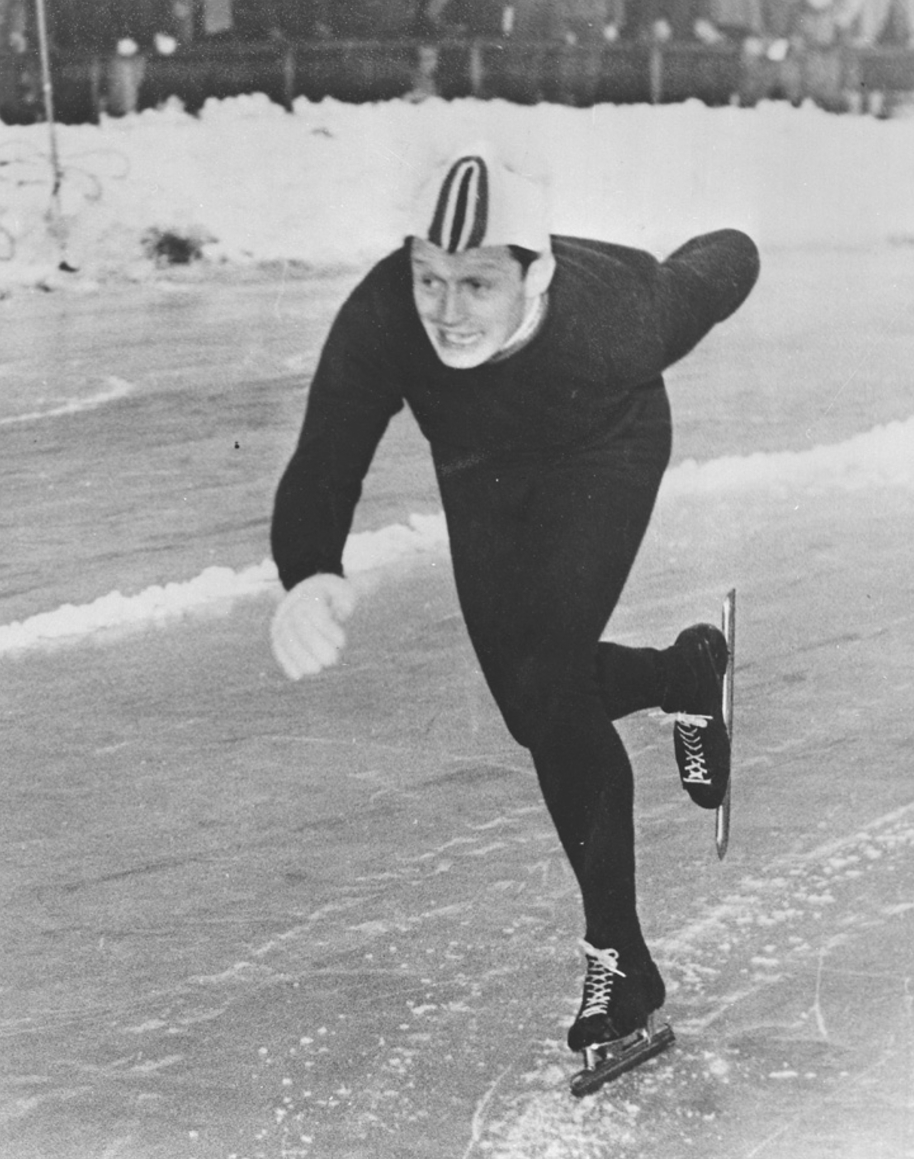
Hjalmar Andersen, ca. 1950

He made his international debut at the 1948 Winter Olympic Games of St. Moritz, Switzerland, winning the qualifying race for 1500 m, but he was still not selected for the Norwegian team for this distance. He was selected for the 10000 m team, but because of the terrible ice conditions he did not finish the race.

During the European Championship in Davos he recorded a personal best of 2:16.4 at 1,500 m and set a new world record in the 10,000 m with 16:57.4. He placed second overall in the championship.

Andersen was the best skater of the world from 1950 to 1952. In each of those three years, he became World Allround Champion, making him one of only five male skaters to have won this title in three consecutive years – the other four being Oscar Mathisen (1912–1914), Ard Schenk (1970–1972), Eric Heiden (1977–1979), and Sven Kramer (2007–2010). In those same years, 1950–1952, he was also European Allround Champion and Norwegian Allround Champion, thus winning the "triple" (World, European, and National Allround Championships) for three consecutive years. He also set three world records in those three years.

A notable event in his career was the European Championship in 1951 at Bislett Stadium. Speed skating was immensely popular in Norway at the time and 25,000 people cheered the skaters during the two-day event. King Haakon VII was present at the event.

During the event, Andersen won the three first distances and was a clear favourite to become allround champion before the 10,000 metres. After 11 laps, however, Andersen fell. He tried to continue on, but one of his skates had been damaged and he was taken off the rink. Andersen’s fall was soon linked to a flash used by photographer Johan Brun from Dagbladet at the moment of the fall. It was decided to let Andersen run the 10,000 metres for a second time, while a jury was to consider whether the second run should actually count. In the meantime, Brun rushed to Dagbladet to get his film developed. He returned with the photo he had taken when the fall happened. It showed that Andersen had his eyes shut at the time. The jury concluded that the flash had blinded Andersen.

The result from his second 10,000 metres run became official and he won both the 10,000 metres and the overall championship. Brun and Andersen had friendly contact later in life. Brun has stated that the electronic flash he had used couldn't possibly have blinded Andersen, and he believes the jury made a mistake due to lack of knowledge of photography equipment.

In a speed skating international between Norway and the rest of the world at Hamar on 10 February 1952, Hjalmar Andersen set a world record in the 10,000 meters with the time 16:32.6. It was the first time a speed skater took less than 40 seconds to complete every lap in the 10,000 meters, and it was regarded as an amazing world record. In Norway, the record achieved legendary status, and is often referred to as the best known sports record ever. The record stood for eight years, until Kjell Bäckman broke it.

The record created enormous interest in Andersen in the 1952 Winter Olympics that started in Oslo one week later. On 17 February, Andersen won his first Olympic gold medal in the 5,000 meters with a new Olympic record. The next day, he won gold in the 1,500 meters, and he ended the competition by setting a new Olympic record in winning the 10,000 meters on 19 February. The three days of skating competitions were attended by 75,000 enthusiastic spectators.

Andersen quit skating after the 1952 Olympics, but he was talked into giving it another try in 1954. He became Norwegian champion for the fourth time and won both the 5,000 m and 10000 m at the European Championships in Davos, Switzerland that year, winning silver in the overall standings. He qualified for the 1956 Olympics and earned sixth place on the 10,000 m.

During his career, he set four world records. His 10,000 m world record in 1949 (16:57.4) was the first official world record below 17 minutes for the distance. As it was skated outside of Norway, it did not count as a Norwegian national record, of which Andersen set eight during his skating career. Andersen represented Sportsklubben Falken (Sports Club Falcon) in Trondheim.

== Later years ==
After he ended his skating career, Andersen moved to Tønsberg. In addition to his skating triumphs, Andersen was also a great cyclist on a national level, and he was awarded the Egebergs Ærespris in 1951 for his achievements in speed skating and cycling.

He started a long career in "the welfare service for merchant shipping", which he worked with until he reached retirement age in 1990.

Earning the nickname "Kong Glad" (English: "King Happy") and known for his sense of humour, he was a popular speaker. He also published several books, partly memories from his sports career and partly humoristic stories.

He received the King's Medal of Merit in gold in 1998 and The Honor Prize at Idrettsgallaen together with Knut Johannesen in 2013, just two months before his death.

== Personal life ==
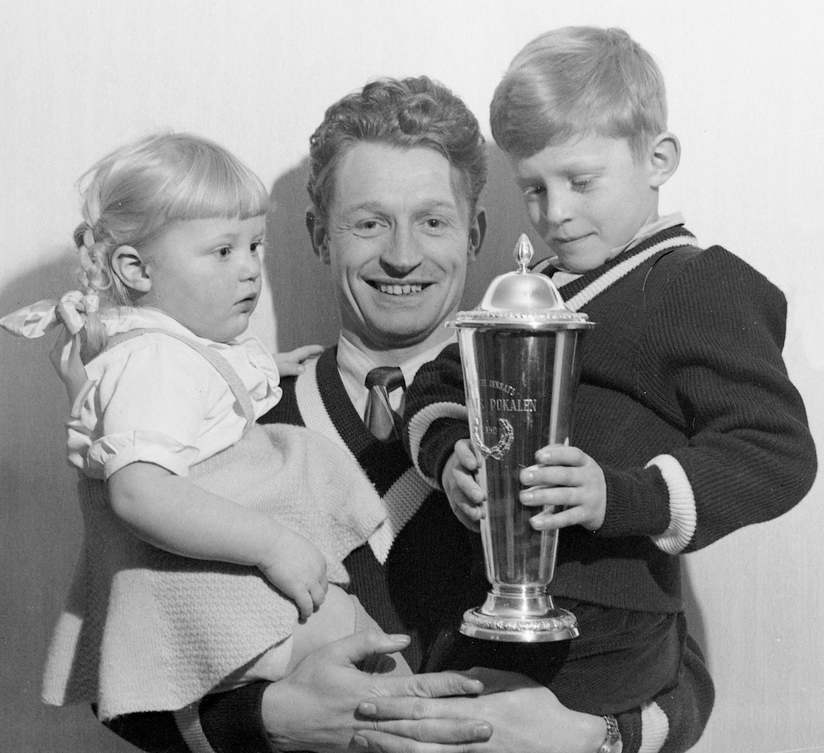
Andersen with children in 1952

Andersen married his teenage sweetheart, Gerd, and they lived together until she died in 2004. They had three children.

== Death and funeral ==
On 25 March 2013, Andersen suffered a serious fall in his home in Tønsberg, Norway, was rushed to the hospital and never regained consciousness. He died two days later on 27 March, two weeks after his 90th birthday. His survivors include three children and grandson Fredrik van der Horst, a speed skater who represented Norway at the 2010 Winter Olympics in Vancouver, British Columbia.

The Norwegian government decided that Hjalmar Andersen should be honored with a funeral at the state’s expense. He was the third athlete to be given this honor since 1998.

Prime minister Jens Stoltenberg stated that “Hjalmar Andersen became a sport legend at a time when speed skating was part of the Norwegian identity, and got involved in the work for sailors at time when ship transport was interwoven with the nation’s soul. In this way, "Hjallis contributed to forming post-war Norway in an important way and won a huge place in the hearts of several generations of Norwegians.”

The funeral ceremony in Tønsberg Cathedral on 4 April 2013 was attended by King Harald V and by Norway's Prime minister Jens Stoltenberg who gave a speech.

== Medals and Records ==
An overview of medals won by Andersen at important championships he participated in, listing the years in which he won each:

Championships	Gold medal	Silver medal	Bronze medal
Winter Olympics	1952 (1500 m); 1952 (5000 m); 1952 (10000 m)	–	–
World Allround	1950; 1951; 1952	–	–
European Allround	1950; 1951; 1952	1949; 1954	–
Norwegian Allround	1950; 1951; 1952; 1954	–	1949; 1956

Over the course of his career, Andersen skated four world records:

Discipline	Time	Date	Location
10,000 m	16.57,4	6 February 1949	(Switzerland) Davos
5000 m	8.07,3	13 January 1951	(Norway) Trondheim
10,000 m	16.51,4	27 January 1952	(Norway) Gjøvik
10,000 m	16.32,6	10 February 1952	(Norway) Hamar

Source: SpeedSkatingStats.com

Norwegian records

Event	Result	Date	Venue
Big combination	193.940	29 January 1950	Trondheim
Big combination	192.708	12 February 1950	Oslo
5000 m	8:13.8	4 March 1950	Gjøvik
5000 m	8:07.3	13 January 1951	Trondheim
Big combination	190.707	14 January 1951	Trondheim
10000 m	17:00.1	20 January 1952	Oslo
10000 m	16:51.4	27 January 1952	Gjøvik
10000 m	16:32.6	10 February 1952	Hamar

Note that in the days Hjalmar skated a Norwegian record could only be skated in Norway itself, so his Davos world record could not become a Norwegian record as well.

Personal records

To put these personal records in perspective, the WR column lists the official world records on the dates that Andersen skated his personal records.

Event	Result	Date	Venue	WR
500 m	43.7	13 January 1951	Trondheim-Stadion	41.8
1000 m	1:30.6	2 February 1954	Davos	1:28.4
1500 m	2:16.4	6 February 1949	Davos	2:13.8
3000 m	4:49.6	30 January 1954	Davos	4:40.2
5000 m	8:06.5	29 January 1956	Lagua Misurina	7:45.6
10000 m	16:32.6	10 February 1952	Hamar-Stadion	16:51.4

== Ranking as speed skater ==
Andersen had a final Adelskalender score of 187.446 points. He held first place on the Adelskalender for 708 days between 1952 and 1954.

First as of	500m	1500m	5000m	10000m	Total points	Bumped by
24 January 1952	42,2	2.17,4	8.03,7	17.08,8	187,810	Nikolay Mamonov
10 February 1952	43,7	2.16,4	8.07,3	16.32,6	187,526	
18 January 1954	42,2	2.17,4	8.03,7	16.52,2	186,980	Nikolay Mamonov

== Awards ==
- Morgenbladets gold medal, 1949
- Egebergs Ærespris, 1951
- Fearnleys olympiske ærespris, 1952
- Norwegian Sportsperson of the Year, 1952
- Olavstatuetten (awarded by Adresseavisen), 1976
- King's Medal of Merit in gold, 1998
- The Honor Prize at Idrettsgallaen, 2013

== Books ==
- Hjalmar Andersen: Harde løp (1951). Self-published.
- Hjalmar Andersen:Siste runde (1952). Norsk idrettsforlag.
- Hjalmar Andersen and Sverre E. Mortensen: Hva idretten ga meg (1983). Gyldendal Norsk Forlag. ISBN 9788205147720
- Hjalmar Andersen and Sverre E. Mortensen: Medaljens bakside (1985). Gyldendal Norsk Forlag. ISBN 9788205153578
- Hjalmar Andersen: Den gode, gamle, gale istida (1989). Det Norske Samlaget. ISBN 9788252134438
- Hjalmar Andersen and Knut-Anders Løken: Gull og glis (1990) Det Norske Samlaget. ISBN 9788252136425

== Notes ==
=== Bibliography ===
- Eng, Trond. All Time International Championships, Complete results 1889 – 2002. Askim, Norway: WSSSA Skøytenytt, 2002.
- Eng, Trond and Teigen, Magne. Norske Mesterskap på Skøyter, 1894 – 2005. Askim/Veggli, Norway: WSSSA-Norge, 2005.
- Eng, Trond; Gjerde, Arild; Teigen, Magne and Petersen, Preben Gorud. Norsk Skøytestatistikk Gjennom Tidene 1999. Askim/Skedsmokorset/Veggli, Norway: WSSSA-Norge, 1999.
- Teigen, Magne. Komplette Resultater Norske Mesterskap på Skøyter, 1887 – 1989. Veggli, Norway: WSSSA-Norge, 1989.

Awards and achievements
Preceded by Egil Lærum	Egebergs Ærespris; 1951	Succeeded by Hallgeir Brenden
Preceded by Stein Eriksen	Norwegian Sportsperson of the Year; 1952	Succeeded by Sverre Strandli
