= Reidar Jørgensen =

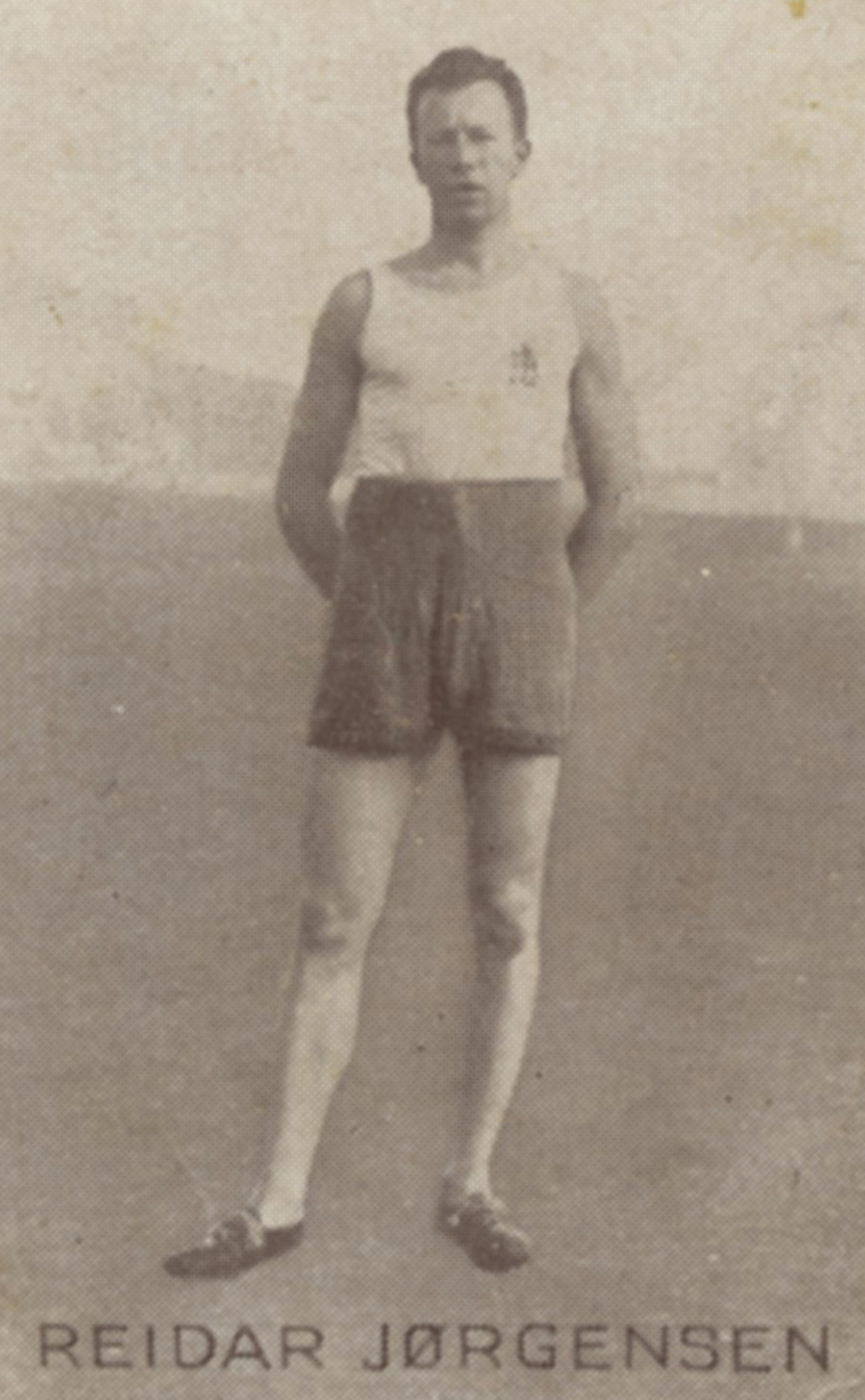
- Reidar Jørgensen ca. 1930
- Born: 5 October 1904; Lillehammer, Norway
- Died: 22 September 1985 (aged 80)
- Occupations: botanist and educator
- Known for: middle distance runner, cross-country skier
- Relatives: Simen Agdestein (grandson)
- Awards: Egebergs Ærespris

Reidar Jørgensen (5 October 1904 – 22 September 1985) was a Norwegian middle-distance runner, cross-country skier, botanist and educator.

== Sports career ==
He was born in Lillehammer. He competed in the 1500 metres at the 1928 Summer Olympics in Amsterdam, where he was knocked out in the first round. He was Norwegian champion several times in 800 metres, 1500 metres and 5000 metres. He took the 800 metres title in 1927 before Hjalmar Johannessen's dominance in the event started; and also the bronze medal in 1928 behind Johannessen and Olaf Strand. In the 1500 he won three straight titles in 1927, 1928 and 1929. A 5000 gold, his only national medal in the event, was added in 1931. He represented Lillehammer IF. After that he moved to Trondheim, changed clubs to SK Freidig and took a final national title in the 1500 metres in 1933. He also won the elite class with Lillehammer IF in the road relay Holmenkollstafetten's 1929 edition.

Jørgensen's personal best times were 3:56.5 in the 1500 metres (1933), 8:39.4 in the 3000 metres (1929) and 15:07.8 in the 5000 metres (1930). He was the first Norwegian to run below 4 minutes in the 1500 metres in 1929, with 3:56.6, and in total he set four Norwegian records in the event. He also set one record in the 3000 metres.

Jørgensen was also an adept skier for the clubs Lillehammer SK and Trondhjems SK. For his achievement in both athletics and skiing, he was awarded Egebergs Ærespris in 1929. He also chaired SK Freidig and Trondhjems TF. He chaired the Trondheim branch of the Norwegian Trekking Association, and became an honorary member of the organization in 1957. During the Second World War he participated in the Norwegian resistance movement, and was later active in Norges Forsvarsforening.

== Scientific career ==
In his scientific career, Jørgensen specialized in alpine botany. He took the cand.real. degree at the Royal Frederick University in 1932, and his master's thesis on vascular plants in the mountain chain Jotunheimen was issued as the book Karplantenes høidegrenser i Jotunheimen. He worked as a teacher from 1932 to 1945 and principal from 1945 to 1974 at Gerhard Schøning Upper Secondary School, formerly called Trondhjems borgerlige realskole. He also wrote Die Höhengrenzen der Gefässpflanzen in Troms fylke about similar plants in high areas of Troms in 1936, and wrote about the alpine flora Fjellflora in 1952 together with Olav Gjærevoll.

Jørgensen died in September 1985 in Trondheim. His maternal grandson Simen Agdestein became a successful football and chess player.

Awards
Preceded by Bernt Evensen	Egebergs Ærespris; 1929 (together with Armand Carlsen)	Succeeded by Fritjof Bergheim (1931)
