= Ferdinand Julian Egeberg =

Norwegian military officer, chamberlain and timber merchant (1842-1921)

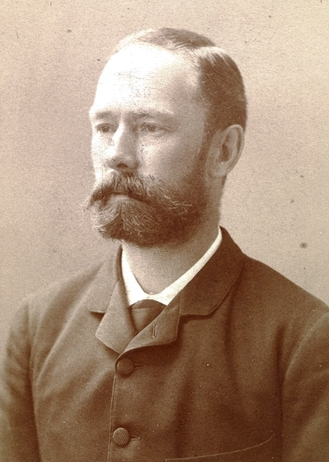
- Egeberg (back right) with family members
- Born: 23 November 1842; Moss in Smaalenenes
- Died: 12 September 1921 (aged 78)

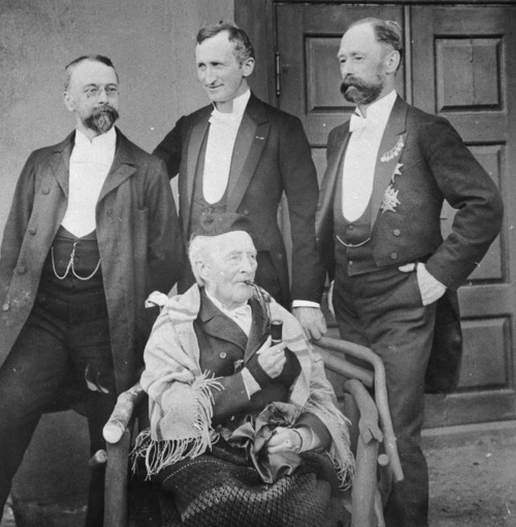
Egeberg (back right) with family members

Ferdinand Julian Egeberg (23 November 1842 - 12 September 1921) was a Norwegian military officer, chamberlain and timber merchant. He is remembered for having founded the sports prize Egebergs Ærespris, which was regarded as the highest achievement in Norwegian sport.

== Personal life ==
Egeberg was born in Moss in Smaalenenes county, Norway. He was the son of merchant Peder Cappelen Egeberg and Hanna Wilhelmine Scheel. He was a brother of Einar Westye Egeberg, Sr. and a grandson of Westye Egeberg.

He married Lucy Parr in 1876. Their son Westye Parr Egeberg was a notable landowner. Through their daughter Esther Lucy Egeberg he was grandfather of painter and writer Ferdinand Finne. He died in Tolga in 1921, aged 78.

== Career ==
Egeberg was a naval officer from 1863, and served in the British Royal Navy from 1865. He was first lieutenant à la suite from 1874, and discharged in 1875. Together with his brother Einar, he took over his family's Christiania-based timber company Westye Egeberg & Co in 1874, after the death of their father. He was an associate from 1879. He served as Cabinet Chamberlain (Swedish: kabinettskammarherre) for Oscar II of Sweden from 1887 to 1905.

Egeberg was decorated as a Knight, First Class of the Royal Norwegian Order of St. Olav in 1891. He was a Commander, First Class of the Danish Order of the Dannebrog, Knight Grand Officer of the Order of the Crown of Italy, Officer of the French Légion d'honneur, Commander of the Spanish Order of Charles III, Knight Grand Officer of the Spanish Order of Isabella the Catholic and the Swedish Order of the Polar Star, and recipient of King Oscar II's Anniversary Medal.

== Egebergs Ærespris ==
Upon his 75th birthday in 1917, Egeberg donated 10,000 kr to the sports association Norges Riksforbund for Idræt. The donation was basis for the sports prize Kabinetskammerherre Egebergs ærespris for alsidig idrett. According to the original statutes approved in 1920, the fund's interests should be used for a statuette given to a sportsperson who, during the last two years, had excelled in one sport and also showed eminent performances in another, completely different sport. Egeberg also funded a design competition for the trophy, won by sculptor Magnus Vigrestad. The statuette became regarded as the highest achievement in Norwegian sport at the time. The first prize was awarded for 1918.

The statutes have changed slightly over the years. Today the prize is awarded by the Norwegian Olympic and Paralympic Committee and Confederation of Sports, and given to Norwegian sports people who have excelled nationally in at least two sports, and excelled internationally in at least one of these.
