= Ekberg =

Ekberg is a Swedish surname. Notable people with the surname include:

- Anita Ekberg, Swedish model and actress
- Filip Ekberg (born 2007), Swedish ice hockey player
- Fredrik Ekberg, (1825–1891), Finnish pastry chef
- Oskar Ekberg (born 1977), Swedish pianist
- Ragnar Ekberg, (1886–1966), Swedish track and field athlete
- Stefan Ekberg, Swedish motorcycle speedway rider
- Sten Ekberg, Swedish track and field athlete
- Ulf Ekberg, Swedish singer, songwriter and producer

== See also ==
- Café Ekberg
