= Martin Stokken =

Norwegian cross-country skier

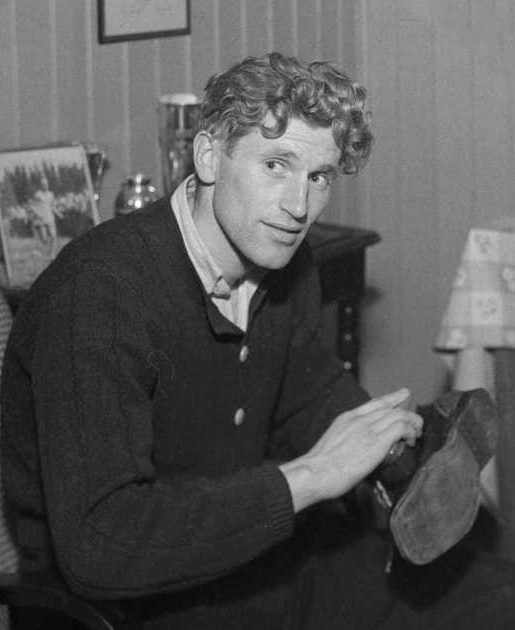
- Stokken in 1948

Personal information
- Born: 16 January 1923 Snegldal, Snillfjord Municipality, Norway
- Died: 25 March 1984 (aged 61) Trondheim Municipality, Norway

Sport
- Sport: Athletics, cross-country skiing
- Event(s): Athletics: steeplechase, 5000 m, 10,000 m Skiing: 10–50 km
- Club: Selsbakk IF

Achievements and titles
- Personal best(s): Athl: 3000 mS – 9.13.0 (1950); 5000 m – 14:13.8 (1955); 10,000 m – 29:54.0 (1952)
Medal record
Men's cross-country skiing
Representing Norway
Olympic Games
Silver medal – second place	1952 Oslo	4 × 10 km relay
World Championships
Bronze medal – third place	1950 Lake Placid	4 × 10 km relay

Martin Stokken (16 January 1923 – 25 March 1984) was a Norwegian cross-country skier who competed at the 1948 and 1952 Summer and 1952 and 1956 Winter Olympics. At the Summer Olympics he ran 5000 m and 10,000 m, finishing fourth in the latter event in 1948. At the Winter Games he won a silver medal in the 4 × 10 km relay in 1952, placing fourth in 1956. His best individual result was six place in the 18 km in 1952 and in 15 km in 1956. At the world skiing championships Stokken won a bronze medal in the 4 × 10 km relay event in 1950 and placed fourth over 50 km in 1954. In 1954 he also won the 50 km race at the Holmenkollen ski festival and won the Holmenkollen medal. Earlier in 1949 he was awarded the Egebergs Ærespris.

Stokken was born as the youngest of four siblings on a desolate farm. In 1934 the farm burned down and his father died soon after that. In his teens Stokken worked as a shepherd, and earned enough money to buy a pair of decent skis for his training. In 1939 he and his mother moved to Fåvang, where he joined the local ski club. During World War II, in 1943, he fled to Sweden and joined the Norwegian resistance movement. He returned to Norway in 1945, and in 1946 won the national title and placed eighth in 10,000 m running at the 1946 European Championships. From then on and until 1951 he was the best Norwegian 5000 m and 10,000 m runner. He also excelled in the 3000 m steeplechase, placing fourth at the 1950 European Championships. He retired from athletics in 1955, after setting his personal best over 5000 m, and having won 19 national titles over his athletic career.

In the late 1940s Stokken trained in cross-country skiing merely to stay fit in winters, but since 1951 he began competing and was included into the national team. Besides his international achievements in skiing, between 1951 and 1957 he won five national titles. He retired in 1960 after winning the Birkebeiner race from Rena to Lillehammer. In retirement he continued working as police officer in Trondheim Municipality (he held that position from 1950 to 1980) and eventually became a skiing and biathlon coach.

== Cross-country skiing results ==
All results are sourced from the International Ski Federation (FIS).

=== Olympic Games ===
- 1 medal – (1 silver)

Year	Age	15 km	18 km	30 km	50 km	4 × 10 km relay
1952	29	—N/a	6	—N/a	—	Silver
1956	33	6	—N/a	15	DSQ	4

=== World Championships ===
- 1 medal – (1 bronze)

Year	Age	15 km	18 km	30 km	50 km	4 × 10 km relay
1950	27	—N/a	17	—N/a	17	Bronze
1954	31	13	—N/a	11	11	4
1958	35	—	—N/a	21	21	4

Awards
Preceded by Sverre Farstad	Egebergs Ærespris; 1949	Succeeded by Egil Lærum
Preceded by Petter Hugsted	Norwegian Sportsperson of the Year; 1949	Succeeded by Sverre Strandli
