= Selsbakk IF =

Norwegian sports club

- Full name: Selsbakk Idrettsforening
- Founded: 25 January 1911
- Ground: Trondheim stadion Trondheim

Selsbakk Idrettsforening is a Norwegian sports club from Trondheim, Sør-Trøndelag. It has sections for team handball, gymnastics, track and field and Nordic skiing.

It was founded on 15 May 1945 as a merger of Forsøket SL, Selsbakk TF and the Workers' Confederation of Sports club SK Fram. In 1953 it had no gymnastics section, but since then it has lost sections for association football and swimming. One of these clubs was founded on 25 January 1911, which the club now counts as its founding date.

The club has had success in athletics, with Martin Stokken representing the club. High jumper Tonje Angelsen has also represented the club.

The ski jumping hill Granåsen originally belonged to the club.
