= Magnus Vigrestad =

Norwegian sculptor

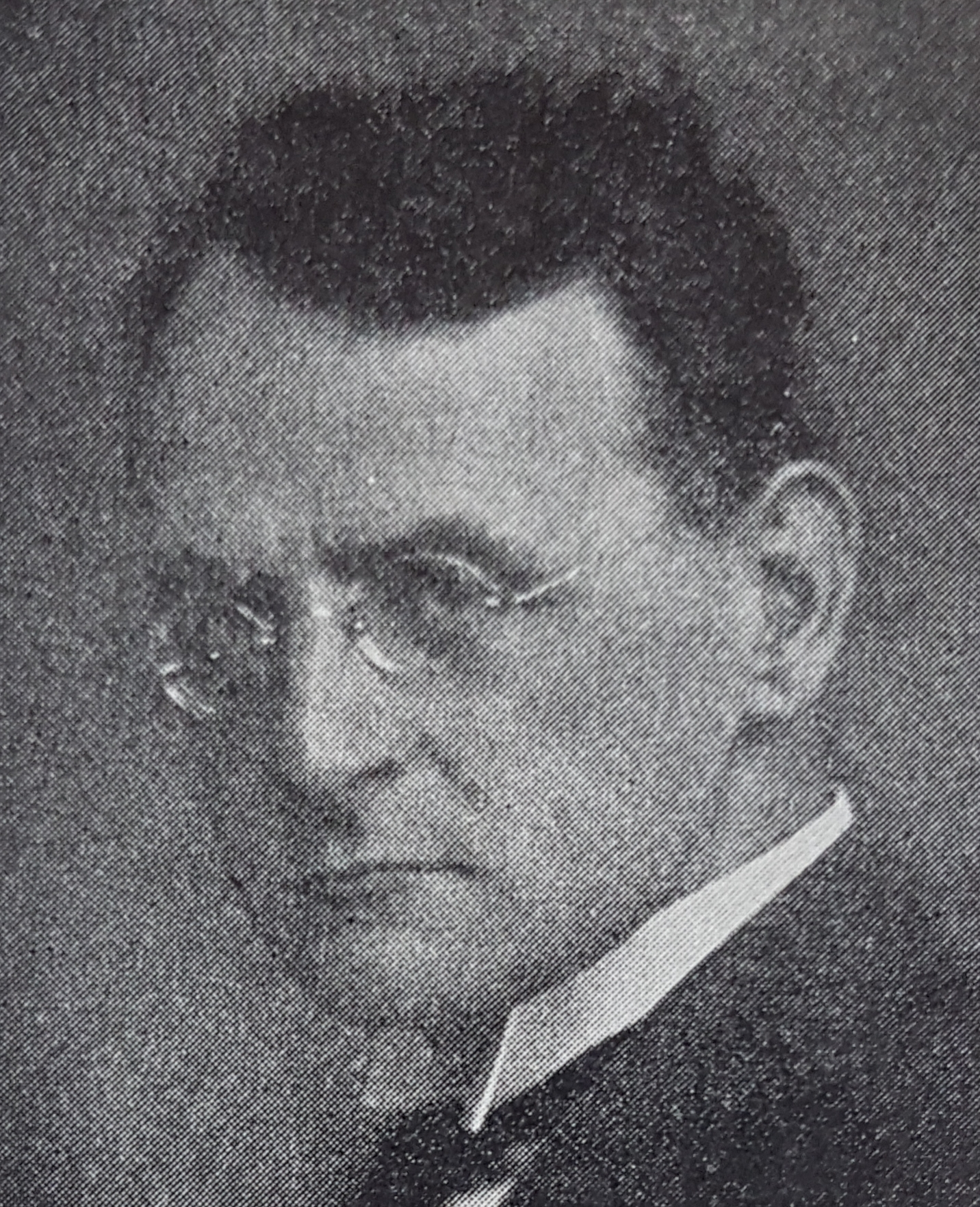
Magnus Vigrestad, was a Norwegian sculptor

Magnus Vigrestad (12 August 1887 – 1 December 1957) was a Norwegian sculptor. Among his works is a sculpture of the novelist Alexander Kielland from 1927. He is represented in the National Gallery of Norway. He has also modeled the bronze statuette for the sports prize Egebergs Ærespris.
