= IL Varden Meråker =

Norwegian sports club

IL Varden Meråker Fotball
Home colours

Logo.

Idrettslaget Varden Meråker is a multi-sports club from Meråker Municipality, Norway.

Established in 1910, it has sections for skiing, football and handball.

Well-known club members include cross-country skiers Magnar Lundemo, Tor Arne Hetland, and Marthe Kristoffersen.
