= Eggberg =

Mountain in Germany

Coordinates: 47°35′N 7°57′E

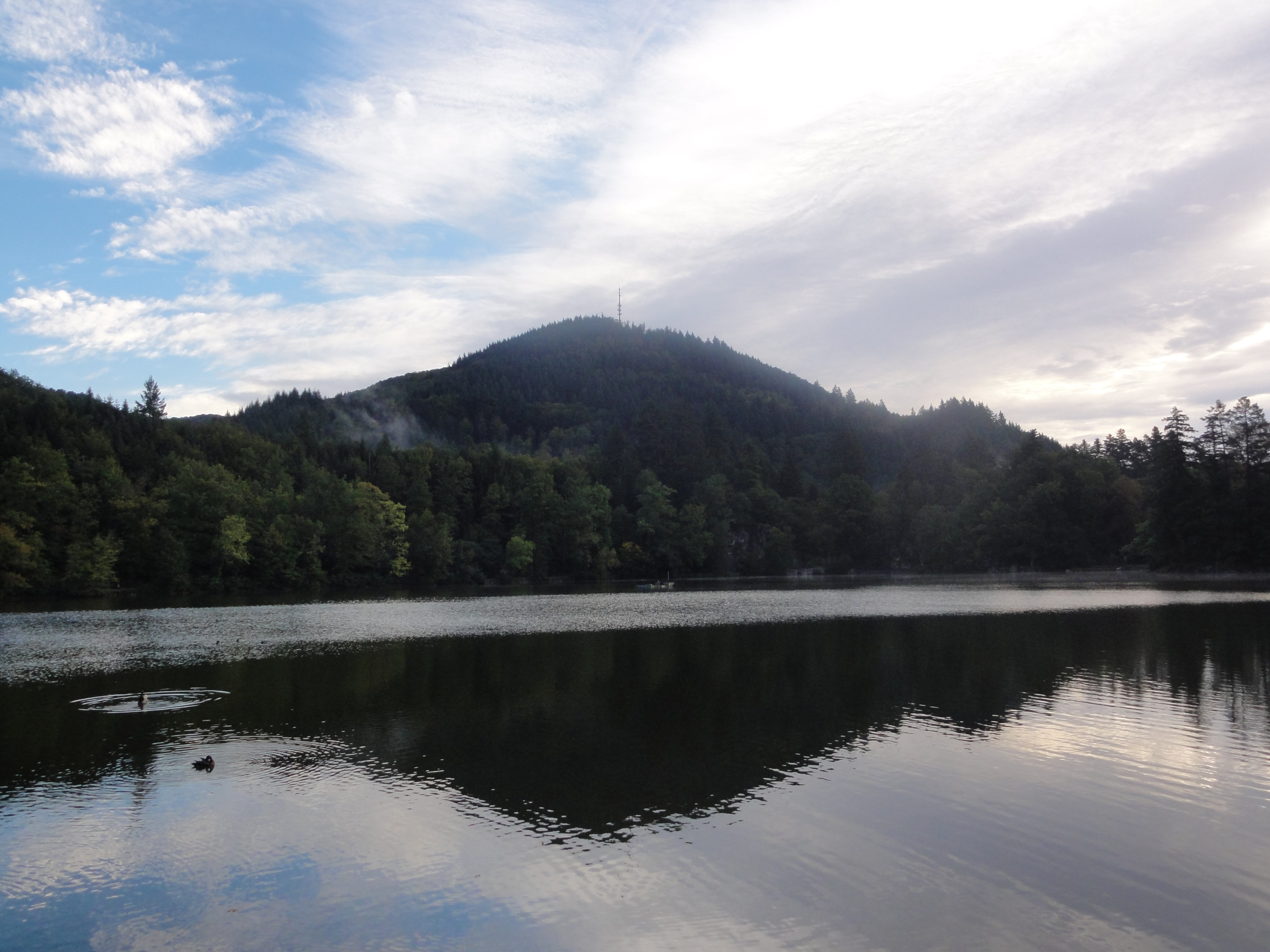

Highest point
- Elevation: 709 m (2,326 ft)

Geography
- Location: Bad Säckingen, Baden-Württemberg, Germany
- Parent range: Black Forest (Schwarzwald)

Eggberg is a mountain of Baden-Württemberg, Germany.
