= Oskar Ekberg =

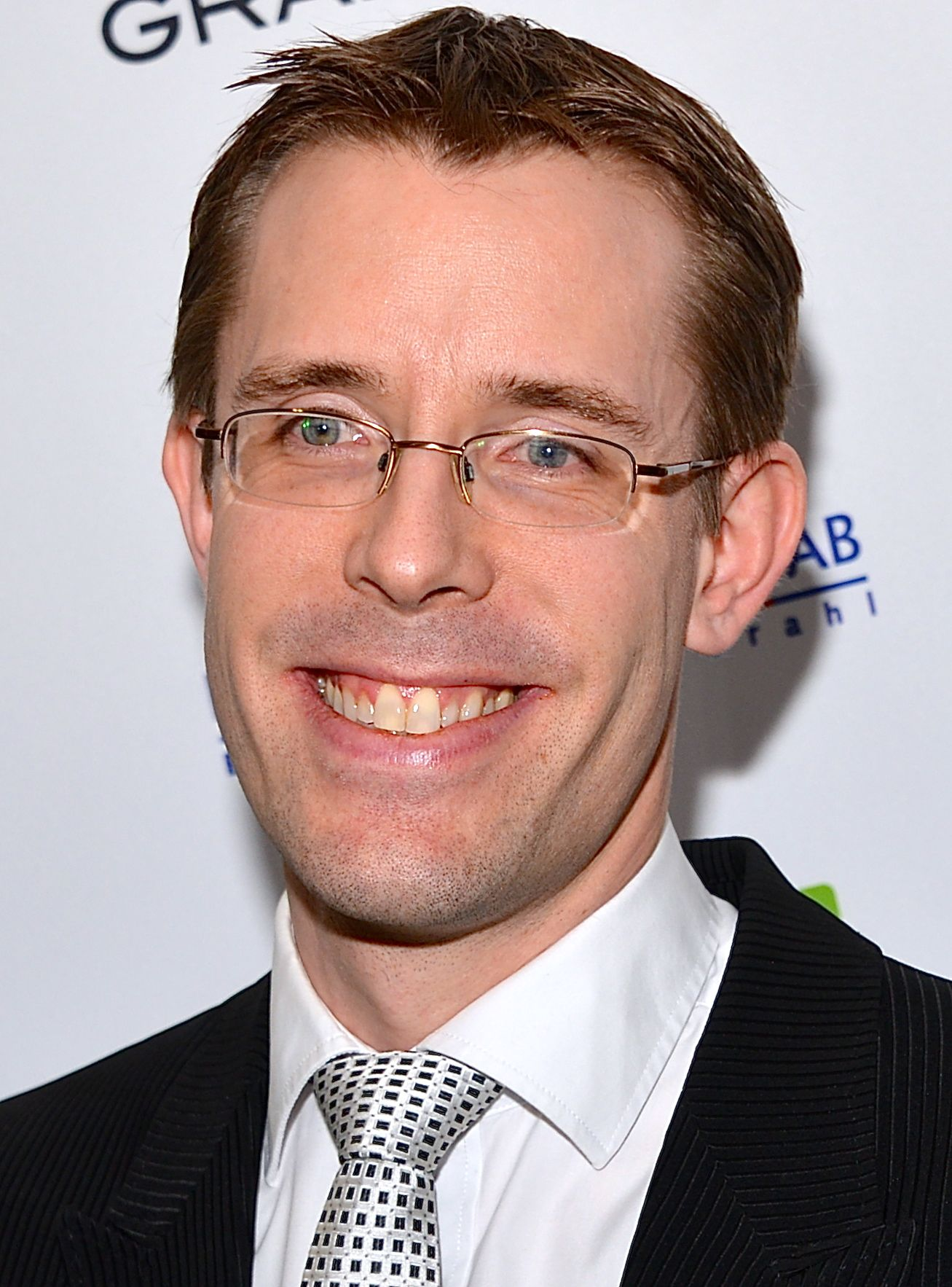
- Oskar Ekberg

Background information
- Born: 19 February 1977 (age 49); Södertälje, Sweden
- Genres: Classical
- Occupations: Pianist, professor
- Instrument: Piano
- Label: Daphne Records
- Website: www.oskarekberg.com

Oskar Ekberg (born 19 February 1977, in Södertälje) is a Swedish pianist basically active as a performer at the Swedish concert scene. He has shown particular interest in Olivier Messiaen's and Johan Helmich Roman's music, the latter recorded on Daphne Records. He has also recently recorded the complete piano music of Elfrida Andrée. Oskar Ekberg is also working as an orchestra pianist in the major orchestras of Sweden. Ekberg teaches at Ersta Sköndal University College.
