= Nikolay Mamonov =

Nikolay Mamonov is a former Soviet speedskater.

He set a world record in 5,000 m in Medeo in 1952, with a time of 8:03.7.

== World records ==
Discipline	Time	Date	Location
5000 m	8.03,7	23 January 1952	(Soviet Union) Medeo

Source: SpeedSkatingStats.com
