= Winter duathlon =

Sporting event

Winter Duathlon is an athletic event that consists of a running leg, followed by a cross-country skiing leg, and then another running leg in a format similar to Winter triathlon. In 2007 various people including Channel Multisport were trying to grow the sport and encourage more people to participate in the hope that Winter Triathlon will be included in the 2010 Winter Olympics.

According to the authors of SwimBikeRunFun, a "Duathlon is a multisport event for athletes of all abilities. It’s similar to triathlon in that there are three legs of the event. Unlike triathlon, there are only two disciplines are involved. While triathlon is a swim-bike-run event, a duathlon is a run-bike-run event."

What is needed for a Winter Duathlon? "Layering is essential – a merino base layer will help you enormously across a range of conditions. A windproof jacket will help reduce wind chill, and some tight-fitting ones exist to minimise wind drag on the bike. If it is due to be wet, keeping dry will help you to stay warm. A good quality, waterproof, windproof layer will be worth it. Again, they can be close fitting to minimise drag. An alternative approach is to wear a short-sleeved top and arm warmers, enabling you to adjust levels easily as you warm up and cool down."

Another use of the duathlon is in cross-country skiing where skiers have a mass start using the classical technique and ski a specific distance (men - 15 km, women - 7.5 km), then change their skis, poles, and boots in a pit stop manner similar to a triathlon, then ski at the same specific distance (men - 15 km, women - 7.5 km) in the freestyle (skating) technique. The winner of the event is the competitor who crosses the finish line first. It was first introduced at the FIS Nordic World Ski Championships 2003 in Val di Fiemme as a 10 km + 10 km event for men, 5 km + 5 km event for women. The distances for the double pursuit were lengthened to their current length at the following world championships in Oberstdorf. This is referred to as a double pursuit.

Author Tom Epton in his article in The Draft titled, "Winter Triathlon – A prospective Olympic sport" says, " I think that World Triathlon have a shot at a successful application to the IOC. It’s fair to say the run, mountain bike and ski combination make for a good watch and would be fun to take part in. Winter triathlon satisfies most of the requirements for an Olympic sport but perhaps mass participation needs to increase."
