= Egeberg Castle =

Building in Oslo, Norway

Coordinates: 59.9217°N 10.7474°E

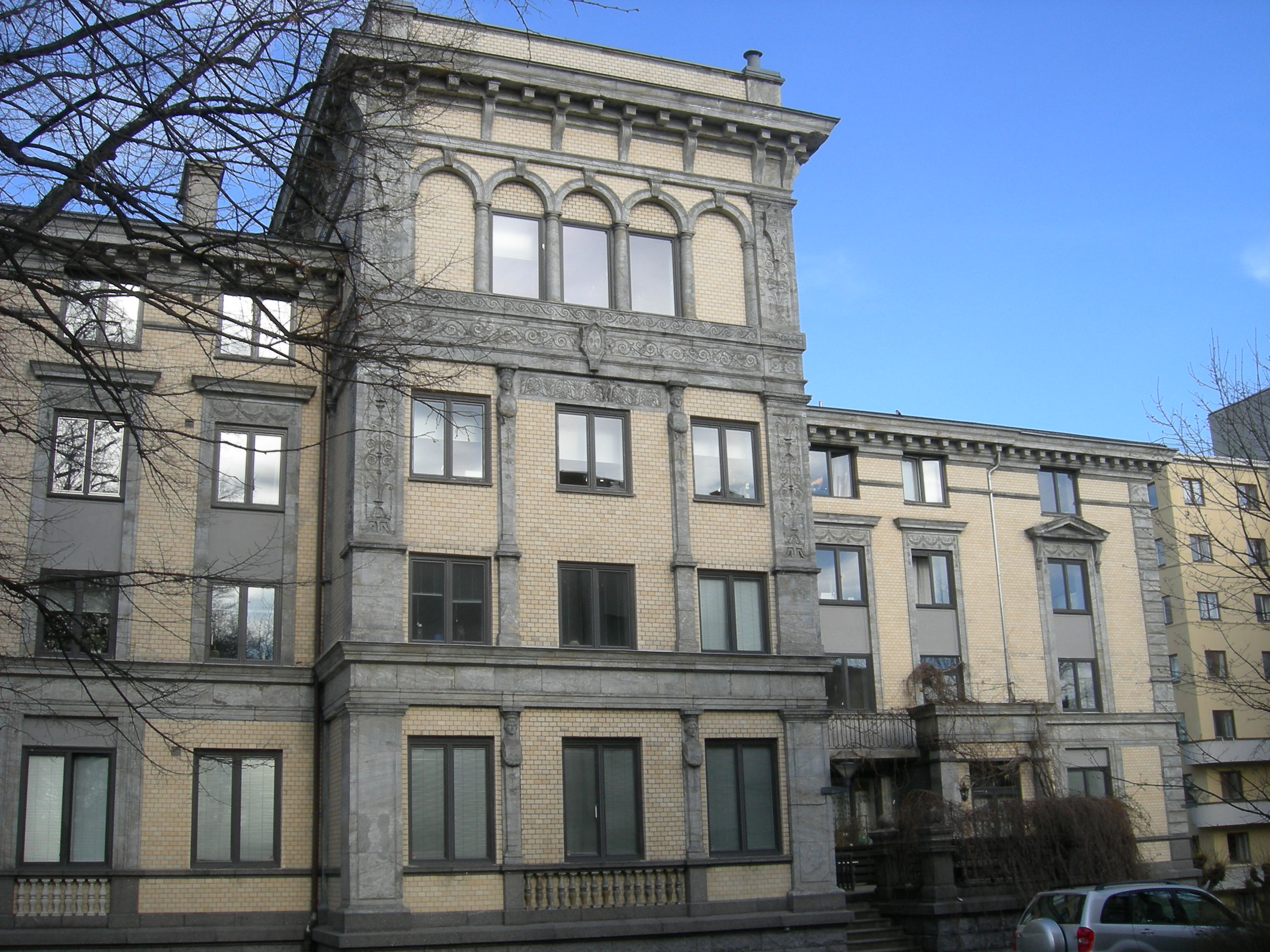
Egeberg in Hanshaugen

Egeberg Castle (Norwegian: Egebergslottet) a building in St. Hanshaugen in Oslo, Norway. Egeberg was once Oslo's biggest private residence at 1600 square metres over two floors and a tower section. At the turn of the century, the mansion stood tall surrounded by a big park and with a splendid view over the city and harbour.

== Einar Westye Egeberg ==
Egeberg was constructed in 1899-1901 on the basis of designs by leading architect Halfdan Berle (1861- 1929). The mansion was constructed on behalf of Einar Westye Egeberg (1851-1940) and his wife Birgitte Halvordine (1857-1930). Einar Westye Egeberg co-owned one of Oslo's most important lumber companies, Westye Egeberg & Co . The Egeberg couple had seven children of which most had reached adulthood when the family moved into the a mansion in 1901.

== Construction ==
The total construction cost was 12 million kr in 1901. The construction was done using quality materials such as granite and soapstone. The architectural style was Italian Renaissance dominated by noble forms. The interior ceilings were made by Italian stucco workers. The first floor contained hall, vestibule, smoking lounge, dining room, kitchen, loggia, garden room and cabinet. In the second floor, there were bed rooms, dressing rooms and bath room. The tower held the billiard room whereas storage rooms were found in the basement. Mrs. Egeberg suffered from a weak health and was partially paralyzed. Therefore, a lift was installed at a cost of NOK 25,000. A car—an open Minerva similar to that of the Norwegian royal family—was acquired in 1912 for Mrs. Egeberg to be able go on a daily drive with the chauffeur. She died in 1930.

== Later years ==
After his wife's death, Einar Egeberg did not want to live alone in the big residence, and thus wanted to sell it, which proved difficult during the 1930s economic depression. In the end, Egeberg was sold to Bolig-Bygg AS. Another two floors were added within the original building construction: one additional floor was created by splitting the second floor into two separate floors. The fourth floor came from converting the original loft surrounding the billiard room into living area. Thus, Egeberg changed from a private residence to an apartment building with 24 apartments.
