= Arne Bakker =

Norwegian footballer and bandy player (1930-2009)

Personal information
- Full name: Arne Bakker
- Date of birth: 18 February 1930
- Place of birth: Bærum, Norway
- Date of death: 9 October 2009 (aged 79)
- Place of death: Bærum, Norway

Youth career
- –1946: Fossum IF
- 1946–1949: Stabæk IF

Senior career*
Years	Team	Apps	(Gls)
1949–	Asker SK		

International career
1953–1962	Norway	54	(0)

Managerial career
- 1962–1963: Asker SK
- Stabæk IF
Medal record
Men's bandy
Representing Norway
Olympic Games (demonstration sport)
Silver medal – second place	1952 Oslo	Team
- * Club domestic league appearances and goals

Arne Bakker (18 February 1930 – 9 October 2009) was a Norwegian footballer and bandy player.

== Football career ==
He was born in Bærum. He started his career in Fossum IF, joined Stabæk IF in 1946 and Asker SK in 1949. Here he played at the highest level of Norwegian football. His team became runner-up in the Norwegian Football Cup of 1951. He played 54 matches for national football team of Norway.

== Other sports ==
Bakker represented Stabæk IF in the bandy sport. The team became Norwegian champions in 1952, 1953 and 1955, and Bakker represented Norway 20 times. In 1952 he took part in the Olympic Bandy tournament. He also played ice hockey for Stabæk IF and Jar IL, and also practiced ski jumping and track and field. In 1961 he received Egeberg's Honorary Award for achievement in multiple sports. He is the only combined footballer/bandy player to date to receive the award. In 1997, he became an honorary member of Stabæk.

== Later career ==
Bakker coached Asker's football team in 1962 and 1963, and later Stabæk. His professional life was spent working for Norsk Hydro. He died in Bærum in October 2009, having lived at Jar his whole life.
