= Westye Egeberg =

Norwegian businessman (1770–1830)

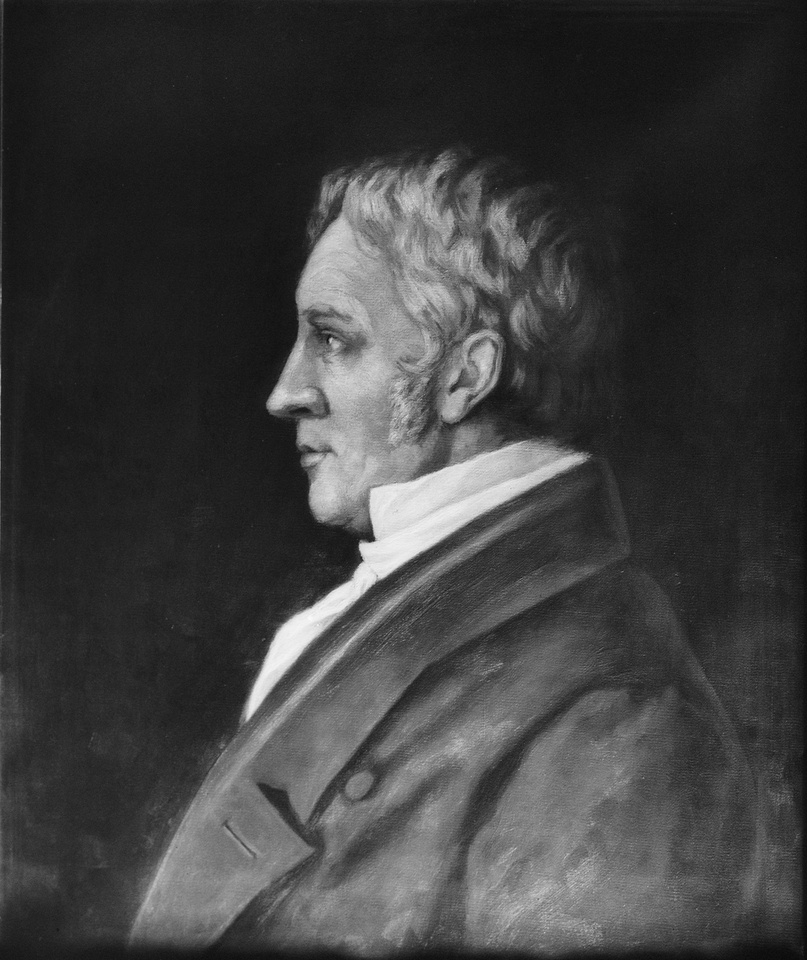
- Born: 16 August 1770; Lysabild, Als, Denmark
- Died: 27 February 1830 (aged 59)
- Occupation: Businessman
- Spouse: Anna Sophie Muus (m. 1802)
- Children: 9, including Fredrikke Egeberg

Westye Egeberg (16 August 1770 – 27 February 1830) was a Danish-born Norwegian businessman who founded Westye Egeberg & Co., a Norwegian timber company that existed from 1800 to 1929.

== Early life and family ==
Westye Egeberg was born on 16 August 1770 in Lysabild on the island of Als in Denmark to parish priest Martin Egeberg and (1718–1780) and Fredrikke Hahnefeldt (died 1784). He was their eighth and youngest child and only son. When Egeberg was 10, his father died, followed by his mother four years later, leaving him an orphan at the age of 14. A year later, he travelled to Copenhagen, before relocating to Norway the following year in 1786.

On 16 March 1802, Egeberg married Anna Sophie Muus (1775–1862) in Christiania (now Oslo), and together they had nine children, including Westye Martinus Egeberg (1805–1898), physician Christian Egeberg (1809–1874) and composer Fredrikke Egeberg (1815–1861).

== Career ==
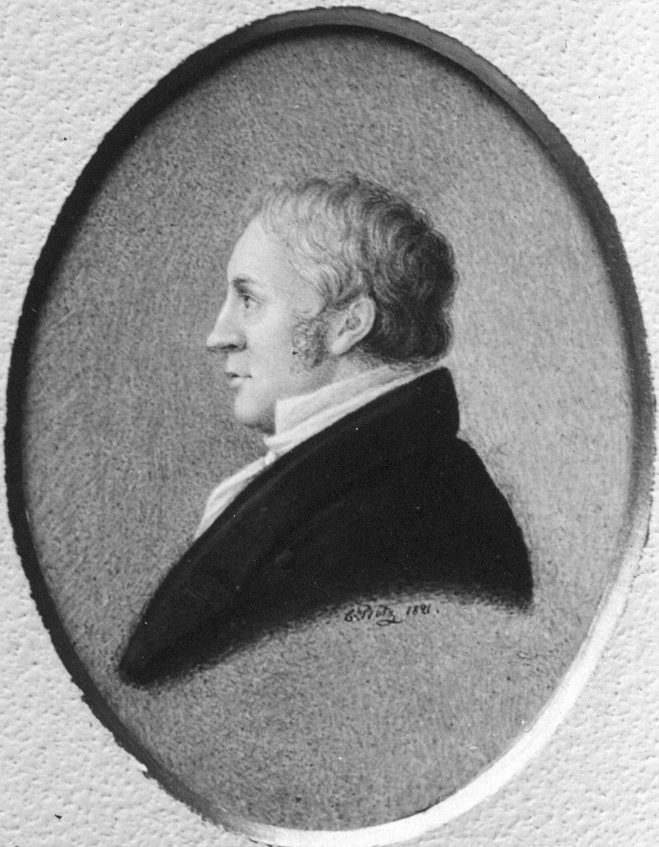
Westye Egeberg drawn by Carl Ludvig von Plötz

In 1800, he founded the company Westye Egeberg & Co in Christiania as a commission and agency business. However in 1811, he purchased a third of the Gansbruket timber lands in Fet near Lake Øyeren in Akershus, which formed the basis for the Westye Egeberg & Co trading in lumber company. Thirteen years later in 1824, Egeberg bought another third of the Gansbruket timber lands from Carsten Tank. He controlled the company until his death in 1830.

== Death and legacy ==
Westye Egeberg died on 27 February 1830 in Christiania, at the age of 59. After Egeberg's death, his son Westye Martinus Egeberg managed the firm from 1830 to 1851. His brothers Peder Cappelen Egeberg (1810–1874) and Christian August Egeberg (1809–1874) became co-owners and took control of the company in 1851. In 1874, management of the company was passed down to Ferdinand Julian Egeberg (1842–1921) and Einar Westye Egeberg (1851–1940).
