= Ferdinand Finne =

Norwegian author, painter, graphic artist, theater decorator and costume designer

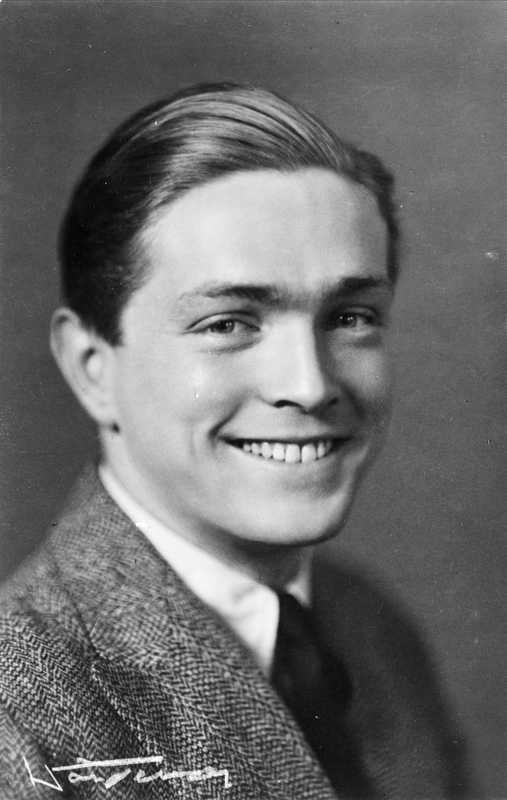
- Born: 12 October 1910; Kristiania, Norway
- Died: 31 December 1999 (aged 89); Oslo, Norway
- Occupations: Author, painter

Ferdinand Oscar Finne (12 October 1910 – 31 December 1999) was a Norwegian author, painter, graphic artist, theater decorator and costume designer.

== Biography ==
He was the son of Esther Lucy Egeberg (1887–1962) and Severin Finne (1883–1953). His father was a lawyer, and his mother was the daughter of Norwegian merchant Ferdinand Julian Egeberg. Finne was the brother of the architect Hans-Gabriel Finne (1916–2012). His parents divorced while he was still a child, and his mother moved with her children to Great Britain.

He was costume designer at Nationaltheatret from 1935 to 1938. At the outbreak of World War II in 1940, Finne was in London where he reported for duty at the Norwegian embassy. Finne started his career as an artist under the direction of the Austrian expressionistic painter Oskar Kokoschka (1886–1980) in London. He subsequently studied at the National Art Academy in Oslo with Norwegian artists Per Krogh and Jean Heiberg. After a stay in Paris, with Fernand Léger, he had his artist debut in 1954. He wrote on art in various newspapers and magazines, and published a number of books. In 1990, Finne had a very successful solo exhibition at the Henie Onstad Kunstsenter.

He was decorated Knight, First Class of the Royal Norwegian Order of St. Olav in 1991. From around 1960 he lived for 25 years on the Spanish island of Ibiza. Ferdinand Finne died at Oslo in 1999. He is represented in the National Gallery of Norway with several art works.

== Private life ==
Finne was for a short time in a relationship with the Austrian émigré actor Anton Walbrook, whom he had met in 1938 on a train ride in France. The relationship ended in 1946 after Walbrook began an affair with the Englishman Eugene Edwards.

== Selected writings ==
- Store motekonger, 1939
- Øya og huset, 1956
- Den grønne lagune. En pastorale, 1967
- Såvidt jeg husker, 1974
- En krans av greske øyer, 1977
- Veien blir til mens du går, 1985
- Så vidt jeg husker – og litt til, 1986
- Vandrer mot en annen strand. En reise mellom øyer, en bok om tro og kunst, 1990
- Ringer i et hav. En krans av greske øyer, 1991
- Sangen om Sørlandet. Historien om en øy og et hus, 1993
- Blå elefant – ekko fra India, 1998
