= Ekeberg (surname) =

Ekeberg is a surname. Notable people with the surname include:

- Anders Gustaf Ekeberg (1767–1813), Swedish chemist
- Arne Ekeberg (born 1925), Norwegian judge
- Birger Ekeberg (1880–1968), Swedish jurist
- Carl Gustaf Ekeberg (1716–1784), Swedish physician, chemist and explorer
- Herman Ekeberg (born 1972), Norwegian football player
