= Fredrikke Egeberg =

Norwegian pianist and composer (1815–1861)

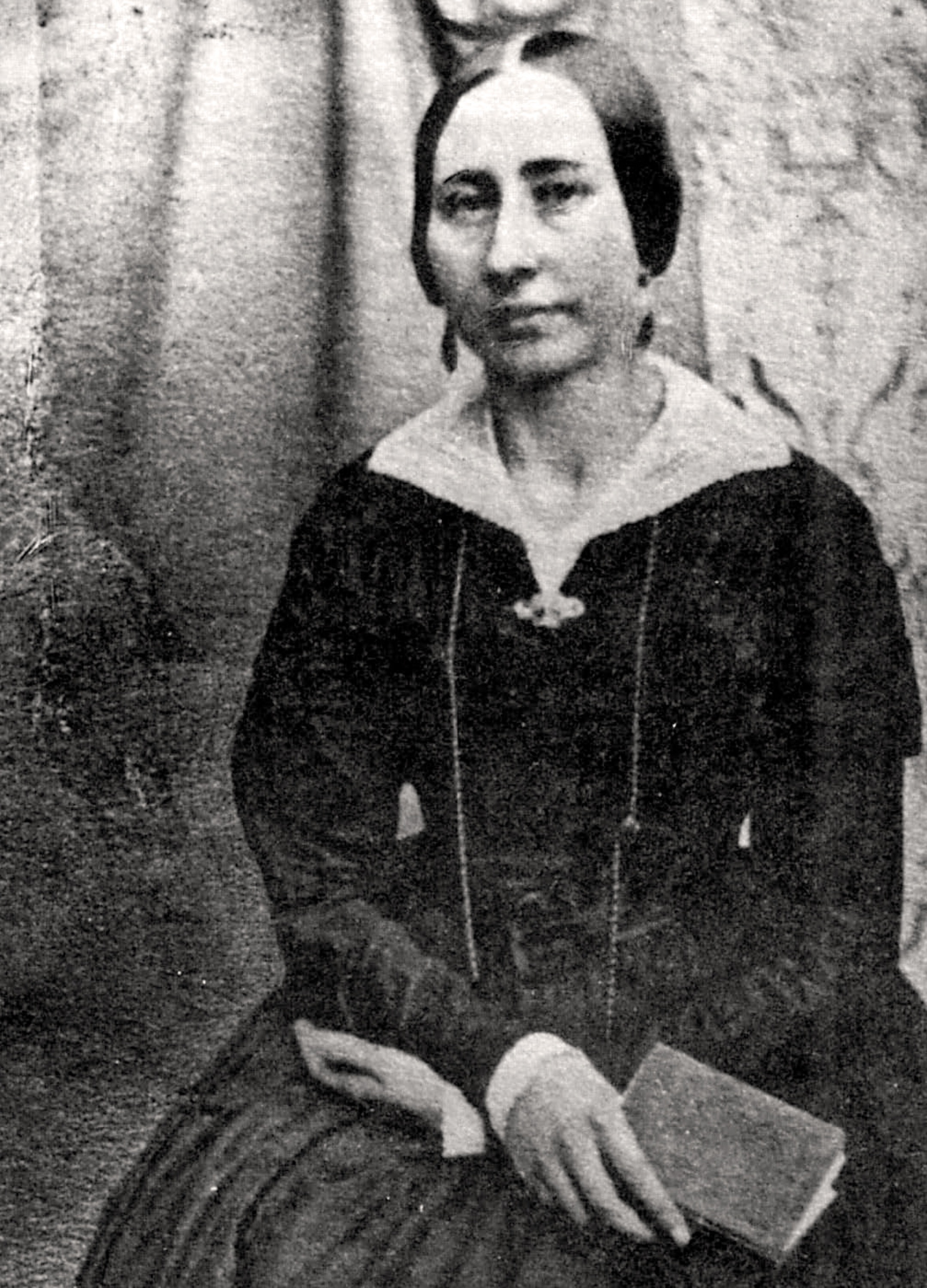
- Born: Annichen Fredrikke Sophie Egeberg; 23 November 1815; Christiania, Norway
- Died: 16 May 1861 (aged 45); Sem, Norway
- Occupations: Pianist, composer
- Father: Westye Egeberg

Annichen Fredrikke Sophie Egeberg (23 November 1815 – 16 May 1861) was a Norwegian pianist and composer.

== Early life and family ==
Annichen Fredrikke Sophie Egeberg was born in Christiania on 23 November 1815 to Westye Egeberg (1770–1830), a Danish immigrant and businessman, and Anna Sophie Muus (1775–1862). Her family became wealthy through her father's lumber company. Egeberg was the youngest of nine children and their only daughter. She was the sister of Westye Martinus Egeberg and physician Christian Egeberg, and an aunt of Ferdinand Julian Egeberg, Einar Westye Egeberg, Sr. and Theodor Christian Egeberg. Violinist Ole Bull was a friend of the family and often played at the family chamber music concerts. Egeberg's brother, Christian, became an accomplished amateur cellist. Her two nieces, Anna Egeberg and Fredrikke Lindboe, also became composers of songs and piano pieces.

== Career ==
Egeberg became an accomplished pianist, playing piano at Old Aker Church near the family property of Løkken, as well as performing piano concertos with the Musical Lyceum orchestra. During the late 1840s, Egeberg became very productive as a composer and was heavily inspired by religious texts and hymns written by N. F. S. Grundtvig, Thomas Kingo and Magnus Brostrup Landstad. She also often set Norwegian poetry to music, including one of her most famous works "Til min Gyldenlak", which set Henrik Wergeland's poem of the same name to music.

== Later life and death ==
She never married. During the last few years of her life, Egeberg lived on the Berg farm in Sem in Vestfold, where she died on 16 May 1861, at the age of 45. She was buried at Cemetery of Our Saviour in Christiania. Per her wishes, a large portion of her family inheritance went to Ole Bull's two surviving children.

== Works ==
Selected works include:

- 4 Kirkesange, 1850
- Norske Sange, ca. 1850
- Sex Sange uden Ord for klaver, ca. 1850
- Arioso og Springdans, 1851
- 3 Sange af Arne (text: B. Bjørnson), 1876 (posthumous)
- Buesnoren; Fjeldplanten; Til min Gyldenlak: 3 norske Sange
- Digte af Henrik Wergeland
