= 1959 U.S. Figure Skating Championships =

Figure skating competition

- Type: National Championship
- Date: January 29 – February 1
- Season: 1958–59
- Location: Rochester, New York
- Host: Genesee FSC and Rochester Junior Chamber of Commerce
- Venue: Rochester Community War Memorial

Champions
- Men's singles: David Jenkins (Senior); Gregory Kelley (Junior)
- Women's singles: Carol Heiss (Senior); Laurence Owen (Junior)
- Pairs: Nancy Ludington and Ron Ludington (Senior); Judianne Fotheringill and Jerry Fotheringill (Junior)
- Ice dance: Andree Jacoby and Donald Jacoby (Senior); Marilyn Meeker and Larry Pierce (Junior)
- Previous: 1958 U.S. Championships
- Next: 1960 U.S. Championships

The 1959 U.S. Figure Skating Championships was held from January 29 through February 1 at the Rochester Community War Memorial in Rochester, New York. Medals were awarded in three colors: gold (first), silver (second), and bronze (third) in four disciplines – men's singles, ladies' singles, pair skating, and ice dancing – across three levels: senior, junior, and novice.

The event determined the U.S. team for the 1959 World Championships.

== Senior results ==
In all four divisions, the previous year's champions successfully defended their titles.

=== Men ===
Rank	Name
1	David Jenkins
2	Tim Brown
3	Robert Brewer
4	Bradley Lord
5	Barlow Nelson
6	James Short
7	Lorin Caccamise

=== Ladies ===
Rank	Name
1	Carol Heiss
2	Nancy Heiss
3	Barbara Ann Roles
4	Lynn Finnegan

=== Pairs ===
Rank	Name
1	Nancy Ludington / Ron Ludington
2	Gayle Freed / Karl Freed
3	Maribel Owen / Dudley Richards
4	Ila Ray Hadley / Ray Hadley, Jr.
5	Sheila Wells / Tom Moore
6	Mary Lou Raymond / Jack Nankervis

=== Ice dancing (Gold dance) ===
Rank	Name
1	Andree Jacoby / Donald Jacoby
2	Margie Ackles / Charles Phillips
3	Judy Ann Lamar / Ronald Ludington
4	Susan Sebo / Tim Brown

== Junior results ==
=== Men ===
Rank	Name
1	Gregory Kelley
2	Don Mike Anthony
3	Frank Carroll
4	Douglas Ramsay
5	Bruce Heiss
6	James Murray
7	Harvey Balch
8	Robert James
WD	Tommy DeBaca

=== Ladies ===
Rank	Name
1	Laurence Owen
2	Stephanie Westerfeld
3	Rhode Lee Michelson
4	Dorothyann Nelson
5	Vicky Fisher
6	Diana Lapp
7	Karen Howland
8	Rickie Anne Rendich
9	Carol Galloway
10	Mary Cooper

=== Pairs ===
Rank	Name
1	Judianne Fotheringill / Jerry Fotheringill
2	Gail Kizer / Lonnie Kane
3	Laurie Hickox / William Hickox
4	Vivian Joseph / Ronald Joseph
5	Janet Harley / James Browning
6	Linda Charbonneau / Peter Betts
7	Jeanne Gladding / Richard Kavanaugh

=== Ice dancing (Silver dance) ===
Rank	Name
1	Marilyn Meeker / Larry Pierce
2	Diane Sherbloom / Roger Campbell
3	Patricia Dineen / Robert Dineen
4	Gloria Grossman / Peter Moesel
5	Jean Robinson / Richard Wayland
6	Thomasine Pierce / Roy Speeg
7	Paula Maniago / D. Wilson Hess
8	Elizabeth Herman / Charles Rizzo
9*	Beverly McGee / Arthur Dammkoehler
10*	Rosemary McEvoy / Ralph Owen

* Eliminated before Final Round
