= 1961 U.S. Figure Skating Championships =

Figure skating competition

- Type: National Championship
- Date: January 25 – 29
- Season: 1960–61
- Location: Colorado Springs, Colorado
- Previous: 1960 U.S. Championships
- Next: 1962 U.S. Championships

The 1961 U.S. Figure Skating Championships was held at the World Arena in Colorado Springs, Colorado, from January 25 to 29, 1961. Medals were awarded in three colors: gold (first), silver (second), and bronze (third) in four disciplines – men's singles, ladies' singles, pair skating, and ice dancing – across three levels: senior, junior, and novice.

The event determined the U.S. team for the 1961 World Championships.

The competition was dedicated to the memory of Howard D. Herbert, president of the United States Figure Skating Association, who had died suddenly just a few days before the competition opened.

The event is noted especially for its catastrophic aftermath, in which most of the U.S. team died in the crash of Sabena Flight 548 on their way to the World Championships in Prague. Because many of the top American figure skaters (including Carol Heiss and David Jenkins) had retired from the sport after the 1960 Winter Olympics, new champions were crowned in all four disciplines.

A notable feature of this event is that it was the first time the United States Figure Skating Championships were covered on national television, with a modest rights fee being paid by CBS. Sportscaster Bud Palmer provided the "play-by-play", and Dick Button provided the commentary for the event, a role Button continued to perform for decades after the Championships broadcasts were picked up by ABC Sports in subsequent years.

== Senior results ==
=== Men ===
The men's competition was won by Bradley Lord, likewise in a come-from-behind victory in the free skating after having been second to Gregory Kelley in the compulsory figures.

Rank	Name
1	Bradley Lord
2	Gregory Kelley
3	Tim Brown
4	Douglas Ramsay
5	Bruce Heiss

=== Ladies ===
Stephanie Westerfeld had a narrow lead over Laurence Owen after the compulsory figures and performed well enough in the free skating that she might have won the competition. However, Owen followed with a superior effort in the free skating and won the title on a 4-1 split of the first-place ordinals.

Rank	Name
1	Laurence Owen
2	Stephanie Westerfeld
3	Rhode Lee Michelson
4	Karen Howland
5	Vicky Fisher

=== Pairs ===
Maribel Owen / Dudley Richards, the silver medalists from the previous year, were the clear winners.

Rank	Name
1	Maribel Owen / Dudley Richards
2	Ila Ray Hadley / Ray Hadley, Jr.
3	Laurie Hickox / William Hickox
4	Janet Browning / Jim Browning

=== Ice dancing (Gold dance) ===
Diane Sherbloom / Larry Pierce—skating in their first season together—took the championship.

Rank	Name
1	Diane Sherbloom / Larry Pierce
2	Dona Lee Carrier / Roger Campbell
3	Patricia Dineen / Robert Dineen
4	Jan Jacobsen / Marshall Campbell
5	Thomasine Pierce / Roy Speeg
6	Katrine Neil / Peter Betts

== Junior results ==
=== Men ===
Rank	Name
1	Monty Hoyt
2	Scott Ethan Allen
3	David Edwards
4	Buddy Zack
5	Gary Visconti
6	Tommy Litz
7	Ronnie Frank
8	Walter Hypes
9	Bobby McKay

=== Ladies ===
Rank	Name
1	Lorraine Hanlon
2	Carol Noir
3	Lynn Thomas
4	Yvonne Drummond
5	Pamela Zekman
6	Michelle Monnier
7	Donna Abbott
8	Wanda Mae Guntert
9	Linda Galbraith

=== Pairs ===
Rank	Name
1	Vivian Joseph / Ronald Joseph
2	Dorothyann Nelson / Pieter Kollen
3	Irma Staro / Richard Callaghan
4	Cynthia Kauffman / Ronald Kauffman
5	Elizabeth George / Paul George
6	Nancy Streff / James Kelleher
7	Elizabeth Hickman / William Rider

=== Ice dancing (Silver dance) ===
Rank	Name
1	Rosemary McEvoy / Ralph Owen
2	Ila Ray Hadley / Ray Hadley, Jr.
3	Dorothyann Nelson / Pieter Kollen
4	Wilma Piper / Stanley Urban
5*	Susan Bright / Robert Munz
6*	Linda Rae Anderson / King Cole
7*	Anne Leyden / Monroe Meier
8*	Constance Caracciola / Donald Parent
9*	Georgia Taylor / Howard Taylor
10*	Linda Robinson / John Bickel
11*	Sally Wells / William Lincoln
12*	Margaret Mosford / Ben Wade

*Eliminated before Final Round

== Aftermath ==
Following the U.S. Championships, all the top skaters with the exception of Brown (who was ill; his place was taken by fourth-place finisher Ramsay) took part in the North American Figure Skating Championships in Philadelphia, where Owen captured the ladies title. The team then immediately departed for the World Figure Skating Championships in Prague on February 14, 1961, on board Sabena Flight 548. However, they never arrived; their flight crashed near Brussels, Belgium the next morning, killing all on board (including coaches, officials, and family members). The few team members who had not made the trip included skater Brown, and coach Ronald Ludington (who was unable to afford the travel expenses).

The U.S. Figure Skating Memorial Fund was established eight days after the crash by F. Ritter Shumway, then-president of the USFSA, and the fund has continued to this day. Its purpose is to provide help to promising skaters who lack funding for equipment. Peggy Fleming and Scott Hamilton are among future champions who have credited the memorial fund with being vital to their careers. RISE, a documentary film about the 1961 team, was released on February 17, 2011, two days after the 50th anniversary of the crash.

== Sources ==
- "The 1961 United States Championships", Skating magazine, April 1961
