= 1960 World Figure Skating Championships =

Annual figure skating competition held in 1960

- Type: ISU Championship
- Date: March 1 – 5
- Season: 1960
- Location: Vancouver, British Columbia, Canada

Champions
- Men's singles: (France) Alain Giletti
- Ladies' singles: (United States) Carol Heiss
- Pairs: (Canada) Barbara Wagner / Robert Paul
- Ice dance: (United Kingdom) Doreen Denny / Courtney Jones
- Previous: 1959 World Championships
- Next: 1962 World Championships

The World Figure Skating Championships is an annual figure skating competition sanctioned by the International Skating Union in which figure skaters compete for the title of World Champion.

The 1960 competitions for men, ladies, pair skating, and ice dancing took place from March 1 to 5 in Vancouver, British Columbia, Canada. It was the first time that the participants per country in each category was limited to three. This rule is kept since.

== Medal table ==
* Host nation (Canada)

Rank	Nation	Gold	Silver	Bronze	Total
1	Canada*	1	3	0	4
2	France	1	0	2	3
3	United States	1	0	1	2
4	Great Britain	1	0	0	1
5	Netherlands	0	1	0	1
6	West Germany	0	0	1	1
Totals (6 entries)		4	4	4	12

== Results ==
=== Men ===
Rank	Name	Places
1	(France) Alain Giletti	9
2	(Canada) Donald Jackson	12
3	(France) Alain Calmat	23
4	(Austria) Norbert Felsinger	30
5	(West Germany) Tilo Gutzeit	39
6	(United States) Bradley Lord	47
7	(West Germany) Manfred Schnelldorfer	52
8	(Canada) Donald McPherson	49
9	(United States) Gregory Kelley	55
10	(Austria) Peter Jonas	78
11	(Canada) Louis Stong	80
12	(Japan) Nobuo Satō	87
13	(Switzerland) Hubert Köpfler	90
14	(United Kingdom) Robin Jones	94
15	(United Kingdom) David Clements	101
16	(Australia) Tim Spencer	106
17	(Australia) William Cherrell	119

Judges:

- (Switzerland) Emile Finsterwald
- (Canada) William Lewis
- (France) Gérard Rodrigues-Henriques
- (United States) Harold G. Storke
- (West Germany) Adolf Walker
- (Austria) Franz Wojtanowskyj
- (United Kingdom) Geoffrey Yates

=== Ladies ===
Rank	Name	Places
1	(United States) Carol Heiss	9
2	(Netherlands) Sjoukje Dijkstra	19
3	(United States) Barbara Roles	26
4	(Austria) Regine Heitzer	44
5	(Netherlands) Joan Haanappel	48
6	(Czechoslovakia) Jana Mrázková	61
7	(Canada) Wendy Griner	61
8	(Austria) Karin Frohner	75
9	(United States) Laurence Owen	76
10	(Italy) Anna Galmarini	89
11	(France) Dany Rigoulot	103
12	(France) Nicole Hassler	115
13	(Canada) Sonia Snelling	112
14	(Japan) Miwa Fukuhara	122
15	(Canada) Shirra Kenworthy	137
16	(Japan) Junko Ueno	145
17	(West Germany) Bärbel Martin	151
18	(West Germany) Ursel Barkey	162
19	(Switzerland) Fränzi Schmidt	171
20	(United Kingdom) Carolyn Krau	176
21	(Switzerland) Liliane Crosa	185
22	(Italy) Carla Tichatschek	190
23	(Australia) Beverly Helmore	209
24	(Australia) Mary Wilson	214

Judges:

- (Netherlands) Charlotte Benedict-Stieber
- (United Kingdom) Pamela Davis
- (Austria) Martin Felsenreich
- (West Germany) Theo Klemm
- (Canada) William Lewis
- (Italy) Giovanni de Mori
- (France) Gérard Rodrigues-Henriques
- (Czechoslovakia) Emil Skákala
- (United States) Harold G. Storke

=== Pairs ===
Rank	Name	Places
1	(Canada) Barbara Wagner / Robert Paul	9
2	(Canada) Maria Jelinek / Otto Jelinek	21
3	(West Germany) Marika Kilius / Hans-Jürgen Bäumler	24
4	(West Germany) Margret Göbl / Franz Ningel	42
5	(Soviet Union) Nina Zhuk / Stanislav Zhuk	53
6	(United States) Nancy Ludington / Ronald Ludington	59
7	(Austria) Diana Hinko / Heinz Döpfl	67.5
8	(Soviet Union) Lyudmila Belousova / Oleg Protopopov	68
9	(West Germany) Rita Blumenberg / Werner Mensching	77.5
10	(United States) Maribel Owen / Dudley Richards	90
11	(Canada) Debbi Wilkes / Guy Revell	92
12	(United States) Ila Hadley / Ray Hadley	99

Judges:

- (Netherlands) Charlotte Benedict-Stieber
- (United Kingdom) Pamela Davis
- (Switzerland) Emile Finsterwald
- (West Germany) Theo Klemm
- (Canada) William Lewis
- (Italy) Giovanni de Mori
- (Czechoslovakia) Emil Skákala
- (United States) Harold G. Storke
- (Austria) Franz Wojtanowskyj

=== Ice dance ===
Rank	Name	Places
1	(United Kingdom) Doreen Denny / Courtney Jones	7
2	(Canada) Virginia Thompson / William McLachlan	16
3	(France) Christiane Guhel / Jean Guhel	22
4	(United States) Margie Ackles / Charles Phillips	25
5	(United States) Marilyn Meeker / Larry Pierce	39
6	(Canada) Ann Martin / Gilles Vanasse	46
7	(Canada) Svata Staroba / Mirek Staroba	52
8	(United States) Yvonne Littlefield / Roger Campbell	52
9	(West Germany) Rita Paucka / Peter Kwiet	56

Judges:

- (Switzerland) Emile Finsterwald
- (Canada) J. A. McKechnie
- (France) Jacqueline Meudec
- (West Germany) Hermann Schiechtl
- (United Kingdom) L. C. Seagrave
- (United States) John R. Shoemaker
- (Czechoslovakia) Emil Skákala
