= 1959 World Figure Skating Championships =

Annual figure skating competition held in 1959

- Type: ISU Championship
- Season: 1959
- Location: (United States) Colorado Springs, Colorado USA
- Venue: Broadmoor Ice Palace

Champions
- Men's singles: (United States) David Jenkins
- Ladies' singles: (United States) Carol Heiss
- Pairs: (Canada) Barbara Wagner / Robert Paul
- Ice dance: (United Kingdom) Doreen Denny / Courtney Jones
- Previous: 1958 World Championships
- Next: 1960 World Championships

The World Figure Skating Championships is an annual figure skating competition sanctioned by the International Skating Union in which figure skaters compete for the title of World Champion.

The 1959 competitions for men, ladies, pair skating, and ice dancing took place in Colorado Springs, Colorado, USA.

== Medal table ==
* Host nation (United States)

Rank	Nation	Gold	Silver	Bronze	Total
1	United States*	2	1	2	5
2	Canada	1	1	1	3
3	Great Britain	1	0	0	1
4	Austria	0	1	0	1
4	West Germany	0	1	0	1
6	Netherlands	0	0	1	1
Totals (6 entries)		4	4	4	12

== Results ==
=== Men ===
Rank	Name	Age	Points	Places	CF		FS		Total
1	(United States) David Jenkins	22	183.65	7	2	688.1	1	597.5	1285.6
2	(Canada) Donald Jackson	18	178.07	18	4	662.2	2	584.3	1246.5
3	(United States) Tim Brown	19	179.91	19	1	694.9	5	543.5	1238.4
4	(France) Alain Giletti	19	175.22	26	3	666.3	3	560.3	1226.6
5	(Czechoslovakia) Karol Divín	23	166.05	42	6	615.9	4	546.5	1162.4
6	(West Germany) Tilo Gutzeit	21	163.37	52	8	608.8	7	534.8	1143.6
7	(France) Alain Calmat	18	162.20	53	7	614.4	9	521.0	1135.4
8	(United States) Bradley Lord	19	161.70	56	9	605.8	8	526.1	1131.9
9	(Austria) Norbert Felsinger	19	161.34	56.5	5	617.7	10	511.7	1129.4
10	(Canada) Edward Collins	18	161.34	61.5	11	590.7	6	538.7	1129.4
11	(United States) Robert Brewer	19		71	10	604.1			
12	(United Kingdom) David Clements	19		84	13	522.7			
13	(Switzerland) Hubert Köpfler	23		91	12	593.9			

Judges:

- (France) P. Baron
- (United Kingdom) Pamela Davis
- (Switzerland) Karl Enderlin
- (Canada) Donald Gilchrist
- (West Germany) Theo Klemm
- (Austria) Edwin Kucharz
- (United States) R. Sackett

=== Ladies ===
Rank	Name	Age	Points	Places	CF		FS		Total
1	(United States) Carol Heiss	19	194.05	7	1	771.9	1	586.5	1358.4
2	(Austria) Hanna Walter	19	175.01	20	2	698.4	6	526.7	1225.1
3	(Netherlands) Sjoukje Dijkstra	17	174.74	24	3	667.2	3	556.0	1223.2
4	(West Germany) Ina Bauer	19	170.54	30	6	633.3	2	560,5	1193.8
5	(United States) Barbara Roles	17	171.55	31	4	680.1	7	520.8	1200.9
6	(United States) Lynn Finnegan		166.65	40	7	628.9	4	537.5	1166.6
7	(Austria) Regine Heitzer	15	160.65	54	9	608.7	8	515.9	1124.6
8	(United States) Nancy Heiss		161.58	56	8	621.9	10	509.2	1131.1
9	(Italy) Anna Galmarini	16	161.01	60	10	592.3	5	534.8	1127.1
10	(Canada) Sandra Tewkesbury	17	156.74	78	13	563.5	9	515.7	1079.2
11	(Canada) Margaret Crosland	19	151.72	82	11	575.5	13	486.6	1062.1
12	(Canada) Sonia Snelling		150.31	82	14	554.6	11	497.6	1052.2
13	(Italy) Carla Tichatschek	18	150.10	82	15	556.7	12	494.0	1050.7
14	(Japan) Yūko Araki		148.71	89	12	561.0	14	480.0	1041.0
WD	(Netherlands) Joan Haanappel	18	DNF		5	633.6			

Judges:

- (Italy) Grazia Barcellona
- (Netherlands) Charlotte Benedict-Stieber
- (United Kingdom) Pamela Davis
- (Canada) P. Devine
- (West Germany) Theo Klemm
- (United States) Alex Krupy
- (Austria) Oskar Madl

=== Pairs ===
Rank	Name	Places
1	(Canada) Barbara Wagner / Robert Paul	9
2	(West Germany) Marika Kilius / Hans-Jürgen Bäumler	19
3	(United States) Nancy Ludington / Ronald Ludington	35.5
4	(Canada) Maria Jelinek / Otto Jelinek	37
5	(West Germany) Margret Göbl / Franz Ningel	40.5
6	(United States) Maribel Owen / Dudley Richards	50
7	(United States) Gayle Freed / Karl Freed	59
8	(Austria) Diana Hinko / Heinz Döpfl	72

Judges:

- (Italy) Grazia Barcellona
- (France) P. Baron
- (Netherlands) Charlotte Benedict-Stieber
- (United Kingdom) Pamela Davis
- (Switzerland) Karl Enderlin
- (Canada) Donald Gilchrist
- (West Germany) Theo Klemm
- (Austria) Oskar Madl
- (United States) R. Sackett

=== Ice dance ===
Rank	Name	Places
1	(United Kingdom) Doreen Denny / Courtney Jones	6
2	(United States) Andree Anderson / Donald Jacoby	12
3	(Canada) Geraldine Fenton / William McLachlan	14
4	(United States) Margie Ackles / Charles Phillips	25
5	(Canada) Ann Martin / Edward Collins	28
6	(France) Christiane Guhel / Jean Guhel	30
7	(United Kingdom) Cathrine Morris / Michael Robinson	33
8	(Canada) Svata Staroba / Mirek Staroba	38
9	(United States) Judy Lamar / Ronald Ludington	39

Judges:

- (Canada) P. Devine
- (United Kingdom) Alexander Gordon
- (United States) Harold Hartshorne
- (Austria) Edwin Kucharz
- (France) Jacqueline Meudec

== Sources ==
- Result List provided by the ISU
