= Sjoukje Dijkstra =

Dutch figure skater (1942–2024)

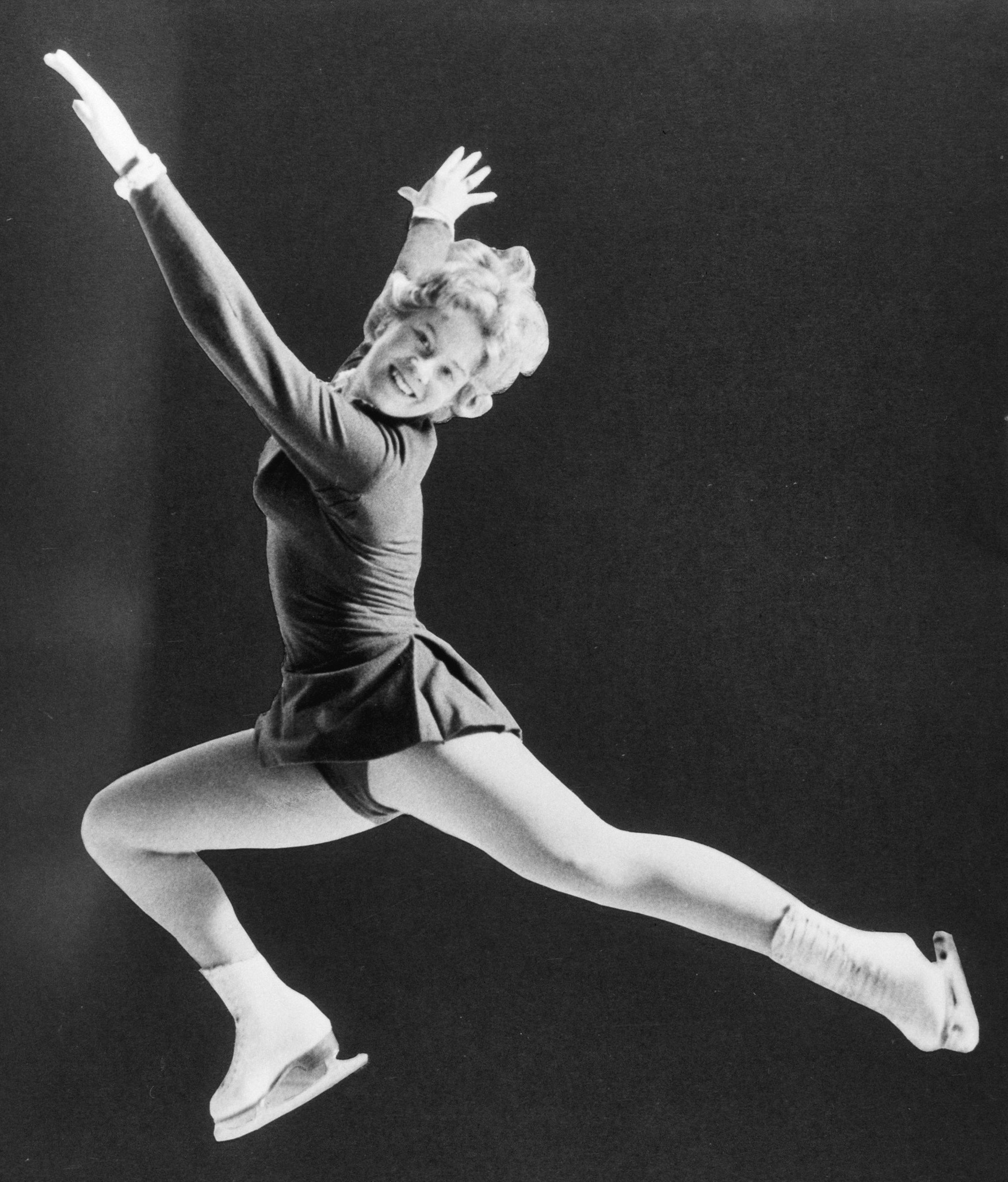
- Dijkstra in 1965

Personal information
- Full name: Sjoukje Rosalinde Dijkstra
- Other names: Sjoukje Kossmayer
- Born: 28 January 1942 Akkrum, Netherlands
- Died: 2 May 2024 (aged 82) Someren, Netherlands
- Height: 1.69 m (5 ft 7 in)

Figure skating career
- Country: Netherlands
- Retired: 1964
Medal record
Representing Netherlands
Olympic Games
Gold medal – first place	1964 Innsbruck	Singles
Silver medal – second place	1960 Squaw Valley	Singles
World Championships
Gold medal – first place	1964 Dortmund	Singles
Gold medal – first place	1963 Cortina d'Ampezzo	Singles
Gold medal – first place	1962 Prague	Singles
Silver medal – second place	1960 Vancouver	Singles
Bronze medal – third place	1959 Colorado Springs	Singles
European Championships
Gold medal – first place	1964 Grenoble	Singles
Gold medal – first place	1963 Budapest	Singles
Gold medal – first place	1962 Geneva	Singles
Gold medal – first place	1961 Berlin	Singles
Gold medal – first place	1960 Garmisch-Partenkirchen	Singles
Silver medal – second place	1959 Davos	Singles
Dutch Championships
Gold medal – first place	1959 The Hague	Singles
Gold medal – first place	1960 The Hague	Singles
Gold medal – first place	1961 The Hague	Singles
Gold medal – first place	1962 The Hague	Singles
Gold medal – first place	1963 The Hague	Singles
Gold medal – first place	1964 The Hague	Singles
Silver medal – second place	1955 The Hague	Singles
Silver medal – second place	1956 The Hague	Singles
Silver medal – second place	1957 The Hague	Singles
Silver medal – second place	1958 The Hague	Singles
Bronze medal – third place	1954 The Hague	Singles

Sjoukje Rosalinde Dijkstra (Dutch pronunciation: [ˈɕʌukjə ˈdɛikstraː]; 28 January 1942 – 2 May 2024) was a Dutch competitive figure skater. She was the 1964 Olympic champion in ladies' singles, the 1960 Olympic silver medalist, a three-time World champion (1962–1964), five-time European champion (1960–1964), and the six-time Dutch national champion (1959–1964). She was the first Dutch athlete to win a Winter Olympics gold medal.

== Personal life ==
Sjoukje Rosalinde Dijkstra was born on 28 January 1942 in Akkrum, Netherlands. She was the daughter of Lou Dijkstra, a speed skater who competed in the 1936 Winter Olympics. She married Karl Kossmayer, with whom she has two daughters, Rosalie and Katja.

Dijkstra died on 2 May 2024, at the age of 82 from cancer in the kidney and heart failure.

== Career ==
During the 1953–54 season, Dijkstra was awarded her first senior national medal, bronze behind Nellie Maas and Joan Haanappel, and was assigned to her first ISU Championship, the 1954 Europeans in Bolzano, where she placed 19th. She finished 12th at the 1956 Winter Olympics in Cortina d'Ampezzo, Italy.

After four seasons ranked second to Haanappel, Dijkstra defeated her for the Dutch national title in the 1958–59 season. She also stood on ISU Championship podiums for the first time, taking silver at the 1959 Europeans and bronze at the 1959 Worlds.

Dijkstra won silver behind Carol Heiss at the 1960 Winter Olympics in Squaw Valley, California and at the 1960 World Championships in Vancouver. She became the dominant ladies' single skater after Heiss retired from competition.

Dijkstra won all the World and European Championships held between 1961 and 1964 (except the 1961 World Championships, which were cancelled following the Sabena Flight 548 crash). After taking her sixth consecutive national title, she went on to win gold at the 1964 Winter Olympics in Innsbruck, Austria. It was the first gold for the Netherlands at the Winter Olympics. She is the last person to have won Olympic gold in ladies' figure skating after winning a silver or bronze medal at a prior Olympics.

During her competitive career, Dijkstra was coached by Arnold Gerschwiler in Richmond, London. While her main strength was compulsory figures, she was also a very powerful and athletic free skater who could perform high-quality double Axel jumps and flying spins, and who skated with easy movement and strong flow. At 1.68 metres, she was fairly tall for a skater, and one magazine article noted that "she is much more slender in person than she appears on the ice".

After 1964, Dijkstra turned professional and toured with Holiday On Ice from 1964 to 1972. She became the advisor to the figure skating section of the Dutch Skating Federation (Dutch: Koninklijke Nederlandsche Schaatsenrijders Bond (KNSB)) in 1985. In 2005, she was awarded the Fanny Blankers-Koen Trophy for her contributions to Dutch sports. On 9 January 2014, she was inducted into the International Figure Skating Hall of Fame at a ceremony during the 2014 U.S. Championships in Boston, Massachusetts.

Dijkstra appeared as herself on 13 September 1965 episode of To Tell the Truth, receiving three of the four possible votes.

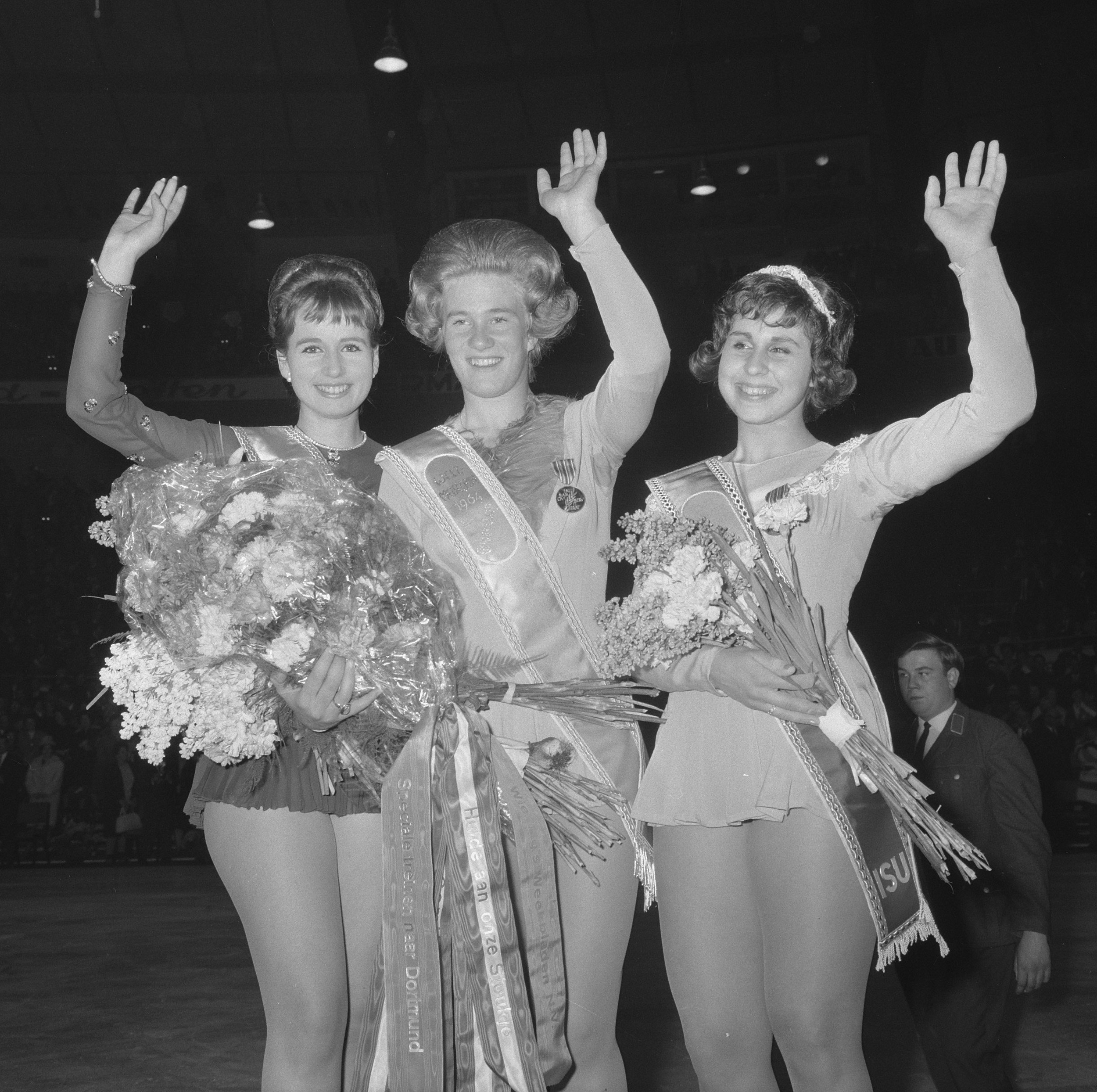
1964 World Figure Skating Championships, ladies' singles medalists (left to right: Regine Heitzer, Sjoukje Dijkstra, Petra Burka)

== Results ==
International
Event	53–54	54–55	55–56	56–57	57–58	58–59	59–60	60–61	61–62	62–63	63–64
Olympics			12th				2nd				1st
World Champ.		21st	16th	12th	16th	3rd	2nd		1st	1st	1st
European Champ.	19th		7th		6th	2nd	1st	1st	1st	1st	1st
Richmond Trophy		2nd	3rd	1st	1st	1st					
National
Dutch Champ.	3rd	2nd	2nd	2nd	2nd	1st	1st	1st	1st	1st	1st

Awards
Preceded by Gerrit Schulte	Dutch Sportswoman of the Year; 1959 to 1964	Succeeded by Ada Kok
