= Marilyn Meeker =

American ice dancer

Marilyn Meeker (born February 16, 1942) is an American former ice dancer. With partner Larry Pierce, she captured the junior title at the 1959 U.S. Championships. Competing on the senior level the following year, they won the silver medal at the 1960 U.S. Championships and placed fifth at the 1960 World Championships.

Meeker broke her ankle in training in December 1960, six weeks before the 1961 U.S. Championships. Pierce joined forces with Diane Sherbloom and won the gold medal at Nationals. Pierce and Sherbloom were killed, along with the rest of the U.S. Figure Skating team, when their plane (Sabena Flight 548) crashed near Brussels, Belgium on the way to the World Championships.

As of March 2025, Marilyn (Meeker) Durham resides in New Braunfels, Texas with her husband of 63 years, John. They have two adult children, Diana and Mark, and two 32-year-old granddaughters Sarah and Sterling. Durham attended the 2011 National Championships in Greensboro, South Carolina, to commemorate the 50th anniversary of the 1961 World Team disaster. She stated that she finally found closure at this event, which she attended at the insistence of her close friend Sandy Schwomeyer Lamb.

She and Larry Pierce both attended Broad Ripple High School. Upon graduation, she attended Indiana University.

== Results ==
(with Larry Pierce)

Event	1959	1960
World Championships		5th
U.S. Championships	1st J.	2nd
