= Figure skating at the 1960 Winter Olympics – Women's singles =

Women's singles at the VIII Olympic Winter Games
- Venue: Blyth Arena; Squaw Valley, California, United States
- Dates: 21 February 1960; 23 February 1960
- Competitors: 26 from 13 nations

Medalists
1st place, gold medalist(s)		Carol Heiss	United States
2nd place, silver medalist(s)		Sjoukje Dijkstra	Netherlands
3rd place, bronze medalist(s)		Barbara Roles	United States

The women's single skating competition of the 1960 Winter Olympics was held at the Blyth Arena in Squaw Valley, California, United States. The compulsory figures section took place on Sunday 21 February 1960 with the free skating section concluding the event two days later. Each judge ranked each skater by Ordinal Placement from first to last place. If a skater was ranked first by a majority of the judges, that skater was placed first overall, this process was repeated for each place. If more than one skater had a majority ranking for the same position then a series of tiebreaks were in place, indicated in order in the result section.

Carol Heiss won gold for the United States going one better from her silver medal at the 1956 Olympics.

== Results ==
Pl.	Name	Nation	MP	TOOM	TO	TP	CFP
1	Carol Heiss	United States	9x1+	9.0	9.0	1490.1	837.8
2	Sjoukje Dijkstra	Netherlands	7x2+	14.0	20.0	1424.8	792.0
3	Barbara Roles	United States	8x3+	22.0	26.0	1414.9	772.9
4	Jana Mrázková	Czechoslovakia	6x5+	27.0	53.0	1338.7	732.5
5	Joan Haanappel	Netherlands	7x6+	38.0	52.0	1331.9	737.1
6	Laurence Owen	United States	6x6+	28.0	57.0	1343.0	741.7
7	Regine Heitzer	Austria	6x6+	30.0	58.0	1327.9	719.6
8	Anna Galmarini	Italy	6x9+	48.0	79.0	1295.0	704.4
9	Karin Frohner	Austria	5x9+	42.0	99.0	1266.0	675.5
10	Sandra Tewkesbury	Canada	8x10+	67.0	78.0	1296.1	701.7
11	Nicole Hassler	France	7x11+	68.0	97.0	1272.6	687.3
12	Wendy Griner	Canada	8x12+	85.0	98.0	1275.0	682.6
13	Danielle Rigoulot	France	6x12+	65.0	107.0	1253.8	682.6
14	Bärbel Martin	United Team of Germany	5x14+	66.0	132.0	1219.8	656.3
15	Patricia Pauley	Great Britain	5x14+	67.0	134.0	1213.8	680.8
16	Carla Tichatschek	Italy	5x15+	74.0	143.0	1201.1	674.7
17	Junko Ueno	Japan	5x17+	81.0	158.0	1176.5	677.9
18	Ursel Barkey	United Team of Germany	6x19+	103.0	166.0	1164.5	653.4
19	Carolyn Krau	Great Britain	6x19+	105.0	168.0	1160.3	669.2
20	Liliane Crosa	Switzerland	6x19+	107.0	171.0	1157.4	625.4
21	Miwa Fukuhara	Japan	8x21+	166.0	188.0	1134.7	644.4
22	Franziska Schmidt	Switzerland	5x20+	96.0	184.0	1141.8	628.2
23	Marion Sage	South Africa	6x23+	138.0	210.0	1000.9	545.9
24	Aileen Shaw	Australia	9x25+	221.0	221.0	965.7	541.4
25	Patricia Eastwood	South Africa	8x25+	193.0	219.0	970.8	582.4
26	Mary Wilson	Australia	9x26+	232.0	232.0	890.2	521.4

Referee:

- Josef Dědič

Assistant Referee:

- Alexander D.C. Gordon

Judges:

- (Austria) Martin Felsenreich
- (Canada) John Greig
- (Czechoslovakia) Emil Skákala
- (West Germany) Adolf Walker
- (United Kingdom) Pamela Davis
- (Italy) Giovanni de Mori
- (Japan) Shotaro Kobayashi
- (Netherlands) Charlotte Benedict-Stieber
- (United States) Howell Janes
