= Edi Scholdan =

Austrian figure skater & coach (1911/12–1961)

Eduard Scholdan
Personal information
- Other names: Edi Scholdan
- Born: 1911 or 1912 Vienna, Austria
- Died: February 15, 1961 Kampenhout, Belgium
- Cause of death: Plane crash

Figure skating career
- Country: Austria

Eduard "Edi" Scholdan (1911 or 1912 — February 15, 1961) was an Austrian figure skater and figure skating coach.

== Personal life ==
Scholdan was born in Vienna. He moved to the United States in 1938. In 1946, he married a figure skater, Roberta Jenks, with whom he had two children, Ruth and Jimmy, and a stepdaughter, Dixie Lee.

== Career ==
Scholdan represented Austria as a competitor at the 1933 World Championships. However, he became better known as a coach; he worked at the Broadmoor Skating Club in Colorado Springs, Colorado beginning in 1945. His students included:

- Eva Pawlik, the 1948 Olympic silver medalist
- Hayes Alan Jenkins, the 1956 Olympic champion
- David Jenkins, the 1960 Olympic champion
- James Grogan, 1952 Olympic bronze medalist
- Ina Bauer
- Karol Kennedy / Peter Kennedy, the 1950 World pairs champions
- Ronnie Robertson, the 1955 World silver medalist

In 1961, Scholdan and his 13-year-old son were among those killed in the crash of Sabena Flight 548, which was carrying the entire U.S. Figure Skating team to the 1961 World Championships. Aged 50 at the time of his death, he was travelling as the coach of Gregory Kelley, Stephanie Westerfeld, and Bill Hickox and Laurie Hickox. Scholdan had planned to take his son to Vienna and other places in Europe following the competition.

The Professional Skaters Association's annual awards are called "EDI awards" in Scholdan's honor. Scholdan was president of that organization from 1950 to 1954 and was inducted into the inaugural class of their Coaches Hall of Fame in 2001.

On January 28, 2011, Scholdan was inducted into the United States Figure Skating Hall of Fame as part of the 1961 U.S. World Team.
