= Douglas Ramsay =

American figure skater (1944–1961)

- Douglas Ramsay

Personal information
- Full name: Douglas Alexander Ramsay
- Born: May 5, 1944 Detroit, Michigan, United States
- Died: February 15, 1961 (aged 16) Berg-Kampenhout, Flemish Brabant, Belgium
- Cause of death: Plane crash
- Height: 5 ft 3 in (160 cm)

Figure skating career
- Country: United States
- Coach: William Swallender
- Skating club: Detroit Skating Club

Douglas Ramsay (May 5, 1944 – February 15, 1961) was an American figure skater who competed in men's singles.

Known as "Dick Button Jr.", he early won the reputation of being a particularly charismatic free skater and an audience favorite. After placing 4th at the Junior level at the 1959 United States Figure Skating Championships, in 1960 he narrowly won the Junior title over Bruce Heiss (brother of Carol Heiss) and Frank Carroll with a performance described as "dazzling".

Ramsay was the only skater to perform a triple jump at the 1961 United States Figure Skating Championships, where he finished fourth due to a poor performance in compulsory figures. Due to the illness of bronze medalist Tim Brown, Ramsay was selected to compete at the 1961 North American Figure Skating Championships and World Figure Skating Championships as the alternate. At the North American Championships in Philadelphia, Ramsay established himself as "the darling of the audience" and finished fourth in spite of missing a double axel.

Ramsay grew up in Detroit. His grade school, Thomas A. Edison, where he practiced skating on a rink they would flood every winter, renamed the park adjacent to the playground in his memory.

Ramsay was en route to the World Championships in 1961, along with his coach, William Swallender, when their plane (Sabena Flight 548) crashed near Brussels, Belgium, killing all on board. He was 16 at the time of his death.

On January 28, 2011, Ramsay was posthumously inducted into the United States Figure Skating Hall of Fame as part of the 1961 U.S. World Team.

== Results ==
Event	1958	1959	1960	1961
North American Championships			4th	
U.S. Championships	5th J.	4th J.	1st J.	4th

J. = junior
