= Gregory Kelley =

American figure skater

Personal information
- Full name: Gregory Eric Kelley
- Born: May 19, 1944 Newton, Massachusetts, U.S.
- Died: February 15, 1961 (aged 16) near Kampenhout, Belgium
- Cause of death: Plane crash

Figure skating career
- Country: United States
- Discipline: Men's singles
Medal record
North American Championships
| Bronze medal – third place | 1961 Philadelphia | Men's singles |

Gregory Eric "Greg" Kelley (May 19, 1944 – February 15, 1961) was an American figure skater who competed in men's singles. He won the junior title at the 1959 U.S. Figure Skating Championships and finished ninth at the 1960 World Figure Skating Championships after the top three U.S. skaters skipped the event. In 1961, he won the silver medal at the U.S. Nationals and the bronze at the North American Figure Skating Championships.

Kelley was the youngest of eight siblings. His parents were Dr. Vincent Kelley, who was a top surgeon in Boston, and his wife Nathalie. Kelley began skating at age eight after attending a learn-to-skate program at Boston's skating club. As a teenager, he moved to Colorado Springs, Colorado to train with Edi Scholdan at the Broadmoor Figure Skating Club. His older sister, Nathalie, took leave from her job as a high school science teacher to move to Colorado and serve as Kelley's chaperone. Aside from his figure skating career, Kelley's ambition was to be a doctor like his father. Kelley was a member of the American Numismatic Association and, as of 1961, had the world's largest collection of three-dollar bills. Kelley owned 42 of the 65 three-dollar bills that were known to exist.

Kelley was en route to the World Championships in 1961 when his plane (Sabena Flight 548) crashed near Brussels, Belgium, killing all on board. He was 16 at the time of his death. His 29-year-old sister, Nathalie, who accompanied her brother on the flight as a chaperone, was also killed in the crash.

On January 28, 2011, Kelley was inducted into the United States Figure Skating Hall of Fame as part of the 1961 World Team.

== Competitive highlights ==
| Event | 1957 | 1958 | 1959 | 1960 | 1961 |
|---|---|---|---|---|---|
| World Championships | | | | 9th | |
| North American Championships | | | | | 3rd |
| U.S. Championships | 1st N. | 2nd J. | 1st J. | 5th | 2nd |

- N = Novice level; J = Junior level
