= Barbara Martin =

Barbara Martin may refer to:

- Barbara Martin (singer) (1943–2020), American R&B singer (The Supremes)
- Barbara Leonard (politician) (née Barbara Martin; 1924–2013), American politician
- Barbara Martin (athlete), English athlete
- Bärbel Martin, (born 1940), German figure skater
