= William Hickox =

American pair skater

Personal information
- Full name: William Holmes Hickox
- Born: March 28, 1942 San Francisco, California, United States
- Died: February 15, 1961 (aged 18) Berg-Kampenhout, Flemish Brabant, Belgium
- Cause of death: Plane crash

Figure skating career
- Country: United States
- Skating club: SC of San Francisco

William Holmes Hickox (March 28, 1942 – February 15, 1961) was an American pair skater who competed with his sister Laurie Hickox. They won the bronze medal at the U.S. Championships, earning them the right to compete a month later at the World Championships in Prague. They also finished sixth at the North American Figure Skating Championships that year. They died along with their teammates on February 15, 1961 when Sabena Flight 548 crashed en route to the World Championships. He was 18 years old.

Hickox was also a cadet at the United States Air Force Academy.

On January 28, 2011, Hickox was inducted into the United States Figure Skating Hall of Fame as part of the 1961 U.S. World Team.

== Results ==
Pairs with Hickox

Event	1960	1961
North American Championships		6th
U.S. Championships	1st J.	3rd
