= Laurence Owen =

American figure skater (1944–1961)

- Laurence Owen is pictured on February 14, 1961, before boarding Sabena Flight 548 at Idlewild Airport in New York City.

Personal information
- Full name: Laurence Rochon Owen
- Other names: Laurie Owen; The Winchester Pixie
- Born: May 9, 1944 Oakland, California
- Died: February 15, 1961 (aged 16) Berg-Kampenhout, Flemish Brabant, Belgium
- Cause of death: Plane crash
- Height: 5 ft 6 in (168 cm)

Figure skating career
- Country: United States
- Skating club: SC of Boston
Medal record
Ladies' Figure skating
Representing United States
North American Championships
Gold medal – first place	1961 Philadelphia	Ladies' singles

Laurence Owen was pictured on cover of the February 13, 1961 issue of Sports Illustrated.

Laurence Rochon "Laurie" Owen (/lɔːrˈɔːns/; May 9, 1944 – February 15, 1961) was an American figure skater. She was the 1961 U.S. National Champion and represented the United States at the 1960 Winter Olympics, where she placed sixth. She was the daughter of Maribel Vinson and Guy Owen and the sister of Maribel Owen. Owen died, along with her mother, sister and the entire United States Figure Skating team, in the crash of Sabena Flight 548 en route to the 1961 World Figure Skating Championships. In 2011, on the 50th anniversary of the crash, Owen and the entire team was inducted into the United States Figure Skating Hall of Fame.

== Personal life ==
Owen was born in Oakland, California, and for the first eight years grew up in Berkeley. She was the second child of Guy Owen and Maribel Vinson, both talented figure skaters, and the younger sister of pairs skater Maribel Owen. She was named in honor of her Canadian paternal grandmother. Her parents taught skating and toured as professional figure skaters. When Laurence was a baby, she and her sister stayed with their maternal grandparents in Winchester, Massachusetts while their parents were on tour. She wrote for a school assignment that she was first introduced to ice skating while she stayed in Winchester, Massachusetts. Like her older sister, she started skating when she was a toddler, using figure skates with double blades to provide added support for a young skater.

Her parents had a troubled marriage and finally divorced in 1949, when Laurence was five, and her father moved to Washington. He then returned to Ottawa, where he died of a perforated ulcer in April 1952. His wife and daughters were not mentioned in his obituary, and it is unknown whether they attended his funeral Mass. Laurence and her sister Maribel lived with their mother in Berkeley.

At age five or six, Laurence resisted her mother's discipline. In a school paper, she described a dinnertime battle. Laurence hated eggs, which she thought were "slimy", and refused to eat them. Her mother made her sit at the breakfast table for up to two hours until she ate the cold egg. Once she hid her fried egg under a rug, which was found by the family's maid three days later. Then she threw the eggs out the window, where they were found by the family's Japanese gardener. Maribel Vinson then made Laurence eat two eggs instead of one egg every day for the following week. Laurence was also resistant to practicing her school figures ahead of a competition. She failed to qualify for a competition. When she was eight, her mother told Laurence she could not go to a summer camp and Laurence decided to work harder at her skating.

After the death of her father, Thomas Vinson, Maribel Vinson moved her family back to her girlhood home at 195 High Street in Winchester, where they lived with Maribel's mother, Gertrude Vinson. Laurence, who at school was known by her full name, attended Winchester Junior High School and then Winchester High School where in addition to maintaining her grueling training schedule she was an honor student, wrote poetry, and participated in several sports. She also had interest in writing, acting, and travel. Laurence was friendly, intelligent, and known for her beaming smile. In her mid-teens, she often wore pants at a time when other girls wore dresses and wore her hair in a short pixie cut. She was also a talented pianist who composed her own songs. She arranged the score of "La Damnation de Faust" by Hector Berlioz for her skating routine at the 1961 U.S. National Competition. Her mother, sister, and her sister's skating partner Dudley Richards told a reporter that Laurence sometimes liked to daydream and was less organized and focused on timeliness than her highly disciplined mother.

Her skating ambitions kept her busy and her Latin teacher worried that she didn't socialize enough with her classmates. Her mother, Maribel Vinson, informed the Latin teacher that ice skating improved concentration. Laurence recalled attending a school dance with a boy who was shorter than she was and danced too close. She went on one double date to the Totem Pole ballroom at Norumbega Park in Auburndale, Massachusetts in 1959 with a high school classmate who belonged to the school bridge club. Her date recalled that she appeared to be trying to leave the house before her mother and grandmother could meet him, and that she kissed him goodnight. She also enjoyed interactions with boys she met at international skating competitions. A Chilean alpine skier, Francisco "Pancho" Cortes, whom she found "darling", offered to trade his heavy blue sweater for hers during the 1960 Winter Olympics in Squaw Valley, California, but Laurence turned down the offer because she thought her own sweater was inferior in quality and it would have been unfair to Cortes. Paul George, then a 19-year-old junior pairs skater and Harvard student, taught Laurence how to drive and, at the direction of her mother, took Laurence to dances at the Longwood Cricket Club to give her experience with Boston society.

Laurence held her own in a household of outspoken women. Her maternal grandmother, Gertrude Vinson, who had cared for the girls for an extended period when they were small children, favored her younger granddaughter Laurence, whom she called her "lovey." Gertrude Vinson picked up after her, washed and mended her clothing, and did chores Laurence had forgotten to do. This annoyed Laurence's older sister, Maribel. Gertrude Vinson often picked Laurence up after school and drove her to the skating rink for her afternoon skating practice.

Laurence was also close to her mother and sister, though she sometimes fought with her mother, who had groomed her to be a champion skater since early childhood and placed tremendous pressure on her daughters to succeed academically as well as on the ice. Maribel Vinson yelled at her daughters, made them cry, and then started crying herself. On one occasion, Maribel yelled at Laurence during a skating lesson and Laurence put her fingers in her ears and pretended not to hear her. Her furious mother chased her around the rink and Laurence hid in the bathroom. In the weeks before the 1961 national competition, Laurence ran upstairs to get away from her mother and the choreographer when they went over her routine. The choreographer followed her and listened to Laurence recite the poetry she had written. For Laurence, creative writing was an escape from the pressure placed upon her by her mother.

Maribel Vinson also instilled a strong work ethic in her children. Laurence Owen wrote for a school assignment that "Realizing one's own potential is a great aid to success, but unless you support your talents with good solid work, such a realization does little good. This is a lesson, which I feel I have learned well – that there is no substitute for work, work, and still more work. Ability without effort is worthless."

== Career ==
In 1956, Laurence won the Eastern Junior Ladies title but was unable to participate in the United States Championships that year because of a broken wrist. In 1958, she placed third in the United States Figure Skating Championship Junior Ladies Division and, in 1959, won the United States Figure Skating Championship Junior Ladies Division.

In January 1960, Laurence placed third in the 1960 United States Figure Skating Championships and qualified for the 1960 Winter Olympics where she placed sixth. Her mother, a 1932 Winter Olympics Bronze Medalist and nine times US Singles Champion, was her coach.

On January 29, 1961, Laurence won the 1961 United States Figure Skating Championships in Colorado Springs and on February 12 that same year, won the 1961 North American Figure Skating Championships in Philadelphia. After her victory at the US Nationals, she became a media sensation and was nicknamed "The Winchester Pixie." On February 13, 1961, she appeared on the cover of Sports Illustrated magazine with a feature story that described her as "America's most exciting girl skater." In that same Sports Illustrated issue, writer Barbara Hellman noted that Owen had both great presence and a dancer's ability to relate to her music and described her free skating as having "an air, a style, an individuality which sets it apart from all the work done in free skating in recent years."

On January 28, 2011, Laurence was inducted into the United States Figure Skating Hall of Fame as part of the 1961 U.S. World Team. Her sister Maribel Owen also was inducted and her mother Maribel Vinson Owen was inducted for a third time in 2011, in her capacity as a 1961 World Team Coach. Previously, her mother had been inducted in the inaugural Class of 1976 as a singles skater and for a second time in 1994 as a pairs skater.

On February 17, 2011, the U.S. Figure Skating Association released the documentary film entitled "Rise". The movie chronicled the relationship between Owen and her mother, the airliner crash in Belgium and the rebirth of the United States Figure Skating Team after the crash.

== Death ==
As national champion, Laurence was selected as a member of the U.S. Figure Skating Team to compete in the 1961 World Figure Skating Championships, to be held in Prague, Czechoslovakia. The championships were scheduled to begin on February 22, 1961. Just before 7:30 pm EST, on Valentine's Day 1961, Owen, her mother Maribel Vinson-Owen, her sister Maribel and the rest of the US team, along with 16 of the team's friends, family and coaches, boarded Sabena Flight 548 at Idlewild Airport in New York. On February 15, 1961, about 10:00 am Brussels time, the Boeing 707 approached Zaventem Airport. The aircraft was on a long approach to runway 20 when, near the runway threshold and at a height of 900 feet, power was increased and the landing gear retracted. The airplane attempted to circle and land on another runway but never made it back to the airport. The plane made three 360-degree turns to the left, during which the bank angle increased more and more until the aircraft had climbed to 1500 feet and was in a near vertical attitude. The 707 then leveled wings, abruptly pitched up, lost speed, and started to spiral rapidly, nose down, towards the ground. It crashed and caught fire in a marshy area adjacent to a farm field less than two miles from the airport (50°55′15.2″N 04°31′36.4″E) at 10:04 a.m. Brussels time. All 72 people on board, as well as a farmer on the ground, were killed. Rescue workers discovered a signed copy of the Sports Illustrated magazine, featuring Owen with her signature pixie cut and a bright red skating dress on the cover, amid the wreckage. Laurence Owen was 16 years old.

The World Championships that year were cancelled out of respect for the United States team.

A memorial service for Laurence, her mother and sister was held February 25, 1961 at the Episcopal Church of the Epiphany in Winchester. and Laurence was interred that day beside her mother and sister in Mount Auburn Cemetery in Cambridge, Massachusetts.

Gertrude Vinson stayed active in the skating association following the plane crash and encouraged the young skaters. She was known as "Grammy" to the skaters in the club, who helped care for her following the loss of her family. She was interred beside her daughter and granddaughters following her own death in 1969.

== Epilogue ==
In her book on figure skating, Debbi Wilkes, a Canadian Hall of Fame skater and coach who watched Owen win her title, wrote:

"Laurence was wonderful. She had a fresh, wholesome look, but didn't fit into any mold. She was carefree and joyous on the ice. She had wonderful rosy cheeks, beautiful big eyes and a short shag haircut that feathered over her face and fluttered when she skated. I was totally enchanted by her."

Owen had planned to attend her mother's alma mater, Radcliffe College, with a view to eventually becoming a writer. Following her death, at her high school in Winchester, Massachusetts, Laurie Owen's English teacher read a poem to her classmates that Laurie had recently written. The poem ended with these words:

Gloom is but a shadow of the night, long past;
Hope is the light,
The radiance.

== Results ==
Event	1958	1959	1960	1961
Winter Olympics			6th	
World Championships			9th	
North American Championships				1st
U.S. Championships	3rd J	1st J.	3rd	1st

== See also ==
- Maribel Vinson
- Maribel Owen
- Guy Owen
- Sabena Flight 548
- Sports Illustrated cover jinx
