= Laurie Hickox =

American pair skater

- Laurie Hickox

Personal information
- Full name: Laurie Jean Hickox
- Other names: Laurie Hickox
- Born: December 6, 1945 San Francisco, California, United States
- Died: February 15, 1961 (aged 15) Berg-Kampenhout, Flemish Brabant, Belgium
- Cause of death: Plane crash

Figure skating career
- Country: United States
- Skating club: Skating Club of San Francisco

Laurie Jean Hickox (December 6, 1945 – February 15, 1961) was an American pair skater who competed with her brother William Hickox. They won the bronze medal at the U.S. Championships, earning them the right to compete a month later at the World Championships in Prague. They also finished sixth at the North American Figure Skating Championships that year. They died along with their teammates on February 15, 1961, when Sabena Flight 548 crashed near Brussels, Belgium en route to the World Championships. She was 15 years old.

== Background ==
Hickox was adopted soon after birth by Lute and Elinor Hickox and was raised in Berkeley, California. Her older brother retired from skating to enter the U.S. Air Force Academy, but their mother persuaded him to return to skating with Laurie and to enter the U.S. Figure Skating Championships with Laurie at the Broadmoor World Arena in January 1961.

On January 28, 2011, Hickox was inducted into the United States Figure Skating Hall of Fame as part of the 1961 U.S. World Team.

== Results ==
Pairs with Hickox

Event	1960	1961
North American Championships		6th
U.S. Championships	1st J.	3rd
