= Maribel Owen =

American figure skater

- Maribel Owen is pictured on February 14, 1961 before boarding Sabena Flight 548 at Idlewild Airport in New York City.

Personal information
- Full name: Maribel Yerxa Owen
- Born: April 25, 1940 Boston, Massachusetts
- Died: February 15, 1961 (aged 20) Berg-Kampenhout, Flemish Brabant, Belgium
- Cause of death: Plane crash
- Height: 5 ft 6 in (168 cm)

Figure skating career
- Country: United States
- Partner: Dudley Richards
- Coach: Maribel Vinson
- Skating club: SC of Boston
Medal record
Pairs' Figure skating
Representing the United States
North American Championships
Silver medal – second place	1961 Philadelphia	Pairs

Maribel Yerxa Owen (April 25, 1940 – February 15, 1961) was an American figure skater.

She was the daughter of skaters Maribel Vinson and Guy Owen and the sister of 1961 U.S. Ladies' Champion Laurence Owen. With pairs partner Dudley Richards, they placed tenth at 1960 Winter Olympics and won the U.S. national championship in 1961. Along with her mother, sister, and the U.S. Figure Skating team and coaches, Owen died in the crash of Sabena Flight 548 en route to the 1961 World Championships.

== Life and career ==
Born in Boston, Massachusetts, Owen was the first child born to Guy Owen and Maribel Vinson. She was named after her mother, and was known as "Maribel, Jr." or "Mara". Her younger sister Laurence was also a champion skater. Both were coached by their mother.

Owen began to skate when she was a toddler. She started out with figure skates that had double runners to provide greater balance for a beginning skater. She and her sister stayed with their maternal grandparents in Winchester, Massachusetts for long periods while their parents were touring. Her maternal grandmother, Gertrude Vinson, favored baby Laurence over 5-year-old Maribel, who asked too many questions. When the family lived in Berkeley, California, she competed in girls' singles competitions representing the St. Moritz Ice Skating Club. After her parents' divorce in 1949 and her father's death in 1952, Owen, her mother and sister returned to the Boston area in 1952 to live with her recently widowed maternal grandmother, Gertrude Vinson, in Winchester.

Owen formed a pairs team with Charles Foster, who was later president of the United States Figure Skating Association). In 1956, when she was 15, she and Foster became the U.S. junior national champions. That same year, Owen persuaded the United States Figure Skating Association to schedule the U.S. Figure Skating Championships ahead of the World Figure Skating Championships rather than to continue selecting team members based on their performance in competition during the previous year. Owen said this would enable the United States to select competitors for the world competition who would be in top physical condition at the time they competed.

Owen was deeply upset and cried when Foster told her that he planned to retire from skating just before the world competition to attend medical school. After several months without a skating partner, she teamed with Dudley Richards, a longtime friend and former college roommate of Ted Kennedy at Harvard. With Richards, Owen competed at the 1960 Winter Olympics, placing tenth after finishing runner-up at the U.S. championships. They won the 1961 United States Figure Skating Championships and the silver medal at the 1961 North American Figure Skating Championships. Owen was described as a "crisp, arrowy skater."

Owen was a senior at Boston University, where she was majoring in sociology and anthropology. She was also a member of Sigma Kappa sorority at Boston University. She hoped to become a teacher. Owen was close to her mother, though Maribel Vinson Owen was a demanding coach who set high expectations for both her daughters and was occasionally violent both verbally and physically. On one occasion, the younger Maribel swore at her mother during a skating practice and her mother made her kneel on the ice, in front of all of the other skaters, and beg forgiveness from God. The younger Maribel, who was more reserved than her mother and younger sister, also sometimes felt overshadowed by Laurence. The younger Maribel experienced significant stress from the pressures of her skating career and her university studies, which caused her to lose weight and develop a bleeding ulcer. She continued with her grueling schedule despite her pain. Richards, more than eight years her senior, became her partner when she was seventeen and was a close friend who often ran errands for the family. Richards was also emotionally supportive of Owen. Owen and Richards were romantically involved during the last months of their lives, and Richards had planned to propose marriage to Owen after the world competition in Prague.

== Death ==
As a result of winning the national championship, Owen was selected to be a member of the U.S. team for the 1961 World Figure Skating Championships in Prague, Czechoslovakia. The team was on Sabena Flight 548, a Boeing 707, which crashed on a clear morning near Brussels, Belgium, killing all on board. Owen was 20 years old. The World Championships that year were canceled following the crash.

A memorial service for Owen, her mother, and sister was held February 25, 1961 at the Episcopal Church of the Epiphany in Winchester. Owen was interred next to her mother and sister in Mount Auburn Cemetery in Cambridge. Her grandmother, Gertrude Vinson, was interred beside her daughter and granddaughters following her own death in 1969.

== Legacy ==
On January 28, 2011, Owen was inducted into the United States Figure Skating Hall of Fame as part of the 1961 U.S. World Team. Her sister Laurence Owen also was inducted and her mother Maribel Vinson Owen was inducted for a third time in 2011; in her capacity as a 1961 World Team Coach. Previously, her mother had been inducted in the inaugural Class of 1976 as a singles skater and for a second time in 1994 as a pairs skater.

In Winchester, the Vinson-Owen elementary school was named in her family's honor.

== Results ==
(pairs with Dudley Richards)

Event	1958	1959	1960	1961
Winter Olympics			10th	
World Championships		6th	10th	
North American Championships				2nd
U.S. Championships	3rd	3rd	2nd	1st

== See also ==
- Maribel Vinson
- Laurence Owen
- Guy Owen
- Sabena Flight 548
