= Patricia Dineen =

American ice dancer

- Patricia Dineen

Personal information
- Full name: Patricia Barbara Major Dineen
- Other names: Pat Dineen
- Born: July 10, 1935 New York City, New York, United States
- Died: February 15, 1961 (aged 25) Berg-Kampenhout, Flemish Brabant, Belgium
- Cause of death: Plane crash

Figure skating career
- Country: United States

Patricia Major Dineen (July 10, 1935 - February 15, 1961) was an American ice dancer who competed with her husband Robert Dineen. The duo won the Silver (Junior) dance title at the 1960 United States Figure Skating Championships and then the bronze at the senior level at the 1961 United States Figure Skating Championships, earning them the right to compete a month later at the World Championships in Prague. She and her husband died on February 15, 1961, when Sabena Flight 548 crashed en route to the World Championships. They left behind an infant son, Robert Jr., who was adopted by an uncle.

The Dineens lived in New York City where they were coached by Sonya Klopfer. Patricia Dineen had a high school education and worked as a clerk.

On January 28, 2011, Dineen was inducted into the United States Figure Skating Hall of Fame along with the entire 1961 U.S. World Team.

== Results ==
Ice Dance (with Dineen)

Event	1959	1960	1961
U.S. Championships	3rd J.	1st J.	3rd
