= Figure skating at the 1960 Winter Olympics =

Figure skating at the VIII Winter Olympics
- Type: Olympic Games
- Venue: Blyth Arena

Champions
- Men's singles: (United States) David Jenkins
- Ladies' singles: (United States) Carol Heiss
- Pairs: (Canada) Barbara Wagner / Robert Paul
- Previous: 1956 Winter Olympics
- Next: 1964 Winter Olympics

Figure skating at the 1960 Winter Olympics took place at the Blyth Arena in Squaw Valley, California, United States. Three figure skating events were contested: men's singles, ladies' singles and pair skating. It was the final time that figure skating at the Winter Olympics was conducted in a covered, but not enclosed, rink.

On February 15, 1961, the entire United States figure skating team and several family members, coaches, and officials were killed when Sabena Flight 548 crashed in Brussels, Belgium, en route to the World Championships in Prague. The accident caused the cancellation of the 1961 World Championships and necessitated the building of a new American skating program.

== Medalists ==
Event	Gold	Silver	Bronze
Men's singles	David Jenkins; United States	Karol Divín; Czechoslovakia	Donald Jackson; Canada
Ladies' singles	Carol Heiss; United States	Sjoukje Dijkstra; Netherlands	Barbara Roles; United States
Pair skating	Barbara Wagner / Robert Paul; Canada	Marika Kilius / Hans-Jürgen Bäumler; United Team of Germany	Nancy Ludington / Ronald Ludington; United States

== Medal table ==
Rank	Nation	Gold	Silver	Bronze	Total
1	United States	2	0	2	4
2	Canada	1	0	1	2
3	Czechoslovakia	0	1	0	1
3	Netherlands	0	1	0	1
3	United Team of Germany	0	1	0	1
Totals (5 entries)		3	3	3	9

== Participating nations ==
- Australia (6)
- Austria (6)
- Canada (8)
- Czechoslovakia (2)
- France (4)
- United Team of Germany (11)
- Great Britain (4)
- Italy (2)
- Japan (3)
- Netherlands (2)
- South Africa (4)
- Soviet Union (4)
- Switzerland (3)
- United States (12)
