= Pieter Kollen =

American figure skater and coach

Pieter Kollen (May 27, 1939—August 5, 2007) was an American figure skater and coach. In 1962 he won the U.S. Figure Skating Championships in pair skating with partner Dorothyann Nelson and also placed second in the ice dance competition at the same event. They placed 8th in pairs and 7th in dance at the 1962 World Figure Skating Championships.

The following season, following Nelson's retirement from competitive skating, Kollen competed in pairs with new partner Patti Gustafson. They placed 3rd at the US Championships and 9th at Worlds. They were the first pair team to perform the throw axel, which was invented by their coach Ronald Ludington.

For many years following his own competitive career, Kollen was a coach at the Indiana/World Skating Academy in Indianapolis, Indiana. He was the inventor of the "K-Pick"—an innovative skate blade design with the toe pick extended to the side of the blade.

Kollen died on August 5, 2007, and a memorial service was held at Circle Hill Cemetery in Angola, Indiana.

== Results ==
Pairs
(with Nelson)

Event	1961	1962
World Championships		8th
U.S. Championships	2nd J.	1st

Pairs
(with Gustafson)

Event	1963
World Championships	9th
U.S. Championships	3rd

Dance
(with Nelson)

Event	1960	1961	1962
World Championships			7th
U.S. Championships	3rd J.	3rd J.	2nd
