= Barbara Roles =

American figure skater

Personal information
- Full name: Barbara Ann Roles
- Other names: Barbara Ann Roles-Pursley; Barbara Roles Williams
- Born: April 6, 1941 (age 85) San Mateo, California, U.S.

Figure skating career
- Country: United States
- Skating club: Arctic Blades
- Retired: 1960, 1962
Medal record
Ladies' figure skating
Representing the United States
Olympic Games
Bronze medal – third place	1960 Squaw Valley	Ladies' singles
World Championships
Bronze medal – third place	1960 Vancouver	Ladies' singles

Barbara Ann Roles (married names: Pursley, Williams, born April 6, 1941) is an American former figure skater who currently works as a coach. She is the 1960 Olympic bronze medalist and the 1962 U.S. national champion.

== Personal life ==
Barbara Ann Roles is the daughter of Carl A. Roles. She married after retiring in 1960. Her daughter, Shelley Pursley Boatright, was born on June 24, 1961. In 1962, she gave birth to a son, Ronald Dean Pursley Chorak. She chose his middle name to honor her mentor, Deane McMinn, who died in the 1961 plane crash. She is the stepmother of U.S. skater Scott Williams.

== Career ==
Roles won the U.S. junior title in 1958. The next year, she won the senior bronze medal and was assigned to her first World Championships, where she placed fifth. After taking silver at the 1960 U.S. Championships, Roles was sent to the 1960 Winter Olympics and 1960 World Championships. She won the bronze medal at both competitions. She retired following that season and started a family.

Roles was asked to come out of retirement following the crash of Sabena Flight 548, which killed the entire 1961 U.S. figure skating team. She complied and won the gold medal at the 1962 U.S. Championships, making her the first skater to win U.S. national titles on the novice, junior and senior levels. Roles was the only skater to accomplish this until Kimmie Meisner performed the same feat in 2007. She missed the following season to give birth to her second child.

Roles returned to competition in an attempt to qualify for the 1964 Winter Olympics, but placed fifth at the national championships and failed to make the team. She took up coaching in 1964. Her pupils have included Lisa-Marie Allen, Wendy Burge, Nicole Bobek, Brian Pockar, Vikki DeVries, Geoffry Varner, and Scott Williams.

== Results ==
International
Event	1956	1958	1959	1960	1961	1962	1963	1964
Winter Olympics				3rd				
World Championships			5th	3rd		5th		
National
U.S. Championships	1st N.	1st J.	3rd	2nd		1st		5th
Levels: N. = Novice; J. = Junior
