= Rhode Lee Michelson =

American figure skater

- Rhode Lee Michelson at the U.S. National Figure Skating Competition in January 1961.

Personal information
- Born: March 9, 1943 Long Beach, California
- Died: February 15, 1961 (aged 17) Berg-Kampenhout, Flemish Brabant, Belgium
- Cause of death: Plane crash

Figure skating career
- Country: United States
- Skating club: Arctic Blades FSC

Rhode Lee Michelson (March 9, 1943 – February 15, 1961) was an American figure skater. She placed third at the 1961 U.S. Championships, earning her the chance to compete a month later at the World Championships. A hip injury forced Rhode to withdraw from the North American Championships in early February 1961. She was killed along with the entire 1961 United States Figure Skating team on February 15, 1961, when Sabena Flight 548 crashed near Brussels, Belgium, en route to the World Championships in Prague, Czechoslovakia. She was just 17 years old when she died.

== Background ==
Michelson. whose first name was pronounced RO-dee, grew up in California. She was the daughter of Arthur Michelson, a Lutheran, and Martha Michelson, who was Jewish. She attended neither church nor synagogue, but was interested in learning more about the two religions. After her death, the family was puzzled to find a crucifix among her possessions but speculated that it might have been given to Michelson by a friend with whom she had discussed comparative religions.

Michelson was the older sister of Wayne "Mike" Michelson (1946-2006), a national champion speed-skater, who recalled his sister as outgoing and assertive with an irrepressible smile and an irreverent sense of humor. Rhode Lee Michelson had also competed as a speed skater and, as a figure skater, was noted for her speed and athleticism. She was working on triple jumps during practice in 1960 well before other female figure skaters performed them in competitions. Her parents both worked to pay for their children's competitive skating.

Her death devastated the family. Her father died five years later. Her mother never recovered from the loss of her eldest child. Her brother, who had dreamed of competing at the 1964 Olympics alongside his older sister, gave up his own skating ambitions after her death.

On January 28, 2011, Michelson was inducted into the United States Figure Skating Hall of Fame as part of the 1961 U.S. World Team.

== Results ==
Event	1958	1959	1960	1961
North American Championships				WD
U.S. Championships	1st N.	3rd J.	2nd J.	3rd

- N. = novice, J. = junior
