= Broadmoor Skating Club =

Figure skating club in Colorado, United States

- Formation: 1939
- Headquarters: Colorado Springs World Arena
- Location: Colorado Springs, Colorado
- President: Kim Hennessy
- Website: broadmoorskatingclub.com

The Broadmoor Skating Club is a figure skating club based in Colorado Springs, Colorado, that has long been a major training center for the sport of figure skating. Founded in 1939, it was originally known as the Pikes Peak Skating Club, and was based in the Broadmoor World Arena on the grounds of The Broadmoor resort. When that facility was demolished in 1994, the club moved to its current home at the Broadmoor World Arena (1998).

Notable skaters who trained at or represented the Broadmoor Skating Club include:

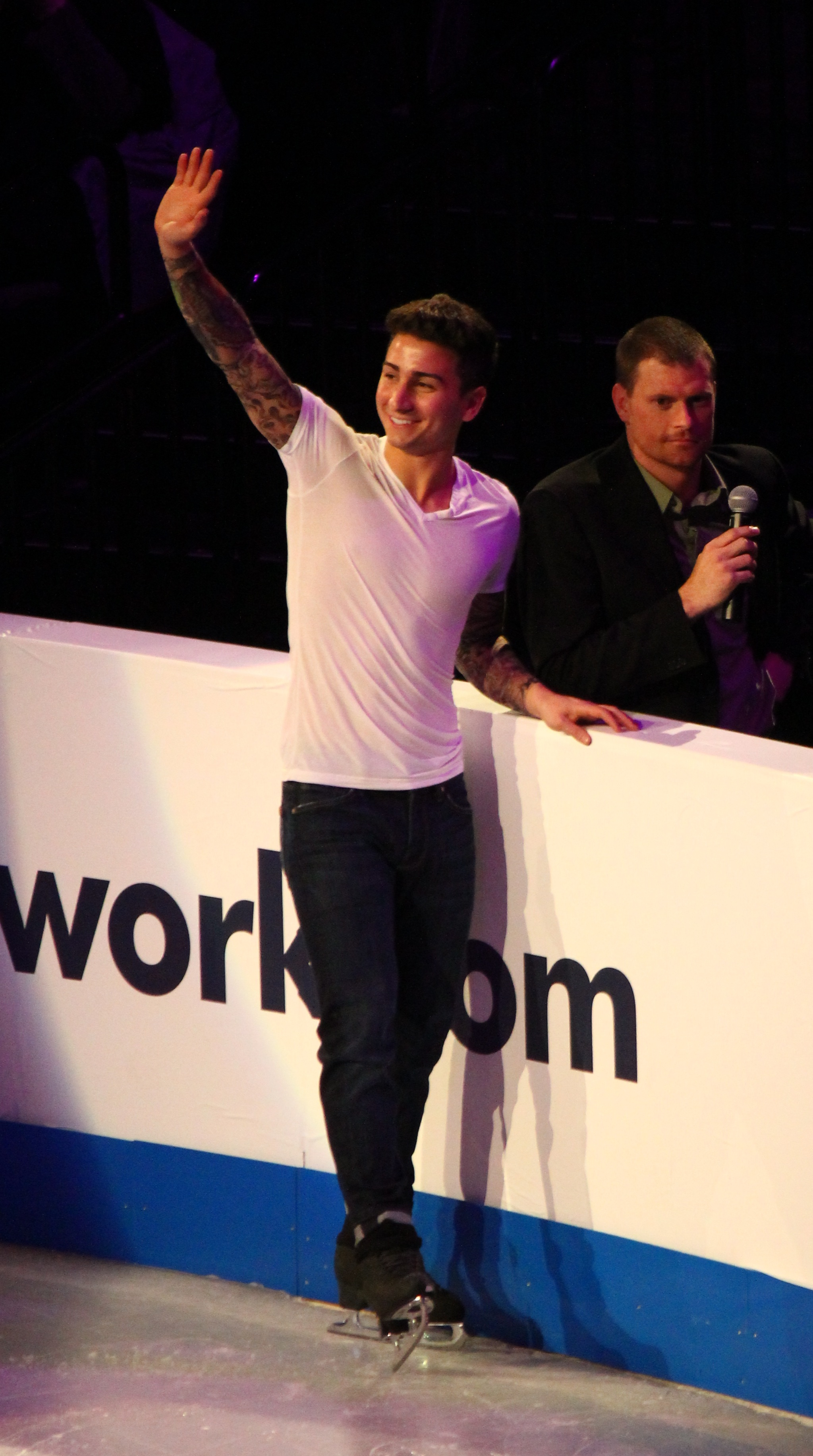
Max Aaron, 2013 US Men's Champion

- Max Aaron
- Mirai Nagasu
- Jeremy Abbott
- Ryan Bradley
- Vincent Zhou
- Nicole Bobek
- Scott Davis
- Todd Eldredge
- Rachael Flatt
- Peggy Fleming
- Isabella Flores & Dimitry Tsarevski
- Piper Gilles
- Ryan Jahnke
- David Jenkins
- Hayes Alan Jenkins
- Vivian Joseph & Ronald Joseph
- Caryn Kadavy
- Karol & Peter Kennedy
- Alexa Scimeca Knierim & Chris Knierim
- Ann Patrice McDonough
- Keauna McLaughlin & Rockne Brubaker
- Melissa & Mark Militano
- Brandon Mroz
- Colleen O'Connor and Jim Millns
- Renée Roca & Gorsha Sur
- Elizabeth Punsalan & Jerod Swallow
- Garrett Swasey
- Jill Trenary
- Tiffany Vise & Derek Trent
- Stephanie Westerfeld
- Tim Wood
- Paul Wylie
- Eva Pawlik
- Amber Glenn

Prominent coaches associated with the club have included Tom Dickson, Carlo Fassi, Sandy Hess, Edi Scholdan, Tom Zakrajsek, Janet Champion, Eddie Shipstad, and Tammy Gambill. The club has benefitted in recent years from its proximity to both the United States Figure Skating Association headquarters and the United States Olympic Training Center in Colorado Springs.

The club hosted the U.S. Figure Skating Championships six times between 1948 and 1976, and the World Figure Skating Championships five times during the same period, at the Broadmoor World Arena facility. More recently, the club has hosted events such as the World Junior Figure Skating Championships, the Four Continents Championships, Skate America, and the Grand Prix Final.
