= Stephanie Westerfeld =

American figure skater (1943–1961)

- Stephanie Westerfeld in 1961.

Personal information
- Born: October 8, 1943 Kansas City, Missouri, United States
- Died: February 15, 1961 (aged 17) Berg-Kampenhout, Flemish Brabant, Belgium
- Cause of death: Plane crash

Figure skating career
- Country: United States
- Skating club: Broadmoor Figure Skating Club

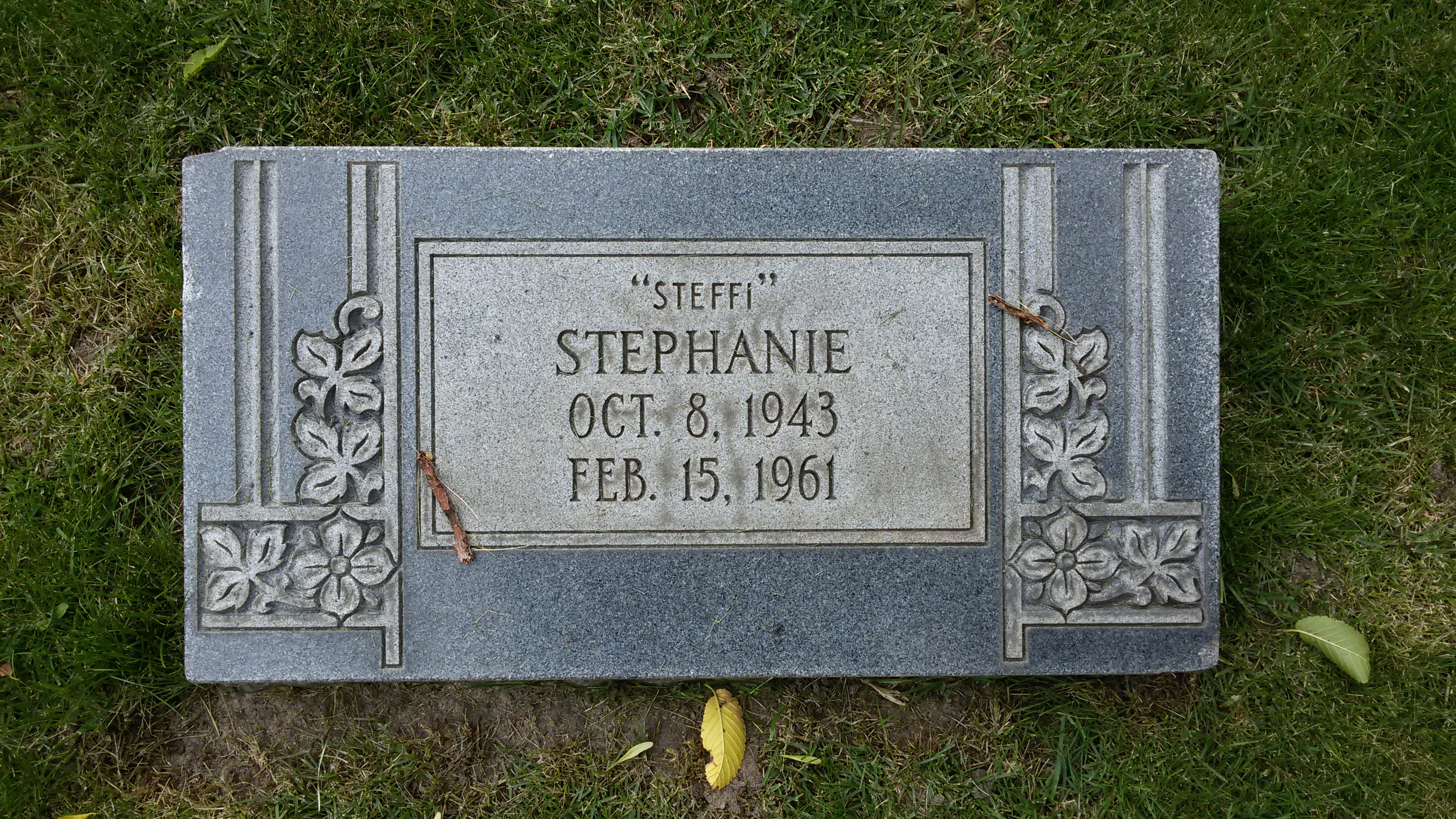
Grave of Stephanie Westerfeld

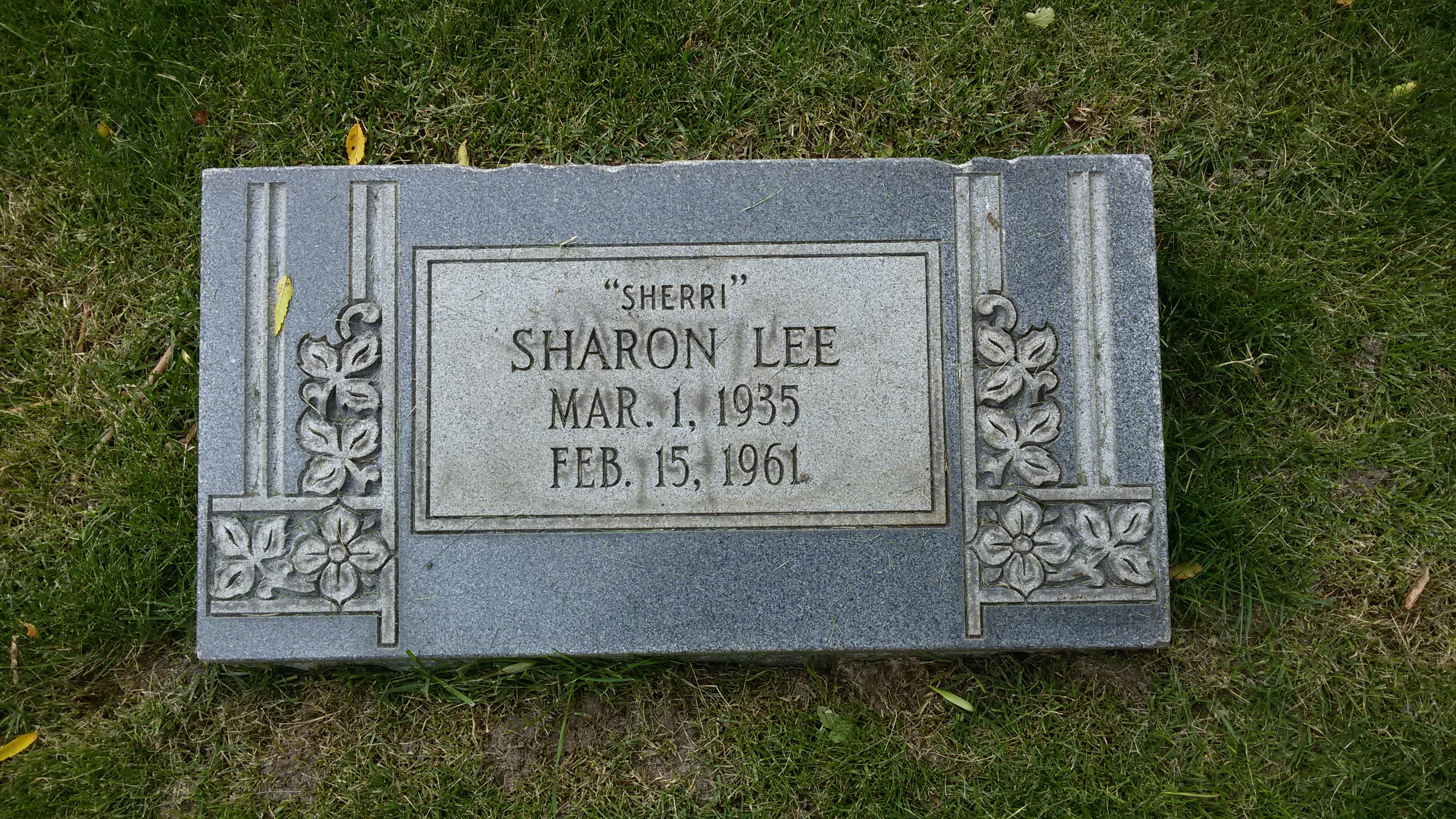
Grave of her sister Sharon

Stephanie "Steffi" Westerfeld (October 8, 1943 – February 15, 1961) was an American figure skater.

Stephanie was the younger daughter of Otto and Myra Westerfeld. Her older sister, Sharon, was also a competitive ice skater but had retired. Her mother moved with her daughters to Colorado Springs, Colorado to enable the girls to skate at the Broadmoor Figure Skating Club. Her father lived separately from the family and her parents divorced when Stephanie was a teenager. Her sister helped financially support the family and Stephanie's skating endeavors.

Stephanie earned a place on the United States' world team for the 1961 World Figure Skating Championships, after she finished second at 1961 U.S National Championships.

She died on February 15, 1961, when Sabena Flight 548 crashed on its way to the World Championships in Prague. She was buried in Evergreen Cemetery in Colorado Springs, Colorado. Her 25-year-old sister, Sharon, who had accompanied her as a chaperone, was also killed in the crash and is buried next to her in the family plot.

On January 28, 2011, Lord was inducted into the United States Figure Skating Hall of Fame as part of the 1961 U.S. World Team.

Westerfeld was an honor student, pianist, and homecoming queen at Cheyenne Mountain High School.

== Results ==
Event	1957	1958	1959	1960	1961
U.S. Championships	3rd J	2nd J	2nd J	4th	2nd
