= Ursel Barkey =

German figure skater

Personal information
- Nationality: German
- Born: 8 November 1941 (age 85) Cologne, Germany

Sport
- Sport: Figure skating

Ursel Barkey (born 8 November 1941) is a German figure skater. She competed in the women's singles event at the 1960 Winter Olympics.
