= Deane McMinn =

American figure skating judge and manager

Deane McMinn (1916– February 15, 1961) was a figure skating judge who was serving as team manager for the United States Figure Skating team attending the 1961 World Figure Skating Championships. He was killed along with all other members of the team in the crash of Sabena Flight 548 en route to the competition.

McMinn, who was born in Danforth, Maine and lived in Lomita, California, was a former ice dancer who competed at the regional and sectional level in the early 1950s. He judged at the 1960 Winter Olympics and 1961 North American Figure Skating Championships in addition to many competitions in the United States. For example, at the 1960 United States Figure Skating Championships, McMinn was on the judging panel for all four championship-level events.

On January 28, 2011, McMinn was inducted into the United States Figure Skating Hall of Fame along with the entire 1961 World Team.
