= Sandra Tewkesbury =

Canadian figure skater

Sandra Tewkesbury (February 14, 1942 – June 5, 1962) was a Canadian figure skater who competed in ladies singles. Tewkesbury was born in Chatham, Ontario. She won the bronze medal at the 1959 Canadian Figure Skating Championships and competed at the 1960 Winter Olympics.

She died following a car accident in Guelph in June 1962.

== Results ==
Competition	1955	1956	1957	1958	1959	1960
Winter Olympic Games						10th
World Championships					10th	
Canadian Championships	9th J	4th J	3rd J	4th	3rd	5th
