= Dudley Richards =

American figure skater

- Dudley Richards is pictured on February 14, 1961 before boarding Sabena Flight 548 at Idlewild Airport in New York City.

Personal information
- Born: Dudley Shaw Richards; February 4, 1932 Providence, Rhode Island, United States
- Died: February 15, 1961 (aged 29) Berg-Kampenhout, Flemish Brabant, Belgium
- Cause of death: Plane crash
- Height: 5’10”

Figure skating career
- Country: United States
- Partner: Maribel Y. Owen
- Coach: Maribel Vinson
- Skating club: SC of Boston
Medal record
Representing United States
Pairs' Figure skating
North American Championships
Silver medal – second place	1961 Philadelphia	Pairs

Dudley "Dud" Shaw Richards (February 4, 1932 – February 15, 1961) was an American figure skater who competed in men's singles and pairs. In singles, he won the bronze medal at the 1953 United States Figure Skating Championships and finished sixth at that year's World Figure Skating Championships. In pairs, he once skated with future Olympic gold medalist Tenley Albright, before later teaming up with Maribel Owen. After winning the bronze medal at Nationals in 1958 and 1959, the pair captured the silver in 1960 and finished tenth at that year's Winter Olympic Games. In 1961, Owen and Richards won the gold medal at the U.S. Championships and finished second at the North American Figure Skating Championships.

As a skater, Richards was described as handsome, elegant and charismatic. At the time, ice skating had associations with wealth and privilege and male figure skaters wore formal attire and were seen as ballroom dancers on ice. Handsome Richards personified this ideal.

== Background ==
Richards was the son of Byron Richards Jr. and Ruth Ross Richards. He grew up in Pawtucket, Rhode Island, where he began skating on a local pond with other children in the neighborhood. He joined the Providence Figure Skating Club and began entering skating competitions at age nine. When he was eleven or twelve, he took the train to Boston to take lessons at the Skating Club of Boston. His drive to skate was innate and unprompted by his socially privileged family, who wondered why he was so interested in the sport.

He attended Providence Country Day School in Providence, Rhode Island, and graduated at seventeen. He then completed a post-graduate year at Belmont Hill School in Belmont, Massachusetts, where he was captain of the sailing team and led his team to victory as skipper of the sailboat in a sailing competition for students at schools in the Eastern United States. He was a longtime friend and former college roommate at Harvard University of Senator Ted Kennedy, with whom he enjoyed sailing during summers spent in Hyannis Port, Massachusetts when they were boys. Kennedy admired Richards' discipline. Richards got up at 4:30 a.m. every morning to go to the skating rink for practice. When he was 17, Richards broke his neck diving off a pier while rough housing with other boys and spent five years recovering, though he resumed competitive skating with Albright as his partner the year after the accident.

Richards escorted Albright, who was three and a half years his junior, to a dance at Harvard when she was 14 and taught her how to drive. Their skating partnership ended abruptly when Richards "hit a rut during a toss" while they ran through a skating routine and Albright fell and lost consciousness. Albright's father refused to let her continue as a pairs skater and told Richards and Albright to focus on skating individually. Both Albright and Richards were later successful as singles skaters, but Richards preferred pairs skating.

Richards finished third in the men's singles division at a competition that determined which American skaters would compete at the 1952 Winter Olympics in Oslo, Norway. Only the first and second-place winners, James Grogan and Hayes Alan Jenkins, qualified to compete since Dick Button, the 1948 national champion, had already qualified for the Olympics. Richards lost his chance to compete at the 1952 Olympics, which had been one of his dreams. In 1953, after Button turned professional, Richards qualified to compete in the men's singles division at the world figure skating championships in Switzerland.

In May 1951, Ted Kennedy asked Richards to help him cheat on a Spanish exam by taking the exam for Kennedy. Richards refused to cheat and Kennedy persuaded another classmate to take the exam. Both Kennedy and the student he had persuaded to take the Spanish exam for him were caught and were asked to withdraw from Harvard, though they were told they could later reapply for admission. Richards graduated from Harvard, where he majored in history, in 1954 and then spent two years in the U.S. Army. He was stationed in Garmisch, West Germany and skated at a nightclub for $50 per night. The Army also taught Richards how to help people defect. He was able to make arrangements for one or two people to defect during his time in the Army.

When he was discharged from the Army, he later worked as a real estate executive, first for Nordblom and then for Honeywell, which was located next to the Skating Club of Boston. He worked as a writer for the company. He continued pairs skating in his mid-twenties because he wanted to compete in the Olympics. Richards, a Republican, voted for Richard Nixon in the 1960 United States presidential election but could not resist John F. Kennedy's invitation to visit the Kennedy compound in Hyannis Port on election night on November 8, 1960. Richards also attended the opening of a skating rink at Hyannis Port that was sponsored by the Kennedy family.

Richards was friendly, kind, and made other people feel included. He was also attractive to beautiful women. On one Christmas Eve, Richards and his good friend, Ron Ludington, set up a Christmas tree at the Vinson-Owen household because they knew Maribel Vinson would not have made time to decorate for Christmas. Vinson, her mother and daughters enjoyed decorating the tree but left it standing until the following April, when Richards and Ludington returned to remove it because it had become a fire hazard. His relationship off the ice with Owen developed into a romance during their final months. Friends noted the way they held hands and how they gazed at one another. Richards' sister said his family noticed the amount of time Richards spent with Owen and saw the romantic attraction between them, even though Owen was much younger than Richards. His sister believed that Richards and Owen would have retired from skating soon after the world competition if they had lived. Richards had just turned 29 and his family believed it was time for him to focus on things other than skating. Richards had planned to propose marriage to Owen after the World Championships in Prague.

Richards was en route to the world competition when the plane he was on, Sabena Flight 548, crashed near Brussels, Belgium, on the morning of February 15, 1961, killing all on board including the entire U.S. figure skating team. He was 29 at the time of his death.

After the crash, Richards was identified by the Saint Christopher medal he wore around his neck. His friend from Harvard, Fred Heller, who was in Europe at the time, recognized the medal he had given Richards after the baptism of one of his sons and which Richards always wore in recognition of the honor of becoming the godfather to Heller's sons. Richards was a Congregationalist.

A memorial service for Richards was held in Barrington, Rhode Island. He was interred at Swan Point Cemetery in Providence, Rhode Island.

== Legacy ==
In 1962, Richards' brother, Ross Richards, established the Dudley Shaw Richards Memorial Award to help aspiring figure skaters at the Providence Figure Skating Club in Rhode Island. The Dudley S. Richards Memorial Ice Skating Rink opened in Providence in 1969 and remained open until 1979, when it was sold to United Skates of America, which operated roller skating rinks.

On January 28, 2011, Richards was inducted into the United States Figure Skating Hall of Fame as part of the 1961 U.S. World Team.

== Results ==
(men's singles)

Event	1947	1949	1950	1951	1952	1953
World Championships				5th	5th	6th
U.S. Championships	2nd J	3rd J	4th J	1st J	4th	3rd

(pairs with Maribel Owen)

Event	1958	1959	1960	1961
Winter Olympics			10th	
World Championships			10th	
North American Championships				2nd
U.S. Championships	3rd	3rd	2nd	1st
