= Bärbel Martin =

German figure skater (born 1940)

Personal information
- Full name: Barbara Martin
- Born: 10 November 1940 (age 85)

Figure skating career
- Country: West Germany
- Skating club: Hamburger Eislaufverein
- Retired: 1961

Barbara "Bärbel" Martin (born 10 November 1940) is a German former figure skater who represented West Germany. A member of Hamburger EV, she won the 1960 national title and competed at the 1960 Winter Olympics in Squaw Valley, finishing 14th. She also appeared at the World and European Championships. She turned professional in 1961.

== Competitive highlights ==
International
Event	1959	1960	1961
Winter Olympics		14th	
World Championships		17th	
European Championships	17th	15th	
National
German Championships	2nd	1st	2nd
