= Robert Dineen =

American ice dancer (1937–1961)

Robert Francis Dineen (July 8, 1937 - February 15, 1961) was an American ice dancer who competed with his wife Patricia Dineen. The duo won Silver (Junior) dance title at the 1960 United States Figure Skating Championships and then the bronze in the senior division at the 1961 United States Figure Skating Championships, earning them the right to compete a month later at the World Championships in Prague. He and his wife died on February 15, 1961, when Sabena Flight 548 crashed en route to the World Championships. They left behind an infant son, Robert Jr., who was adopted by Dineen's brother.

Dineen was a graduate of St. John's University and had plans to return to school to study law. The Dineens lived in New York City where they were trained by Sonya Klopfer.

On January 28, 2011, Dineen was inducted into the United States Figure Skating Hall of Fame as part of the 1961 U.S. World Team.

== Results ==
Ice Dance (with Dineen)

| Event | 1959 | 1960 | 1961 |
|---|---|---|---|
| U.S. Championships | 3rd J. | 1st J. | 3rd |
