= Dorothyann Nelson =

American figure skater

Dorothyann Nelson is a former American figure skater. She skated with partner Pieter Kollen. Together they were the champions in pair skating at the 1962 United States Figure Skating Championships and also won the silver medal in ice dance at the same event. Nelson retired from competition in 1962 in order to skate professionally with Ice Follies.

== Results ==
Pairs
(with Kollen)

Event	1961	1962
World Championships		8th
U.S. Championships	2nd J.	1st

Dance
(with Kollen)

Event	1960	1961	1962
World Championships			7th
U.S. Championships	3rd J.	3rd J.	2nd
