= Bradley Lord (figure skater) =

American figure skater

Personal information
- Born: August 22, 1939
- Died: February 15, 1961 (aged 21) Berg, Belgium
- Cause of death: Plane crash
Medal record
Representing United States
Men's Figure skating
North American Championships
Silver medal – second place	1961 Philadelphia	Men's singles

Bradley Lord (August 22, 1939 – February 15, 1961) was an American figure skater who competed in men's singles. He finished fourth at the 1960 United States Figure Skating Championships and then placed sixth at that year's World Figure Skating Championships after the top three U.S. skaters skipped the event. The following year, he won the gold medal at the 1961 United States Figure Skating Championships and placed second at the 1961 North American Figure Skating Championships.

Lord was en route to the World Championships in 1961 when his plane (Sabena Flight 548) crashed near Brussels, Belgium, killing all on board.

Lord trained with coach Montgomery Wilson at the Skating Club of Boston. Away from the ice, Lord attended Boston University and wanted to pursue a career in commercial art.

On January 28, 2011, Lord was inducted into the United States Figure Skating Hall of Fame as part of the 1961 U.S. World Team.

== Results ==
Event	1956	1957	1958	1959	1960	1961
World Championships				8th	6th	
North American Championships						2nd
U.S. Championships	2nd J	1st J	5th	4th	4th	1st
