= Ronald Ludington =

American figure skating coach (1934–2020)

Personal information
- Full name: Ronald Edmund Ludington
- Born: September 4, 1934 Boston, Massachusetts
- Died: May 14, 2020 (aged 85) Newark, Delaware

Figure skating career
- Country: United States
- Skating club: Commonwealth Figure Skating Club
- Retired: 1960
Medal record
Representing United States
Pairs' Figure skating
Olympic Games
Bronze medal – third place	1960 Squaw Valley	Pairs
World Championships
Bronze medal – third place	1959 Colorado Springs	Pairs
North American Championships
Bronze medal – third place	1957 Rochester	Pairs

Ronald Ludington (September 4, 1934 – May 14, 2020) was an American figure skating coach and pair skater. With Nancy Rouillard Ludington, he was the 1960 Olympic bronze medalist, 1959 World bronze medalist, and a four-time U.S. national champion.

== Career ==
With his then-wife, Nancy Rouillard Ludington, he won the U.S. Championships in pair skating four times, between 1957 and 1960, after having been the junior national champions in 1956. They won bronze medals at the 1959 World Figure Skating Championships and 1960 Winter Olympics. Ludington also won the 1958 U.S. junior (silver) dance championship, partnered with Judy Ann Lamar.

Following his competitive career, Ludington took up coaching in Norwalk, Connecticut. His first pupils included Patricia and Robert Dineen, who were killed along with the rest of the U.S. team in the crash of Sabena Flight 548 on their way to the 1961 World Championships. Ludington was not on the plane because neither he nor the Dineens had the money to fund his travel expenses. It was the only World Championships from 1957 to the end of the century which he did not attend as either a competitor or a coach.

Around 1970, due to limited ice time in Detroit, Ludington moved to Wilmington, Delaware to coach at the Skating Club of Wilmington. In 1987, he became the director of the University of Delaware's Ice Skating Science Development Center. He held that position until 2010.

Ludington coached the following skaters:

- Cozette Cady / Jack Courtney, US national pair bronze medalists
- Kitty Carruthers / Peter Carruthers, pairs silver medalists at the 1984 Winter Olympics
- John Coughlin (1985–2019)
- Carol Fox / Richard Dalley, ice dancers at the 1984 Olympics
- Gale Fuhrman / Joel Fuhrman, US national pair silver medalists
- Melissa Militano / Johnny Johns, U.S. national pair champions
- Lea Ann Miller / William Fauver
- Kim Seybold / Wayne Seybold
- Stacey Smith / John Summers, three-time U.S. national champion ice dancers
- Calla Urbanski / Rocky Marval
- (Lisa Spitz / Scott Gregory 1984 Ice dancers Olympics. Three time world competitors.
- (Suzanne Semanick / Scott Gregory 1987, 1988 National Senior Dance Champions, 5th 1987 World Championships, 6th 1988 Olympics.
- Karen Courtland / Todd Reynolds, two-time US National Pair Bronze Medalists, 1993 US Olympic Festival Champions, 14th 1994 Olympics

Ludington was named to the Delaware Sports Museum and Hall of Fame in 2000, the Professional Skaters Association Coaches Hall of Fame in 2002, and the World Figure Skating Hall of Fame in 1999.

== Personal life ==
In 1957, Ludington married his skating partner, Nancy Rouillard. He later married Mary Batdorf, a skating coach. They had a son, Michael, before divorcing in the mid-1970s. Ludington wed his third wife, Karen, a professional skater. The marriage ended in divorce in 2011. Ludington died on May 14, 2020, at the age of 85.

== Results ==
=== Pairs ===
(with Nancy Ludington)

Event	1957	1958	1959	1960
Winter Olympic Games				3rd
World Championships	4th	5th	3rd	6th
North American Championships	3rd			
U.S. Championships	1st	1st	1st	1st

=== Ice dance ===
(with Lamar)

Event	1958
U.S. Championships	1st J.
