= Charles Phillips (figure skater) =

American ice dancer

Charles Phillips (born 1938) was an American ice dancer. Competing with Margie Ackles, he won the gold medal at the 1960 U.S. Figure Skating Championships.

Phillips lived in Hollywood and was a 1957 graduate of UCLA. He and Ackles were coached by William Kipp. In addition to competing with Ackles, Phillips won the U.S. silver (Junior) dance title with Aileen Kahre in 1956.

== Results ==
=== Ice dance ===
(with Kahre)

Event	1956
U.S. Championships	2nd J.

(with Ackles)

Event	1958	1959	1960
World Championships		4th	4th
U.S. Championships	4th	2nd	1st
