= Sabena Flight 548 =

1961 fatal crash of a Boeing 707 in Belgium

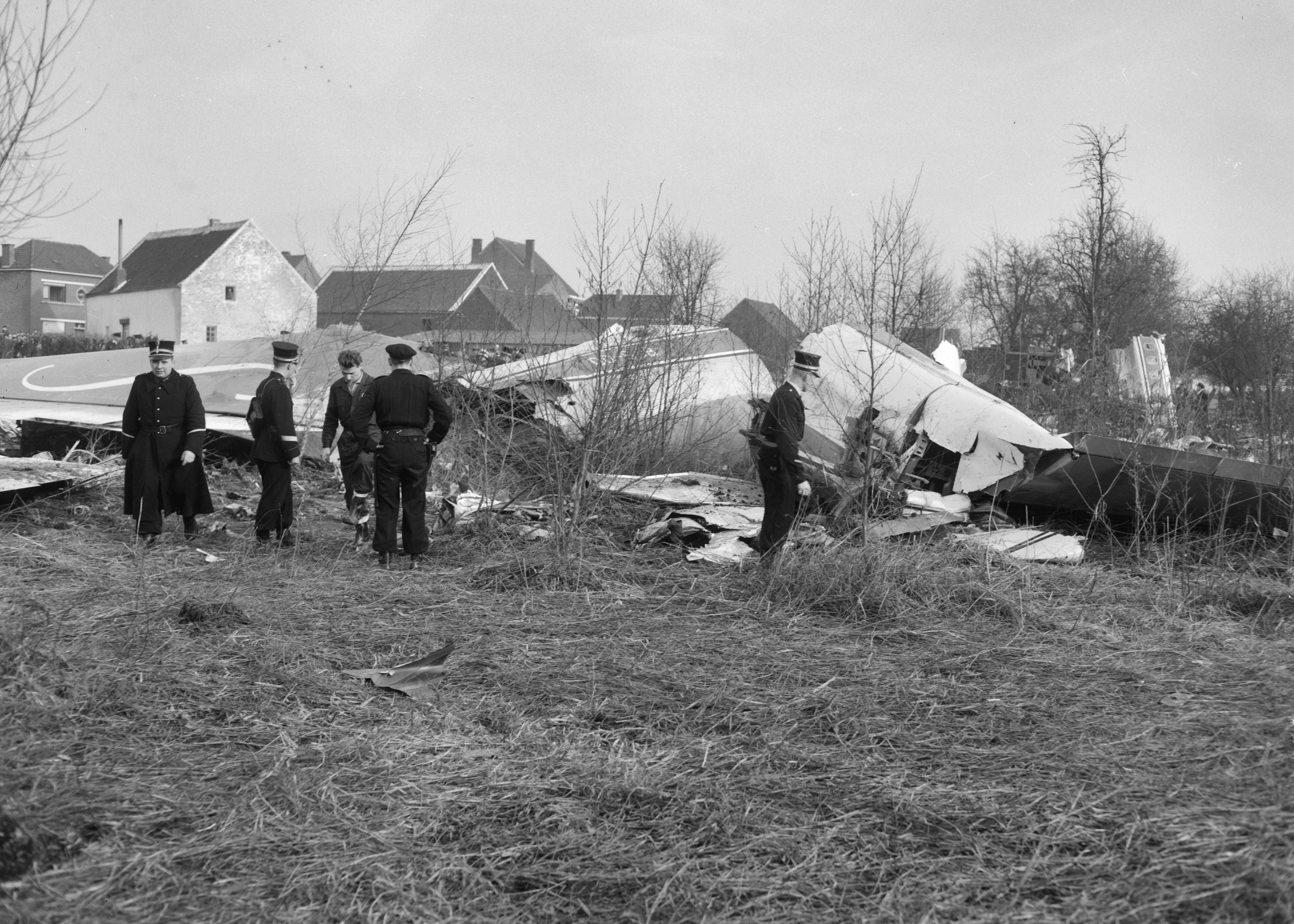
- Crash site and debris

Accident
- Date: 15 February 1961
- Summary: Loss of control for undetermined reasons (possible mechanical failure)
- Site: Kampenhout, near Brussels Airport, Belgium; 50.9209°N 4.5268°E
- Total fatalities: 73
- Total injuries: 1

Aircraft
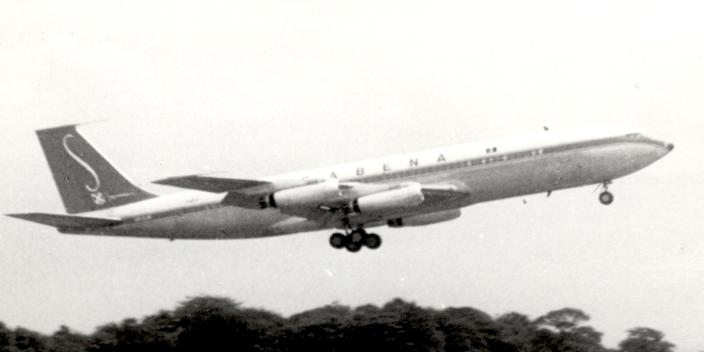
- OO-SJB, the aircraft involved in the accident, at Manchester Airport on 28 May 1960
- Aircraft type: Boeing 707-329
- Operator: Sabena
- IATA flight No.: SN548
- ICAO flight No.: SAB548
- Call sign: SABENA 548
- Registration: OO-SJB
- Flight origin: Idlewild Airport, New York
- Destination: Brussels Airport, Zaventem
- Occupants: 72
- Passengers: 61
- Crew: 11
- Fatalities: 72
- Survivors: 0

Ground casualties
- Ground fatalities: 1
- Ground injuries: 1

The U.S. Figure Skating Team just before boarding at Idlewild Airport in New York City. Front: team manager Deane McMinn, 44; Laurence Owen, 16; Douglas Ramsay, 16; Stephanie Westerfeld, 17; Gregory Kelley, 16; Rhode Lee Michelson, 17; Bradley Lord, 21. First step: Maribel Owen, 20; Dudley Richards, 29. Second step: William Hickox, 18; Ray Hadley Jr., 17. Third step: Laurie Hickox, 15; Larry Pierce, 24; Ila Ray Hadley, 18. Fourth row: Roger Campbell, 18; Diane Sherbloom, 18. At rear: Dona Lee Carrier, 20; Robert Dineen, 24; Patricia Dineen, 25.

Sabena Flight 548 was a scheduled international passenger flight from Idlewild Airport in New York City to Brussels Airport in Belgium. On 15 February 1961, the Boeing 707 operating the flight crashed on approach to Brussels Airport, killing all 72 people on board and one person on the ground. The fatalities included the entire United States figure skating team, which was traveling to the World Figure Skating Championships in Prague, Czechoslovakia. The precise cause of the crash remains unknown; the most likely explanation was thought to be a failure of the mechanism that adjusts the tail stabilizer.

This was the first fatal accident involving a Boeing 707 in regular passenger service; it happened 28 months after the 707 airliner had been placed into commercial use. (Note: The first passenger flight of the Boeing 707 was in October 1958. Three 707s had crashed previously during training or test flights.) It remains the deadliest plane crash to have occurred on Belgian soil.

== Accident ==
There were 11 crew members on board the flight. The two pilots, 43-year-old Louis Lambrechts (15,384 flight hours) and 48-year-old Jean Roy (16,231 flight hours), were both former military pilots. There were no difficulties reported during the seven-and-one-half hour transatlantic flight from New York, although the flight crew lost radio contact with the Brussels airport about 20 minutes before approaching to land.

Under clear skies, at about 10:00 Brussels time (CET; 09:00 UTC), the Boeing 707 was on a long approach to Runway 20 when, near the runway threshold and at a height of 900 feet (270 m), power was increased and the landing gear retracted. The airplane had been forced to cancel its final approach, as a small plane had not yet cleared the runway. The 707 circled the airport and again attempted to land on the adjoining Runway 25, which was not operational, but this second approach was also aborted. Witnesses observed that the pilots were fighting for control of the aircraft, attempting to land despite a mechanical malfunction preventing a normal landing. The plane circled the airfield three times altogether, and the plane's bank angle gradually increased until the aircraft had climbed to 1,500 feet (460 m) and was in a near vertical bank. It then leveled its wings, pitched up abruptly, lost speed and spiraled rapidly, nose-down, plunging into the ground less than two miles (3 km) from the airport at 10:05 CET (09:05 UTC).

The plane crashed in a marshy area adjacent to farmland near Berg, four miles northeast of Brussels. Eyewitnesses said that the plane exploded and burst into flames. A farmer working nearby was killed by flying debris, which also struck a second worker, whose leg was subsequently partially amputated. Airport rescue vehicles arrived at the crash site almost immediately, but the plane was already engulfed in flames.

Baudouin I, King of the Belgians, and his consort Queen Fabiola traveled to the scene of the disaster to provide comfort to the bereaved families. They donated oak coffins bearing the royal seal to transport the bodies back to their homes.

== Loss of American figure skating team ==
All 18 members of the 1961 American figure skating team, traveling to the World Figure Skating Championships in Prague, were killed, as well as 16 others who were accompanying them, including family members, coaches and skating officials. Among the fatalities were nine-time U.S. ladies' champion-turned-coach Maribel Vinson-Owen and her two daughters: reigning U.S. ladies' champion Laurence Owen, age 16, and her 20-year-old sister, reigning U.S. pairs champion Maribel Owen. Both had won gold medals at the 1961 U.S. Figure Skating Championships in Colorado Springs, Colorado, just two weeks earlier. Laurence Owen appeared on the cover of the 13 February issue of Sports Illustrated just two days before her death.

Maribel Owen's pairs champion partner Dudley Richards and reigning U.S. men's champion Bradley Lord were also killed, along with U.S. ice dance champions Diane Sherbloom and Larry Pierce. Also killed were U.S. men's silver medalist Gregory Kelley, U.S. ladies' silver medalist Stephanie Westerfeld and U.S. ladies' bronze medalist Rhode Lee Michelson.

Some national teams had already arrived in Prague. The competition's organizers initially confirmed that the event would proceed, but the International Skating Union conducted a poll on 16 February regarding the most appropriate course of action, and the voters elected to cancel the event. A telegram was sent from ISU headquarters reading: "In view of the tragic death of 44 [sic] American skaters and officials the 1961 world championship will not be held." Prague was awarded the event for the following year.

== Aftermath ==
The figure skating team was mourned across the U.S., and national newspapers carried the story on front pages.

In office for less than a month, President John F. Kennedy issued a statement of condolence from the White House reading: "Our country has sustained a great loss of talent and grace which had brought pleasure to people all over the world. Mrs. Kennedy and I extend our deepest sympathy to the families and friends of all the passengers and crew who died in this crash." Kennedy was personally affected by the tragedy, as pairs skater Dudley Richards was a friend with whom he had spent summers in Hyannis Port, Massachusetts.

The disaster struck a severe blow to the American figure skating program, which had dominated the sport throughout the 1950s. Frank Shumway, who had recently become vice president of U.S. Figure Skating, predicted that it would take as long as four years for the U.S. to regain its world prominence in the sport.

Barbara Roles, the 1960 Olympic bronze medalist, felt obligated to abandon her retirement and won a gold medal at the 1962 U.S. Championships, less than eight months after giving birth to her first child. Some of the younger American figure skaters progressed more quickly than usual given the lack of senior skaters competing in the field. Scott Allen won a silver medal at the 1962 U.S. Championships when he was just 12 years old, and then won a bronze medal at the 1964 Winter Olympics the week of his 15th birthday, becoming one of the youngest Olympic medalists in history. It was not until 1965 that the U.S. began to win medals at the World Championships again, and the U.S. did not regain international prominence in figure skating until the 1968 Winter Olympics when Peggy Fleming won gold in the ladies' event and Tim Wood won silver in the men's.

As the fatalities included many top American coaches as well as the skating team, the tragedy was also indirectly responsible for bringing foreign coaches to the U.S. to fill the vacuum that was left behind. U.S. team coach William Kipp, who was killed in the crash, was replaced by British former world champion pairs skater John Nicks in the fall of 1961. Italian world bronze medalist Carlo Fassi also relocated from overseas to help rebuild the American figure skating program.

The disaster prompted U.S. Figure Skating executives to issue a mandate that still applies today: no team traveling to an international competition is permitted to fly together.

== Investigation ==
The Belgian government immediately ordered a full inquiry into the cause of the accident, and an investigation was conducted by the Belgian national authorities, the United States Federal Aviation Administration (FAA) and the International Civil Aviation Organization (ICAO). Investigators spent several months examining the evidence. The FBI reportedly considered the possibility of terrorism.

The exact cause of the crash was never fully determined, but the authorities eventually agreed that the most likely explanation was a mechanical failure of one of the flight-control mechanisms, probably a malfunction of either the wing spoilers or the tail stabilizers. Although there was insufficient evidence to prove beyond reasonable doubt which of the flight systems had malfunctioned, the FAA felt that the tail stabilizer-adjusting mechanism had failed, allowing the stabilizer to run to the "10.5deg nose-up position."

== Notable victims ==
A total of 34 members of the U.S. figure skating delegation were aboard the flight, almost half the plane's occupants. The 18 figure skaters were accompanied by six coaches, the team manager, two judges, one referee, and six family members.

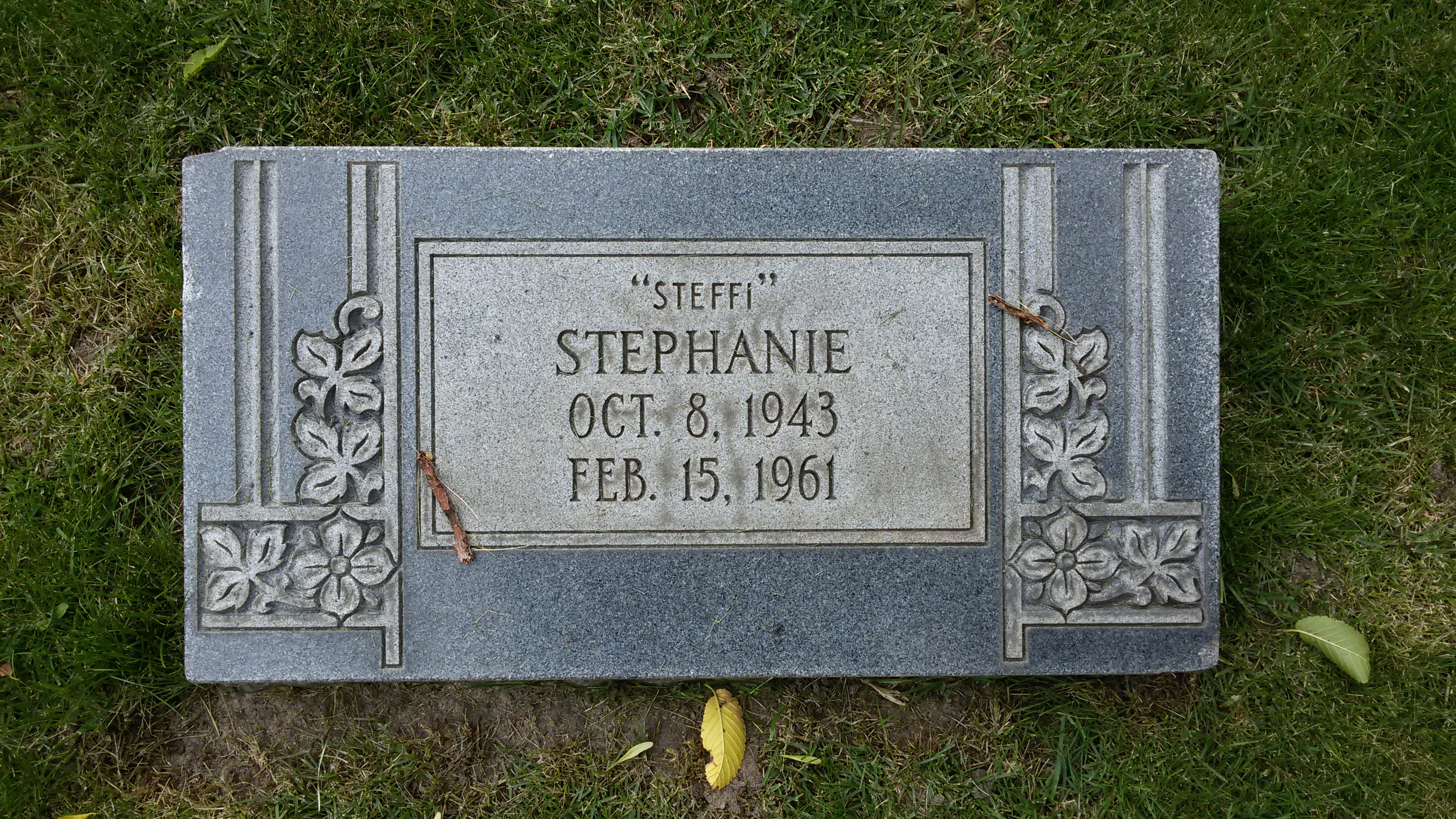
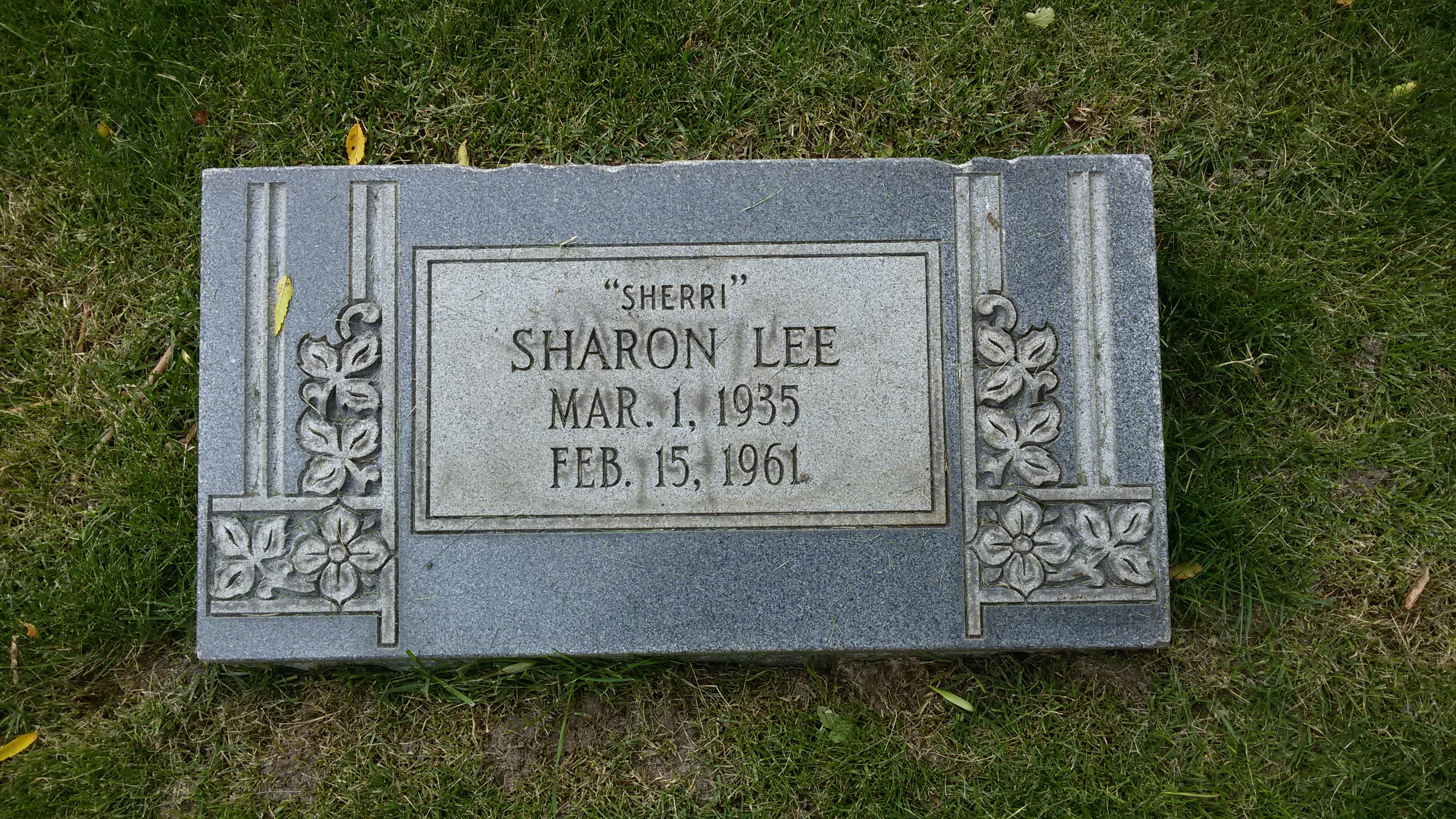
Graves of Stephanie Westerfeld and her sister Sharon in Evergreen Cemetery (Colorado Springs, Colorado); both were on board Sabena Flight 548.

Women

- Rhode Lee Michelson (age 17), 1961 U.S. bronze medalist
- Laurence Rochon Owen (age 16), 1961 U.S. and North American champion, 1960 Olympic and World team member
- Stephanie Westerfeld (age 17), 1961 U.S. silver medalist

Men

- Gregory Kelley (age 16), 1961 U.S. silver medalist, 1961 North American bronze medalist, 1960 World team member
- Bradley Lord (age 21), 1961 U.S. champion, 1961 North American silver medalist, 1959 World team member
- Douglas Ramsay (age 16), 1961 U.S. Championships fourth-place medalist

Pairs skaters

- Ila Ray Hadley (age 18) / Ray Ellis Hadley Jr. (age 17), 1960 Olympic and World team members, 1961 U.S. pairs silver medalists
- Laurie Hickox (age 15) / William Holmes Hickox (age 18), 1961 U.S. pairs bronze medalists
- Maribel Yerxa Owen (age 20) / Dudley Shaw Richards (age 29), 1960 Olympic team members, 1961 U.S. pairs champions, 1961 North American silver medalists

Ice dancers

- Dona Lee Carrier (age 20) / Roger Campbell (age 18), 1961 U.S. and North American silver medalists
- Patricia Major Dineen (age 25) / Robert Dineen (age 23), 1961 U.S. bronze medalists
- Diane Carol Sherbloom (age 18) / Larry Pierce (age 24), 1961 U.S. champions

Coaches

- Daniel Ryan
- Eduard "Edi" Scholdan
- Maribel Yerxa Vinson-Owen

Judges

- Harold Hartshorne
- Edward LeMaire

Others

- U.S. team manager Deane McMinn
- Referee Walter S. Powell

== Legacy ==
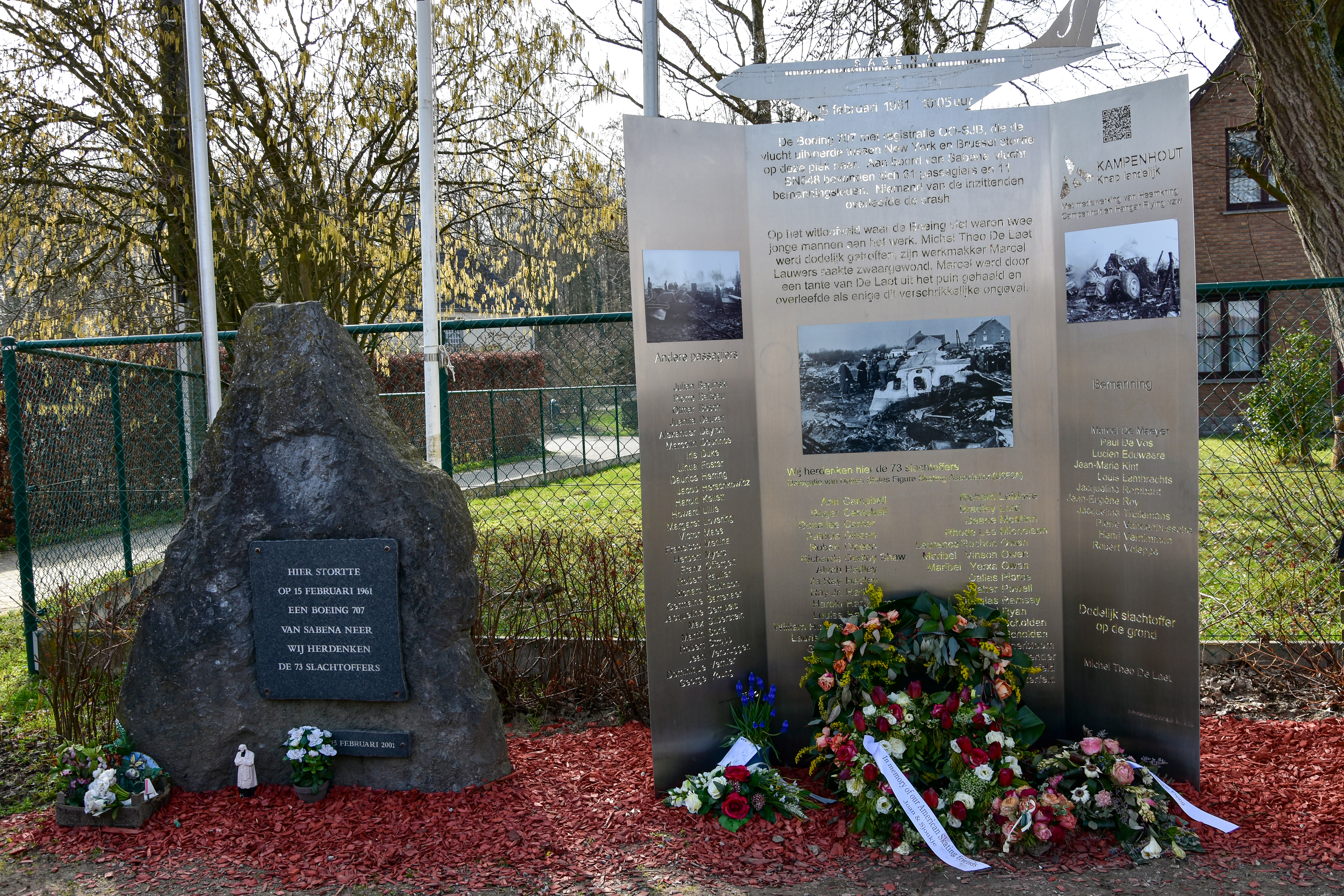
Memorial at location of the crash

Within days of the tragedy, the U.S. Figure Skating Executive Committee established the 1961 U.S. Figure Skating Memorial Fund to honor the 18 team members and their entourage who died in the crash. The fund's mission was to help rebuild the U.S. figure skating program by providing financial support for promising young skaters. In March 1961, a benefit was held at Boston Garden to raise money for the fund. Among the fund's first beneficiaries was 12-year-old Peggy Fleming, whose coach William Kipp had died in the crash. Fleming won the gold medal at the 1968 Winter Olympics.

The 40th anniversary of the crash was marked by the 10 February 2001 unveiling of a five-foot-high (1.5 m) stone monument in Berg-Kampenhout, close to the scene of the tragedy.

In 2009, U.S. Figure Skating commissioned the production of a full-length feature documentary film titled RISE to commemorate the 50th anniversary of the crash. RISE was shown in American theaters on 17 February and 7 March 2011. Proceeds from the film were donated to the U.S. Figure Skating Memorial Fund. The film was aired on the Versus television network on 22 October 2011.

In January 2011, the members of the 1961 U.S. figure skating team were inducted into the U.S. Skating Hall of Fame in a special ceremony at the 2011 U.S. Figure Skating Championships in Greensboro, North Carolina. All 18 team members were inducted, along with the six coaches: Linda Hadley, William Kipp, Maribel Vinson-Owen, Daniel Ryan, Edi Scholdan and William Swallender.

Vinson-Owen Elementary School in Winchester, Massachusetts, is named in honor of Vinson-Owen and her two daughters who died in the accident. It ranks consistently among the top schools in Greater Boston.

== See also ==
- List of accidents involving sports teams
  - 2025 Potomac River mid-air collision – an aviation accident that also involved members of the U.S. Figure Skating team nearly 64 years after Sabena Flight 548
- American Airlines Flight 514 – The first crash of a Boeing 707
