= Carol Heiss =

American figure skater and actress (born 1940)

Carol Heiss Jenkins
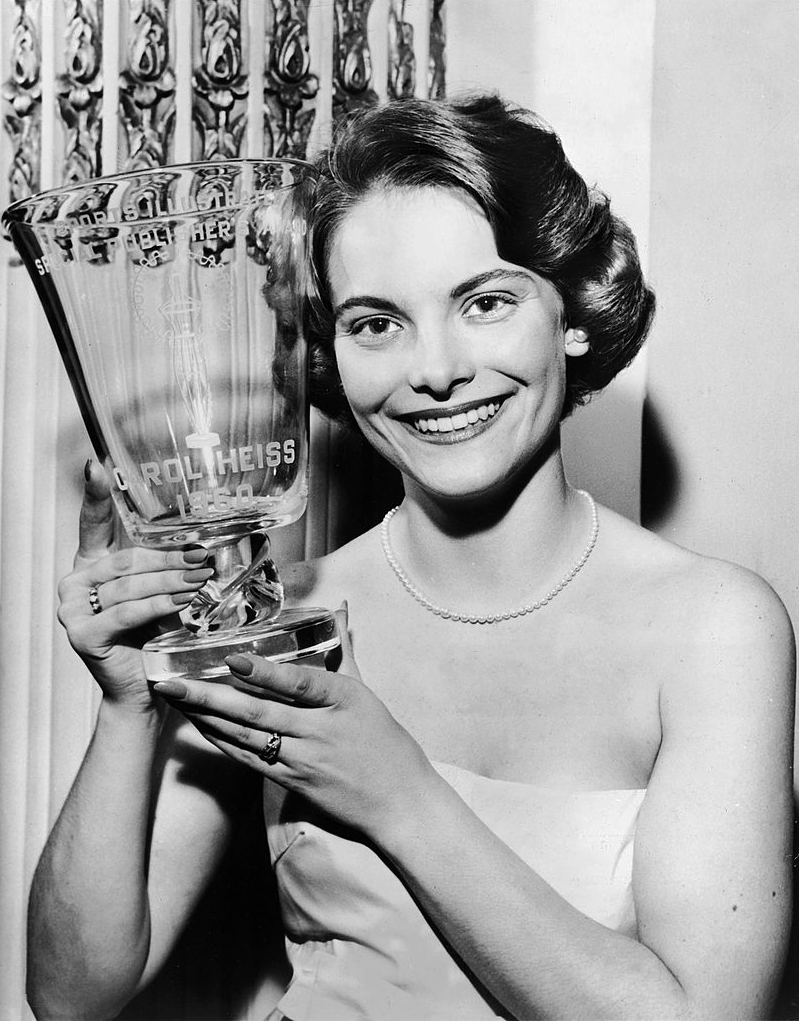
- Carol Heiss in 1960

Personal information
- Born: January 20, 1940 (age 86) New York City, U.S.
- Spouse: Hayes Alan Jenkins (m. 1961)

Figure skating career
- Country: United States
- Skating club: Skating Club of New York
- Retired: 1960
Medal record
Representing the United States
Olympic Games
Gold medal – first place	1960 Squaw Valley	Singles
Silver medal – second place	1956 Cortina d'Ampezzo	Singles
World Championships
Gold medal – first place	1960 Vancouver	Singles
Gold medal – first place	1959 Colorado Springs	Singles
Gold medal – first place	1958 Paris	Singles
Gold medal – first place	1957 Colorado Springs	Singles
Gold medal – first place	1956 Garmisch-Partenkirchen	Singles
Silver medal – second place	1955 Vienna	Singles
North American Championships
Gold medal – first place	1959 Toronto	Singles
Gold medal – first place	1957 Rochester	Singles
Silver medal – second place	1955 Regina	Singles
Silver medal – second place	1953 Cleveland	Singles

Carol Elizabeth Heiss Jenkins (born January 20, 1940) is an American former figure skater and actress. Competing in ladies' singles, she became the 1960 Olympic champion, the 1956 Olympic silver medalist, and a five-time World champion (1956–1960).

== Early life ==
Carol Elizabeth Heiss was born January 20, 1940 in New York City, and grew up in Ozone Park, Queens. Her father Edward was a baker and her mother Marie was a homemaker. Both her parents were German immigrants.

She started skating at six years old. Her younger sister and brother, Nancy Heiss and Bruce Heiss, were also elite figure skating competitors. During the 1950s, the three skating Heiss siblings were featured in publications such as Life magazine.

== Career ==
=== Competitive ===
After some early victories in regional youth skating, she came to national prominence in 1951, when she won the U.S. novice ladies' title at age 11. Coached by Pierre Brunet, she won the junior women's singles title at the national championships in 1952.

She moved up to the senior level in 1953. From 1953 to 1956, she finished second to Tenley Albright at the national championships. She competed with a slashed Achilles' tendon at the 1954 U.S. Championships.

Heiss was named in the U.S. team to the 1956 Winter Olympics in Cortina d'Ampezzo, Italy. She won the silver medal, while Albright took the gold. However, at the following World Championships, in Garmisch-Partenkirchen, West Germany, Heiss defeated Albright for the title; it was the first of her five consecutive world titles.

After the 1956 Winter Olympics, Heiss had offers to turn professional and skate in ice shows. But her mother, Marie Heiss, was quite ill with cancer at the time, and before her death in October 1956, she asked Carol to win a gold medal for her. Between 1957 and 1960, Heiss dominated women's figure skating like nobody since Sonja Henie. She was the World and U.S. Champion each year, and at the 1960 Winter Olympics in Squaw Valley, California, Heiss captured the gold medal, being ranked first by all nine judges. She also took the Olympic Oath as representative of the organizing country to open the 1960 games. She was coached by Pierre Brunet. By winning the 1960 World Championships held after the Olympics, Heiss became one of three women to have won five consecutive World Championships. She then retired from competitive skating.

In 1953, Heiss became the first female skater to land a double Axel jump. One of her trademarks was performing a series of alternating clockwise and counterclockwise single Axels. She normally rotated her jumps clockwise and spins counterclockwise; it is much more common for skaters to do both in the same direction (usually counterclockwise).

Heiss was inducted into the World Figure Skating Hall of Fame and the United States Figure Skating Hall of Fame.

=== Post-competitive ===
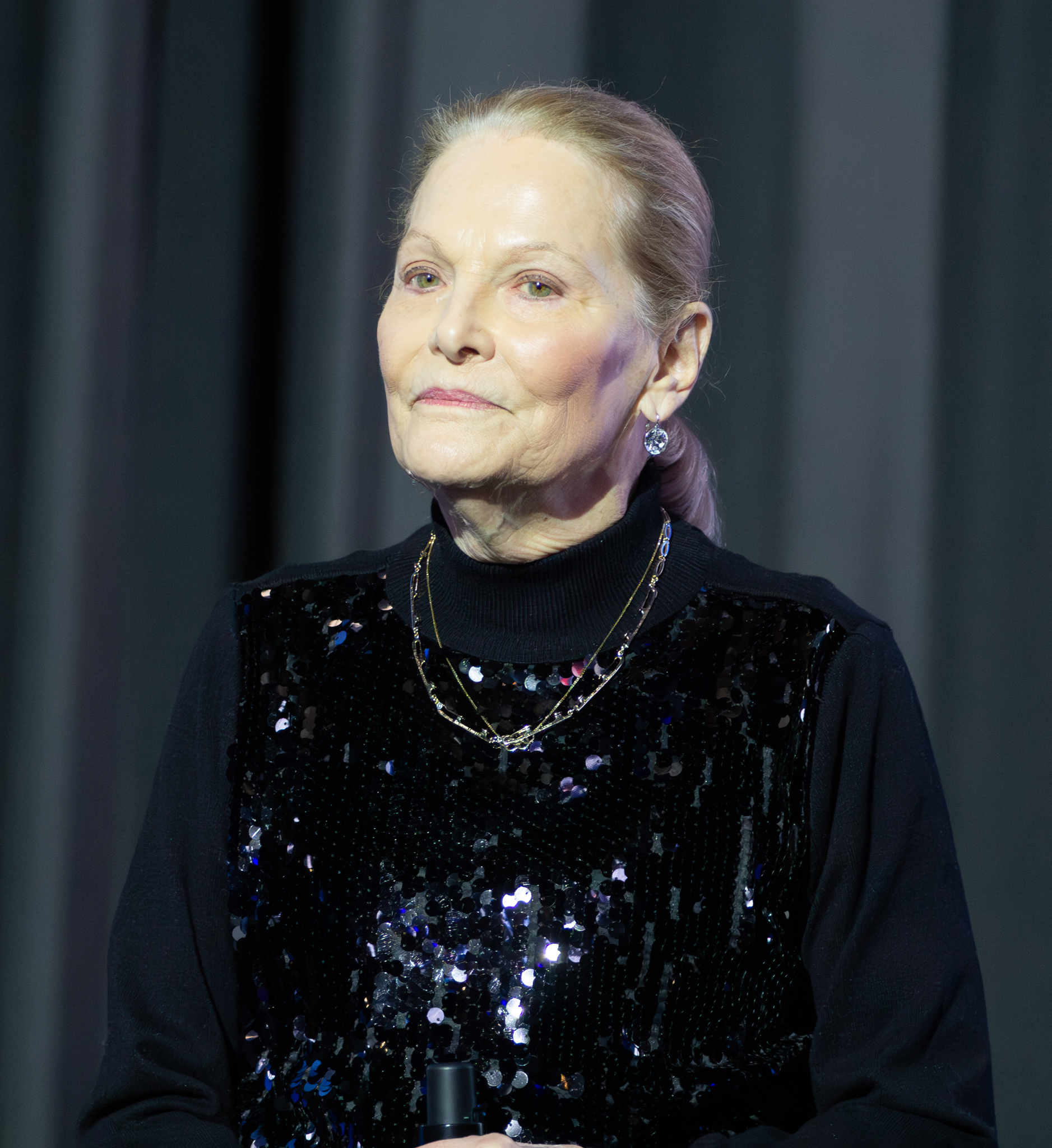
Heiss at the 2026 United States Figure Skating Championships

Heiss played the female lead in the 1961 film Snow White and the Three Stooges. In the late 1970s, she began coaching in Lakewood, Ohio. Her former students include Timothy Goebel, Tonia Kwiatkowski, and Miki Ando.

== Personal life ==
During her competitive career, Heiss attended New York University, graduating after the 1960 Winter Olympics. In 1961, she married American figure skater Hayes Alan Jenkins, who had won the 1956 Olympic gold medal. They have three children together.

== Results ==
International
Event	1952	1953	1954	1955	1956	1957	1958	1959	1960
Winter Olympics					2nd				1st
World Championships		4th		2nd	1st	1st	1st	1st	1st
North American Champ.		2nd		2nd		1st		1st	
National
U.S. Championships	1st J	2nd	2nd	2nd	2nd	1st	1st	1st	1st
J = Junior
