= Berg, Belgium =

Berg is a sub-municipality of Kampenhout in the province Flemish Brabant. It is the second-largest borough in terms of both area and population (after Kampenhout). South of Berg is the nature reserve "Torfbroek."'

== Toponymy ==
Berg owes its name to the fact that the church is located on a small hill (about 26 meters above sea level). In the past, this church could be seen from quite a distance, because there were few other buildings except a few farms.

== History ==
Plane crash in Berg-Kampenhout in 1961: Sabena Flight 548 in the southwest of the sub municipality, near the border with Steenokkerzeel

== Famous citizens ==
born or resident:

- Willem Eekelers, politician, editor, syndicalist
- Raymond Impanis, cyclist
