= Kampenhout =

- Municipality
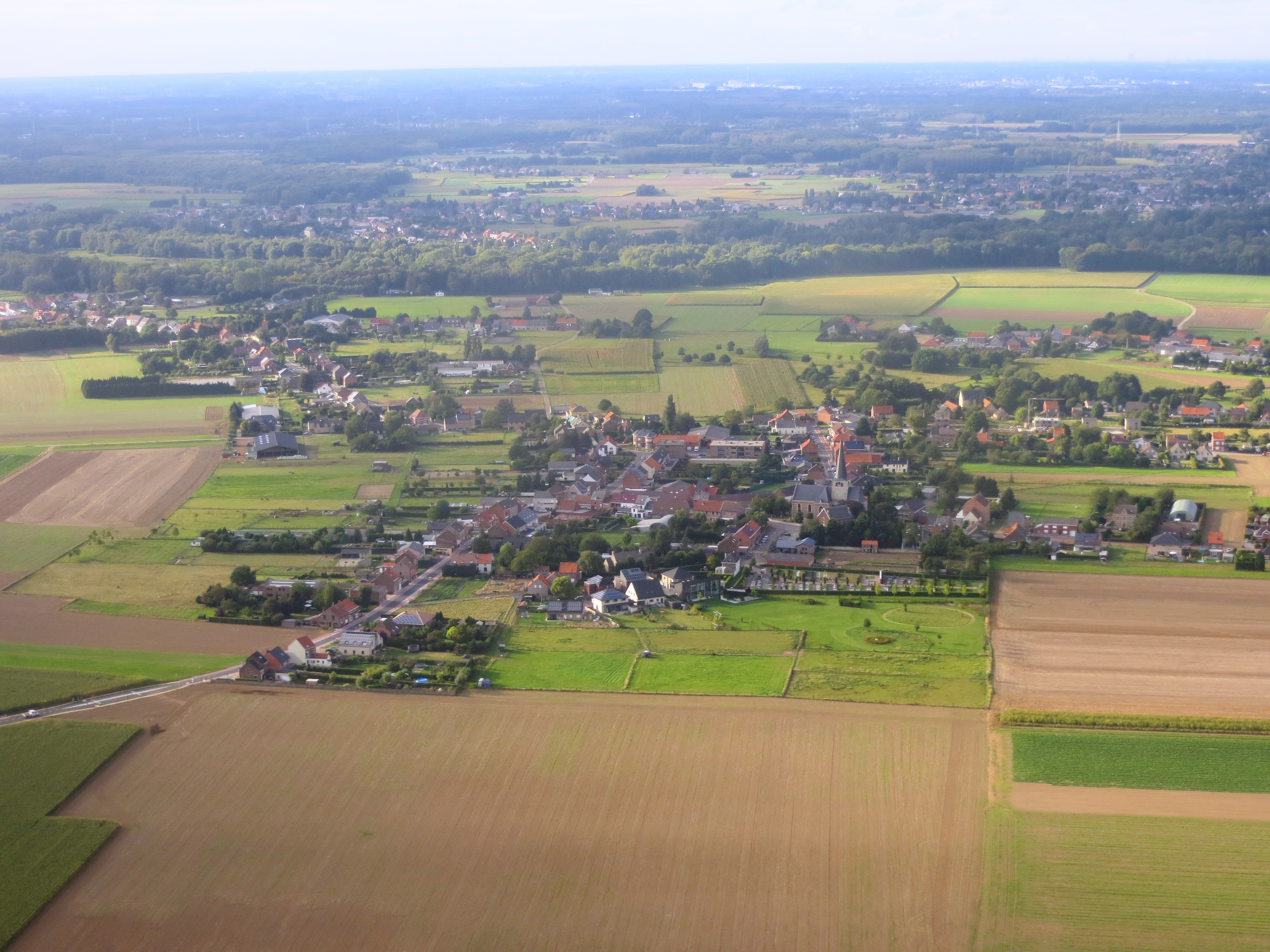
- View of Nederokkerzeel (part of Kampenhout)

- Flag Coat of arms

- Location of Kampenhout in Flemish Brabant
- Interactive map of Kampenhout
- Location in Belgium
- Coordinates: 50°57′N 04°33′E
- Country: Belgium
- Community: Flemish Community
- Region: Flemish Region
- Province: Flemish Brabant
- Arrondissement: Halle-Vilvoorde

Government
  - Mayor: Kris Leaerts
  - Governing parties: CD&V, VLD

Area
  - Total: 33.65 km^{2} (12.99 sq mi)

Population (2018-01-01)
  - Total: 11,898
  - Density: 353.6/km^{2} (915.8/sq mi)
- Postal codes: 1910
- NIS code: 23038
- Area codes: 016, 015
- Website: www.kampenhout.be

Kampenhout (Dutch pronunciation: [ˈkɑmpə(n)ɦʌut]) is a municipality located in the Belgian province of Flemish Brabant. The municipality comprises the towns of Berg, Buken, Kampenhout proper and Nederokkerzeel. On 1 January 2006 Kampenhout had a total population of 10,956. The total area is 33.49 km^{2} which gives a population density of 327 inhabitants per km^{2}.

Honorary citizenship has been bestowed upon Jules Penninckx, Armand Preud'homme, cyclist Raymond Impanis, singer Will Tura, athlete Kim Gevaert and Stef Maginelle.

Sabena Flight 548 crashed near Berg on 15 February 1961, killing all on board, as well as one person on the ground.

The Brabant Center for Music Traditions was established in Kampenhout, it shows a collection of traditional folk music and changing expositions.

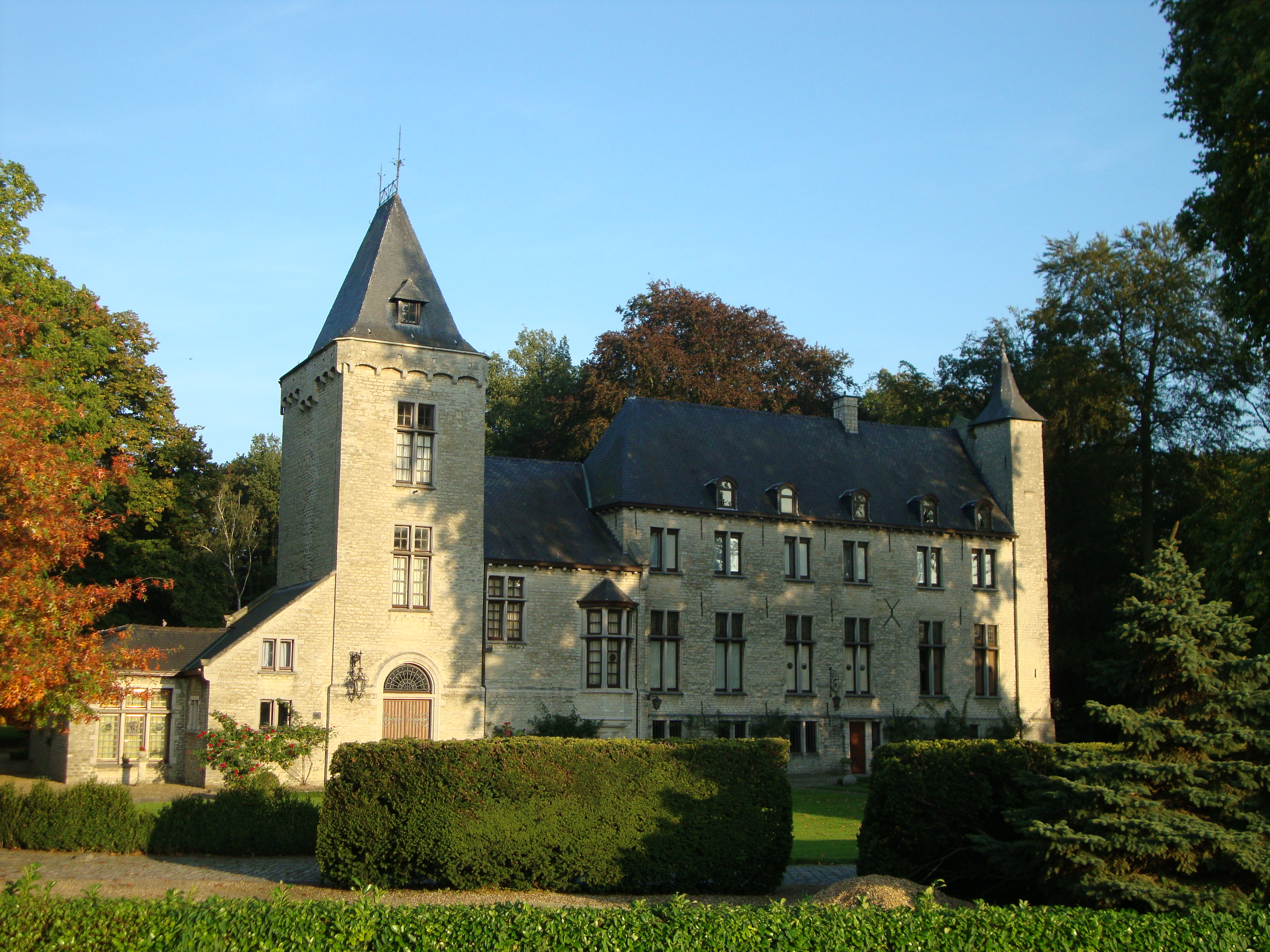
Castle Ten Opstal
