= Speed skating at the 1960 Winter Olympics – Men's 500 metres =

Speed skating at the Olympics

Men's 500 metres speed skating at the VIII Olympic Winter Games
- Pictogram for speed skating
- Venue: Squaw Valley Olympic Skating Rink
- Date: 24 February 1960
- Competitors: 46 from 15 nations
- Winning time: 40.2 =WR

Medalists
1st place, gold medalist(s)		Yevgeny Grishin	Soviet Union
2nd place, silver medalist(s)		Bill Disney	United States
3rd place, bronze medalist(s)		Rafayel Grach	Soviet Union

The 500 metres speed skating event was part of the speed skating at the 1960 Winter Olympics programme. The competition was held on the Squaw Valley Olympic Skating Rink and for the first time at the Olympics on artificially frozen ice. It was held on Wednesday, February 24, 1960. Forty-six speed skaters from 15 nations competed.

== Medalists ==
Gold	Silver	Bronze
Yevgeny Grishin; Soviet Union	Bill Disney; United States	Rafayel Grach; Soviet Union

== Records ==
These were the standing world and Olympic records (in seconds) prior to the 1960 Winter Olympics.

World record	40.2(*)	(Soviet Union) Yevgeny Grishin	Cortina d'Ampezzo/Lake Misurina (ITA)	January 22, 1956
World record	40.2(*)	(Soviet Union) Yevgeny Grishin	Cortina d'Ampezzo/Lake Misurina (ITA)	January 28, 1956
Olympic record	40.2(*)	(Soviet Union) Yevgeny Grishin	Cortina d'Ampezzo/Lake Misurina (ITA)	January 28, 1956

(*) The record was set in a high altitude venue (more than 1000 metres above sea level) and on naturally frozen ice.

Yevgeny Grishin equalized his own standing world and Olympic record.

== Results ==
Yevgeny Grishin was the first speed skater who was able to defend his 500 metres Olympic title.

Place	Speed skater	Time
1	Yevgeny Grishin (URS)	40.2 =WR
2	Bill Disney (USA)	40.3
3	Rafayel Grach (URS)	40.4
4	Hans Wilhelmsson (SWE)	40.5
5	Gennady Voronin (URS)	40.7
6	Alv Gjestvang (NOR)	40.8
7	Terry McDermott (USA)	40.9
7	Toivo Salonen (FIN)	40.9
9	Fumio Nagakubo (JPN)	41.1
10	Henk van der Grift (NED)	41.2
10	Yury Malyshev (URS)	41.2
10	Eddie Rudolph (USA)	41.2
13	Colin Hickey (AUS)	41.3
14	Hroar Elvenes (NOR)	41.4
15	André Kouprianoff (FRA)	41.5
16	Yoshitaki Hori (JPN)	41.8
16	Juhani Järvinen (FIN)	41.8
18	Raymond Gilloz (FRA)	42.0
19	Leo Tynkkynen (FIN)	42.1
20	Knut Johannesen (NOR)	42.3
20	Helmut Kuhnert (EUA)	42.3
20	Herbert Söllner (EUA)	42.3
20	Günther Tilch (EUA)	42.3
24	Nils Aaness (NOR)	42.5
24	Manfred Schüler (EUA)	42.5
26	Per-Olof Brogren (SWE)	42.7
27	Johnny Sands (CAN)	42.8
28	Wim de Graaff (NED)	42.9
29	Franz Offenberger (AUT)	43.0
30	Olle Dahlberg (SWE)	43.1
30	Ralf Olin (CAN)	43.1
32	Mario Gios (ITA)	43.3
33	Jan Pesman (NED)	43.4
33	Gunnar Sjölin (SWE)	43.4
35	Roy Tutty (AUS)	43.5
36	Takeo Mizoo (JPN)	43.7
36	Antonio Nitto (ITA)	43.7
38	Terry Monaghan (GBR)	44.0
39	Renato De Riva (ITA)	44.1
40	Hermann Strutz (AUT)	44.4
41	Larry Mason (CAN)	44.7
42	Jouko Jokinen (FIN)	45.1
43	Shinkichi Takemura (JPN)	45.9
44	Jang Yeong (KOR)	50.0
—	Bill Carow (USA)	DNF
—	Terry Malkin (GBR)	DNF
