= Speed skating at the 1960 Winter Olympics – Men's 10,000 metres =

Speed skating at the Olympics

Men's 10,000 metres speed skating at the VIII Olympic Winter Games
- Pictogram for speed skating
- Venue: Squaw Valley Olympic Skating Rink
- Date: 27 February 1960
- Competitors: 30 from 15 nations
- Winning time: 15:46.6 WR

Medalists
1st place, gold medalist(s)		Knut Johannesen	Norway
2nd place, silver medalist(s)		Viktor Kosichkin	Soviet Union
3rd place, bronze medalist(s)		Kjell Bäckman	Sweden

The 10,000 metres speed skating event was part of the speed skating at the 1960 Winter Olympics programme. It was the last speed skating contest at this Games. The competition was held on the Squaw Valley Olympic Skating Rink and for the first time at the Olympics on artificially frozen ice. It was held on Saturday, February 27, 1960. Thirty speed skaters from 15 nations competed.

== Medalists ==
Gold	Silver	Bronze
Knut Johannesen (NOR)	Viktor Kosichkin (URS)	Kjell Bäckman (SWE)

== Records ==
These were the standing world and Olympic records (in minutes) prior to the 1960 Winter Olympics.

World record	16:32.6(*)	(Norway) Hjalmar Andersen	Hamar (NOR)	February 10, 1952
Olympic record	16:35.9(**)	(Sweden) Sigvard Ericsson	Cortina d'Ampezzo/Lake Misurina (ITA)	January 31, 1956

(*) The record was set on naturally frozen ice.

(**) The record was set in a high altitude venue (more than 1000 metres above sea level) and on naturally frozen ice.

At first Kjell Bäckman bettered the world record with 16:14.2 minutes. Then Knut Johannesen set a new world record with 15:46.6 minutes and bettered the old record by more than 45 seconds.

== Results ==
Place	Speed skater	Time
1	Knut Johannesen (NOR)	15:46.6 WR
2	Viktor Kosichkin (URS)	15:49.2
3	Kjell Bäckman (SWE)	16:14.2
4	Ivar Nilsson (SWE)	16:26.0
5	Terry Monaghan (GBR)	16:31.6
6	Torstein Seiersten (NOR)	16:33.4
7	Olle Dahlberg (SWE)	16:34.6
8	Juhani Järvinen (FIN)	16:35.4
9	Keijo Tapiovaara (FIN)	16:32.2
10	Ross Zucco (USA)	16:37.6
11	André Kouprianoff (FRA)	16:39.1
12	Jan Pesman (NED)	16:41.0
13	Helmut Kuhnert (EUA)	16:43.4
14	Renato De Riva (ITA)	16:45.7
15	Arnold Uhrlass (USA)	16:49.3
16	Kees Broekman (NED)	16:59.9
17	Kurt Stille (DEN)	17:00.0
18	Mario Gios (ITA)	17:06.3
19	Hermann Strutz (AUT)	17:06.5
20	Vladimir Shilykovski (URS)	17:13.9
21	Shuji Kobayashi (JPN)	17:20.8
22	Jeen van den Berg (NED)	17:23.5
23	Roald Aas (NOR)	17:26.8
24	Leo Tynkkynen (FIN)	17:33.6
25	Takeo Mizoo (JPN)	17:42.0
26	Jang In-Won (KOR)	17:45.7
27	Ralf Olin (CAN)	17:50.9
28	Choi Yeong-Bae (KOR)	18:15.5
29	Heinz Wolfram (EUA)	18:37.0
—	Nikolajs Štelbaums (URS)	(16:41.9)

Nikolajs Štelbaums was disqualified.
