= United Team of Germany at the 1960 Winter Olympics =

- Flag of Germany superimposed with the Olympic rings
- IOC code: EUA
- NOC: United Team of Germany

in Squaw Valley
- Competitors: 74 (56 men, 18 women) in 8 sports
- Flag bearer: Helmut Recknagel
- Medals Ranked 2nd: Gold 4 Silver 3 Bronze 1 Total 8

Winter Olympics appearances (overview)
- 1956; 1960; 1964

Other related appearances
- Germany (1928–1936, 1952, 1992–); East Germany (1968–1988); West Germany (1968–1988)

Athletes from East Germany (German Democratic Republic; GDR) and West Germany (Federal Republic of Germany; FRG) competed together as the United Team of Germany at the 1960 Winter Olympics in Squaw Valley, United States.

== Medalists ==
Medal	Name	Nationality	Sport	Event
Gold	Heidi Biebl	West Germany	Alpine skiing	Women's downhill
Gold	Georg Thoma	West Germany	Nordic combined	Men's individual
Gold	Helmut Recknagel	East Germany	Ski jumping	Men's normal hill
Gold	Helga Haase	East Germany	Speed skating	Women's 500m
Silver	Hans Peter Lanig	West Germany	Alpine skiing	Men's downhill
Silver	Marika Kilius; Hans-Jürgen Bäumler	West Germany (both)	Figure skating	Pairs
Silver	Helga Haase	East Germany	Speed skating	Women's 1000m
Bronze	Barbi Henneberger	West Germany	Alpine skiing	Women's slalom

== Alpine skiing ==
Men

Athlete	Event	Race 1		Race 2		Total	
Athlete	Event	Time	Rank	Time	Rank	Time	Rank
Eberhard Riedel	Downhill					2:13.3	16
Luggi Leitner	Downhill					2:10.2	11
Willy Bogner	Downhill					2:09.7	9
Hans Peter Lanig	Downhill					2:06.5	2nd place, silver medalist(s)
Willy Bogner	Giant Slalom					DSQ	–
Luggi Leitner	Giant Slalom					1:53.6	18
Fritz Wagnerberger	Giant Slalom					1:52.5	15
Hans Peter Lanig	Giant Slalom					1:51.9	13
Sepp Behr	Slalom	1:12.1	12	1:03.9	13	2:16.0	10
Hans Peter Lanig	Slalom	1:11.9	11	1:02.4	10	2:14.3	7
Luggi Leitner	Slalom	1:10.9	6	59.6	3	2:10.5	4
Willy Bogner	Slalom	1:08.8	1	DSQ	–	DSQ	–

Women

Athlete	Event	Race 1		Race 2		Total	
Athlete	Event	Time	Rank	Time	Rank	Time	Rank
Barbi Henneberger	Downhill					1:42.4	11
Sonja Sperl	Downhill					1:41.0	7
Anneliese Meggl	Downhill					1:40.8	6
Heidi Biebl	Downhill					1:37.6	1st place, gold medalist(s)
Heidi Biebl	Giant Slalom					2:01.5	37
Barbi Henneberger	Giant Slalom					1:42.6	15
Sonja Sperl	Giant Slalom					1:41.9	9
Anneliese Meggl	Giant Slalom					1:40.7	5
Heidi Biebl	Slalom	1:09.2	35	57.3	3	2:06.5	21
Anneliese Meggl	Slalom	1:02.5	25	59.9	12	2:02.4	13
Sonja Sperl	Slalom	59.0	14	59.8	10	1:58.8	8
Barbi Henneberger	Slalom	57.4	4	59.2	6	1:56.6	3rd place, bronze medalist(s)

== Biathlon ==
Men

Event	Athlete	Time	Missed targets	Adjusted time ^{1}	Rank
20 km	Kurt Hinze	1'36:36.5	9	1'54:36.5	20
20 km	Horst Nickel	1'32:28.9	8	1'48:28.9	17
20 km	Herbert Kirchner	1'38:25.6	4	1'46:35.6	13
20 km	Kuno Werner	1'29:33.8	6	1'41:33.8	9

^{1} Two minutes added per missed target.

== Cross-country skiing ==
Men

Event	Athlete	Race	
Event	Athlete	Time	Rank
15 km	Siegfried Weiß	58:04.6	42
15 km	Werner Haase	57:40.3	38
15 km	Enno Röder	56:54.4	32
15 km	Kuno Werner	55:25.6	24
30 km	Siegfried Hug	2'05:48.6	33
30 km	Rudolf Dannhauer	2'03:38.9	29
30 km	Josef Maier	2'02:10.6	26
30 km	Helmut Weidlich	2'01:25.8	21
50 km	Egon Fleischmann	3'38:53.6	28
50 km	Siegfried Weiß	3'28:29.1	24
50 km	Rudolf Dannhauer	3'27:54.6	23
50 km	Helmut Hagg	3'25:14.6	20

Men's 4 × 10 km relay

Athletes	Race	
Athletes	Time	Rank
Kuno Werner; Helmut Hagg; Werner Haase; Enno Röder	2'31:47.1	9

Women

Event	Athlete	Race	
Event	Athlete	Time	Rank
10 km	Christa Göhler	DNF	–
10 km	Sonnhilde Hausschild-Kallus	44:14.6	18
10 km	Renate Dannhauer-Borges	43:46.1	16
10 km	Rita Czech-Blasl	42:29.0	12

Women's 3 x 5 km relay

Athletes	Race	
Athletes	Time	Rank
Ritz Czech-Blasl; Renate Dannhauer-Borges; Sonnhilde Hausschild-Kallus	1'09:25.7	5

== Figure skating ==
Men

Athlete	CF	FS	Points	Places	Rank
Bodo Bockenauer	17	16	1161.2	137	16
Tilo Gutzeit	10	10	1274.0	86	9
Manfred Schnelldorfer	9	9	1303.3	75	8

Women

Athlete	CF	FS	Points	Places	Rank
Ursel Barkey	20	18	1164.5	166	18
Bärbel Martin	18	14	1219.8	132	14

Pairs

Athletes	Points	Places	Rank
Rita Blumenberg; Werner Mensching	70.2	53	7
Margret Göbl; Franz Ningel	72.5	36	5
Marika Kilius; Hans-Jürgen Bäumler	76.8	19	2nd place, silver medalist(s)

== Ice hockey ==
=== Group B ===
Top two teams (shaded ones) from each group advanced to the final round and played for 1st-6th places, other teams played in the consolation round.

Rank	Team	Pld	W	L	T	GF	GA	Pts
1	Soviet Union	2	2	0	0	16	4	4
2	Germany	2	1	1	0	4	9	2
3	Finland	2	0	2	0	5	12	0

- USSR 8-0 Germany
- Germany 4-1 Finland

=== Final round ===
Rank	Team	Pld	W	L	T	GF	GA	Pts
1	United States	5	5	0	0	29	11	10
2	Canada	5	4	1	0	31	12	8
3	Soviet Union	5	2	2	1	24	19	5
4	Czechoslovakia	5	2	3	0	21	23	4
5	Sweden	5	1	3	1	19	19	3
6	Germany	5	0	5	0	5	45	0

- Canada 12-0 Germany
- USA 9-1 Germany
- USSR 7-1 Germany
- Czechoslovakia 9-1 Germany
- Sweden 8-2 Germany

Contestants; Paul Ambros; Georg Eberl; Markus Egen; Ernst Eggerbauer; Michael Hobelsberger; Hans Huber; Ulli Jansen; Hans Rampf; Sepp Reif; Otto Schneitberger; Siegfried Schubert; Horst Franz Schuldes; Kurt Sepp; Ernst Trautwein; Xaver Unsinn; Leonhard Waitl

== Nordic combined ==
Events:

- normal hill ski jumping (Three jumps, best two counted and shown here.)
- 15 km cross-country skiing

Athlete	Event	Ski Jumping				Cross-country			Total	
Athlete	Event	Distance 1	Distance 2	Points	Rank	Time	Points	Rank	Points	Rank
Günter Flauger	Individual	66.0	65.5	207.0	12	1'02:10.0	225.742	14	432.742	13
Martin Körner	Individual	65.0	63.5	212.0	10	1'07:37.0	204.645	27	416.645	20
Rainer Dietel	Individual	67.5	63.5	214.0	6	1'05:32.8	212.645	22	426.645	17
Georg Thoma	Individual	69.0	67.5	221.5	1	59:23.8	236.452	4	457.952	1st place, gold medalist(s)

== Ski jumping ==
Athlete	Event	Jump 1			Jump 2			Total	
Athlete	Event	Distance	Points	Rank	Distance	Points	Rank	Points	Rank
Werner Lesser	Normal hill	81.5	98.0	25	78.5	102.8	15	200.8	21
Max Bolkart	Normal hill	87.5	104.3	11	81.0	108.3	5	212.6	6
Veit Kührt	Normal hill	88.5	106.1	9	79.5	102.6	16	208.7	12
Helmut Recknagel	Normal hill	93.5	113.6	1	84.5	113.6	1	227.2	1st place, gold medalist(s)

== Speed skating ==
Men

Event	Athlete	Race	
Event	Athlete	Time	Rank
500 m	Manfred Schüler	42.5	24
500 m	Günther Tilch	42.3	20
500 m	Herbert Söllner	42.3	20
500 m	Helmut Kuhnert	42.3	20
1500 m	Günther Tilch	2:24.8	38
1500 m	Harald Norden	2:22.1	31
1500 m	Manfred Schüler	2:18.3	18
1500 m	Helmut Kuhnert	2:13.6	9
5000 m	Heinz Wolfram	9:18.2	36
5000 m	Sepp Biebl	8:48.0	32
5000 m	Helmut Kuhnert	8:25.1	22
10,000 m	Heinz Wolfram	18:37.0	29
10,000 m	Helmut Kuhnert	16:43.4	13

Women

Event	Athlete	Race	
Event	Athlete	Time	Rank
500 m	Natascha Liebknecht	51.4	20
500 m	Sigrit Behrenz	50.2	18
500 m	Helga Haase	45.9	1st place, gold medalist(s)
1000 m	Sigrit Behrenz	1:43.8	18
1000 m	Natascha Liebknecht	1:43.5	17
1000 m	Helga Haase	1:34.3	2nd place, silver medalist(s)
1500 m	Gisela Toews	2:51.1	22
1500 m	Inge Görmer	2:36.5	16
1500 m	Helga Haase	2:31.7	8
3000 m	Gisela Toews	5:48.3	17
3000 m	Inge Görmer	5:37.5	13
