= Speed skating at the 1960 Winter Olympics – Men's 5000 metres =

Speed skating at the Olympics

Men's 5000 metres speed skating at the VIII Olympic Winter Games
- Pictogram for speed skating
- Venue: Squaw Valley Olympic Skating Rink
- Date: 25 February 1960
- Competitors: 37 from 15 nations
- Winning time: 7:51.3

Medalists
1st place, gold medalist(s)		Viktor Kosichkin	Soviet Union
2nd place, silver medalist(s)		Knut Johannesen	Norway
3rd place, bronze medalist(s)		Jan Pesman	Netherlands

The 5000 metres speed skating event was part of the speed skating at the 1960 Winter Olympics programme. The competition was held on the Squaw Valley Olympic Skating Rink and for the first time at the Olympics on artificially frozen ice. It was held on Thursday, February 25, 1960. Thirty-seven speed skaters from 15 nations competed.

== Medalists ==
Gold	Silver	Bronze
Viktor Kosichkin (URS)	Knut Johannesen (NOR)	Jan Pesman (NED)

== Records ==
These were the standing world and Olympic records (in minutes) prior to the 1960 Winter Olympics.

World record	7:45.6(*)	(Soviet Union) Boris Shilkov	Medeo (URS)	January 9, 1955
Olympic record	7:48.7(*)	(Soviet Union) Boris Shilkov	Cortina d'Ampezzo/Lake Misurina (ITA)	January 29, 1956

(*) The record was set in a high altitude venue (more than 1000 metres above sea level) and on naturally frozen ice.

== Results ==
Place	Speed skater	Time
1	Viktor Kosichkin (URS)	7:51.3
2	Knut Johannesen (NOR)	8:00.8
3	Jan Pesman (NED)	8:05.1
4	Torstein Seiersten (NOR)	8:05.3
5	Valery Kotov (URS)	8:05.4
6	Oleg Goncharenko (URS)	8:06.6
7	Ivar Nilsson (SWE)	8:09.1
7	Keijo Tapiovaara (FIN)	8:09.1
9	André Kouprianoff (FRA)	8:10.4
10	Raymond Gilloz (FRA)	8:11.5
11	Terry Monaghan (GBR)	8:15.3
12	Kjell Bäckman (SWE)	8:16.0
13	Olle Dahlberg (SWE)	8:17.0
14	Arnold Uhrlass (USA)	8:18.0
15	Juhani Järvinen (FIN)	8:19.2
16	Mario Gios (ITA)	8:20.3
17	Dick Hunt (USA)	8:21.3
18	Hermann Strutz (AUT)	8:21.9
19	Jeen van den Berg (NED)	8:22.4
20	Kees Broekman (NED)	8:22.9
21	Leo Tynkkynen (FIN)	8:24.3
22	Helmut Kuhnert (EUA)	8:25.1
23	Takeo Mizoo (JPN)	8:28.7
24	Shuji Kobayashi (JPN)	8:29.8
25	Roald Aas (NOR)	8:30.1
26	Renato De Riva (ITA)	8:32.4
27	Kurt Stille (DEN)	8:33.0
28	Ralf Olin (CAN)	8:36.8
29	Franz Offenberger (AUT)	8:38.2
30	Floyd Bedbury (USA)	8:39.6
31	Antonio Nitto (ITA)	8:40.4
32	Sepp Biebl (EUA)	8:48.0
33	Terry Malkin (GBR)	8:56.1
34	Choi Yeong-Bae (KOR)	8:57.8
35	Jang In-Won (KOR)	9:01.6
36	Heinz Wolfram (EUA)	9:18.2
37	Larry Mason (CAN)	9:23.5
