= Speed skating at the 1960 Winter Olympics – Women's 1500 metres =

Women's 1500 metres speed skating at the VIII Olympic Winter Games
- Pictogram for speed skating
- Venue: Squaw Valley Olympic Skating Rink
- Date: 21 February 1960
- Competitors: 23 from 10 nations
- Winning time: 2:25.2 WR

Medalists
1st place, gold medalist(s)		Lidiya Skoblikova	Soviet Union
2nd place, silver medalist(s)		Elwira Seroczyńska	Poland
3rd place, bronze medalist(s)		Helena Pilejczyk	Poland

The women's 1500 metres speed skating event was part of the speed skating at the 1960 Winter Olympics programme. It was the first appearance of women's speed skating events at the Olympics and the 1500 metres were the second contest after the 500 metres. The competition was held on the Squaw Valley Olympic Skating Rink and for the first time at the Olympics on artificially frozen ice. It was held on Sunday, February 21, 1960. Twenty-three speed skaters from ten nations competed.

== Medalists ==
Gold	Silver	Bronze
Lidiya Skoblikova; Soviet Union	Elwira Seroczyńska; Poland	Helena Pilejczyk; Poland

== Records ==
These were the standing world and Olympic records (in minutes) prior to the 1960 Winter Olympics.

World record	2:25.5(*)	(Soviet Union) Khalida Shchegoleyeva	Medeo (URS)	January 30, 1953
Olympic record		–		

(*) The record was set in a high altitude venue (more than 1000 metres above sea level) and on naturally frozen ice.

Klara Guseva set the first Olympic record with 2:28.7 minutes. Then Elwira Seroczyńska improved the Olympic record with 2:25.7 minutes. Finally Lidiya Skoblikova set a new world record with 2:25.2 minutes.

== Results ==
Place	Speed skater	Time
1	Lidiya Skoblikova (URS)	2:25.2 WR
2	Elwira Seroczyńska (POL)	2:25.7
3	Helena Pilejczyk (POL)	2:27.1
4	Klara Guseva (URS)	2:28.7
5	Valentina Stenina (URS)	2:29.2
6	Iris Sihvonen (FIN)	2:29.7
7	Christina Scherling (SWE)	2:31.5
8	Helga Haase (EUA)	2:31.7
9	Elsa Einarsson (SWE)	2:32.9
10	Fumie Hama (JPN)	2:33.3
11	Jeanne Ashworth (USA)	2:33.7
12	Yoshiko Takano (JPN)	2:34.0
13	Doreen Ryan (CAN)	2:34.5
14	Eevi Huttunen (FIN)	2:35.1
15	Jeanne Omelenchuk (USA)	2:36.4
16	Inge Görmer (EUA)	2:36.5
17	Françoise Lucas (FRA)	2:36.6
18	Barb Lockhart (USA)	2:37.0
19	Hatsue Takamizawa (JPN)	2:43.7
20	Margaret Robb (CAN)	2:48.6
21	Kim Gyeong-Hoe (KOR)	2:48.6
22	Gisela Toews (EUA)	2:51.1
23	Han Hye-Ja (KOR)	2:55.6

As Robb and Kim skated in the same pair the referees decided that Robb finished ahead to place 20th.
