= Speed skating at the 1960 Winter Olympics – Women's 500 metres =

Women's 500 metres speed skating at the VIII Olympic Winter Games
- Pictogram for speed skating
- Venue: Squaw Valley Olympic Skating Rink
- Date: 20 February 1960
- Competitors: 23 from 10 nations
- Winning time: 45.9 OR

Medalists
1st place, gold medalist(s)		Helga Haase	United Team of Germany
2nd place, silver medalist(s)		Natalya Donchenko	Soviet Union
3rd place, bronze medalist(s)		Jeanne Ashworth	United States

The women's 500 metres speed skating event was part of the speed skating at the 1960 Winter Olympics programme. It was the first appearance of a women's event in Olympic speed skating. The competition was held on the Squaw Valley Olympic Skating Rink and for the first time at the Olympics on artificially frozen ice. It was held on Saturday, February 20, 1960. Twenty-three speed skaters from ten nations competed.

== Medalists ==
Gold	Silver	Bronze
Helga Haase; United Team of Germany	Natalya Donchenko; Soviet Union	Jeanne Ashworth; United States

== Records ==
These were the standing world and Olympic records (in seconds) prior to the 1960 Winter Olympics.

World record	45.6(*)	(Soviet Union) Tamara Rylova	Medeo (URS)	January 11, 1955
Olympic record		-		

(*) The record was set in a high altitude venue (more than 1000 metres above sea level) and on naturally frozen ice.

Helga Haase set the first Olympic record with 45.9 seconds.

== Results ==
Helga Haase became the first ever female Olympic champion in speed skating.

Place	Speed skater	Time
1	Helga Haase (EUA)	45.9 OR
2	Natalya Donchenko (URS)	46.0
3	Jeanne Ashworth (USA)	46.1
4	Tamara Rylova (URS)	46.2
5	Hatsue Takamizawa (JPN)	46.6
6	Klara Guseva (URS)	46.8
6	Elwira Seroczyńska (POL)	46.8
8	Fumie Hama (JPN)	47.4
9	Doreen Ryan (CAN)	47.7
10	Kathy Mulholland (USA)	47.9
11	Iris Sihvonen (FIN)	48.1
12	Helena Pilejczyk (POL)	48.2
13	Françoise Lucas (FRA)	48.6
14	Eevi Huttunen (FIN)	48.6
15	Christina Scherling (SWE)	48.7
16	Jeanne Omelenchuk (USA)	49.3
17	Margaret Robb (CAN)	50.0
18	Sigrit Behrenz (EUA)	50.2
19	Yoshiko Takano (JPN)	50.3
20	Natascha Liebknecht (EUA)	51.4
21	Kim Gyeong-hoe (KOR)	53.2
22	Han Hye-ja (KOR)	53.8
—	Elsa Einarsson (SWE)	DNF
