= Speed skating at the 1960 Winter Olympics – Women's 1000 metres =

Women's 1000 metres speed skating at the VIII Olympic Winter Games
- Pictogram for speed skating
- Venue: Squaw Valley Olympic Skating Rink
- Date: 22 February 1960
- Competitors: 22 from 10 nations
- Winning time: 1:34.1 OR

Medalists
1st place, gold medalist(s)		Klara Guseva	Soviet Union
2nd place, silver medalist(s)		Helga Haase	United Team of Germany
3rd place, bronze medalist(s)		Tamara Rylova	Soviet Union

The women's 1000 metres speed skating event was part of the speed skating at the 1960 Winter Olympics programme. It was the first appearance of women's speed skating events at the Olympics. The competition was held on the Squaw Valley Olympic Skating Rink and for the first time at the Olympics on artificially frozen ice. It was held on Monday, February 22, 1960. Twenty-two speed skaters from ten nations competed.

== Medalists ==
Gold	Silver	Bronze
Klara Guseva; Soviet Union	Helga Haase; United Team of Germany	Tamara Rylova; Soviet Union

== Records ==
These were the standing world and Olympic records (in minutes) prior to the 1960 Winter Olympics.

World record	1:33.4(*)	(Soviet Union) Tamara Rylova	Medeo (URS)	January 12, 1955
Olympic record		-		

(*) The record was set in a high altitude venue (more than 1000 metres above sea level) and on naturally frozen ice.

Klara Guseva set the first Olympic record with 1:34.1 minutes.

== Results ==
Place	Speed skater	Time
1	Klara Guseva (URS)	1:34.1 OR
2	Helga Haase (EUA)	1:34.3
3	Tamara Rylova (URS)	1:34.8
4	Lidiya Skoblikova (URS)	1:35.3
5	Helena Pilejczyk (POL)	1:35.8
5	Hatsue Takamizawa (JPN)	1:35.8
7	Fumie Hama (JPN)	1:36.1
8	Jeanne Ashworth (USA)	1:36.5
9	Eevi Huttunen (FIN)	1:37.2
10	Iris Sihvonen (FIN)	1:37.3
11	Christina Scherling (SWE)	1:37.5
12	Elsa Einarsson (SWE)	1:38.0
13	Doreen Ryan (CAN)	1:38.1
14	Françoise Lucas (FRA)	1:38.4
15	Jeanne Omelenchuk (USA)	1:39.8
16	Yoshiko Takano (JPN)	1:39.9
17	Natascha Liebknecht (EUA)	1:43.5
18	Sigrit Behrenz (EUA)	1:43.8
19	Margaret Robb (CAN)	1:45.8
20	Han Hye-Ja (KOR)	1:48.8
—	Kim Gyeong-Hoe (KOR)	DNF
—	Elwira Seroczyńska (POL)	DNF
