= Speed skating at the 1960 Winter Olympics – Women's 3000 metres =

Women's 3000 metres speed skating at the VIII Olympic Winter Games
- Pictogram for speed skating
- Venue: Squaw Valley Olympic Skating Rink
- Date: 23 February 1960
- Competitors: 20 from 10 nations
- Winning time: 5:14.3 OR

Medalists
1st place, gold medalist(s)		Lidiya Skoblikova	Soviet Union
2nd place, silver medalist(s)		Valentina Stenina	Soviet Union
3rd place, bronze medalist(s)		Eevi Huttunen	Finland

The women's 3000 metres speed skating event was part of the speed skating at the 1960 Winter Olympics programme. It was the first appearance of women's speed skating events at the Olympics and the 3000 metres were the last contest at this Games. The competition was held on the Squaw Valley Olympic Skating Rink and for the first time at the Olympics on artificially frozen ice. It was held on Tuesday, February 23, 1960. Twenty speed skaters from ten nations competed.

== Medalists ==
Gold	Silver	Bronze
Lidiya Skoblikova; Soviet Union	Valentina Stenina; Soviet Union	Eevi Huttunen; Finland

== Records ==
These were the standing world and Olympic records (in minutes) prior to the 1960 Winter Olympics.

World record	5:13.8(*)	(Soviet Union) Rimma Zhukova	Medeo (URS)	January 23, 1953
Olympic record		-		

(*) The record was set in a high altitude venue (more than 1000 metres above sea level) and on naturally frozen ice.

The development of the Olympic record was the following: Gisela Toews with 5:48.3 minutes (winning the first pair), Elsa Einarsson with 5:32.2 minutes, Tamara Rylova with 5:30.0 minutes, Helena Pilejczyk with 5:26.2 minutes, Christina Scherling with 5:25.5 minutes, Valentina Stenina with 5:16.9 minutes, and finally the new Olympic record was set by Lidiya Skoblikova with 5:14.3 minutes.

== Results ==
Place	Speed skater	Time
1	Lidiya Skoblikova (URS)	5:14.3 OR
2	Valentina Stenina (URS)	5:16.9
3	Eevi Huttunen (FIN)	5:21.0
4	Hatsue Takamizawa (JPN)	5:21.4
5	Christina Scherling (SWE)	5:25.5
6	Helena Pilejczyk (POL)	5:26.2
7	Elwira Seroczyńska (POL)	5:27.3
8	Jeanne Ashworth (USA)	5:28.5
9	Tamara Rylova (URS)	5:30.0
10	Yoshiko Takano (JPN)	5:30.9
11	Elsa Einarsson (SWE)	5:32.2
12	Iris Sihvonen (FIN)	5:35.2
13	Inge Görmer (EUA)	5:37.5
14	Doreen Ryan (CAN)	5:39.7
15	Françoise Lucas (FRA)	5:42.5
16	Margaret Robb (CAN)	5:43.5
17	Gisela Toews (EUA)	5:48.3
18	Cornelia Harrington (USA)	5:57.5
19	Beverly Buhr (USA)	6:03.1
20	Kim Gyeong-Hoe (KOR)	6:08.2
