= Nordic combined at the 1960 Winter Olympics =

Nordic combined at the VIII Olympic Winter Games
- Venue: Papoose Peak Jumps (ski jumping); McKinney Creek Stadium (cross-country skiing)
- Dates: 21–22 February 1960
- Competitors: 33 from 13 nations
- Winning Score: 457.95

Medalists
1st place, gold medalist(s)		Georg Thoma	United Team of Germany
2nd place, silver medalist(s)		Tormod Knutsen	Norway
3rd place, bronze medalist(s)		Nikolay Gusakov	Soviet Union

Nordic combined at the 1960 Winter Olympics consisted of one event, held from 21 February to 22 February. The ski jumping portion took place at Papoose Peak Jumps, while the cross-country portion took place at McKinney Creek Stadium (Tahoma, California).

Competition opened with the ski jumping event. Standings were determined by a point system under the parameters of combined distance points (3 jumps per competitor) and "style" points awarded for each attempt. The table below reflects the best distance out of three attempts.

The following day, the second part of the Nordic Combined mandated the 15 kilometer cross-country competition. Points were awarded by timing (set number of points by timed placing). The combined points total of both events determined the final standings.

This event marked the first time the Däscher Technique was used in the ski jumping part of the Nordic Combined competition.

== Medal summary ==
=== Medal table ===
Rank	Nation	Gold	Silver	Bronze	Total
1	United Team of Germany	1	0	0	1
2	Norway	0	1	0	1
3	Soviet Union	0	0	1	1
Totals (3 entries)		1	1	1	3

The medals for Germany and the Soviet Union were the first for those countries in Nordic combined.

=== Events ===
Event	Gold		Silver		Bronze	
Individual	Georg Thoma; United Team of Germany	457.95	Tormod Knutsen; Norway	453.00	Nikolay Gusakov; Soviet Union	452.00

== Individual ==
Athletes did three normal hill ski jumps, with the lowest score dropped. They then raced a 15 kilometre cross-country course, with the time converted to points. The athlete with the highest combined points score was awarded the gold medal.

Rank	Name	Country	Ski Jumping					Cross-country			Total
Rank	Name	Country	Jump 1	Jump 2	Jump 3	Total	Rank	Time	Points	Rank	Total
1st place, gold medalist(s)	Georg Thoma	United Team of Germany	~~106.0~~	110.0	111.5	221.5	1	59:23.8	236.45	4	457.95
2nd place, silver medalist(s)	Tormod Knutsen	Norway	107.0	~~104.5~~	110.0	217.0	4	59:31.0	236.00	5	453.00
3rd place, bronze medalist(s)	Nikolay Gusakov	Soviet Union	104.5	~~102.5~~	107.5	212.0	10	58:29.4	240.00	1	452.00
4	Pekka Ristola	Finland	107.5	106.5	~~106.0~~	214.0	6	59:32.8	235.87	6	449.87
5	Dmitry Kochkin	Soviet Union	109.5	~~105.0~~	110.0	219.5	2	1:01:32.1	228.19	11	447.69
6	Arne Larsen	Norway	~~99.0~~	109.0	106.0	215.0	5	1:01:10.1	229.61	10	444.61
7	Sverre Stenersen	Norway	102.0	103.5	~~101.5~~	205.5	14	1:00:24.0	232.58	8	438.08
8	Lars Dahlqvist	Sweden	~~95.5~~	98.0	103.5	201.5	20	59:46.0	235.03	7	436.53
9	Paavo Korhonen	Finland	~~97.5~~	98.5	99.0	197.5	24	59:08.0	237.48	3	434.98
10	Bengt Eriksson	Sweden	~~103.0~~	106.0	107.0	213.0	8	1:03:27.9	220.71	19	433.71
11	Gunder Gundersen	Norway	101.0	~~100.5~~	104.5	205.5	14	1:01:41.9	227.55	12	433.05
12	Mikhail Pryakin	Soviet Union	~~91.0~~	98.5	102.0	200.5	21	1:00:25.7	232.45	9	432.95
13	Günter Flauger	United Team of Germany	~~103.0~~	104.0	~~103.0~~	207.0	12	1:02:10.0	225.74	14	432.74
14	Enzo Perin	Italy	~~98.0~~	101.0	106.0	207.0	12	1:02:16.9	225.29	17	432.29
15	Yosuke Eto	Japan	106.0	~~101.5~~	112.5	218.5	3	1:05:51.4	211.48	23	429.98
16	Leonid Fyodorov	Soviet Union	~~91.5~~	100.5	101.5	202.0	17	1:02:13.1	225.55	15	427.55
17	Rainer Dietel	United Team of Germany	~~104.5~~	109.5	~~104.5~~	214.0	6	1:05:32.8	212.65	22	426.65
18	Vlastimil Melich	Czechoslovakia	~~96.0~~	98.5	99.5	198.0	23	1:01:49.0	227.10	13	425.10
19	Józef Karpiel	Poland	~~85.5~~	91.0	103.5	194.5	25	1:02:14.0	225.48	16	419.98
20	Martin Körner	United Team of Germany	~~102.5~~	107.0	105.0	212.0	10	1:07:37.0	204.65	27	416.65
21	Alois Leodolter	Austria	103.0	~~102.5~~	~~102.5~~	205.5	14	1:06:21.9	209.48	25	414.98
22	Ensio Hyytiä	Finland	109.5	103.0	~~76.0~~	212.5	9	1:08:14.0	202.26	29	414.76
23	Martti Maatela	Finland	96.0	~~90.0~~	106.0	202.0	17	1:06:13.5	210.00	24	412.00
24	Akemi Taniguchi	Japan	~~91.0~~	96.0	98.0	194.0	26	1:04:52.9	215.23	20	409.23
25	Irvin Servold	Canada	85.0	~~84.0~~	92.5	177.5	29	1:03:07.3	222.07	18	399.57
26	Alfred Vincelette	United States	99.0	91.5	~~89.5~~	190.5	28	1:07:35.4	204.77	26	395.27
27	Theodore Farwell	United States	~~76.5~~	86.5	86.0	172.5	30	1:05:09.4	214.19	21	386.69
28	Clarence Servold	Canada	69.5	~~65.0~~	74.5	144.0	32	58:49.1	238.71	2	382.71
29	John Cress	United States	~~90.0~~	92.0	99.5	191.5	27	1:12:59.7	183.81	31	375.31
30	Craig Lussi	United States	83.5	~~75.0~~	~~75.0~~	158.5	31	1:07:55.7	203.42	28	361.92
31	Hal Nerdal	Australia	72.0	66.0	~~65.5~~	138.0	33	1:10:15.6	194.39	30	332.39
	Rikio Yoshida	Japan	98.0	~~97.0~~	104.0	202.0	17	DNS	-	-	DNF
	Takashi Matsui	Japan	~~98.5~~	99.0	99.5	198.5	22	DNS	-	-	DNF

== Participating NOCs ==
Thirteen nations participated in Nordic combined at the Squaw Valley Games. Australia made their Olympic Nordic combined debut.

- Australia (1)
- Austria (1)
- Canada (2)
- Czechoslovakia (1)
- Finland (4)
- United Team of Germany (4)
- Italy (1)
- Japan (4)
- Norway (4)
- Poland (1)
- Soviet Union (4)
- Sweden (2)
- United States (4)
