= Martti (given name) =

Male given name

- Gender: Male
- Language: Finnish, Estonian
- Name day: 10 November (Finland)

Origin
- Origin: Originally from Latin Martinus
- Region of origin: Finland, Estonia

Other names
- Nicknames: Masi, Mara
- Derived: Martinus

Martti is a Finnish and Estonian masculine given name. The name is the Finnish equivalent of the Latin name Martinus and originally refers to Mars, the god of war. It is a cognate of the name Martin. As of 1 January 2023, 531 men in Estonia have the first name Martti, making it the 275th most popular male name in the country.

Individuals named Martti include:

- Martti Aho (1896–1968), Finnish military colonel
- Martti Ahtisaari (1937–2023), Finnish politician; tenth President of Finland
- Martti Aiha (1952–2023), Finnish sculptor
- Martti Aljand (born 1987), Estonian swimmer
- Martti Haavio (1899–1973), Finnish poet, folklorist and mythologist
- Martti Häikiö (1949–2025), Finnish historian and writer
- Martti Halme (born 1943), Finnish footballer
- Martti Haukioja (born 1999), Finnish footballer
- Martti Helde (born 1987), Estonian film director and screenwriter
- Martti Huhtala (1918–2005), Finnish Nordic combined skier
- Martti Hyvärinen (born 1939), Finnish footballer
- Martti Ingman (1907–1989), Finnish diplomat
- Martti Jarkko (born 1953), Finnish ice hockey player
- Martti Järventaus (born 1960), Finnish swimmer
- Martti Järventie (born 1976), Finnish ice hockey player
- Martti Järvinen (born 1933), Finnish footballer
- Martti Juhkami (born 1988), Estonian volleyball player
- Martti Jukola (1900–1952), Finnish hurdler and sports journalist
- Martti Jylhä (born 1987), Finnish cross-country skier
- Martti J. Kari (1960–2023), Finnish military officer and academic
- Martti Katajisto (1926–2000), Finnish actor
- Martti Keel (born 1992), Estonian volleyball player
- Martti Kellokumpu (born 1963), Finnish freestyle skier
- Martti Ketelä (1944–2002), Finnish modern pentathlete
- Martti Kiilholma (born 1950), Finnish long-distance runner
- Martti Korhonen (born 1953), Finnish politician
- Martti Korkia-Aho (1930–2012), Finnish businessman and politician
- Martti Koskenniemi (born 1953), Finnish international lawyer and diplomat
- Martti Kosma (1922–1999), Finnish footballer and manager
- Martti Kuoppa (born 1978), Finnish BMX rider
- Martti Kuusela (born 1945), Finnish footballer and manager
- Martti Kykkling (1857–1917), Finnish politician
- Martti Laakso (born 1943), Finnish wrestler
- Martti Laitinen (1929–2017), Finnish footballer
- Martti Lappalainen (1902–1941), Finnish cross-country skier and biathlete
- Martti Larni (1909–1993), Finnish writer
- Martti Lauronen (1913–1987), Finnish cross-country skier
- Martti Lautala (1928–2016), Finnish cross-country skier
- Martti Maatela (1935–2013), Finnish Nordic combined skier
- Martti Mansikka (1933–2024), Finnish gymnast
- Martti Matilainen (1907–1993), Finnish steeplechase and middle-distance runner
- Martti Marttelin (1897–1940), Finnish long-distance runner
- Martti Meinilä (1927–2005), Finnish biathlete
- Martti Mertanen (1925–2001), Finnish painter
- Martti Miettunen (1907–2002), Finnish politician; former Prime Minister of Finland
- Martti Mölsä (born 1952), Finnish politician
- Martti "Masa" Niemi (1914–1960), Finnish actor
- Martti Nieminen (1891–1963), Finnish wrestler
- Martti Nissinen (born 1959), Finnish theologian
- Martti Nõmme (born 1993), Estonian ski jumper
- Martti Peltonen (1901–1973), Finnish politician
- Martti Peltoniemi (1935–1975), Finnish wrestler
- Martti Pennanen (1923–2010), Finnish actor
- Martti Pihkala (1906–1966), Finnish politician
- Martti Pesonen (born 1942), Finnish motorcycle road racer
- Martti Pokela (1924–2007), Finnish folk musician and composer
- Martti Räsänen (1893–1976), Finnish linguist and turkologist
- Martti Rautanen (1845–1926), Finnish missionary
- Martti Rautio (1935–2017), Finnish-Canadian cross-country skier
- Martti Rosenblatt (born 1987), Estonian volleyball player
- Martti Rousi (born 1960), Finnish cellist
- Martti Saarinen (born 1980), Finnish singer
- Martti Saario (1906–1988), Finnish organizational theorist and academic
- Martti Salomies (1923–1987), Finnish diplomat and ambassador
- Martti Olavi Siirala (1922–2008), Finnish psychiatrist, psychoanalyst and philosopher
- Martti Simojoki (1908–1999), Finnish Archbishop of Turku
- Martti Sipilä (1915–2003), Finnish cross-country skier
- Martti Soosaar (1933–2017), Estonian journalist and writer
- Martti Suntela (1903–1999), Finnish agronomist and politician
- Martti Suosalo (born 1962), Finnish actor and singer
- Martti Talja (born 1951), Finnish politician
- Martti Talvela (1935–1989), Finnish operatic bass
- Martti Tolamo (1907–1940), Finnish decathlete, long jumper and pentathlete
- Martti Uosikkinen (1909–1940), Finnish gymnast
- Martti Välikangas (1893–1973), Finnish architect
- Martti Wallén (1948–2024), Finnish operatic bass
- Kurt Martti Wallenius (1893–1984), Finnish military major general
