= Biathlon at the 1960 Winter Olympics – Individual =

Men's biathlon individual at the VIII Olympic Winter Games
- Venue: McKinney Creek Stadium
- Dates: 21 February 1960
- Competitors: 30 from 9 nations
- Winning time: 1:33:21.6

Medalists
1st place, gold medalist(s)		Klas Lestander	Sweden
2nd place, silver medalist(s)		Antti Tyrväinen	Finland
3rd place, bronze medalist(s)		Aleksandr Privalov	Soviet Union

The Men's 20 kilometre individual biathlon competition at the 1960 Winter Olympics was held on 21 February, at McKinney Creek Stadium. The firing ranges were located at the following points on the 20-kilometer course: 6.5 km — 200 meter range, 9.5 km — 250 meter range, 12.5 km — 150 meter range and 15 km — 100 meter range. The first three series were fired from a prone position, the last standing. Each miss of the target cost two minutes.

== Results ==
Klas Lestander became the first Olympic biathlon champion on the back of a perfect shooting performance, the only one of the event. The victory came despite Lestander's ski time, which was only 15th, right in the middle of the 30-man field. The defending world champion, Vladimir Melanin, had the third fastest ski time, but eight minutes in penalties left him fourth. The other medals went to racers with some of the better shooting performances; Antti Tyrväinen took just four minutes in penalties for silver, and Aleksandr Privalov only six minutes to win bronze. The two fastest skiers were Frenchmen Victor Arbez and René Mercier, both more than two minutes ahead of Privalov, and more than seven ahead of Lestander. However, both struggled on the range, Mercier missing 15 of 20 shots to incur a half-hour in penalties, and Abrez 18 of 20 to add 36 minutes to his time.

Rank	Name	Country	Ski Time	Misses	Result	Deficit
1st place, gold medalist(s)	Klas Lestander	Sweden	1:33:21.6	0 (0+0+0+0)	1:33:21.6	–
2nd place, silver medalist(s)	Antti Tyrväinen	Finland	1:29:57.7	2 (1+1+0+0)	1:33:57.7	+36.1
3rd place, bronze medalist(s)	Aleksandr Privalov	Soviet Union	1:28:54.2	3 (0+0+0+3)	1:34:54.2	+1:32.6
4	Vladimir Melanin	Soviet Union	1:27:42.4	4 (1+1+2+0)	1:35:42.4	+2:20.8
5	Valentin Pshenitsyn	Soviet Union	1:30:45.8	3 (0+1+1+1)	1:36:45.8	+3:24.2
6	Dmitri Sokolov	Soviet Union	1:28:16.7	5 (2+0+0+3)	1:38:16.7	+4:55.1
7	Ola Wærhaug	Norway	1:36:35.8	1 (0+1+0+0)	1:38:35.8	+5:14.2
8	Martti Meinilä	Finland	1:29:17.0	5 (0+1+2+2)	1:39:17.0	+5:55.4
9	Kuno Werner	United Team of Germany	1:29:33.8	6 (2+1+1+2)	1:41:33.8	+8:12.2
10	Henry Hermansen	Norway	1:34:20.1	4 (0+0+0+4)	1:42:20.1	+8:58.5
11	Jon Istad	Norway	1:36:53.5	4 (1+1+2+0)	1:44:53.5	+11:31.9
12	Tage Lundin	Sweden	1:33:56.3	6 (0+2+3+1)	1:45:56.3	+12:34.7
13	Herbert Kirchner	United Team of Germany	1:38:35.6	4 (1+0+1+2)	1:46:35.6	+13:14.0
14	John Burritt	United States	1:36:36.8	5 (0+1+3+1)	1:46:36.8	+13:15.2
15	Eero Laine	Finland	1:33:28.3	7 (2+0+4+1)	1:47:28.3	+14:06.7
16	Sven Agge	Sweden	1:30:21.7	9 (3+3+3+0)	1:48:21.7	+15:00.1
17	Horst Nickel	United Team of Germany	1:32:28.9	8 (3+1+0+4)	1:48:28.9	+15:07.3
18	Pentti Taskinen	Finland	1:36:29.7	7 (0+3+2+2)	1:50:29.7	+17:08.1
19	Adolf Wiklund	Sweden	1:30:07.8	12 (2+3+3+4)	1:54:07.8	+20:46.2
20	Kurt Hinze	United Team of Germany	1:36:36.5	9 (3+2+2+2)	1:54:36.5	+21:14.9
21	Dick Mize	United States	1:33:56.2	11 (3+3+5+0)	1:55:56.2	+22:34.6
22	René Mercier	France	1:26:13.2	15 (4+4+2+5)	1:56:13.2	+22:51.6
23	Gustav Hanson	United States	1:40:06.2	9 (3+3+2+1)	1:58:06.2	+24:44.6
24	Larry Damon	United States	1:33:38.2	13 (5+3+3+2)	1:59:38.2	+26:16.6
25	Victor Arbez	France	1:25:58.4	18 (4+5+5+4)	2:01:58.4	+28:36.8
26	Pál Sajgó	Hungary	1:34:27.3	14 (5+3+2+4)	2:02:27.3	+29:05.7
27	Gilbert Mercier	France	1:29:16.6	17 (4+4+4+5)	2:03:16.6	+29:55.0
28	Paul Romand	France	1:28:48.4	18 (5+5+4+4)	2:04:48.4	+31:26.8
29	John Moore	Great Britain	1:40:50.8	14 (4+2+4+4)	2:08:50.8	+35:29.2
30	Norman Shutt	Great Britain	1:45:36.5	13 (2+5+3+3)	2:11:36.5	+38:14.9
