= Italy at the 1960 Winter Olympics =

- IOC code: ITA
- NOC: Italian National Olympic Committee
- Website: www.coni.it (in Italian)

in Squaw Valley
- Competitors: 28 (21 men, 7 women) in 6 sports
- Flag bearer: Bruno Alberti
- Medals Ranked 14th: Gold 0 Silver 0 Bronze 1 Total 1

Winter Olympics appearances (overview)
- 1924; 1928; 1932; 1936; 1948; 1952; 1956; 1960; 1964; 1968; 1972; 1976; 1980; 1984; 1988; 1992; 1994; 1998; 2002; 2006; 2010; 2014; 2018; 2022; 2026

Italy competed at the 1960 Winter Olympics in Squaw Valley, United States.

== Medalists ==
Medal	Name	Sport	Event
Bronze	Giuliana Minuzzo Chenal	Alpine skiing	Women's giant slalom

== Alpine skiing ==
Men

Athlete	Event	Race 1		Race 2		Total	
Athlete	Event	Time	Rank	Time	Rank	Time	Rank
Felice De Nicolò	Downhill					2:18.1	25
Italo Pedroncelli	Downhill					2:16.8	24
Paride Milianti	Downhill					2:10.8	12
Bruno Alberti	Downhill					2:09.1	6
Italo Pedroncelli	Giant Slalom					1:53.8	19
Carlo Senoner	Giant Slalom					1:53.1	17
Paride Milianti	Giant Slalom					1:50.9	8
Bruno Alberti	Giant Slalom					1:50.1	5
Bruno Alberti	Slalom	1:28.5	44	1:02.1	8	2:30.6	20
Carlo Senoner	Slalom	1:18.9	26	1:01.8	7	2:20.7	13
Italo Pedroncelli	Slalom	1:17.2	21	1:02.5	11	2:19.7	11
Paride Milianti	Slalom	1:10.1	4	1:04.3	14	2:14.4	8

Women

Athlete	Event	Race 1		Race 2		Total	
Athlete	Event	Time	Rank	Time	Rank	Time	Rank
Jolanda Schir	Downhill					1:44.2	14
Carla Marchelli	Downhill					1:41.6	9
Jerta Schir	Downhill					1:40.5	5
Pia Riva	Downhill					1:39.9	4
Pia Riva	Giant Slalom					1:42.9	17
Jerta Schir	Giant Slalom					1:42.6	15
Carla Marchelli	Giant Slalom					1:40.7	5
Giuliana Chenal-Minuzzo	Giant Slalom					1:40.2	3rd place, bronze medalist(s)
Jerta Schir	Slalom	1:05.6	30	1:25.8	36	2:06.2	20
Jolanda Schir	Slalom	1:02.3	24	1:00.6	16	2:28.1	35
Carla Marchelli	Slalom	1:01.1	21	1:01.8	18	2:02.9	15
Giuliana Chenal-Minuzzo	Slalom	57.4	4	1:01.9	19	1:59.3	10

== Cross-country skiing ==
Men

Event	Athlete	Race	
Event	Athlete	Time	Rank
15 km	Giuseppe Steiner	54:42.3	20
15 km	Pompeo Fattor	54:31.1	19
15 km	Giulio Deflorian	53:24.1	14
15 km	Marcello de Dorigo	52:53.5	9
30 km	Giuseppe Steiner	DNF	–
30 km	Ottavio Compagnoni	1'58:55.0	17
30 km	Giulio Deflorian	1'56:40.6	11
30 km	Pompeo Fattor	1'57:40.5	14
50 km	Alfredo Dibona	3'33:31.6	25
50 km	Antonio Schenatti	3'26:32.2	21
50 km	Livio Stuffer	3'20:43.4	18
50 km	Federico de Florian	3'16:23.6	16

Men's 4 × 10 km relay

Athletes	Race	
Athletes	Time	Rank
Giulio Deflorian; Giuseppe Steiner; Pompeo Fattor; Marcello de Dorigo	2'22:32.5	5

== Figure skating ==
Women

Athlete	CF	FS	Points	Places	Rank
Carla Tichatschek	16	15	1201.1	143	16
Anna Galmarini	8	10	1295.0	79	8

== Nordic combined ==
Events:

- normal hill ski jumping (Three jumps, best two counted and shown here.)
- 15 km cross-country skiing

Athlete	Event	Ski Jumping				Cross-country			Total	
Athlete	Event	Distance 1	Distance 2	Points	Rank	Time	Points	Rank	Points	Rank
Enzo Perin	Individual	62.0	66.5	207.0	12	1'02:16.9	225.290	17	432.290	14

== Ski jumping ==
Athlete	Event	Jump 1			Jump 2			Total	
Athlete	Event	Distance	Points	Rank	Distance	Points	Rank	Points	Rank
Luigi Pennacchio	Normal hill	70.5	78.7	42	72.5	92.5	37	171.2	39
Enzo Perin	Normal hill	75.0	84.8	40	76.0	96.8	31	181.6	37
Nilo Zandanel	Normal hill	84.0	95.0	28	71.0	89.8	40	184.8	36
Dino De Zordo	Normal hill	85.5	99.7	22	77.0	99.1	27	198.8	24

== Speed skating ==
Men

Event	Athlete	Race	
Event	Athlete	Time	Rank
500 m	Renato de Riva	44.1	39
500 m	Antonio Nitto	43.7	36
500 m	Mario Gios	43.3	32
1500 m	Renato de Riva	2:20.6	27
1500 m	Antonio Nitto	2:19.6	25
1500 m	Mario Gios	2:18.6	20
5000 m	Antonio Nitto	8:40.4	31
5000 m	Renato de Riva	8:32.4	26
5000 m	Mario Gios	8:20.3	16
10,000 m	Mario Gios	17:06.3	18
10,000 m	Renato de Riva	16:45.7	14
