= Japan at the 1960 Winter Olympics =

- IOC code: JPN (JAP used at these Games)
- NOC: Japanese Olympic Committee
- Website: www.joc.or.jp (in Japanese and English)

in Squaw Valley
- Competitors: 41 (36 men, 5 women) in 7 sports
- Flag bearer: Junko Ueno
- Medals: Gold 0 Silver 0 Bronze 0 Total 0

Winter Olympics appearances (overview)
- 1928; 1932; 1936; 1948; 1952; 1956; 1960; 1964; 1968; 1972; 1976; 1980; 1984; 1988; 1992; 1994; 1998; 2002; 2006; 2010; 2014; 2018; 2022; 2026

Japan competed at the 1960 Winter Olympics in Squaw Valley, United States.

== Alpine skiing ==
Men

Athlete	Event	Race 1		Race 2		Total	
Athlete	Event	Time	Rank	Time	Rank	Time	Rank
Masayoshi Mitani	Downhill					2:31.3	53
Osamu Tada	Downhill					2:28.5	46
Chiharu Igaya	Downhill					2:25.0	34
Takashi Takeda	Giant Slalom					2:13.4	44
Osamu Tada	Giant Slalom					2:06.5	35
Masayoshi Mitani	Giant Slalom					2:05.6	33
Chiharu Igaya	Giant Slalom					1:55.8	23
Takashi Takeda	Slalom	1:26.7	43	1:29.3	35	2:56.0	33
Masayoshi Mitani	Slalom	1:23.8	36	DSQ	–	DSQ	–
Osamu Tada	Slalom	1:17.2	22	1:26.8	34	2:44.0	26
Chiharu Igaya	Slalom	1:10.9	6	1:09.3	19	2:20.2	12

== Cross-country skiing ==
Men

Event	Athlete	Race	
Event	Athlete	Time	Rank
15 km	Eiji Kurita	58:57.0	45
15 km	Takashi Matsuhashi	57:49.1	40
15 km	Kazuo Sato	56:15.0	30
30 km	Eiji Kurita	2'11:25.8	39
30 km	Kazuo Sato	2'07:07.2	37
30 km	Takashi Matsuhashi	2'06:25.5	35
50 km	Kazuo Sato	DNF	–
50 km	Eiji Kurita	3'38:40.6	27

Men's 4 × 10 km relay

Athletes	Race	
Athletes	Time	Rank
Takashi Matsuhashi; Kazuo Sato; Eiji Kurita; Akemi Taniguchi	2'36:44.9	10

== Figure skating ==
Men

Athlete	CF	FS	Points	Places	Rank
Nabuo Sato	11	17	1206.8	120	14

Women

Athlete	CF	FS	Points	Places	Rank
Miwa Fukuhara	19	22	1134.7	188	21
Junko Ueno	15	20	1176.5	158	17

== Ice hockey ==
=== Group A ===
Top two teams (shaded ones) from each group advanced to the final round and played for 1st-6th places, other teams played in the consolation round.

Rank	Team	Pld	W	L	T	GF	GA	Pts
1	Canada	2	2	0	0	24	3	4
2	Sweden	2	1	1	0	21	5	2
3	Japan	2	0	2	0	1	38	0

- Canada 19-1 Japan
- Sweden 19-0 Japan

=== Consolation round ===
Team	Pld	W	L	T	GF	GA	Pts
Finland	4	3	0	1	50	11	7
Japan 8th	4	2	1	1	32	22	5
Australia	4	0	4	0	8	57	0

- Finland 6-6 Japan
- Japan 13-2 Australia
- Finland 11-2 Japan
- Japan 11-3 Australia

Contestants; Chikashi Akazawa; Shinichi Honma; Toshiei Honma; Hidenori Inatsu; Atsuo Irie; Joji Iwaoka; Takashi Kakihara; Yoshihiro Miyazaki; Masao Murano; Isao Ono; Akiyoshi Segawa; Shigeru Shimada; Kunito Takagi; Mamoru Takashima; Masami Tanabu; Shoichi Tomita; Toshihiko Yamada

== Nordic combined ==
Events:

- normal hill ski jumping (Three jumps, best two counted and shown here.)
- 15 km cross-country skiing

Athlete	Event	Ski Jumping				Cross-country			Total	
Athlete	Event	Distance 1	Distance 2	Points	Rank	Time	Points	Rank	Points	Rank
Rikio Yoshida	Individual	57.0	64.0	202.0	17	DNF	–	–	DNF	–
Yosuke Eto	Individual	62.0	68.0	218.5	3	1'05:51.4	211.484	23	429.984	15
Akemi Taniguchi	Individual	58.5	62.0	194.0	26	1'04:52.9	215.226	20	409.226	24
Takashi Matsui	Individual	62.0	61.0	198.5	22	DNF	–	–	DNF	–

== Ski jumping ==
Athlete	Event	Jump 1			Jump 2			Total	
Athlete	Event	Distance	Points	Rank	Distance	Points	Rank	Points	Rank
Takashi Matsui	Normal hill	78.5	92.6	33	75.0	97.0	29	189.6	30
Koichi Sato	Normal hill	82.0	98.4	24	78.0	101.9	20	200.3	22
Yosuke Eto	Normal hill	85.5	102.2	17	72.5	95.5	34	197.7	25
Sadao Kikuchi	Normal hill	88.5	104.1	13	77.0	102.1	19	206.2	15

== Speed skating ==
Men

Event	Athlete	Race	
Event	Athlete	Time	Rank
500 m	Shinkichi Takemura	45.9	43
500 m	Takeo Mizoo	43.7	36
500 m	Yoshitaki Hori	41.8	16
500 m	Fumio Nagakubo	41.1	9
1500 m	Shuji Kobayashi	2:23.0	34
1500 m	Takeo Mizoo	2:22.6	33
1500 m	Toshitaki Hori	2:21.7	29
1500 m	Fumio Nagakubo	2:18.7	21
5000 m	Shuji Kobayashi	8:29.8	24
5000 m	Takeo Mizoo	8:28.7	23
10,000 m	Takeo Mizoo	17:42.0	25
10,000 m	Shuji Kobayashi	17:20.8	21

Women

Event	Athlete	Race	
Event	Athlete	Time	Rank
500 m	Yoshiko Takano	50.3	19
500 m	Fumie Hama	47.4	8
500 m	Hatsue Nagakubo-Takamizawa	46.6	5
1000 m	Yoshiko Takano	1:39.9	16
1000 m	Fumie Hama	1:36.1	7
1000 m	Hatsue Nagakubo-Takamizawa	1:35.8	5
1500 m	Hatsue Nagakubo-Takamizawa	2:43.7	19
1500 m	Yoshiko Takano	2:34.0	12
1500 m	Fumie Hama	2:33.3	10
3000 m	Yoshiko Takano	5:30.9	10
3000 m	Hatsue Nagakubo-Takamizawa	5:21.4	4
