= Mertanen =

Mertanen is a Finnish surname. Notable people with the surname include:

- Martti Mertanen (1925–2001), Finnish artist and educator
- Terhi Mertanen (born 1981), Finnish ice hockey player and coach
