= Carow =

Carow is a surname. Notable people with the surname include:

- Berit Carow (born 1981), German rower
- Bill Carow (1924–2011), American speed skater
- Evelyn Carow (born 1931), German movie editor
- Heiner Carow (1929–1997), German film director and screenwriter
- Jochen Carow (born 1994), German footballer
- Jorge W. Carow (1874–1936), American politician and lawyer
- Leonard Carow (born 1994), German actor
