= Eero Laine =

Eero Laine may refer to:

- Eero Laine (biathlete) (1926–1998), Finnish Olympic biathlete
- Eero Laine (rower) (1933–2023), Finnish Olympic rower
