= Hans Wilhelmsson =

Swedish speed skater

Personal information
- Born: 14 February 1936 Eskilstuna, Sweden
- Died: 5 January 2004 (aged 67) Karlsborg, Sweden

Sport
- Country: Sweden
- Sport: speed skating
- Club: IF Castor

Hans Wilhelmsson (14 February 1936 – 5 January 2004) was a Swedish speed skater. He represented IF Castor in club competitions. Outside of his sporting career, he worked as a car salesman, insurance agent and bank director.

He died in January 2004 at 67 years old.

== Merits ==
- Fourth place in men's speed skating (500 meters) - Olympics 1960

== Awards ==
- Sports performance of the year - 1960
