= Yury Malyshev (speed skater) =

Soviet speed skater (1933–2013)

Personal information
- Nationality: Soviet
- Born: 13 May 1933; Krasnoyarsk, Russia
- Died: 2013 (aged 79–80)

Sport
- Sport: Speed skating

Yury Malyshev (13 May 1933 – 2013) was a Soviet speed skater. He competed in the men's 500 metres event at the 1960 Winter Olympics. Malyshev died in 2013.
