= Inge Görmer =

German speed skater

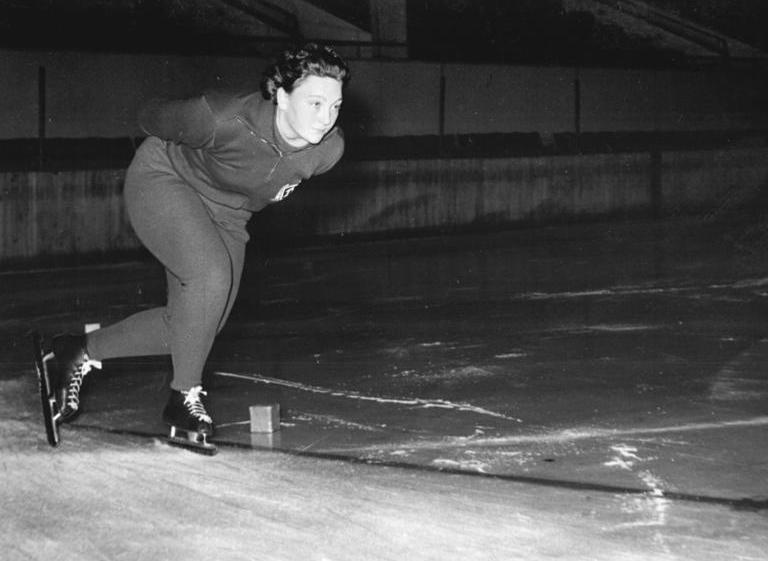
Inge Görmer from SC Einheit-Berlin, training in the Werner-Seelenbinder-Halle.

Inge Görmer (born 11 April 1934) is a former East-German speedskater. She took part in five international championships. Four times as East-German at the World Allround Championships (1956, 1957, 1958 and 1959) and once, as member of the German Unified team, at the Winter Olympics (1960).

== History ==
At her international debut, during the Wch Allround of 1956 in Kvarnsveden, she finished 10th. A year later, during the op het Wch Allround of 1957 in Imatrankoski, she placed 15th, but the next year, in Kristinehamn, she had improved to become 7th. Her last World championship in Sverdlovsk, 1959 ended with a somewhat disappointing 23rd place, without being able to skate her favorite distance, the 3000 m. In her last active year, she competed at the first Olympic speed skating tournament open for women, the Squaw Valley 1960 Winter Olympics. Her she finished 16th (1500 m) and 13th (3000 m)

== East-German records ==
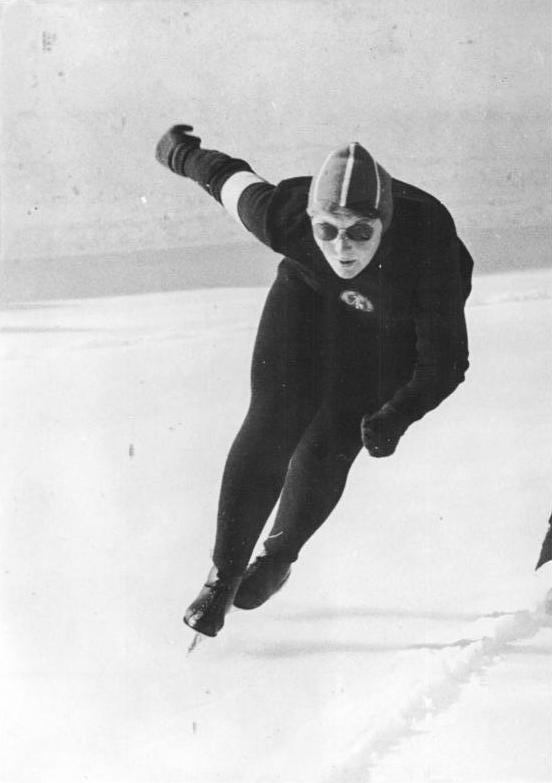
Taking part in the unified German team in 1960, Inge Görmer here skates on 3 February 1960, most probably at the Davos icerink.

Over the course of her career, Görmer skated eight East-German national records, the last three of which were also All-German all-time best ever marks:

Event	Result	Date	Venue
1500 m	3:05.4	14 February 1953	Geising
1000 m	2:00.6	15 February 1953	Geising
1000 m	1:53.0	26 February 1953	Vienna
5000 m	11:50.4	7 February 1954	Geising
3000 m	6:09.8	13 February 1954	Svratka
5000 m	10:24.5	14 February 1954	Svratka
5000 m	9:44.4	22 January 1955	Medeo
1500 m	2:41.7	9 February 1958	Kristinehamn

== Personal records ==
To put these personal records in perspective, the column WR lists the official world records on the dates that Görmer skated her personal records.

Event	Result	Date	Venue	WR
500 m	49.7	1 February 1960	Davos	45.6
1,000 m	1:39.6	31 January 1960	Davos	1:33.4
1,500 m	2:36.5	18 February 1960	Squaw Valley	2:25.2
3,000 m	5:31.6	20 January 1960	Davos	5:13.8
5,000 m	9:44.4	22 January 1955	Medeo	9:01.6
Mini combination	210.183	31 January 1960	Davos	196.416
Old combination	222.140	22 January 1955	Medeo	203.920
