= John Burritt =

American biathlete (1934–2015)

Personal information
- Born: June 23, 1934 Cedaredge, Colorado, United States
- Died: January 7, 2015 (aged 80) Cedaredge, Colorado, United States

Sport
- Sport: Biathlon

John Burritt (June 23, 1934 – January 7, 2015) was an American biathlete. He competed in the 20 km individual event at the 1960 Winter Olympics.
