= Gustav Hanson =

American biathlete (1934–2019)

Personal information
- Born: August 8, 1934 Honesdale, Pennsylvania, United States
- Died: April 1, 2019 (aged 84)

Sport
- Sport: Biathlon

Gustav Hanson (August 8, 1934 – April 1, 2019) was an American biathlete. He competed in the 20 km individual event at the 1960 Winter Olympics.
