= Ross Zucco =

American speed skater

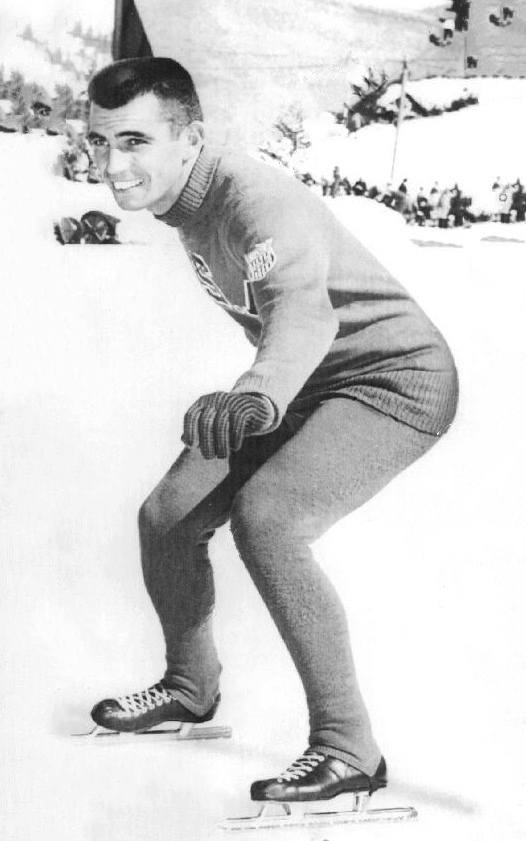
- Zucco in 1960

Personal information
- Born: April 20, 1934 South Gate, California, U.S.
- Died: September 28, 1960 (aged 26) Paramount, California, U.S.

Sport
- Sport: Speed skating
- Club: Midway SC, Saint Paul

Achievements and titles
- Personal bests: 500 m – 45.0 (1960); 1500 m – 2:21.9 (1960); 5000 m – 8:17.8 (1960); 10000 m – 16:37.6 (1960)

Ross Barta Zucco (April 20, 1934 – September 28, 1960) was an American speed skater. Ross trained at Iceland in Paramount CA in, what was then simply called "indoor speed skating." Later it would be known as Short Track Speed Skating. What was remarkable is that he was able to transfer that skill to skating on a much larger outdoor track and qualified to compete in the 10,000 m event at the 1960 Winter Olympics and finished in 10th place. A few months later he was killed in a car accident by a 16-year-old drunk driver.
