= Valery Kotov =

Soviet speed skater (1939–1993)

Personal information
- Nationality: Soviet
- Born: 8 March 1939 Kalinin (now Tver), USSR

Sport
- Sport: Speed skating

Valery Kotov (born 8 March 1939) was a Soviet speed skater. He competed in the men's 5000 metres event at the 1960 Winter Olympics.
