= René Mercier (biathlete) =

French biathlete (born 1937)

Personal information
- Nationality: French
- Born: 22 January 1937 (age 88); Sainte-Foy-Tarentaise, France

Sport
- Sport: Biathlon

René Mercier (born 22 January 1937) is a French biathlete. He competed in the 20 km individual event at the 1960 Winter Olympics.
