= Pentti Taskinen =

Finnish biathlete

Personal information
- Nationality: Finnish
- Born: 26 May 1929; Kuopio, Finland
- Died: 18 December 1973 (aged 44); Pohjois-Karjala, Finland

Sport
- Sport: Biathlon

Pentti Taskinen (26 May 1929 – 18 December 1973) was a Finnish biathlete. He competed in the 20 km individual event at the 1960 Winter Olympics.
