= Cornelia Harrington =

American speed skater

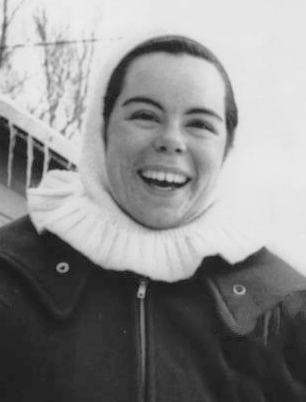
- Harrington in 1959

Personal information
- Born: June 7, 1943 (age 83) Tarrytown, New York, U.S.
- Height: 157 cm (5 ft 2 in)

Sport
- Sport: Speed skating

Achievements and titles
- Personal best: 3000 m – 5:57.5 (1960)

Cornelia Kelleher Harrington (born June 7, 1943) is a retired American speed skater. She competed in the 3000 m event at the 1960 Winter Olympics and placed 18th.
