= John Cress =

American Nordic combined skier (1935–2024)

Personal information
- Born: January 27, 1935 Clay County, Kentucky, U.S.
- Died: January 2, 2024 (aged 88) Redmond, Oregon, U.S.

Sport
- Sport: Nordic combined

John Cress (January 27, 1935 – January 2, 2024) was an American skier. He competed in the Nordic combined event at the 1960 Winter Olympics.
