= Kathy Mulholland =

American speed skater

Personal information
- Born: June 2, 1941; Bronx, New York, United States
- Died: July 9, 1989 (aged 48); Holmes, New York, United States

Sport
- Sport: Speed skating

Kathy Mulholland (June 2, 1941 – July 9, 1989) was an American speed skater. She competed in the women's 500 metres at the 1960 Winter Olympics.
