= Nikolajs Štelbaums =

Soviet speed skater

Nikolajs Štelbaums or Nikolay Shtelbaums (Russian: Николай Штельбаумс) (13 October 1933 Užava parish, Latvia – 3 April 2008 Omsk, Russia) was a Soviet speedskater. As a child he was forced to move to Siberia along with his family in 1949, in connection with the Soviet mass deportation project Operation Priboi of more than 90,000 Estonians, Latvians and Lithuanians. During his skating career he lived in Omsk, skating for Burevestnik.

In 1952, Norwegian skater Hjalmar Andersen set a legendary world record on the 10,000-m, with a time of 16:32.6. This record withstood several close attacks over the following seasons. The first skater to better the Andersen time was Štelbaums, who did 16:31.4 in Chelyabinsk on 4 February 1959. His result was not officially recognised by the International Skating Union, however, and therefore does not feature on the official world record lists.

On 31 January 1960 at Medeo, both Štelbaums (16:18.9) and Vladimir Shilykovskij (16:13.1) skated below Andersen's record time, at the traditional "Prize of the Soviet Ministry of the Kazakh Republic" competition; but again these world record times were not officially ratified by the ISU. At the 1960 Winter Olympics four weeks later, first Kjell Bäckman (16:14.2) and then Knut Johannesen (15:46.6) finally lowered the official Andersen world record, while Štelbaums was disqualified in this race.

Štelbaums participated in each of the Soviet-Russian allround championships from 1958 to 1963, with a 6th place from 1959 at Vologda his best result; on that occasion he also won the 10,000-m and bronze on the 5,000-m. He won silver on the 10,000-m twice, in 1958 at Sverdlovsk and in 1961 at Gorky. He was however never selected for international representation at allround championships.

His wife Vera Shtelbaums is a professional and merited Master of Sports coach of rhythmic gymnastics.
