= Vera Shtelbaums =

Russian rhythmic gymnastics coach (born 1937)

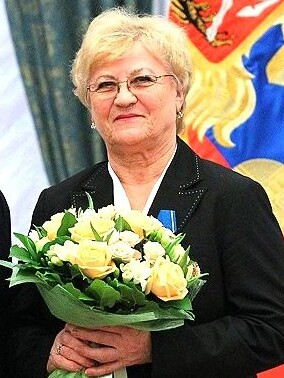
- Shtelbaums on February 22, 2013
- Born: April 24, 1937 (age 89); Omsk, RSFSR, USSR
- Education: Omsk Institute of Physical Education
- Occupation: Gymnastics coach
- Known for: Russian rhythmic gymnastics coach at Omsk State School of Olympic Reserve and in Novogorsk; coach of multiple Olympic and world champions
- Spouse: Nikolay Shtelbaums

Vera Shtelbaums (Russian: Вера Штельбаумс; born April 24, 1937, in Omsk, Russia) is a Russian rhythmic gymnastics coach.

== Coaching career ==
Following her graduation from the Omsk Institute of Physical Education in 1959, Shtelbaums worked as a head rhythmic gymnastics coach at the Omsk State School of Olympic Reserve. She remained in this position for over 25 years.

Shtelbaums has coached multiple Olympic and World Champions, notably Evgenia Kanaeva, Irina Tchachina and Ksenia Dudkina. She was the personal coach of Kanaeva since 2003 and Tchachina since 1993.

She is currently a member of the Presidium of the Russian Rhythmic Gymnastics Federation, and leads the Omsk regional center of rhythmic gymnastics. She is an Honored coach of Russia and Honored Worker of Physical Culture.

== Personal life ==
She has one daughter, Elena Arais, who is also a rhythmic gymnastics coach and choreographer. Her husband, Nikolay Shtelbaums, was a former Soviet speedskater.

== Notable trainees ==
She has trained multiple World and Olympic champions including:

- Evgenia Kanaeva - two time Olympic Champion (2008 Beijing and 2012 London) and three time all-around World Champion
- Irina Tchachina - 2004 Olympic silver medalist, two time all-around World bronze medalist
- Ksenia Dudkina - 2012 Olympics Group all-around gold medalist, European Group all-around champion
- Vera Biryukova - 2016 Olympics Group all-around gold medalist and multiple World Cup medals
- Maria Titova - 2013 Grand Prix Final all-around silver medalist
- Zarina Gizikova - World and European Team gold medalist
- Sofya Skomorokh - 2014 Youth Olympics Group all-around gold medalist, 2015 World Championship Group all-around gold medalist and 2015 European Games Group all-around gold medalist
- Anastasia Simakova - 2019 World Junior rope and team all-around champion
