= Vladimir Shilykovsky =

Soviet speed skater

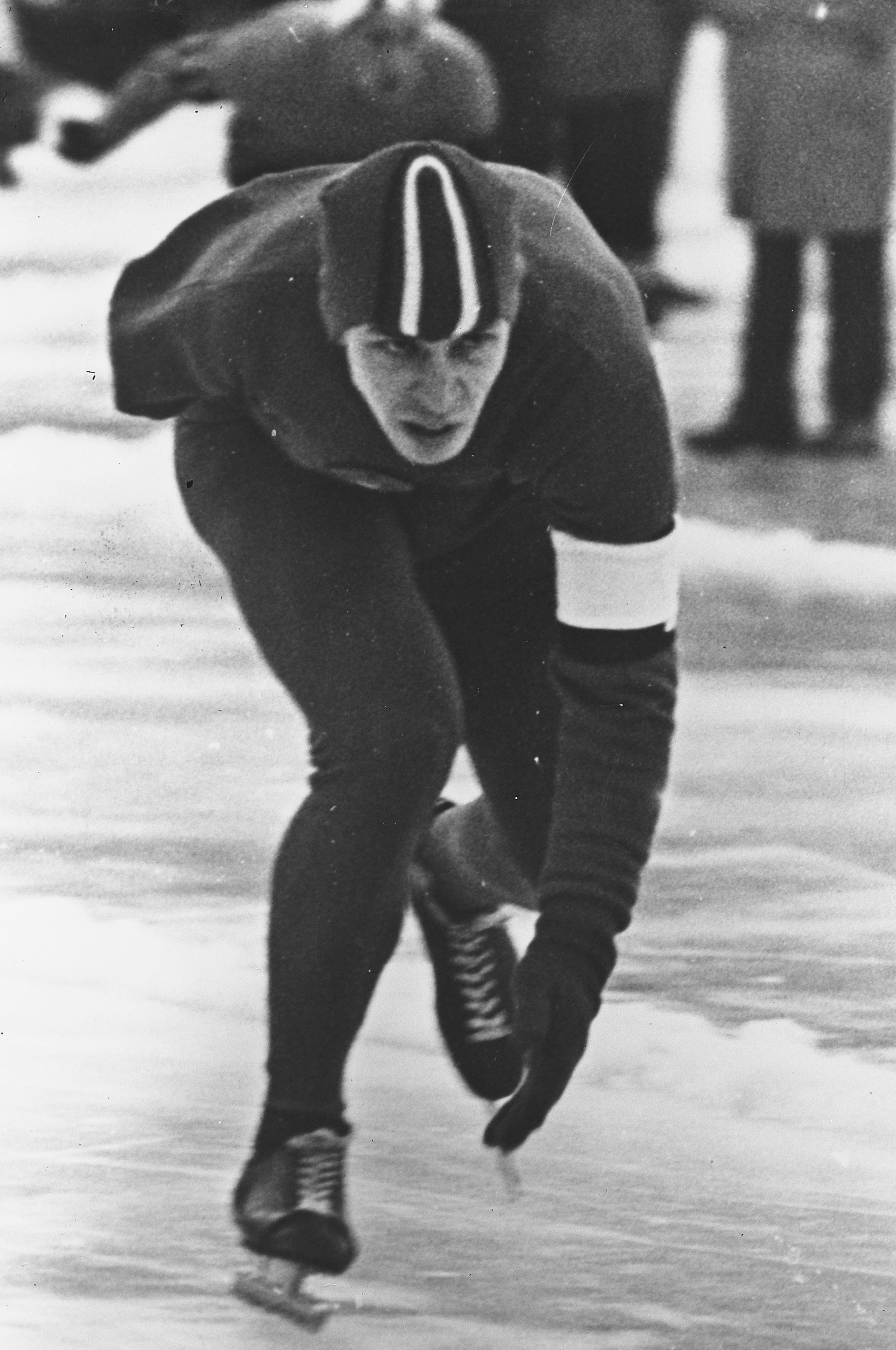
Vladimir Shilykovsky in 1958

Vladimir Sergeyevich Shilykovsky (Russian: Владимир Серге́евич Шилыковский) (3 April 1933 – 7 April 1987) was a Soviet/Russian speed skater.

Shilykovsky competed internationally from 1956 to 1960, and took part in two Winter Olympics, both times in the 10,000 m. His best season was 1958, when he won the overall silver medal in both the European Championships at Eskilstuna and in the World Championships at Helsinki, on both occasions trailing just behind Oleg Goncharenko. It is widely acknowledged that Shilykovsky had to skate the final 10,000 m distance in much less favourable conditions than Goncharenko, and Shilykovsky was seen as the "moral world champion" by the spectators and commentators.

At the start of the Olympic 1960 season, the world record on the 10,000 m was still the legendary 16:32.6 set in 1952 by Hjalmar Andersen (although Nikolay Shtelbaums had skated 16:31.4 in Chelyabinsk on 4 February 1959, a result not ratified by the International Skating Union (ISU)). On 31 January 1960 at Medeo, both Shtelbaums (16:18.9) and Shilykovsky (16:13.1) skated below Andersen's record time, at the traditional "Prize of the Soviet Ministry of the Kazakh Republic" competition; but again these world record times were not officially ratified by the ISU. At the 1960 Winter Olympics four weeks later, first Kjell Bäckman (16:14.2) and then Knut Johannesen (15:46.6) lowered the official world record, while Shilykovsky only managed a 20th place, skating in unfavourable conditions.

Shilykovsky's personal bests were 42.8 (500 m), 2:15.1 (1,500 m), 8:06.7 (5,000 m), in addition to the 16:13.1 (10,000 m).

Shilykovsky grew up in Vladimir but moved to Moskva for education and for sports. He became Moskva champion in 1955 and finished his master of sports degree the same year. He skated for Shakhter and later on for Spartak. He held a degree in technical sciences (кандидат технических наук) from 1969, and published scholarly articles in his field.

Shilykovsky was a highly unusual athlete by being able to compete at world top level in spite of a severe handicap; he lost his right arm when he was six months old as the result of an illness. This did not stop him taking part in all normal activities. In addition to his speed skating achievements, he was an accomplished swimmer and cyclist.
