= Gilbert Mercier =

French biathlete (born 1931)

Personal information
- Nationality: French
- Born: 2 March 1931; Sainte-Foy-Tarentaise, France

Sport
- Sport: Biathlon

Gilbert Mercier (born 2 March 1931) is a French former biathlete. He competed in the 20 km individual event at the 1960 Winter Olympics.
