= Craig Lussi =

American Nordic combined skier

Personal information
- Born: February 22, 1936 (age 90) Buffalo, New York, United States

Sport
- Sport: Nordic combined

Craig Lussi (born February 22, 1936) is an American skier. He competed in the Nordic combined event at the 1960 Winter Olympics.
