= Beverly Buhr =

American speed skater

Personal information
- Born: July 16, 1941 (age 83); Evanston, Illinois, United States

Sport
- Sport: Speed skating

Beverly Buhr (born July 16, 1941) is an American speed skater. She competed in the women's 3000 metres at the 1960 Winter Olympics.
