= Rudolf Dannhauer =

German cross-country skier (born 1934)

Personal information
- Nationality: German
- Born: 29 June 1934 (age 90); Wernigerode, Germany

Sport
- Sport: Cross-country skiing

Rudolf Dannhauer (born 29 June 1934) is a German cross-country skier. He competed at the 1960 Winter Olympics and the 1964 Winter Olympics.
