= Martin Körner =

German Nordic combined skier (born 1935)

Personal information
- Nationality: German
- Born: 30 December 1935 (age 90) Klingenthal, Germany

Sport
- Sport: Nordic combined

Martin Körner (born 30 December 1935) is a German former skier. He competed in the Nordic combined event at the 1960 Winter Olympics.
