= Werner Haase (skier) =

German cross-country skier (1934–2014)

Personal information
- Nationality: German
- Born: 23 February 1934 Benneckenstein, Germany
- Died: 15 November 2014 (aged 80) Berlin, Germany

Sport
- Sport: Cross-country skiing

Werner Haase (23 February 1934 – 15 November 2014) was a German cross-country skier. He competed in the men's 15 kilometre event at the 1960 Winter Olympics.
