= Rikio Yoshida =

Japanese Nordic combined skier

Personal information
- Nationality: Japanese
- Born: 14 September 1939 (age 85); Iwate, Japan

Sport
- Sport: Nordic combined

Rikio Yoshida (吉田 力雄, Yoshida Rikio, born 14 September 1939) is a Japanese skier. He competed in the Nordic combined event at the 1960 Winter Olympics.
