= Eero Laine (biathlete) =

Finnish biathlete

Personal information
- Nationality: Finnish
- Born: 7 January 1926; Tammela, Finland
- Died: 23 October 1998 (aged 72); Turku, Finland

Sport
- Sport: Biathlon

Eero Laine (7 January 1926 – 23 October 1998) was a Finnish biathlete. He competed in the 20 km individual event at the 1960 Winter Olympics.
