= Bill Carow =

American speed skater

William Ambrose Carow (June 9, 1924 – November 24, 2011) was an American speed skater who competed in the 1956 Winter Olympics and in the 1960 Winter Olympics. He was born in Duluth, Minnesota and died in Verona, Wisconsin.

In 1956 he finished sixth in the 500 metres event. Four years later he also competed in the 500 metres competition but did not finish the race.
