= Herbert Söllner =

German speed skater

Personal information
- Nationality: German
- Born: 24 September 1935 (age 89)

Sport
- Sport: Speed skating

Herbert Söllner (born 24 September 1935) was a German speed skater. He competed in the men's 500 metres event at the 1960 Winter Olympics.
