= Helmut Hagg =

German cross-country skier (born 1932)

Personal information
- Nationality: German
- Born: 24 May 1932 (age 92); Immenstadt im Allgäu, Germany

Sport
- Sport: Cross-country skiing

Helmut Hagg (born 24 May 1932) is a German cross-country skier. He competed at the 1956 Winter Olympics and the 1960 Winter Olympics.
