= Giuseppe Steiner (skier) =

Italian cross-country skier

Personal information
- Nationality: Italian
- Born: 23 August 1929; Prags, Italy
- Died: 4 January 2007 (aged 77)

Sport
- Sport: Cross-country skiing

Giuseppe Steiner (23 August 1929 – 1 April 2007) was an Italian cross-country skier. He competed at the 1960 Winter Olympics and the 1964 Winter Olympics.
