= Horst Nickel =

German biathlete (1934–2023)

Personal information
- Nationality: German
- Born: 4 March 1934; Oberhof, Germany
- Died: 10 February 2023 (aged 88)

Sport
- Sport: Biathlon

Horst Nickel (4 March 1934 – 10 February 2023) was a German biathlete. He competed in the 20 km individual event at the 1960 Winter Olympics.
