= Herbert Kirchner =

German biathlete

Personal information
- Nationality: German
- Born: 16 May 1937 (age 87); Lauscha, Germany

Sport
- Sport: Biathlon

Herbert Kirchner (born 16 May 1937) is a German former biathlete. He competed in the 20 km individual event at the 1960 Winter Olympics.
