= Kurt Hinze =

German biathlete

Personal information
- Nationality: German
- Born: 13 October 1934 (age 90); Elbingerode, Germany

Sport
- Sport: Biathlon

Kurt Hinze (born 13 October 1934) is a German biathlete. He competed in the 20 km individual event at the 1960 Winter Olympics.
