= Sepp Biebl =

German speed skater (1936–2026)

Personal information
- Full name: Josef Biebl
- Nationality: German
- Born: 30 December 1936 Munich, Gau Munich-Upper Bavaria, Germany
- Died: 3 July 2026 (aged 89)

Sport
- Sport: Speed skating

Josef "Sepp" Biebl (30 December 1936 – 3 July 2026) was a German speed skater. He competed in the men's 5000 metres event at the 1960 Winter Olympics. Biebl died on 3 July 2026, at the age of 89.
