= Günter Flauger =

German Nordic combined skier

Personal information
- Nationality: German
- Born: 9 August 1936 (age 88); Klingenthal, Germany

Sport
- Sport: Nordic combined

Günter Flauger (born 9 August 1936) is a German former skier. He competed in the Nordic combined event at the 1960 Winter Olympics.
