= Martti Ingman =

Finnish diplomat (1907–1989)

Martti Johannes Ingman (1907–1989) was a Finnish diplomat. He held a Master of Arts degree. Between 1956 and 1963 he first served as Envoy, then ambassador to Rio de Janeiro, Warsaw from 1963 to 1967 as ambassador, as well as Budapest 1969-1973. His father was Prime Minister and Archbishop Lauri Ingman.
