= Mikhail Pryakin =

Soviet Olympic Nordic combined skier

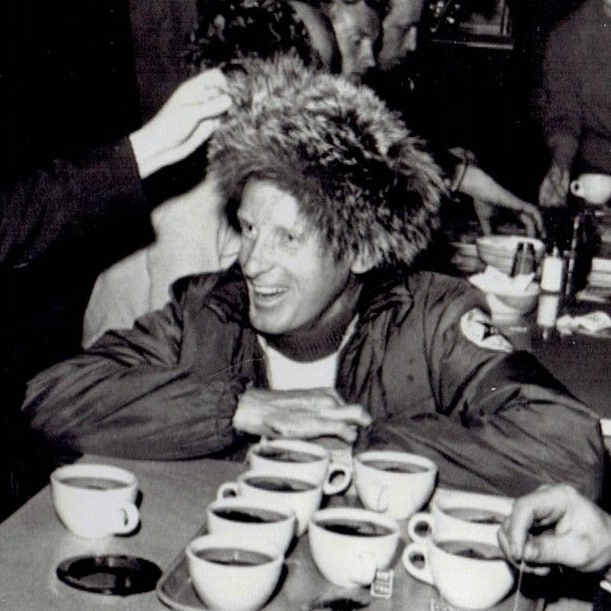
- Pryakin at the 1960 Olympics

Personal information
- Born: October 3, 1935 (age 89); Tambov, Russian SFSR, Soviet Union

Sport
- Sport: Nordic combined

Mikhail Maksimovich Pryakin (Russian: Михаил Максимович Пряхин, born October 3, 1935) was a former Soviet Nordic combined skier. He competed most notably at the 1960 Winter Olympics in Sqaw Valley, California where he finished in 12th place.

Pryakin won two national titles in the Nordic combined, and was a member of the Soviet national team in 1957–1965. In retirement he worked as a skiing coach in Moscow.

== Notable competitions ==
- 1960 Winter Olympics – Nordic combined – 12th place
- 1964 Winter Olympics – Nordic combined – DNS
