= Knut Johannesen =

Norwegian speed skater

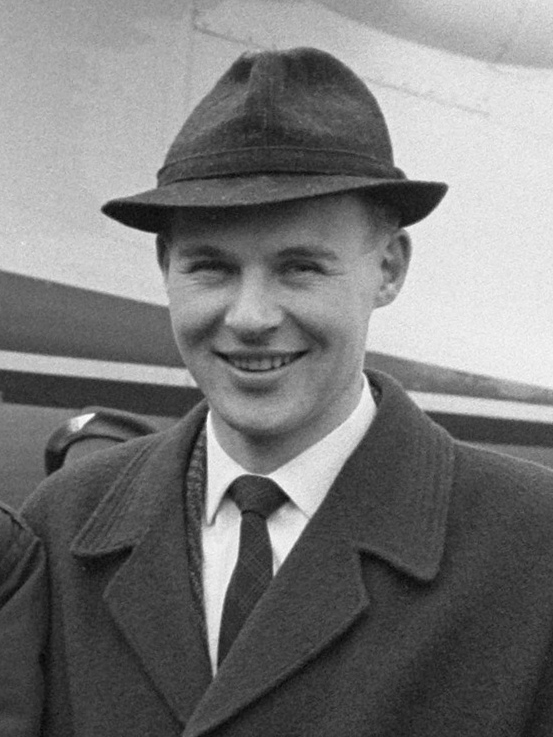
- Knut Johannesen in 1962

Personal information
- Nickname: Kupper'n
- Nationality: Norwegian
- Born: 6 November 1933 (age 92) Oslo, Norway
- Height: 1.83 m (6 ft 0 in)
- Weight: 85 kg (187 lb)

Sport
- Country: Norway
- Sport: Speed skating
- Club: Aktiv SK, Oslo

Achievements and titles
- Personal bests: 500 m: 42.3 (1960); 1000 m: 1:31.0 (1954); 1500 m: 2:09.4 (1963); 3000 m: 4:28.7 (1964); 5000 m: 7:37,8 (1963); 10 000 m: 15:42.9 (1964)
Medal record
Representing Norway
Olympic Games
| Gold medal – first place | 1960 Squaw Valley | 10,000 m |
| Gold medal – first place | 1964 Innsbruck | 5,000 m |
| Silver medal – second place | 1956 Cortina d'Ampezzo | 10,000 m |
| Silver medal – second place | 1960 Squaw Valley | 5,000 m |
| Bronze medal – third place | 1964 Innsbruck | 10,000 m |
World Speed Skating Championships
| Gold medal – first place | 1957 Östersund | All-round |
| Silver medal – second place | 1963 Karuizawa | All-round |
| Gold medal – first place | 1964 Helsinki | All-round |
European Speed Skating Championships
| Silver medal – second place | 1956 Heksinki | All-round |
| Silver medal – second place | 1957 Oslo | All-round |
| Bronze medal – third place | 1958 Eskilstuna | All-round |
| Gold medal – first place | 1959 Gothenburg | All-round |
| Gold medal – first place | 1960 Oslo | All-round |
| Silver medal – second place | 1963 Gothenburg | All-round |

Knut ("Kupper'n") Johannesen (born 6 November 1933) is a former speed skater from Norway.

== Biography ==
Born in Oslo and representing the skating club ASK (Arbeidernes Skøyteklubb – later called Aktiv Skøyteklubb) Johannesen won the World Allround Championships in 1957 and 1964, the European Allround Championships in 1959 and 1960, and won the Norwegian Allround Championships eight times (1955 and 1957–1963). He was Olympic Champion twice – on the 10,000 m at the 1960 Winter Olympics in Squaw Valley and on the 5,000 m at the 1964 Winter Olympics in Innsbruck. He led the Adelskalender for a total of 1,100 days. For his achievements, he received the 1959 Oscar Mathisen Award and was elected Norwegian Sportsperson of the Year in 1960.

Johannesen also set a total of four world records over the course of his career, the most famous of which was his 15:46.6 on the 10,000 m at the 1960 Olympics. The Soviet-Russian skaters Nikolay Shtelbaums and Vladimir Shilykovsky had earlier improved on the equally famous 1952 world record 16.32.6 of Hjalmar Andersen, but his time of 15:46.6, along with Kjell Bäckman's time of 16:14.2 from an earlier pair, was the first officially recognised world record achievement since 1952.

Beside skating, Johannesen worked as a carpenter and later ran a gas station.

== Records ==
=== World records ===
Over the course of his career, Johannesen skated four world records:

| Discipline | Time | Date | Location |
|---|---|---|---|
| 10,000 m | 15.46,6 | 27 February 1960 | Squaw Valley |
| 3000 m | 4.33,9 | 12 January 1963 | Tønsberg |
| Big combination | 183.035 | 20 January 1963 | Hamar |
| 5000 m | 7.37,8 | 26 January 1963 | Oslo |

Source: SpeedSkatingStats.com

=== Personal records ===
To put these personal records in perspective, the column WR lists the official world records on the dates that Johannesen skated his personal records.

| Event | Result | Date | Venue | WR |
|---|---|---|---|---|
| 500 m | 42.3 | 24 February 1960 | Squaw Valley | 40.2 |
| 1,000 m | 1:31.0 | 2 February 1954 | Davos | 1:28.4 |
| 1,500 m | 2:09.4 | 24 February 1963 | Karuizawa | 2:06.3 |
| 3,000 m | 4:28.7 | 11 February 1964 | Oslo | 4:27.6 |
| 5,000 m | 7:37.8 | 26 January 1963 | Oslo | 7:45.6 |
| 10,000 m | 15:42.9 | 19 January 1964 | Oslo | 15:33.0 |

Johannesen has an Adelskalender score of 178.358 points. He held first place on the Adelskalender for a total of 1,100 days during two periods between 1960 and 1964.

Awards
| Preceded by None | Oscar Mathisen Award; 1959 | Succeeded by (Soviet Union) Boris Stenin |
| Preceded by (Norway) Torbjørn Yggeseth | Norwegian Sportsperson of the Year; 1960 | Succeeded by (Norway) Harald Grønningen |
