= Eiji Kurita =

Japanese cross-country skier (born 1938)

Personal information
- Nationality: Japanese
- Born: 7 February 1938 (age 87); Yamagata, Japan

Sport
- Sport: Cross-country skiing

Eiji Kurita (born 7 February 1938) is a Japanese cross-country skier. He competed in the men's 15 kilometre event at the 1960 Winter Olympics.
