= Martti Kykkling =

Finnish farmer and politician

Martti Kykkling (7 May 1857, Säkkijärvi – 28 September 1917) was a Finnish farmer and politician. He was a member of the Diet of Finland from 1899 to 1906 and of the Parliament of Finland from 1913 to 1916, representing the Young Finnish Party.
