= Enno Röder =

German cross-country skier (1935–2019)

Personal information
- Nationality: German
- Born: 16 December 1935; Klingenthal, Germany
- Died: 4 October 2019 (aged 83)

Sport
- Sport: Cross-country skiing

Enno Röder (16 December 1935 – 4 October 2019) was a German cross-country skier. He competed at the 1960 Winter Olympics and the 1964 Winter Olympics.
