= Takashi Matsuhashi =

Japanese cross-country skier (born 1932)

Personal information
- Nationality: Japanese
- Born: 26 October 1932 (age 94) Niigata, Japan

Sport
- Sport: Cross-country skiing

Takashi Matsuhashi (松橋 高司, Matsuhashi Takashi; born 26 October 1932) is a Japanese cross-country skier. He competed in the men's 15 kilometre event at the 1960 Winter Olympics.
