= Martti Meinilä =

Finnish biathlete

Personal information
- Nationality: Finnish
- Born: 10 November 1927; Salla, Finland
- Died: 2005 (aged 77–78)

Sport
- Sport: Biathlon

Martti Meinilä (10 November 1927 – 2005) was a Finnish biathlete. He competed in the 20 km individual event at the 1960 Winter Olympics.
