= Netherlands at the 1960 Winter Olympics =

- Flag of the Netherlands
- IOC code: NED (NET used at these Games)
- NOC: Dutch Olympic Committee

in Squaw Valley
- Competitors: 7 (5 men, 2 women) in 2 sports
- Flag bearer: Kees Broekman (speed skating)
- Medals Ranked 11th: Gold 0 Silver 1 Bronze 1 Total 2

Winter Olympics appearances (overview)
- 1928; 1932; 1936; 1948; 1952; 1956; 1960; 1964; 1968; 1972; 1976; 1980; 1984; 1988; 1992; 1994; 1998; 2002; 2006; 2010; 2014; 2018; 2022; 2026

Athletes from the Netherlands competed at the 1960 Winter Olympics in Squaw Valley, United States.

== Medalists ==
| Medal | Name | Sport | Event |
|---|---|---|---|
| Silver | Sjoukje Dijkstra | Figure skating | Ladies' singles |
| Bronze | Jan Pesman | Speed skating | Men's 5000 metres |

== Figure skating ==
| Athlete | Event | CF | FS | Points | Places | Final rank |
|---|---|---|---|---|---|---|
| Sjoukje Dijkstra | Women's singles | 2 | 3 | 1424.8 | 20 | 2nd place, silver medalist(s) |
| Joan Haanappel | Women's singles | 4 | 7 | 1331.9 | 52 | 5 |

== Speed skating ==
Men

| Event | Athlete | Race | |
| Event | Athlete | Time | Rank |
|---|---|---|---|
| 500 m | Wim de Graaff | 42.9 | 28 |
| 500 m | Henk van der Grift | 41.2 | 10 |
| 500 m | Jan Pesman | 43.4 | 33 |
| 1500 m | Wim de Graaff | 2:16.5 | 15 |
| 1500 m | Henk van der Grift | DNF | – |
| 5000 m | Jeen van den Berg | 8:22.4 | 19 |
| 5000 m | Kees Broekman | 8:22.9 | 20 |
| 5000 m | Jan Pesman | 8:05.1 | 3rd place, bronze medalist(s) |
| 10,000 m | Jeen van den Berg | 17:23.5 | 22 |
| 10,000 m | Kees Broekman | 16:59.9 | 16 |
| 10,000 m | Jan Pesman | 16:41.0 | 12 |
