= Pompeo Fattor =

Italian cross-country skier (1933–2009)

Personal information
- Nationality: Italian
- Born: 14 December 1933; Zoldo Alto, Italy
- Died: 5 May 2009 (aged 75); Belluno, Italy

Sport
- Sport: Cross-country skiing

Pompeo Fattor (14 December 1933 – 5 May 2009) was an Italian cross-country skier. He competed at the 1956 Winter Olympics and the 1960 Winter Olympics.
