= Martti Maatela =

Finnish Nordic combined skier

Personal information
- Nationality: Finnish
- Born: 21 September 1935; Rovaniemi, Finland
- Died: 26 November 2013 (aged 78)

Sport
- Sport: Nordic combined

Martti Maatela (21 September 1935 – 26 November 2013) was a Finnish skier. He competed in the Nordic combined event at the 1960 Winter Olympics.
