= Giulio de Florian =

Medal record

Men's cross-country skiing

Representing Italy

World Championships
| Bronze medal – third place | 1962 Zakopane | 30 km |
| Bronze medal – third place | 1966 Oslo | 4 x 10 km |

Giulio De Florian (Ziano di Fiemme 13 January 1936 – Ziano di Fiemme 17 February 2010) was an Italian cross-country skier who competed during the 1960s. He won two bronze medals at the FIS Nordic World Ski Championships, earning one in 1962 (30 km) and the other in 1966 (4 x 10 km).

De Florian also finished fifth in the 30 km event at the 1968 Winter Olympics in Grenoble.

Further notable results:

- 1959: 1st, Italian men's championships of cross-country skiing, 15 km
- 1960: 1st, Italian men's championships of cross-country skiing, 30 km
- 1961:
  - 1st, Italian men's championships of cross-country skiing, 50 km
  - 1st, Italian men's championships of cross-country skiing, 30 km
  - 2nd, Italian men's championships of cross-country skiing, 15 km
- 1962:
  - 1st, Italian men's championships of cross-country skiing, 30 km
  - 2nd, Italian men's championships of cross-country skiing, 50 km
- 1964: 2nd, Italian men's championships of cross-country skiing, 15 km
- 1965:
  - 1st, Italian men's championships of cross-country skiing, 50 km
  - 2nd, Italian men's championships of cross-country skiing, 30 km
  - 3rd, Italian men's championships of cross-country skiing, 15 km
- 1966: 2nd, Italian men's championships of cross-country skiing, 15 km
- 1967:
  - 1st, Italian men's championships of cross-country skiing, 15 km
  - 3rd, Italian men's championships of cross-country skiing, 50 km
  - 3rd, Italian men's championships of cross-country skiing, 30 km
