= Takashi Matsui =

Japanese ski jumper

Personal information
- Nationality: Japanese
- Born: 27 February 1940 (age 85); Hokkaido, Japan

Sport
- Sport: Ski jumping

Takashi Matsui (born 27 February 1940) is a Japanese ski jumper. He competed in the individual event at the 1960 Winter Olympics.
