= Kuno Werner =

German skier (1925–2004)

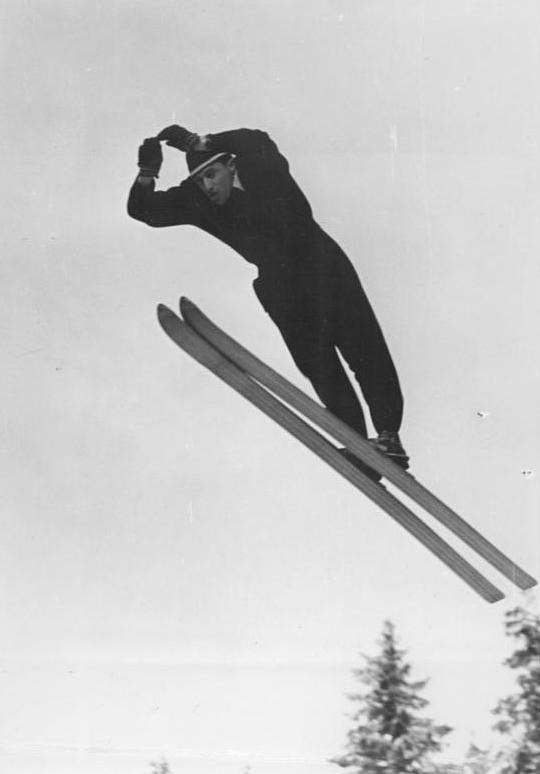
- Kuno Werner in 1953

Personal information
- Nationality: German
- Born: 10 May 1925; Suhl, Germany
- Died: 8 September 2004 (aged 79)

Sport
- Sport: Biathlon

Kuno Werner (10 May 1925 – 8 September 2004) was a German skier. He competed at the 1956 Winter Olympics and the 1960 Winter Olympics.
