= Helga Haase =

German speed skater (1934–1989)

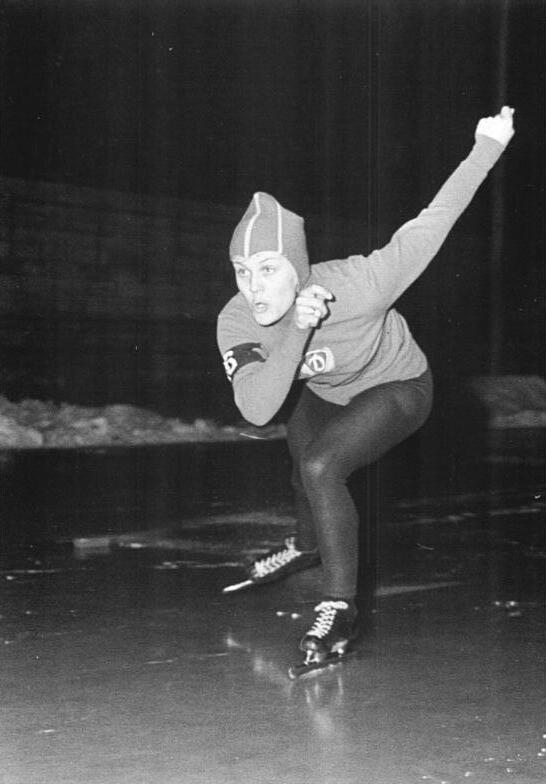
- Haase in action during the 1967 East German Championships

Personal information
- Full name: Helga Haase-Obschernitzki
- Born: 9 June 1934 Danzig, Free City of Danzig (now Gdańsk, Poland)
- Died: 16 June 1989 (aged 55) East Berlin, East Germany
- Occupation: Major of the Volkspolizei

Sport
- Sport: Speed skating
- Club: SC Dynamo Berlin
Medal record
Women's speed skating
Representing Germany
Olympic Games
Gold medal – first place	1960 Squaw Valley	500 m
Silver medal – second place	1960 Squaw Valley	1000 m

Helga Haase (née Obschernitzki; 9 June 1934 – 16 June 1989) was a speed skater in East Germany. She was born in Danzig and died in East Berlin.

== Career ==
Haase's career began 1952, when she introduced herself at 18 years at the SC Dynamo Berlin, which looked for high-speed ice skaters to the world and married thereupon her coach Helmut Haase.

From 1957 to 1967, Haase (hare) reached 15 GDR master skating titles on separate distances (Einzelstrecken), an additional seven titles in combination results (samalog, or Mehrkampf in German) and a further four on a very small indoor rink (Kleinbahn), a fore-runner of present indoor short track skating.

=== 1960 Winter Olympics ===
In preparation for the Olympic Winter Games of 1960, she went to Davos with the ladies of the unified German team and broke the multi-combination world record in Davos, Switzerland. With the 1960 Winter Olympics in Squaw Valley, she won, as the first German speed skater and as the first sportswoman of the GDR, a gold medal at the Olympic Winter Games, the gold medal over 500 m. That medal also was the first Olympic medal for any woman in speed skating, as it was not before on the Olympic program. She also won the silver medal over 1000 m and finished at a respectable 8th place over 1500 m, and all of this despite the prohibition of the entry for her husband/coach.

=== 1964 Winter Olympics ===
In the Olympic season of 1964, she won a fourth place in the 1000 m and a fifth place over 1500 m with the Olympic Games in Innsbruck. In the course of her career, Haase skated 23 German records.

=== Post-career ===
In 1978, her grandson Robert Haase was born. Starting from 1984 she retired because of disablement. She worked also in the central guidance of the Sportvereinigung Dynamo.

== Gallery ==
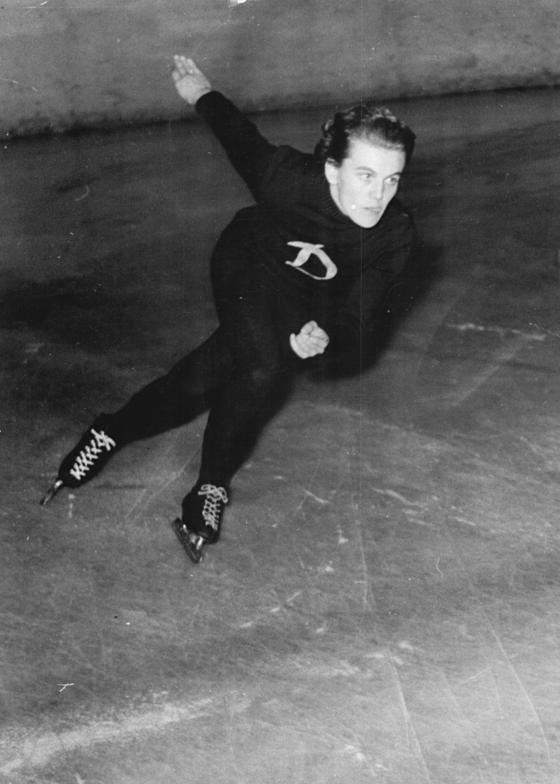
Helga Haase indoor in action in 1958 at the Werner-Seelenbinder-Halle in Berlin

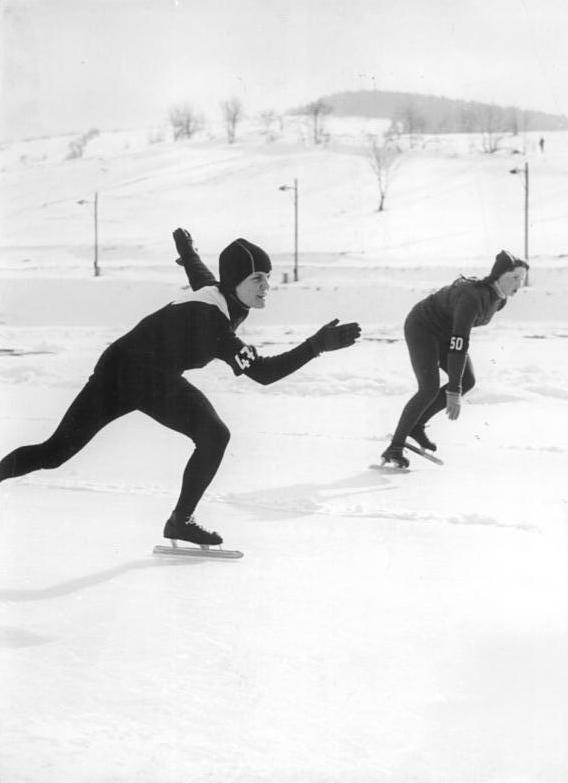
Helga Haase and Siegrid Behrenz during the 1958 East-German Championships at Geising

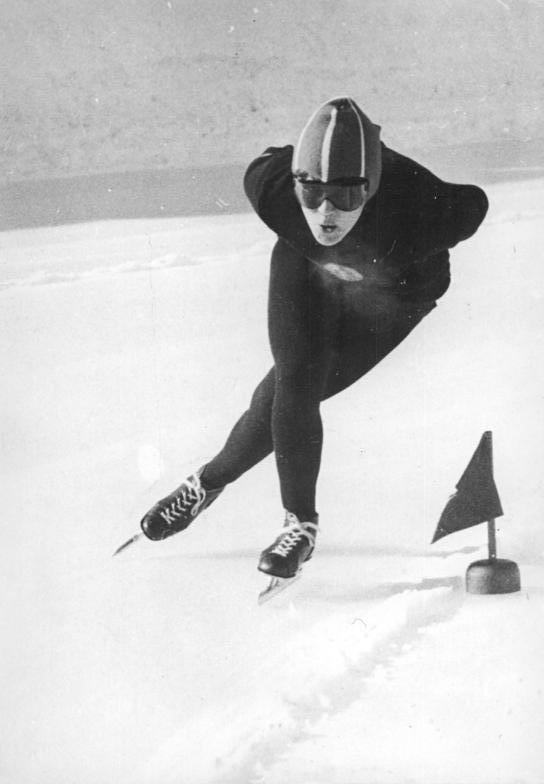
Helga Haase in action during the 1960 Winter Olympics

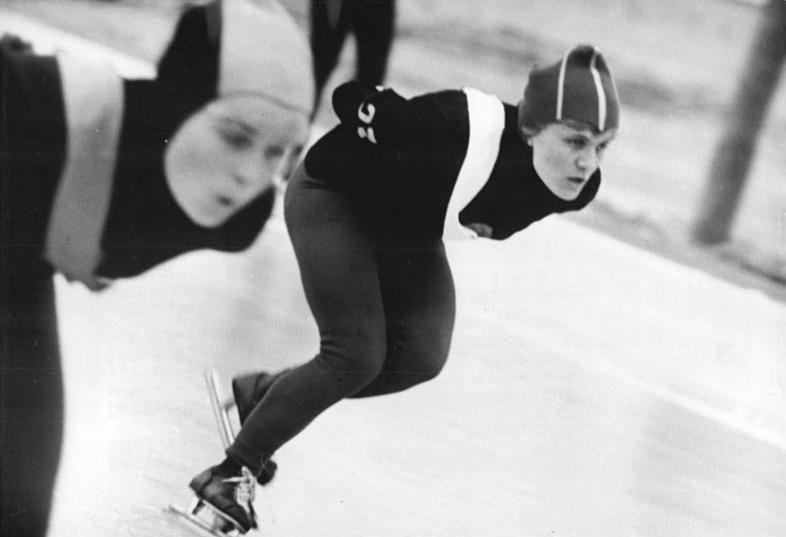
Helga Haase and Gisela Manns during the East-German 1963 Championships in Berlin

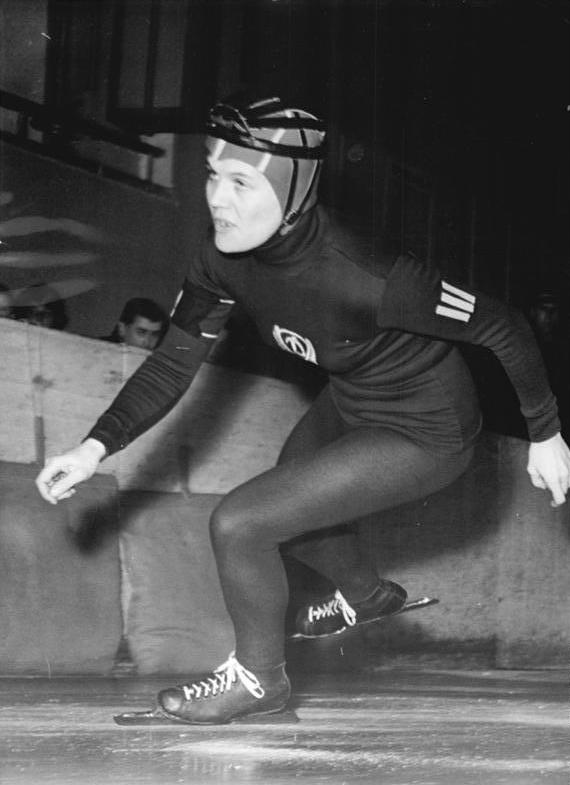
Helga Haase indoor in action, with helmet, 1963

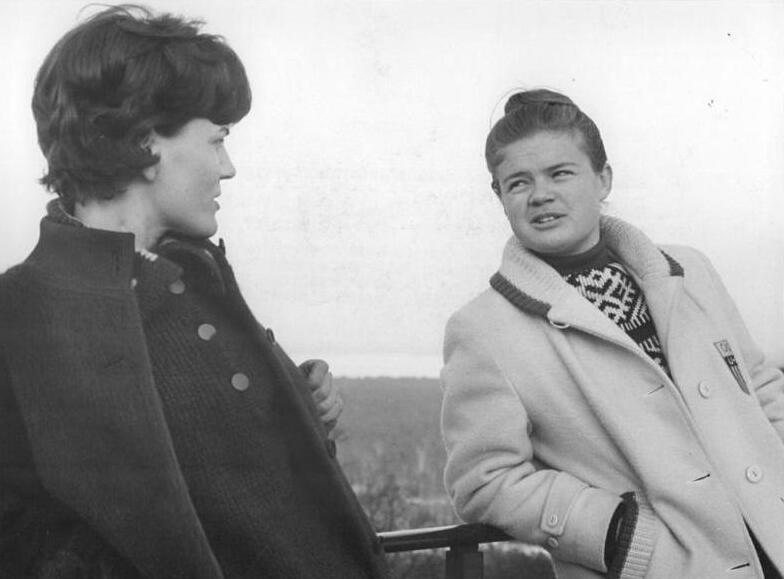
Helga Haase together with US speed skater Sylvia White, 1964

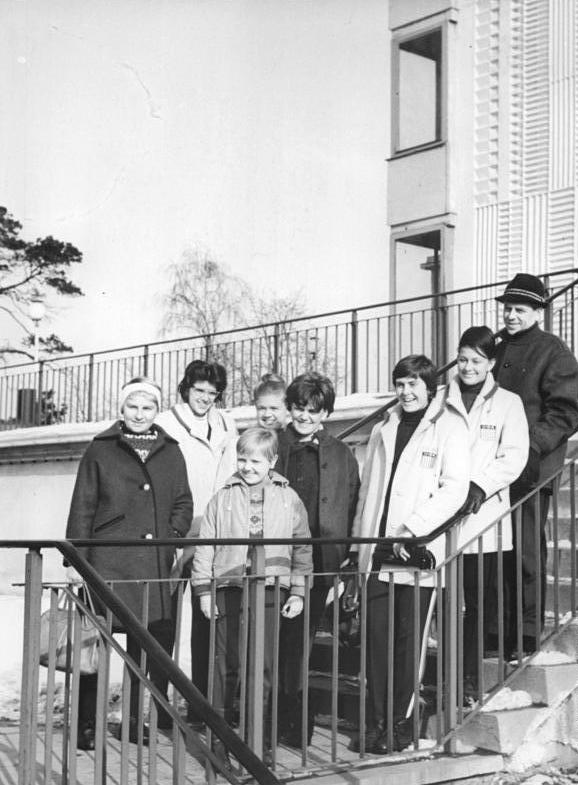
Helga Haase and the US women's Olympic speed skating team 1964

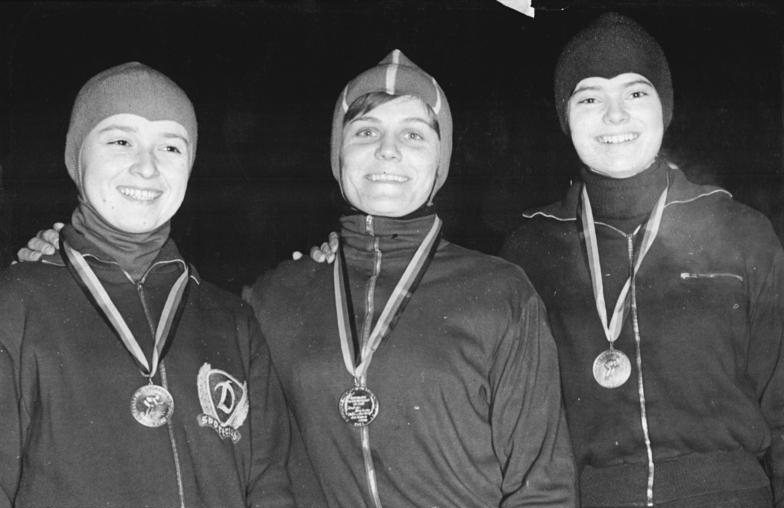
Helga Ratki, Helga Haase and Herlind Hürdler, 1965

== Records ==
World records
Distance	Result	Location	Date
mini combination	202.834	Davos	20 January 1960

Personal records
Distance	Result	Location	Date
500 m	45.9	Squaw Valley	20 February 1960
1,000 m	1:34.3	Squaw Valley	22 February 1960
1,500 m	2:28.6	Innsbruck	31 January 1964
3,000 m	5:19.7	Berlin	1 March 1964
mini combination	200.516	Davos	30/31 January 1960

East-German records
Distance	Result	Location	Date
1,000 m	1:42.5	Zakopane	9 March 1958
500 m	49.5	Medeo	25 January 1959
1500 m	2:39.1	Medeo	25 January 1959
1000 m	1:41.5	Medeo	26 January 1959
mini combination	210.116	Medeo	26 January 1959
500 m	47.3	Medeo	31 January 1959
1000 m	1:37.7	Medeo	2 February 1959
1500 m	2:37.1	Jekatrinburg	28 February 1959
500 m	47.0	Davos	8 January 1960
1000 m	1:37.4	Davos	14 January 1960
1500 m	2:33.8	Davos	19 January 1960
3000 m	5:31.0	Davos	20 January 1960
mini combination	202.834	Davos	20 January 1960
500 m	46.8	Davos	30 January 1960
1500 m	2:33.4	Davos	30 January 1960
1000 m	1:35.4	Davos	31 January 1960
3000 m	5:29.3	Davos	31 January 1960
mini combination	200.516	Davos	31 January 1960
500 m	45.9	Squaw Valley	20 February 1960
1500 m	2:31.7	Squaw Valley	21 February 1960
1000 m	1:34.3	Squaw Valley	22 February 1960
1500 m	2:28.6	Innsbruck	31 January 1960
3,000 m	5:19.7	Berlin	1 March 1964
