= Rainer Dietel =

German skier (1937–2021)

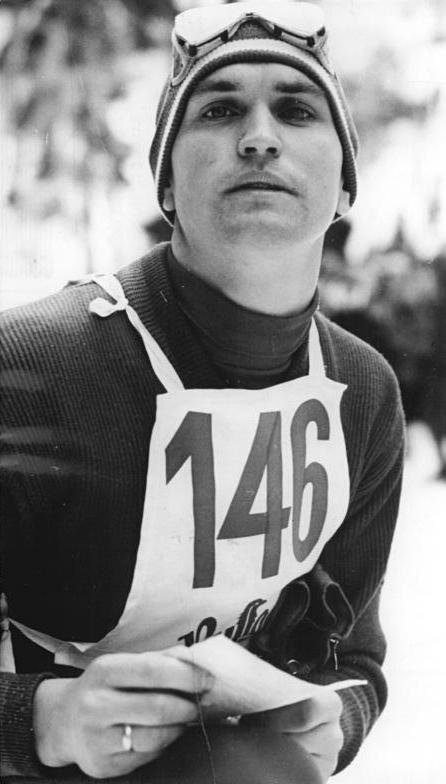
- Dietel in 1963

Personal information
- Born: 15 April 1937; Sayda, Germany
- Died: 12 May 2021 (aged 84)

Sport
- Sport: Nordic combined

Rainer Dietel (15 April 1937 – 12 May 2021) was a German skier. He competed in the Nordic combined events at the 1960 Winter Olympics and the 1964 Winter Olympics.
