= Günter Tilch =

German speed skater

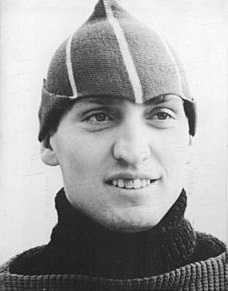
- Günther Tilch in 1964

Personal information
- Born: May 4, 1937 (age 89) Berlin, Germany
- Height: 1.82 m (6 ft 0 in)
- Weight: 78 kg (172 lb)

Sport
- Sport: Speed skating
- Club: SC Turbine Erfurt; SC Dynamo Berlin

Günter Tilch (also Günther Tilch, born 4 May 1937) is a retired German speed skater. He competed at the 1960 and 1964 Winter Olympics in the 500 m and 1500 m events. His best achievement was 20th place in 500 m in 1960.

He was on the podium of national championships in 1964–1967, but never won them.

Personal bests:

- 500 m – 41.8 (1963)
- 1500 m – 2:15.6 (1963)
- 5000 m – 8:35.0 (1965)
- 10000 m – 17:42.3 (1965)
