= Martti Mertanen =

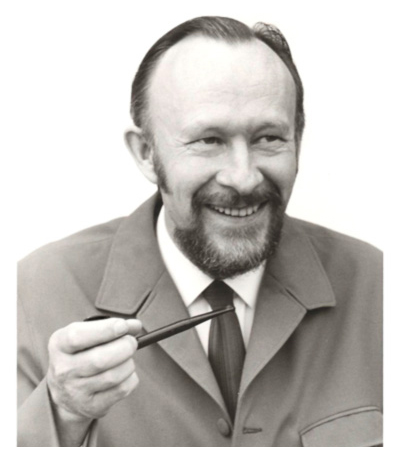
Martti Mertanen around 1975.

Martti Johannes Mertanen (May 31, 1925 – April 21, 2001) was a Finnish artist and educator active in Hämeenlinna, Finland.

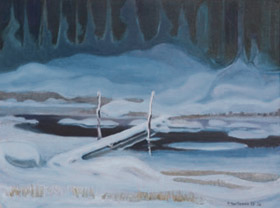
Martti Mertanen: The Duckboards, oil on canvas, 1975–76. The duckboards had a strong symbolic meaning, we all have to cross difficult times in our lives.

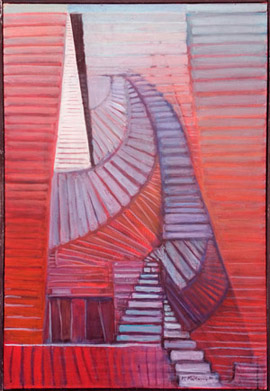
Martti Mertanen: The Stairs of Life. Oil on canvas. 70 cm × 100 cm.

Mertanen was born in Eastern Finland, Polvijärvi in 1925. He was fighting as a soldier of the Finnish military in the wars between Finland and the Soviet Union during 1939–1944. This period left many gruesome memories which had some impact on his artistic style later. Many of his winter landscapes had somewhat melancholic style. Mertanen lived in Hämeenlinna, Finland during 1956–2001 and was an active member of the artists' association of Hämeenlinna. He was among the first active artists in this local artists' association. Mertanen was well known professional teacher and artist locally and his paintings were exhibited in numerous Hämeenlinna Artists' Association's juried exhibitions held at the Hämeenlinna Art Museum since 1973. His works were also exhibited for example at the Union of Finnish Art Associations' annual exhibitions in 1976, 1985 and in joint exhibition in 1979. Other numerous exhibitions included Modern Art of Häme Art Exhibition in 1979 and participation in exhibitions in Germany, Poland, The Soviet Union and Sweden. Mertanen was also an active member of the Artists' Association ARS Häme. He acted as the secretary of the association for several years. The circle of artist friends included many known Finnish painters like professor Taisto Ahtola, artist Juhani Palmu, artist Egon Meuronen, artist Pentti Pullinen and artist Mikko Mikkola to name a few.

His paintings can be found for example in public collections of The City of Hämeenlinna (Finland), The City of Celle (Germany), The Municipality of Polvijärvi (Finland) and the OKO Bank of Finland.

== Artistic production ==
Martti Mertanen's production comprises mainly oil paintings from the 1970s until his death in 2001. At first his style was more realistic focusing especially on Finnish landscapes. Later in 1980s and in 1990s he experimented on more colourful and even surrealistic topics. Subjects included abstract depictions as well as wilder use of colours.

== Education and academic career ==
Martti Mertanen held Bachelor of Arts (Education) degree and he was a professional teacher of English and Art for about 40 years.

Information about Martti Mertanen: Book reference: Miilumäki, Kirsti; Vartiainen, Liisa: Taiteilijan muotokuva : Hämeenlinnan taiteilijaseura 1948-1998, Publisher: Hämeenlinnan taiteilijaseura [1998]
