= Akemi Taniguchi =

Japanese cross-country skier (born 1937)

Personal information
- Nationality: Japanese
- Born: 8 July 1937 (age 87); Hokkaido, Japan

Sport
- Sport: Cross-country skiing

Akemi Taniguchi (谷口 明見, Taniguchi Akemi, born 8 July 1937) is a Japanese cross-country skier. He competed at the 1960 Winter Olympics, the 1964 Winter Olympics and the 1968 Winter Olympics.
