= Manfred Schüler (speed skater) =

German speed skater

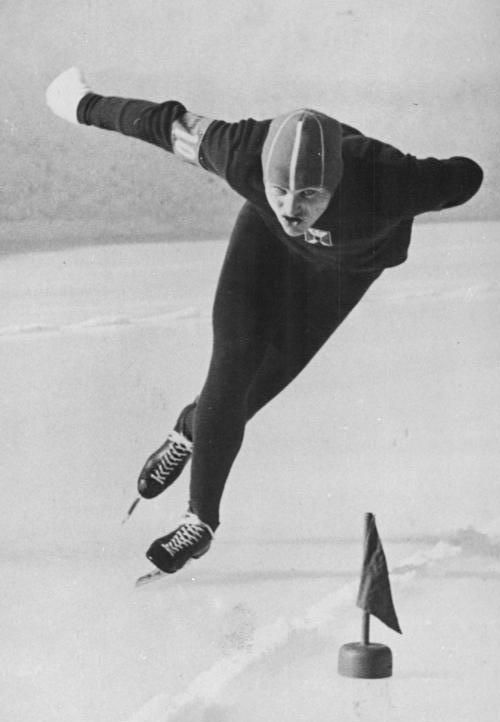
- Manfred Schüler in 1960

Personal information
- Born: 30 March 1935
- Died: 2001 (aged approximately 66)

Sport
- Sport: Speed skating
- Club: SC Einheit Berlin, Ost Berlin

Manfred Schüler (30 March 1935 – 2001) was a German speed skater. He competed at the 1960 Winter Olympics in the 500 m and 1500 m events and finished in 24th and 18th place, respectively.

Personal bests:

- 500 m – 41.6 (1973)
- 1500 m – 2:16.1 (1960)
- 5000 m – 8:37.5 (1961)
- 10000 m – 18:32.3 (1962)
