= Fumio Nagakubo =

Japanese speed skater (born 1937)

Personal information
- Nationality: Japanese
- Born: 23 February 1937 (age 88); Yamanashi Prefecture, Japan

Sport
- Sport: Speed skating

Fumio Nagakubo (born 23 February 1937) is a Japanese speed skater. He competed at the 1960 Winter Olympics and the 1964 Winter Olympics.
