= Heinz Wolfram =

German speed skater (1935–2022)

Personal information
- Nationality: German
- Born: 17 January 1935; Greisitz, Lower Silesia, Prussia, Germany
- Died: 10 June 2022 (aged 87)

Sport
- Sport: Speed skating

Heinz Wolfram (17 January 1935 – 10 June 2022) was a German speed skater. He competed in two events at the 1960 Winter Olympics.
