= Gisela Toews =

German speed skater

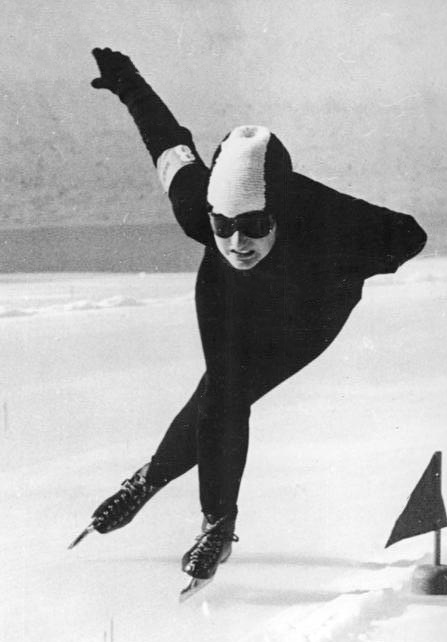
- Gisela Toews in 1960

Personal information
- Born: 27 September 1940 (age 85)

Sport
- Sport: Speed skating
- Club: SC Wismut Karl-Marx-Stadt, Chemnitz

Gisela Toews (born 27 September 1940) is a retired German speed skater. She competed at the 1960 Winter Olympics in the 1500 m and 3000 m events and finished in 22nd and 17th place, respectively.

Personal bests:

- 500 m – 52.2 (1960)
- 1000 m – 1:48.6 (1960)
- 1500 m – 2:44.0 (1960)
- 3000 m – 5:48.3 (1960)
