= Shuji Kobayashi =

Japanese speed skater (born 1939)

Personal information
- Nationality: Japanese
- Born: 17 April 1939 (age 86); Nagano, Japan

Sport
- Sport: Speed skating

Shuji Kobayashi (born 17 April 1939) is a Japanese speed skater. He competed in three events at the 1960 Winter Olympics.
