= Renato De Riva =

Italian speed skater

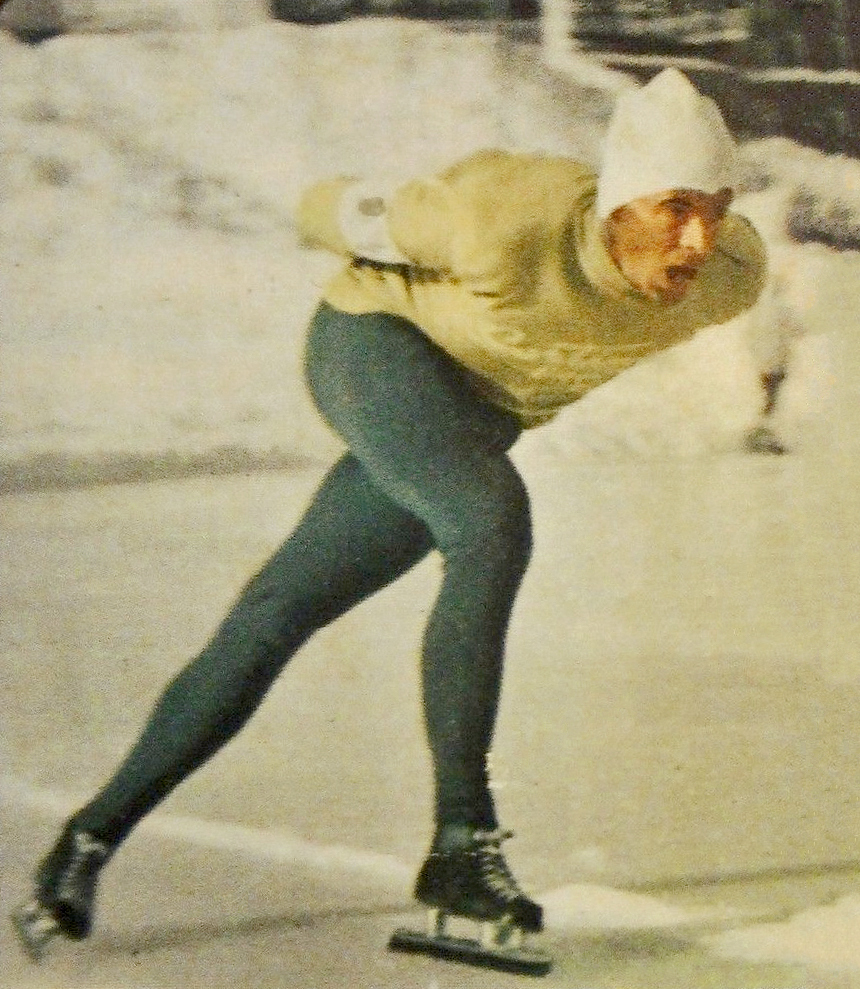

Personal information
- Born: 7 May 1937 Cortina d'Ampezzo, Italy
- Died: 10 May 1983 (aged 46) Cortina d'Ampezzo, Italy
- Height: 1.78 m (5 ft 10 in)
- Weight: 73 kg (161 lb)

Sport
- Sport: Speed skating
- Event: 500–10,000 m
- Club: SG Cortina Rex

Achievements and titles
- Personal best(s): 500 m – 42.2 (1968); 1000 m – 1:25.8 (1968); 1500 m – 2:08.2 (1968); 5000 m – 7:46.0 (1968); 10000 m – 16:05.4 (1965)

Renato De Riva (7 May 1937 – 10 May 1983) was an Italian speed skater who was active internationally between 1958 and 1968. He competed at the 1960, 1964, and 1968 Winter Olympics with the best result of 14th place in the 10,000 m in 1960 and in the 5000 m in 1964.
