= Natascha Liebknecht =

German speed skater

Personal information
- Nationality: German
- Born: 16 January 1941 (age 84); Pushkino, Russia

Sport
- Sport: Speed skating

Natascha Liebknecht (born 16 January 1941) is a German speed skater. She competed in two events at the 1960 Winter Olympics.
