= Jan Pesman =

Dutch speed skater

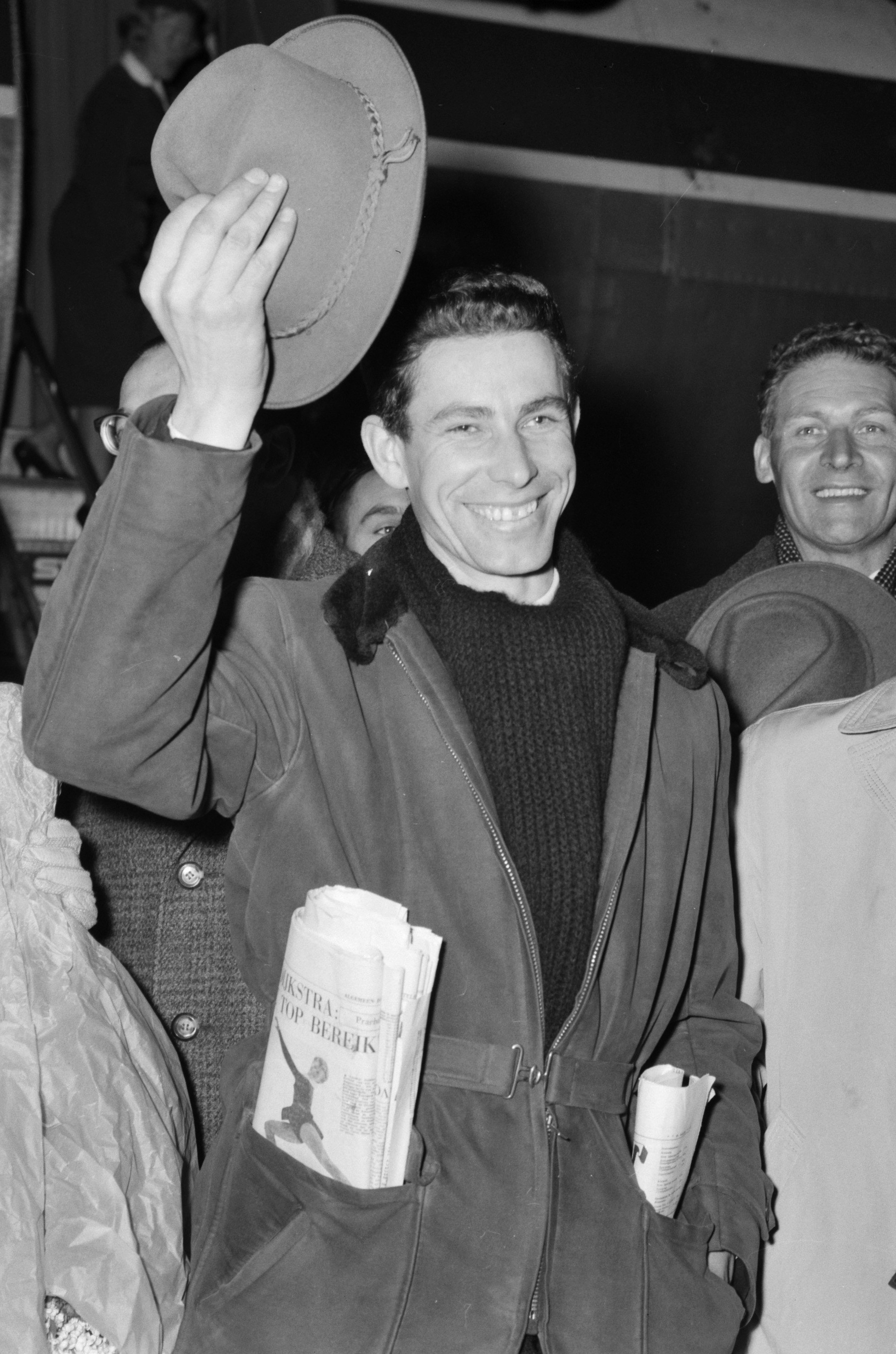
- Pesman in 1960

Personal information
- Born: 4 May 1931 Stedum, Netherlands
- Died: 23 January 2014 (aged 82) Delfzijl, Netherlands

Sport
- Country: Netherlands
- Sport: Speed skating

Achievements and titles
- Personal best(s): 500 m – 43.4 (1960); 1500 m – 2:11.0 (1960); 5000 m – 7:46.7 (1960); 10,000 m – 16:41.0 (1960)
Medal record
Representing Netherlands
Olympic Games
Bronze medal – third place	1960 Squaw Valley	5000 m

Jan Sijbrand Pesman (4 May 1931 – 23 January 2014) was a Dutch speed skater who specialized in long distances. He competed at the 1960 Winter Olympics in the 500 m, 5000 m and 10,000 m events and won a bronze medal in the 5000 m.

Pesman started competing in speed skating in his twenties, and took part in all major international events between 1957 and 1960. In 1959, he won the 5000 m event at the World Allround Speed Skating Championships and finished second in the 10,000 m; he won this event at the 1960 World Championships. He retired after the 1960 season.
