= Antonio Nitto =

Italian speed skater (1938–2023)

Personal information
- Nationality: Italian
- Born: 2 December 1938 Rome, Italy
- Died: 2 August 2023 (aged 84) Milan, Italy

Sport
- Sport: Speed skating

Antonio Nitto (2 December 1938 – 2 August 2023) was an Italian speed skater. He competed in three events at the 1960 Winter Olympics.

Nitto died in Milan on 2 August 2023, at the age of 84.
