= Han Hye-ja =

South Korean speed skater

Personal information
- Nationality: South Korean
- Born: 10 May 1941 (age 83)

Sport
- Sport: Speed skating

Han Hye-ja (born 10 May 1941) is a South Korean speed skater. She competed in three events at the 1960 Winter Olympics.
