= Sigrid Behrenz =

German speed skater (born 1941)

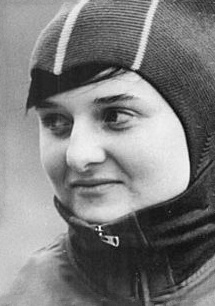
- Sigrid Behrenz in 1964

Personal information
- Born: 23 January 1941 (age 85) Prague, Protectorate Bohemia and Moravia
- Height: 1.64 m (5 ft 5 in)
- Weight: 66 kg (146 lb)

Sport
- Country: Germany
- Sport: Speed skating
- Club: SC Einheit Berlin; Berliner TSC

Sigrid Behrenz (also Sigrit; born 23 January 1941) is a retired German speed skater. She competed at the 1960 Winter Olympics and finished in 18th place in the 500 m and 1000 m events. At the 1960 Winter Olympics she was 25th in 500 m.

Personal bests:

- 500 m – 50.2 (1960)
- 1000 m – 1:43.8 (1960)
- 1500 m – 2:45.8 (1960)
- 3000 m – 5:50.3 (1964)
