= Mario Gios =

Italian speed skater

Personal information
- Nationality: Italian
- Born: 7 May 1936 (age 90) Asiago, Italy

Sport
- Sport: Speed skating

Mario Gios (born 7 May 1936) is an Italian speed skater. He competed in four events at the 1960 Winter Olympics.
