= Kim Gyeong-hoe =

South Korean speed skater

Personal information
- Nationality: South Korean
- Born: 22 January 1941 (age 84)

Sport
- Sport: Speed skating

Kim Gyeong-hoe (born 22 January 1941) is a South Korean speed skater. She competed in four events at the 1960 Winter Olympics.
