= Takeo Mizoo =

Japanese speed skater (born 1937)

Personal information
- Nationality: Japanese
- Born: 11 March 1937 (age 88); Hokkaido, Japan

Sport
- Sport: Speed skating

Takeo Mizoo (born 11 March 1937) is a Japanese speed skater. He competed in four events at the 1960 Winter Olympics.
