= Fumie Hama =

Japanese speed skater (born 1939)

Personal information
- Nationality: Japanese
- Born: 29 November 1939 (age 86) Okaya, Nagano, Japan

Sport
- Sport: Speed skating

Fumie Hama (浜 文恵, Hama Fumie; born 29 November 1939) is a Japanese speed skater. She competed in three events at the 1960 Winter Olympics.
