= Yoshiko Takano =

Japanese speed skater (born 1942)

Personal information
- Nationality: Japanese
- Born: 26 January 1942 (age 83); Koumi, Nagano, Japan

Sport
- Sport: Speed skating

Yoshiko Takano (鷹野 淑子, Takano Yoshiko, born 26 January 1942) is a Japanese speed skater. She competed in four events at the 1960 Winter Olympics.
