= Kjell Bäckman =

Swedish speed skater (1934–2019)

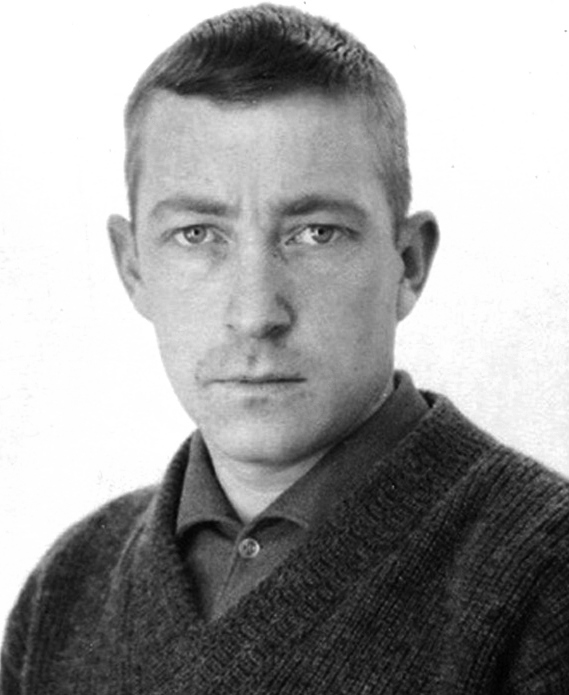

Personal information
- Full name: Kjell Hilding Bäckman
- Born: 21 February 1934 Gothenburg, Sweden
- Died: 9 January 2019 (aged 84)

Sport
- Sport: Speed skating
- Club: IK Wega, Göteborg
- Coached by: Hjalmar Andersen

Achievements and titles
- Personal best(s): 500 m – 44.3 (1963); 1500 m – 2:15.4 (1964); 5000 m – 7:52.0 (1964); 10000 m – 16:10.5 (1964)
Medal record
Representing Sweden
Olympic Games
Bronze medal – third place	1960 Squaw Valley	10000 m

Kjell Hilding "Tjalle" Bäckman (21 February 1934 – 9 January 2019) was a Swedish speed skater. He competed at the 1960 Winter Olympics in the 5000 m and 10000 m events and won a bronze medal in the 10000 m; all three medalists in that event broke the previous world record. Nationally, he won four long-distance titles: in the 5000 m (1959, 1961) and 10000 m (1959, 1960).
