= Squaw Valley Olympic Skating Rink =

Ice skating rink constructed for the 1960 Winter Olympics

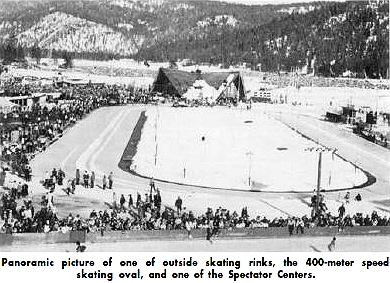
- Squaw Valley Speed Skating Venue 1960
- Interactive map of Squaw Valley Olympic Skating Rink
- Location: Squaw Valley, California, USA
- Type: ice rink

The Squaw Valley Olympic Skating Rink was a temporary venue constructed for the 1960 Winter Olympics in Olympic Valley, California (which was known at that time as "Squaw Valley"). Located outdoors near the Blyth Arena, it hosted the speed skating and some of the ice hockey events for those games. The site has been re-developed as parking and mixed residential-retail complex.
