= United States at the 1960 Winter Olympics =

- Flag of the United States with 49 stars. This was the only Olympics where this design was used. Although both Alaska and Hawaii gained statehood in 1959, the 49-star flag was used from July 4, 1959 to July 3, 1960.
- IOC code: USA
- NOC: United States Olympic Committee

in Squaw Valley
- Competitors: 79 (61 men, 18 women) in 4 sports
- Flag bearer: Don McDermott
- Medals Ranked 3rd: Gold 3 Silver 4 Bronze 3 Total 10

Winter Olympics appearances (overview)
- 1924; 1928; 1932; 1936; 1948; 1952; 1956; 1960; 1964; 1968; 1972; 1976; 1980; 1984; 1988; 1992; 1994; 1998; 2002; 2006; 2010; 2014; 2018; 2022; 2026

The United States was the host nation for the 1960 Winter Olympics in Squaw Valley, California. It was the only Olympics in which the athletes marched under the 49-star flag.

== Medalists ==
The following U.S. competitors won medals at the games. In the by discipline sections below, medalists' names are bolded.

Medal	Name	Sport	Event	Date
Gold	Carol Heiss	Figure skating	Women's singles	February 23
Gold	David Jenkins	Figure skating	Men's singles	February 26
Gold	United States men's national ice hockey team: Bill Christian; Roger Christian; Bill Cleary; Bob Cleary; Eugene Grazia; Paul Johnson; Jack Kirrane; John Mayasich; Jack McCartan; Robert McVey; Richard Meredith; Weldon Olson; Edwyn Owen; Rodney Paavola; Lawrence Palmer; Richard Rodenheiser; Tom Williams	Ice hockey	Men's tournament	February 28
Silver	Penny Pitou	Alpine skiing	Women's downhill	February 20
Silver	Penny Pitou	Alpine skiing	Women's giant slalom	February 23
Silver	Bill Disney	Speed skating	Men's 500 meters	February 24
Silver	Betsy Snite	Alpine skiing	Women's slalom	February 26
Bronze	Nancy Ludington; Ronald Ludington	Figure skating	Pairs	February 19
Bronze	Jeanne Ashworth	Speed skating	Women's 500 meters	February 20
Bronze	Barbara Roles	Figure skating	Women's singles	February 23

Medals by sport
Sport	1st place, gold medalist(s)	2nd place, silver medalist(s)	3rd place, bronze medalist(s)	Total
Figure skating	2	0	2	**4**
Ice hockey	1	0	0	**1**
Alpine skiing	0	3	0	**3**
Speed skating	0	1	1	**2**
Total	3	4	3	10

Medals by gender
Gender	1st place, gold medalist(s)	2nd place, silver medalist(s)	3rd place, bronze medalist(s)	Total	Percentage
Female	1	3	2	**6**	60.0%
Male	2	1	0	**3**	30.0%
Mixed	0	0	1	**1**	10.0%
Total	3	4	3	10	100%

Multiple medalists
Name	Sport	1st place, gold medalist(s)	2nd place, silver medalist(s)	3rd place, bronze medalist(s)	Total
Penny Pitou	Alpine skiing	0	2	0	**2**

== Alpine skiing ==
Men

Athlete	Event	Run 1		Run 2		Total	
Athlete	Event	Time	Rank	Time	Rank	Time	Rank
Gordi Eaton	Downhill	—N/a				2:14.0	17
Dave Gorsuch	Downhill	—N/a				2:11.0	14
Max Marolt	Downhill	—N/a				2:14.2	18
Marvin Melville	Downhill	—N/a				2:15.9	22
Jim Barrier	Giant slalom	—N/a				1:52.7	16
Tom Corcoran	Giant slalom	—N/a				1:49.7	4
Dave Gorsuch	Giant slalom	—N/a				1:52.3	14
Max Marolt	Giant slalom	—N/a				1:54.9	21
Jim Barrier	Slalom	DNF					
Frank Brown	Slalom	1:58.2	52	1:03.1	12	3:01.3	37
Tom Corcoran	Slalom	1:12.5	13	1:02.2	9	2:14.7	9
Chuck Ferries	Slalom	1:16.1	16	DSQ			

Women

Athlete	Event	Run 1		Run 2		Total	
Athlete	Event	Time	Rank	Time	Rank	Time	Rank
Joan Hannah	Downhill	—N/a				1:47.9	21
Linda Meyers	Downhill	—N/a				1:53.4	33
Penny Pitou	Downhill	—N/a				1:38.6	2nd place, silver medalist(s)
Betsy Snite	Downhill	—N/a				DSQ	
Beverley Anderson	Giant slalom	—N/a				1:57.4	36
Linda Meyers	Giant slalom	—N/a				DSQ	
Penny Pitou	Giant slalom	—N/a				1:40.0	2nd place, silver medalist(s)
Betsy Snite	Giant slalom	—N/a				1:40.4	4
Beverley Anderson	Slalom	1:13.1	38	1:00.0	14	2:13.1	26
Renie Cox	Slalom	59.4	18	59.8	10	1:59.2	9
Penny Pitou	Slalom	58.5	9	1:21.3	34	2:19.8	33
Betsy Snite	Slalom	57.4	4	55.5	1	1:52.9	2nd place, silver medalist(s)

== Biathlon ==
Athlete	Event	Time	Misses	Rank
John Burritt	Individual	1:46:36.8	5 (0+1+3+1)	14
Larry Damon	Individual	1:59:38.2	13 (5+3+3+2)	24
Gustav Hanson	Individual	1:58:06.2	9 (3+3+2+1)	23
Dick Mize	Individual	1:55:56.2	11 (3+3+5+0)	21

== Cross-country skiing ==
Athlete	Event	Time	Rank
Charlie Akers	Men's 15 km	1:02:35.7	50
Olavi Hirvonen	Men's 15 km	1:00:38.6	48
Peter Lahdenpera	Men's 15 km	59:13.0	46
Mack Miller	Men's 15 km	54:49.0	22
Sven Johanson	Men's 30 km	DNF	
Leo Massa	Men's 30 km	2:16:47.0	42
Mack Miller	Men's 30 km	2:03:05.4	27
Joe Pete Wilson	Men's 30 km	2:22:16.2	43
Theodore Farwell	Men's 50 km	3:49:56.6	31
Leo Massa	Men's 50 km	3:41:08.2	29
Olavi Hirvonen	Men's 50 km	3:36:37.8	26
Mack Miller	Men's 50 km	3:17:23.2	17
Karl Bohlin; John Dendahl; Peter Lahdenpera; Mack Miller	Men's 4 × 10 km relay	2:38:01.8	11

== Figure skating ==
On February 15, 1961, the entire United States figure skating team and several family members, coaches, and officials were killed when Sabena Flight 548 crashed in Brussels, Belgium, en route to the World Championships in Prague. The accident caused the cancellation of the 1961 World Championships and necessitated the building of a new American skating program.

Individual

Athlete	Event	CF	FS	Total		
Athlete	Event	Rank	Rank	Points	Places	Rank
Robert Brewer	Men's singles	7	8	1320.3	66	7
Tim Brown	Men's singles	5	4	1374.1	43	5
David Jenkins	Men's singles	2	1	1440.2	10	1st place, gold medalist(s)
Carol Heiss	Ladies' singles	1	1	1490.1	9	1st place, gold medalist(s)
Laurence Owen	Ladies' singles	6	6	1343.0	57	6
Barbara Roles	Ladies' singles	3	2	1414.9	26	3rd place, bronze medalist(s)

Mixed

Athlete	Event	Points	Places	Rank
Ila Ray Hadley; Ray Hadley, Jr.	Pairs	65.7	78	11
Nancy Ludington; Ronald Ludington	Pairs	76.2	27.5	3rd place, bronze medalist(s)
Maribel Owen; Dudley Richards	Pairs	67.5	69	10

== Ice hockey ==
Summary

Team	Event	First round			Consolation round		Medal round					
Team	Event	Opposition Score	Opposition Score	Rank	Opposition Score	Opposition Score	Opposition Score	Opposition Score	Opposition Score	Opposition Score	Opposition Score	Rank
United States men	Men's tournament	Czechoslovakia; W 7–5	Australia; W 12–1	1 Q	Bye		Sweden; W 6–3	Germany; W 9–1	Canada; W 2–1	Soviet Union; W 3–2	Czechoslovakia; W 9–4	1st place, gold medalist(s)

Roster

Bill Christian
Roger Christian
Bill Cleary
Bob Cleary
Eugene Grazia
Paul Johnson
Jack Kirrane
John Mayasich
Jack McCartan
Robert McVey
Richard Meredith
Weldon Olson
Edwyn Owen
Rodney Paavola
Lawrence Palmer
Richard Rodenheiser
Tom Williams

First round
Top two teams (shaded ones) from each group advanced to the final round and played for 1st-6th places, other teams played in the consolation round.

Rank	Team	Pld	W	L	T	GF	GA	Pts
1	United States	2	2	0	0	19	6	4
2	Czechoslovakia	2	1	1	0	23	8	2
3	Australia	2	0	2	0	2	30	0

- USA 7-5 Czechoslovakia
- USA 12-1 Australia

Medal round
First place team wins gold, second silver and third bronze.

Rank	Team	Pld	W	L	T	GF	GA	Pts
1	United States	5	5	0	0	29	11	10
2	Canada	5	4	1	0	31	12	8
3	Soviet Union	5	2	2	1	24	19	5
4	Czechoslovakia	5	2	3	0	21	23	4
5	Sweden	5	1	3	1	19	19	3
6	Germany	5	0	5	0	5	45	0

- USA 6-3 Sweden
- USA 9-1 Germany (UTG)
- USA 2-1 Canada
- USA 3-2 USSR
- USA 9-4 Czechoslovakia

== Nordic combined ==
Athlete	Event	Ski Jumping				Cross-country			Total	
Athlete	Event	Jump 1	Jump 2	Points	Rank	Time	Points	Rank	Points	Rank
John Cress	Individual	92.0	99.5	191.5	27	1:12:59.7	183.806	31	375.919	30
Theodore Farwell	Individual	86.5	86.0	172.5	30	1:05:09.4	214.194	21	386.694	27
Craig Lussi	Individual	83.5	75.0	158.5	31	1:07:55.7	203.419	28	361.919	30
Alfred Vincelette	Individual	99.0	91.5	190.5	28	1:07:35.4	204.774	26	395.274	26

== Ski jumping ==
Athlete	Event	Jump 1			Jump 2			Total	
Athlete	Event	Distance	Points	Rank	Distance	Points	Rank	Points	Rank
Gene Kotlarek	Normal hill	84.0	96.5	27	77.0 fall	68.6	44	165.1	42
Ansten Samuelstuen	Normal hill	90.0	107.8	5	79.0	103.7	13	211.5	7
Jon St. Andre	Normal hill	81.5	92.5	34	78.5	99.8	25	192.3	28
Butch Wedin	Normal hill	79.0	93.5	32	72.0	93.6	36	187.1	32

== Speed skating ==
Men

Athlete	Event	Time	Rank
Bill Carow	500 m	DNF	
Bill Disney	500 m	40.3	2nd place, silver medalist(s)
Terry McDermott	500 m	40.9	7
Eddie Rudolph	500 m	41.2	10
Floyd Bedbury	1500 m	2:18.9	22
Dick Hunt	1500 m	2:17.7	17
Keith Meyer	1500 m	2:21.7	29
Eddie Rudolph	1500 m	2:23.1	35
Floyd Bedbury	5000 m	8:39.6	30
Dick Hunt	5000 m	8:21.3	17
Arnold Uhrlass	5000 m	8:18.0	14
Arnold Uhrlass	10,000 m	16:49.3	15
Ross Zucco	10,000 m	16:37.6	10

Women

Athlete	Event	Time	Rank
Jeanne Ashworth	500 m	46.1	3rd place, bronze medalist(s)
Kathy Mulholland	500 m	47.9	10
Jeanne Omelenchuk	500 m	49.3	16
Jeanne Ashworth	1000 m	1:36.5	8
Jeanne Omelenchuk	1000 m	1:39.8	15
Jeanne Ashworth	1500 m	2:33.7	11
Barb Lockhart	1500 m	2:37.0	18
Jeanne Omelenchuk	1500 m	2:36.4	15
Jeanne Ashworth	3000 m	5:28.5	8
Beverly Buhr	3000 m	6:03.1	19
Cornelia Harrington	3000 m	5:57.5	18
