= Ski jumping at the 1960 Winter Olympics =

Ski jumping at the VIII Olympic Winter Games
- Venue: Papoose Peak Jumps
- Dates: 28 February 1960
- Competitors: 45 from 15 nations
- Winning Score: 227.2

Medalists
1st place, gold medalist(s)		Helmut Recknagel	United Team of Germany
2nd place, silver medalist(s)		Niilo Halonen	Finland
3rd place, bronze medalist(s)		Otto Leodolter	Austria

Ski jumping at the 1960 Winter Olympics consisted of one event held on 28 February, taking place at Papoose Peak Jumps.

The competition scheduled two jumps per entrant. Standings were determined by a point system under the parameters of combined distance points and "style" points awarded for each attempt, judged by a panel of 5 officials. This event marked the first time the Däscher Technique was used in ski jumping competitions.

== Medal summary ==
=== Medal table ===
Rank	Nation	Gold	Silver	Bronze	Total
1	United Team of Germany	1	0	0	1
2	Finland	0	1	0	1
3	Austria	0	0	1	1
Totals (3 entries)		1	1	1	3

=== Events ===
Event	Gold		Silver		Bronze	
Individual	Helmut Recknagel; United Team of Germany	227.2	Niilo Halonen; Finland	222.6	Otto Leodolter; Austria	219.4

== Results ==
Rank	Athlete	Country	Jump 1	Jump 2	Total
1st place, gold medalist(s)	Helmut Recknagel	United Team of Germany	113.6	113.6	227.2
2nd place, silver medalist(s)	Niilo Halonen	Finland	111.3	111.3	222.6
3rd place, bronze medalist(s)	Otto Leodolter	Austria	107.6	111.8	219.4
4	Nikolay Kamenskiy	Soviet Union	110.2	106.7	216.9
5	Torbjørn Yggeseth	Norway	106.6	109.5	216.1
6	Max Bolkart	United Team of Germany	104.3	108.3	212.6
7	Ansten Samuelstuen	United States	107.8	103.7	211.5
8	Juhani Kärkinen	Finland	108.3	103.1	211.4
9	K'oba Ts'akadze	Soviet Union	107.0	104.1	211.1
10	Nikolai Schamov	Soviet Union	103.2	107.4	210.6
11	Halvor Næs	Norway	103.1	106.7	209.8
12	Veit Kührt	United Team of Germany	106.1	102.6	208.7
13	Kåre Berg	Norway	100.7	106.7	207.4
14	Alwin Plank	Austria	105.3	101.4	206.7
15	Sadao Kikuchi	Japan	104.1	102.1	206.2
16	Walter Steinegger	Austria	103.3	102.6	205.9
17	Eino Kirjonen	Finland	104.2	101.6	205.8
18	Rolf Strandberg	Sweden	100.0	104.8	204.8
19	Bengt Eriksson	Sweden	99.6	102.4	202.0
20	Andreas Däscher	Switzerland	101.1	100.1	201.2
21	Werner Lesser	United Team of Germany	98.0	102.8	200.8
22	Koichi Sato	Japan	98.4	101.9	200.3
23	Ole Tom Nord	Norway	94.6	105.6	200.2
24	Dino De Zordo	Italy	99.7	99.1	198.8
25	Yosuke Eto	Japan	102.2	95.5	197.7
26	Claude Jean-Prost	France	99.9	96.9	196.8
27	Leonid Fyodorov	Soviet Union	97.2	95.9	193.1
28	Jon St. Andre	United States	92.5	99.8	192.3
29	Inge Lindqvist	Sweden	90.4	99.7	190.1
30	Takashi Matsui	Japan	92.6	97.0	189.6
31	Władysław Tajner	Poland	87.6	100.6	188.2
32	Butch Wedin	United States	93.5	93.6	187.1
33	Jacques Charland	Canada	91.0	95.3	186.3
34	Gerry Gravelle	Canada	94.4	91.0	185.4
35	Willi Egger	Austria	88.1	97.3	185.4
36	Nilo Zandanel	Italy	95.0	89.8	184.8
37	Enzo Perin	Italy	84.8	96.8	181.6
38	Robert Rey	France	87.7	91.6	179.3
39	Luigi Pennacchio	Italy	78.7	92.5	171.2
40	Veikko Kankkonen	Finland	72.0	96.0	168.0
41	Tamás Sudár	Hungary	84.1	81.7	165.8
42	Gene Kotlarek	United States	96.5	68.6	165.1
43	Skarphéðinn Guðmundsson	Iceland	73.0	82.7	155.7
44	Alois Moser	Canada	71.4	79.7	151.1
45	Kjell Sjöberg	Sweden	94.1	33.8	127.9

== Participating NOCs ==
Fifteen nations participated in ski jumping at the Squaw Valley Games.

- Austria (4)
- Canada (3)
- Finland (4)
- France (2)
- United Team of Germany (4)
- Hungary (1)
- Iceland (1)
- Italy (4)
- Japan (4)
- Norway (4)
- Poland (1)
- Soviet Union (4)
- Sweden (4)
- Switzerland (1)
- United States (4)
