= Planica 1960 =

Coordinates: 46°28′43″N 13°43′16″E

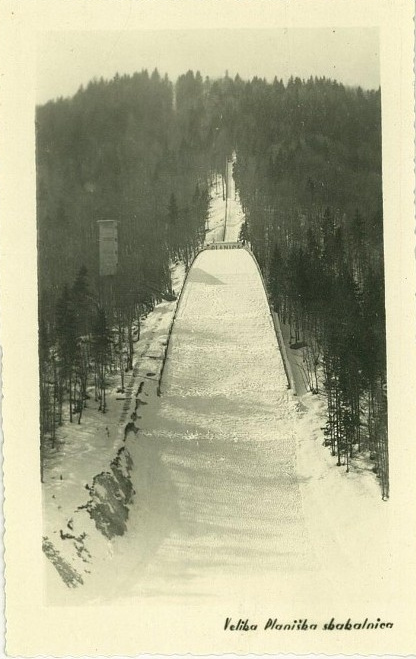
- Host city: Planica, FPR Yugoslavia
- Sport: Ski flying
- Events: International Ski Flying Week
- Main venue: Bloudkova velikanka K120

Planica 1960 was international ski flying week competition, held from 26 to 27 March 1960 in Planica, PR Slovenia, FPR Yugoslavia. A total crowd of 63,000 spectators gathered over four days.

This was the first ever TV international live broadcast transmission from Slovenia for European Broadcasting Union (EBU) and produced by RTV Ljubljana.

== Schedule ==
Date	Event	Rounds	Longest jump of the day	Visitors
24 March 1960	Qualification event K80	3	81 metres (266 ft) by Helmut Recknagel	3,000
25 March 1960	Training K120	3	124.5 metres (408 ft) by Helmut Recknagel	15,000
26 March 1960	International event: day 1	2	118.5 metres (389 ft) by Helmut Recknagel	15,000
27 March 1960	International event: day 2	4	127 metres (417 ft) by Helmut Recknagel	30,000

== Competitions ==
On 24 March 1960, first training on Srednja Bloudkova K80 normal hill was on schedule in front of 3,000 people, which also counted as qualification for main international event on large hill. There were 42 competitors from twelve countries performing in trial and two rounds for points. Helmut Recknagel won this independent (qualification) event for the main competition with 227.5 points.

On 25 March 1960, first training day on Bloudkova velikanka K120 large hill was on schedule in front of 15,000 people. With total three rounds, two of them were rated with points if one of two official competition days would be canceled. Helmut Recknagel was highest rated with new hill record at 124 metres.

On 26 March 1960, first day of competition on Bloudkova velikanka K120 large hill was on schedule in front of 15,000 people with only two rounds due to strong winds, only one jump counting into final result. Helmut Recknagel was leading after first day of competition with longest jump of the day at 118.5 metres.

On 27 March 1960, second and final day of competition on Bloudkova velikanka K120 large hill was on schedule in front of 30,000 people, with total four rounds and three counting into final result. Helmut Recknagel won the two day competition (1 best from Saturday and 3 best jumps from Sunday) for the second time in a row, with hill record at 127 metres.

=== Training 1 (Qualifications) ===
24 March 1960 – Srednja Bloudkova K80 – Three rounds (trial + 2 counting)

Bib	Name	Country	Round 1	Round 2	Points
1	Helmut Recknagel	East Germany	81 m	77 m	227.5
2	Gene Kotlarek	United States	73.5 m	74.5 m	212.5
3	Torbjørn Yggeseth	Norway	70.5 m	73.5 m	212.0
4	Marjan Pečar	Yugoslavia	74 m	72.5 m	209.0
5	Werner Lesser	East Germany	73.5 m	72.5 m	208.5
	Raimo Vitikainen	Finland	74 m	72 m	208.5
7	Ansten Samuelstuen	United States	72.5 m	71.5 m	205.0
8	Władysław Tajner	Poland	73 m	73 m	204.0
9	Willi Egger	Austria	73.5 m	70.5 m	203.5
10	Hermann Anwander	West Germany	71.5 m	71.5 m	203.0
11	Timo Kivela	Finland	73.5 m	71 m	202.0
	Othmar Heyer	East Germany	72 m	73.5 m	202.0
	Helmut Wegscheider	West Germany	70 m	72.5 m	202.0
14	Max Bolkart	West Germany	69 m	61.5 m	201.0
15	Gustav Bujok	Poland	72 m	72 m	200.0
16	Kurt Schram	East Germany	69 m	73 m	197.0
17	Arne Larsen	Norway	70 m	68 m	196.5
18	Miro Oman	Yugoslavia	73 m	67.5 m	196.5
19	Antoni Łaciak	Poland	70.5 m	70.5 m	194.5
20	Svein Bergersen	Norway	67.5 m	70 m	193.5
21	Willi Wirth	East Germany	71.5 m	67 m	192.0
22	Lothar Glass	East Germany	69.5 m	69 m	191.5
23	Robert Rey	France	70 m	70 m	190.0
24	Harry Bergquist	Sweden	66 m	66 m	189.5
25	Alois Leodolter	Austria	66 m	68 m	189.0
26	Jože Zidar	Yugoslavia	66.5 m	67 m	187.0
27	Nilo Zandanel	Italy	69 m	67 m	185.0
28	Dino De Zordo	Italy	65 m	66 m	184.5
29	Milan Rojina	Yugoslavia	67.5 m	65 m	184.5
30	Peter Eržen	Yugoslavia	68 m	67 m	184.5
31	Günter Oettel	East Germany	67 m	65 m	184.5
32	Jože Langus	Yugoslavia	66 m	65 m	184.0
33	Mato Krznarič	Yugoslavia	64.5 m	64.5 m	181.0
34	Bert Andersson	Sweden	68 m	62.5 m	178.0
35	Engelbert Kröll	Austria	66.5 m	66.5 m	176.5
36	Bine Rogelj	Yugoslavia	62 m	63.5 m	175.0
37	Lojze Gorjanc	Yugoslavia	62 m	65.5 m	175.0
38	Ueli Scheidegger	Switzerland	62.5 m	63 m	173.5
39	Peter Wenger	Switzerland	64 m	63.5 m	170.0
40	Werner Brügger	Switzerland	67 m	66 m	147.5
41	Jože Šlibar	Yugoslavia	74.5 m	68.5 m	140.0

=== Training 2 ===
25 March 1960 – Bloudkova velikanka K120 – Three round (Trial + 2 counting)

Bib	Name	Country	Round 1	Round 2	Points
1	Helmut Recknagel	East Germany	110 m	124.5 m	229.6
2	Marjan Pečar	Yugoslavia	110 m	115 m	212.9
3	Raimo Vitikainen	Finland	109 m	111 m	209.4
4	Kurt Schram	East Germany	109 m	112 m	204.2
5	Arne Larsen	Norway	107 m	108.5 m	203.2
6	Gene Kotlarek	United States	102 m	108.5 m	199.3
7	Max Bolkart	West Germany	94 m	102 m	198.2
8	Willi Egger	Austria	104.5 m	108 m	197.4
9	Jože Šlibar	Yugoslavia	101 m	109 m	194.4
10	Nilo Zandanel	Italy	105 m	109 m	193.6
11	Torbjørn Yggeseth	Norway	91 m	99 m	192.6
12	Władysław Tajner	Poland	91 m	101.5 m	191.1
13	Timo Kivela	Finland	102 m	104.5 m	190.6
14	Peter Müller	Austria	101 m	103.5 m	189.5
15	Othmar Heyer	East Germany	101.5 m	108.5 m	188.9
16	Robert Rey	France	92 m	101 m	187.6
17	Werner Lesser	East Germany	101 m	105 m	187.6
18	Inge Lindqvist	Sweden	97 m	108 m	N/A
19	Gustav Bujok	Poland	100 m	102 m	181.0
20	Helmut Wegscheider	West Germany	97 m	101 m	180.8
21	Lothar Glass	East Germany	99.5 m	100 m	177.5
22	Antoni Łaciak	Poland	97 m	100.5 m	175.4
23	Miro Oman	Yugoslavia	93 m	97 m	174.1
24	Svein Bergersen	Norway	93 m	101 m	173.6
25	Ansten Samuelstuen	United States	87 m	96.5 m	172.7
26	Bert Andersson	Sweden	90 m	100 m	171.4
27	Alois Leodolter	Austria	84 m	90 m	169.6
28	Dino De Zordo	Italy	81 m	91 m	167.0
29	Günter Oettel	East Germany	93 m	94 m	166.0
30	Harry Bergquist	Sweden	82 m	93 m	163.5
31	Jože Langus	Yugoslavia	87 m	94 m	163.2
32	Jože Zidar	Yugoslavia	81 m	96 m	160.0
33	Hermann Anwander	West Germany	96 m	104.5 m	159.8
34	Werner Brügger	Switzerland	86.5 m	93 m	154.0
35	Willi Wirth	East Germany	77 m	86 m	152.8
36	Peter Eržen	Yugoslavia	75.5 m	85.5 m	152.3
37	Engelbert Kröll	Austria	81 m	84 m	148.8
38	Milan Rojina	Yugoslavia	75 m	82 m	148.0
39	Bine Rogelj	Yugoslavia	82.5 m	90 m	147.9
40	Mato Krznarič	Yugoslavia	72 m	81 m	147.8
41	Peter Wenger	Switzerland	N/A	N/A	142.9
42	Lojze Gorjanc	Yugoslavia	N/A	N/A	142.0

=== International Ski Flying Week: Day 1 ===
26 March 1960 – Bloudkova velikanka K120 – Two rounds (1 best counting)

Rank	Name	Country	Round 1	Round 2	Points
1	Helmut Recknagel	East Germany	103 m	118.5 m	228.1
2	Arne Larsen	Norway	92 m	108.5 m	205.7
3	Raimo Vitikainen	Finland	89.5 m	109 m	204.7
4	Kurt Schram	East Germany	93 m	110.5 m	N/A
5	Gene Kotlarek	United States	89 m	102 m	196.2
6	Torbjørn Yggeseth	Norway	90 m	99 m	195.6
7	Nilo Zandanel	Italy	91.5 m	104 m	195.3
8	Władysław Tajner	Poland	88.5 m	104 m	194.9
9	Inge Lindqvist	Sweden	82 m	112 m	191.8
10	Svein Bergersen	Norway	84 m	101 m	188.4
11	Max Bolkart	West Germany	89 m	94 m	187.3
12	Werner Lesser	East Germany	82 m	101.5 m	187.2
13	Marjan Pečar	Yugoslavia	89 m	100 m	186.6
14	Timo Kivela	Finland	86 m	98 m	184.9
15	Bert Andersson	Sweden	81 m	103 m	184.2
16	Gustav Bujok	Poland	86 m	99 m	183.9
17	Günter Oettel	East Germany	86 m	101 m	183.4
18	Robert Rey	France	80 m	101 m	179.7
19	Peter Müller	Austria	85 m	93 m	178.8
20	Lothar Glass	East Germany	84.5 m	100 m	177.5
21	Helmut Wegscheider	West Germany	81 m	98 m	175.1
22	Willi Wirth	East Germany	81 m	96.5 m	174.4
23	Alois Leodolter	Austria	80 m	93.5 m	173.7
24	Ansten Samuelstuen	United States	79 m	88 m	170.5
25	Antoni Łaciak	Poland	79 m	92 m	168.7
26	Dino De Zordo	Italy	81 m	89 m	167.9
27	Peter Wenger	Switzerland	74 m	91.5 m	161.3
28	Ueli Scheidegger	Switzerland	75 m	93 m	160.8
29	Engelbert Kröll	Austria	74 m	92 m	160.2
30	Milan Rojina	Yugoslavia	78 m	84 m	160.0
31	Othmar Heyer	East Germany	86 m	106.5 m	157.9
32	Harry Bergquist	Sweden	80.5 m	96 m	151.1
33	Hermann Anwander	West Germany	82 m	100.5 m	150.4
34	Bine Rogelj	Yugoslavia	69 m	79.5 m	141.7
35	Jože Šlibar	Yugoslavia	86.5 m	88 m	141.0
36	Werner Brügger	Switzerland	83 m	N/A	129.8
37	Peter Eržen	Yugoslavia	78 m	88 m	126.7
38	Lojze Gorjanc	Yugoslavia	74 m	85 m	120.6
39	Miro Oman	Yugoslavia	70 m	85 m	114.9
40	Mato Krznarič	Yugoslavia	68 m	83 m	114.2

Fall or touch!

=== International Ski Flying Week: Day 2 ===
27 March 1960 – Bloudkova velikanka K120 – Four rounds (3 best counting)

Rank	Name	Country	Round 1	Round 2	Round 3
N/A	Helmut Recknagel	East Germany	122 m	127 m	115 m
N/A	Arne Larsen	Norway	107.5 m	101 m	101 m
N/A	Raimo Vitikainen	Finland	105 m	92.5 m	108 m
N/A	Kurt Schram	East Germany	103 m	98 m	101 m
N/A	Gene Kotlarek	United States	104.5 m	93 m	102 m
N/A	Max Bolkart	West Germany	98.5 m	98.5 m	102 m
N/A	Inge Lindqvist	Sweden	100 m	92 m	101 m
N/A	Marjan Pečar	Yugoslavia	98 m	92 m	103 m
N/A	Nilo Zandanel	Italy	105 m	95 m	105 m
N/A	Werner Lesser	East Germany	95 m	98.5 m	95.5 m
N/A	Torbjørn Yggeseth	Norway	94 m	87 m	100 m
N/A	Hermann Anwander	West Germany	94 m	93 m	103 m
N/A	Władysław Tajner	Poland	97.5 m	91 m	98 m
N/A	Svein Bergersen	Norway	91 m	91 m	95.5 m
N/A	Peter Müller	Austria	93 m	94.5 m	92.5 m
N/A	Robert Rey	France	98 m	90 m	88 m
N/A	Timo Kivela	Finland	101 m	94.5 m	86 m
N/A	Gustav Bujok	Poland	87 m	95.5 m	93 m
N/A	Harry Bergquist	Sweden	101 m	92.5 m	87 m
N/A	Dino De Zordo	Italy	100 m	86 m	89 m
N/A	Bert Andersson	Sweden	N/A	N/A	N/A
N/A	Günter Oettel	East Germany	N/A	N/A	N/A
N/A	Helmut Wegscheider	West Germany	N/A	N/A	N/A
N/A	Willi Wirth	East Germany	N/A	N/A	N/A
N/A	Alois Leodolter	Austria	N/A	N/A	N/A
N/A	Ansten Samuelstuen	United States	N/A	N/A	N/A
N/A	Lothar Glass	East Germany	N/A	N/A	N/A
N/A	Antoni Łaciak	Poland	N/A	N/A	N/A
N/A	Jože Zidar	Yugoslavia	86 m	86.5 m	84 m
N/A	Jože Langus	Yugoslavia	86 m	80 m	84 m
N/A	Jože Šlibar	Yugoslavia	97.5 m	77 m	71 m
N/A	Miro Oman	Yugoslavia	86 m	82 m	87 m
N/A	Engelbert Kröll	Austria	N/A	N/A	N/A
N/A	Peter Eržen	Yugoslavia	85 m	80 m	79.5 m
N/A	Ueli Scheidegger	Switzerland	N/A	N/A	N/A
N/A	Peter Wenger	Switzerland	N/A	N/A	N/A
N/A	Lojze Gorjanc	Yugoslavia	84 m	78 m	80.5 m
N/A	Mato Krznarič	Yugoslavia	81 m	80.5 m	80.5 m
N/A	Milan Rojina	Yugoslavia	79.5 m	78 m	79 m
N/A	Bine Rogelj	Yugoslavia	78 m	82 m	81 m

== Official results ==
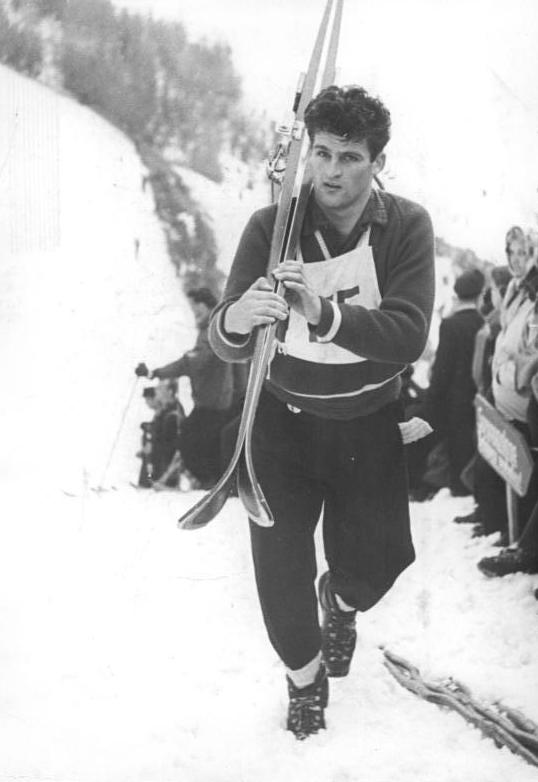
Helmut Recknagel won Planica second time in a row (after 1957), with another two new hill records at 124.5 and 127 metres

26–27 March 1960 – Bloudkova velikanka K120 – Four rounds (1 Saturday + 3 Sunday)

Rank	Name	Country	26/3/20	27 March			Total
1	Helmut Recknagel	East Germany	118.5 m	122 m	127 m	115 m	462.6
2	Arne Larsen	Norway	108.5 m	107.5 m	101 m	101 m	395.4
3	Raimo Vitikainen	Finland	109 m	105 m	92.5 m	108 m	394.6
4	Kurt Schram	East Germany	110.5 m	103 m	98 m	101 m	382.0
5	Gene Kotlarek	United States	89 m	104.5 m	93 m	102 m	380.7
6	Max Bolkart	West Germany	89 m	98.5 m	98.5 m	102 m	376.2
7	Inge Lindqvist	Sweden	112 m	100 m	92 m	101 m	375.2
8	Marjan Pečar	Yugoslavia	89 m	98 m	92 m	103 m	273.9
9	Nilo Zandanel	Italy	91.5 m	105 m	95 m	105 m	372.6
10	Werner Lesser	East Germany	101.5 m	95 m	98.5 m	95.5 m	365.4
11	Torbjørn Yggeseth	Norway	90 m	94 m	87 m	100 m	363.1
12	Hermann Anwander	West Germany	82 m	94 m	93 m	103 m	360.4
13	Władysław Tajner	Poland	104 m	97.5 m	91 m	98 m	356.2
14	Svein Bergersen	Norway	101 m	91 m	91 m	95.5 m	353.8
15	Peter Müller	Austria	93 m	93 m	94.5 m	92.5 m	350.4
16	Robert Rey	France	101 m	98 m	90 m	88 m	347.1
17	Timo Kivela	Finland	86 m	101 m	94.5 m	86 m	344.7
18	Gustav Bujok	Poland	86 m	87 m	95.5 m	93 m	344.0
19	Harry Bergquist	Sweden	80.5 m	101 m	92.5 m	87 m	341.7
20	Dino De Zordo	Italy	81 m	100 m	86 m	89 m	340.6
21	Bert Andersson	Sweden	N/A	N/A	N/A	N/A	337.4
22	Günter Oettel	East Germany	N/A	N/A	N/A	N/A	336.7
23	Helmut Wegscheider	West Germany	N/A	N/A	N/A	N/A	335.8
24	Willi Wirth	East Germany	N/A	N/A	N/A	N/A	331.1
25	Alois Leodolter	Austria	N/A	N/A	N/A	N/A	329.6
26	Ansten Samuelstuen	United States	N/A	N/A	N/A	N/A	327.7
27	Lothar Glass	East Germany	N/A	N/A	N/A	N/A	324.9
28	Antoni Łaciak	Poland	N/A	N/A	N/A	N/A	324.6
29	Jože Zidar	Yugoslavia	80 m	86 m	86.5 m	84 m	322.5
30	Jože Langus	Yugoslavia	78.5 m	86 m	80 m	84 m	312.2
31	Jože Šlibar	Yugoslavia	86.5 m	97.5 m	77 m	71 m	302.0
32	Miro Oman	Yugoslavia	85 m	86 m	82 m	87 m	301.0
33	Engelbert Kröll	Austria	N/A	N/A	N/A	N/A	299.7
34	Peter Eržen	Yugoslavia	78 m	85 m	80 m	79.5 m	297.9
35	Ueli Scheidegger	Switzerland	N/A	N/A	N/A	N/A	296.7
36	Peter Wenger	Switzerland	N/A	N/A	N/A	N/A	291.4
37	Lojze Gorjanc	Yugoslavia	71 m	84 m	78 m	80.5 m	290.0
38	Mato Krznarič	Yugoslavia	68 m	81 m	80.5 m	80.5 m	289.8
39	Milan Rojina	Yugoslavia	78 m	79.5 m	78 m	79 m	287.4
40	Bine Rogelj	Yugoslavia	69 m	78 m	82 m	81 m	286.3

== Team ==
Competition was held in memory of then recently late Stanko Bloudek (1890–1959), a Slovenian engineer and co-constructor of Bloudkova velikanka, as well as one of three main Planica pioneers. France, with one competitor, didn't compete.

=== Stanko Bloudek Memorial ===
Rank	Country	Points	Total
1	East Germany Helmut Recknagel; Kurt Schram	462.6; 382.0	844.6
2	Norway Arne Larsen; Torbjørn Yggeseth	395.4; 363.1	758.5
3	Finland Raimo Vitikainen; Timo Kivela	394.6; 344.7	739.3
4	West Germany Max Bolkart; Hermann Anwander	376.2; 360.4	736.6
5	Sweden Inge Lindqvist; Harry Bergquist	375.2; 341.7	716.9
6	Italy Nilo Zandanel; Dino De Zordo	372.6; 340.6	713.2
7	United States Gene Kotlarek; Ansten Samuellsten	380.7; 327.7	708.4
8	Poland Władysław Tajner; Gustav Bujok	356.2; 344.0	700.2
9	Yugoslavia Marjan Pečar; Jože Zidar	273.9; 322.5	696.4
10	Austria Peter Müller; Alois Leodolter	350.4; 329.6	680.0
11	Switzerland Ueli Scheidegger; Peter Wenger	296.7; 291.4	588.1
—	France	—	—

== Hill records ==
Date	Metres	Metres	Feet
25 March 1960	(East Germany) Helmut Recknagel	124.5	408
27 March 1960	(East Germany) Helmut Recknagel	127	417
