= 1960–61 Four Hills Tournament =

Ski jumping competition

Four Hills Tournament
- Venues: Schattenbergschanze, Große Olympiaschanze, Bergiselschanze, Paul-Ausserleitner-Schanze
- Location: Germany, Austria
- Dates: 30 December 1960 – 8 January 1961
- Competitors: 75 from 12 nations

Medalists
gold medal	(East Germany) Helmut Recknagel
silver medal	(Austria) Otto Leodolter
bronze medal	(Finland) Kalevi Kärkkäinen

After the political scandal one year prior, no national flags were used at the ninth edition of the ninth annual Four Hills Tournament in Germany and Austria, only those of the host country and the hosting ski club.

East German athlete Helmut Recknagel won the tournament for a record third time after his absence the previous year.

== Participating nations and athletes ==
With the return of the East block nations, the 1960-61 tournament saw a record number of 12 participating nations.

Nation	Number of Athletes	Athletes
Germany	18	Hermann Anwander, Arthur Bodenmüller, Max Bolkart, Rudi Duffke, Alois Haberstock, Wolfgang Happle, Otto Herz, Lothar Heyer, Heini Ihle, Helmut Kurz, Edi Lengg, Siegbert Mönch, Josef Pichler, Georg Thoma, Helmut Wegscheider, Hias Winkler, Hubert Witting, Axel Zerlaut
Austria	18	Alfred Brunner, Willi Egger, Max Golser, Walter Habersatter, Ernst Kopp, Willi Köstinger, Ernst Kröll, Georg Lackner, Otto Leodolter, Sepp Lichtenegger, Heinz Moser, Horst Moser, Peter Müller, Georg Niederhammer, Alwin Plank, Baldur Preiml, Walter Steinegger, Ferdl Wallner
Czechoslovakia	3	Drahomír Jebavý, Dalibor Motejlek, Jaromír Novlud
Finland	3	Veikko Kankkonen, Juhani Kärkkäinen, Kalevi Kärkkäinen
France	2	Phil Devouassoux, Robert Rey
East Germany	9	Veit Kührt, Peter Lesser, Werner Lesser, Günter Oettel, Günther Pollmer, Helmut Recknagel, Kurt Schramm, Wolfgang Schüller, Willi Wirth
Italy	4	Giacomo Aimoni, Bruno De Zordo, Dino De Zordo, Nilo Zandanell
Norway	3	Gunnar Lie, Ole Tom Nord, Olaf Solli
Soviet Union	5	V. Ivannikov, Nikolay Kamenskiy, Nikolai Schamov, Koba Zakadze, Yuri Zubarev
Sweden	3	Harry Bergquist, Gösta Nordin, Kjell Sjöberg
Switzerland	3	Toni Cecchinato, Ueli Scheidegger, Peter Wenger
Yugoslavia	4	Peter Eržen, Miro Oman, Marjan Pečar, Jože Šlibar

== Results ==
=== Oberstdorf ===
(Germany) Schattenbergschanze, Oberstdorf
30 December 1960

Rank	Name	Points
1	(Finland) Juhani Kärkkäinen	227.0
2	(Sweden) Kjell Sjöberg	223.0
3	(Finland) Kalevi Kärkkäinen	220.0
3	(Austria) Otto Leodolter	220.0
5	(Soviet Union) Koba Zakadze	218.0
6	(East Germany) Helmut Recknagel	217.0
7	(East Germany) Veit Kührt	215.0
8	(Soviet Union) Nikolai Schamov	213.5
9	(Austria) Walter Habersatter	212.5
10	(Norway) Ole Tom Nord	211.0

=== Garmisch-Partenkirchen ===
(Germany) Große Olympiaschanze, Garmisch-Partenkirchen
1 January 1961

Rank	Name	Points
1	(Soviet Union) Koba Zakadze	220.5
2	(East Germany) Helmut Recknagel	218.0
3	(Italy) Nilo Zandanell	217.0
4	(Austria) Otto Leodolter	215.0
5	(Soviet Union) Nikolay Kamenskiy	214.0
6	(Sweden) Kjell Sjöberg	213.5
7	(Finland) Juhani Kärkkäinen	213.0
8	(Soviet Union) Yuri Zubarev	212.0
9	(Soviet Union) Nikolai Schamov	209.5
9	(East Germany) Kurt Schramm	209.5

=== Innsbruck ===
(Austria) Bergiselschanze, Innsbruck
6 January 1961

Rank	Name	Points
1	(Finland) Kalevi Kärkkäinen	218.5
2	(East Germany) Helmut Recknagel	217.6
3	(Austria) Otto Leodolter	213.4
4	(Norway) Olaf Solli	212.2
5	(Finland) Veikko Kankkonen	211.6
6	(Germany) Wolfgang Happle	211.0
7	(Soviet Union) Nikolay Kamenskiy	210.4
8	(Germany) Helmut Wegscheider	209.2
9	(Austria) Alwin Plank	207.7
10	(Sweden) Kjell Sjöberg	207.0

=== Bischofshofen ===
(Austria) Paul-Ausserleitner-Schanze, Bischofshofen
8 January 1961

In the overall lead already, Helmut Recknagel won the Bischofshofen event and thus the tournament.

Rank	Name	Points
1	(East Germany) Helmut Recknagel	229.1
2	(Austria) Otto Leodolter	225.6
3	(Finland) Kalevi Kärkkäinen	221.1
4	(Soviet Union) Nikolai Schamov	219.3
5	(Germany) Wolfgang Happle	212.8
6	(Norway) Olaf Solli	211.8
7	(Italy) Nilo Zandanell	210.0
8	(East Germany) Kurt Schramm	209.7
9	(Italy) Dino De Zordo	208.7
10	(Soviet Union) Koba Zakadze	207.7

== Final ranking ==
Rank	Name	Oberstdorf	Garmisch-Partenkirchen	Innsbruck	Bischofshofen	Points
1	(East Germany) Helmut Recknagel	6th	2nd	2nd	1st	881.7
2	(Austria) Otto Leodolter	3rd	4th	3rd	2nd	874.0
3	(Finland) Kalevi Kärkkäinen	3rd	22nd	1st	3rd	862.1
4	(Soviet Union) Koba Zakadze	5th	1st	11th	10th	851.9
5	(Finland) Juhani Kärkkäinen	1st	7th	12th	11th	850.7
6	(Sweden) Kjell Sjöberg	2nd	6th	10th	15th	848.2
7	(Italy) Nilo Zandanell	11th	3rd	14th	7th	839.6
8	(Norway) Olaf Solli	20th	26th	4th	6th	829.5
9	(Soviet Union) Nikolai Schamov	8th	9th	36th	4th	827.4
10	(Germany) Wolfgang Happle	39th	11th	6th	5th	826.8
