= 1959–60 Four Hills Tournament =

Ski jumping competition

Four Hills Tournament
- Venues: Schattenbergschanze, Große Olympiaschanze, Bergiselschanze, Paul-Ausserleitner-Schanze
- Location: Germany, Austria
- Dates: 30 December 1959 – 6 January 1960
- Competitors: 46 from 8 nations

Medalists
gold medal	(Germany) Max Bolkart
silver medal	(Austria) Alwin Plank
bronze medal	(Austria) Otto Leodolter

The eighth annual Four Hills Tournament in Germany and Austria was influenced by the German flag controversy, which led to the teams of the Warsaw Pact zone withdrawing from the tournament. In addition, Finland and Norway decided not to compete due to preparations for the upcoming 1960 Winter Olympics. Finland ultimately sent prospective athletes.

The tournament was instead dominated by the host country and for the first time, the Four Hills were won by a West German ski jumper, Max Bolkart.

== German Flag Controversy ==
For ten years after its declared independence, the German Democratic Republic continued to use the German tricolour for official use. In October 1959, they finally adapted a distinctive flag, the East German coat of arms in front of the tricolour. The Four Hills tournament starting in December 1959 was one of the first sporting events on West German ground where East German athletes were supposed to compete under the new flag.

However, it was prohibited to display the new East German flag under West German law and the hosts refused to do so in Oberstdorf. The strong East German delegation including defending champion Helmut Recknagel refused to compete under the circumstances and withdrew. Teams of countries that accepted East Germany as a sovereign nation and thus their flag, withdrew in solidarity (Czechoslovakia, Poland and the Soviet Union). Originally, it was announced that they would compete at the two events in Austria.

Austria, however, did not yet have diplomatic relations with the GDR and it was left to the local government to deal with the situation. Innsbruck mayor Alois Lugger decided not to display the East German flag either. Although he offered compromises, such as the use of the Olympic German flag or using no flags at all, the Warsaw Pact teams declared their withdrawal on the day of the Innsbruck event and left the day after.

== Participating nations and athletes ==
Many notable absences include the teams from East Germany, the Soviet Union, Poland, Czechoslovakia, Norway and the top athletes from Finland.

A French team, however, competed at the Four Hills for the first time.

Nation	Number of Athletes	Athletes
Germany	13	Hermann Anwander, Helmut Böck, Max Bolkart, Rudi Duffke, Alois Haberstock, Wolfgang Happle, Heini Ihle, Helmut Kurz, Georg Thoma, Helmut Wegscheider, Hubert Witting, Heinrich Zapf, Axel Zerlaut
Austria	14	Willi Egger, Klaus Fichtner, Walter Habersatter, Waldemar Heigenhauser, Willi Köstinger, Ernst Kröll, Lois Leodolter, Otto Leodolter, Peter Müller, Alwin Plank, Baldur Preiml, Rudi Schweinberger, Walter Steinegger, Ferdl Wallner
Canada	3	Jacques Charland, Gerry Gravelle, Luis Moser
Finland	2	Timo Kavelä, Markku Maatela
France	2	Claude Jean-Prost, Robert Rey
Sweden	4	Lars-Åke Bergseije, Holger Karlsson, Inger Lindquist, Folke Mikaelsson
Switzerland	3	Andreas Däscher, Ueli Scheidegger, Peter Wenger
Yugoslavia	5	Božo Jemc, Jože Langus, Miro Oman, Marjan Pečar, Jože Šlibar

== Results ==
=== Oberstdorf ===
(Germany) Schattenbergschanze, Oberstdorf
30 December 1959

Rank	Name	Points
1	(Germany) Max Bolkart	220.5
2	(Austria) Alwin Plank	219.5
3	(Germany) Helmut Kurz	219.0
4	(Austria) Willi Egger	217.0
4	(Sweden) Holger Karlsson	217.0
6	(Germany) Hermann Anwander	215.5
7	(Austria) Walter Habersatter	214.5
8	(Austria) Otto Leodolter	212.5
9	(Sweden) Folke Mikaelsson	212.0
9	(Germany) Georg Thoma	212.0

=== Garmisch-Partenkirchen ===
(Germany) Große Olympiaschanze, Garmisch-Partenkirchen
1 January 1960

With his ninth place in Garmisch-Partenkirchen, Jacques Charland became the first non-European with a Top-Ten-finish at a Four Hills event.

Rank	Name	Points
1	(Germany) Max Bolkart	216.9
2	(Finland) Timo Kivelä	216.5
3	(Socialist Federal Republic of Yugoslavia) Jože Šlibar	212.7
4	(Sweden) Inger Lindquist	212.6
5	(Germany) Georg Thoma	212.5
6	(Socialist Federal Republic of Yugoslavia) Božo Jemc	212.1
7	(Austria) Alwin Plank	211.2
8	(Finland) Markku Maatela	210.8
9	(Canada) Jacques Charland	210.4
10	(Austria) Willi Egger	209.8

=== Innsbruck ===
(Austria) Bergiselschanze, Innsbruck
3 January 1960

Thanks to close results so far, the overall ranking was still closely contested after the first two events. In Innsbruck however, Max Bolkart increased his lead to almost twenty points after a third, clearer victory.

Curiously, three out of four Swedish competitors shared 21st place, equal in points (198.5).

Rank	Name	Points
1	(Germany) Max Bolkart	229.5
2	(Austria) Otto Leodolter	225.5
3	(Austria) Alwin Plank	216.5
4	(Sweden) Folke Mikaelsson	215.5
5	(Germany) Georg Thoma	214.5
6	(Finland) Timo Kivelä	213.0
7	(Austria) Willi Egger	212.0
8	(Socialist Federal Republic of Yugoslavia) Božo Jemc	211.5
8	(Austria) Walter Steinegger	211.5
10	(Finland) Markku Maatela	211.0

=== Bischofshofen ===
(Austria) Paul-Ausserleitner-Schanze, Bischofshofen
6 January 1959

Max Bolkart was the third athlete within seven years to win the first three events but fail to achieve the 'Grand Slam' in Bischofshofen. He still became the first West German to win the tournament however, as Alwin Plank almost, but not quite closed the gap in the overall ranking.

The Austrians achieved their first triple victory, a feat that only the Finnish had produced so far (twice in 1954–55).

Rank	Name	Points
1	(Austria) Alwin Plank	227.5
2	(Austria) Otto Leodolter	224.7
3	(Austria) Willi Egger	221.7
4	(Germany) Helmut Kurz	216.0
5	(Germany) Max Bolkart	211.1
5	(Canada) Jacques Charland	211.1
7	(Austria) Walter Steinegger	210.8
8	(Germany) Wolfgang Happle	209.8
9	(Socialist Federal Republic of Yugoslavia) Jože Šlibar	208.9
10	(Finland) Timo Kivelä	204.3

== Final ranking ==
Rank	Name	Oberstdorf	Garmisch-Partenkirchen	Innsbruck	Bischofshofen	Points
1	(Germany) Max Bolkart	1st	1st	1st	5th	878.0
2	(Austria) Alwin Plank	2nd	7th	3rd	1st	874.7
3	(Austria) Otto Leodolter	8th	11th	2nd	2nd	870.6
4	(Austria) Willi Egger	4th	10th	7th	3rd	860.5
5	(Germany) Helmut Kurz	3rd	12th	14th	4th	849.0
6	(Finland) Timo Kivelä	11th	2nd	6th	10th	845.3
7	(Germany) Georg Thoma	9th	5th	5th	14th	839.2
8	(Austria) Walter Steinegger	23rd	14th	8th	7th	826.8
9	(Germany) Hermann Anwander	6th	20th	15th	11th	825.7
10	(Germany) Wolfgang Happle	19th	27th	17th	8th	808.7
