= 1958 U.S. Figure Skating Championships =

1958 US Figure Skating Championships
- Type: National Championship
- Date: March 26 – 29
- Season: 1957-58
- Location: Minneapolis, Minnesota
- Venue: Minneapolis Arena
- Previous: 1957 U.S. Championships
- Next: 1959 U.S. Championships

The 1958 U.S. Figure Skating Championships was held from March 26–29 at the Minneapolis Arena in Minneapolis, Minnesota. Medals were awarded in three colors: gold (first), silver (second), and bronze (third) in four disciplines – men's singles, ladies' singles, pair skating, and ice dancing – across three levels: senior, junior, and novice.

== Senior results ==
=== Men ===
| Rank | Name |
|---|---|
| 1 | David Jenkins |
| 2 | Tim Brown |
| 3 | Tom Moore |
| 4 | Robert Lee Brewer |
| 5 | Bradley Lord |
| 6 | Barlow Nelson |
| 7 | Tom Weinreich |

=== Ladies ===
| Rank | Name |
|---|---|
| 1 | Carol Heiss |
| 2 | Carol Wanek |
| 3 | Lynn Finnegan |
| 4 | Nancy Heiss |
| 5 | Claralynn Lewis |

=== Pairs ===
| Rank | Name |
|---|---|
| 1 | Nancy Ludington / Ronald Ludington |
| 2 | Sheila Wells / Robin Greiner |
| 3 | Maribel Owen / Dudley Richards |
| 4 | Ila Ray Hadley / Ray Hadley, Jr. |
| 5 | Mary Jane Watson / John Jarmon |
| 6 | Mary Kay Keller / Richard Keller |

=== Ice dancing (Gold dance) ===
| Rank | Name |
|---|---|
| 1 | Andree Anderson / Donald Jacoby |
| 2 | Claire O'Neill / John Bejshak, Jr. |
| 3 | Susan Sebo / Tim Brown |
| 4 | Margie Ackles / Charles Phillips, Jr. |
