= Norway at the 1960 Winter Olympics =

- IOC code: NOR
- NOC: Norwegian Sports Federation

in Squaw Valley
- Competitors: 29 (25 men, 4 women) in 6 sports
- Flag bearer: Knut Johannesen (Speed skating)
- Medals Ranked 4th: Gold 3 Silver 3 Bronze 0 Total 6

Winter Olympics appearances (overview)
- 1924; 1928; 1932; 1936; 1948; 1952; 1956; 1960; 1964; 1968; 1972; 1976; 1980; 1984; 1988; 1992; 1994; 1998; 2002; 2006; 2010; 2014; 2018; 2022; 2026

Norway participated at the 1960 Winter Olympics in Squaw Valley, United States, held between 18 and 28 February 1960. The country's participation in the Games marked its eighth appearance at the Winter Olympics since its debut in the 1924 Games.

The Norwegian team consisted of 29 athletes including four women who competed across six sports. Skater Knut Johannesen was the country's flag-bearer during the opening ceremony. Norway was ranked fourth in the overall medal table with six medals including three gold, and three silver.

== Background ==
Norway first competed at the 1900 Summer Olympics, and has since taken part in every Olympic Games. The country made its debut in the Winter Olympics in the inaugural 1924 Games held in Chamonix, France. The nation also hosted the 1952 Winter Olympics at Oslo. Norway's participation in the 1960 Winter Olympics marked its eighth consecutive appearance at the Winter Olympics since its debut.

The 1960 Winter Olympics were held in Squaw Valley, United States between 18 and 28 February 1960. The Norwegian delegation consisted of 29 athletes competing across six sports. Skater Knut Johannesen was the country's flag-bearer in the Parade of Nations during the opening ceremony.

== Medalists ==
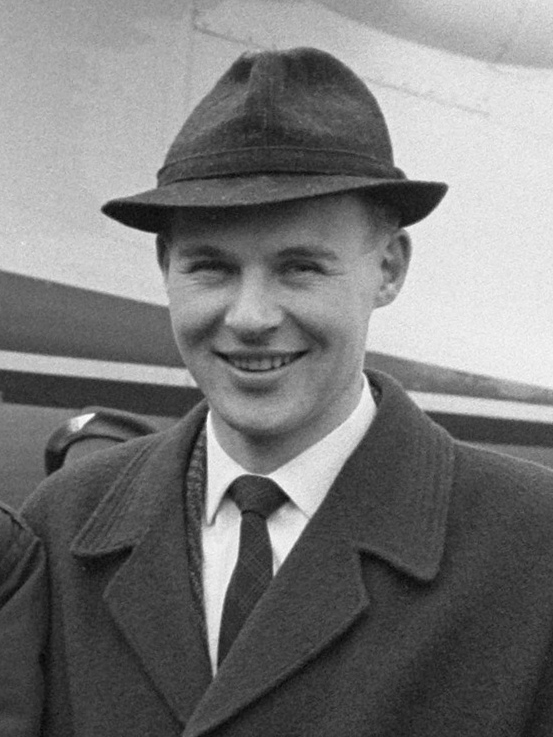
Knut Johannesen was the country's flag-bearer and won two medals in speed skating

Austria was ranked fourth in the overall medal table with six medals including three gold, and three silver. Flag-bearer Knut Johannesen won a gold and silver medal in the speed skating events.

Medal	Name	Sport	Event
Gold	Haakon Brusveen	Cross-country skiing	Men's 15 km
Gold	Roald Aas	Speed skating	Men's 1,500 m
Gold	Knut Johannesen	Speed skating	Men's 10,000 m
Silver	Harald Grønningen; Hallgeir Brenden; Einar Østby; Haakon Brusveen	Cross-country skiing	Men's 4 x 10 km relay
Silver	Tormod Knutsen	Nordic combined	Men's individual
Silver	Knut Johannesen	Speed skating	Men's 1,500 m

== Competitors ==
There were 29 athletes including four women who took part in the medal events across six sports.

Sport	Men	Women	Athletes
Alpine skiing	1	4	5
Biathlon	3	0	3
Cross-country skiing	7	0	7
Nordic combined	4	0	4
Ski jumping	4	0	4
Speed skating	6	0	6
Total	25	4	29

== Alpine skiing ==
Alpine skiing at the 1960 Winter Olympics took place at Squaw Valley Ski Resort and consisted of six events. Norway entered five competitors including four women, and was the only event in which Norwegian women took part in the Games. Oddvar Rønnestad competed in the men's events, and his best finish came in the slalom event (14th). In the women's events, Marit Haraldsen recorded the best performances with 11th and 12th place finishes in the slalom and downhill events respectively.

Men

Athlete	Event	Race 1		Race 2		Total	
Athlete	Event	Time	Rank	Time	Rank	Time	Rank
Oddvar Rønnestad	Downhill	—N/a				2:15.4	20
Oddvar Rønnestad	Giant slalom	—N/a				2:23.3	51
Oddvar Rønnestad	Slalom	1:18.8	25	1:04.5	15	2:23.3	14

Women

Athlete	Event	Race 1		Race 2		Total	
Athlete	Event	Time	Rank	Time	Rank	Time	Rank
Astrid Sandvik	Downhill	—N/a				2:02.9	37
Liv Jagge-Christiansen	Downhill	—N/a				1:51.2	30
Marit Haraldsen	Downhill	—N/a				1:42.9	12
Astrid Sandvik	Giant slalom	—N/a				1:45.4	19
Inger Bjørnbakken	Giant slalom	—N/a				1:45.5	20
Liv Jagge-Christiansen	Giant slalom	—N/a				1:46.4	24
Marit Haraldsen	Giant slalom	—N/a				DSQ	–
Astrid Sandvik	Slalom	58.1	8	1:31.3	38	2:29.4	36
Inger Bjørnbakken	Slalom	57.3	3	1:05.2	27	2:02.5	14
Liv Jagge-Christiansen	Slalom	DSQ	–	–	–	DSQ	–
Marit Haraldsen	Slalom	59.8	19	1:00.0	14	1:59.8	11

== Biathlon ==
The biathlon events were held at McKinney Creek Stadium on 21 February. The 20 km event for men had four shooting stages consisting of five shots each, with time penalties applicable for each shot missed. Three competitors competed for Norway, and Ola Wærhaug recorded the best place finish of seventh in the competition.

Event	Athlete	Time	Missed targets	Adjusted time ^{1}	Rank
Henry Hermansen	Men's 20 km	1'34:20.1	4	1'42:20.1	10
Jon Istad	Men's 20 km	1'36:53.5	4	1'44:53.5	11
Ola Wærhaug	Men's 20 km	1'36:35.8	1	1'38:35.8	7

^{1} Two minutes added per missed target.

== Cross-country skiing ==
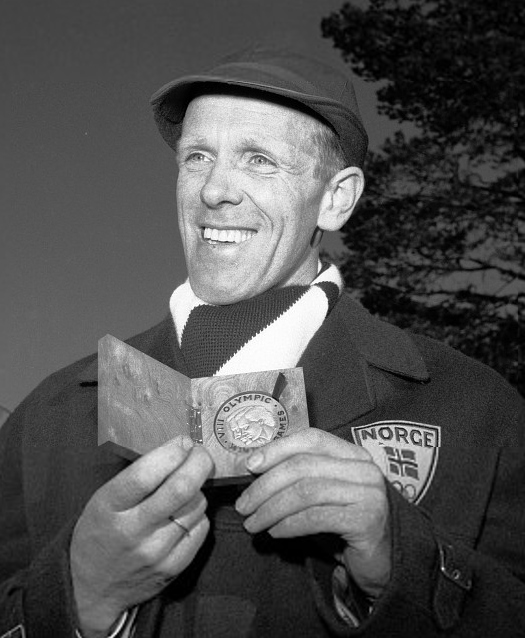
Håkon Brusveen won the country's first gold medal in the Games in the men's 15 km event

The cross-country skiing events took place between 19 and 27 February 1960 and consisted of six medal events. Norway sent the highest number of athletes (seven) to compete in the four men's events in the sport. Håkon Brusveen won the country's first gold medal in the Games in the men's 15 km event with a best time of 51 minutes and 55.5 seconds. The men's relay team consisting of Brusveen, Harald Grønningen, Hallgeir Brenden, and Einar Østby won the silver medal.

Event	Athlete	Race	
Event	Athlete	Time	Rank
Einar Østby	Men's 15 km	52:18.0	4
Håkon Brusveen	Men's 15 km	51:55.5	1st place, gold medalist(s)
Hallgeir Brenden	Men's 15 km	53:10.3	12
Harald Grønningen	Men's 15 km	53:02.2	11
Hallgeir Brenden	Men's 30 km	1'55:19.8	9
Magnar Lundemo	Men's 30 km	1'58:46.8	16
Oddmund Jensen	Men's 30 km	1'55:35.0	10
Sverre Stensheim	Men's 30 km	1'59:52.8	20
Hallgeir Brenden	Men's 50 km	3'08:23.0	9
Harald Grønningen	Men's 50 km	3'11:17.1	14
Oddmund Jensen	Men's 50 km	3'09:16.2	11
Sverre Stensheim	Men's 50 km	3'08:51.5	10
Einar Østby; Håkon Brusveen; Hallgeir Brenden; Harald Grønningen	Men's 4 x 10 km relay	2'18:46.4	2nd place, silver medalist(s)

== Nordic combined ==
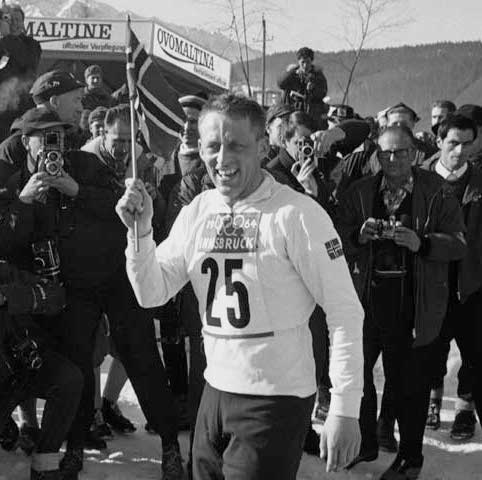
Tormod Knutsen won the silver medal in the Nordic combined event

The Nordic combined event consisted of ski jumping and 15 km (9.3 mi) cross-country skiing. It was held between 22 and 24 February at Olympic Jumping Hill. There were four Norwegian participants in the event, with Tormod Knutsen winning the silver medal.

Athlete	Event	Ski Jumping				Cross-country			Total	
Athlete	Event	Distance 1	Distance 2	Points	Rank	Time	Points	Rank	Points	Rank
Arne Larsen	Individual	67.0	64.5	215.0	5	1'01:10.1	229.613	10	444.613	6
Gunder Gundersen	Individual	58.0	63.0	205.5	14	1'01:41.9	227.548	12	433.048	11
Sverre Stenersen	Individual	61.5	63.5	205.5	14	1'00:24.0	232.581	8	438.081	7
Tormod Knutsen	Individual	61.5	67.0	217.0	4	59:31.0	236.000	5	453.000	2nd place, silver medalist(s)

== Ski jumping ==
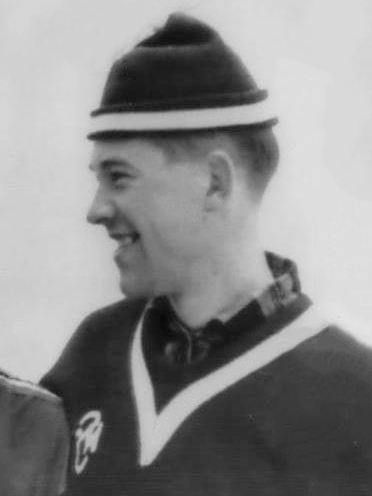
Torbjørn Yggeseth had the best result in ski jumping

Ski jumping event was held on 21 February at Olympic Jumping Hill. Austria had four entrants to the competition. Torbjørn Yggeseth had the best result in the event and finished fifth with a combined score of 216.1.

Athlete	Event	Jump 1			Jump 2			Total	
Athlete	Event	Distance	Points	Rank	Distance	Points	Rank	Points	Rank
Halvor Næs	Normal hill	86.0	103.1	16	81.5	106.7	7	209.8	11
Kåre Berg	Normal hill	83.0	100.7	19	81.5	106.7	7	207.4	13
Ole Tom Nord	Normal hill	81.0	94.6	29	82.0	105.6	10	200.2	23
Torbjørn Yggeseth	Normal hill	88.5	106.6	8	82.5	109.5	4	216.1	5

== Speed skating ==
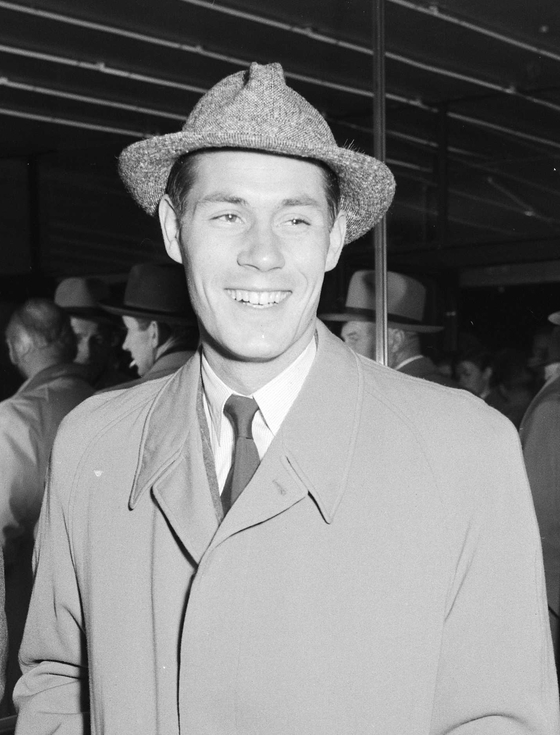
Roald Aas won the gold in the 1,500 m event

Speed skating events were held at the Speed Skating Oval. The sport resulted in the best haul of medals for Norway with two gold and one silver medal. Flag-bearer Knut Johannesen won the gold medal with a new world record in the men's 10,000 m event, and a silver in the 5,000 m event. Roald Aas won the gold in the 1,500 m event.

Event	Athlete	Race	
Event	Athlete	Time	Rank
Alv Gjestvang	Men's 500 m	40.8	6
Hroar Elvenes	Men's 500 m	41.4	14
Knut Johannesen	Men's 500 m	42.3	20
Nils Aaness	Men's 500 m	42.5	24
Hroar Elvenes	Men's 1,500 m	2:24.9	39
Knut Johannesen	Men's 1,500 m	2:14.5	11
Nils Aaness	Men's 1,500 m	DNF	–
Roald Aas	Men's 1,500 m	2:10.4	1st place, gold medalist(s)
Knut Johannesen	Men's 5,000 m	8:00.8	2nd place, silver medalist(s)
Roald Aas	Men's 5,000 m	8:30.1	25
Torstein Seiersten	Men's 5,000 m	8:05.3	4
Knut Johannesen	Men's 10,000 m	15:46.6 WR	1st place, gold medalist(s)
Roald Aas	Men's 10,000 m	17:26.8	23
Torstein Seiersten	Men's 10,000 m	16:33.4	6
