= 1957 U.S. Figure Skating Championships =

1957 US Figure Skating Championships
- Type: National Championship
- Date: March 11 – 16
- Season: 1956-57
- Location: Berkeley, California
- Previous: 1956 U.S. Championships
- Next: 1958 U.S. Championships

The 1957 U.S. Figure Skating Championships was held from March 11–16 in Berkeley, California. Medals were awarded in four disciplines – men's singles, ladies' singles, pair skating, and ice dancing – across three levels: senior, junior, and novice.

== Senior results ==
=== Men ===
Rank	Name
1	David Jenkins
2	Tim Brown
3	Tom Moore
4	Robert Lee Brewer
5	Raymond Blommer
6	Tom Weinreich
7	Barlow Nelson
8	Richard Swenning

=== Ladies ===
Rank	Name
1	Carol Heiss
2	Joan Schenke
3	Claralynn Lewis
4	Nancy Heiss
5	Charlene Adams
6	Sherry Dorsey
7	Gladys Jacobs
8	Carol Keyes

=== Pairs ===
Rank	Name
1	Nancy Rouillard / Ronald Ludington
2	Mary Jane Watson / John Jarmon
3	Anita Tefkin / James Barlow

=== Ice dancing (Gold dance) ===
Rank	Name
1	Sharon McKenzie / Bert Wright
2	Andree Anderson / Donald Jacoby
3	Joan Zamboni / Roland Junso
4	Carmel Bodel / Edward Bodel
5	Aileen Kahre / Charles Phillips, Jr.
6	Susan Sebo / Tim Brown
