= Speed skating at the 1960 Winter Olympics – Men's 1500 metres =

Speed skating at the Olympics

Men's 500 metres speed skating at the VIII Olympic Winter Games
- Pictogram for speed skating
- Venue: Squaw Valley Olympic Skating Rink
- Date: 26 February 1960
- Competitors: 48 from 16 nations
- Winning time: 2:10.4

Medalists
| 1st place, gold medalist(s) | | Roald Aas | Norway |
| 1st place, gold medalist(s) | | Yevgeny Grishin | Soviet Union |
| 3rd place, bronze medalist(s) | | Boris Stenin | Soviet Union |

The 1500 metres speed skating event was part of the speed skating at the 1960 Winter Olympics programme. The competition was held on the Squaw Valley Olympic Skating Rink and for the first time at the Olympics on artificially frozen ice. It was held on Friday, February 26, 1960. Forty-eight speed skaters from 16 nations competed.

== Medalists ==
| Gold | Silver | Bronze |
|---|---|---|
| Roald Aas (NOR) Yevgeny Grishin (URS) | no silver awarded as there was a tie for gold | Boris Stenin (URS) |

== Records ==
These were the standing world and Olympic records (in minutes) prior to the 1960 Winter Olympics.

| World record | 2:06.3(*) | (Finland) Juhani Järvinen | Squaw Valley/Squaw Valley Olympic Skating Rink (USA) | March 1, 1959 |
| Olympic record | 2:08.6(**) | (Soviet Union) Yevgeny Grishin | Cortina d'Ampezzo/Lake Misurina (ITA) | January 30, 1956 |
| Olympic record | 2:08.6(**) | (Soviet Union) Yuri Mikhaylov | Cortina d'Ampezzo/Lake Misurina (ITA) | January 30, 1956 |

(*) The record was set in a high altitude venue (more than 1000 metres above sea level) and on artificially frozen ice.

(**) The record was set in a high altitude venue (more than 1000 metres above sea level) and on naturally frozen ice.

== Results ==
Yevgeny Grishin who was the first speed skater to defend his 500 metres Olympic title was also able to repeat his win in the 1500 metres event. In 1956 he shared the win with fellow countryman Yuri Mikhaylov. This time Grishin tied with Roald Aas. Grishin was the second speed skater to win two gold medals in 1500 metres competitions after Clas Thunberg won in 1924 and 1928.

| Place | Speed skater | Time |
|---|---|---|
| 1 | Roald Aas (NOR) | 2:10.4 |
| 1 | Yevgeny Grishin (URS) | 2:10.4 |
| 3 | Boris Stenin (URS) | 2:11.5 |
| 4 | Jouko Jokinen (FIN) | 2:12.0 |
| 5 | Juhani Järvinen (FIN) | 2:13.1 |
| 5 | Per-Olof Brogren (SWE) | 2:13,1 |
| 7 | Toivo Salonen (FIN) | 2:13,1 |
| 8 | André Kouprianoff (FRA) | 2:13.3 |
| 9 | Helmut Kuhnert (EUA) | 2:13.6 |
| 10 | Raymond Gilloz (FRA) | 2:14.2 |
| 11 | Knut Johannesen (NOR) | 2:14.5 |
| 12 | Gennadi Voronin (URS) | 2:14.7 |
| 13 | Kurt Stille (DEN) | 2:15.8 |
| 14 | Colin Hickey (AUS) | 2:16.1 |
| 15 | Wim de Graaff (NED) | 2:16.5 |
| 15 | Gunnar Sjölin (SWE) | 2:16.5 |
| 17 | Dick Hunt (USA) | 2:17.7 |
| 18 | Olle Dahlberg (SWE) | 2:18.3 |
| 18 | Manfred Schüler (EUA) | 2:18.3 |
| 20 | Mario Gios (ITA) | 2:18.6 |
| 21 | Fumio Nagakubo (JPN) | 2:18.7 |
| 22 | Floyd Bedbury (USA) | 2:18.9 |
| 23 | Keijo Tapiovaara (FIN) | 2:19.2 |
| 24 | Hermann Strutz (AUT) | 2:19.4 |
| 25 | Antonio Nitto (ITA) | 2:19.6 |
| 26 | Terry Monaghan (GBR) | 2:19.9 |
| 27 | Renato De Riva (ITA) | 2:20.6 |
| 28 | Bo Karenus (SWE) | 2:21.1 |
| 29 | Yoshitaki Hori (JPN) | 2:21.7 |
| 29 | Keith Meyer (USA) | 2:21.7 |
| 31 | Harald Norden (EUA) | 2:22.1 |
| 31 | Lev Zaytsev (URS) | 2:22.1 |
| 33 | Takeo Mizoo (JPN) | 2:22.6 |
| 34 | Shuji Kobayashi (JPN) | 2:23.0 |
| 35 | Eddie Rudolph (USA) | 2:23.1 |
| 36 | Ralf Olin (CAN) | 2:23.5 |
| 37 | Roy Tutty (AUS) | 2:23.8 |
| 38 | Günther Tilch (EUA) | 2:24.8 |
| 39 | Hroar Elvenes (NOR) | 2:24.9 |
| 40 | Terry Malkin (GBR) | 2:25.0 |
| 41 | Jang Yeong (KOR) | 2:25.3 |
| 42 | Choi Yeong-bae (KOR) | 2:26.7 |
| 43 | Johnny Sands (CAN) | 2:28.4 |
| 44 | Jang In-won (KOR) | 2:30.7 |
| 45 | Larry Mason (CAN) | 2:35.3 |
| — | Nils Aaness (NOR) | DNF |
| — | Henk van der Grift (NED) | DNF |
| — | Franz Offenberger (AUT) | DNF |
