= Figure skating at the 1960 Winter Olympics – Men's singles =

Men's singles at the VIII Olympic Winter Games
- Venue: Blyth Arena; Squaw Valley, California, United States
- Dates: 24 February 1960; 26 February 1960
- Competitors: 19 from 10 nations

Medalists
1st place, gold medalist(s)		David Jenkins	United States
2nd place, silver medalist(s)		Karol Divín	Czechoslovakia
3rd place, bronze medalist(s)		Donald Jackson	Canada

The men's single skating competition of the 1960 Winter Olympics was held at the Blyth Arena in Squaw Valley, California, United States. The compulsory figures section took place on Wednesday 24 February 1960 with the free skating section concluding the event two days later. Each judge ranked each skater by Ordinal Placement from first to last place. If a skater was ranked first by a majority of the judges, that skater was placed first overall, this process was repeated for each place. If more than one skater had a majority ranking for the same position then a series of tiebreaks were in place, indicated in order in the result section.

David Jenkins won gold for the United States succeeding his older brother Hayes Alan Jenkins. Karol Divín of Czechoslovakia took silver after leading after the compulsory section.

== Results ==
Pl.	Name	Nation	MP	TOOM	TO	TP	CFP
1	David Jenkins	United States	8x1+	8.0	10.0	1440.2	775.2
2	Karol Divín	Czechoslovakia	5x2+	9.0	22.0	1414.3	797.7
3	Donald Jackson	Canada	5x3+	14.0	31.0	1401.0	751.4
4	Alain Giletti	France	7x4+	21.0	31.0	1399.2	762.7
5	Tim Brown	United States	7x5+	31.0	43.0	1374.1	748.9
6	Alain Calmat	France	7x6+	40.0	54.0	1340.3	725.2
7	Robert Brewer	United States	5x7+	33.0	66.0	1320.3	724.6
8	Manfred Schnelldorfer	United Team of Germany	5x8+	37.0	75.0	1303.3	718.4
9	Tilo Gutzeit	United Team of Germany	7x9+	61.0	86.0	1274.0	706.7
10	Donald McPherson	Canada	8x10+	72.0	83.0	1279.7	676.0
11	Hubert Köpfler	Switzerland	6x12+	71.0	114.0	1217.0	668.1
12	Robin Jones	Great Britain	6x13+	69.0	113.0	1220.4	653.1
13	Peter Jonas	Austria	6x13+	70.0	115.0	1213.2	665.4
14	Nobuo Sato	Japan	8x14+	105.0	120.0	1206.8	678.0
15	David Clements	Great Britain	6x16+	84.0	135.0	1174.7	625.6
16	Bodo Bockenauer	United Team of Germany	6x16+	86.0	137.0	1162.2	612.9
17	Tim Spencer	Australia	6x16+	91.0	142.0	1171.2	612.3
18	Bill Cherrell	Australia	9x18+	162.0	162.0	1042.2	553.8
WD	Norbert Felsinger	Austria	DNF				

Referee:

- Rudolf Marx

Assistant Referee:

- Harold G. Storke

Judges:

- (Austria) Franz Wojtanowskyj
- (Canada) John Greig
- (Czechoslovakia) Emil Skákala
- (France) Gérard Rodrigues Henriques
- (Germany) Theo Klemm
- (United Kingdom) Geoffrey S. Yates
- (Japan) Shotaro Kobayashi
- (Switzerland) Emile Finsterwald
- (United States) Deane McMinn
