= Charland =

Charland may refer to:

== Persons ==
- Jacques Charland (1930–2013), Canadian ski jumper
- Pierre Charland (born 1962), Canadian Catholic bishop
- Rene Charland (1928–2013), American racing driver

== Toponyms ==
- Charland River, a tributary of the St. Lawrence River, flowing in Saint-Augustin-de-Desmaures, Quebec, Canada
