= Kärkinen =

Kärkinen is a Finnish surname. Notable people with the surname include:

- Juhani Kärkinen (1935–2019), Finnish ski jumper
- Kaija Kärkinen (born 1962), Finnish singer and actress
- Kalevi Kärkinen (1934–2004), Finnish ski jumper, brother of Juhani
