= Kotlarek =

Kotlarek is a surname. Notable people with the surname include:

- Gene Kotlarek (1940–2017), American ski jumper
- George Kotlarek (1912–1993), American ski jumper
