= Kåre Berg (disambiguation) =

Kåre Berg may refer to:

- Kåre Berg – Norwegian professor in medical genetics
- Kåre Bergstrøm – Swedish photographer
- Kåre Magnus Bergh – Norwegian television presenter
- Kåre Berg (ski jumper) – Norwegian ski jumper
