= Anita Tefkin =

American pair skater (1932–2016)

Personal information
- Other names: Anita Silverstein
- Born: Anita Marie Diamond; May 16, 1932 Long Beach, California, U.S.
- Died: July 22, 2016 (aged 84)

Figure skating career
- Country: United States
- Discipline: Pair skating
- Partner: James Barlow

Anita Marie Diamond Tefkin Silverstein (May 16, 1932 – July 22, 2016) was an American pair skater. Competing with James Barlow, she won the senior pairs title at the 1957 Pacific Coast Sectional Figure Skating Championships and the bronze medal at the 1957 U.S. Figure Skating Championships.

== Career ==
Tefkin, who was born in Long Beach, California, teamed with James Barlow for the 1956–57 senior pairs season. Barlow had previously won the Pacific Coast senior pairs title in 1955 with Patricia Kilgore and in 1956 with Carol Lux; with Tefkin he won the regional title a third consecutive year in 1957.

The pair advanced from the Pacific Coast section to the 1957 U.S. Figure Skating Championships, held March 11–16, 1957 at the East Bay Iceland rink in Berkeley, California. None of the medalists from the 1956 U.S. Championships had returned to defend their placements, leaving a wide-open senior pairs field. Tefkin and Barlow finished third behind gold medalists Nancy Rouillard and Ron Ludington and silver medalists Mary Jane Watson and John Jarmon.

== Competitive highlights ==
Pair skating with James Barlow

Event	1957
U.S. Championships	3rd
Pacific Coast Sectionals	1st
