= Kalevi Kärkinen =

Finnish ski jumper (1934–2004)

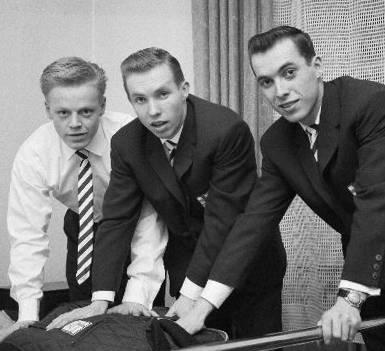
- L-r: Veikko Kankkonen, and Juhani and Kalevi Kärkinen in 1960

Personal information
- Born: 15 August 1934 Helsinki, Finland
- Died: 8 April 2004 (aged 69) Lahti, Finland

Sport
- Sport: Ski jumping

Kalevi Kärkinen (15 August 1934 – 8 April 2004) was a Finnish ski jumper who competed in the early 1960s. He won the event in Innsbruck during the 1960–61 Four Hills Tournament His younger brother Juhani was also an international ski jumper.
