= Bodo Bockenauer =

German figure skater

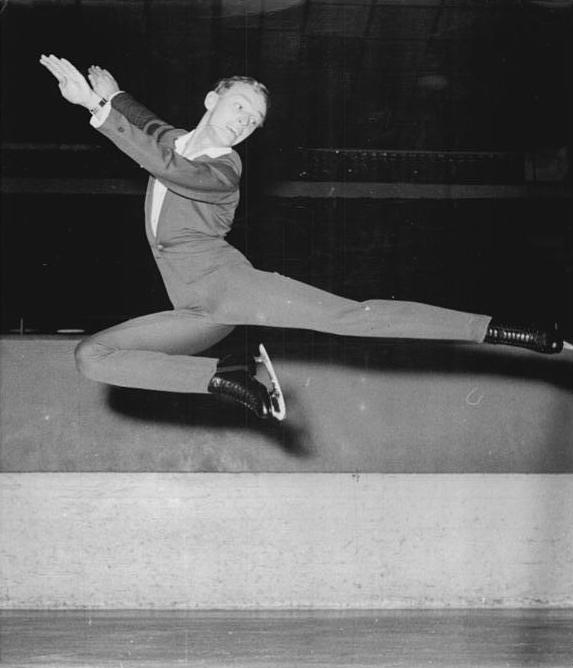
- Bockenauer in 1961

Personal information
- Born: 22 December 1940 (age 85) Berlin, Germany

Figure skating career
- Country: West Germany; East Germany; United Team of Germany
- Retired: 1967

Bodo Bockenauer (born 22 December 1940) is a German former figure skater. He is a two-time Blue Swords champion, a three-time East German national champion, and represented the United Team of Germany at the 1960 Winter Olympics, finishing 16th. His best ISU Championship result, sixth, came at the 1962 European Championships.

== Career ==
Coached by Inge Wischnewski, Bockenauer trained at SC Dynamo Berlin and represented East Germany internationally for most of his competitive career. At the 1960 Winter Olympics in Squaw Valley, California, he competed as part of the United Team of Germany and finished 16th.

Bockenauer's best season was 1961–62. After winning the 1961 Blue Swords and his third national title, he placed sixth at the 1962 European Championships in Geneva and 11th at the 1962 World Championships in Prague. He repeated as Blue Swords champion the following season.

Bockenauer defected to West Germany on 20 December 1963 in West Berlin, soon after arriving at a qualifying competition for the German unified team to the 1964 Olympics. Though he originally intended to join an ice show, he eventually began competing for West Germany. After winning the national silver medal, he was sent to the 1966 World Championships and finished 20th. In 1968, he began coaching at SC Küsnacht in Switzerland.

== Competitive highlights ==
| Event | 58–59 | 59–60 | 60–61 | 61–62 | 62–63 | 63–64 | 64–65 | 65–66 | 66–67 |
|---|---|---|---|---|---|---|---|---|---|
| Winter Olympics | | 16th | | | | | | | |
| World Championships | | | | 11th | | | | 20th | |
| European Championships | 13th | 15th | 8th | 6th | | | | | |
| Blue Swords | | | | 1st | 1st | | | | |
| West German Championships | | | | | | | 3rd | 2nd | 6th |
| East German Championships | | 1st | 1st | 1st | | | | | |
| Czechoslovak Championships (Guest) | | | | 2nd | | | | | |
