= Jože Šlibar =

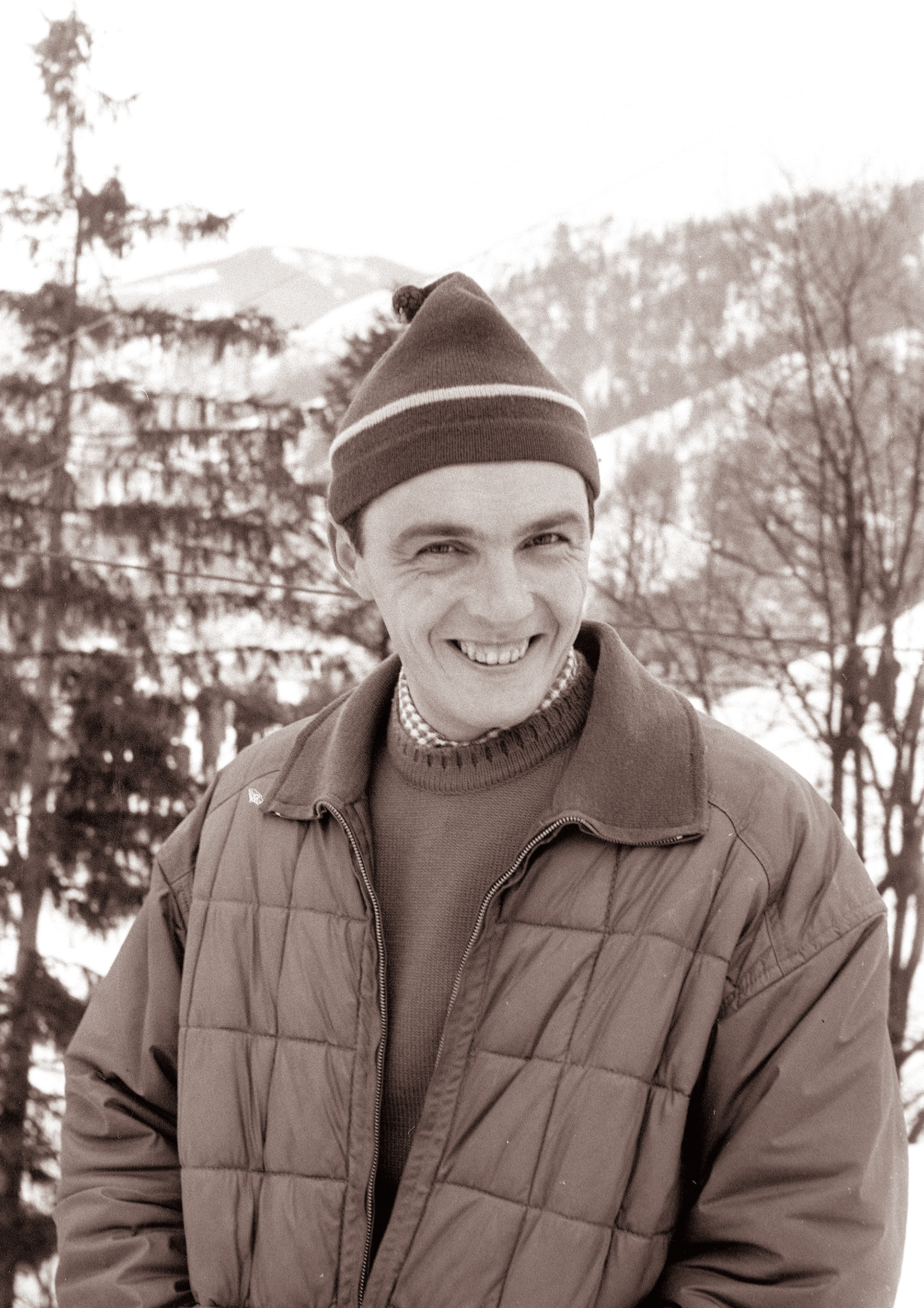
- Jože Šlibar in 1962

Personal information
- Nationality: Yugoslavia
- Born: 18 March 1934 (age 92) Kovor, Drava Banovina, Kingdom of Yugoslavia

Sport
- Sport: Skiing

Achievements and titles
- Personal bests: 141 m (463 ft); Oberstdorf, West Germany (24 February 1961)

Jože Šlibar (born 18 March 1934) is a Yugoslav former ski jumper.

== Career ==
On 24 February 1961, he set the ski jumping world record at 141 metres (463 ft) in Oberstdorf, West Germany, which he held and shared for the next three years together with Peter Lesser and Kjell Sjöberg.

It was Yugoslav record until 1969. His best performance at Four Hills Tournament in 1959/60 was 14th place overall. In 1962 he performed at World Championships in Zakopane where he took 31st place at normal and 47th place at large hill. In 2012 he was inducted into Slovenian Athletes Hall of Fame which was founded one year earlier.

I held myself by the fence and pushed down very hard. I knew I had perfect timing at the take-off table immediately. Flying in the air, I was above the 140m mark and said to myself, "just hold on" and landed in the telemark. I took my skis off and waited for the length to be published. which lasted 30 minutes.

— Šlibar's statement after WR

== Four Hills Tournament ==
=== Overall standings ===
Season	Rank	Points
1959/60	14th	801.1
1960/61	40th	731.7
1961/62	55th	558.4

== Ski jumping world record ==
Date	Hill	Location	Metres	Feet
24 February 1961	Heini-Klopfer-Skiflugschanze	Oberstdorf, West Germany	141	463
