= Régis Rey =

French ski jumper (1929–2022)

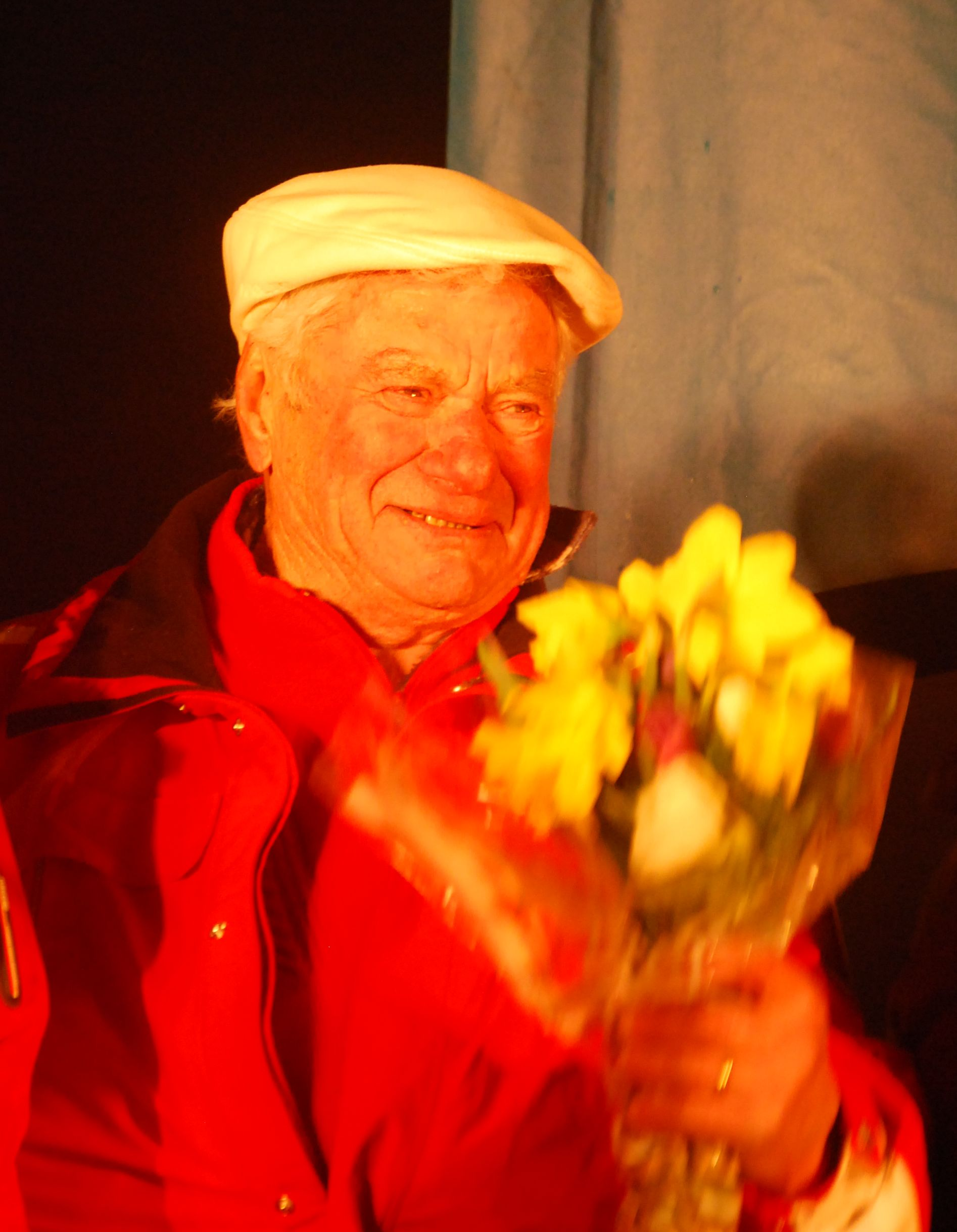
- Régis Rey in 2014

Personal information
- Born: 8 April 1929 Chamonix-Mont-Blanc, France
- Died: 6 April 2022 (aged 92) Sallanches, France

Sport
- Country: France
- Sport: Ski jumping

Régis Rey (8 April 1929 – 6 April 2022) was a French ski jumper who competed in the early 1950s. He finished 38th in the individual large hill event at the 1952 Winter Olympics in Oslo. He was an older brother of Robert Rey. Régis Rey died in Sallanches on 6 April 2022, at the age of 92.

== Sources ==
- Olympic ski jumping results: 1948-60
