= Harald Norden =

German speed skater

Personal information
- Nationality: German
- Born: 15 December 1933 (age 91); Frankenhausen, Germany

Sport
- Sport: Speed skating

Harald Norden (born 15 December 1933) is a German former speed skater. He competed in the men's 1500 metres event at the 1960 Winter Olympics.
