= Donald Jackson (figure skater) =

Canadian figure skater

Donald Jackson CM OOnt
Personal information
- Full name: Donald George Jackson
- Born: April 2, 1940 (age 86) Oshawa, Ontario, Canada

Figure skating career
- Country: Canada
- Partner: Barbara Jackson
Medal record
Representing Canada
Men's Figure skating
Olympic Games
Bronze medal – third place	1960 Squaw Valley	Men's singles
World Championships
Gold medal – first place	1962 Prague	Men's singles
Silver medal – second place	1960 Vancouver	Men's singles
Silver medal – second place	1959 Colorado Springs	Men's singles
North American Championships
Gold medal – first place	1961 Philadelphia	Men's singles
Gold medal – first place	1959 Toronto	Men's singles

Olympic medal record

Men's figure skating

Representing Canada
Bronze medal – third place	1960 Squaw Valley	Singles

Donald George Jackson CM OOnt (born April 2, 1940) is a Canadian retired figure skater. He is the 1962 World Champion, four-time Canadian national champion, and 1960 Olympic bronze medallist. At the 1962 World Figure Skating Championships in Prague, Czechoslovakia, he landed the first triple Lutz jump in international competition and won the world title.

== Biography ==
Jackson was coached by Pierre Brunet in New York City, where he lived with the family of 1960 Olympic Champion Carol Heiss.

He won a bronze medal at the 1960 Winter Olympics at the age of 19.

In both 1959 and 1960, he won a silver medal at the World Championships. The 1961 event was cancelled after a plane crash that killed many of Jackson's contemporaries in the US figure skating team. He had not been scheduled to attend the championships that year and was luckily not on board the fatal flight. In 1962, at the World Championships in Prague, Czechoslovakia, Jackson became world champion and made history by landing the first triple Lutz in international competition.

He was inducted into Canada's Sports Hall of Fame in 1962, and the World Figure Skating Hall of Fame in 1977.

Jackson is the former director of skating and was also a coach at the Minto Skating Club in Ottawa, Ontario.

In 1997, he was appointed a Member of the Order of Canada (CM). He was inducted into the Ontario Sports Hall of Fame in 2001.

In 2004, Jackson was included in the first induction of the Lisgar Collegiate Institute Athletic Wall of Fame, as part of the 160th anniversary celebrations.

In 2012, he was made a Member of the Order of Ontario (OOnt).

In May 2016, aged 76 Jackson appeared in a couple of Stars on Ice shows in Canada, performing a duet with Kurt Browning. His part included an Axel jump and a waltz jump.

== Results ==
Event	1955	1956	1957	1958	1959	1960	1961	1962
Winter Olympics						3rd		
World Championships			7th	4th	2nd	2nd	—	1st
North American Championships			4th		1st		1st	
Canadian Championships	1st J	2nd	2nd	2nd	1st	1st	1st	1st
