= Bo Karenus =

Swedish speed skater

Personal information
- Nationality: Swedish
- Born: 10 March 1937; Uppsala, Sweden
- Died: 25 October 2007 (aged 70); Uppsala, Sweden

Sport
- Sport: Speed skating

Bo Karenus (10 March 1937 – 25 October 2007) was a Swedish speed skater. He competed in the men's 1500 metres event at the 1960 Winter Olympics.
