= Olavi Hirvonen =

American cross-country skier (1930–2024)

Personal information
- Nationality: American
- Born: December 26, 1930 Montreal, Quebec, Canada
- Died: September 30, 2024 (aged 93) New York, U.S.

Sport
- Sport: Cross-country skiing

Olavi Hirvonen (December 26, 1930 – September 30, 2024) was an American cross-country skier. He competed in the men's 15 kilometre event at the 1960 Winter Olympics. In 1978, he founded Lapland Lake Nordic Vacation Center, a ski resort in Benson, NY. He operated the resort until he sold it to Kathryn and Paul Zahray in 2014. Hirvonen died on September 30, 2024, at the age of 93.
