= Sven Johanson =

American cross-country skier (1924–1976)

Personal information
- Nationality: American
- Born: November 25, 1924 Kalix, Sweden
- Died: September 11, 1976 (aged 51) Eagle River, Alaska, United States

Sport
- Sport: Cross-country skiing

Sven Johanson (November 25, 1924 – September 11, 1976) was an American cross-country skier. He competed in the men's 30 kilometre event at the 1960 Winter Olympics.
