= Inge Lindqvist =

Swedish ski jumper (1935–2025)

Personal information
- Nationality: Swedish
- Born: 13 March 1935 Eda, Sweden
- Died: 18 June 2025 (aged 90)

Sport
- Sport: Ski jumping

Inge Lindqvist (13 March 1935 – 18 June 2025) was a Swedish ski jumper. He competed in the individual event at the 1960 Winter Olympics. He died on 18 June 2025, at the age of 90.
