= Floyd Bedbury =

American speed skater

Floyd Bedbury (July 24, 1937 – March 25, 2011) was an American speed skater, born in Saint Paul, Minnesota. As a youth, he traveled to Hamar, Norway, to develop as an athlete. He participated in the 1960 Winter Olympics in Squaw Valley and the 1964 Winter Olympics in Innsbruck, competing in the 1500 meters and 5000 meters in 1960 (placing 22nd and 30th respectively), and in the 1500 meters in 1964 (placing 42nd). He held U.S. records in both the 1,500, 5,000, and the 10,000 meters. After retiring from active competition, Bedbury continued to work with speed skating as a coach.
