= Charland River =

Watercourse in Portneuf, Québec, Canada

- Location within Quebec

Location
- Country: Canada
- Province: Quebec
- Region: Capitale-Nationale
- Regional County Municipality: Portneuf Regional County Municipality
- Municipality: Saint-Augustin-de-Desmaures

Physical characteristics
- Source: Urban stream
  - location: Saint-Augustin-de-Desmaures
  - coordinates: 46.74260°N 71.48407°W
  - elevation: 55
- Mouth: St. Lawrence River
  - location: Saint-Augustin-de-Desmaures
  - coordinates: 46.72722°N 71.45834°W
  - elevation: 4 m
- Length: 30 km (19 mi)

The Charland River is a tributary of the northwest shore of the St. Lawrence River, flowing in the municipality of Saint-Augustin-de-Desmaures, in the Agglomération de Québec, in the administrative region of Capitale-Nationale, in the province from Quebec, to Canada.

The Charland river valley is mainly served by route 138 (north), chemin du Roy (south) and rue du Brome (along the upper part of the river), especially for the needs of agriculture and residents of the urban area of Saint-Augustin-de-Desmaures, are the two main economic activities in this area.

The surface of the Charland River (except the rapids areas) is generally frozen from the beginning of December to the end of March; safe circulation on the ice is generally done from the end of December to the beginning of March. The water level of the river varies with the seasons and the precipitation; the spring flood occurs in March or April.

== Geography ==
The Charland River has its source on the south side of route 138, at the western limit of the urban part of Saint-Augustin-de-Desmaures. This source is located 1.5 kilometres (0.93 mi) southeast of the Canadian Pacific Railway, 1.2 kilometres (0.75 mi) west of the village center from Saint-Augustin-de-Desmaures, 1.6 kilometres (0.99 mi) north-west of the St. Lawrence River, 1.9 kilometres (1.2 mi) northwest of its mouth.

From its source, the Charland River flows over a distance of 3.0 kilometres (1.9 mi), with a drop of 51 metres (167 ft), according to the following segments:

- 1.6 kilometres (0.99 mi) south-east passing from the west side of the urban area of Saint-Augustin-de-Desmaures, to a bend in the river;
- 0.7 kilometres (0.43 mi) towards the northeast by forking towards the southeast, up to Chemin du Roy;
- 0.7 kilometres (0.43 mi) south-east in an agricultural zone, to its mouth.

The Charland River flows on the northwest bank of the St. Lawrence River. This confluence is located 12.9 kilometres (8.0 mi) southwest of the Pierre Laporte Bridge and 4.1 kilometres (2.5 mi) southwest of the center of Saint-Augustin-de-Desmaures.

== Toponymy ==
The term "Charland" turns out to be a family name of French origin.

The toponym "Charland river" was formalized on June 29, 1983 at the Commission de toponymie du Québec.

== Appendices ==
=== Related articles ===
- Agglomération de Québec
- Saint-Augustin-de-Desmaures
- List of rivers of Quebec
