= George Kotlarek =

American ski jumper (1912–1993)

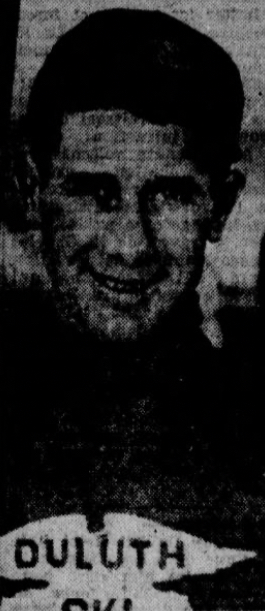
- Kotlarek in a 1936 publication or Le Messager

Personal information
- Born: George Stanley Kotlarek; 1912 Duluth, Minnesota, US
- Died: 1993 (aged 80–81)

Sport
- Sport: Ski jumping
- Club: Duluth XC Ski Club

George Stanley Kotlarek (1912 – 1993) was an American ski jumper.

== Biography ==
Born in 1912, in Duluth, Minnesota, Kotlarek began skiing as a child. In 1936, he won the class A division of the NSA National Championship Tournament, along with Eugene Wilson of the B division. He won the A division championship again in 1954, along with Ted Lahner of the B division.

Kotlarek was inducted in the National Ski Hall of Fame in 1968. He is also the father of Gene Kotlarek. He died in 1993, aged 80 or 81.
