= Svein Bergersen =

Norwegian footballer (1930-2005)

Personal information
- Full name: Svein Mikal Bergersen
- Date of birth: 6 August 1930
- Date of death: 14 October 2005 (aged 75)
- Position: Defender

International career
| Years | Team | Apps | (Gls) |
| 1955–1959 | Norway | 3 | (0) |

Svein Bergersen (6 August 1930 – 14 November 2005) was a Norwegian footballer. He played in three matches for the Norway national football team from 1955 to 1959.
