= Alois Leodolter =

Austrian Nordic combined skier (1931–2026)

Personal information
- Nationality: Austrian
- Born: 16 August 1931 Mariazell, Styria, Austria
- Died: 25 August 2026 (aged 95)

Sport
- Sport: Nordic combined

Alois Leodolter (16 August 1931 – 25 August 2026) was an Austrian skier. He competed in the Nordic combined event at the 1960 Winter Olympics.

Leodolter died on 25 August 2026, at the age of 95.
