= Claude Jean-Prost =

French ski jumper (1936–2018)

Personal information
- Nationality: French
- Born: 20 November 1936; Prémanon, France
- Died: 7 January 2018 (aged 81)

Sport
- Sport: Ski jumping

Claude Jean-Prost (20 November 1936 – 7 January 2018) was a French ski jumper. He competed in the individual event at the 1960 Winter Olympics.
