= Peter Lahdenpera =

American skier (1935–2019)

Personal information
- Nationality: American
- Born: December 29, 1935 Helsinki, Finland
- Died: July 3, 2019 (aged 83)

Sport
- Sport: Biathlon, cross-country skiing

Peter Lahdenpera (December 29, 1935 – July 3, 2019) was an American skier. He competed at the 1960 Winter Olympics, 1964 Winter Olympics, and 1972 Winter Olympics. Lahpendera was the director of the United States biathlon team at the 1976 Winter Olympics. Lahdenpera had emigrated to the United States from Finland.
