= Bengt Eriksson =

Swedish skier (1931–2014)

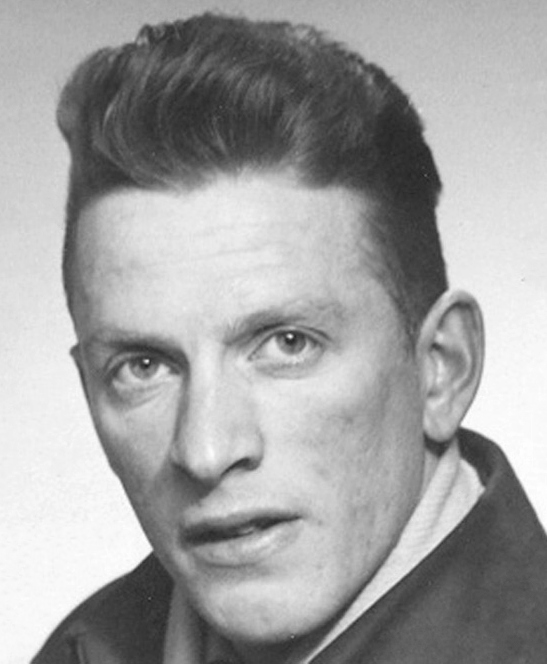

Personal information
- Born: 22 January 1931 Malung, Sweden
- Died: 19 November 2014 (aged 83) Hudiksvall, Sweden

Sport
- Sport: Nordic combined
- Club: IF Friska Viljor, Örnsköldsvik
Medal record
Representing Sweden
Olympic Games
Silver medal – second place	1956 Cortina d'Ampezzo	Individual

Bengt Eriksson (22 January 1931 – 19 November 2014) was a Swedish Nordic combined skier. He won an individual silver medal at the 1956 Winter Olympics and finished 10th at the 1960 Games. Between 1953 and 1966 he won eight national titles. He also competed nationally in association football and internationally in ski jumping, finishing 19th at the 1960 Olympics. In 1965 he was awarded the Holmenkollen medal, shared with Arto Tiainen and Arne Larsen.
