= Willy Köstinger =

Austrian Nordic combined skier

Wilhelm "Willy" Köstinger (14 December 1940 in Innsbruck - 7 January 2014 in Seefeld in Tirol) was an Austrian Nordic combined skier who competed in the early 1960s. He is best known for his sixth place in the Nordic combined event at the 1962 FIS Nordic World Ski Championships in Zakopane. Köstinger also finished tenth in the Nordic combined event at the 1964 Winter Olympics in Innsbruck. Twelve years later, he took the Judge's Oath at the 1976 Winter Olympics, also held in Innsbruck.
