= Dick Hunt (speed skater) =

American speed skater

Personal information
- Born: October 31, 1935 (age 90) Los Angeles, California, United States

Sport
- Sport: Speed skating

Dick Hunt (born October 31, 1935) is an American speed skater. He competed at the 1960 Winter Olympics and the 1964 Winter Olympics.
