= Kåre Berg (ski jumper) =

Norwegian ski jumper (1932–2021)

Kåre Olaf Berg
Personal information
- Nationality: Norwegian
- Born: 8 September 1932; Gran Municipality, Norway
- Died: 12 December 2021 (aged 89); Gran, Norway

Sport
- Sport: Ski jumping
- Club: SFK Lyn

Kåre Olaf Berg (8 September 1932 – 12 December 2021) was a Norwegian ski jumper. He competed in the individual event at the 1960 Winter Olympics. He died in Gran on 12 December 2021, at the age of 89.
