= Gerry Gravelle =

Canadian ski jumper (1934–2022)

Gerry Gravelle (15 December 1934 – 29 December 2022) was a Canadian ski jumper from Hull, Québec. Gravelle competed in the 1960 Winter Olympics He finished in equal 34th place alongside Willi Egger of Austria, in Large Hill, Individual Ski Jumping. Gravelle was part of the Canadian Olympic team for seven years. He suffered an accident at the 1962 World Championships, fractured his ribs.
