= Ila Ray Hadley =

American pair skater

- Ila Ray Hadley

Personal information
- Full name: Ila Ray Hadley
- Born: September 18, 1942 Renton, Washington, United States
- Died: February 15, 1961 (aged 18) Berg-Kampenhout, Flemish Brabant, Belgium
- Cause of death: Plane crash

Figure skating career
- Country: United States
- Skating club: Seattle Skating Club

Ila Ray Hadley (September 18, 1942 – February 15, 1961), was an American figure skater who competed in pairs and ice dance with her brother Ray Hadley, Jr.

Hadley was born in Renton, Washington to Ray Hadley Sr. and his first wife, Betty Ward. Her parents divorced and both parents remarried. Her father, a one-time roller skating champion, and stepmother, Alvah "Linda" Hart Hadley, a former ice skater and roller skater, opened their own skating rink to give Ila Ray and Ray more time on the ice. Ila Ray and her brother won the bronze medal in pairs at the 1960 United States Figure Skating Championships and competed in the Winter Olympics and World Figure Skating Championships that year. The next year, they finished second in pairs at the U.S. Championships and fourth at the North American Figure Skating Championships.

They died along with their 33-year-old stepmother and coach, on February 15, 1961, when Sabena Flight 548 crashed in Belgium en route to the World Championships in Prague. She was 18 years old. Her parents met in Eugene, Oregon, and Hadley and her brother are buried in that city.

Her father had intended to fly to Europe on a separate flight the following day. When he learned of the plane crash, he told a reporter he wished that he had been on the doomed flight with his wife and children so they all could have died together. Ray Hadley Sr. died in 1966 of what friends said was a broken heart.

On January 28, 2011, Hadley was inducted into the United States Figure Skating Hall of Fame as part of the 1961 U.S. World Team.

== Results ==
=== Pairs ===
Event	1959	1960	1961
Winter Olympics		11th	
World Championships		12th	
North American Championships			4th
U.S. Championships	4th	3rd	2nd

=== Ice Dance ===
Event	1960	1961
U.S. Championships	2nd J.	2nd J.
