= Dino De Zordo =

Italian ski jumper

Personal information
- Nationality: Italian
- Born: 15 May 1937 (age 87); Cibiana di Cadore, Italy

Sport
- Sport: Ski jumping

Dino De Zordo (born 15 May 1937) is an Italian ski jumper. He competed in the individual event at the 1960 Winter Olympics.
