= Nancy Heiss =

American figure skater

Figure skating career
- Country: United States
Medal record
Representing the United States
Ladies' figure skating
North American Championships
Bronze medal – third place	1959 Toronto	Ladies' singles

Nancy Heiss is a former American figure skater. She was the 1955 U.S. junior champion. At the senior level she placed 4th at the United States Figure Skating Championships in 1957 and 1958, and won the silver medal at the 1959 event. In those three years she also qualified to skate at the World Figure Skating Championships, where she placed 8th, 6th, and 8th, respectively.

Heiss was unable to compete in the 1959-1960 season due to an ankle injury, and enrolled at Michigan State University that fall instead. While she announced an intention to return to competition after recovering from her injury, in the end she chose to concentrate on her studies.

Nancy Heiss is the younger sister of 1960 Olympic Champion Carol Heiss. Their younger brother Bruce Heiss was also an elite competitor. During the 1950s, the skating Heiss siblings were featured in publications such as Life magazine.

Like her sister Carol, Nancy Heiss was coached by Pierre Brunet during her competitive career.

== Results ==
Event	1954	1955	1956	1957	1958	1959
World Championships				8th	6th	8th
North American Championships						3rd
U.S. Championships	5th J.	1st J.	5th	4th	4th	2nd
