= Alwin Plank =

Austrian ski jumper (1931–2019)

Alwin Plank (4 April 1931 – 5 April 2019) was an Austrian ski jumper who competed from 1953 to 1961. He won the 1959-60 Four Hills Tournament event in Bischofshofen. Plank also finished 14th in the ski jumping event at the 1960 Winter Olympics in Squaw Valley. He was born in Hohenems.
