= Arne Larsen (Nordic combined skier) =

Norwegian Nordic combined skier

Medal record

Men's Nordic combined

World Championships
Gold medal – first place	1962 Zakopane	Individual

Arne Kjell Larsen (born 23 December 1937) is a retired Norwegian Nordic combined skier who competed internationally in the early 1960s.

Arne Kjlell Larsen was born in Heggedal, and represented Heggedal IL. Larsen was a baker by occupation, and he was nicknamed "Den glade baker fra Heggedal" ('The Happy Baker from Heggedal') by commentator Bjørge Lillelien. He won the gold in the individual event at the 1962 FIS Nordic World Ski Championships in Zakopane. He also finished sixth at the 1960 Winter Olympics and fifth at the 1964 Winter Olympics. Larsen was awarded the Holmenkollen medal in 1965 (shared with Arto Tiainen and Bengt Eriksson).
