= Nilo Zandanel =

Italian ski jumper

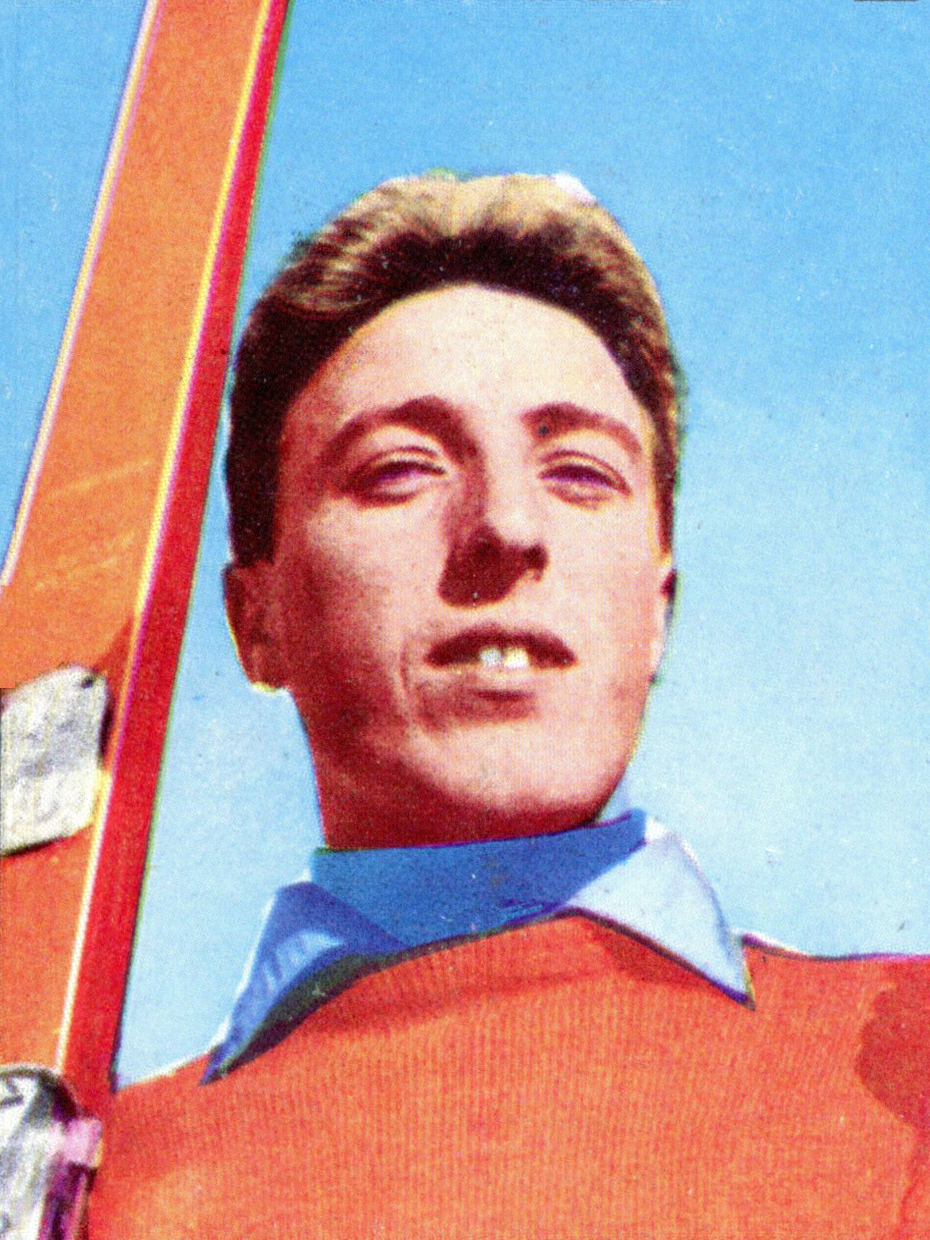
- Nilo Zandanel c. 1966

Personal information
- Nationality: Italy
- Born: 8 November 1937 Cibiana di Cadore, Kingdom of Italy
- Died: 25 July 2015 (aged 77) Pieve di Cadore, Italy
- Height: 1.67 m (5 ft 6 in)

Sport
- Sport: Skiing
- Club: G.S. Fiamme Gialle

Achievements and titles
- Personal bests: 144 m (472 ft); Oberstdorf, West Germany (18 February 1964)

Nilo Zandanel (8 November 1937 – 25 July 2015) was an Italian ski jumper.

== Career ==
He competed at the 1960 and 1964 Winter Olympics in the normal and large hill events with the best achievement of 25th place in the large hill in 1964.

On 16 February 1964, he set the ski jumping world record distance at 144 metres (466 ft) on Heini-Klopfer-Skiflugschanze in Oberstdorf, West Germany.

== Ski jumping world record ==
Date	Hill	Location	Metres	Feet
16 February 1964	Heini-Klopfer-Skiflugschanze	Oberstdorf, West Germany	144	472
