= Juhani Kärkinen =

Finnish ski jumper (1935–2019)

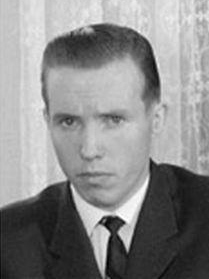
- Juhani Kärkinen, circa 1960

Personal information
- Born: 28 October 1935 Kotka, Finland
- Died: 29 August 2019 (aged 83) Lahti, Finland
- Height: 165 cm (5 ft 5 in)
- Weight: 63 kg (139 lb)

Sport
- Sport: Ski jumping
- Club: Lahden Hiihtoseura, Lahti
Medal record
Representing Finland
World Championships
Gold medal – first place	1958 Lahti	Individual large hill

Juhani Tapio Antero Kärkinen (28 October 1935 – 29 August 2019) was a Finnish ski jumper who won a gold medal in the large hill at the 1958 World Ski Championships. He placed eighth in the normal hill at the 1960 Winter Olympics. His elder brother Kalevi was also an international ski jumper.
