= Eddie Rudolph =

American speed skater

Personal information
- Born: August 31, 1941 Highland Park, Illinois, United States
- Died: July 19, 2009 (aged 67) Boulder, Wyoming, United States

Sport
- Sport: Speed skating

Eddie Rudolph (August 31, 1941 – July 19, 2009) was an American speed skater. He competed at the 1960 Winter Olympics and the 1964 Winter Olympics.
