= Ole Tom Nord =

Norwegian ski jumper (1940–2026)

Personal information
- Nationality: Norwegian
- Born: 27 November 1940 Konsmo, German-occupied Norway
- Died: 8 July 2026 (aged 85) Ål, Norway

Sport
- Sport: Ski jumping

Ole Tom Nord (27 November 1940 – 8 July 2026) was a Norwegian ski jumper. He was born in Konsmo. He competed at the Winter Olympics in 1960, where he placed 23rd. He became Norwegian champion in ski jumping in 1960. Nord died in Ål on 8 July 2026, at the age of 85.
