= Tim Brown (figure skater) =

American figure skater

Personal information
- Full name: Timothy Tuttle Brown
- Born: July 24, 1938 Loup City, Nebraska, U.S.
- Died: September 14, 1989 (aged 51) San Francisco, California, U.S.

Figure skating career
- Country: United States
- Discipline: Men's singles
Medal record
World Championships
Bronze medal – third place	1959 Colorado Springs	Men's singles
Silver medal – second place	1958 Paris	Men's singles
Silver medal – second place	1957 Colorado Springs	Men's singles
North American Championships
Silver medal – second place	1959 Toronto	Men's singles
Bronze medal – third place	1957 Rochester	Men's singles

Timothy Tuttle "Tim" Brown (July 24, 1938 – September 14, 1989) was an American figure skater.

Brown won the gold medal at the U.S. Junior Figure Skating Championships in 1954. As a senior, he came in fourth place two times and won the silver medal four times at U.S. Figure Skating Championships between 1957 and 1960. At the World Figure Skating Championships, he won silver medals in 1957 and 1958, and came in third place in 1959. He also competed at the 1960 Winter Olympics and came in fifth place. In 1961, he earned another berth to the World Championships but did not make the trip due to illness, a move that was fortunate for him, as the entire U.S. Figure Skating team was killed en route to the competition when Sabena Flight 548 crashed near Brussels.

Brown also competed in ice dance, winning the bronze at the 1958 U.S. Nationals with partner Susan Sebo. He died of AIDS in 1989.

== Results ==
=== Men's singles ===
Event	1953	1954	1955	1956	1957	1958	1959	1960	1961
Winter Olympic Games								5th	
World Championships					2nd	2nd	3rd		
North American Championships					3rd		2nd		
U.S. Championships	3rd J	1st J	4th	4th	2nd	2nd	2nd	2nd	3rd

=== Ice dancing ===
(with Sebo)

Event	1957	1958	1959
U.S. Championships	6th	3rd	4th
