= Ansten Samuelstuen =

American ski jumper (1929–2012)

Ansten Samuelstuen (May 7, 1929 – August 18, 2012) was a Norwegian-born American ski jumper who competed in the early 1960s.

== Life and career ==
Ansten Samuelstuen was born in the Brøttum Church parish in Ringsaker Municipality in Hedmark county, Norway. After immigrating to the United States in 1954, he won three national titles in ski jumping, (1957, 1961 and 1962) and held four North American titles (1954, 1955, 1957 and 1964). He became a U.S. citizen in 1957.

Samuelstuen finished seventh in the individual large hill event at the 1960 Winter Olympics in Squaw Valley. His best career finish was 34th in an individual normal hill event in West Germany in 1963. He also competed in the 1964 Winter Olympics.

== Death ==
Samuelstuen died in Greeley, Colorado on August 18, 2012, at the age of 83.

== Legacy ==
In 2009, he was entered into the National Ski Hall of Fame of the United States.
