= Kjell Sjöberg =

Swedish ski jumper

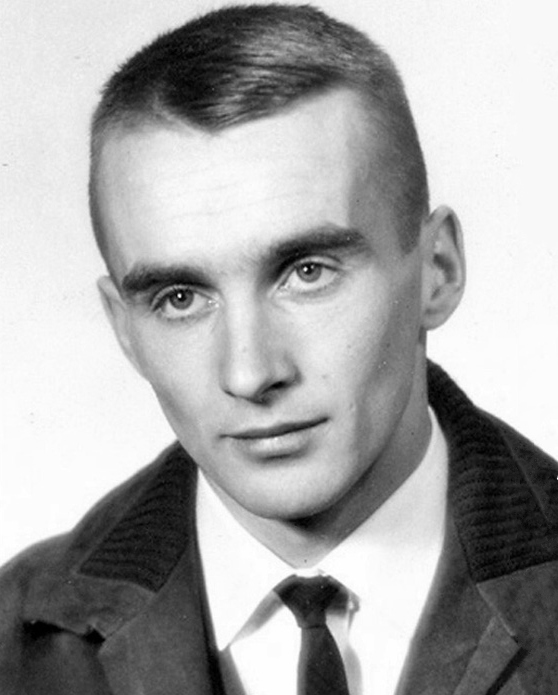
- Kjell Sjöberg between 1960 and 1968

Personal information
- Nationality: Sweden
- Born: 11 May 1937 Själevad, Sweden
- Died: 10 September 2013 (aged 76) Örnsköldsvik, Sweden
- Height: 169 cm (5 ft 7 in)

Sport
- Sport: Skiing
- Club: IF Friska Viljor

Achievements and titles
- Personal bests: 148 m (486 ft); Oberstdorf, West Germany (10 February 1967)
Medal record
World Championships
Bronze medal – third place	1966 Oslo	Individual LH

Kjell Allan Sjöberg (11 May 1937 – 10 September 2013) was a Swedish ski jumper.

== Career ==
He competed at the 1960, 1964 and 1968 Olympics in the normal hill and large hill events with the best result of fifth place in the large hill in 1964.

He set two world records, 141 metres (464 ft) in 1964 and 148 metres (486 ft) in 1967, both on Heini-Klopfer-Skiflugschanze ski flying hill in Oberstdorf, West Germany.

He won a bronze medal in that event at the 1966 FIS Nordic World Ski Championships in Oslo.

After retiring from competitions Sjöberg worked in the paint and paper production industries. He died aged 76 and was survived by wife Astrid, daughter Marie, two brothers and a sister.

== Ski jumping world records ==
Date	Hill	Location	Metres	Feet
15 February 1964	Heini-Klopfer-Skiflugschanze	Oberstdorf, West Germany	141	464
10 February 1967	Heini-Klopfer-Skiflugschanze	Oberstdorf, West Germany	148	486
