= Jacques Charland =

Canadian ski jumper

Jacques Charland (April 10, 1930 – October 12, 2013) was a Canadian ski jumper who competed from 1952 to 1960. His best finish at the Winter Olympics was 25th in the individual large hill event at Oslo in 1952. He was born in Trois-Rivières, Quebec. Charland's best career finish was sixth in an individual large hill event in Austria in 1960.
