= Robert Rey (ski jumper) =

French ski jumper

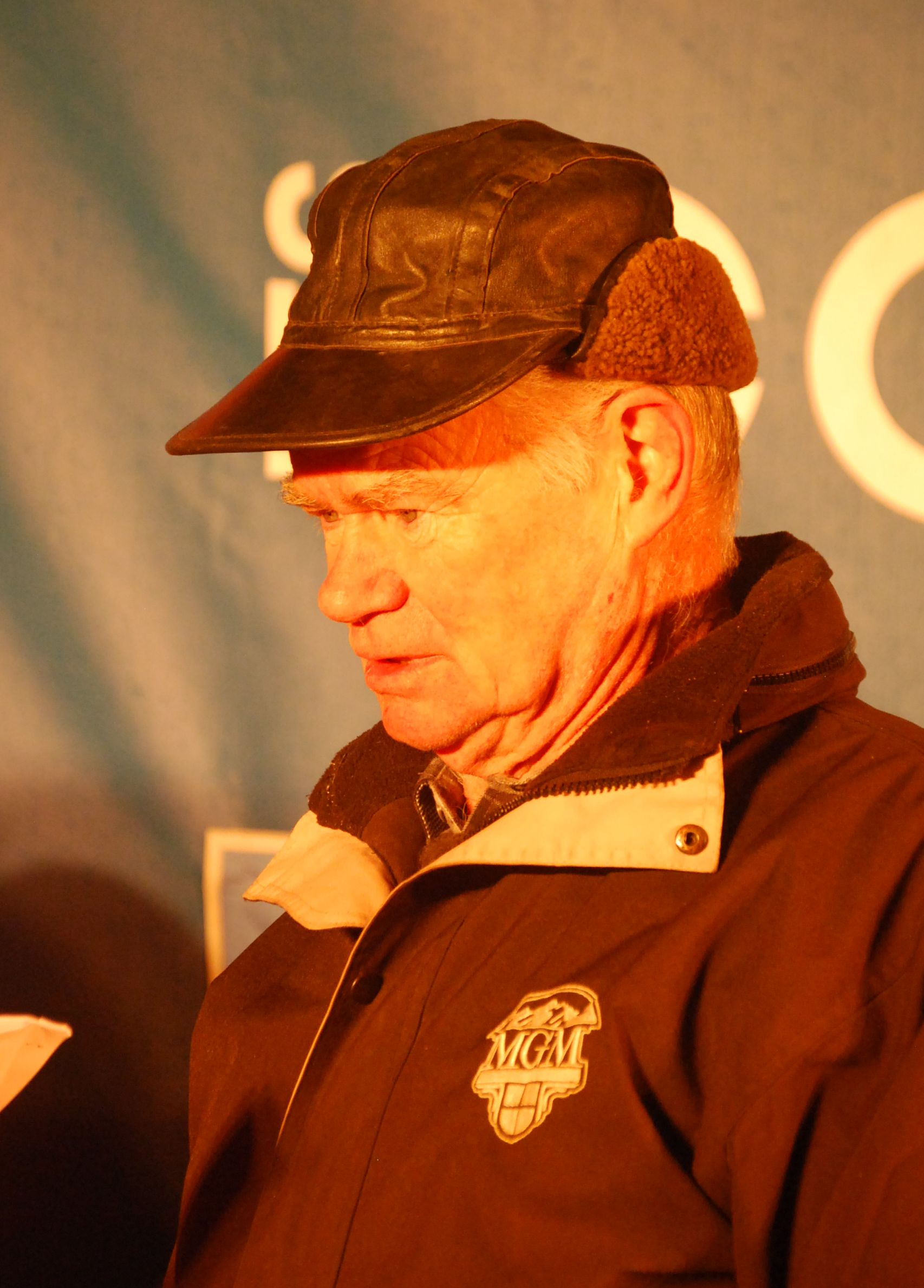
- Robert Rey in 2014

Personal information
- Born: March 25, 1934 (age 92)

Sport
- Country: France
- Sport: Ski jumping

Robert Rey (born March 25, 1934) is a French ski jumper who competed in the 1950s and the 1960s and was part of the French National Team from 1959 to 1962. He is a younger brother of Régis Rey.
