= Robert Brewer (figure skater) =

American figure skater (born 1939)

Personal information
- Full name: Robert Lee Brewer
- Born: March 1, 1939 (age 87) Alhambra, California, U.S.

Figure skating career
- Country: United States
- Discipline: Men's singles
- Skating club: Los Angeles Figure Skating Club
- Retired: 1960
Medal record
North American Championships
Bronze medal – third place	1959 Toronto	Men's singles

Robert Lee Brewer (born March 1, 1939) is an American former figure skater. He is a two-time U.S. national bronze medalist (1959, 1960) and competed at the 1960 Winter Olympics, placing seventh. After retiring from competition, he became a Marine fighter pilot, flight surgeon, and a psychiatrist.

== Competitive highlights ==
International
Event	1955	1956	1957	1958	1959	1960
Winter Olympic Games						7th
World Championships			8th	10th	11th	
North American Championships					3rd	
National
U.S. Championships	2nd J	1st J	4th	4th	3rd	3rd
