= Gene Kotlarek =

American ski jumper (1940–2017)

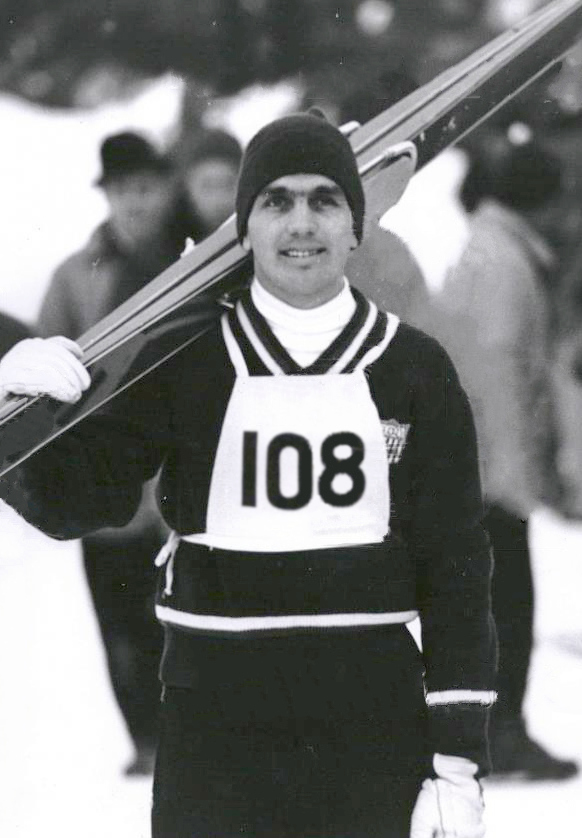
- Kotlarek in 1963

Personal information
- Born: March 31, 1940 Duluth, Minnesota, U.S.
- Died: November 9, 2017 (aged 77) Colorado Springs, Colorado, U.S.
- Height: 175 cm (5 ft 9 in)
- Weight: 71 kg (157 lb)

Sport
- Sport: Ski Jumping
- Club: Duluth XC Ski Club
- Coached by: George Kotlarek

Eugene Robert "Gene" Kotlarek (March 31, 1940 – November 9, 2017) was an American former ski jumper. He competed at the 1960 and 1964 Winter Olympics with the best result of 14th place in the normal hill in 1964.

== Biography ==
Kotlarek was trained by his father George, a member of the American Ski Jumping Hall of Fame. He won the 1958 National Boys title, the 1959 National Junior A championship, and the U.S. Senior titles in 1963 and 1966–67. In 1964, he set a national record at 138 m (454 feet), which stood for nine years. Kotlarek graduated from the University of Minnesota and later worked as an accountant. In 1982, he was elected to the National Ski Hall of Fame.

Kotlarek died on November 9, 2017, in Colorado Springs, Colorado.
