= February 1961 =

Month of 1961

<<	February 1961					>>
Su	Mo	Tu	We	Th	Fr	Sa
			1	2	3	4
5	6	7	8	9	10	11
12	13	14	15	16	17	18
19	20	21	22	23	24	25
26	27	28

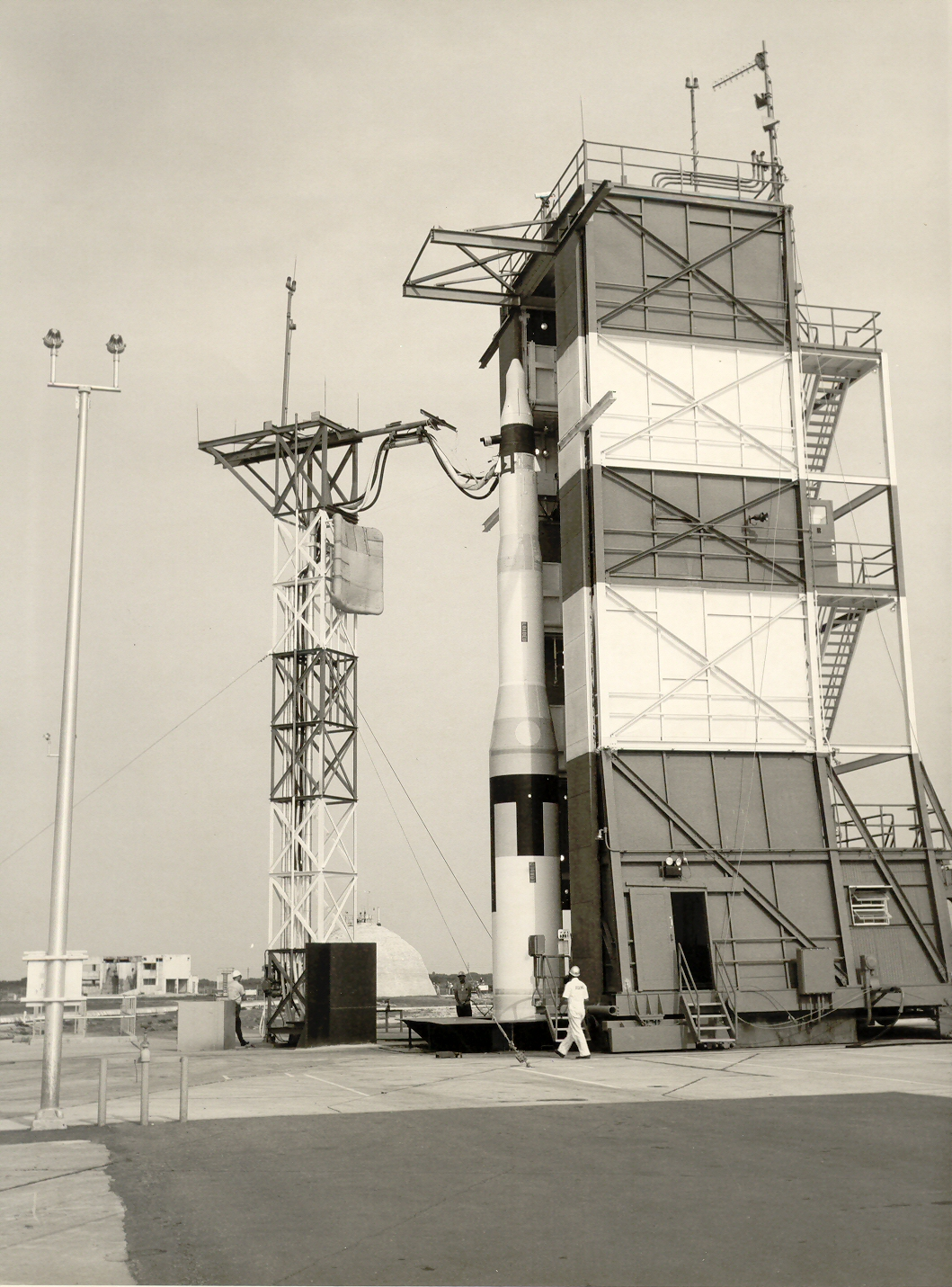
February 1, 1961: U.S. launches first Minuteman ICBM

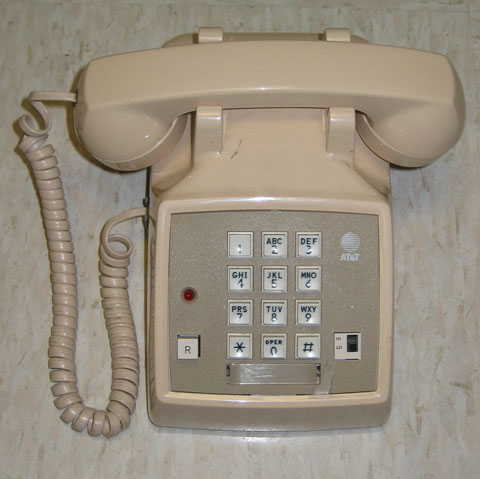
February 1, 1961: Touch-tone phone tested by Bell

February 14, 1961: New element created

The following events occurred in February 1961:

== February 1, 1961 (Wednesday) ==
- The United States launched its first test of the Minuteman I intercontinental ballistic missile. The rocket lifted off from Cape Canaveral at 11:00 a.m. and traveled 4,000 miles (6,400 km) in less than 15 minutes to a target in the Atlantic Ocean.
- The push-button telephone was put into public service for the first time, as Bell Telephone test marketed its "Touch-Tone" service for its customers in the cities of Carnegie, Pennsylvania and Findlay, Ohio.
- The Misfits, directed by John Huston, was released to theaters in the United States. The film would end up being the last for its two leading stars, Clark Gable and Marilyn Monroe.
- Moore Air Base became inactive, along with the 78th Fighter Group of the U.S. Air Force.
- Born: Carmen Colón, first victim of the Alphabet murders (d. 1971); in Puerto Rico

== February 2, 1961 (Thursday) ==
- At Wailuku, Hawaii, Stanley Ann Dunham, an 18-year-old student at the University of Hawaii, married Barack Obama, Sr., a 25-year-old graduate student from Kenya. Six months later, their son, Barack Obama, who would become the 44th President of the United States, was born in Honolulu.
- After ten days of being held captive on a hijacked ocean liner, the nearly 600 passengers from the cruise ship Santa Maria were freed, and were taken ashore by various boats to the Brazilian port of Recife.
- Betty Curtis won the Sanremo Music Festival with the song "Al di là".
- Born: Michael Kay, American sports broadcaster; in New York City
- Died: Victor Danielsen, 66, Faroese translator and missionary

== February 3, 1961 (Friday) ==
- Operation Looking Glass began, as the first of a series of Boeing EC-135 jets went into the air on orders of the Strategic Air Command. For more than 30 years, an EC-135 was always in the air, with the capability of taking direct control of the United States' bombers and missiles in the event of the destruction of the SAC's command post near Omaha. As one jet "Doomsday Plane" was preparing to land, another was already aloft. The program continued, with E4A jets later replacing the EC-135s, until the fall of the Soviet Union.
- Garuda Indonesian Airways Flight 542 and its 26 occupants disappeared while flying from Surabaya on the island of Java, to Balikpapan on the island of Borneo. The Douglas DC-3 plane plunged into the Java Sea after having last been seen over Madura Island.
- French interior designer Stéphane Boudin made his first visit to the White House, to plan the refurnishing of the U.S. President's residence at the request of the new First Lady, Jacqueline Kennedy.
- Died:
  - William Morrison, 1st Viscount Dunrossil, 67, Governor-General of Australia since 1960, former Speaker of the House of Commons in the United Kingdom (1951–1959) and former British governmental minister.
  - Anna May Wong, 56, Chinese-American movie star

== February 4, 1961 (Saturday) ==
- The Portuguese Colonial War began in Angola with a co-ordinated attack by 180 MPLA guerillas in Luanda. In a morning raid, armed groups attacked the prison, the police barracks, a police patrol and the radio station. The attacks failed, and armed white Angolan residents exacted revenge on Luanda's black neighborhoods, but the battle inspired a 14-year-long campaign to liberate Portugal's colonies.
- Sputnik 7 was launched by the Soviet Union and placed into Earth orbit. Although reported as a success, in that it was the heaviest object (14,300 pounds (6,500 kg)) into orbit at that time, the Soviets did not mention that their intent had been to send the first Earth craft to the planet Venus, a detail revealed in 1962 by the American space agency, NASA.
- Died: Alphonse Picou, 82, American jazz clarinetist

== February 5, 1961 (Sunday) ==
- Movie actress Marilyn Monroe voluntarily checked herself into the Cornell University Medical Center (under the pseudonym "Faye Miller") after being driven there by her psychiatrist, Marianne Kris. Admitted on the premise that she would be treated for exhaustion, Monroe was instead taken to the Payne Whitney Psychiatric Clinic and found "the worst fear of her life come true", being locked inside a padded cell. After three days, she was permitted to make a phone call and reached her ex-husband, baseball star Joe DiMaggio, who flew to New York City and effected her release.
- The Kachin Independence Organisation and its military wing, the Kachin Independence Army, were organized in the northernmost state of Burma, where the predominantly Christian Kachin people revolted against a proposal by Burmese Premier U Nu to make Buddhism the national religion. Led by the three Zau brothers (Zau Seng, Zau Tu and Zau Dan), the KIO and the KIA lead a rebellion that would last for 32 years, during which the Kachin state operated independently from the rest of Burma.
- A plebiscite was held on the south Pacific islands of Saipan and Tinian on the issue of the future political status of the two southern Pacific lands, both of which were administered by the U.S. Navy. Most (1,642 voters) favored rejoining the U.S. territory of Guam, 875 wanted to be a territory within the Northern Marianas, 27 wanted to continue under Navy administration, and eight were invalid.

== February 6, 1961 (Monday) ==
- In what the Associated Press described as "a rarity in anti-trust cases", seven corporate executives were sent to jail in Philadelphia for bid rigging in attempting to obtain government contracts. The jail sentences were in addition to fines against 29 different electrical firms, and another 19 officials were given probation and suspended sentences. The men who drew 30-day jail sentences were a vice-president and two former division managers of General Electric Company; a vice-president and a sales manager of Westinghouse Electric Company; a V.P. of Cutler-Hammer, Inc. (later part of Eaton Corporation) and a V.P. of Clark Controller Company. U.S. District Judge J. Cullen Ganey said, "What really is at stake here is a vast section of our economic system that we are offering to uncommitted sections of the world as an alternative to planned economies."
- General Ne Win of the Burmese Army purged his military command, announcing the forced resignations of Brigadier General (and future president) Maung Maung, his director of military training, and nine of his 18 field commanders.
- In the Congo, President Joseph Kasavubu named Joseph Ileo as the Prime Minister in an interim government. Ileo was unable to persuade major secessionist leaders to join his cabinet and would resign on August 1.
- KOPB-TV began operating in Portland, Oregon, under the name KOAP.
- Born: Yury Onufriyenko, Russian cosmonaut; in Ryasne, Ukrainian SSR, Soviet Union

== February 7, 1961 (Tuesday) ==
- Black political leaders, including Joshua Nkomo and Ndabaningi Sithole, met with British colonial officials in Salisbury and signed their agreement to a referendum on a proposed constitution for independence for Southern Rhodesia, with a system providing for gradual rule by the black African majority. The document, which was to be submitted to black and white voters on July 26, had provisions for "a complicated, racially discriminatory voting system" with an "A" roll for white African voters and candidates, and a "B" roll for black voters and candidates. "It is possible," an author would later write, "had Nkomo adhered to this commitment that he could have found himself in reasonable time the President of the independent state of Zimbabwe. If he had stood by his commitment, the armed struggle, to which he would commit himself shortly, and which would kill some 40,000 people in 1962 to 1980, would not have occurred. If he had stayed in the constitutional process and encouraged the Africans to qualify for the vote, they would have... by dint of their numbers, come to dominate in a lawful, peaceful manner." Days after the initial agreement, Nkomo and Sithole withdrew their support and urged their supporters to boycott the referendum.
- Harold Johnson defeated Jess Bowdry in a boxing bout to win recognition by the National Boxing Association as world light heavyweight champion. All other boxing boards continued to recognize Archie Moore (who had beaten Johnson in four previous encounters) as the world champion, but the N.B.A. had vacated Moore's title for inactivity.
- George Low, NASA's Chief of Manned Space Flight, and his task group submitted their report, A Plan for a Manned Lunar Landing, for consideration by U.S. president John F. Kennedy.
- Born: Prince François, Count of Clermont, dauphin of the Orleanist claimant to the French throne (d. 2017); in Boulogne-Billancourt

== February 8, 1961 (Wednesday) ==
- At a press conference to announce that Prime Minister John Diefenbaker of Canada would be coming to the United States on February 20, President Kennedy mispronounced the Canadian leader's name multiple times. Kennedy had asked Secretary of State Dean Rusk, who in turn had asked Assistant for European Affairs Foy D. Kohler, who suggested the German pronunciation "Dee-fen-bawk-er"; Diefenbaker's name was misspelled by various news sources as "Diffenbaker", "Diefenbacker", "Diefenbacon" and even (by UPI) "Fifenbaker". Privately, the Prime Minister, whose name was pronounced "Dee-fen-bay-ker", was enraged at what he viewed as being mocked by the American president.
- Born: Vince Neil (stage name for Vincent Neil Wharton), American musician and lead vocalist of heavy metal band Mötley Crüe; in Los Angeles

== February 9, 1961 (Thursday) ==
- Three Vautour fighter jets of the French Air Force attacked an Il-18 plane that was carrying Leonid Brezhnev, who at the time was the ceremonial head of state of the Soviet Union and was on his way to the Republic of Guinea for a state visit. When Brezhnev's plane strayed into the airspace of French Algeria, it was intercepted by the three fighters, one of which fired bursts of tracer bullets and forced Brezhnev's plane to make an emergency landing in Morocco. The French Foreign Ministry apologized the next day.
- The Beatles, consisting at the time of John Lennon, Paul McCartney, George Harrison and Pete Best, returned to The Cavern Club in Liverpool for the first time since they had adopted their new name and since adding George Harrison. The band, which had been performing at The Cavern Club since 1957 as "The Quarrymen", had changed to "The Beatles" in 1960 while in Hamburg, George Harrison's first appearance at the venue.
- Born: John Kruk, American baseball player; in Charleston, West Virginia
- Died: Millard Tydings, 70, U.S. Senator for Maryland from 1927 to 1951

== February 10, 1961 (Friday) ==
- The Robert Moses Niagara Hydroelectric Power Station went online, completing a project to use Niagara Falls to generate electricity from what was, at the time, the largest hydroelectric power plant in the world, generating 2,400,000 million kilowatts (or 2.4 gigawatts) of electricity per hour.
- Artist Oskar Kokoschka was made an honorary citizen of Vienna.
- Born: George Stephanopoulos, American presidential adviser to President Bill Clinton, later and television journalist and anchor for ABC News and Good Morning America; in Fall River, Massachusetts

== February 11, 1961 (Saturday) ==
- Robert C. Weaver became the first African-American to lead a major U.S. government agency, becoming Administrator of the Housing and Home Finance Agency on appointment by President Kennedy. When the HHFA was raised to cabinet-level status on January 18, 1966, Weaver became the first African-American cabinet member, under President Lyndon Johnson, as the first U.S. Secretary of Housing and Urban Development.
- A plebiscite was conducted in the north and south parts of the British Cameroons over whether to join the Federation of Nigeria or the Republic of Cameroon that had recently become independent of France. Residents of the Southern Cameroons voted 233,571 to 97,741 in favor of union with Cameroon, while in the Northern Cameroons, the result was 146,296 to 97,659 in favor of integration with Nigeria.
- Melbourne Cricket Ground had its largest ever crowd for a cricket match, 90,800 people, attending the test match between Australia and the West Indies.
- Died: Kate Carew, 91, American caricaturist

== February 12, 1961 (Sunday) ==
- Eight days after launching the seven-ton Sputnik 5, the USSR used the orbiting satellite as a launch platform from which to fire a rocket carrying the interplanetary space probe, Venera 1, towards the planet Venus. The U.S. had launched Pioneer V toward Venus in March. Contact with the satellite was lost after it traveled 4,650,000 miles (7,480,000 km), but the probe came within 62,000 miles (100,000 km) of the second planet, and is believed to still be in orbit around the Sun.
- Born: David Graeber, American anthropologist and anarchism activist (d. 2020); in New York City

== February 13, 1961 (Monday) ==
- At Elisabethville, The Congo, Katangan Interior Minister Godefroid Munongo informed reporters, "I have called you together to announce the death of Patrice Lumumba and his accomplices," then went on to say that the group had been massacred the day before "by the inhabitants of a little village" days after escaping from prison. As it turned out, Lumumba had been executed by a Katangan firing squad a month earlier, on January 17. The confirmation of Lumumba's death stirred rioting in the Congo and around the world.
- NASA and McDonnell began discussions of an advanced Mercury spacecraft that could be made maneuverable in space, after Space Task Group (STG) Director Robert R. Gilruth assigned James A. Chamberlin, Chief, STG Engineering Division, to institute studies with McDonnell on improving Mercury for future programs. Work on several versions of the spacecraft, ranging from minor modifications to radical redesign, got underway immediately and would lead a month later to proposals for a two-man version of the improved Mercury, a necessity for extravehicular operations, and the beginning of designing by McDonnell of what would become the Gemini spacecraft.
- Hunting for geodes in the Coso Mountains near Olancha, California, rock collectors Wally Lane, Mike Mikesell and Virginia Maxey found a 500,000-year-old rock containing the "Coso artifact", a metal object that resembled, anachronistically, a spark plug. The rock and the ancient spark plug have not been seen since 1969.

== February 14, 1961 (Tuesday) ==
- A day after the news of Patrice Lumumba's death, thousands of protesters attacked Belgium's embassies worldwide. The embassy in Moscow was attacked by a mob of thousands of Russian, Asian and African students, while the one in Belgrade was ransacked following a protest by 30,000 people. African students in New Delhi wrecked furniture at the embassy there. The next day, a group of 24 protesters fought with guards at the United Nations Security Council. One reporter felt that the Moscow riots, with marchers from that city's People's Friendship University, "showed signs of careful planning" and that it had been orchestrated by the Soviet government.
- Element 103, Lawrencium, was first synthesized by a team of scientists at the University of California, Berkeley. Using the cyclotron at the Lawrence Radiation Laboratory, scientists Albert Ghiorso, Torbjorn Sikkeland, Almon E. Larsh and Robert M. Latimer bombarded Californium with Boron-10 and Boron-11 nuclei, combining the protons of the 98th and 5th elements to create a new element with 103 protons. After spending two months confirming their finding, the team made their announcement on April 13.
- The Zuid-Afrikaanse Rand (ZAR) became the official currency of South Africa, replacing the South African pound at a 2:1 ratio.
- James E. Webb took office as administrator of NASA, serving until 1968.

== February 15, 1961 (Wednesday) ==
- Sabena Flight 548 crashed as it was approaching Brussels on a flight from New York City, killing all 72 people on board, including all of the United States figure skating team and its coaches. It was the first fatal crash of a Boeing 707 passenger jet.
- Died in the crash of Sabena Flight 548:
  - Dona Lee Carrier, 20, and her ice dance partner Roger Campbell, 19
  - Patricia Dineen, 25, and her husband and ice dance partner Robert Dineen, 25
  - Ray Hadley, Jr., 17, and his sister Ila Ray Hadley, 18, ice dance competitors
  - Harold Hartshorne, 69, skating judge and former ice dancer
  - Laurie Hickox, 15, and her brother and pairs partner William Hickox, 19
  - Gregory Kelley, 16, U.S. junior men's singles champion
  - Edward LeMaire, skating judge, and his 14-year-old son
  - Bradley Lord, 21, U.S. men's singles champion
  - Rhode Lee Michelson, 17, ladies' singles competitor
  - Laurence Owen, 16, U.S. national ladies' singles champion
  - Maribel Owen, 20, and Dudley Richards, 29, U.S. national pairs champions
  - Douglas Ramsay, 16, men's singles competitor
  - Edi Scholdan, Austrian figure skater and coach, and his 13-year-old son
  - Diane Sherbloom, 18, and her ice dance partner Larry Pierce, 24
  - Maribel Vinson, 49, nine-time U.S. national figure skating champion, and her two daughters
  - Stephanie Westerfeld, 17, ladies' singles competitor
- A total solar eclipse was visible in parts of the Northern Hemisphere from France to the Soviet Union, with the Black Sea port of Rostov-on-Don being the midpoint of greatest eclipse.
- President John F. Kennedy warned the Soviet Union to avoid interfering with the United Nations pacification of the Congo.
- Died: William F. Norrell, 64, U.S. representative from Arkansas who had been sworn in for his 11th term six weeks earlier, died two days after having a stroke while sitting in his office at the U.S. Capitol.

== February 16, 1961 (Thursday) ==
- The Congress of Confédération Africaine de Football delegates took place in Cairo.
- The Sunday Lake mine at Wakefield, Michigan, closed.
- Cyprus's first nationality law was enacted.

== February 17, 1961 (Friday) ==
- The first specimen of a human coronavirus was collected from an unidentified English schoolboy at a boarding school in Epsom, Surrey. Designated "B814" and considered a highly contagious version of the common cold, the B814 strain was preserved for future study and determined by Dr. David Tyrell and Dr. Malcolm L. Bynoe to be "a virus virtually unrelated to any other known virus of the human respiratory tract." Further examination of the sample would determine that B814 was the first coronavirus to infect human beings.
- NASA's Space Task Group selected the flight trajectory for the Mercury-Atlas 2 mission, to avoid the most severe reentry heating conditions which could be encountered on an emergency abort during an orbital flight attempt. The reentry heating rate was estimated to be 30% higher than a normal Mercury orbital reentry, and temperatures were predicted to be about 25% higher at certain locations on the afterbody of the spacecraft. The deceleration g-load was calculated to be about twice that expected for a normal reentry from orbit. A different group discussed escape hatch procedures for recovery force operations, with suggestions for the installation of a pull-ring for activating the hatch explosive charge, and for a paint outline of an emergency outlet that could be cut through, if necessary.
- Born:
  - Angela and Maria Eagle, British members of the House of Commons and officials within the Shadow Cabinet that advises the Leader of the Opposition; in Bridlington, East Riding of Yorkshire
  - Meir Kessler, Israeli rabbi; in Bnei Brak
- Died: Nita Naldi, 66, American silent film star

== February 18, 1961 (Saturday) ==
- Led by British author and activist Bertrand Russell, the Committee of 100 and a crowd of 5,000 people staged a sit-down protest at the Ministry of Defence in Whitehall, London, demanding that the UK call off its agreement to bring nuclear missiles to the British Isles. As one author notes, "Somewhat to the distress of Russell... police took no action on this occasion."
- The remains of the former USS South Dakota, a U.S. Navy armored cruiser during World War One and later renamed the USS Huron before being sold for scrap in 1930, sank off the coast of the city of Powell River, British Columbia. A storm caused the stripped-down ship to go down in 80-foot (24 m) deep waters in the Salish Sea coastal waterway.
- Kwame Nkrumah laid the foundation stone of the Kwame Nkrumah Ideological Institute in Winneba, Ghana.
- After 22 years of publication, the British comic strip Radio Fun was merged into Buster.

== February 19, 1961 (Sunday) ==
- A seven-year-old boy in Arizona survived a 275-foot (84 m) fall into an irrigation well and was rescued after ranch employees tied together multiple ropes. Harry Stage had broken both legs and his pelvis after falling through the 16-inch (410 mm) pipe.
- Belgium's King Baudouin dissolved Parliament and ordered new elections to be conducted on March 26.
- Born: Justin Fashanu, English footballer (d. 1998); in Hackney, London

== February 20, 1961 (Monday) ==
- Jerry Garcia, an 18-year-old drifter who had been discharged from the U.S. Army, survived a car accident in Palo Alto, California. He would later describe the event as "the slingshot for the rest of my life". "Before then I was always living at less than capacity," he would write later. "Then I got serious." Garcia would go on to found the Grateful Dead in 1965.
- Born: Imogen Stubbs, British actress; in Rothbury, Northumberland
- Died:
  - Romany Marie, 75, American restaurateur and bohemian personality
  - Percy Grainger, 78, Australian composer

== February 21, 1961 (Tuesday) ==
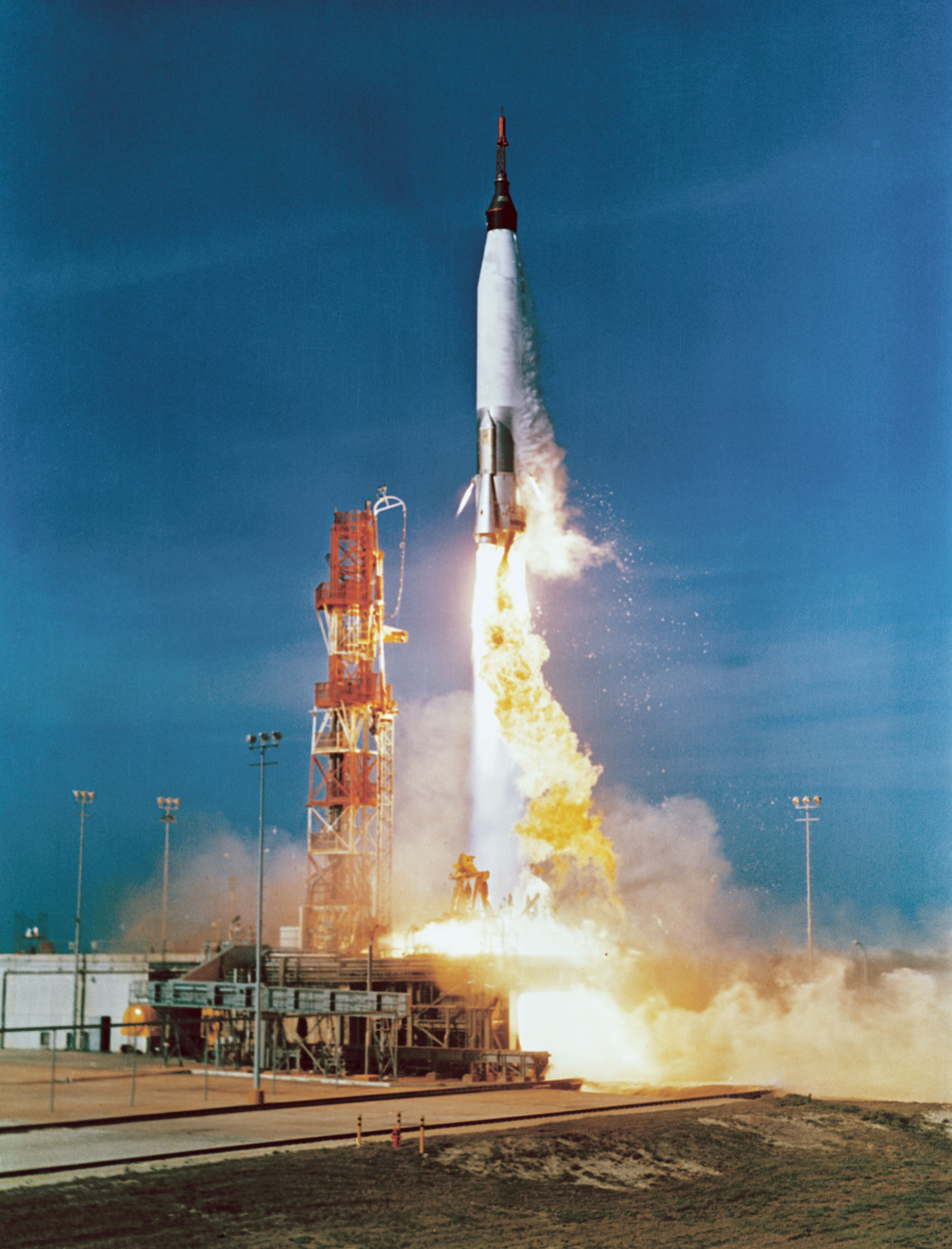
February 21, 1961: Launch of Mercury-Atlas 2

- The uncrewed Mercury-Atlas 2 rocket was launched from Cape Canaveral in a test to check maximum heating and its effects during the worst reentry design conditions. The flight closely matched the desired trajectory and attained a maximum altitude of 114.04 statute miles and a range of 1,431.6 statute miles. Inspection of the spacecraft aboard the recovery ship some 55 minutes after launch (actual flight time was 17.56 minutes) indicated that test objectives were met, since the structure and heat protection elements appeared to be in excellent condition. The flight control team obtained satisfactory data; and the complete launch computing and display system, operating for the first time in a flight, performed satisfactorily.
- United Nations Security Council Resolution 161 was adopted by a 9–0 vote, authorizing United Nation forces to take "all appropriate measures to prevent the occurrence of civil war in the Congo, including... the use of force, if necessary, as a last resort".
- Mercury astronauts John Glenn, Virgil Grissom, and Alan Shepard were selected by the Space Task Group to begin special training for the first crewed Mercury flight.
- The African state of Gabon adopted a new constitution. Léon M'ba became President, with significant additional powers.
- Born: Rhonda Sing, Canadian wrestler; in Calgary (died of a heart attack, 2001)
- Died: Frederick M. Jones, 68, African-American inventor specializing in refrigeration technology and co-founder of Thermo King Corporation

== February 22, 1961 (Wednesday) ==
- Fans of the television soap opera The Edge of Night were horrified when Sara Lane Karr, the show's leading female character, died of injuries sustained on the Monday episode. After CBS received multiple calls from distressed viewers, the actress who played the role, Teal Ames, appeared as herself the next day to explain that she was alive, and that her character had been written out of the series at her own request.
- Come Blow Your Horn, the first play written by Neil Simon, made its debut at the Brooks Atkinson Theatre on Broadway. Running for 677 performances, the play was the first in a string of hits for Simon.
- Born: Jean-Christophe Novelli, French celebrity chef; in Arras
- Died: Nick LaRocca, 71, Jazz cornettist

== February 23, 1961 (Thursday) ==
- Duncan Carse was dropped off alone at the British Antarctic island of South Georgia, for an eighteen-month attempt to become a latter-day Robinson Crusoe. HMS Owen (K640) brought him to the uninhabited south side of the island with 12 tonnes (12 long tons; 13 short tons) of supplies and a prefabricated hut, at Ducloz Head. The hut and much of the supplies would be swept away by a wave on May 20, forcing Carse to survive on what he had been able to save. He would finally be able to signal a ship, the Petrel, on September 13.
- The Space Task Group, Convair-Astronautics, Space Technology Laboratories, McDonnell, and the Marshall Space Flight Center completed extensive studies on the safe separation of the Mercury spacecraft from the launch vehicle during an emergency.
- Geoffrey Charles Lawrence became acting Chief Minister of Zanzibar, which was still under British administration.
- Born: Trent Lehman, American child actor known for Nanny and the Professor, and whose death was an impetus for the founding of the child actor support group A Minor Consideration; in Los Angeles (committed suicide, 1982)

== February 24, 1961 (Friday) ==
- The bodies of former Hungarian prime minister Imre Nagy, Colonel Pál Maléter and journalist Miklós Gimes - all of whom had been executed for treason on June 16, 1958, after the failure of the 1956 Hungarian revolution - were exhumed from the courtyard of the prison where they had been hanged, taken from their coffins, rolled up in tar paper, and buried in an unmarked grave in Budapest. Even their names were altered in cemetery records, with Nagy identified as a woman named Piroska Borbiro. After the downfall of Communism in Hungary in 1989, the three bodies were exhumed, and buried with full honors on June 16, 1989, thirty-one years after their executions.
- Spacecraft No. 9 was delivered to Cape Canaveral for the Mercury-Atlas 5 orbital mission that would be used to launch the chimpanzee (Enos) into space.
- Iranian Airways and Pars Airways merged to form a single national airline for the nation, Iran Air.

== February 25, 1961 (Saturday) ==
- India's Orissa state was placed under president's rule after Chief Minister Harekrushna Mahatab resigned because of non-cooperation among the state's political parties. Direct rule continued for 14 months until new state legislature elections could be held.
- Paul Bikle set a record for altitude for a sailplane, reaching 46,266 feet (14,102 meters) after catching a Sierra Wave in the skies near California's Mount Whitney. The record would remain unbroken more than 50 years later.
- The syndicated claymation television show Davey and Goliath, a project of the United Lutheran Church in America, was first broadcast in the U.S.

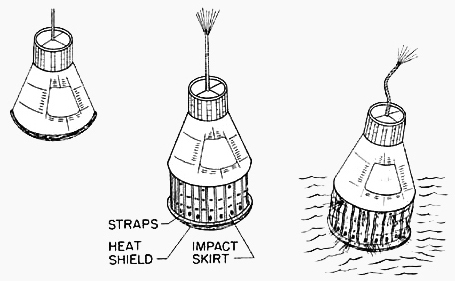
Mercury spacecraft impact attenuation

- McDonnell Corporation conducted a successful drop test, using a boilerplate Mercury spacecraft fitted with impact skirt, straps and cables, and a beryllium heat shield. During the tests the stainless steel straps were successfully stretched to design limits.
- The last public trams in Sydney, Australia, ceased operation, bringing to an end the Southern Hemisphere's largest tramway network.
- Born: Davey Allison, American NASCAR driver; in Hollywood, Florida (killed in helicopter crash, 1993)

== February 26, 1961 (Sunday) ==
- Tyazhely Sputnik (literally "heavy satellite"), at seven tons the largest object to be launched into outer space when it went up on February 4, reentered the atmosphere over Siberia. The failure of the mission was disguised as a test by Soviet authorities.
- Died: King Mohammed V of Morocco, 51, suffered a fatal heart attack after undergoing a minor operation at the clinic in his palace at Rabat. His son, Hassan II was proclaimed his successor.

== February 27, 1961 (Monday) ==
- Professor Henry Kissinger of Harvard University was appointed by U.S. President Kennedy as a consultant to the National Security Agency. The 37-year-old Kissinger, who would later serve as U.S. Secretary of State for two Republican presidents, Richard Nixon and Gerald Ford, had been the author of the 1958 book Nuclear Weapons and Foreign Policy.
- The first congress of the Spanish Trade Union Organisation (OSE) opened.
- The Roman Catholic Diocese of Tula was created.

== February 28, 1961 (Tuesday) ==
- East Germany abruptly ended its program of researching, designing and building aircraft, with the passage of a resolution by the Central Committee of the ruling SED Party. "Huge resources were wasted as a result of this about-face," noted one commentator.
- Under United States law, 38 U.S.C. §101 (29)(A), the Vietnam Era refers to "The period beginning on February 28, 1961, and ending on May 7, 1975, in the case of a veteran who served in the Republic of Vietnam during that period."
- The Saarlouis electric tramway closed after nearly 48 years in operation.
- Born: Mark Ferguson, New Zealand actor and TV presenter; in Sydney, Australia
