= December 1960 =

Month of 1960

<<	December 1960					>>
Su	Mo	Tu	We	Th	Fr	Sa
				1	2	3
4	5	6	7	8	9	10
11	12	13	14	15	16	17
18	19	20	21	22	23	24
25	26	27	28	29	30	31

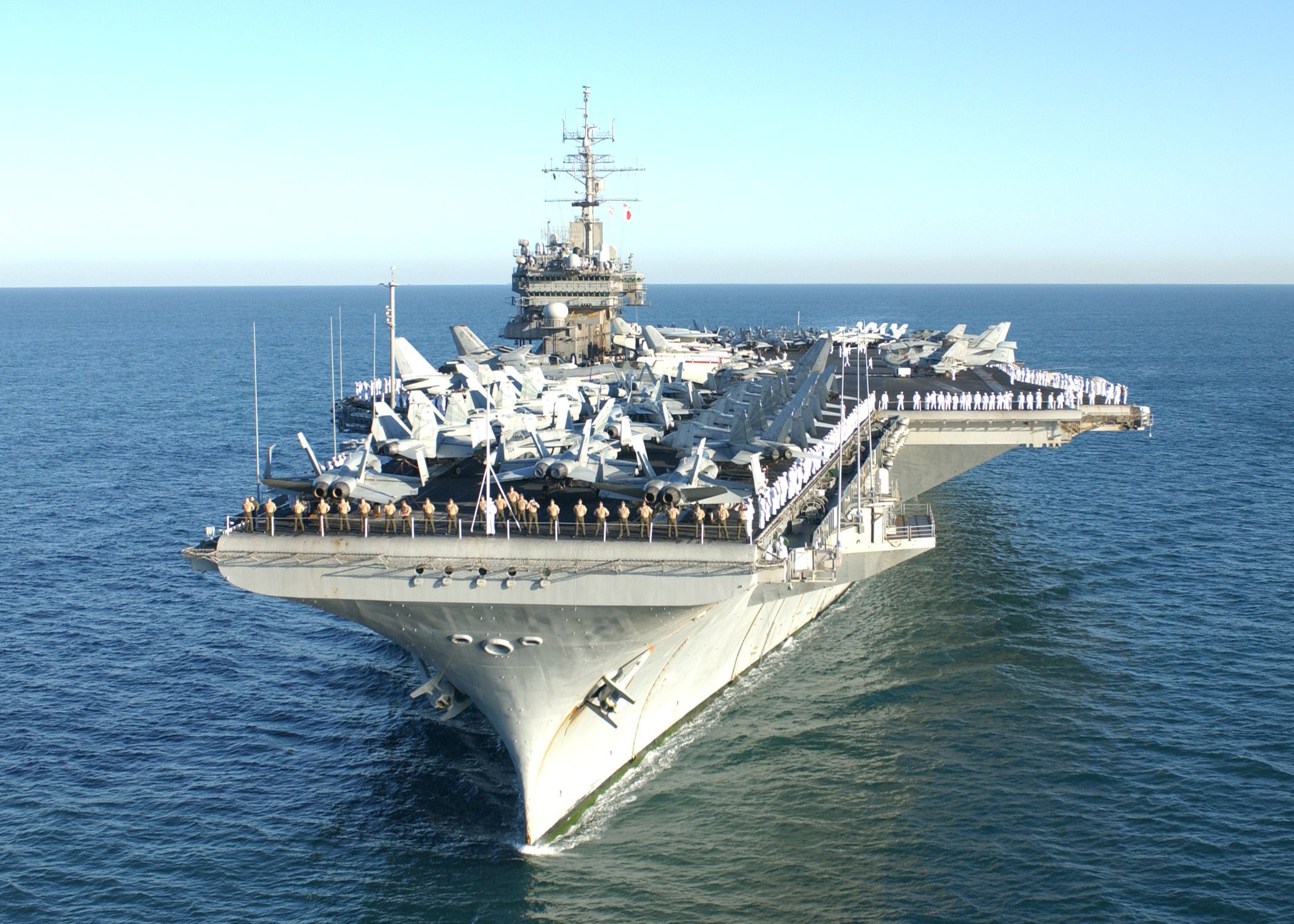
December 19, 1960: Fire on the USS Constellation kills 46 workers while docked in Brooklyn Navy Yard

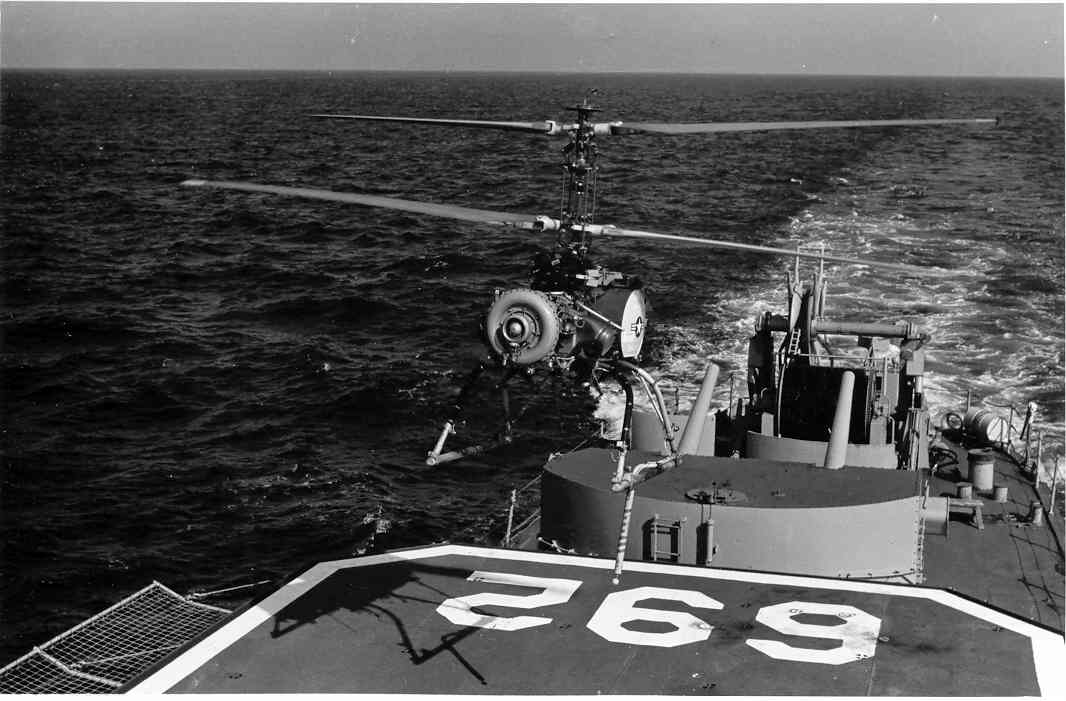
December 7, 1960: A new weapon in war, the remote-controlled flying drone passes its first test

The following events occurred in December 1960:

== December 1, 1960 (Thursday) ==
- The Soviet Union launched Sputnik 6, a 5-ton satellite, into orbit with two dogs, Pchelka ("Little Bee") and Mushka ("Little Fly"), plus mice, insects and plants. The next day, the capsule was reported to have burned up on re-entry into the atmosphere at too steep an angle. According to later reports, a self-destruct system had been built to destroy the satellite if it did not re-enter at the correct time, in order to prevent it from landing outside the Soviet Union.
- The Congolese Army arrested Patrice Lumumba, deposed premier of the Congo, while he was on his way to Stanleyville to meet his supporters. Lumumba would be moved around the country and then shot to death on January 17, 1961.

== December 2, 1960 (Friday) ==
- In the first time since 1397 that England's highest ranking religious leader had visited the Pope, the Most Reverend Geoffrey Francis Fisher, Archbishop of Canterbury and leader of the Anglican Church, talked with Pope John XXIII for about an hour at the Vatican.
- U.S. President Dwight D. Eisenhower authorized the use of one million dollars for the relief and resettlement of Cuban refugees, who had been arriving in Florida at the rate of 1,000 a week.

== December 3, 1960 (Saturday) ==
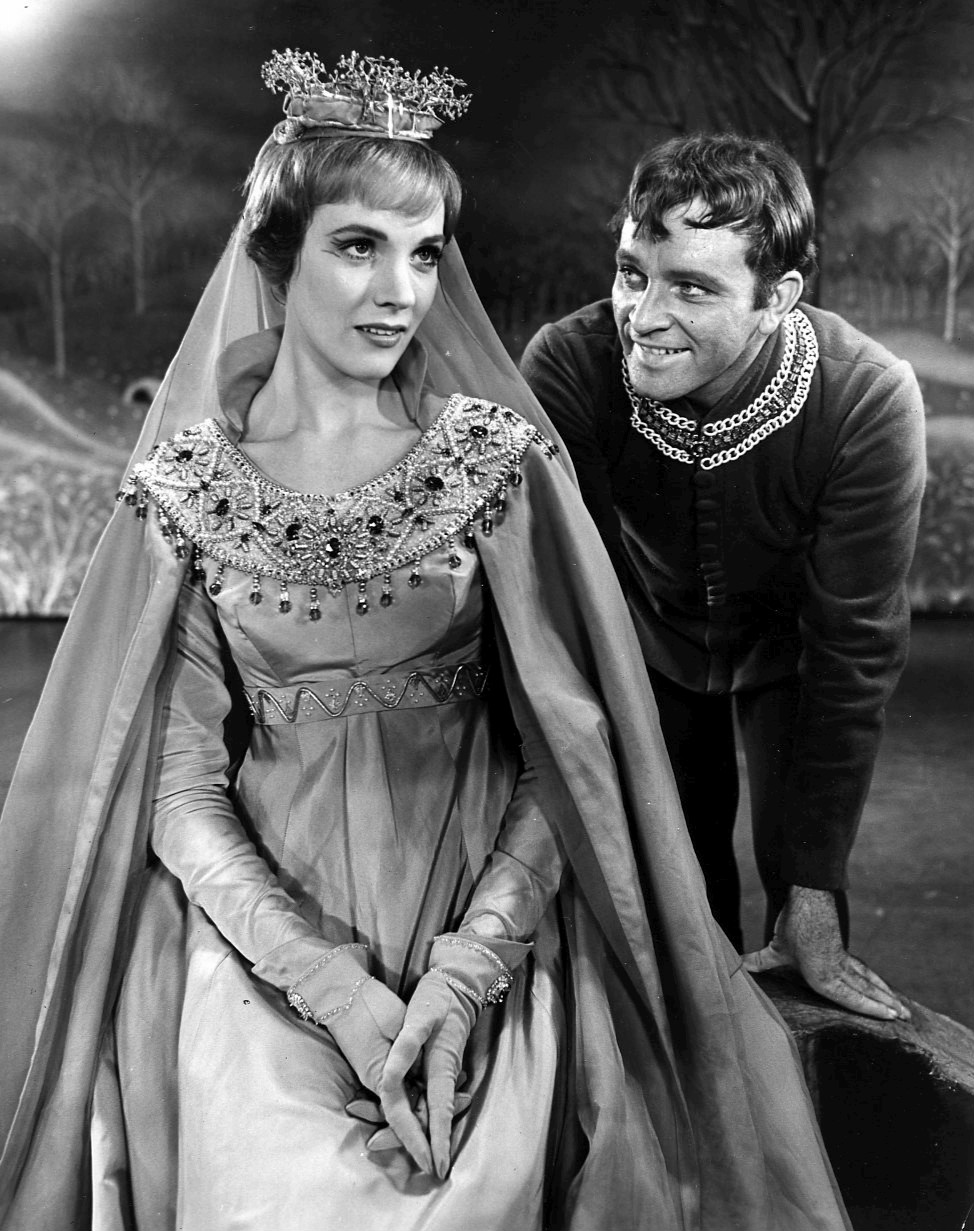
Julie Andrews and Richard Burton in Camelot

- Camelot, the most expensive theatrical production to that time, made its Broadway debut, at the Majestic Theatre, with Richard Burton as King Arthur and Julie Andrews as Lady Guinevere.
- Redstone launch vehicle No. 3 was shipped to Cape Canaveral for the Mercury-Redstone 1A mission.
- Born:
  - Julianne Moore (stage name for Julie Anne Smith), American film and TV actress, winner of the 2015 Academy Award for Best Actress for Still Alice; in Fort Bragg, North Carolina
  - Igor Larionov, Russian ice hockey player who, in 1989, became the first Soviet player to join the NHL; in Voskresensk
  - Daryl Hannah, American film actress known for Splash; in Chicago

== December 4, 1960 (Sunday) ==
- The request by the Islamic Republic of Mauritania to be admitted as the 100th member of the United Nations was vetoed in the Security Council by the Soviet Union, in response to the denial of the request of Mongolia to be admitted. In 1961, Sierra Leone would become the 100th member, followed by Mongolia and Mauritania.
- Born:
  - Glynis Nunn, Australian heptathlete, and 1984 Olympic gold medalist; in Toowoomba, Queensland
  - Fred Ramsdell, American immunologist, in Elmhurst, Illinois

== December 5, 1960 (Monday) ==
- In the case of Boynton v. Virginia, the U.S. Supreme Court declared, by a 7 to 2 vote, that a law requiring permitting bus stations to exclude patrons on the basis of race, was unconstitutional under the Equal Protection Clause. The case had arisen when a law student at Howard University, Bruce Boynton, was fined for refusing to leave a "whites only" restaurant at the Trailways bus terminal in Richmond, Virginia.
- Born: Sarika, Indian film actress; as Sarika Thakur in New Delhi

== December 6, 1960 (Tuesday) ==
- Public Land Order 2216 established the 498,000-acre (2,020 km^{2}) Izembek National Wildlife Range, which included Izembek Lagoon and its entire watershed near the tip of the Alaska Peninsula as "a refuge, breeding ground, and management area for all forms of wildlife".
- U.S. Secretary of the Interior Fred A. Seaton issued Public Land Order 2214, reserving 9,500,000 acres (38,000 km^{2}) of land as the Arctic National Wildlife Refuge.

== December 7, 1960 (Wednesday) ==
- At the request of the government of Dade County, Florida, the U.S. government opened the first federal Cuban Refugee Center, located in Miami, with a staff of 14. By the end of 1961, the center had 300 employees.
- The United Nations Security Council was called into session by the Soviet Union, to consider Soviet demands that the U.N. seek the immediate release of former Congolese Premier Patrice Lumumba.
- The QH-50 DASH (Drone Anti-Submarine Helicopter), a drone that could be guided by remote control, made its first successful unmanned landing, descending upon the USS Hazelwood.
- Died: Clara Haskil, 65, Romanian classical pianist

== December 8, 1960 (Thursday) ==
- The government of Burma (now Myanmar) ratified a treaty with the People's Republic of China to define the boundary between the two nations. Burma agreed to cede 60 square miles of its northernmost territory to China, including three villages, and China ceded the 100 square mile "Mengmao triangle" at the juncture of two rivers southeast of the Burmese city of Bhamo.
- Hayato Ikeda, who had been Prime Minister of Japan since July 19 after the resignation of Nobusuke Kishi, formed a new government following the parliamentary election of November 20.
- The government of Congo-Leopoldville ordered a blockade of all United Nations surface transportation in the central African nation.
- The North Dakota Agricultural College was officially renamed North Dakota State University.

== December 9, 1960 (Friday) ==
- The first episode of the long-running ITV soap opera Coronation Street aired in Britain. It was originally planned to be a 16-part series but became such a success that, running five times or more per week, it continued past its 10,000th episode in its 60th anniversary year. William Roache who played Ken Barlow in the first episode would still be in the show to this day.
- Entrepreneur Tom Monaghan and his brother James took over the operation of "DomiNick's Pizza" store at 301 West Cross Street in Ypsilanti, Michigan. In 1965, after the original owner declined to allow the use of his name for other locations, Tom Monaghan renamed his restaurant Domino's Pizza.
- NASA's Spacecraft No. 7 was delivered to Cape Canaveral for the Mercury 3 mission intended to be the first to put an American astronaut into space. Shepard would be launched in Mercury 3 on May 5, 1961, on a suborbital, 15-minute flight, reaching an altitude of 116.5 miles (187.5 km).
- Japan and the Philippines signed a treaty of amity, commerce and navigation, their first ever. Japanese military forces had invaded the Philippines in World War II and had occupied the islands until the end of the war.
- French President Charles de Gaulle's visit to French Algeria was marked by bloody European and Muslim mob riots in Algeria's largest cities, resulting in 127 deaths.
- Born: Jeff "Swampy" Marsh, American animator, producer, and voice actor known for creating the Disney Channel cartoons Phineas and Ferb and Milo Murphy's Law; in Santa Monica, California

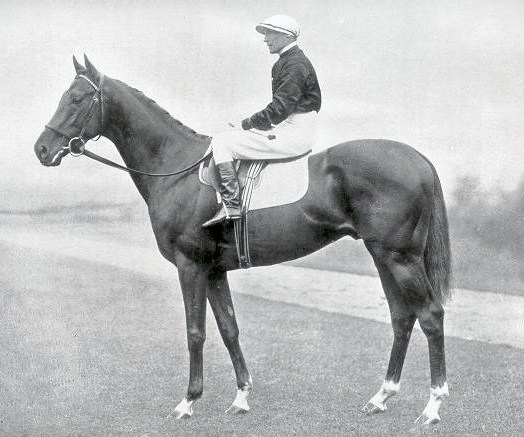
Hyperion

- Died: Hyperion, 30, British thoroughbred racehorse who won the British Triple Crown (2,000 Guineas Stakes, Epsom Derby and St Leger Stakes) in 1943 and later a champion sire.

== December 10, 1960 (Saturday) ==
- The first underwater park within the United States, the John Pennekamp Coral Reef State Park, was formally dedicated. The park covers 178 square miles (460 km^{2}) and protects coral reefs, seagrass, and mangroves inside its boundaries.
- Born: Kenneth Branagh, Northern Irish actor and film director; in Belfast

== December 11, 1960 (Sunday) ==
- Richard Paul Pavlick, a 73-year-old postal clerk from New Hampshire, loaded his car with dynamite and then parked outside the Kennedy family estate in Palm Beach, Florida, and prepared to kill President-elect John F. Kennedy, waiting for Kennedy to depart for Sunday mass. Pavlick changed his mind after seeing that Kennedy was accompanied by his wife and two small children. Pavlick was arrested four days later by Palm Beach city police.

== December 12, 1960 (Monday) ==
- Television came to the South American nation of Ecuador as Red Telesistema de Ecuador (RTS) began regular broadcasting at 5:00 in the afternoon on Channel 4 in Guayaquil. José Rosenbaum, a German-born radio station owner in Ecuador, had purchased three cameras and other TV equipment while visiting a trade fair in West Germany and then spent more than a year with engineers in setting up the station.
- The revision of the most commonly used Spanish-language version of the Holy Bible, the Reina-Valera, was released, and would soon outsell the original. The original version had been published in 1569. A more recent, but not as popular, revision would be released in 1995.

== December 13, 1960 (Tuesday) ==
- In the U.S. presidential election, the Texas board of canvassers awarded all 24 of that state's disputed electoral votes to Democratic Party candidate John F. Kennedy, bringing his total from 249 to 273, three more than the 270 required to win. The decision came two hours after federal judge Ben C. Connally rejected a Republican lawsuit seeking a recount.
- While Emperor Haile Selassie I of Ethiopia was visiting Brazil, his Imperial Bodyguard staged a coup d'etat, taking many of the Imperial staff hostage, including Crown Prince Asfa Wossen, who was proclaimed as King (rather than Emperor). The coup failed within a few days, and Haile Selassie reigned as emperor until another coup in 1975.
- Commander Leroy A. Heath and his navigator, Lt. Henry L. Monroe (Bombardier/Navigator), established a new world record for highest altitude attained in an airplane, reaching 91,450.8 feet (27,874.2 m) in an A3J Vigilante.
- Guatemala, El Salvador, Nicaragua and Honduras founded Sistema de la Integración Centroamericana (SICA), the Central American Integration System, often called the Central American Common Market.
- Died:
  - Isaac Foot, 80, British politician, former Secretary of Mines (1931–1932)
  - John Charles Thomas, 69, American operatic baritone

== December 14, 1960 (Wednesday) ==
- The first "Tied Test" in the history of Test cricket took place at the end of the match in Brisbane between the West Indies and Australia. At the end of the First Innings on December 10, Australia had a 505–453 lead. In the Second Innings, however, the West Indies had outscored Australia 284 to 232. When Australia's last batter, Lindsay Kline, came up for the 7th and final ball, the score had closed to 737 to 737. Kline hit the ball bowled by Wes Hall, and Ian Meckiff dashed toward the wicket for what would have been the winning run, but Joe Solomon fielded the ball and hit the stumps for the last out. "Until today," Percy Beames wrote in Melbourne's newspaper The Age, "there had not been a tie in Test cricket."
- The five-member electoral board of Illinois, with a majority of Republican members, unanimously certified the results of the November 6 popular balloting in the U.S. presidential election and awarded Democrat John F. Kennedy the state's 27 electoral votes. The board had considered Republican charges of voter fraud in Cook County and denied a request for a further election recount. Before the award of the Illinois block, Kennedy had 273, three more than the necessary 270 needed to win.
- In Stanleyville, Congo, Antoine Gizenga proclaimed himself to be the successor to Patrice Lumumba. For four months, Gizenga's forces controlled the Orientale and Kivu provinces, called Free Republic of the Congo, but on April 17, he surrendered in return for a post as a vice premier in the central government.
- By a vote of 89–0, the UN General Assembly Resolution 1514, the "Declaration on the Granting of Independence to Colonial Countries and Peoples" was adopted by the UN member nations. The United States, the United Kingdom, Australia, France, and five other nations abstained.
- The Organisation for Economic Co-operation and Development (OECD) was created by the signing of an international convention by 18 European nations and the United States and Canada.
- Born: Ebrahim Raisi, 8th President of Iran from 2021 until his death in a helicopter crash in 2024; in Mashhad

== December 15, 1960 (Thursday) ==
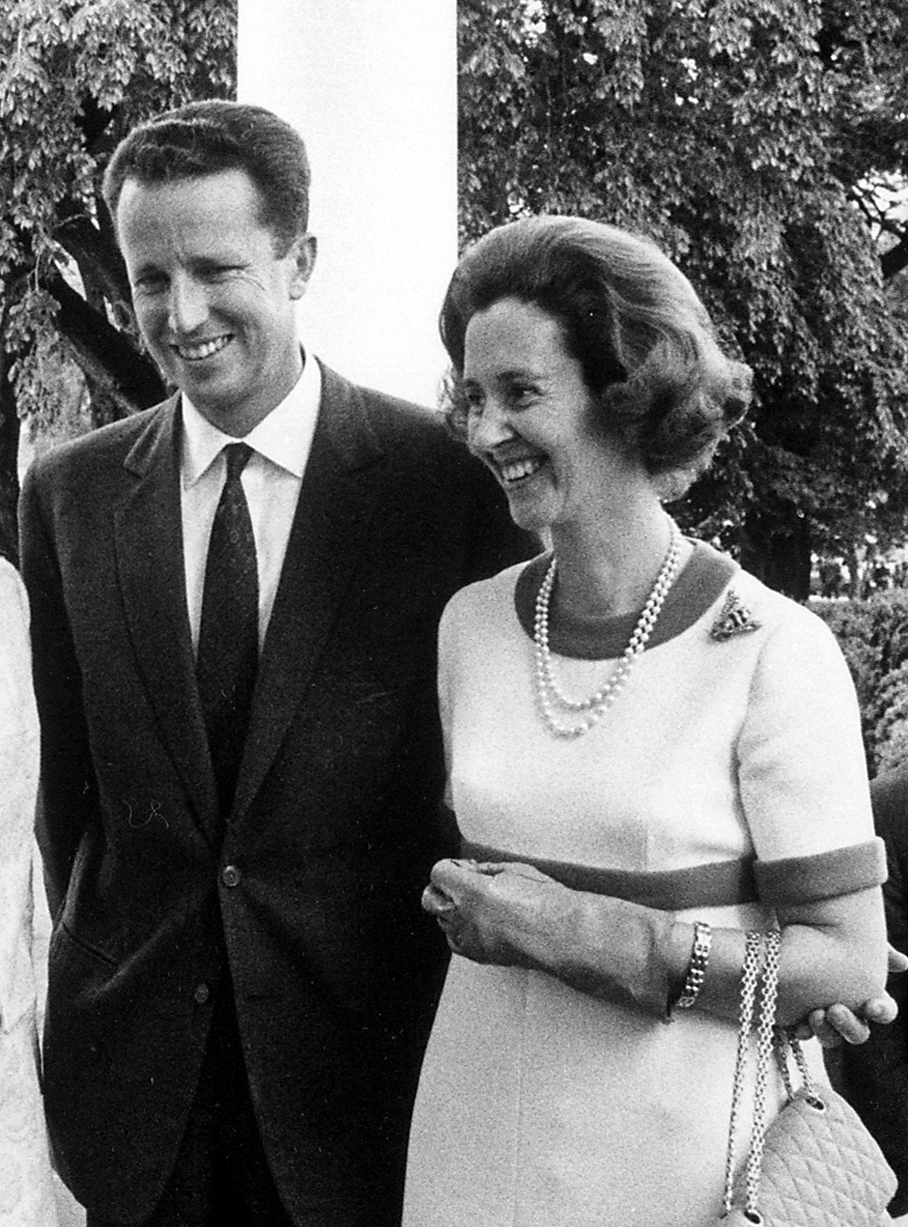
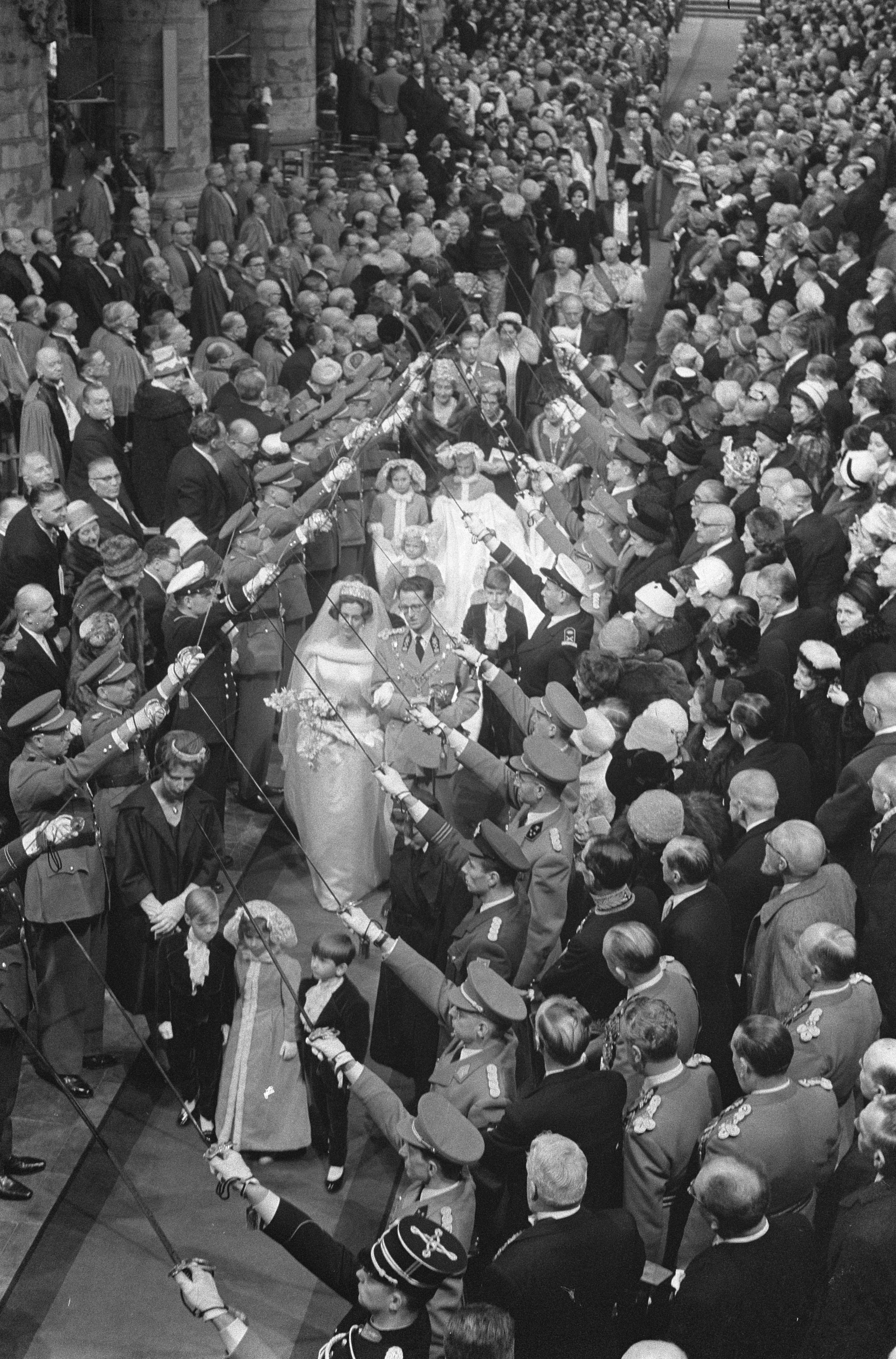
December 15, 1960: Belgium's King Baudouin of Belgium marries Fabiola of Belgium
- In a royal wedding at the Cathedral of St. Michael and St. Gudula in Brussels, King Baudouin of Belgium married Doña Fabiola de Mora y Aragon. Earlier in the day, the two had married in a private civil ceremony at the royal palace.
- After a 19-month experiment in democracy, King Mahendra of Nepal deposed the elected government and restored the absolute monarchy based on the Panchayat system. Prime Minister B. P. Koirala, who had taken office on May 27, 1959 as the Himalayan kingdom's first elected head of government, was arrested on orders of King Mahendra, along with 11 other government ministers.
- Died: Seyum Mangasha, 74, Ethiopian prince and military commander, was killed by rebels during an attempted military coup against the Emperor's government.

== December 16, 1960 (Friday) ==
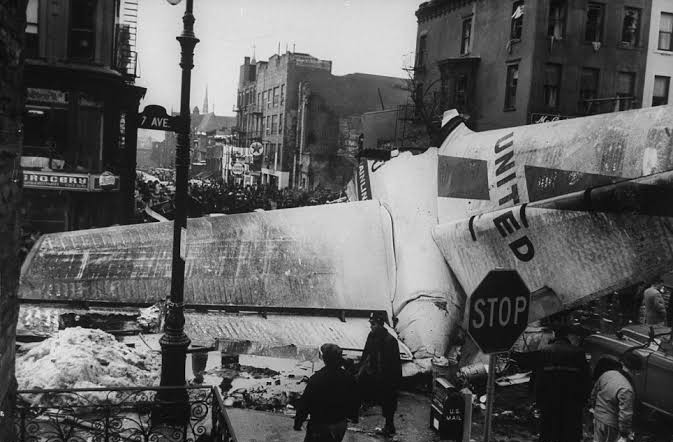
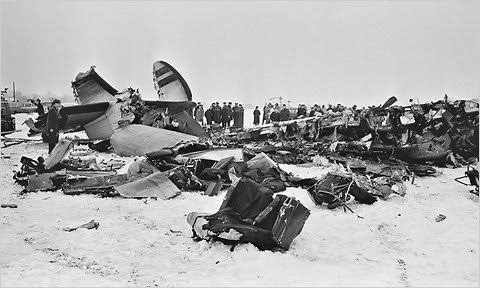
Wreckage of United Flight 826 and TWA Flight 266 in the aftermath of the mid-air collision in New York
- In the collision of two airliners over New York City, 136 people were killed, including eight people on the ground who were struck by falling debris. United Air Lines Flight 826 from Chicago, with 77 passengers and seven crew, was outside its designated holding pattern for circling New York's Idlewild Airport, and collided with TWA Flight 266 5,200 feet (1,600 m) over Staten Island at 10:37 a.m. The United DC-8 jet crashed in Brooklyn at the intersection of 7th Avenue and Sterling Place. Stephen Baltz, 11, was pulled conscious from the wreckage, but died the next day. The TWA plane, a Lockheed Super-Constellation with 39 passengers and five crew, had been on its way from Columbus, Ohio, to New York's La Guardia airport, and crashed on a vacant area at the Miller Field U.S. Army base on Staten Island. In addition to the 128 passengers and crew on both planes, eight more people on the streets of Brooklyn were killed by the falling debris.

== December 17, 1960 (Saturday) ==
- At 2:10 in the afternoon, a U.S. Air Force plane crashed into a crowded street in Munich, West Germany, killing 32 people on the ground and all 20 people on board the airplane. The plane, whose 13 passengers were American college students returning home, lost power after takeoff and clipped the steeple at the St. Paul's Church, then fell onto a streetcar on Martin Greif Straße, near the intersection with Bayerstraße.
- Died: Abebe Aregai, 57, Prime Minister of Ethiopia since 1957, was killed by machine-gun fire as the army stormed the Genetta Leul palace where he was being held hostage by rebels.

== December 18, 1960 (Sunday) ==
- The National Museum of India was opened in New Delhi.
- Born: Léhady Soglo, Beninese politician who ran for president of Benin in 2006 after his father, former president Nicéphore Soglo, was barred from participating; in Paris

== December 19, 1960 (Monday) ==
- A fire killed 46 people and injured 150 others as it swept through the USS Constellation (CV-64), the largest U.S. aircraft carrier up to that time, while Constellation was under construction at the Brooklyn Navy Yard.
- John F. Kennedy was elected as the 35th President of the United States, as the 534 people who had been selected (on November 8) to serve in the Electoral College met in their respective states' capitals. Democratic candidate Kennedy received 300 votes, 31 more than the 269 needed to win, and Republican challenger Richard M. Nixon had 219. U.S. Senator Harry F. Byrd received 15 votes, from all 8 of Mississippi's slate of unpledged electors (a ticket which finished ahead of Kennedy and Nixon), six from Alabama pledged to Kennedy, and one from Oklahoma pledged to Nixon. Hawaii's 3 electors had not been certified, pending a recount of the popular vote, but were awarded to Kennedy prior to the January 6, 1961, tabulation.
- Representatives of twelve African nations, that had formerly been colonies of France, met in Brazzaville in the Republic of Congo and agreed to form an international organization. The African and Malagasy Union, consisting of Cameroon, the Central African Republic, Chad, the Republic of the Congo ("Congo-Brazzaville"), Côte d'Ivoire, Dahomey (now Benin), Gabon, Madagascar, Mauritania, Niger, Senegal and Upper Volta (now Burkina Faso) came into existence on September 12, 1961.

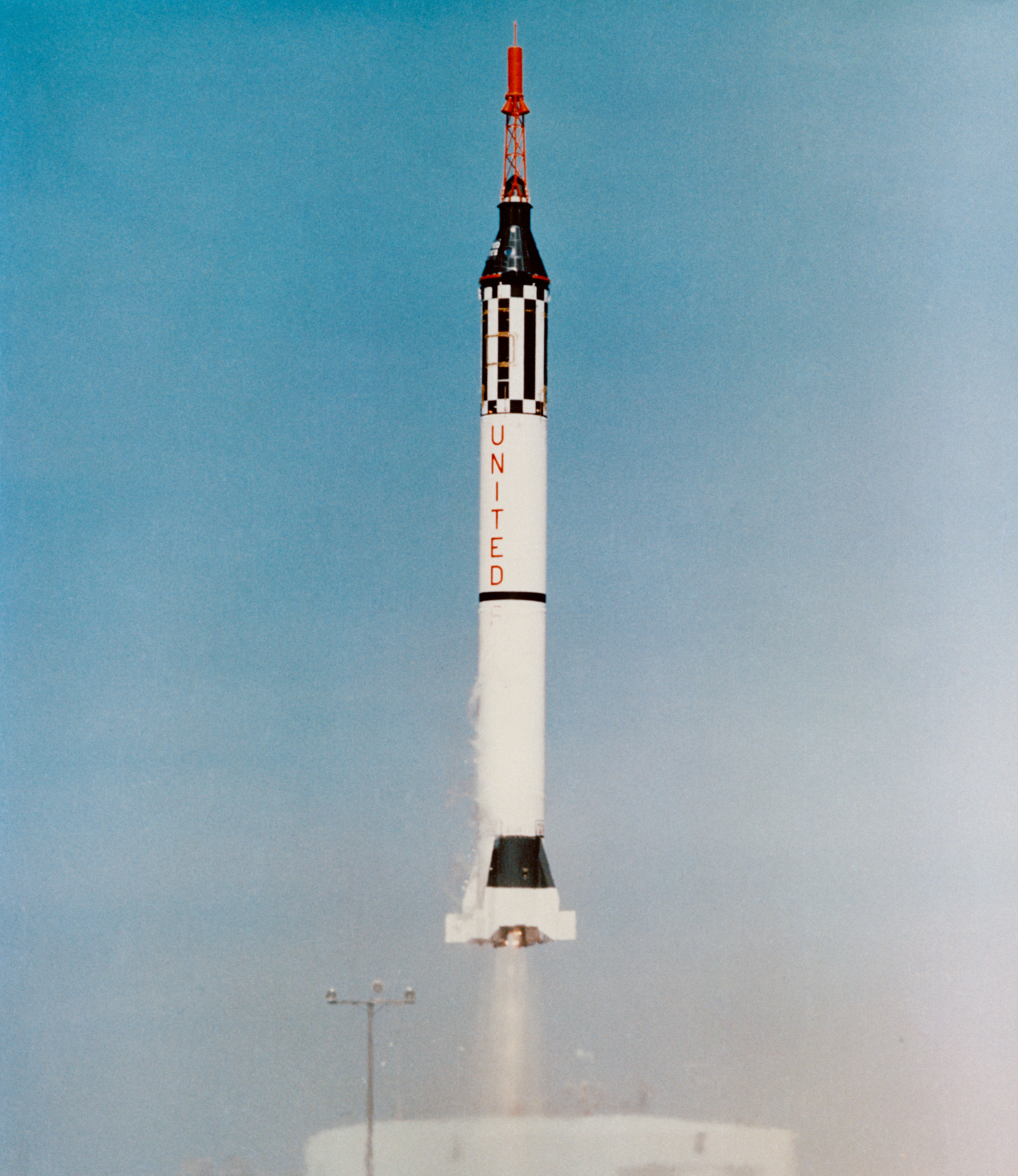
December 19, 1960: Launch of the first Project Mercury rocket in the U.S.

- The uncrewed Mercury-Redstone 1A rocket was launched from Cape Canaveral in a repeat of the unsuccessful November 21, 1960, launch of Mercury-Redstone 1. The first successful mission of the Mercury program was made to qualify the spacecraft for launch into space, and to qualify the flight system for the next phase, launching a non-human living creature (in this case, a chimpanzee) into space. Almost all flight sequences were satisfactory, other than that the launch vehicle cut-off velocity was slightly higher than normal. The spacecraft reached a maximum altitude of 130.68 miles (210.31 km), a range of 234.8 miles (377.9 km), and a speed of 4,909.1 miles per hour (7,900.4 km/h).
- Born: Mike Lookinland, American actor who played as the youngest brother, Bobby Brady, on The Brady Bunch; in Mount Pleasant, Utah

== December 20, 1960 (Tuesday) ==
The Viet Cong flag

- The National Liberation Front (NLF) was created as a Communist political organization in South Vietnam, to oppose the government of President Ngo Dinh Diem, who gave the group the nickname "Viet Cong". As the NLF gained adherents, it began carrying out military attacks against the South Vietnamese Army, and against U.S. forces during the Vietnam War.

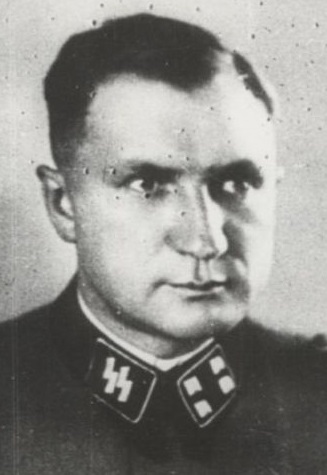
Commandant Baer

- Major Richard Baer, the Nazi commandant of the Auschwitz concentration camp, was arrested in Aumühle, near Hamburg in West Germany, after 15 years as a fugitive. Baer had been posing as "Karl Egon Neuman", a gardener on the estate of the last Chancellor Otto Von Bismarck, since 1945.
- Redstone launch vehicle No. 2 was delivered to Cape Canaveral for the Mercury-Redstone 2 mission (chimpanzee "Ham" flight).
- Born: Pedro Abrunhosa, Portuguese singer-songwriter; in Porto

== December 21, 1960 (Wednesday) ==
- Prince Faisal bin Abdulaziz Al Saud and his cabinet of ministers were dismissed from his job as Prime Minister of Saudi Arabia by his older brother, King Saud, who assumed the job as head of government in addition to his monarchial role as head of state. Faisal retained his position as Crown Prince and would regain the position of Prime Minister on October 31, 1962, which he would continue during his reign as king upon Saud's death on November 2, 1964.
- In the Japanese city of Kumamoto, a fire on the third floor of a cabaret killed 14 people, nine of whom were hostesses, at a party to celebrate the end of the year. The fire spread to adjacent houses and left 100 people homeless.
- All nine crew on a U.S. Navy P2V Neptune patrol plane were killed when the aircraft plummeted into the Atlantic Ocean at a point 67 miles (108 km) south of the Canadian town of Argentia, Newfoundland.
- Eileen Derbyshire, 30, first played the role of Emily Bishop on the British soap opera Coronation Street. She would portray the character for more than fifty years.

== December 22, 1960 (Thursday) ==
- The Vostok-K rocket made its maiden flight, carrying a satellite with two dogs, Kometa and Shutka. An attempt to put the payload into orbit failed when the third stage failed seven minutes into launch, but the dogs survived the landing.
- The crash of Philippine Air Lines Flight 85 killed 28 of the 37 people aboard. The twin-engine DC-3 took off from Cebu City at the start of a scheduled flight to Davao on Mindanao Island when one of its engines failed.
- Massachusetts U.S. Senator John F. Kennedy resigned from his job in preparation for his January 20 inauguration as President of the United States.
- Born:
  - Uncle Luke (stage name for Luther Campbell), American rapper for 2 Live Crew; in Miami
  - Jean-Michel Basquiat, American musician and graffiti painter (d. 1988); in New York City
  - Tyrell Biggs, American heavyweight boxer, 1984 Olympic gold medalist; in Philadelphia
- Died: Sir Ninian Comper, 96, Scottish architect

== December 23, 1960 (Friday) ==
- After the news came out that Israel was building a nuclear reactor, with assistance from France, Egyptian President Gamal Abdel Nasser warned in a nationwide speech that the United Arab Republic would go to war "if we become sure that Israel is building an atom bomb." Nasser added "We shall take every step in order to preserve our country and to destroy our enemy." Nasser later pledged to send Egypt's army to destroy the Dimona Nuclear Centre.
- Born: Miyuki Miyabe, Japanese author; in Tokyo

== December 24, 1960 (Saturday) ==
- The Boston Celtics set an NBA record for most rebounds by a team, 109 rebounds, in a 150–106 win over the visiting Detroit Pistons. Only 2,046 people turned out to Boston Garden to watch the Christmas Eve game.
- A roof collapse killed 21 coal miners in Iran at the Shemshak mine, 40 miles (64 km) northeast of Tehran.
- Born:
  - Charles Ng, Hong Kong-born serial killer who committed numerous crimes in the United States with his accomplice Leonard Lake; in British Hong Kong
  - Carol Vorderman, English television presenter; in Bedford

== December 25, 1960 (Sunday) ==
- The Asian nation of Ceylon (now Sri Lanka) announced that the Soviet Union had agreed to provide Ceylon $33,600,000 in financial aid over the next 10 years.
- Born: Qubilah Shabazz, second daughter of Malcolm X and Betty Shabazz; in New York City

== December 26, 1960 (Monday) ==
- Eleven days after ending an experiment with an elected government, Nepal's absolute monarch, King Mahendra Bir Birkam installed a new government with himself as Prime Minister and nine people as cabinet ministers, including Nepal's Ambassador to the U.S., Rishikesh Shah, and former Foreign Minister Tulsi Giri.
- The Philadelphia Eagles defeated the Green Bay Packers, 17–13, to win the 1960 NFL championship. The AFL title game, between the Houston Oilers and the Los Angeles Chargers, would not take place until New Year's Day 1961.
- In the Soviet Union, all 17 people aboard an Aeroflot Ilyushin Il-18 turboprop were killed when the flight was preparing to land at Ulyanovsk after its departure from Kuybyshev.
- Born: Andrew Graham-Dixon, English art historian; in London
- Died: Tetsuro Watsuji, 71, Japanese philosopher

== December 27, 1960 (Tuesday) ==
- After being forced to leave West Germany, The Beatles made a triumphant return to Liverpool, playing at the ballroom at the Litherland Town Hall. Author Hunter Davies, who wrote the authorized biography of the band, commented that "If it is possible to say that any date was the watershed, this was it. All their development, all their new sounds and new songs, suddenly hit Liverpool that evening. From then on, as far as a devoted fanatical following was concerned, they never looked back."

== December 28, 1960 (Wednesday) ==
- Rebels in the Congo attacked a train that was transporting 300 passengers from Elisabethville to their homes in Katanga Province, many of them schoolchildren and their mothers. Although the train was guarded by UN soldiers from Sweden, it was besieged by hundreds of Baluba tribesmen at Luena, then again at Bukima. At least 20 passengers were killed, and others raped and kidnapped.
- Yakov Zarobyan became first secretary of the Communist Party of Armenia.
- Born:
  - Chad McQueen, former American actor and race-car driver, son of actor Steve McQueen; in Los Angeles
  - Dev Benegal, Indian film director; in New Delhi

== December 29, 1960 (Thursday) ==
- A former U.S. Defense Department employee was arrested by the FBI after taking almost 200 classified documents from the Weapons Systems Evaluation Group division at the Pentagon. Arthur Rogers Roddey, a mathematician who had top secret clearance, was sentenced to eight years in prison on March 22, 1961.
- Born:
  - David Boon, Australian cricketer; in Launceston, Tasmania
  - Dave Pelzer, American author; in Daly City, California

== December 30, 1960 (Friday) ==
- In the Mexican city of Chilpancingo in the state of Guerrero, government troops fired into a crowd of anti-government demonstrators, killing 13 people and wounding 37 others. The protest began after a Mexican Army officer shot and killed a man who was tacking up a poster criticizing the Governor of Guerrero.
- The Third Test match of the series between India and Pakistan began at Eden Gardens, Calcutta.
- Died: Angelo Donati, 75, Italian banker, philanthropist and diplomat known for saving thousands of French Jews from extermination during World War II.

== December 31, 1960 (Saturday) ==
- In the tiny principality of Andorra, Francesc Cairat (Francisco Cayrat) retired after five terms and 15 years as the First Syndic, the chief executive officer as selected by the General Council for a term of three years. He was succeeded by Julià Reig Ribó, who would serve two terms, ending in 1966. The nominal co-princes of Andorra at the time were Ramon Iglesias i Navarri (Spain's Bishop of Urgel) and Charles de Gaulle (President of France).
- After 12 years, compulsory national service came to an end in the United Kingdom. For 12 years after the National Service Act 1948 took effect, men and boys aged 17 to 21 could be drafted into the armed forces during peacetime for an 18-month tour, followed by four years of reserve duty.
- Born: John Allen Muhammad, American spree killer who killed 10 people in the Beltway sniper attacks in 2002; in Baton Rouge, Louisiana (executed, 2009)
