= January 1961 =

Month of 1961

<<	January 1961					>>
Su	Mo	Tu	We	Th	Fr	Sa
1	2	3	4	5	6	7
8	9	10	11	12	13	14
15	16	17	18	19	20	21
22	23	24	25	26	27	28
29	30	31

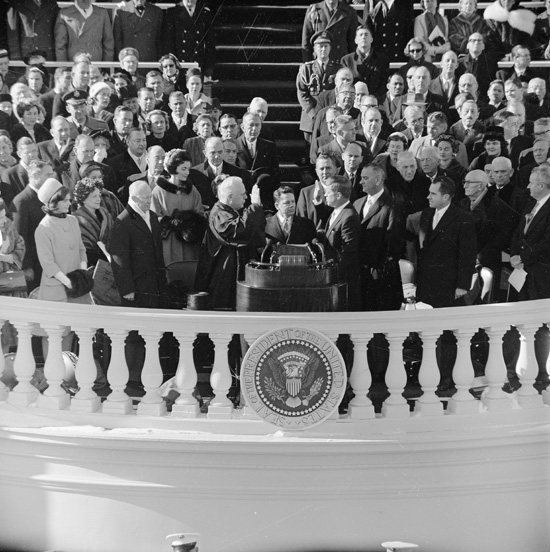
January 20, 1961: Kennedy inaugurated as 35th U.S. President

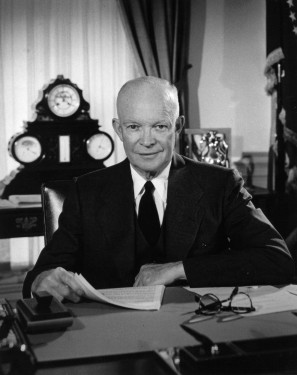
January 17, 1961: Outgoing U.S. President Eisenhower warns against the "military-industrial complex"

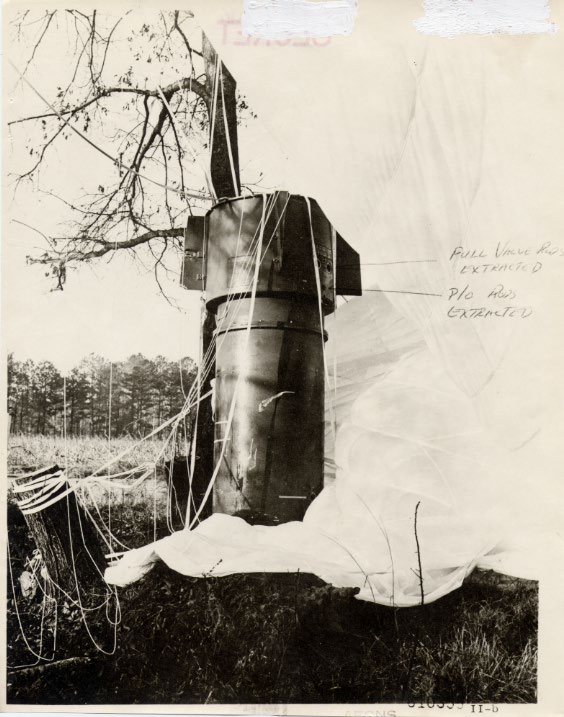
January 24, 1961: Nuclear bomb accidentally dropped on Goldsboro, North Carolina

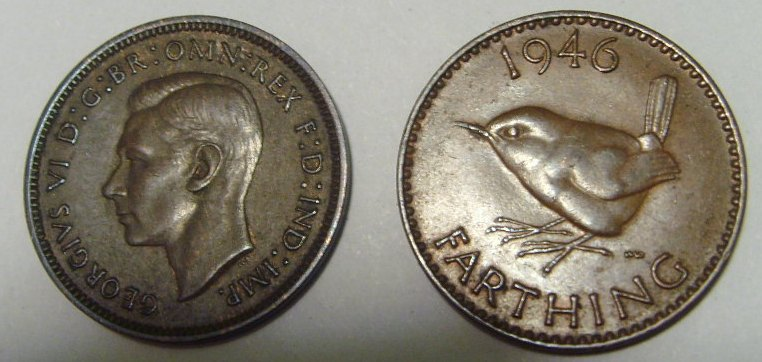
January 1, 1961: British farthing, worth 1/4 a penny, discontinued after 600 years

The following events occurred in January 1961:

== January 1, 1961 (Sunday) ==
- Australia became the second nation to permit the sale of the birth control pill, and the first to allow the Scherer oral contraceptive, with the brand name of Anovlar. The G.D. Searle pill Enovid had been permitted in the United States in May 1960.
- The British farthing coin, used since the 13th century, and worth 1/4 of a penny, ceased to be legal tender.

== January 2, 1961 (Monday) ==
- In the Rose Bowl, the No. 1 ranked Minnesota Gophers were upset by the No. 6 ranked Washington Huskies, 17–7, before a crowd of 97,314 fans in Pasadena, California. The loss, however, did not affect Minnesota's recognition as the national champion of the 1960 college football season, since the final AP and UPI polls were taken prior to the postseason bowl games.
- Cuba's Prime Minister, Fidel Castro, demanded that the United States Embassy in Havana reduce its staff from 87 to only 11 within 48 hours. U.S. President Eisenhower ended diplomatic relations with Cuba the next day.

== January 3, 1961 (Tuesday) ==
- U.S. Marines, guarding the United States Embassy in Cuba, lowered the American flag for the last time for what would be more than half a century, as the Embassy closed and the United States and Cuba severed diplomatic relations. On August 14, 2015, the three Marines who had lowered the flag—Larry Morris, James Tracey, and Francis "Mike" East—would be present at the Embassy and would hand the same flag to three new U.S. Marine guards to be raised again.
- In the worst airplane crash in the history of Finland, all 25 persons on Aero OY Flight 311 died when the DC-3 crashed shortly after takeoff from Vaasa while en route to Kronoby. The plane impacted in trees 6 miles (9.7 km) away, near the village of Koivulahti. A subsequent investigation concluded that both the pilot and co-pilot had been drinking as recently as five hours before takeoff.
- The 87th United States Congress began, with the Democratic Party having a 65 to 35 majority in the U.S. Senate, and 263 to 174 majority in the House of Representatives, although Southern Democrats in 11 states from the Deep South (100 representatives and 21 senators) were conservative.
- At the United States National Reactor Testing Station near Idaho Falls, Idaho, the atomic reactor SL-1 exploded, killing three military technicians.
- The Space Task Group, charged by NASA to conduct Project Mercury and other human spaceflight programs, officially became a separate NASA field element directly under NASA Headquarters. Prior to this time, the Space Task Group was organized under the Goddard Space Flight Center and was administratively supported by the Langley Research Center. As of this date, the personnel strength of Space Task Group was 667.

== January 4, 1961 (Wednesday) ==
- East Germany's Chancellor and Communist party chief, Walter Ulbricht, held a secret emergency meeting of the Politburo of his Socialist Unity Party of Germany, the SED, and told his fellow party leaders that East Germany's own economic failures accounted for 60% of the departure of East Germans to West Germany. He warned the SED that the nation needed to take action to fix housing shortages, low wages, inadequate pensions, and the six-day workweek before the end of the year. Ulbricht also criticized East German schools, pointing out that 75% of the people who left were younger than 25. Most importantly, he created a task force to stop the loss of refugees; the solution would come in the form of the Berlin Wall and the heavily-guarded border in August.
- Michael Goleniewski, an officer of Poland's Army counter-espionage unit GZI WP (Główny Zarząd Informacji Wojska Polskiego or "Main Directorate of Information of the Polish Army"), who also spied on Poland as a double agent for the Soviet Union's KGB, defected to the American CIA office in West Berlin, becoming, in effect, a triple agent.
- Died:
  - Erwin Schrödinger, 73, Austrian physicist and pioneer in quantum mechanics, 1933 Nobel laureate for his discovery of the Schrödinger equation. In 1935, he would propose a popular analogy that is referred to now as Schrödinger's cat.
  - Barry Fitzgerald (stage name for William Joseph Shields), 72, Irish stage, film and TV actor best known for the film Going My Way

== January 5, 1961 (Thursday) ==
- Mister Ed, one of the first "fantasy sitcoms" on American television, premiered as a syndicated TV program and would be picked up by the CBS network beginning on October 1. The show, about a talking horse, was similar in concept to the Francis the Talking Mule film comedies of the 1950s and starred Alan Young as Wilbur Post, and Allan "Rocky" Lane as the voice of the horse. "Mister Ed" was portrayed by an American saddlebred horse, Bamboo Harvester. The show ran for five years, ending on February 6, 1966.
- Italian sculptor Alfredo Fioravanti went to the U.S. Consulate in Rome and signed a confession, stating that he had been part of a team that forged the Etruscan terracotta warriors in the Metropolitan Museum of Art.
- Officials of McDonnell Aircraft Corporation began a two-day presentation to NASA for a one-person space station, consisting of a Mercury capsule and a cylindrical space laboratory capable of supporting one astronaut in a shirt-sleeve environment for 14 days in orbit. The complete vehicle, as described by the McDonnell officials, could be placed in a 240-kilometre (150 mi) orbit by an Atlas-Agena booster, thus affording NASA what the company termed a "minimum cost manned space station."
- On the same day, NASA's Space Exploration Program Council opened two days of meetings in Washington, D.C., to discuss a landing my astronauts on the Moon. Among the results of the meeting was an agreement that NASA should plan an earth-orbital rendezvous program independent of, although contributing to, the crewed lunar program.

== January 6, 1961 (Friday) ==
- John F. Kennedy was formally elected as the 35th president of the United States, as a joint session of the U.S. Congress witnessed the counting of the electoral vote. U.S. Vice-President Richard Nixon, who had opposed Kennedy in the 1960 election, formally announced the result, saying, "I now declare John F. Kennedy elected president." The results were 303 votes for Kennedy, 219 for Nixon, and 15 for U.S. Senator Harry F. Byrd, Jr.
- Blamed on a person smoking in bed, a fire at a San Francisco hotel for the elderly killed 20 of the 135 residents. Police charged the smoker, who escaped unhurt, with manslaughter. He was released for lack of evidence, and would die of cirrhosis four months later.
- Born: Georges Jobé, Belgian motocross rider, and five-time world champion between 1980 and 1992; in Retinne (d. 2012)

== January 7, 1961 (Saturday) ==
- The NFL's first "Playoff Bowl", between the second-place finishers in the league's Eastern and Western Conferences, took place in Miami. Officially, the game was called the "Bert Bell Benefit Bowl" and raised money for the NFL players' pension fund. Playing a week after Philadelphia beat Green Bay in the NFL championship, the Detroit Lions won third place in a 17–16 victory over the Cleveland Browns.
- In the first round of the Los Angeles Open golf tournament in the United States, golfing legend Arnold Palmer took 12 strokes to complete the 18th hole. The defending Masters and U.S. Open champion hit his first four shots at the green out of bounds, for four penalties; it took two more strokes to reach the green, and, once there, two more to sink the ball.
- After leading Duke 36–33 at halftime, North Carolina State's basketball team lost 81–67. Months later, it was revealed that two N.C. State players had been paid $1,250 each by gamblers for point shaving. The two were paid $2,500 each in the Wolfpack's 62–56 loss, on February 15, to North Carolina.
- Following a four-day conference in Casablanca, five African chiefs of state announced plans for a NATO-type African organization to ensure common defense. From the Charter of Casablanca emerged the Casablanca Group, consisting of Morocco, the United Arab Republic, Ghana, Guinea, and Mali.

== January 8, 1961 (Sunday) ==
- In France, a referendum supported Charles de Gaulle's policies on independence for Algeria with a majority of 75% (17,447,669 to 5,817,775) in favor.

== January 9, 1961 (Monday) ==
- British authorities announced that they had discovered the Soviet Portland spy ring in London. Arrested on January 7 were Harry Houghton, Ethel Gee and Gordon Lonsdale.
- In the former Belgian Congo, aides of jailed premier Patrice Lumumba formed the "Republic of Lualaba", in the valley of the Lualaba River.
- Born: Candi Milo, American voice actress; in Palm Springs, California

== January 10, 1961 (Tuesday) ==
- A committee chaired by Dr. Jerome Wiesner, professor of electrical engineering at MIT and John F. Kennedy's choice for science adviser, issued Report to the President-Elect of the Ad Hoc Committee on Space.
- The University of Georgia was forced to admit its first African-American students, after U.S. District Judge William Bootle ordered the university to admit Charlayne Hunter and Hamilton E. Holmes.
- Ali Amini, the Prime Minister of Iran, announced a program for land reforms, but was unable to implement the ideas because of disagreement with the Shah of Iran.
- Died:
  - Dashiell Hammett, 66, American detective novelist, creator of Sam Spade, Nick and Nora Charles, and The Continental Op
  - Isabel Paterson, 74, Canadian-born American journalist, political philosopher, and author of The God of the Machine

== January 11, 1961 (Wednesday) ==
- Ukrainian SSR Communist Party Chief Nikolai Podgorny was berated by Soviet First Secretary Nikita Khrushchev after corn production fell short of goals set for 1960. In a session of the party's Central Committee in Moscow, Khrushchev accused Podgorny of lying to conceal theft and warned, "You will pay for this lack of leadership." Podgorny, along with Leonid Brezhnev and Alexei Kosygin, would be part of the troika that would overthrow Khrushchev in 1964.
- USAF test pilot Jack B. Mayo disappeared over the Gulf of Mexico while test-firing M61 Vulcan cannons from a Republic F-105D Thunderchief. He was officially declared missing eight days later. In 1959, Mayo had been one of the 32 finalists for NASA Astronaut Group 1.
- The name Grampian Television was selected for independent television's new service covering the north of Scotland, replacing the name North of Scotland Television. The Grampian Mountains are one of three mountain ranges in Scotland.
- The University of Georgia admitted African-American students for the first time, five days after a federal judge ordered integration. Hamilton Holmes and Charlayne Hunter were the first to begin classes in Athens.
- The Naval Auxiliary Landing Field San Clemente Island was renamed "Frederick Sherman Field" in honor of Vice Admiral Frederick C. Sherman, a U.S. naval commander of World War I and World War II.
- The Pisces, a yacht carrying Moroccan Jews to Israel, capsized off the coast of Algeciras, Spain, drowning the 40 passengers and all but 3 of the crew. The ship's captain survived.
- Born:
  - Karl von Habsburg, former member of the European Parliament for Austria, and eldest son of the last Crown Prince of Austria-Hungary, celebrated by monarchists since 2011 as the would-be Emperor Karl II; in Starnberg, West Germany
  - Lars-Erik Torph, Swedish rally driver; in Säffle (d. 1989)
  - Jasper Fforde, English novelist; in London

== January 12, 1961 (Thursday) ==
- Norwegian Olympic sailing champion Johan Ferner married Princess Astrid of Norway at Asker church near Oslo.
- Born: Simon Russell Beale, English actor; in Penang state, Malaysia

== January 13, 1961 (Friday) ==
- The United States and Brazil concluded a treaty of extradition at Rio de Janeiro, signed by Francisco Clementino de San Tiango Dantas (the Brazilian Minister of State for External Relations), and U.S. Ambassador to Brazil Lincoln Gordon.
- General Cemal Gürsel, the President of Turkey since a May 27 coup, announced that the ban on political activity had been lifted and that parliamentary elections would be scheduled for October 15.
- The former British Navy aircraft carrier HMS Vengeance was recommissioned into the Brazilian Navy as the Minas Gerais.
- Born:
  - Julia Louis-Dreyfus, American actress and comedienne known for Seinfeld and Saturday Night Live; in New York City
  - Suggs (stage name for Graham McPherson), British singer-songwriter and musician known for being the lead singer of the ska rock band Madness; in Hastings, East Sussex
- Died:
  - Henry Morton Robinson, 62, American novelist, died of second-degree burns he had sustained on December 23 while taking a bath.
  - Lem Winchester, 32, American jazz musician, was accidentally killed "while demonstrating a gun trick that backfired"
  - František Drtikol, 77, Czech portrait photographer

== January 14, 1961 (Saturday) ==
- In the final week of his administration, U.S. President Dwight D. Eisenhower issued an Executive Order that closed a loophole that allowed American people and companies to own gold outside of the United States. Since 1933, people and companies under American jurisdiction were barred from buying, selling or owning gold within the U.S., but were not prohibited from hoarding it outside of the country. The new order directed that all Americans who held gold coins, gold bars, and foreign gold securities and gold certificates, would have to dispose of their holdings no later than June 1. The move came after the U.S. trade deficit had grown by ten billion dollars over the previous three years.
- The Professional Footballers' Association, trade union for the soccer football players in the professional leagues of England and Wales, called off plans for a strike in the middle of the 1960–61 Football League season. PFA director Jimmy Hill had threatened the strike after The Football League refused to lift a salary cap that limited even the best players to no more than £20 per game (twenty pounds sterling, comparable to £424 in 2017). The English League relented, as "the threat of a strike effectively finished the era of the maximum wage".
- India's third nuclear reactor, ZERLINA, the Zero Energy Reactor for Lattice Investigations and New Assemblies, went into operation. The reactor had a maximum power of not more than 100 watts and was limited to research on "the properties of various types of nuclear fuels" and would be dismantled in 1983.
- Born: Vissarion, Russian mystic who claims to be a reincarnation of Jesus Christ; as Sergei Anatolyevich Torop in Krasnodar, Russian SFSR

== January 15, 1961 (Sunday) ==
- The collapse of an offshore radar tower off the coast of New Jersey killed all 28 men on board. Rescuers heard tapping from within the wreckage on the first day after the disaster, but were unable to reach the survivors. At 7:33 p.m., the 185-foot (56 m) tall tower, nicknamed "Old Shaky", vanished from radar screens at Otis Air Force Base. Only two bodies were found. Three U.S. Air Force officers were later charged with neglect of duty in connection with the accident.
- Motown Records signed The Supremes to their first recording contract.

== January 16, 1961 (Monday) ==
- In Sheldon, Iowa, bank teller Burnice Geiger was arrested after federal bank examiners discovered that she had embezzled money from the Sheldon National Bank. Initially, audits showed more than $120,000 missing over a three-year period. Mrs. Geiger admitted to stealing a total of $2,126,859.10 — an American record to that time, equivalent to $14 million fifty years later. Sentenced to 15 years in prison, she served five, and lived until 1981.
- The United States banned travel by its citizens to Cuba, except in cases where a special endorsement was included on a passport.
- The Festival de Télévision de Monte-Carlo was launched by Rainier III, Prince of Monaco.

== January 17, 1961 (Tuesday) ==
- U.S. President Dwight Eisenhower gave his farewell address on nationwide television, with the warning, "We must guard against the acquisition of unwarranted influence, whether sought or unsought, by the 'military-industrial complex' ...We must never let the weight of this combination endanger our liberties or democratic processes."
- The keel was laid for the American submarine USS Lafayette, at the shipyard of the Electric Boat Division of General Dynamics in Groton, Connecticut.

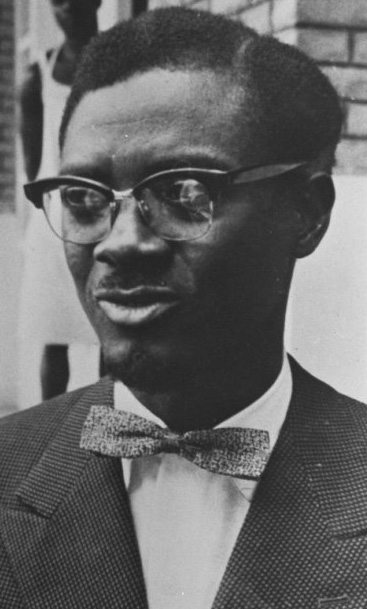
Lumumba

- Died: Patrice Lumumba, 35, former leader of Republic of Congo from June 24 to September 5, 1960, was secretly executed by a firing squad

== January 18, 1961 (Wednesday) ==
- The Chaplain's Medal for Heroism, created especially for George D. Fox, Alexander D. Goode, Clark V. Poling, and John P. Washington, was awarded to them posthumously and presented to their next of kin by Wilber M. Brucker, U.S. Secretary of the Army, at a ceremony at Fort Myer. On February 3, 1943, the "Four Chaplains" had given up their own lifejackets to save the lives of four soldiers on the troop transport Dorchester, and then went down with the ship.
- In what the Guinness Book of World Records listed under "Closest election", the general election in Zanzibar, the Afro-Shirazi Party (ASP) won 10 seats, and the Zanzibar Nationalist Party (ZNP) won 9. Specifically, the seat for the constituency of Chake-Chake was won by the margin of one vote, with 1,538 for the ASP and 1,537 for the ZNP.
- Born: Mark Messier, Canadian NHL player; in Edmonton
- Died: Thomas Anthony Dooley III, 34, American physician and humanitarian; from cancer

== January 19, 1961 (Thursday) ==
- In New Zealand, the filling of Lake Ohakuri began. Within two weeks, a reservoir of nearly 5 square miles (13 km^{2}) was created and a supply of hydroelectric power was created. At the same time, two of the world's largest geysers—the 295-foot (90 m) high Minquini and the 180-foot (55 m) high Orakeikorako—were covered over and made extinct.
- An Aeronaves de México DC-8B airline flight, bound for Mexico City, crashed shortly after taking off in a blizzard from New York's Idlewild Airport. Although the plane fell from an altitude of 50 feet (15 m) and burst into flames, 102 of the 106 people on board, including all of the passengers, survived.

== January 20, 1961 (Friday) ==
- John F. Kennedy took the oath of office as the 35th president of the United States. For the first time, the event was shown on color television, pioneered by the NBC network. In his inaugural address, limited to 1,566 words, Kennedy memorably said "Let the word go forth from this time and place, to friend and foe alike, that the torch has been passed to a new generation of Americans—born in this century, tempered by war, disciplined by a hard and bitter peace, proud of our ancient heritage—and unwilling to witness or permit the slow undoing of those human rights to which this nation has always been committed, and to which we are committed today at home and around the world," and concluded by saying "And so, my fellow Americans: ask not what your country can do for you—ask what you can do for your country."
- NASA's Space Task Group management held a Capsule Review Board meeting, discussing the question of what additional missions would be followed after the initial Mercury program, with consideration of long-duration missions, a space rendezvous between separately launched vehicles linking in orbit, flight tests of advanced equipment— and the possibility, not attained as of 60 years later, of artificial gravity.

== January 21, 1961 (Saturday) ==
- Hours after a speedy confirmation in a special session of the United States Senate, all ten members of President John F. Kennedy's cabinet were sworn into office in a ceremony at the White House, including the President's younger brother, Robert F. Kennedy, who became the new Attorney General.
- Loaded with 16 nuclear tipped Polaris A-1 missiles, the submarine USS George Washington completed its first "deterrent patrol", after having remained submerged for a record 66 consecutive days.
- The first Cosquín Festival, Argentina's major folk music festival, began.
- Died: Blaise Cendrars, 73, Swiss/French novelist and poet

== January 22, 1961 (Sunday) ==
- The international Masonic organization CLIPSAS (Centre of Liaison and Information of Masonic Powers, Signatories of Appeal of Strasbourg) was formed in Strasbourg.
- The American Ballet Center Company dance troupe, formed on October 1, 1956, began a 47-city tour with its new name, the Robert Joffrey Ballet, now known as the Joffrey Ballet.
- The first Coronda River Aquatic Marathon, a 57-kilometer (35 mi) swimming endurance race, took place in Argentina.
- Born: Luba Orgonasova, Slovak operatic soprano; in Bratislava, Czechoslovakia

== January 23, 1961 (Monday) ==
- A group of 29 men, led by Portuguese rebel Henrique Malta Galvao, hijacked the cruise ship Santa Maria which was carrying 580 passengers and a crew of 360. The group had boarded with tickets at La Guaira, Venezuela, and then executed the attack at 1:30 a.m. One member of the crew was killed and several wounded. After putting the wounded ashore, the ship sailed with other ships trying to locate it. Galvao threatened to scuttle the ship if it was attacked. The crisis would end on February 2, as Galvao surrendered the ship at Recife, Brazil.
- In Lebanon, the Political Bureau dissolved the militants' organization; William Hawi created the Regulatory Forces.

== January 24, 1961 (Tuesday) ==
- A B-52 Stratofortress, with two Mark 39 nuclear bombs, crashed on a farm in the community of Faro, 12 miles (19 km) north of Goldsboro, North Carolina. Three USAF officers were killed. One of the bombs went partially through its arming sequence, as five of its six safety switches failed. The one remaining switch prevented a 24 megaton nuclear explosion.
- Mel Blanc, the voice of Bugs Bunny and many other cartoon characters, was seriously injured in a head-on collision while driving in Los Angeles. Blanc was in a coma for three weeks and was reported as killed in at least one newspaper (possibly the Hilo Tribune-Herald), but his versatile voice was unaffected, and he continued working until his death in 1989.
- All 21 people on board Garuda Indonesian Airways Flight 424 were killed when the Douglas DC-3 plane crashed into the 6,772-foot (2,064 m) Mount Burangrang at an altitude of 5,400 feet (1,600 m). The plane had taken off from Jakarta en route to Bandung.
- Marilyn Monroe was granted a divorce from playwright Arthur Miller, after filing an action in Ciudad Juárez, Mexico.
- Died: Elsa the Lioness, 4, Kenyan-born lion who was the subject of the 1960 book and the 1966 film Born Free; after being raised by author Joy Adamson and returned to the wild.

== January 25, 1961 (Wednesday) ==
- In Washington, D.C., John F. Kennedy began a tradition by holding the first live presidential press conference. Broadcast on all 3 TV networks at 6:00 p.m. EST, the event was attended by 418 reporters and watched by an estimated 60,000,000 viewers. Kennedy announced that the Soviet Union had freed the two surviving crewmen of a USAF RB-47 reconnaissance plane shot down over the Barents Sea on July 1, 1960.
- Acting to halt 'leftist excesses,' a six-member junta, headed by Colonel Julio Adalberto Rivera composed of 2 army officers and four civilians took over El Salvador, ousting another military junta that had ruled for three months.
- One Hundred and One Dalmatians, the 17th full-length animated film by Walt Disney, had its world premiere, at 8:00 p.m. at the Florida Theatre in St. Petersburg, Florida.

== January 26, 1961 (Thursday) ==
- John F. Kennedy appointed Janet G. Travell as his physician, the first woman to hold this appointment.
- Born: Wayne Gretzky, Canadian NHL star who was the National Hockey League's Most Valuable Player for eight consecutive seasons, 1980 to 1987, NHL scoring champion for nine seasons; in Brantford, Ontario

== January 27, 1961 (Friday) ==
- Leontyne Price became the first African-American woman to sing a leading role at the Metropolitan Opera House in New York. Her performance as Leonora in Il trovatore received a 42-minute ovation.
- The Soviet submarine S-80, with a crew of 68, vanished in the Barents Sea. The wreckage of the S-80 was not discovered until more than seven years later.

== January 28, 1961 (Saturday) ==
- In Atlanta, Georgia, Malcolm X and Jeremiah Shabazz of the black supremacist Nation of Islam met secretly with representatives of the white supremacist Ku Klux Klan to discuss common interests, including preventing integration of the races. NOI leader Elijah Muhammad and KKK leader J. B. Stoner had arranged the meeting, with the Klan agreeing to help the "Black Muslims" acquire land for resettlement.
- In Gitarama, in the Belgian colony of Rwanda, a group of Hutu politicians declared an end to the Tutsi monarchy and the creation of a republic, with Dominique Mbonyumutwa as its first President. Mbonyumutwa was replaced by Grégoire Kayibanda before Rwanda was granted independence in 1962.
- An indoor high school basketball game in Pennsylvania, was "rained out". Cold air from an open window combined with heat in a gymnasium to create puddles of condensation on the floor. The game was called with West Hazleton High leading McAdoo High, 31–29.
- Bobo Brazil became the first African American to win a U.S. National Wrestling Alliance title, pinning Dick the Bruiser in the heavyweight pro wrestling match at Detroit.
- The Smothers Brothers, comedians Tom and Dick Smothers, first appeared on U.S. national television, as guests on the Tonight show, hosted by Jack Paar.
- Supercar, the first family sci-fi TV series filmed in Supermarionation, made its debut on Associated Television (ATV) in the UK.

== January 29, 1961 (Sunday) ==
- Five days after arriving in New York after hitchhiking from Madison, Wisconsin, 21-year-old musician Bob Dylan met his idol Woody Guthrie. After hearing Dylan sing, Guthrie is said to have remarked "He's a talented boy. Gonna go far." Dylan settled in Greenwich Village and found fame in protest folk music.
- Radio Hanoi announced in an English-language broadcast that the National Liberation Front of South Vietnam, popularly known as the Viet Cong, had been formed to overthrow the government there and to establish a regime similar to that in Communist North Vietnam.
- In the finals of the 1961 European Figure Skating Championships, Sjoukje Dijkstra won gold for the second year in succession. Dijkstra went on to win World Championship and Olympic gold, becoming one of the best-known female figure skaters of all time.
- The Irvine Company deeded 1,000 acres of land in Orange County to the regents of the University of California, creating the campus upon which University of California, Irvine would be built, and around which the city of Irvine, California would be formed.
- Died: Sir Geoffrey Jefferson, 84, British neurosurgeon

== January 30, 1961 (Monday) ==
- Disenchanted with life in the Soviet Union, American defector Lee Harvey Oswald wrote to President Kennedy's newly appointed U.S. Secretary of the Navy, John Connally, to ask for a reversal of Oswald's dishonorable discharge from the United States Marines. The letter was never acted upon, and on November 22, 1963, Oswald would become the alleged shooter of both Kennedy and Connally.
- President Kennedy approved a $41 million counterinsurgency plan, drawn up for President Eisenhower by General Edward Lansdale, to help the government of South Vietnam resist communist aggression. Designed to add 52,000 men to that nation's army and civil guards, the plan included provisions for American soldiers and military advisers to assist in the effort.
- The United States animated television series, The Yogi Bear Show, was broadcast in syndication for the first time, having been created after the Yogi Bear segments from The Huckleberry Hound Show proved more popular than those of the title character.
- U.S. President John F. Kennedy delivered his first State of the Union Address, a pessimistic outlook of the challenges posed in the Cold War.
- Born: Dexter King, African-American activist, son of Martin Luther King Jr. and Coretta Scott King; in Atlanta (died of prostate cancer, 2024)
- Died: Dorothy Thompson, 66, American journalist

== January 31, 1961 (Tuesday) ==
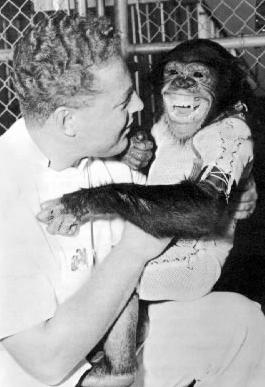
Ham, a spacefaring chimpanzee, and his trainer Joseph V. Brady

- Ham, a 37-pound (17 kg) male chimpanzee, was rocketed into space from Cape Canaveral aboard Mercury-Redstone 2, in a test of the Project Mercury capsule, thereby becoming the first hominid in space.

During the powered phase of the flight, the thrust of the propulsion system was considerably higher than planned. In addition, the early depletion of the liquid oxygen caused a signal that separated the spacecraft from the launch vehicle a few seconds before planned. The over-acceleration of the launch vehicle coupled with the velocity of the escape rocket caused the spacecraft to attain a higher altitude and a longer range than planned. However, spacecraft recovery was effected, although there were some leaks, and the spacecraft was taking on water. Ham appeared to be in good physiological condition, but sometime later when he was shown the spacecraft it was visually apparent that he had no further interest in cooperating with the space flight program. Despite the over-acceleration factor, the flight was considered to be successful. Ham's 16 1/2-minute flight demonstrated to American NASA officials that the capsule could safely carry human astronauts into space.

- Hermann Höfle, an Austrian-born member of the Nazi Party who had overseen the deportation of Poland's Jews to extermination camps, was arrested in Salzburg shortly after being identified as a war criminal by Adolf Eichmann during Eichmann's war crimes trial. For nine years, Höfle had been working at his pre-war trade as an auto mechanic and was working at the Salzburg water department at the time of his arrest. His crime confirmed in the 1943 "Höfle Telegram", in which he bragged of exterminating a total of 1,274,166 Jews in four camps during Operation Reinhard. Höfle would hang himself in a Vienna prison on August 21, 1962, before he could be put on trial.
- The American State of Georgia, with the support of most of its residents, repealed its longstanding laws requiring segregation by race in its public schools. Governor S. Ernest Vandiver, in signing the "open schools package" of legislation, declared, "These are the four most important bills to be signed in this century in Georgia".
- James Meredith, an African-American, applied for admission to the all-white University of Mississippi, beginning a legal action that would result in the desegregation of the university.
