= Sierra Wave =

Type of air current created by the Sierra Nevada mountain range

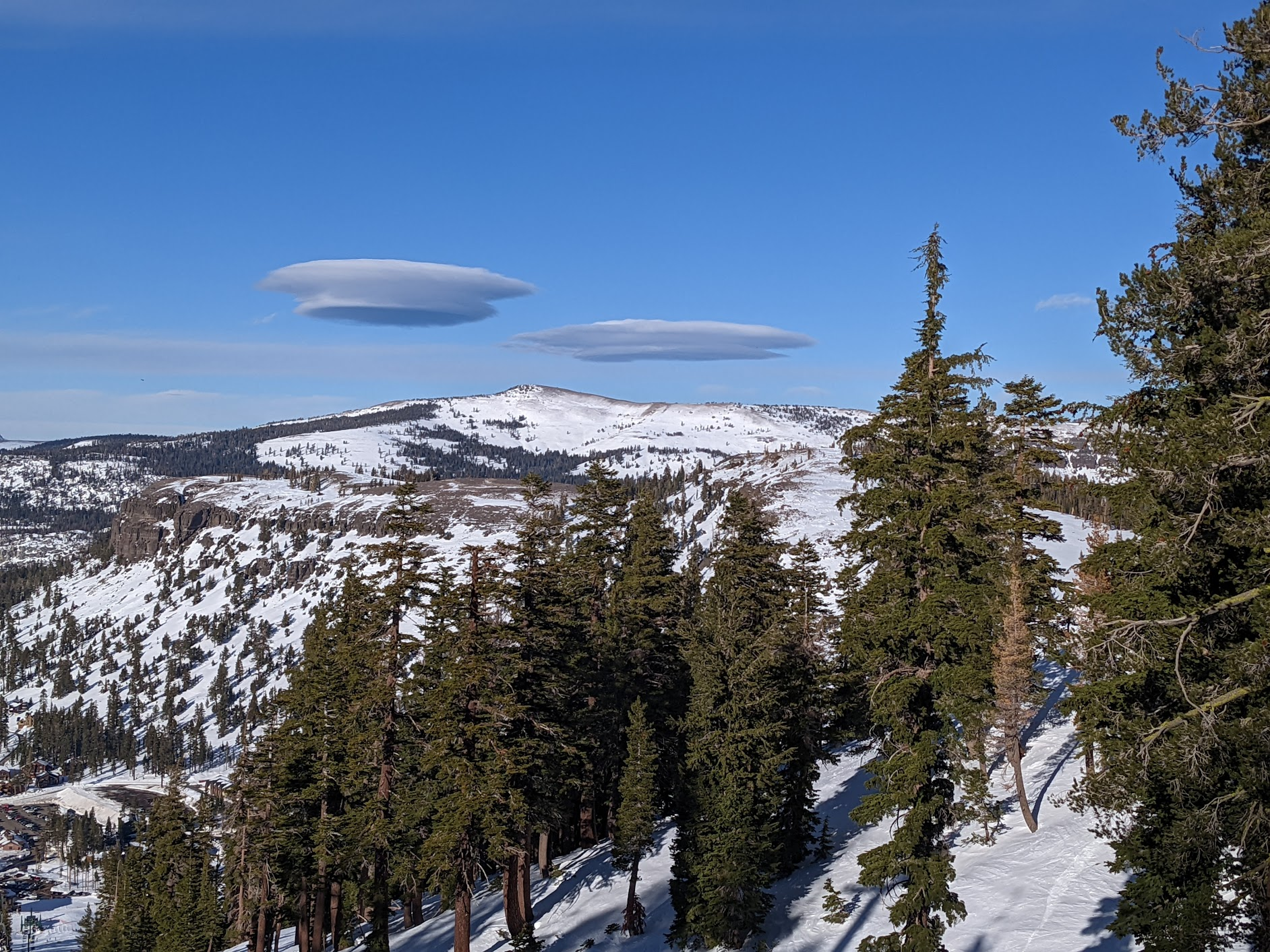
Sierra Wave clouds observed from Kirkwood, CA

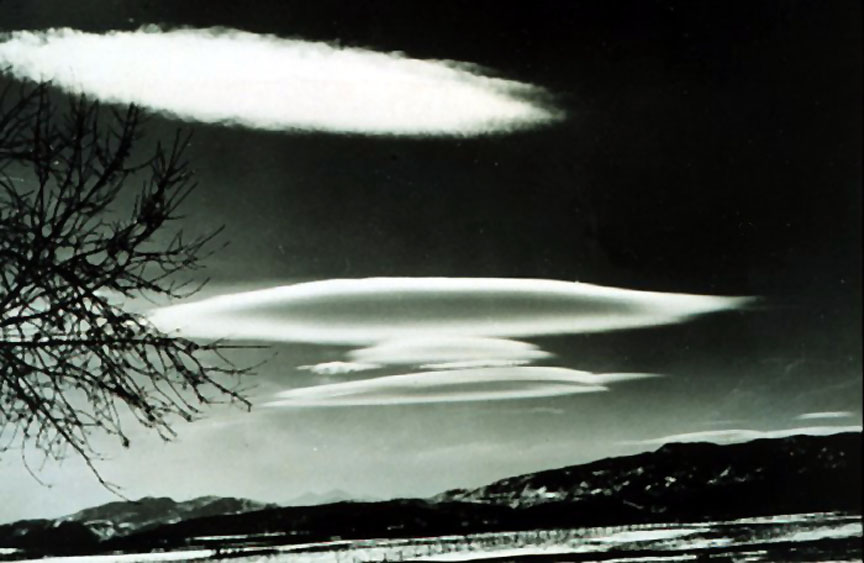
A Sierra Wave over the Sierra Nevada

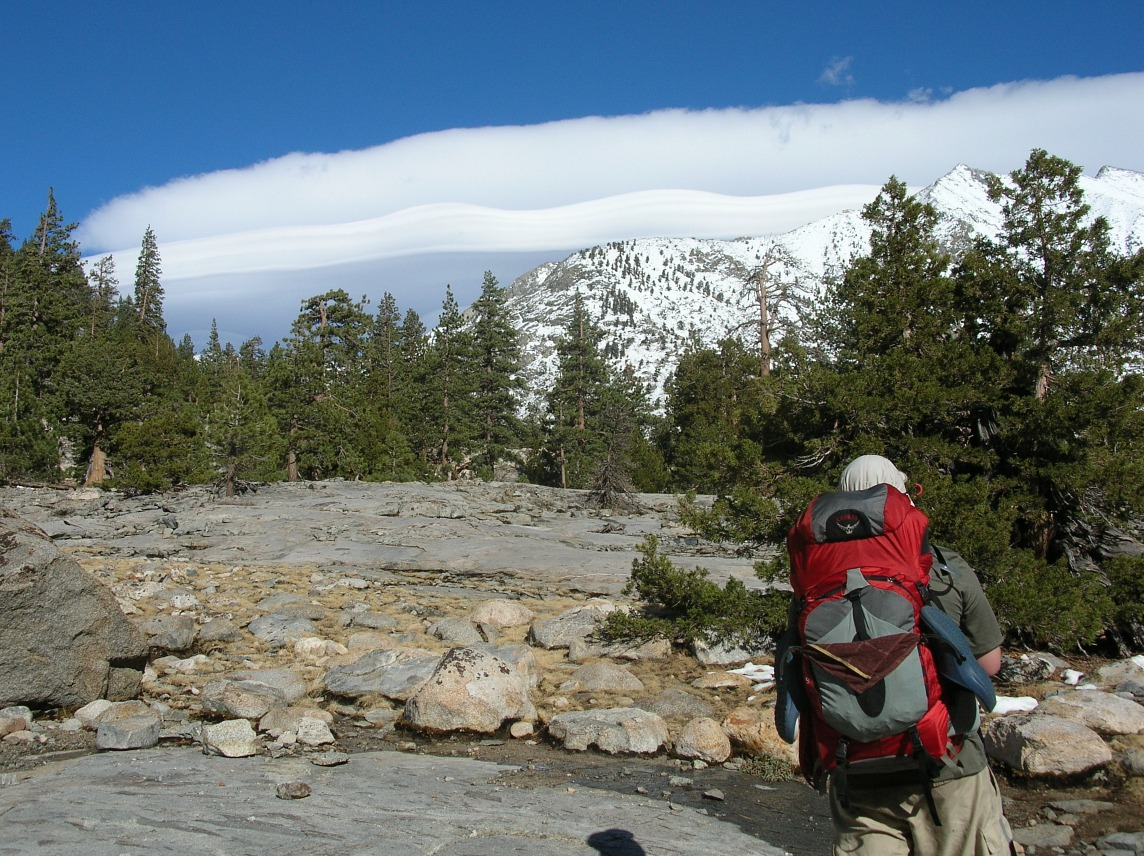
Sierra Wave over eastern edge of King's Canyon NP

The Sierra Wave is a type of air current created by winds that lift off the Sierra Nevada mountain range of California. Known as lee waves, Sierra Waves form as winds hit the Sierra Nevada and are forced to rise, causing water vapor to condense as it cools and forming lenticular clouds on the leeward side of the mountain range. These clouds can remain stationary for many hours. The formation of a Sierra Wave is dependent upon many factors, including wind speed and direction, leeward wind patterns, and water vapor. Given that Sierra Waves are dependent upon many variables their formation is unpredictable. First discovered and studied around 1950, they are used by glider pilots to gain altitude and extend their flights.
