= Tyazhely Sputnik =

Soviet spacecraft intended to explore Venus

- Mission type: Venus impact
- Operator: Soviet Academy of Sciences
- Harvard designation: 1961 Beta 1
- COSPAR ID: 1961-002A
- SATCAT no.: 71
- Mission duration: Launch failure

Spacecraft properties
- Spacecraft: 1VA No.1
- Manufacturer: OKB-1
- BOL mass: 6,483 kilograms (14,293 lb)
- Dry mass: 644 kilograms (1,420 lb)

Start of mission
- Launch date: 4 February 1961, 01:18:03 UTC
- Rocket: Molniya 8K78/L1-6
- Launch site: Baikonur 1/5

End of mission
- Decay date: 26 February 1961

Orbital parameters
- Reference system: Geocentric
- Regime: Low Earth
- Semi-major axis: 6,643 kilometres (4,128 mi)
- Eccentricity: 0.00797
- Perigee altitude: 212 kilometres (132 mi)
- Apogee altitude: 318 kilometres (198 mi)
- Inclination: 64.95 degrees
- Period: 89.8 minutes
- Epoch: 3 February 1961, 20:18:04 UTC

Tyazhely Sputnik (Russian: Тяжёлый Спутник, meaning Heavy Satellite), also known by its development name as Venera 1VA No. 1, and in the West as Sputnik 7, was a Soviet spacecraft, which was intended to be the first spacecraft to explore Venus. Due to a problem with its upper stage it failed to leave low Earth orbit. In order to avoid acknowledging the failure, the Soviet government instead announced that the entire spacecraft, including the upper stage, was a test of a "Heavy Satellite" which would serve as a launch platform for future missions. This resulted in the upper stage being considered a separate spacecraft, from which the probe was "launched", on several subsequent missions.

== History ==
Although Soviet program planners intended for missions to both Mars and Venus on the new 8K78 booster, the effort during 1960 was mainly spent on the former. The Mars 1MV bus could also be used for a Venus probe with some modifications such as heat-insulating foil to protect the probe from hot temperatures in the inner solar system but Earth-based telescopes had already shown that Venus was covered in dense clouds with no visible surface, so photography of the planet would be a waste of time. However, a lander was still possible and the Venus launch window would be at its optimal point in January 1961 while the United States was a long way from attempting any kind of planetary mission yet--Pioneer 5 was intended for a Venus flyby with a launch date in November 1959 but its launch got delayed four months after which the window closed so it was just flown on a deep space data gathering mission instead.

The two Soviet Mars shots in October 1960 failed to reach orbit after which effort shifted to the Venus probes. The Blok L stage of the 8K78 rocket, later known as Molniya, had not gotten a chance to be tested and was still a question mark as nobody had any experience yet starting a rocket engine in space. Testing of the Venus probe at Baikonur began 8 January but just like with the Mars probes the craft developed endless technical issues which were difficult to fix or diagnose as large portions of it had to be taken apart or dismantled to get at various components.

== Launch ==
The booster, vehicle L1-7V, was erected on LC-1 on 1 February. During prelaunch preparations and fueling, a potentially dangerous situation occurred when nitrogen from the probe's orientation system began to bleed out. The memory of the Nedelin catastrophe was still fresh and if the engine valves opened, the Blok L could ignite on the pad, potentially destroying the entire launch vehicle. Pad crews managed to lift the probe on its crane off the stack and turn the power off. It was found out that a slight movement of the probe while being placed on the stack had caused its onboard systems to think it was in space and had separated from the rocket, so it tried to carry out a communication session with the ground. A lock was installed on the probe until it was properly stacked. On 3 February, the roll gyro in the Blok I stage malfunctioned and had to be replaced.

Tyazhely Sputnik was launched at 01:18:03 UTC on 4 February 1961, atop a Molniya 8K78 carrier rocket flying from Site 1/5 at the Baikonur Cosmodrome. The booster steered downrange into the night sky and could be seen for at least minutes. Everything worked perfectly up to the moment of orbital injection. However, tracking ships stationed in the Mediterranean Sea, in the Pacific Ocean, and off West Africa reported no Blok L engine start. The mission was a failure due to a design oversight--the PT-200 DC power transformer that supplied power to the Blok L guidance system failed as it was not designed to operate in a vacuum. It was the largest payload yet launched into space and was a complete failure. TASS officially reported it as a "test payload." An attempt by Soviet air force tracking to search for the probe and Blok L a week later failed to locate it as by that time it had reentered the atmosphere. It re-entered the atmosphere over Siberia on 26 February 1961.

== Aftermath ==
According to the memoirs of Boris Chertok, "A pendant shaped like a small globe with the continents etched on it was placed on the 1VA. Inside this small sphere was a medal depicting the Earth-to-Venus flight path. On the other side of the medal was the emblem of the Soviet Union. The pendant was placed in a spherical capsule with thermal shielding to protect it during entry into Venus' atmosphere at reentry velocity." In what he refers to as a "Strange but True [incident]... in the history of cosmonautics", while the spacecraft was originally thought to have re-entered over the Pacific Ocean, it was subsequently (in 1963) found to have re-entered over Siberia, when this medal made its way back to Chertok by way of his boss, Chief Rocket Designer Sergei Korolev. He relates that "while swimming in a river – a tributary of the Biryusa River in eastern Siberia – a local boy hurt his foot on some sort of piece of iron. When he retrieved it from the water, rather than throw it into deeper water, he brought it home and showed it to his father. The boy’s father, curious as to what the dented metal sphere contained, opened it up and discovered this medal inside… The boy’s father brought his find to the police. The local police delivered the remains of the pendant to the regional department of the KGB, which in turn forwarded it to Moscow. In Moscow the appropriate KGB directorate… after notifying Keldysh as president of the Academy of Sciences", delivered the pendant to Korolev. "Thus, [Chertok] was awarded the medal that had been certified for the flight to Venus by the protocol that [he and Korolev] signed in January 1961. After the launch we were all certain that the Tyazhely Sputnik and the pendant had sunk in the ocean. Now it turned out that it had burned up over Siberia. The pendant had been designed to withstand Venus' atmosphere and therefore it reached the Earth’s surface."

The State Commission met 2 hours after launch with the goal of deciding whether to make the launch public or not. Kamanin's conclusion was to publicize it as, even though it was a failure, it demonstrated the ability for a new rocket, the Molniya, to deliver an 8 tonne thermonuclear warhead anywhere on the planet. Korolev and the others preferred to not make it public in order to prevent speculation that it was a reconnaissance satellite or a failed manned launch. On 5 February 1961, the day after launch, TASS announced the launch of a 'Heavy Satellite', hence the name of 'Tyazhely Sputnik'.

The sister probe, Venera 1, successfully launched on 12 February 1961, 8 days after Tyazhely Sputnik, and was injected into a heliocentric orbit toward Venus, although telemetry on the mission failed a week into flight.

== Scientific instruments ==
- Infrared spectrometer
- Ultraviolet spectrometer
- Micrometeorite detectors
- Two ion traps
- Magnetometer
- Cosmic ray detector

== See also ==
- List of missions to Venus
- Venera program
