= 2001 U.S. Figure Skating Championships =

Figure skating competition

- Type: National championship
- Date: January 14 – 21
- Season: 2000–01
- Location: Boston, Massachusetts
- Host: Skating Club of Boston
- Venue: FleetCenter

Champions
- Men's singles: Timothy Goebel
- Ladies' singles: Michelle Kwan
- Pairs: Kyoko Ina / John Zimmerman
- Ice dance: Naomi Lang / Peter Tchernyshev
- Previous: 2000 U.S. Championships
- Next: 2002 U.S. Championships

The 2001 U.S. Figure Skating Championships took place between January 14 and 21, 2001 at the FleetCenter in Boston, Massachusetts. Medals were awarded in four colors: gold (first), silver (second), bronze (third), and pewter (fourth) in four disciplines – men's singles, ladies' singles, pair skating, and ice dancing – across three levels: senior, junior, and novice.

The event was used to determine the U.S. teams for the 2001 World Championships, 2001 Four Continents Championships, and the 2001 World Junior Championships.

== Competition notes ==
- Frank Carroll coached both the senior men's and senior ladies' champions, the first time one coach had trained two senior champions since Richard Callaghan did it in 1997 with Tara Lipinski and Todd Eldredge. Eldredge placed second here.
- Sibling pairs team Danielle Hartsell / Steve Hartsell were nearly forced to withdraw before the event after he fell on his head during practice. He required 12 stitches, but they went on to win the short program and the bronze medal overall.

== Senior results ==
=== Men ===
Rank	Name	Club	TFP	SP	FS
1	Timothy Goebel	Winterhurst FSC	2.5	3	1
2	Todd Eldredge	Detroit SC	3.0	2	2
3	Matthew Savoie	Illinois Valley FSC	5.5	5	3
4	Michael Weiss	Washington FSC	5.5	1	5
5	Trifun Zivanovic	All Year FSC	6.0	4	4
6	Johnny Weir	Univ. of Delaware FSC	9.0	6	6
7	Justin Dillon	St. Moritz ISC	11.5	9	7
8	Ryan Jahnke	Broadmoor SC	11.5	7	8
9	Ryan Bradley	Broadmoor SC	14.0	8	10
10	Derrick Delmore	Washington FSC	14.5	11	9
11	Danny Clausen	St. Paul FSC	17.0	10	12
12	Evan Lysacek	DuPage FSC	18.5	15	11
13	Kurt Fromknecht	Westminster FSC of Erie	19.5	13	13
14	Joshua Figurido	The SC of Boston	20.0	12	14
15	Braden Overett	Denver FSC	23.5	17	15
16	Don Baldwin	Los Angeles FSC	24.0	16	16
17	Johnnie Bevan	Spokane FSC	24.0	14	17
18	Scott Smith	The Gardens FSC of MD	27.0	18	18
19	Robert Brathwaite	All Year FSC	28.5	19	19

=== Ladies ===
Rank	Name	Club	TFP	SP	FS
1	Michelle Kwan	Los Angeles FSC	1.5	1	1
2	Sarah Hughes	The SC of New York	3.0	2	2
3	Angela Nikodinov	All Year FSC	4.5	3	3
4	Jennifer Kirk	The SC of Boston	6.0	4	4
5	Amber Corwin	All Year FSC	7.5	5	5
6	Beatrisa Liang	All Year FSC	9.0	6	6
7	Ann Patrice McDonough	Broadmoor SC	11.0	8	7
8	Andrea Gardiner	Houston FSC	13.5	9	9
9	Sara Wheat	Univ. of Delaware FSC	14.0	12	8
10	Ye Bin Mok	Los Angeles FSC	15.5	11	10
11	Lisa Nesuda	Dallas FSC	16.0	10	11
12	Alicia Cavanaugh	New England FSC	18.5	13	12
13	Stacey Pensgen	Genesee FSC	18.5	7	15
14	Katie Lee	St. Paul FSC	20.0	14	13
15	Stephanie Chace-Bass	Los Angeles FSC	21.5	15	14
16	Stephanie Roth	The SC of New York	24.5	17	16
WD	Elizabeth Kwon	SC of Northern VA		16	
WD	Sasha Cohen	Orange County FSC			
WD	Naomi Nari Nam	All Year FSC			

=== Pairs ===
Rank	Name	Club	Fact. Places	SP	FS
1	Kyoko Ina / John Zimmerman	The SC of New York / Birmingham FSC	2.0	2	1
2	Tiffany Scott / Philip Dulebohn	Colonial FSC / Univ.of Delaware FSC	3.5	3	2
3	Danielle Hartsell / Steve Hartsell	Detroit SC	3.5	1	3
4	Stephanie Kalesavich / Aaron Parchem	Detroit SC	6.5	5	4
5	Amanda Magarian / Jered Guzman	Broadmoor SC / Los Angeles FSC	8.0	6	5
6	Laura Handy / Jonathon Hunt	Univ. of Delaware FSC	8.0	4	6
7	Jessica Miller / Jeffrey Weiss	Northern Kentucky SC / Peninsula SC	11.0	8	7
8	Sima Ganaba / Amir Ganaba	Los Angeles FSC	13.5	11	8
9	Larisa Spielberg / Craig Joeright	Detroit SC	13.5	9	9
10	Molly Quigley / Bert Cording	Nashville FSC	15.0	10	10
11	Rena Inoue / John Baldwin, Jr.	All Year FSC	17.5	13	11
12	Lindsay Rogeness / Brian Rogeness	Los Angeles FSC	19.0	14	12
13	Stephanie Woodman / James Peterson	University of Delaware FSC / Lakewood Winter Club	19.0	12	13
WD	Tiffany Stiegler / Johnnie Stiegler	Los Angeles FSC		7	
WD	Po Hayes / Richard Gillam	Atlanta FSC / Los Angeles FSC		15	

=== Ice dancing ===
Rank	Name	Club	TFP	CD1	CD2	OD	FD
1	Naomi Lang / Peter Tchernyshev	American Academy FSC	2.0	1	1	1	1
2	Tanith Belbin / Benjamin Agosto	Detroit SC	4.8	4	4	2	2
3	Jessica Joseph / Brandon Forsyth	Detroit SC / The SC of Boston	6.6	3	3	4	3
4	Beata Handra / Charles Sinek	Santa Rosa FSC / The SC of New York	6.6	2	2	3	4
5	Jesica Valentine / Matthew Kossack	The SC of Boston	10.2	6	5	5	5
6	Kimberly Navarro / Robert Shmalo	Santa Rosa FSC / Queen City FSC	12.2	7	6	6	6
7	Caitlin Obremski / Jonathan Magalnick	Washington FSC / Coyotes SC of AZ	14.2	8	7	7	7
WD	Deborah Koegel / Oleg Fediukov	IceWorks SC		5			

== Junior results ==
=== Men ===
Rank	Name	Club	TFP	SP	FS
1	Parker Pennington	Winterhurst FSC	2.5	3	1
2	Benjamin Miller	St. Paul FSC	2.5	1	2
3	Michael Villarreal	Arctic Blades FSC	4.0	2	3
4	Shaun Rogers	Univ. of Delaware FSC	6.5	5	4
5	Rusty Fein	Washington FSC	8.0	4	6
6	Rohene Ward	Starlight Ice Dance Club	8.5	7	5
7	Nicholas LaRoche	Colonial FSC	11.0	6	8
8	Michael Sasaki	South Bay FSC	11.5	9	7
9	Dennis Phan	Los Angeles FSC	14.0	10	9
10	Pierre Balian	All Year FSC	14.0	8	10
11	Sam-Tyler Dafoe	Dallas FSC	16.5	11	11
12	Mauro Bruni	Windy Hill SC	18.0	12	12

=== Ladies ===
Rank	Name	Club	TFP	SP	FS
1	Joan Cristobal	Peninsula SC	2.5	1	2
2	Alissa Czisny	St. Clair Shores FSC	3.5	5	1
3	Lindsey Weber	Detroit SC	4.0	2	3
4	Colette Irving	The SC of Boston	5.5	3	4
5	Amber Czisny	St. Clair Shores FSC	8.0	4	6
6	Louann Donovan	The SC of Boston	9.5	9	5
7	Jordana Blesa	Los Angeles FSC	10.5	7	7
8	Amanda Fritz	SC of Mt Lebanon	12.0	8	8
9	Lindsey Berg	Broadmoor SC	13.0	6	10
10	Joanna Glick	The SC of New York	14.0	10	9
11	Kailee Watson	Los Angeles FSC	17.0	12	11
12	Erica Aden	Tri-Cities FSC	17.5	11	12
13	Katie Mulvaney	Utah FSC	19.5	13	13

=== Pairs ===
Rank	Name	Club	TFP	SP	FS
1	Deborah Blinder / Jeremy Allen	Univ. of Delaware FSC	1.5	1	1
2	Kristen Roth / Michael McPherson	Detroit SC	3.0	2	2
3	Brandilyn Sandoval / Derek Trent	Broadmoor SC	4.5	3	3
4	Christen Dean / Joshua Murphy	American Academy FSC	6.0	4	4
5	Emma Phibbs / Devin Patrick	Washington FSC / Orange County FSC	7.5	5	5
6	Terese Anselmi / Michael Adler	Detroit SC	9.0	6	6
7	Alexis Hoffstadter / Lucas Vriner	DuPage FSC	11.0	8	7
8	Marcy Hinzmann / Ronnie Biancosino	Winterhurst FSC / Univ. of Delaware FSC	11.5	7	8
9	Christie Baca / Scott Smith	Orange County FSC / Glacier Falls FSC	13.5	9	9
10	Briana McInerney / Joseph Jorgens	The SC of New York / Washington FSC	15.0	10	10
11	Brooke Kayland / Yevgeniy Shvetsov	Los Angeles FSC / Van Nuys FSC	16.5	11	11

=== Ice dancing ===
Rank	Name	Club	TFP	CD1	CD2	OD	FD
1	Lydia Manon / Michel Klus	Detroit SC	2.2	2	1	1	1
2	Kendra Goodwin / Chris Obzansky	SC of Morris NJ / Univ. of Delaware FSC	4.0	1	3	2	2
3	Kakani Young / Ikaika Young	Seattle SC	5.8	3	2	3	3
4	Melissa Ralph / Ryan O'Meara	Detroit SC / Coyotes SC of AZ	8.0	4	4	4	4
5	Loren Galler-Rabinowitz / David Mitchell	The SC of Boston	10.0	5	5	5	5
6	Kirsten Frisch / Brent Bommentre	SC of Morris NJ / Wissahickon SC	12.0	6	6	6	6
7	Laura Smith / Andrew Smith	Los Angeles FSC	14.2	7	8	7	7
8	Brittany May / Yuri Antonov	Winterhurst FSC / The Gardens FSC of MD	16.0	9	7	8	8
9	Lia Nitake / Ian Ross-Frye	All Year FSC / Wissahickon SC	17.8	8	9	9	9
10	Laura Munana / Luke Munana	Palomares FSC / Peninsula SC	20.0	10	10	10	10
11	Janna Napier / Peter Kimzey	Lone Star FSC / Arctic Blades FSC	22.0	11	11	11	11
12	Kimberly Cole / Dylan Roseberry	St. Paul FSC / Denver FSC	24.0	12	12	12	12

== International team selections ==
=== World Championships ===
	Men	Ladies	Pairs	Ice dancing
1	Timothy Goebel	Michelle Kwan	Kyoko Ina / John Zimmerman	Naomi Lang / Peter Tchernyshev
2	Todd Eldredge	Sarah Hughes	Tiffany Scott / Philip Dulebohn	Tanith Belbin / Benjamin Agosto
3		Angela Nikodinov		

=== Four Continents Championships ===
	Men	Ladies	Pairs	Ice dancing
1	Todd Eldredge	Michelle Kwan	Kyoko Ina / John Zimmerman	Naomi Lang / Peter Tchernyshev
2	Matthew Savoie	Sarah Hughes	Tiffany Scott / Philip Dulebohn	Tanith Belbin / Benjamin Agosto
3	Michael Weiss	Angela Nikodinov	Steve Hartsell / Danielle Hartsell	Jessica Joseph / Brandon Forsyth
1st alternate		Jennifer Kirk		
2nd alternate		Amber Corwin		

=== World Junior Championships ===
	Men	Ladies	Pairs	Ice dancing
1	Johnny Weir	Ann Patrice McDonough	Deborah Blinder / Jeremy Allen	Tanith Belbin / Benjamin Agosto
2	Ryan Bradley	Sara Wheat	Kristen Roth / Michael McPherson	Lydia Manon / Michel Klus
3	Parker Pennington	Ye Bin Mok		Kendra Goodwin / Chris Obzansky
1st alternate	Benjamin Miller			
2nd alternate	Evan Lysacek			
