= 2004 U.S. Figure Skating Championships =

Figure skating competition

- Type: National Championship
- Date: January 3 – 11
- Season: 2003–04
- Location: Atlanta, Georgia
- Venue: Philips Arena

Champions
- Men's singles: Johnny Weir
- Ladies' singles: Michelle Kwan
- Pairs: Rena Inoue / John Baldwin
- Ice dance: Tanith Belbin / Benjamin Agosto
- Previous: 2003 U.S. Championships
- Next: 2005 U.S. Championships

The 2004 U.S. Figure Skating Championships took place on January 3–11, 2004 at the Philips Arena in Atlanta, Georgia. Medals were awarded in four colors: gold (first), silver (second), bronze (third), and pewter (fourth) in four disciplines – men's singles, ladies' singles, pair skating, and ice dancing – across three levels: senior, junior, and novice.

The event was among the criteria used to select the U.S. teams for the 2004 World Championships, 2004 Four Continents Championships, and the 2004 World Figure Skating Championships.

== Senior results ==
=== Men ===
| Rank | Name | TFP | SP | FS |
|---|---|---|---|---|
| 1 | Johnny Weir | 1.5 | 1 | 1 |
| 2 | Michael Weiss | 4.0 | 4 | 2 |
| 3 | Matthew Savoie | 5.0 | 2 | 4 |
| 4 | Ryan Jahnke | 6.0 | 6 | 3 |
| 5 | Evan Lysacek | 6.5 | 3 | 5 |
| 6 | Ryan Bradley | 8.5 | 5 | 6 |
| 7 | Braden Overett | 11.5 | 9 | 7 |
| 8 | Derrick Delmore | 12.0 | 8 | 8 |
| 9 | Scott Smith | 13.5 | 7 | 10 |
| 10 | Jordan Brauninger | 15.0 | 12 | 9 |
| 11 | Justin Dillon | 18.0 | 14 | 11 |
| 12 | Nicholas LaRoche | 18.5 | 13 | 12 |
| 13 | Matthew Lind | 18.5 | 11 | 13 |
| 14 | Dennis Phan | 21.5 | 15 | 14 |
| 15 | Jordan Wilson | 24.5 | 19 | 15 |
| 16 | Rohene Ward | 25.0 | 16 | 17 |
| 17 | Mauro Bruni | 26.0 | 20 | 16 |
| 18 | Daniel Lee | 28.5 | 21 | 18 |
| 19 | Benjamin Miller | 29.0 | 18 | 20 |
| 20 | Michael Villarreal | 30.0 | 22 | 19 |
| WD | Timothy Goebel | | 10 | |
| WD | Parker Pennington | | 17 | |

=== Ladies ===
| Rank | Name | TFP | SP | FS |
|---|---|---|---|---|
| 1 | Michelle Kwan | 2.0 | 2 | 1 |
| 2 | Sasha Cohen | 2.5 | 1 | 2 |
| 3 | Jennifer Kirk | 4.5 | 3 | 3 |
| 4 | Amber Corwin | 6.5 | 5 | 4 |
| 5 | Angela Nikodinov | 7.0 | 4 | 5 |
| 6 | Ann Patrice McDonough | 9.0 | 6 | 6 |
| 7 | Beatrisa Liang | 10.5 | 7 | 7 |
| 8 | Jennifer Don | 12.5 | 9 | 8 |
| 9 | Jane Bugaeva | 15.5 | 11 | 10 |
| 10 | Danielle Kahle | 16.0 | 14 | 9 |
| 11 | Alexandra Patterson | 16.0 | 10 | 11 |
| 12 | Alissa Czisny | 19.0 | 8 | 15 |
| 13 | Stephanie Rosenthal | 19.5 | 15 | 12 |
| 14 | Andrea Gardiner | 19.5 | 13 | 13 |
| 15 | Aanya Reiten | 20.0 | 12 | 14 |
| 16 | Louann Donovan | 25.0 | 16 | 17 |
| 17 | Natalie Mecher | 25.5 | 19 | 16 |
| 18 | Suzy McDonald | 27.0 | 18 | 18 |
| 19 | Erica Archambault | 29.0 | 20 | 19 |
| 20 | Felicia Beck | 30.5 | 21 | 20 |
| WD | Yebin Mok | | 17 | |

=== Pairs ===
| Rank | Name | TFP | SP | FS |
|---|---|---|---|---|
| 1 | Rena Inoue / John Baldwin | 2.0 | 2 | 1 |
| 2 | Kathryn Orscher / Garrett Lucash | 3.5 | 3 | 2 |
| 3 | Tiffany Scott / Philip Dulebohn | 3.5 | 1 | 3 |
| 4 | Jennifer Don / Jonathon Hunt | 6.0 | 4 | 4 |
| 5 | Laura Handy / Jeremy Allen | 7.5 | 5 | 5 |
| 6 | Larisa Spielberg / Craig Joeright | 10.5 | 9 | 6 |
| 7 | Marcy Hinzmann / Aaron Parchem | 10.5 | 7 | 7 |
| 8 | Brittany Vise / Nicholas Kole | 11.0 | 6 | 8 |
| 9 | Tiffany Stiegler / Bert Cording | 13.0 | 8 | 9 |
| 10 | Amanda Evora / Mark Ladwig | 15.0 | 10 | 10 |
| 11 | Emma Phibbs / Michael McPherson | 16.5 | 11 | 11 |
| 12 | Kristen Roth / Steve Hartsell | 18.0 | 12 | 12 |
| 13 | Tiffany Vise / Derek Trent | 19.5 | 13 | 13 |
| 14 | Tiffany Sfikas / Jeffrey Weiss | 22.0 | 16 | 14 |
| 15 | Colette Appel / Lee Harris | 22.0 | 14 | 15 |
| 16 | Brandi Sandoval / Laureano Ibarra | 24.5 | 17 | 16 |
| 17 | Amy Howerton / Steven Pottenger | 24.5 | 15 | 17 |
| 18 | Janice Mayne / Michael Modro | 27.0 | 18 | 18 |
| 19 | Jacqueline Matson / Jason Heffron | 28.5 | 19 | 19 |
| 20 | Lindsay Rogeness / Brian Rogeness | 30.0 | 20 | 20 |

=== Ice dancing ===
| Rank | Name | TFP | CD | OD | FD |
|---|---|---|---|---|---|
| 1 | Tanith Belbin / Benjamin Agosto | 2.0 | 1 | 1 | 1 |
| 2 | Melissa Gregory / Denis Petukhov | 4.4 | 3 | 2 | 2 |
| 3 | Loren Galler-Rabinowitz / David Mitchell | 6.4 | 4 | 3 | 3 |
| 4 | Kendra Goodwin / Brent Bommentre | 8.8 | 6 | 4 | 4 |
| 5 | Christie Moxley / Aleksandre Kirsanov | 10.0 | 5 | 5 | 5 |
| 6 | Lydia Manon / Ryan O'Meara | 12.8 | 8 | 6 | 6 |
| 7 | Hilary Gibbons / Justin Pekarek | 14.0 | 7 | 7 | 7 |
| 8 | Julia Rey / Philipp Rey | 16.4 | 9 | 8 | 8 |
| 9 | Rebecca Magerovskiy / Sergey Magerovskiy | 18.4 | 10 | 9 | 9 |
| 10 | Laura Munana / Luke Munana | 20.4 | 11 | 10 | 10 |
| 11 | Alexandra Snyder / Nick Traxler | 22.4 | 12 | 11 | 11 |
| WD | Naomi Lang / Peter Tchernyshev | | 2 | | |

== Junior results ==
=== Men ===
| Rank | Name | TFP | SP | FS |
|---|---|---|---|---|
| 1 | Christopher Toland | 3.5 | 3 | 2 |
| 2 | Jason Wong | 4.0 | 6 | 1 |
| 3 | Wesley Campbell | 5.0 | 4 | 3 |
| 4 | Tommy Steenberg | 8.0 | 2 | 7 |
| 5 | Traighe Rouse | 8.5 | 7 | 5 |
| 6 | Ben Woolwine | 8.5 | 5 | 6 |
| 7 | Jeremy Abbott | 9.0 | 10 | 4 |
| 8 | Igor Macypura | 9.5 | 1 | 9 |
| 9 | Tim Wright | 12.0 | 8 | 8 |
| 10 | Adam Aronowitz | 15.5 | 11 | 10 |
| 11 | Michael Peters | 15.5 | 9 | 11 |
| 12 | David Sanders | 18.0 | 12 | 12 |

=== Ladies ===
| Rank | Name | TFP | SP | FS |
|---|---|---|---|---|
| 1 | Kimmie Meissner | 2.0 | 2 | 1 |
| 2 | Katy Taylor | 2.5 | 1 | 2 |
| 3 | Brianna Perry | 5.5 | 5 | 3 |
| 4 | Erin Reed | 7.0 | 6 | 4 |
| 5 | Shanell Noji | 7.0 | 4 | 5 |
| 6 | Julian Burns | 7.5 | 3 | 6 |
| 7 | Jessica Houston | 10.5 | 7 | 7 |
| 8 | Michelle Boulos | 12.0 | 8 | 8 |
| 9 | Melissa Telecky | 15.0 | 12 | 9 |
| 10 | Lauren Hennessy | 15.5 | 9 | 11 |
| 11 | Amanda Adelson | 16.5 | 13 | 10 |
| 12 | Katie Thordarson | 17.5 | 11 | 12 |
| 13 | Tammy Sutan | 18.0 | 10 | 13 |

=== Pairs ===
| Rank | Name | TFP | SP | FS |
|---|---|---|---|---|
| 1 | Shantel Jordan / Jeremy Barrett | 2.5 | 3 | 1 |
| 2 | Brooke Castile / Benjamin Okolski | 2.5 | 1 | 2 |
| 3 | Andrea Varraux / David Pelletier | 4.0 | 2 | 3 |
| 4 | Sydney Schmidt / Christopher Pottenger | 6.0 | 4 | 4 |
| 5 | Jenna Yount / Grant Marron | 8.5 | 7 | 5 |
| 6 | Lucy Galleher / John Coughlin | 8.5 | 5 | 6 |
| 7 | Katelyn Uhlig / Colin Loomis | 11.0 | 8 | 7 |
| 8 | Lindsey Seitz / Andy Seitz | 11.0 | 6 | 8 |
| 9 | Sheila Harkaway / Cole Davis | 14.0 | 10 | 9 |
| 10 | Katie Boxwell / Joshua Murphy | 14.5 | 9 | 10 |
| 11 | Tanya Bakerman / Chad Brennan | 17.0 | 12 | 11 |
| 12 | Rhea Sy / Benny Wu | 17.5 | 11 | 12 |
| 13 | Joanna Canny / Adam Parr | 19.5 | 13 | 13 |

=== Ice dancing ===
| Rank | Name | TFP | CD1 | CD2 | OD | FD |
|---|---|---|---|---|---|---|
| 1 | Morgan Matthews / Maxim Zavozin | 2.0 | 1 | 1 | 1 | 1 |
| 2 | Meryl Davis / Charlie White | 4.0 | 2 | 2 | 2 | 2 |
| 3 | Trina Pratt / Todd Gilles | 6.0 | 3 | 3 | 3 | 3 |
| 4 | Kirsten Frisch / Augie Hill | 8.0 | 4 | 4 | 4 | 4 |
| 5 | Meghan McCullough / Joel Dear | 11.0 | 5 | 5 | 5 | 6 |
| 6 | Carly Donowick / Leo Ungar | 11.4 | 7 | 7 | 6 | 5 |
| 7 | Victoria Devins / Kevin O'Keefe | 13.6 | 6 | 6 | 7 | 7 |
| 8 | Mimi Whetstone / Benjamin Cohen | 16.0 | 8 | 8 | 8 | 8 |
| 9 | Samantha Cepican / Phillip Lichtor | 18.2 | 10 | 9 | 9 | 9 |
| 10 | Alisa Allapach / Benjaman Westenberger | 20.6 | 12 | 11 | 10 | 10 |
| 11 | Caitlin Mallory / Brent Holdburg | 22.8 | 13 | 13 | 11 | 11 |
| 12 | Katherine Copely / Duke Wensel | 23.8 | 11 | 12 | 12 | 12 |
| WD | Sarah Solomon / Andrew Smith | | 9 | 10 | | |

== International team selections ==
=== World Championships ===
| | Men | Ladies | Pairs | Ice dancing |
|---|---|---|---|---|
| 1 | Johnny Weir | Michelle Kwan | Rena Inoue / John Baldwin | Tanith Belbin / Benjamin Agosto |
| 2 | Michael Weiss | Sasha Cohen | Katie Orscher / Garrett Lucash | Melissa Gregory / Denis Petukhov |
| 3 | Matt Savoie | Jennifer Kirk | | |
| 1st alternate | Ryan Jahnke | Amber Corwin | Tiffany Scott / Philip Dulebohn | Loren Galler-Rabinowitz / David Mitchell |
| 2nd alternate | Evan Lysacek | Angela Nikodinov | Jennifer Don / Jonathon Hunt | Kendra Goodwin / Brent Bommentre |
| 3rd alternate | Ryan Bradley | Ann Patrice McDonough | Laura Handy / Jeremy Allen | Christie Moxley / Aleksandr Kirsanov |

=== Four Continents Championships ===
| | Men | Ladies | Pairs | Ice dancing |
|---|---|---|---|---|
| 1 | Johnny Weir | Jennifer Kirk | Rena Inoue / John Baldwin | Tanith Belbin / Benjamin Agosto |
| 2 | Ryan Jahnke | Amber Corwin | Katie Orscher / Garrett Lucash | Melissa Gregory / Denis Petukhov |
| 3 | Evan Lysacek | Angela Nikodinov | Tiffany Scott / Philip Dulebohn | Loren Galler-Rabinowitz / David Mitchell |
| 1st alternate | Ryan Bradley | Ann Patrice McDonough | Jennifer Don / Jonathon Hunt | Kendra Goodwin / Brent Bommentre |
| 2nd alternate | Braden Overett | Jennifer Don | Laura Handy / Jeremy Allen | Christie Moxley / Aleksandr Kirsanov |
| 3rd alternate | Derrick Delmore | Jane Bugaeva | Larisa Spielberg / Craig Joeright | Lydia Manon / Ryan O'Meara |

=== World Junior Championships ===
| | Men | Ladies | Pairs | Ice dancing |
|---|---|---|---|---|
| 1 | Evan Lysacek | Beatrisa Liang | Brittany Vise / Nicholas Kole | Morgan Matthews / Maxim Zavozin |
| 2 | Jordan Brauninger | Kimmie Meissner | Brooke Castile / Ben Okolski | Meryl Davis / Charlie White |
| 3 | Dennis Phan | Katy Taylor | Andrea Varraux / David Pelletier | |
| 1st alternate | Christopher Toland | Danielle Kahle | Emma Phibbs / Michael McPherson | Trina Pratt / Todd Gilles |
| 2nd alternate | Jason Wong | Jennifer Don | Brandi Sandoval / Larry Ibarra | Kirsten Frisch / Augie Hill |
| 3rd alternate | Wesley Campbell | Jane Bugaeva | Sydney Schmidt / Christopher Pottenger | Carly Donowick / Leo Ungar |

=== Triglav Trophy ===
| | Junior men | Junior ladies | Junior pairs | Novice men | Novice ladies |
|---|---|---|---|---|---|
| 1 | Stephen Carriere | Danielle Shepard | Mariel Miller / Rockne Brubaker | Daisuke Murakami | Cara Kinney |
| 2 | Douglas Razzano | | Lindsey Seitz / Andy Seitz | | Megan Oster |

=== Gardena Spring Trophy ===
| | Junior men | Junior ladies |
|---|---|---|
| 1 | Princeton Kwong | Erin Reed |
| 2 | Traighe Rouse | Christine Zukowski |
