= 2003 U.S. Figure Skating Championships =

Figure skating competition

- Type: National championships
- Date: January 12 – 19
- Season: 2002–03
- Location: Dallas, Texas
- Host: U.S. Figure Skating
- Venue: American Airlines Center

Champions
- Men's singles: Michael Weiss (Senior) & Dennis Phan (Junior)
- Women's singles: Michelle Kwan (Senior) & Erica Archambault (Junior)
- Pairs: Tiffany Scott and Philip Dulebohn (Senior) & Amy Howerton and Steven Pottenger (Junior)
- Ice dance: Naomi Lang and Peter Tchernyshev (Senior) & Morgan Matthews and Maxim Zavozin (Junior)
- Previous: 2002 U.S. Championships
- Next: 2004 U.S. Championships

The 2003 U.S. Figure Skating Championships were held from January 12 to 19, 2003, at the American Airlines Center in Dallas, Texas. Medals were awarded in men's singles, women's singles, pair skating, and ice dance at the senior, junior, and novice levels. The results were part of the U.S. selection criteria for the 2003 World Championships, 2003 Four Continents Championships, and 2003 World Junior Championships. At the senior level, Michael Weiss won the men's event, Michelle Kwan won the women's event, Tiffany Scott and Philip Dulebohn won the pairs event, and Naomi Lang and Peter Tchernyshev won the ice dance event. Kwan's victory was her seventh at the U.S. Figure Skating Championships, and her sixth consecutive win. At the junior level, Dennis Phan won the men's event, Erica Archambault won the women's event, Amy Howerton and Steven Pottenger won the pairs event, and Morgan Matthews and Maxim Zavozin won the ice dance event.

Michael Weiss won his third national title after a men's competition that was described as a circus. Weiss fell on his quadruple Lutz and failed to perform a triple Axel. Timothy Goebel – nicknamed the "Quad King" for his prowess with quadruple jumps – failed to successfully perform any of his quadruple jumps. Johnny Weir withdrew from the competition midway through the free skate after colliding with the wall and injuring his knee. Matthew Savoie was forced to pause his performance by a referee when part of his costume broke. "I've never seen anything like it in my fifty years in skating," coach Don Laws said afterward, summing up the men's event.

== Senior results ==
=== Men's singles ===
Men's results
Rank	Skater	Total	SP	FS
1st place, gold medalist(s)	Michael Weiss	3.0	4	1
2nd place, silver medalist(s)	Timothy Goebel	3.5	1	3
3rd place, bronze medalist(s)	Ryan Jahnke	5.0	6	2
4	Scott Smith	6.5	5	4
5	Matthew Savoie	7.5	3	6
6	Parker Pennington	8.5	7	5
7	Evan Lysacek	11.5	9	7
8	Nicholas LaRoche	12.0	8	8
9	Ryan Bradley	16.5	15	9
10	Braden Overett	17.0	14	10
11	Michael Villarreal	17.5	13	11
12	Danny Clausen	17.5	11	12
13	Benjamin Miller	18.0	10	13
14	Jordan Wilson	23.0	18	14
15	Kurt Fromknecht	23.0	16	15
16	Shaun Rogers	25.5	19	16
WD	Johnny Weir	Withdrew	2	Withdrew from competition
WD	Derrick Delmore	Withdrew	12	Withdrew from competition
WD	Shepherd Clark	Withdrew	17	Withdrew from competition

=== Women's singles ===
Women's results
Rank	Skater	Total	SP	FS
1st place, gold medalist(s)	Michelle Kwan	1.5	1	1
2nd place, silver medalist(s)	Sarah Hughes	3.5	3	2
3rd place, bronze medalist(s)	Sasha Cohen	4.0	2	3
4	Ann Patrice McDonough	7.0	6	4
5	Jennifer Kirk	7.0	4	5
6	Yebin Mok	8.5	5	6
7	Beatrisa Liang	11.0	8	7
8	Amber Corwin	11.5	7	8
9	Louann Donovan	13.5	9	9
10	Alissa Czisny	16.0	14	9
11	Jennifer Don	16.0	10	11
12	Andrea Gardiner	18.5	13	12
13	Lindsey Weber	19.0	12	13
14	Kim Ryan	22.0	16	14
15	Joan Cristobal	25.0	18	16
16	Kailee Watson	25.5	21	15
17	Patricia Mansfield	27.0	20	17
18	Krissa Miller	27.5	19	18
19	Kelsey Drewel	27.5	17	19
20	Amber Czisny	27.5	15	20
WD	Angela Nikodinov	Withdrew	11	Withdrew from competition

=== Pairs ===
Pairs results
Rank	Team	Total	SP	FS
1st place, gold medalist(s)	Tiffany Scott; Philip Dulebohn	1.5	1	1
2nd place, silver medalist(s)	Kathryn Orscher; Garrett Lucash	4.0	4	2
3rd place, bronze medalist(s)	Rena Inoue; John Baldwin	5.5	5	3
4	Larisa Spielberg; Craig Joeright	5.5	3	4
5	Stephanie Kalesavich; Aaron Parchem	6.0	2	5
6	Jennifer Don; Jonathon Hunt	9.0	6	6
7	Laura Handy; Jeremy Allen	11.5	9	7
8	Tiffany Stiegler; Johnnie Stiegler	12.0	8	8
9	Marcy Hinzmann; Steve Hartsell	12.5	7	9
10	Kristen Roth; Michael McPherson	16.0	12	10
11	Tiffany Vise; Laureano Ibarra	16.0	10	11
12	Amanda Evora; Mark Ladwig	17.5	11	12
13	Emma Phibbs; Devin Patrick	19.0	13	13
14	Stacey Pensgen; Derek Trent	21.0	14	14
15	Lindsay Rogeness; Brian Rogeness	23.0	16	15
16	Jacqueline Matson; Don Baldwin	23.5	15	16

=== Ice dance ===
Ice dance results
Rank	Team	Total	C1	C2	OD	FD
1st place, gold medalist(s)	Naomi Lang; Peter Tchernyshev	2.6	1	1	2	1
2nd place, silver medalist(s)	Tanith Belbin; Benjamin Agosto	3.4	2	2	1	2
3rd place, bronze medalist(s)	Melissa Gregory; Denis Petukhov	6.0	3	3	3	3
4	Loren Galler-Rabinowitz; David Mitchell	8.0	4	4	4	4
5	Emilie Nussear; Mathew Gates	12.0	6	9	5	6
6	Christie Moxley; Aleksandre Kirsanov	12.6	5	5	6	7
7	Kimberly Navarro; Robert Shmalo	14.0	10	10	8	5
8	Kendra Goodwin; Chris Obzansky	14.8	7	6	7	8
9	Hilary Gibbons; Justin Pekarek	17.4	8	7	9	9
10	Lydia Manon; Vitaliy Shalin	19.4	9	8	10	10
11	Christina Zepeda; Nicholas Hart	22.0	11	11	11	11
12	Eleanor Langhans; Ian Ross-Frye	24.0	12	12	12	12

== Junior results ==
=== Men's singles ===
Men's results
Rank	Skater	Total	SP	FS
1st place, gold medalist(s)	Dennis Phan	2.0	2	1
2nd place, silver medalist(s)	Jordan Brauninger	2.5	1	2
3rd place, bronze medalist(s)	Adam Aronowitz	5.5	5	3
4	Christopher Toland	5.5	3	4
5	Jason Wong	6.0	4	5
6	Wesley Campbell	9.0	6	6
7	Mauro Bruni	10.5	7	7
8	Dustin Brinsmade	12.0	8	8
9	Pierre Balian	14.5	11	9
10	Ben Woolwine	14.5	9	10
11	Luis Hernández	16.0	10	11
12	Nathan Evancho	18.0	12	12

=== Women's singles ===
Women's results
Rank	Skater	Total	SP	FS
1st place, gold medalist(s)	Erica Archambault	2.0	2	1
2	Natalie Mecher	2.5	1	2
3	Danielle Kahle	6.5	7	3
4	Alexandra Patterson	7.0	4	5
5	Jane Bugaeva	8.0	8	4
6	Adriana DeSanctis	8.5	3	7
7	Shanell Noji	9.0	6	6
8	Stephanie Rosenthal	11.5	5	9
9	Sandra Jean Rucker	12.5	9	8
10	Kristina Olson	16.5	13	10
11	Emily Hughes	17.0	12	11
12	Lisa Dannemiller	17.5	11	12
13	Megan Williams-Stewart	19.0	10	14
14	Katie Stewart	20.0	14	13

=== Pairs ===
Pairs results
Rank	Team	Total	SP	FS
1st place, gold medalist(s)	Amy Howerton / Steven Pottenger	1.5	1	1
2	Brittany Vise / Nicholas Kole	3.0	2	2
3	Colette Appel / Lee Harris	5.0	4	3
4	Chelsea Meador / Josh Martin	6.5	3	5
5	Christie Baca / Scott Smith	7.0	6	4
6	Brooke Castile / Benjamin Okolski	8.5	5	6
7	Andrea Varraux / David Pelletier	11.5	9	7
8	Amanda Harris / David Sanders	11.5	7	8
9	Shantel Jordan / Jeremy Barrett	14.0	10	9
10	Janice Mayne / Deryck Szatkowski	14.0	8	10
11	Tatiana Klunchoo / Manny Gardner	16.5	11	11
12	Marina Kolomey / Yevgeniy Shvetsov	18.0	12	12

=== Ice dance ===
Pairs results
Rank	Team	Total	C1	C2	OD	FD
1	Morgan Matthews / Maxim Zavozin	3.2	4	4	1	1
2	Kirsten Frisch / Brent Bommentre	3.6	1	1	2	2
3	Flo Steed / Augie Hill	5.6	2	2	3	3
4	Carly Donowick / Leo Ungar	7.6	3	3	4	4
5	Victoria Devins / Kevin O'Keefe	10.6	5	5	6	5
6	Sarah Solomon / Benjamin Cohen	12.6	7	6	5	7
7	Meryl Davis / Charlie White	12.8	6	7	7	6
8	Stephanie Ellis / Patrick Connelly	16.0	8	8	8	8
9	Jennifer Wester / Jonathan Harris	18.8	10	9	10	9
10	Lindsay Evans / Christian Wilson	20.2	9	10	9	11
11	Alisa Allapach / Benjaman Westenberger	21.0	11	11	11	10
12	Kimberley Steffey / Richard Brown	24.0	12	12	12	12

== International team selections ==
=== World Championships ===
U.S. delegation to the 2003 World Championships
No.	Men	Women	Pairs	Ice dance
1	Michael Weiss	Michelle Kwan	Tiffany Scott; Philip Dulebohn	Naomi Lang; Peter Tchernyshev
2	Timothy Goebel	Sarah Hughes	Kathryn Orscher; Garrett Lucash	Tanith Belbin; Benjamin Agosto
3	Ryan Jahnke	Sasha Cohen	Rena Inoue; John Baldwin	—N/a

U.S. alternates to the 2003 World Championships
No.	Men	Women	Pairs	Ice dance
1	Scott Smith	Ann Patrice McDonough	Larisa Spielberg; Craig Joeright	Melissa Gregory; Denis Petukhov
2	Matthew Savoie	Jenny Kirk	Stephanie Kalesavich; Aaron Parchem	Loren Galler-Rabinowitz; David Mitchell
3	Parker Pennington	Yebin Mok	Jennifer Don; Jonathon Hunt	Emilie Nussear; Mathew Gates

=== Four Continents Championships ===
The 2003 Four Continents Championships were held February 12–16 in Beijing, China. Tanith Belbin and Benjamin Agosto won the silver medals in the ice dance event, while Naomi Lang and Peter Tchernyshev won the bronze medals.

U.S. delegation to the 2003 Four Continents Championships
No.	Men	Women	Pairs	Ice dance
1	Timothy Goebel	Sarah Hughes	Tiffany Scott; Philip Dulebohn	Naomi Lang; Peter Tchernyshev
2	Ryan Jahnke	Ann Patrice McDonough	Kathryn Orscher; Garrett Lucash	Tanith Belbin; Benjamin Agosto
3	Scott Smith	Jenny Kirk	Rena Inoue; John Baldwin	Melissa Gregory; Denis Petukhov

U.S. alternates to the 2003 Four Continents Championships
No.	Men	Women	Pairs	Ice dance
1	Matthew Savoie	Yebin Mok	Larisa Spielberg; Craig Joeright	Loren Galler-Rabinowitz; David Mitchell
2	Parker Pennington	Amber Corwin	Stephanie Kalesavich; Aaron Parchem	Emilie Nussear; Mathew Gates
3	Evan Lysacek	Louann Donovan	Jennifer Don; Jonathon Hunt	Kimberly Navarro; Robert Shmalo

=== World Junior Championships ===
U.S. delegation to the 2003 World Junior Championships
No.	Men	Women	Pairs	Ice dance
1	Parker Pennington	Yebin Mok	Jennifer Don; Jonathon Hunt	Loren Galler-Rabinowitz; David Mitchell
2	Evan Lysacek	Beatrisa Liang	Tiffany Stiegler; Johnnie Stiegler	Morgan Matthews; Maxim Zavozin
3	—N/a	Louann Donovan	Tiffany Vise; Laureano Ibarra	Kristen Frisch; Brent Bommentre

U.S. alternates to the 2003 World Junior Championships
No.	Men	Women	Pairs	Ice dance
1	Nicholas LaRoche	Alissa Czisny	Kristen Roth; Michael McPherson	Flo Steed; Augie Hill
2	Dennis Phan	Erica Arcambault	Amy Howerton; Steven Pottenger	Carly Donowick; Leo Unger
3	Jordan Brauninger	Natalie Mecher	Brittany Vise; Nicholas Kole	Victoria Devins; Kevin O'Keefe
