= 2002 U.S. Figure Skating Championships =

Figure skating competition

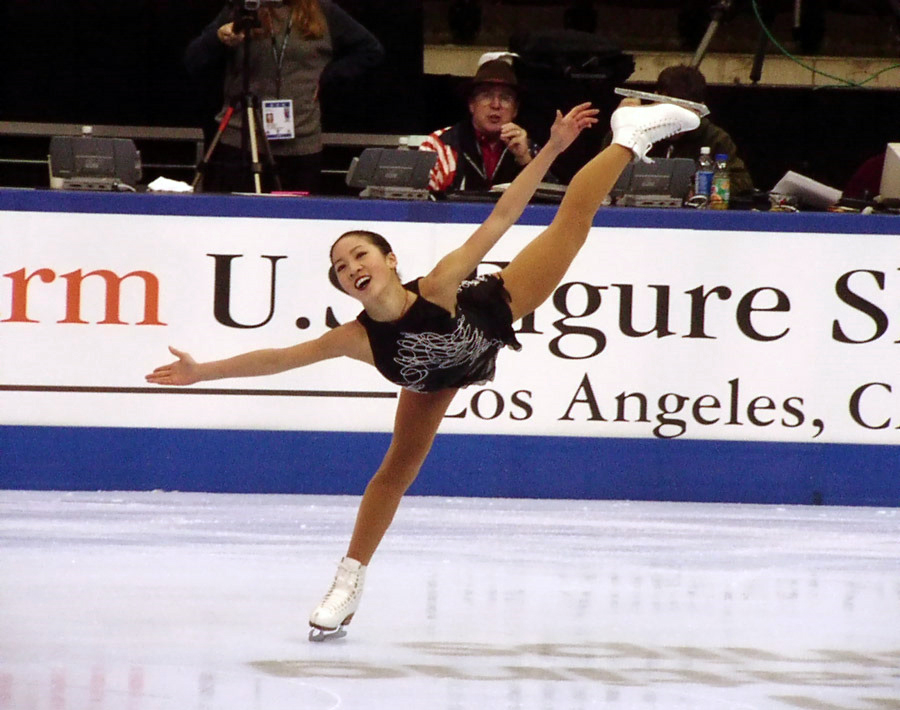
- Type: National championship
- Date: January 6 – 13
- Season: 2001–02
- Location: Los Angeles, California
- Venue: Staples Center

Champions
- Men's singles: Todd Eldredge
- Ladies' singles: Michelle Kwan
- Pairs: Kyoko Ina / John Zimmerman
- Ice dance: Naomi Lang / Peter Tchernyshev
- Previous: 2001 U.S. Championships
- Next: 2003 U.S. Championships

The 2002 U.S. Figure Skating Championships took place between January 6 and 13, 2002 in Los Angeles, California. Medals were awarded in four colors: gold (first), silver (second), bronze (third), and pewter (fourth) in four disciplines – men's singles, ladies' singles, pair skating, and ice dancing – across three levels: senior, junior, and novice.

The event determined the U.S. teams for the 2002 Winter Olympics, 2002 World Championships, 2002 Four Continents Championships, and 2002 World Junior Championships.

== Competition notes ==
- There was a tie in the senior men's short program between Eldredge and Goebel. Both received four first place marks, three seconds and two thirds.
- Although placing second, senior ice dancers Tanith Belbin / Benjamin Agosto were not placed on the Olympic team due to citizenship problems. Third place finishers Melissa Gregory / Denis Petukov, who would under normal circumstances been the first alternates, also were ineligible due to citizenship problems. Fourth place finishers Beata Handra / Charles Sinek were therefore the second entry to the Olympic team. It was their first World level competition.
- The senior compulsory dances were the Ravensburger Waltz and the Blues. The junior compulsory dances were the Viennese Waltz and the Quickstep. The novice compulsory dances were the Tango and the Paso Doble.

== Senior results ==
=== Men ===
Rank	Name	Club	TFP	SP	FS
1	Todd Eldredge	Los Angeles FSC	1.5	1	1
2	Timothy Goebel	Winterhurst FSC	2.5	1	2
3	Michael Weiss	Washington FSC	5.5	5	3
4	Matthew Savoie	Illinois Valley FSC	5.5	3	4
5	Johnny Weir	Univ of Delaware FSC	7.0	4	5
6	Derrick Delmore	Washington FSC	9.0	6	6
7	Ryan Bradley	Broadmoor SC	11.0	8	7
8	Ryan Jahnke	Broadmoor SC	11.5	7	8
9	Scott Smith	The Gardens FSC of MD	13.5	9	9
10	Justin Dillon	St Moritz ISC	15.5	11	10
11	Shepherd Clark	The SC of Boston	17.0	12	11
12	Evan Lysacek	DuPage FSC	18.0	10	13
13	Parker Pennington	Winterhurst FSC	19.0	14	12
14	Rohene Ward	Starlight Ice Dance Club	21.5	15	14
15	Michael Villarreal	All Year FSC	23.5	17	15
16	Don Baldwin	Los Angeles FSC	23.5	13	17
17	Michael Sasaki	South Bay FSC	24.0	16	16
18	Sean Calvillo	All Year FSC	27.0	18	18

=== Ladies ===
Rank	Name	Club	TFP	SP	FS
1	Michelle Kwan	Los Angeles FSC	1.5	1	1
2	Sasha Cohen	Orange County FSC	3.0	2	2
3	Sarah Hughes	The SC of New York	4.5	3	3
4	Angela Nikodinov	All Year FSC	6.0	4	4
5	Jennifer Kirk	The SC of Boston	8.0	6	5
6	Ann Patrice McDonough	Broadmoor SC	8.5	5	6
7	Andrea Gardiner	Houston FSC	11.5	9	7
8	Amber Corwin	All Year FSC	12.0	8	8
9	Beatrisa Liang	All Year FSC	13.5	7	10
10	Ye Bin Mok	All Year FSC	16.5	15	9
11	Alissa Czisny	St Clair Shores FSC	16.5	11	11
12	Sara Wheat	Univ of Delaware FSC	17.0	10	12
13	Joan Cristobal	Peninsula SC	19.5	13	13
14	Molly Quigley	Nashville FSC	22.0	16	14
15	Christina Gordon	Alaska Assoc of FS	22.0	12	16
16	Patricia Mansfield	River's Edge FSC	23.5	17	15
17	Stacey Pensgen	Genesee FSC	24.0	14	17
WD	Andrea Varraux	Univ of Delaware FSC		18	

=== Pairs ===
Rank	Name	Club	TFP	SP	FS
1	Kyoko Ina / John Zimmerman	The SC of New York / Birmingham FSC	1.5	1	1
2	Tiffany Scott / Philip Dulebohn	Colonial FSC / Univ of Delaware FSC	3.5	3	2
3	Stephanie Kalesavich / Aaron Parchem	Detroit SC	4.0	2	3
4	Rena Inoue / John Baldwin	All Year FSC	6.5	5	4
5	Katie Orscher / Garrett Lucash	SC of Hartford / Charter Oak FSC	9.0	8	5
6	Laura Handy / Jonathon Hunt	Univ of Delaware FSC	9.0	6	6
7	Larisa Spielberg / Craig Joeright	Onyx Skating Academy	11.5	9	7
8	Molly Quigley / Bert Cording	Nashville FSC	11.5	7	8
9	Tiffany Stiegler / Johnnie Stiegler	Los Angeles FSC	14.0	10	9
10	Jennifer Don / Jered Guzman	Los Angeles FSC	15.5	11	10
11	Sima Ganaba / Amir Ganaba	Los Angeles FSC	17.0	12	11
12	Marcy Hinzmann / Ronnie Biancosino	Winterhurst FSC / Univ of Delaware FSC	18.5	13	12
13	Lindsay Rogeness / Brian Rogeness	Los Angeles FSC	20.0	14	13
WD	Danielle Hartsell / Steve Hartsell	Detroit SC		4	

=== Ice dancing ===
Rank	Name	Club	TFP	CD1	CD2	OD	FD
1	Naomi Lang / Peter Tchernyshev	American Academy FSC	2.0	1	1	1	1
2	Tanith Belbin / Benjamin Agosto	Detroit SC	4.0	2	2	2	2
3	Melissa Gregory / Denis Petukhov	Broadmoor SC / Skokie Valley SC	7.0	4	4	4	3
4	Beata Handra / Charles Sinek	All Year FSC / The SC of Boston	7.0	3	3	3	4
5	Jessica Joseph / Brandon Forsyth	Detroit SC / The SC of Boston	10.0	5	5	5	5
6	Kimberly Navarro / Robert Shmalo	Santa Rosa FSC / Queen City FSC	13.0	7	7	7	6
7	Tiffany Hyden / Vazgen Azroyan	Broadmoor SC	13.0	6	6	6	7
8	Kakani Young / Ikaika Young	Seattle SC	16.0	8	8	8	8
9	Lia Nitake / Ian Ross-Frye	All Year FSC / Wissahickon SC	18.8	10	9	10	9
10	Crystal Beckerdite / Raphael Kelling	Broadmoor SC	19.0	9	9	9	10
11	Cerise Henzes / Rio Foster	Peninsula SC	22.4	12	12	11	11
12	Laura Munana / Luke Munana	Peninsula SC	23.6	11	11	12	12
13	Caitlin Obremski / Jonathan Magalnick	Washington FSC / Coyotes SC of Arizona	27.0	14	14	14	13
WD	Annie Yang / Walter Lang	Los Angeles FSC / The SC of Boston					

== Junior results ==
=== Men ===
Rank	Name	Club	TFP	SP	FS
1	Nicholas LaRoche	All Year FSC	2.0	2	1
2	Shaun Rogers	Univ of Delaware FSC	2.5	1	2
3	Benjamin Miller	St Paul FSC	4.5	3	3
4	Matthew Lind	Colonial FSC	7.0	6	4
5	Jordan Brauninger	Northern Kentucky SC	7.0	4	5
6	Jordan Wilson	Santa Rosa FSC	8.5	5	6
7	Dustin Brinsmade	Broadmoor SC	11.5	9	7
8	Dennis Phan	Los Angeles FSC	11.5	7	8
9	Adam Aronowitz	American Academy FSC	13.0	8	9
10	Bradford Griffies	Atlanta FSC	15.5	11	10
11	Joshua Uster	DuPage FSC	16.0	10	11
WD	Daniel Steffel	Peninsula SC		12	

=== Ladies ===
Rank	Name	Club	TFP	SP	FS
1	Louann Donovan	The SC of Boston	1.5	1	1
2	Jennifer Don	Los Angeles FSC	3.5	3	2
3	Felicia Beck	Los Angeles FSC	6.0	2	5
4	Adriana DeSanctis	Glissad Academy At Ic...	7.0	6	4
5	Lauren Thomas	Johnstown FSC	7.5	9	3
6	Kristen Sheaffer	Starlight Ice Dance Club	8.5	5	6
7	Amber Czisny	St Clair Shores FSC	10.0	4	8
8	Aanya Reiten	Lakewood Winter Club	10.5	7	7
9	Lea Nightwalker	ISC of Fort Collins	14.0	10	9
10	Katie Stewart	Detroit SC	14.0	8	10
11	Emily Hughes	The SC of New York	16.5	11	11
WD	Samira Banna	Lilac City FSC			

=== Pairs ===
Rank	Name	Club	TFP	SP	FS
1	Colette Appel / Lee Harris	Individual Member / Detroit SC	2.0	2	1
2	Janice Mayne / Josh Martin	All Year FSC / Los Angeles FSC	5.0	6	2
3	Tiffany Vise / Laureano Ibarra	Broadmoor SC / Colorado SC	5.0	4	3
4	Christie Baca / Scott Smith	Orange County FSC / Glacier Falls FSC	5.5	3	4
5	Amy Howerton / Steven Pottenger	Dallas FSC	5.5	1	5
6	Jacqueline Jimenez / Themistocles Leftheris	The SC of New York	8.5	5	6
7	Emma Phibbs / Devin Patrick	Washington FSC / All Year FSC	10.5	7	7
8	Amanda Evora / Michael Adler	Southwest Florida FSC	13.0	8	9
9	Briana McInerney / Joseph Jorgens	The SC of New York / Washington FSC	13.5	11	8
10	Alexis Hoffstadter / Lucas Vriner	DuPage FSC	14.5	9	10
11	Jacqueline Matson / Johnnie Bevan	Glacier Falls FSC / Spokane FSC	16.0	10	11
12	Brittany Karlon / Scott Corbin	St Clair Shores FSC	18.0	12	12

=== Ice dancing ===
Rank	Name	Club	TFP	CD1	CD2	OD	FD
1	Loren Galler-Rabinowitz / David Mitchell	The SC of Boston	3.0	1	1	1	2
2	Melissa Ralph / Ryan O'Meara	Detroit SC / Coyotes SC of Arizona	4.4	4	4	3	1
3	Kendra Goodwin / Chris Obzansky	Univ of Delaware FSC	5.0	2	2	2	3
4	Kirsten Frisch / Brent Bommentre	Wissahickon SC	8.6	3	3	4	5
5	Cheryl Russell / Kenny Metzger	Peninsula SC	9.0	5	5	5	4
6	Flo Steed / Augie Hill	Texas Gulf Coast FSC / Lone Star FSC	12.4	8	6	6	6
7	Victoria Devins / Kevin O'Keefe	The SC of Boston	14.2	7	8	7	7
8	Christina Zepeda / Nicholas Hart	Dallas FSC	15.4	6	7	8	8
9	Laura Smith / Andrew Smith	Los Angeles FSC	18.0	9	9	9	9
10	Lindsay Evans / Trevor Bird	Colorado SC / Dallas FSC	20.6	11	12	10	10
11	Kate Slattery / Patrick Connelly	Univ of Delaware FSC / All Year FSC	21.6	10	10	11	11
12	Anna Scheumann / Levi McDonough	Univ of Delaware FSC / San Diego FSC	23.8	12	11	12	12
