= 1999 U.S. Figure Skating Championships =

Figure skating competition

- Type: National championship
- Date: February 7 – 14
- Season: 1998–99
- Location: Salt Lake City, Utah
- Venue: Delta Center

Champions
- Men's singles: Michael Weiss
- Ladies' singles: Michelle Kwan
- Pairs: Danielle Harstsell / Steve Hartsell
- Ice dance: Naomi Lang / Peter Tchernyshev
- Previous: 1998 U.S. Championships
- Next: 2000 U.S. Championships

The 1999 U.S. Figure Skating Championships took place on February 7–14, 1999 at the Delta Center in Salt Lake City, Utah. Medals were awarded in four colors: gold (first), silver (second), bronze (third), and pewter (fourth) in five disciplines – men's singles, ladies' singles, pair skating, ice dancing, and compulsory figures (mixed) – across three levels: senior, junior, and novice.

The event was used to determine the U.S. teams for the 1999 World Championships and the 1999 Four Continents Championships.

It was the final U.S. Championships that included a competition in figures, which had appeared at every U.S. nationals since it began. For the only time, figures were a mixed event separated only by the three levels, with men and women competing against each other. The final skater to trace a figure at Nationals was Lauren Hill.

== Senior results ==
=== Men ===
The 1999 Championships were the first of three U.S. men's titles (1999, 2000, 2003) for Michael Weiss. This was the third appearance in the U.S. Championships for silver medalist, Trifun Zivanovic; and was his highest placing. Bronze medalist Timothy Goebel went on to win the Championships the following year.

| Rank | Name | TFP | SP | FS |
|---|---|---|---|---|
| 1 | Michael Weiss | 1.5 | 1 | 1 |
| 2 | Trifun Zivanovic | 3.5 | 3 | 2 |
| 3 | Timothy Goebel | 4.0 | 2 | 3 |
| 4 | Matthew Savoie | 6.0 | 4 | 4 |
| 5 | Shepherd Clark | 7.5 | 5 | 5 |
| 6 | Damon Allen | 10.0 | 6 | 7 |
| 7 | Justin Dillon | 11.0 | 10 | 6 |
| 8 | Michael Chack | 13.5 | 9 | 9 |
| 9 | Ryan Jahnke | 14.0 | 12 | 8 |
| 10 | Derrick Delmore | 10.5 | 7 | 13 |
| 11 | Dan Hollander | 17.0 | 14 | 10 |
| 12 | Jere Michael | 18.5 | 15 | 11 |
| 13 | John Baldwin Jr. | 18.5 | 13 | 12 |
| 14 | Scott Smith | 21.5 | 11 | 15 |
| 15 | Matthew Kessinger | 22.0 | 16 | 14 |
| 16 | Peter St. Germaine | 25.0 | 18 | 16 |
| WD | Danny Clauson | | 8 | |
| WD | Jeff Merica | | 17 | |

=== Ladies ===
For 1999 ladies' champion Michelle Kwan, this was the third of her nine U.S. titles. Silver medalist Naomi Nari Nam was appearing for the first time in the senior ladies' competition. Despite her second-place finish, she was not sent to the World Championships because she was not age-eligible. The 1999 World Junior Figure Skating Championships, the corresponding World-level event for which she was age-eligible, had been held earlier that season. The bronze medal win was Angela Nikodinov's first time on the U.S. ladies' medals stand. She would take 3rd place again in 2001.

| Rank | Name | TFP | SP | FS |
|---|---|---|---|---|
| 1 | Michelle Kwan | 1.5 | 1 | 1 |
| 2 | Naomi Nari Nam | 4.0 | 4 | 2 |
| 3 | Angela Nikodinov | 6.0 | 6 | 3 |
| 4 | Sarah Hughes | 6.0 | 2 | 5 |
| 5 | Erin Pearl | 8.5 | 5 | 6 |
| 6 | Amber Corwin | 8.5 | 3 | 7 |
| 7 | Brittney McConn | 9.0 | 10 | 4 |
| 8 | Andrea Aggeler | 12.0 | 8 | 8 |
| 9 | Stacey Pensgen | 12.5 | 7 | 9 |
| 10 | Susan Ng | 17.0 | 12 | 11 |
| 11 | Abbi Gleeson | 17.5 | 15 | 10 |
| 12 | Camie Doyle | 17.5 | 9 | 13 |
| 13 | Elizabeth O'Donnell | 19.0 | 14 | 12 |
| 14 | Angela Lien | 19.5 | 11 | 14 |
| 15 | Sydne Vogel | 23.0 | 16 | 15 |
| 16 | Andrea Gardiner | 24.5 | 17 | 16 |
| 17 | Alice Sue Claeys | 27.0 | 20 | 17 |
| 18 | Kristy Evans | 27.5 | 19 | 18 |
| 19 | Melissa Parker | 28.0 | 18 | 19 |
| WD | Morgan Rowe | | 13 | |

=== Pairs ===
| Rank | Name | TFP | SP | FS |
|---|---|---|---|---|
| 1 | Danielle Hartsell / Steve Hartsell | 1.5 | 1 | 1 |
| 2 | Kyoko Ina / John Zimmerman | 3.0 | 2 | 2 |
| 3 | Laura Handy / J. Paul Binnebose | 4.5 | 3 | 3 |
| 4 | Tiffany Stiegler / Johnnie Stiegler | 6.0 | 4 | 4 |
| 5 | Tiffany Scott / Philip Dulebohn | 8.0 | 6 | 5 |
| 6 | Amanda Magarian / Jered Guzman | 9.5 | 7 | 6 |
| 7 | Natalie Vlandis / James Peterson | 9.5 | 5 | 7 |
| 8 | Larisa Spielberg / Craig Joeright | 12.0 | 8 | 8 |
| 9 | Whitney Gaynor / David Delago | 13.5 | 9 | 9 |
| 10 | Tiffany Sfikas / Bert Cording | 15.0 | 10 | 10 |
| 11 | Trisha Hayes / Richard Gillam | 16.5 | 11 | 11 |
| 12 | Christina Connally / Kevin Donovan | 18.0 | 12 | 12 |

=== Ice dancing ===
| Rank | Name | TFP | CD1 | CD2 | OD | FD |
|---|---|---|---|---|---|---|
| 1 | Naomi Lang / Peter Tchernyshev | 2.0 | 1 | 1 | 1 | 1 |
| 2 | Eve Chalom / Mathew Gates | 4.0 | 2 | 2 | 2 | 2 |
| 3 | Deborah Koegel / Oleg Fediukov | 6.0 | 3 | 3 | 3 | 3 |
| 4 | Beata Handra / Charles Sinek | 8.0 | 4 | 4 | 4 | 4 |
| 5 | Tiffany Hyden / John Lee | 11.6 | 5 | 5 | 6 | 6 |
| 6 | Stephanie Woodman / Robert Peal | 12.2 | 7 | 8 | 7 | 5 |
| 7 | Christie Moxley / Tom Gassbeck | 12.4 | 6 | 6 | 5 | 7 |
| 8 | Shannon Simon / Jason Simon | 15.8 | 8 | 7 | 8 | 8 |

== Junior results ==
=== Men ===
| Rank | Name | TFP | SP | FS |
|---|---|---|---|---|
| 1 | Ryan Bradley | 1.5 | 1 | 1 |
| 2 | Don Baldwin | 4.0 | 4 | 2 |
| 3 | Parker Pennington | 5.0 | 2 | 4 |
| 4 | Johnny Weir | 6.5 | 7 | 3 |
| 5 | Kurt Fromknecht | 9.0 | 8 | 5 |
| 6 | Daniel Lee | 9.0 | 6 | 6 |
| 7 | Braden Overett | 9.5 | 3 | 8 |
| 8 | Joshua Figurido | 11.5 | 5 | 9 |
| 9 | Jordan Wilson | 12.5 | 11 | 7 |
| 10 | Eric Schoyer | 16.0 | 10 | 11 |
| 11 | William Rasmussen | 16.5 | 13 | 10 |
| 12 | James Yoo | 17.5 | 9 | 13 |
| 13 | Sean Cavillo | 18.0 | 12 | 12 |
| 14 | L. Jason Heffron | 22.5 | 17 | 14 |
| 15 | Matthew Wesenberg | 23.0 | 16 | 15 |
| 16 | Robert Brathwaite | 23.5 | 15 | 16 |
| 17 | Fitzhugh Middleton | 24.0 | 14 | 17 |

=== Ladies ===
| Rank | Name | TFP | SP | FS |
|---|---|---|---|---|
| 1 | Sara Wheat | 2.5 | 3 | 1 |
| 2 | Sasha Cohen | 2.5 | 1 | 2 |
| 3 | Jennifer Kirk | 4.0 | 2 | 3 |
| 4 | Elizabeth Kwon | 6.0 | 4 | 4 |
| 5 | Ye Bin Mok | 7.5 | 5 | 5 |
| 6 | Ann Patrice McDonough | 10.5 | 7 | 7 |
| 7 | Arim Choi | 11.0 | 6 | 8 |
| 8 | Kristen Adamczyk | 11.5 | 11 | 6 |
| 9 | Carina Chen | 13.0 | 8 | 9 |
| 10 | J.J. Mathews | 14.5 | 9 | 10 |
| 11 | Stephanie Roth | 16.0 | 10 | 11 |

=== Pairs ===
| Rank | Name | TFP | SP | FS |
|---|---|---|---|---|
| 1 | Sima Ganaba / Amir Ganaba | 1.5 | 1 | 1 |
| 2 | Jaisa MacAdam / Garrett Lucash | 3.5 | 3 | 2 |
| 3 | Megan Sierk / Dustin Sierk | 4.0 | 2 | 3 |
| 4 | Katie Gadkowski / Derek Trent | 6.0 | 4 | 4 |
| 5 | Lindsay Rogeness / Brian Rogeness | 8.0 | 6 | 5 |
| 6 | Emily Morgan / Justin Cogley | 10.0 | 8 | 6 |
| 7 | Jessica Waldstein / Devin Patrick | 11.5 | 9 | 7 |
| 8 | Kacy Niemeier / John Gerth | 11.5 | 7 | 8 |
| 9 | Shawna Tennile Winter / Aaron Parchem | 11.5 | 5 | 9 |
| 10 | Molly Beth Quigley / Kelby Renfro | 15.0 | 10 | 10 |
| 11 | Carey Floyd / Eric Bohnstedt | 16.5 | 11 | 11 |
| 12 | Stephanie McBath / David Gordon | 18.0 | 12 | 12 |
| WD | Erin Rex / John Wagner | | 13 | |

=== Ice dancing ===
| Rank | Name | TFP | CD1 | CD2 | OD | FD |
|---|---|---|---|---|---|---|
| 1 | Jamie Silverstein / Justin Pekarek | 2.0 | 1 | 1 | 1 | 1 |
| 2 | Emilie Nussear / Brandon Forsyth | 4.0 | 2 | 2 | 2 | 2 |
| 3 | Crystal Lynn Beckerdite / Matt Healy | 7.0 | 4 | 4 | 4 | 3 |
| 4 | Alison Newman / Michel Klus | 7.0 | 3 | 3 | 3 | 4 |
| 5 | Jesica Valentine / Matthew Kossack | 10.0 | 5 | 5 | 5 | 5 |
| 6 | Anna Berry / Christopher Hayes | 12.0 | 6 | 6 | 6 | 6 |
| 7 | Brandy Taylor / Vincent VanVliet | 14.6 | 7 | 7 | 8 | 7 |
| 8 | Elizabeth Philpot / Dirk Peterson | 16.4 | 8 | 8 | 7 | 9 |
| 9 | Penny Schnering / Timothy Jones | 17.0 | 9 | 9 | 9 | 8 |
| 10 | Katy Hill / Nick Traxler | 21.6 | 11 | 12 | 10 | 11 |
| 11 | Alyssa Hicks / Ty Cockrum | 21.8 | 12 | 11 | 12 | 10 |
| 12 | Sarah Thebaud / Russell Thebaud | 25.0 | 13 | 13 | 13 | 12 |
| WD | Disa Steiber / Patrick Connolly | | 10 | 10 | 11 | |

== Novice results ==
=== Men ===
| Rank | Name | TFP | SP | FS |
|---|---|---|---|---|
| 1 | Evan Lysacek | 2.0 | 2 | 1 |
| 2 | Nicholas LaRoche | 4.5 | 1 | 4 |
| 3 | Bradford Griffies | 5.5 | 7 | 2 |
| 4 | Benjamin Miller | 5.5 | 5 | 3 |
| 5 | Zachary Grenier | 7.0 | 4 | 5 |
| 6 | Michael Villarreal | 7.5 | 3 | 6 |
| 7 | Shaun Rogers | 11.5 | 9 | 7 |
| 8 | Joseph Cabral | 12.0 | 8 | 8 |
| 9 | Rusty Fein | 13.0 | 6 | 10 |
| 10 | Matthew Quon | 15.0 | 12 | 9 |
| 11 | Benny Wu | 17.0 | 10 | 12 |
| 12 | Dustin Brinsmade | 17.5 | 13 | 11 |
| 13 | Michael Sasaki | 19.5 | 11 | 14 |
| 14 | Daniel Steffel | 20.0 | 14 | 13 |

=== Ladies ===
| Rank | Name | TFP | SP | FS |
|---|---|---|---|---|
| 1 | Deanna Stellato | 1.5 | 1 | 1 |
| 2 | Andrey Rose Chua | 3.0 | 2 | 2 |
| 3 | Beatrisa Liang | 4.5 | 3 | 3 |
| 4 | Midori Williams | 6.0 | 4 | 4 |
| 5 | Katie McGuire | 8.0 | 6 | 5 |
| 6 | Joanna Glick | 9.5 | 7 | 6 |
| 7 | Megan Ignatowicz | 11.5 | 5 | 9 |
| 8 | Evelyn Kong | 12.0 | 10 | 7 |
| 9 | Jody deDeugd | 13.5 | 11 | 8 |
| 10 | Kim Ryan | 14.0 | 8 | 10 |
| 11 | Crystal Calayag | 15.5 | 9 | 11 |
| 12 | Amber Czisny | 18.0 | 12 | 12 |

=== Pairs ===
| Rank | Name | TFP | SP | FS |
|---|---|---|---|---|
| 1 | Terese Anselmi / Michael Adler | 1.5 | 1 | 1 |
| 2 | Colette Appel / Adam Kaplan | 2.0 | 2 | 1 |
| 3 | Amanda Ross / Michael McPherson | 5.0 | 4 | 3 |
| 4 | Anna Campos / Ronnie Biancosino | 7.5 | 3 | 6 |
| 5 | Morgan Stanley / Val Rising-Moore | 8.0 | 8 | 4 |
| 6 | Alexander Ainsworth / Noah Abrahams | 9.5 | 9 | 5 |
| 7 | Tiffany Vise / Ryan Bradley | 9.5 | 5 | 7 |
| 8 | Melanie Maltby / Jeremy Allen | 11.0 | 6 | 8 |
| 9 | Brooke Kayland / Kirk Forbes | 13.5 | 7 | 10 |
| 10 | Tarah McGarvey / Joseph Jorgens | 14.0 | 10 | 9 |
| 11 | Erin Goto / Scott Smith | 16.5 | 11 | 11 |
| 12 | Abigail Alfajora / Brian Webster | 18.0 | 12 | 12 |
| 13 | Lauren Lubow / Sean Tilley | 19.5 | 13 | 13 |

=== Ice dancing ===
| Rank | Name | CD1 | CD2 | FD |
|---|---|---|---|---|
| 1 | Kakani Young / Ikaika Young | 1 | 2 | 1 |
| 2 | Lydia Manon / Chris Obzansky | 2 | 1 | 2 |
| 3 | Lia Nitake / Ryan O'Meara | 3 | 4 | 3 |
| 4 | Allison Seitchik / Ross Brown | 4 | 3 | 4 |
| 5 | Loren Galler-Rabinowitz / David Mitchell | 5 | 5 | 5 |
| 6 | Jessica Seitchik / Ian Ross-Frye | 6 | 6 | 6 |
| 7 | Laura Smith / Andrew Smith | 7 | 8 | 7 |
| 8 | Ashleigh Brooks / Michael Nigh | 8 | 7 | 8 |
| 9 | Stephanie McNeill / Paul Arthur Kimzey | 10 | 10 | 9 |
| 10 | Brittany May / Michael Lewis | 9 | 9 | 10 |
| 11 | Katie Collins / Lincoln Coverdale | 11 | 12 | 11 |
| 12 | Stacey Wojtowicz / Ethan Lea | 12 | 11 | 12 |

== Figures results ==
=== Senior ===
| Rank | Name | Fact. places | CF1 | CF2 | CF3 |
|---|---|---|---|---|---|
| 1 | Lisa Frenzel Swain | 9.0 | 2 | 6 | 1 |
| 2 | Sonja Gullen | 10.0 | 1 | 1 | 8 |
| 3 | Lauren Hill | 13.0 | 7 | 4 | 2 |
| 3 | Lynne Petta | 13.0 | 4 | 3 | 6 |
| 5 | Kharen Kloeffler | 15.0 | 10 | 2 | 3 |
| 6 | Nell Alexander | 18.0 | 5 | 9 | 4 |
| 6 | Josselyn Baumgartner | 18.0 | 6 | 7 | 5 |
| 8 | Amy Brolsma | 21.0 | 9 | 5 | 7 |
| 8 | Cammi Bruns | 21.0 | 3 | 8 | 10 |
| 10 | Erika Grigg | 29.0 | 8 | 12 | 9 |
| 11 | Domenica Palandro | 33.0 | 12 | 10 | 11 |
| 12 | Tracy Dedrick | 34.0 | 11 | 11 | 12 |

=== Junior ===
| Rank | Name | Fact. places | CF1 | CF2 | CF3 |
|---|---|---|---|---|---|
| 1 | Jessica Koslow | 5.0 | 2 | 1 | 2 |
| 1 | Erin White | 5.0 | 1 | 3 | 1 |
| 3 | Lindsey Westbrook | 15.0 | 4 | 2 | 9 |
| 4 | Kristin Griffitts | 17.0 | 7 | 5 | 5 |
| 5 | Megan O'Brian | 18.0 | 5 | 6 | 7 |
| 6 | Jessica Berg | 20.0 | 6 | 10 | 4 |
| 6 | Nicole Lemanski | 20.0 | 10 | 7 | 3 |
| 8 | Tami Trenter | 23.0 | 3 | 12 | 8 |
| 9 | Lani Lilsson | 26.0 | 11 | 4 | 11 |
| 9 | Marika Perry | 8 | 8 | 10 | 26.0 |
| 11 | Shannon Edens | 27.0 | 12 | 9 | 6 |
| 12 | Jennifer Kauffman | 32.0 | 9 | 11 | 12 |

=== Novice ===
| Rank | Name | Maj places |
|---|---|---|
| 1 | Abbey Spresser | 5/1 |
| 2 | Melissa Orr | 9/2 |
| 3 | Lesley Loss | 5/3 |
| 4 | Casey Rhodes | 5/4 |
| 5 | Emily Bobel | 5/6 TOM 22 |
| 6 | Lindsay Crawford | 5/6 TOM 26 |
| 7 | Victoria Bowa | 7/7 |
| 8 | Virginia Meyer | 5/7 |
| 9 | DeVonne Johnson | 6/8 |
| 10 | Devon Davis | 8/10 |
| 11 | Maria Gaudiel | 7/11 |
| 12 | Rachel Berry | 9/12 |
