= Ann Patrice McDonough =

American figure skater

Personal information
- Born: May 29, 1985 (age 41) Osan, Gyeonggi, South Korea
- Home town: Colorado Springs, Colorado, U.S.
- Height: 5 ft 2 in (1.57 m)

Figure skating career
- Country: United States
- Skating club: Broadmoor SC
- Began skating: 1996
- Retired: 2004
Medal record
Figure skating: Ladies' singles
Representing United States
World Junior Championships
| Gold medal – first place | 2002 Hamar | Ladies' singles |
| Silver medal – second place | 2001 Sofia | Ladies' singles |
Junior Grand Prix Final
| Gold medal – first place | 2000–01 Ayr | Ladies' singles |

Ann Patrice McDonough (born May 29, 1985) is an American former competitive figure skater. She is the 2002 World Junior champion and the 2003 U.S. national pewter medalist. McDonough retired from competition in 2004.

== Personal life ==
Ann Patrice McDonough was born in Osan, South Korea and adopted as an infant. Her mother, Julie McDonough, grew up in Korea and wanted to be a skater. She designed skating costumes for her daughter and other competitive skaters. The McDonough family moved to the United States in 1986.

She graduated from Cheyenne Mountain High School in 2002, at age 16.

== Career ==
=== Competitive ===
In the 1996–97 season, McDonough won the bronze medal at the novice level at the 1997 U.S. Championships. The following season she moved up to Junior, but placed 5th at sectionals and did not qualify for the Nationals.

In the 1998–99 season, McDonough won both her regional and sectional championship to qualify for the 1999 U.S. Championships, where she placed 6th on the junior level. She remained Junior for the 1999-2000 season and won the Junior national title at the 2000 U.S. Championships. This trip earned her an assignment to the Gardena Spring Trophy, which she won.

In the 2000–2001 season, McDonough made her debut on the ISU Junior Grand Prix. She won the bronze medal at her first event and the silver at her second, which qualified her for the Junior Grand Prix Final. She went on to win the Junior Grand Prix Final. McDonough made her senior national debut at the 2001 U.S. Championships and placed 7th. She went on to the 2001 World Junior Championships, where she won the silver medal.

In the 2001–02 season, McDonough made her senior international debut. She won the silver medal at the Nebelhorn Trophy and placed 6th in her Grand Prix debut at the 2001 NHK Trophy. At the 2002 U.S. Championships, she placed 6th. She was assigned to the 2002 Four Continents, where she placed 5th, and to the 2002 World Junior Championships, which she won.

In the 2002–03 season, McDonough won the silver medal at the 2002 Skate America. She withdrew from 2002 Cup of Russia due to visa problems. McDonough won the pewter medal (4th place) at the 2003 U.S. Championships. She was assigned to the 2003 Four Continents, where she placed 4th.

In the 2003–04 season, McDonough placed 4th at the 2003 Cup of China. She placed 6th at the 2004 U.S. Championships. She retired from competitive skating following that season.

=== Post-competitive ===
Following her retirement, she has skated in the Radio City Christmas Spectacular with former pairs competitor Jonathon Hunt. She is also coaching in Westchester, New York, while working toward a biology degree.

In 2012, McDonough starred in ice shows on Royal Caribbean International cruises.

== Programs ==
| Season | Short program | Free skating | Exhibition |
|---|---|---|---|
| 2003–04 | Adagio of Spartacus and Phrygia by Aram Khachaturian | Swan Lake by Pyotr Tchaikovsky | |
| 2002–03 | Étude Op. 25, No. 1 by Frédéric Chopin | Madama Butterfly by Giacomo Puccini | All I Ask of You |
| 2001–02 | Étude Op. 25, No. 1 by Frédéric Chopin | Cinderella by Sergei Prokofiev; Romeo and Juliet by Nino Rota London Symphony Orchestra | |
| 2000–01 | The Turning Point (soundtrack); Zigeunerweisen by Pablo de Sarasate | Cinderella by Sergei Prokofiev | |
| 1995–96 | | Romeo and Juliet by Pyotr Tchaikovsky; Romeo and Juliet by Nino Rota | |

== Competitive highlights ==
GP: Grand Prix; JGP: Junior Grand Prix

International
| Event | 96–97 | 97–98 | 98–99 | 99–00 | 00–01 | 01–02 | 02–03 | 03–04 |
|---|---|---|---|---|---|---|---|---|
| Four Continents | | | | | | 5th | 4th | |
| GP Cup of China | | | | | | | | 4th |
| GP Cup of Russia | | | | | | | WD | |
| GP NHK Trophy | | | | | | 6th | | |
| GP Skate America | | | | | | | 2nd | |
| Nebelhorn Trophy | | | | | | 2nd | | |
International: Junior
| Junior Worlds | | | | | 2nd | 1st | | |
| JGP Final | | | | | 1st | | | |
| JGP Mexico | | | | | 3rd | | | |
| JGP Norway | | | | | 2nd | | | |
| Gardena | | | | 1st J | | | | |
National
| U.S. Champ. | 3rd N | | 6th J | 1st J | 7th | 6th | 4th | 6th |
| Midwestern Sect. | 1st N | 5th J | 1st J | 1st J | 1st | 3rd | | |
| Southwestern Reg. | 1st N | 1st J | 1st J | 1st J | 1st | 1st | | |
Levels: N = Novice; J = Junior. WD = Withdrew
