= Ryan Bradley =

American figure skater (born 1983)

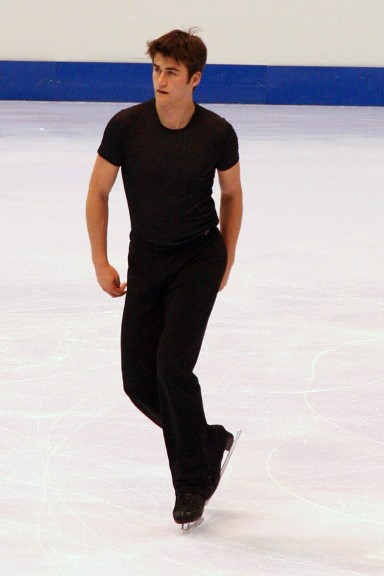
- Bradley at the 2006 Skate America

Personal information
- Full name: Ryan Scott Bradley
- Born: November 17, 1983 (age 42) Saint Joseph, Missouri, U.S.
- Home town: Colorado Springs, Colorado, U.S.
- Height: 5 ft 9 in (1.75 m)

Figure skating career
- Country: United States
- Discipline: Men's singles
- Retired: May 10, 2011

Medal record
U.S. Championships
Gold medal – first place	2011 Greensboro	Singles
Silver medal – second place	2007 Spokane	Singles

Ryan Scott Bradley (born November 17, 1983) is an American former competitive figure skater. He is the 2008 Skate Canada International silver medalist, the 2009 Skate America bronze medalist, the 2011 U.S. national champion, and a three-time U.S. Collegiate champion.

== Personal life ==
Bradley was born in Saint Joseph, Missouri, and comes from a family of skaters. His sister, Becky, is a skating coach and former competitive skater, and his mother is a USFSA judge. He attended University of Colorado Colorado Springs.

== Career ==
Ryan Bradley began skating at the age of two and participated in the U.S. Figure Skating Basic Skills program from 1986-1988.

From 1996-1998, Bradley competed in pairs skating with Tiffany Vise. They competed twice at the U.S. Championships. In 2001, he reached Sectionals with Melissa Gallegos. Bradley decided not to continue with pairs, preferring to focus on his singles career and not having enough time to train in both.

As a single skater, he won the silver medal at the Intermediate level at the Junior Olympics in the 1994-1995 season. The 1995-1996 season was Bradley's first at the Novice level, and he did not make it out of Sectionals. In the 1996-1997 season, he placed 7th at the novice level at Nationals. In the 1997-1998 season, Bradley won the silver medal at the novice level at Nationals. This win earned him a trip to the Triglav Trophy, which he won.

The following season, 1998–1999, Bradley debuted on the ISU Junior Grand Prix. He won medals at both his events. At that time, the World Junior Championships were held before the U.S. Championships. There, Bradley placed second and was placed on the team for the 1999 World Junior Championships, where he placed 10th. At the 1999 U.S. Championships, he won the Junior title. He competed at the Gardena Spring Trophy following Nationals and won the competition.

In the 1999-2000 season, Bradley remained on the Junior Grand Prix circuit. He won two more medals and qualified for the Junior Grand Prix Final, where he finished 8th. He went on to place 7th in his senior debut at the 2000 U.S. Championships. He went on to place 5th at the 2000 World Junior Championships.

In the 2000-2001 season, Bradley won both of his Junior Grand Prix events and made his senior international debut at the Golden Spin of Zagreb, which he won. He placed 5th at the Junior Grand Prix Final. He placed 9th at the 2001 U.S. Championships. He was originally placed on the team for the 2001 World Junior Championships; however, he was forced to withdraw prior to the event with injury. He had surgery to repair damage to his landing knee.

In the 2001-2002 season, U.S. Figure Skating did not allow American skaters to compete on the Junior Grand Prix because of security concerns following the September 11, 2001 attacks. Bradley placed 7th at the 2002 U.S. Championships. He went on to the 2002 World Junior Championships and placed 15th.

In the 2002-2003 season, Bradley competed at the Karl Schäfer Memorial, placing 4th. He made his Grand Prix debut at the 2003 Skate Canada International, where he placed 6th. He was 9th at the 2003 U.S. Championships.

In the 2003-2004 season, he placed 6th at the 2004 U.S. Championships. He made his senior ISU Championship debut at the 2004 Four Continents, where he placed 11th.

Bradley missed most of the 2004-2005 season after breaking his arm while playing dodgeball; he had a spiral fracture in his right humerus and was off the ice for six months.

He competed in the 2005-2006 season, hoping to contend for a spot to the 2006 Winter Olympics. He placed 8th at the 2006 U.S. Championships.

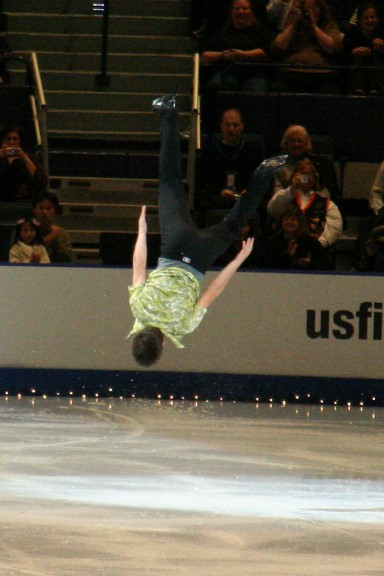
Bradley performing a back flip in exhibition at the 2006 Skate America

In the 2006-2007 season, Bradley was given a host invitation to the 2006 Skate America due to the retirement of skaters who had placed ahead of him. Bradley placed 8th.

Bradley accidentally cut his shin with his blade three weeks before the 2007 U.S. Championships. At the event, he held 3rd place after the short program. He skated last in the free skate, and won the silver medal. Upon learning that he had won the silver, Bradley skated back onto the ice and performed a back-flip for the crowd. Bradley went on to the 2007 Four Continents, held at his home rink, the World Arena in Colorado Springs, Colorado, where he placed fourth. During the off-season, he dealt with a torn meniscus in his right knee.

In the 2007-2008 season, Bradley competed on the Grand Prix circuit with a 6th place finish at the 2007 Skate America and 5th at the 2007 Trophée Éric Bompard. He finished 5th at the 2008 U.S. Championships.

Bradley began the 2008-2009 season at the 2008 Skate Canada International, where he won the silver medal. He then placed 7th at 2008 Trophée Éric Bompard. At the 2009 U.S. Championships, Bradley finished 4th. He was added to the U.S. team to the 2010 World Championships after Evan Lysacek withdrew. Before the event, Bradley broke the fifth metatarsal in his left foot, but was cleared to compete. He finished 18th.

Bradley had initially planned to retire from competitive skating, but decided to resume training in mid-October. He missed the Grand Prix season, but competed at the 2011 U.S. Championships. Bradley won the short program and placed fourth in the free skate to win the overall competition and become the U.S. National Champion for the first time in his career. He was selected to compete at the 2011 World Championships.

On May 10, 2011, Bradley announced his retirement from competitive skating.

He was coached by Tom Zakrajsek for 22 years.

== Programs ==
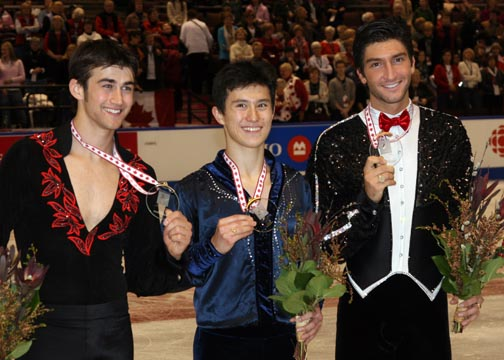
Bradley at the 2008 Skate Canada

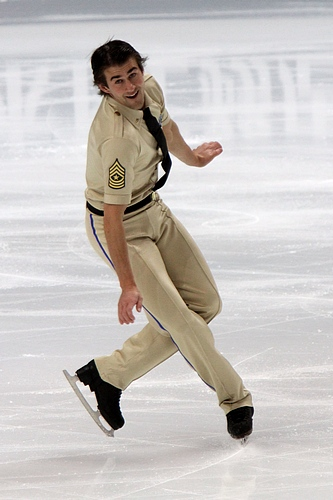
Bradley performs his short program at the 2011 World Championships.

Season	Short program	Free skate	Exhibition	Ref.
2000-01	Dance of the Tumblers By Nikolai Rimsky-Korsakov	William Tell Overture By Gioachino Rossini	—N/a	
2003–04	"Theme from New York, New York" By Frank Sinatra	"Dueling Banjos"; "The Devil Went Down to Georgia"	—N/a	
2004–05	"Theme from New York, New York" By Frank Sinatra	Music from The Untouchables By Ennio Morricone	—N/a	
2005–06	Music from Zorba the Greek	Music from Saturday Night Fever	—N/a	
2006–07	Polka; Happy Birthday Variations By Gigon Kramer Choreo. by Nikolai Morozov	"Mambo en Sax"; "Historia de un Amor"; "El Cumbanchero" By Pérez Prado Choreo. by Catarina Lindgren	"Dueling Banjos"; "The Devil Went Down to Georgia"	
2007–08	Music from The Godfather By Nino Rota	Charlie Chaplin medley	"Money" By Pink Floyd	
2008–09	Elvis Presley medley; 1. "Jailhouse Rock"; 2. "Heartbreak Hotel"; 3. "You Ain't Nothin' But A Hound Dog" Performed by Christopher West	"Mambo en Sax"; "Historia de un Amor"; "El Cumbanchero"	—N/a	
2009–10	"Dark Eyes" Performed by Nika Leoni & Sergei Trofanov	Mozart medley	—N/a	
2010–11	"Boogie Woogie Bugle Boy"	Mozart medley	Music from Willy Wonka & the Chocolate Factory; "Dream On" By Aerosmith; "Theme from New York, New York"	

== Competitive highlights ==
- GP – Event of the ISU Grand Prix Series
- JGP – Event of the ISU Junior Grand Prix Series

Competition placements at senior level
Season	1999–2000	2000–01	2001–02	2002–03	2003–04	2005–06	2006–07	2007–08	2008–09	2009–10	2010–11
World Championships							15th			18th	13th
Four Continents Championships					11th		4th			5th	
U.S. Championships	7th	9th	7th	9th	6th	8th	2nd	5th	4th	4th	1st
GP Skate America							8th	6th		3rd	
GP Skate Canada				6th					2nd		
GP Trophée Éric Bompard								5th	7th	9th	
Golden Spin of Zagreb		1st									
Karl Schäfer Memorial				4th							
Nebelhorn Trophy										4th	

Competition placements at junior level
Season	1997–98	1998–99	1999–2000	2000–01	2001–02
World Junior Championships		10th	5th		15th
U.S. Championships		1st			
Junior Grand Prix Final		8th	5th	5th	
JGP Canada			2nd		
JGP France		2nd			
JGP Hungary		3rd			
JGP Mexico				1st	
JGP Poland				1st	
JGP Sweden			3rd		
Gardena Spring Trophy		1st			
Triglav Trophy	1st				

== Detailed results ==
ISU personal best scores in the +3/-3 GOE System
Segment	Type	Score	Event
Total	TSS	212.75	2008 Skate Canada International
Short program	TSS	72.50	2008 Skate Canada International
Short program	TES	42.70	2008 Skate Canada International
Short program	PCS	31.70	2010 Four Continents Championships
Free skating	TSS	145.97	2010 Four Continents Championships
Free skating	TES	75.17	2010 Four Continents Championships
Free skating	PCS	70.80	2010 Four Continents Championships

- At national events in the United States, pewter medals are awarded for fourth place.

=== Senior level ===
Results in the 1999–2000 season
Date	Event	SP		FS		Total	
Date	Event	P	Score	P	Score	P	Score
Feb 6–13, 2000	(United States) 2000 U.S. Championships	6	—N/a	7	—N/a	7	—N/a

Results in the 2000–01 season
Date	Event	SP		FS		Total	
Date	Event	P	Score	P	Score	P	Score
Jan 14–21, 2001	(United States) 2001 U.S. Championships	8	—N/a	10	—N/a	9	—N/a

Results in the 2001–02 season
Date	Event	SP		FS		Total	
Date	Event	P	Score	P	Score	P	Score
Jan 6–13, 2002	(United States) 2002 U.S. Championships	8	—N/a	7	—N/a	7	—N/a

Results in the 2002–03 season
Date	Event	SP		FS		Total	
Date	Event	P	Score	P	Score	P	Score
Oct 15–19, 2002	(Germany) 2002 Karl Schäfer Memorial	5	—N/a	3	—N/a	4	—N/a
Oct 31 – Nov 3, 2002	2002 Skate Canada International	7	—N/a	6	—N/a	6	—N/a
Jan 12–19, 2003	(United States) 2003 U.S. Championships	15	—N/a	9	—N/a	9	—N/a

Results in the 2003–04 season
Date	Event	SP		FS		Total	
Date	Event	P	Score	P	Score	P	Score
Jan 3–11, 2004	(United States) 2004 U.S. Championships	5	—N/a	6	—N/a	6	—N/a
Jan 19–25, 2004	(Canada) 2004 Four Continents Championships	11	—N/a	10	—N/a	11	—N/a

Results in the 2005–06 season
Date	Event	SP		FS		Total	
Date	Event	P	Score	P	Score	P	Score
Jan 7–15, 2006	(United States) 2006 U.S. Championships	6	69.33	9	130.17	8	199.50

Results in the 2006–07 season
Date	Event	SP		FS		Total	
Date	Event	P	Score	P	Score	P	Score
Oct 26–29, 2006	(United States) 2006 Skate America	4	64.44	9	107.85	8	172.29
Jan 21–28, 2007	(United States) 2007 U.S. Championships	3	73.58	2	145.63	2	219.21
Feb 7–10, 2007	(United States) 2007 Four Continents Championships	3	68.83	5	127.46	4	196.29
Mar 20–25, 2007	(Japan) 2007 World Championships	19	62.88	13	126.02	15	188.90

Results in the 2007–08 season
Date	Event	SP		FS		Total	
Date	Event	P	Score	P	Score	P	Score
Oct 25–28, 2007	(United States) 2007 Skate America	8	58.69	6	122.97	6	181.66
Nov 15–18, 2007	(France) 2008 Trophée Éric Bompard	7	59.13	5	132.19	5	191.32
Jan 20–27, 2008	(United States) 2008 U.S. Championships	4	74.20	5	147.11	5	221.31

Results in the 2008–09 season
Date	Event	SP		FS		Total	
Date	Event	P	Score	P	Score	P	Score
Oct 30 – Nov 2, 2008	2008 Skate Canada International	3	72.50	2	140.25	2	212.75
Nov 13–16, 2008	(France) 2008 Trophée Éric Bompard	5	69.35	10	106.27	7	175.62
Jan 18–25, 2009	(United States) 2009 U.S. Championships	5	74.05	3	147.35	4	221.40

Results in the 2009–10 season
Date	Event	SP		FS		Total	
Date	Event	P	Score	P	Score	P	Score
Sep 23–26, 2009	(Germany) 2009 Nebelhorn Trophy	3	68.18	6	127.50	4	195.68
Oct 15–18, 2009	(France) 2009 Trophée Éric Bompard	8	65.21	10	112.44	9	177.65
Nov 12–15, 2009	(United States) 2009 Skate America	8	59.24	2	138.88	3	198.12
Jan 14–24, 2010	(United States) 2010 U.S. Championships	6	70.63	2	155.34	4	225.97
Jan 27–30, 2010	(South Korea) 2010 Four Continents Championships	8	66.22	3	145.97	5	212.19
Mar 22–28, 2010	(Italy) 2010 World Championships	21	56.10	17	123.14	18	179.24

Results in the 2010–11 season
Date	Event	SP		FS		Total	
Date	Event	P	Score	P	Score	P	Score
Jan 22–30, 2011	(United States) 2011 U.S. Championships	1	80.39	4	151.51	1	231.90
Apr 25 – May 1, 2011	(Russia) 2011 World Championships	12	70.45	12	142.26	13	212.71

=== Junior level ===
Results in the 1998–99 season
Date	Event	SP		FS		Total	
Date	Event	P	Score	P	Score	P	Score
Apr 8–12, 1998	(Slovenia) 1998 Triglav Trophy	2	—N/a	1	—N/a	1	—N/a

Results in the 1998–99 season
Date	Event	SP		FS		Total	
Date	Event	P	Score	P	Score	P	Score
Aug 19–22, 1998	1999 JGP France	2	—N/a	2	—N/a	2	—N/a
Oct 14–18, 1998	1999 JGP Hungary	2	—N/a	3	—N/a	3	—N/a
Nov 21–29, 1998	(Croatia) 1999 World Junior Championships	12	—N/a	10	—N/a	10	—N/a
Feb 7–14, 1999	(United States) 1999 U.S. Championships (Junior)	1	—N/a	1	—N/a	1	—N/a
Mar 23–27, 1999	(Italy) 1999 Gardena Spring Trophy	1	—N/a	1	—N/a	1	—N/a

Results in the 1999–2000 season
Date	Event	SP		FS		Total	
Date	Event	P	Score	P	Score	P	Score
Sep 29 – Oct 3, 1999	1999 JGP Canada	2	—N/a	2	—N/a	2	—N/a
Nov 3–7, 1999	1999 JGP Sweden	3	—N/a	4	—N/a	3	—N/a
Dec 16–19, 1999	(Poland) 1999–2000 Junior Grand Prix Final	7	—N/a	4	—N/a	5	—N/a
Mar 5–12, 2000	(Germany) 2000 World Junior Championships	5	—N/a	5	—N/a	5	—N/a

Results in the 2000–01 season
Date	Event	SP		FS		Total	
Date	Event	P	Score	P	Score	P	Score
Sep 14–17, 2000	2000 JGP Mexico	1	—N/a	1	—N/a	1	—N/a
Oct 26–29, 2000	2000 JGP Poland	3	—N/a	1	—N/a	1	—N/a
Nov 8–12, 2000	(Croatia) 2000 Golden Spin of Zagreb		—N/a		—N/a	1	—N/a
Dec 14–17, 2000	(United Kingdom) 2000–01 Junior Grand Prix Final	8	—N/a	5	—N/a	5	—N/a

Results in the 2001–02 season
Date	Event	SP		FS		Total	
Date	Event	P	Score	P	Score	P	Score
Mar 3–10, 2002	(Norway) 2002 World Junior Championships	15	—N/a	15	—N/a	15	—N/a
