= Christopher Toland =

American figure skater (born 1985)

Christopher Toland (born June 21, 1985 in San Francisco, California) is an American former competitive figure skater. He is the 2004 Nebelhorn Trophy bronze medalist and the 2004 U.S. national junior champion. He was coached by Ken Congemi.

== Results ==
International
Event	02–03	03–04	04–05
Nebelhorn Trophy			3rd
JGP Czech Republic		10th J	
Triglav Trophy	6th J		
National
U.S. Championships	4th J	1st J	
