= John Bevan (figure skater) =

American figure skater

Personal information
- Other names: Johnnie Bevan
- Born: November 1, 1976 (age 49)
- Home town: Spokane, Washington, U.S.

Figure skating career
- Country: United States
- Discipline: Men's singles, Pairs
- Partner: Jacqueline Matson
- Coach: Frank Carroll; Joan Bellessa
- Skating club: Lilac City FSC
- Began skating: c. 1979
- Retired: c. 2002

John "Johnnie" Bevan (born November 1, 1976) is an American former competitive figure skater. He finished in the top six at two World Junior Championships.

== Personal life ==
Bevan was born on November 1, 1976. He married Kathy Larsen, with whom he has three children, Charlie, Kendall and Drew.

== Career ==
Bevan began skating at age three and began to "work hard at it" at age six. However, he finished in last place in his first competition. Early in his career, Bevan was coached by Joan Bellessa at the Lilac City FSC in Spokane, Washington. In 1991, Bevan won the Northwest, Pacific Coast, and U.S. novice men's championships. Competing in men's singles, he won the U.S. junior national bronze medal in 1993 and 1994 after a fourth-place finish in 1992. He placed fourth at the 1993 World Junior Championships in Seoul, South Korea, and sixth at the 1994 World Junior Championships in Colorado Springs, Colorado.

Bevan withdrew from the 1995 World Junior Championships in Budapest, Hungary. By 2000, he was coached by Frank Carroll in El Segundo, California.

Bevan competed briefly in pair skating with Jacqueline Matson. They placed 11th in junior pairs at the 2002 U.S. Championships.

== Competitive highlights ==
International
Event	91–92	92–93	93–94	94–95	95–96	99–00	00–01
Junior Worlds		4th	6th	WD			
Blue Swords	2nd J						
National
U.S. Champ.	4th J	3rd J	3rd J		10th	10th	17th
