= Timothy Goebel =

American figure skater

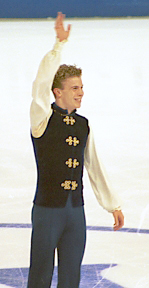
- Goebel competes at the 2001 Grand Prix Final in Kitchener, Ontario.

Personal information
- Full name: Timothy Richard Goebel
- Born: September 10, 1980 (age 46) Evanston, Illinois, U.S.
- Home town: Fairfax, Virginia, U.S.
- Height: 5 ft 7 in (1.70 m)

Figure skating career
- Country: United States
- Discipline: Men's singles
- Retired: April 25, 2006
Event	Gold medal – first place	Silver medal – second place	Bronze medal – third place
Olympic Games	0	0	1
World Championships	0	2	0
Grand Prix Final	0	0	2
U.S. Championships	1	4	1
World Junior Championships	0	1	0
Junior Grand Prix Final	1	0	0
Medal list
Olympic Games
Bronze medal – third place	2002 Salt Lake City	Singles
World Championships
Silver medal – second place	2002 Nagano	Singles
Silver medal – second place	2003 Washington, D.C.	Singles
Grand Prix Final
Bronze medal – third place	1999–2000 Lyon	Singles
Bronze medal – third place	2001–02 Kitchener	Singles
U.S. Championships
Gold medal – first place	2001 Boston	Singles
Silver medal – second place	2000 Cleveland	Singles
Silver medal – second place	2002 Los Angeles	Singles
Silver medal – second place	2003 Dallas	Singles
Silver medal – second place	2005 Portland	Singles
Bronze medal – third place	1999 Salt Lake City	Singles
World Junior Championships
Silver medal – second place	1997 Seoul	Singles
Junior Grand Prix Final
Gold medal – first place	1997–98 Lausanne	Singles

Timothy Richard Goebel (born September 10, 1980) is an American former competitive figure skater. He is the 2002 Olympic bronze medalist. He was the first person to land a quadruple Salchow jump in competition and the first person to land three quadruple jumps in one program. He landed 76 career quadruple jumps before his retirement in 2006.

== Early life ==
Goebel was born on September 10, 1980, in Evanston, Illinois. He was adopted through Catholic Charities by Ginny and Richard Goebel as an infant.

== Career ==
Early in his career, Goebel was coached by Carol Heiss Jenkins and Glyn Watts near his Illinois home and then moved to California to work with Frank Carroll.

During his skating career and prior to the arrival of Nathan Chen to the sport, Goebel was sometimes referred to as the "Quad King" because of his ability to land quadruple jumps. On March 7, 1998, in Lausanne, Switzerland, at the Junior Grand Prix Final, Goebel became the first skater in the world to land a quadruple Salchow, and the first American skater to land a quadruple jump of any kind in competition. International Skating Union officials ratified the jump at the end of the month after watching a video provided by the parents of Tiffany Stiegler / Johnnie Stiegler.

On October 31, 1999, at the 1999 Skate America in Colorado Springs, Goebel became the first skater to land three quads in one program. In the free skate, he landed a quad Salchow in combination, a quad toe loop, and a quad Salchow as a solo jump.

Goebel also made history at the 2002 Olympics by becoming the first skater to successfully land a quad Salchow in combination in Olympic competition. Goebel's repertoire of quadruple jumps made him one of the most competitive skaters in the world during the peak of his career. He would land a total of 76 quads in competition. Goebel was heavily criticized early in his career for focusing exclusively on jumping to the detriment of choreography and presentation, but in later years he improved in those areas.

Goebel increasingly struggled with his jumps after 2003 due to injuries. At the 2006 U.S. Championships, in what he had previously announced would be his last competitive season, he was unable to land either a quadruple jump or triple Axel cleanly, and dropped to a seventh-place finish which left him far short of qualifying for the 2006 Winter Olympics.

Goebel represented the Winterhurst Figure Skating Club. He was coached by Audrey Weisiger in Fairfax, Virginia, after having been previously coached by Carol Heiss Jenkins, Glyn Watts and Frank Carroll.

On April 25, 2006, Goebel announced his retirement from competitive skating. He planned to continue to contribute to the sport as a technical specialist, having received certification for competitions sanctioned by the United States Figure Skating Association. He worked as a technical specialist at the Aviator Figure Skating Academy in New York.

== Personal life ==
Goebel initially attended Loyola Marymount University. Beginning in the fall of 2006, he studied at Columbia University's School of General Studies, graduating in May 2010 with a bachelor's degree in mathematics. After working for the Nielsen ratings company, he joined an ad agency, MEC, as a consumer analyst. In 2016, he received a Master of Science in Business Analytics degree from New York University Stern School of Business, and currently works for Google as a Marketing Mix Modeling Partner Program Manager.

In April 2016, Goebel became engaged to his boyfriend of three years, Thomas Luciano. They married on April 29, 2017, in Newport, Rhode Island.

== Programs ==
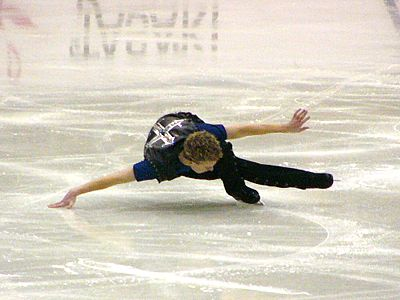
Goebel performs a hydroblade, one of his signature moves, in 2003.

Season	Short program	Free skating	Exhibition
2005–2006	Sing, Sing, Sing by Benny Goodman	Night on Bald Mountain by Modest Mussorgsky	Stray Cats Strut by Brian Setzer
2004–2005	Concerto Elegiaque for Piano in D Minor by Sergei Rachmaninoff	The Queen Symphony by Tolga Kashif, Royal Philharmonic Orchestra	
2003–2004	Romeo and Juliet by Sergei Prokofiev	The Queen Symphony by Tolga Kashif, Royal Philharmonic Orchestra	
2002–2003	Romeo and Juliet by Sergei Prokofiev	Rapsodia Espanola, Tango Op. 65 N. 2 by Espanola; Fantasticas by J. Turina	
2001–2002	Danse macabre by Camille Saint-Saëns	An American in Paris by George Gershwin	American Pie by Don Mclean; Freedom by Paul McCartney
2000–2001	2001: A Space Odyssey; Also sprach Zarathustra by Richard Strauss; Slow Waltz	Henry V; Canone inverso; Second free at Grand Prix Final: 1812 Overture by Pyotr Tchaikovsky	The Windmills of Your Mind by Neil Diamond; American Pie by Don Mclean; Cup of Life by Ricky Martin
1999–2000	Caravan by Duke Ellington	Seven Years in Tibet by John Williams	Ain't No Sunshine by David Sanborn, Sting

== Competitive highlights ==
- GP – Event of the ISU Grand Prix Series
- JGP – Event of the ISU Junior Grand Prix Series
- WD – Withdrew from competition

Competition placements at senior level
Season	1996–97	1997–98	1998–99	1999–2000	2000–01	2001–02	2002–03	2003–04	2004–05	2005–06
Winter Olympics						3rd				
World Championships			12th	11th	4th	2nd	2nd		10th	
Four Continents Championships			13th							
Grand Prix Final				3rd	5th	3rd				
U.S. Championships	6th	WD	3rd	2nd	1st	2nd	2nd	WD	2nd	7th
GP Cup of China								1st		
GP France										4th
GP NHK Trophy				2nd				2nd	2nd	
GP Skate America				2nd	1st	1st				6th
GP Sparkassen					2nd	2nd				
Nebelhorn Trophy		1st								
St. Gervais	2nd									

Competition placements at junior level
Season	1994–95	1995–96	1996–97	1997–98
World Junior Championships	14th	7th	2nd	WD
Junior Grand Prix Final				1st
U.S. Championships	5th	1st		
JGP France				1st
JGP Ukraine				1st
Blue Swords	4th		2nd	

== Detailed results ==
ISU personal best scores in the +3/-3 GOE System
Segment	Type	Score	Event
Total	TSS	208.28	2004 NHK Trophy
Short program	TSS	73.65	2003 NHK Trophy
Short program	TES		
Short program	PCS		
Free skating	TSS	137.60	2003 Cup of China
Free skating	TES		
Free skating	PCS		

=== Senior level ===
Results in the 1996–97 season
Date	Event	SP		FS		Total	
Date	Event	P	Score	P	Score	P	Score
Aug 23–28, 1996	(France) 1996 Grand Prix International St. Gervais		–		–	2	–
Jan 13–21, 1996	(United States) 1997 U.S. Championships	10	–	6	–	6	–

Results in the 1997–98 season
Date	Event	SP		FS		Total	
Date	Event	P	Score	P	Score	P	Score
Aug 26–29, 1997	(Germany) 1997 Nebelhorn Trophy	1	–	1	–	1	–

Results in the 1998–99 season
Date	Event	SP		FS		Total	
Date	Event	P	Score	P	Score	P	Score
Feb 7–14, 1999	(United States) 1999 U.S. Championships	2	–	3	–	3	–
Feb 21–28, 1999	(Canada) 1999 Four Continents Championships	12	–	13	–	13	–
Mar 20–28, 1999	(Finland) 1999 World Championships	13	–	12	–	12	–

Results in the 1999–2000 season
Date	Event	SP		FS		Total	
Date	Event	P	Score	P	Score	P	Score
Oct 27–31, 1999	(United States) 1999 Skate America	3	–	2	–	2	–
Dec 2–5, 1999	(Japan) 1999 NHK Trophy	2	–	2	–	2	–
Jan 13–16, 2000	(France) 1999–2000 Grand Prix Final	5	–	4	–	3	–
Feb 6–13, 2000	(United States) 2000 U.S. Championships	2	–	2	–	2	–
Mar 23 – Apr 3, 2000	(France) 2000 World Championships	7	–	10	–	11	–

Results in the 2000–01 season
Date	Event	SP		FS		Total	
Date	Event	P	Score	P	Score	P	Score
Oct 26–29, 2000	(United States) 2000 Skate America	2	–	1	–	1	–
Nov 9–12, 2000	(Germany) 2000 Sparkassen Cup on Ice	2	–	2	–	2	–
Feb 15–18, 2001	(Japan) 2000–01 Grand Prix Final	5	–	5	–	5	–
Jan 14–21, 2001	(United States) 2001 U.S. Championships	3	–	1	–	1	–
Mar 17–25, 2001	(Canada) 2001 World Championships	4	–	4	–	4	–

Results in the 2001–02 season
Date	Event	SP		FS		Total	
Date	Event	P	Score	P	Score	P	Score
Oct 24–28, 2001	(United States) 2001 Skate America	1	–	1	–	1	–
Nov 9–11, 2001	(Germany) 2001 Sparkassen Cup on Ice	2	–	2	–	2	–
Dec 13–16, 2001	(Canada) 2001–02 Grand Prix Final	3	–	3	–	3	–
Jan 6–13, 2002	(United States) 2002 U.S. Championships	1	–	2	–	2	–
Feb 9–21, 2002	(United States) 2002 Winter Olympics	3	–	3	–	3	–
Mar 16–24, 2002	(Japan) 2002 World Championships	4	–	2	–	2	–

Results in the 2002–03 season
Date	Event	SP		FS		Total	
Date	Event	P	Score	P	Score	P	Score
Jan 6–13, 2003	(United States) 2003 U.S. Championships	1	–	3	–	2	–
Mar 24–30, 2003	(United States) 2003 World Championships	2	–	2	–	2	–

Results in the 2003–04 season
Date	Event	SP		FS		Total	
Date	Event	P	Score	P	Score	P	Score
Nov 6–9, 2003	2003 Cup of China	2	–	1	–	1	–
Nov 27–30, 2003	(Japan) 2003 NHK Trophy	1	–	2	–	2	–

Results in the 2004–05 season
Date	Event	SP		FS		Total	
Date	Event	P	Score	P	Score	P	Score
Nov 4–7, 2004	(Japan) 2004 NHK Trophy	2	–	2	–	2	–
Jan 9–16, 2005	(United States) 2005 U.S. Championships	1	–	2	–	2	–
Mar 14–20, 2005	(Russia) 2005 World Championships	14	–	9	–	10	–

Results in the 2005–06 season
Date	Event	SP		FS		Total	
Date	Event	P	Score	P	Score	P	Score
Oct 20–23, 2005	(United States) 2005 Skate America	6	–	8	–	6	–
Nov 17–20, 2005	(France) 2005 Trophée Éric Bompard	4	–	6	–	4	–
Jan 7–15, 2006	(United States) 2006 U.S. Championships	5	–	8	–	7	–

=== Junior level ===
Results in the 1994–95 season
Date	Event	SP		FS		Total	
Date	Event	P	Score	P	Score	P	Score
Nov 21–27, 1994	(Hungary) 1995 World Junior Championships	17	–	12	–	14	–
Jan 6–13, 1995	(United States) 1995 U.S. Championships (Junior)	6	–	5	–	5	–

Results in the 1995–96 season
Date	Event	SP		FS		Total	
Date	Event	P	Score	P	Score	P	Score
Nov 26 – Dec 2, 1995	(Australia) 1996 World Junior Championships	12	–	6	–	7	–
Jan 13–21, 1996	(United States) 1996 U.S. Championships (Junior)	1	–	1	–	1	–

Results in the 1996–97 season
Date	Event	SP		FS		Total	
Date	Event	P	Score	P	Score	P	Score
Nov 24 – Dec 1, 1996	(South Korea) 1997 World Junior Championships	5	–	2	–	2	–

Results in the 1997–98 season
Date	Event	SP		FS		Total	
Date	Event	P	Score	P	Score	P	Score
Aug 19–23, 1997	(France) 1997 JS Grand Prix de Saint Gervais		–		–	1	–
Sep 25–28, 1997	(Ukraine) 1997 JS Ukrainian Souvenir		–		–	1	–
Mar 5–8, 1998	(Switzerland) 1997–98 Junior Series Final	4	–	1	–	1	–
