= Jane Bugaeva =

American figure skater

Personal information
- Born: August 26, 1986 (age 39) Saint Petersburg, Russia
- Home town: Raleigh, North Carolina, United States
- Height: 5 ft 1 in (155 cm)

Figure skating career
- Country: United States
- Coach: Kathie Kader
- Skating club: SC of North Carolina

Jane Bugaeva (born August 26, 1986 in Saint Petersburg, Russia) is an American figure skater. She won the gold medal at the 2004 Bofrost Cup on Ice, her first senior international event. She won the silver medal at the 2004 Junior Grand Prix event in Belgrade and just missed qualifying for the Junior Grand Prix Final. She became a U.S. citizen around 2007.

== Results ==
International
Event	2002–03	2003–04	2004–05	2005–06
Bofrost Cup on Ice			1st	
Nebelhorn Trophy			10th	
International: Junior
JGP Czech Republic		6th		
JGP Romania			4th	
JGP Serbia			2nd	
Triglav Trophy	3rd J			
National
U.S. Championships	5th J	9th	12th	13th
J = Junior level
