= Rena Inoue =

Japanese-born American pair skater

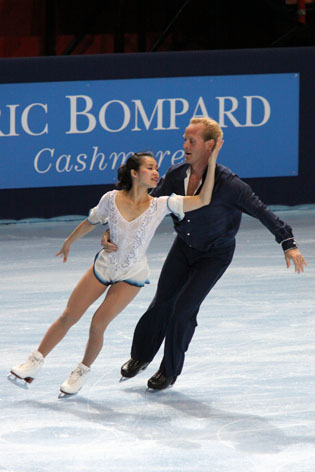
- Rena Inoue and John Baldwin

Personal information
- Native name: 井上 怜奈
- Born: October 17, 1976 (age 50) Nishinomiya, Hyogo, Japan
- Home town: Santa Monica, California, U.S.
- Height: 4 ft 11 in (1.49 m)

Figure skating career
- Country: United States (since 2000); Japan (before 2000)
- Partner: John Baldwin (since 2000); Tomoaki Koyama (before 2000)
- Coach: Jenni Meno; Todd Sand; Philipp Mills; Peter Oppegard; Oksana Grishuk; Jill Watson
- Skating club: All Year FSC
- Began skating: 1980
- Retired: 2010
Medal record
Figure skating – Pairs
Representing United States
Four Continents Championships
Gold medal – first place	2006 Colorado Springs	Pairs
Bronze medal – third place	2007 Colorado Springs	Pairs
Ladies' figure skating
Representing Japan
Winter Universiade
Silver medal – second place	1997 Muju	Ladies' singles

Rena Inoue (井上 怜奈, Inoue Rena; born October 17, 1976) is a Japanese-born American retired pair skater. With partner John Baldwin, she is the 2004 and 2006 U.S. National Champion. Inoue previously competed for Japan as both a single skater and pair skater. Inoue and Baldwin are the first skaters to perform a throw triple Axel in competition.

== Personal life ==
Rena Inoue was born in Nishinomiya, Hyōgo, Japan. She moved to the United States in 1996 at the urging of her father, who had been diagnosed with lung cancer. In 1998, less than two years after her father's death, Inoue was also diagnosed with lung cancer. It was detected early, and after six months of chemotherapy, she was cancer-free.

Inoue graduated from Waseda University in 1999 with a degree in education. She became a U.S. citizen in 2005. Inoue became engaged to be married to skating partner John Baldwin in January 2008. Their daughter was born November 2011.

== Career ==
=== Competing for Japan ===
Rena Inoue began skating at age four. She competed in the disciplines of single skating and pair skating in Japan. As a single skater, Inoue is the 1994 Japanese silver medalist and 1998 bronze medalist. She represented Japan at the 1994 Winter Olympics in singles and placed 18th. She competed for Japan in singles through 1999.

As a pair skater, Inoue competed with Tomoaki Koyama. They were the 1991 and 1992 Japanese national champions. They represented Japan at the 1992 Winter Olympics and placed 14th.

=== Competing for the United States ===
While living in the United States, Inoue was paired with John Baldwin by his father, a coach. Inoue and Baldwin tried out and agreed to form the partnership. They began competing together in 2000.

They placed 11th at the 2001 U.S. Championships. The following season, they won the pewter medal at the 2002 U.S. Championships. They were sent to the 2002 Four Continents, their first international competition together, and placed 7th.

In the 2002–2003 season, Inoue / Baldwin competed on the Grand Prix circuit for the first time. Returning to Nationals, they won the bronze medal. They withdrew from the 2003 Four Continents, but placed 10th at the 2003 World Championships.

In the 2003–2004 season, they improved on their Grand Prix results and won their first national title. They placed 4th at the 2004 Four Continents and repeated their 10th-place finish at the 2004 World Championships.

In the 2004–2005 season, they medalled for the first time on the Grand Prix and qualified for the Grand Prix Final, where they placed 6th. They won the silver medal at the 2005 U.S. Figure Skating Championships and placed 11th at the 2005 World Championships.

In the 2005–2006 season, Inoue / Baldwin medalled on the Grand Prix. At the 2006 U.S. Championships, Inoue and Baldwin became the first pair to successfully perform a throw triple Axel in competition. They went on to the 2006 Four Continents, which they won. At the 2006 Winter Olympics, they made Olympic and international history when they landed the throw triple Axel for the first time in international competition. They placed 7th overall. At the 2006 World Figure Skating Championships, they placed 4th.

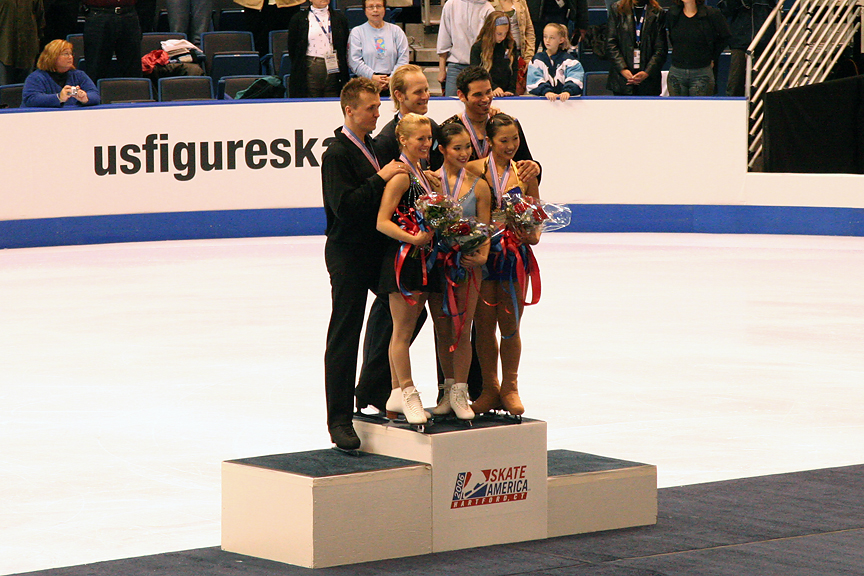
Inoue / Baldwin on the podium at the 2006 Skate America.

In the 2006–2007 season, Inoue / Baldwin won the gold medal at the 2006 Skate America after winning the short program and placing second in the free skate. They won the silver medal at 2006 Skate Canada International the next week; and then won the silver at 2006 Trophée Eric Bompard one week later. They qualified for the Grand Prix Final. While in Saint Petersburg for that competition, Baldwin was abducted, assaulted and robbed, though he and Inoue were still able to compete, and finished fourth. At the 2007 U.S. Championships, they won the silver medal. They placed 8th at the 2007 World Championships.

In the 2007–2008 season, Inoue / Baldwin sat out the Grand Prix series, choosing to skate in shows instead. Returning to competition at the 2008 U.S. Championships, they won the silver medal. While they were taking their bows following their free skate, Baldwin proposed marriage to Inoue on the ice and she accepted. Inoue / Baldwin competed at the 2008 World Championships, where they placed 10th.

Inoue / Baldwin were 5th at the 2008 Skate America and won the silver medal at the 2008 NHK Trophy.

== Programs ==
(with Baldwin)

Season	Short program	Free skating
2009–2010	Tango de los Exilados by Walter Taieb and Vanessa Mae	Concert for Piano No. 1 by Peter I. Tchaikovski
2008–2009	Illumination by Secret Garden	Pompei by E. S. Posthumous
2007–2008	Beethoven's Last Night by Trans-Siberian Orchestra	Pompei by E. S. Posthumous
2006–2007	The Soul of Spain	Selection by Giacomo Puccini
2005–2006	Adagio in G minor by Remo Giazotto, Tomaso Albinoni	Selection by Dmitri Shostakovich
2004–2005	Bird of Fire Orchestra: Salsoul	Selection by Trans-Siberian Orchestra
2003–2004	Murder at the Cotton Club by Erik Ekstrand Ensemble	Wonders of the New World by Elton John; Pearl Harbor by Hans Zimmer
2002–2003	Carmen by Doc Severenson London Philharmonic Orchestra	Brazil by Michael Kamen The National Philharmonic Orchestra of London
2001–2002	Millenium	Brazil by Michael Kamen The National Philharmonic Orchestra of London

== Competitive highlights ==
GP: Champions Series / Grand Prix

=== Pairs career with John Baldwin for the United States ===
International
Event	00–01	01–02	02–03	03–04	04–05	05–06	06–07	07–08	08–09	09–10
Olympics						7th				
Worlds			10th	10th	11th	4th	8th	10th		
Four Continents		7th		4th		1st	3rd	4th	7th	
GP Final					6th		4th			
GP Bofrost Cup			5th							
GP Bompard						4th	2nd			4th
GP Cup of China				5th						
GP Cup of Russia			5th							
GP NHK Trophy				4th	4th				2nd	3rd
GP Skate America					3rd	2nd	1st		5th	
GP Skate Canada							2nd			
National
U.S. Champ.	11th	4th	3rd	1st	2nd	1st	2nd	2nd	3rd	3rd

=== Singles career for Japan ===
International
Event	90–91	91–92	92–93	93–94	94–95	95–96	96–97	97–98	98–99
Olympics				18th					
Worlds				13th					
GP Cup of Russia								10th	
GP Nations Cup						7th			
GP Skate America						8th			
GP Skate Canada								9th	
Nations Cup				3rd					
NHK Trophy			11th	8th					
Universiade							2nd		
International: Junior
Junior Worlds	14th			5th					
National
Japan Champ.				2nd	12th	5th	6th	3rd	WD
Japan Jr. Champ.	1st	2nd	1st	2nd					
WD = Withdrew

=== Pairs career with Koyama for Japan ===
International
Event	1987–88	1988–89	1989–90	1990–91	1991–92
Winter Olympics					14th
World Championships				15th	
International de Paris					7th
NHK Trophy					7th
International: Junior
World Junior Championships			7th		
National
Japan Championships				1st	1st
Japan Junior	1st		1st		
