= Elizabeth Kwon =

American figure skater

Elizabeth Kwon (born May 14, 1986) is an American figure skater. She is the 1999 US Junior national pewter medalist and 1998 Novice national champion. Kwon placed 2nd in the 1999 Junior Grand Prix event in Ostrava and seventh in Slovenia. Kwon was forced to retire due to injury. As an intermediate-level skater, Kwon was featured in Christine Brennan's book Edge of Glory. Brennan wrote that Kwon was working on a triple axel.

As of April 2007, Elizabeth is the Inter-collegiate Ladies National Senior Champ. She skates for Miami University (Ohio).

== Results ==
Event	1997–98	1998–99	1999–00	2000–01
United States Championships	1st N.	4th J.	14th	WD
ISU Junior Grand Prix, Czech Republic			2nd	
ISU Junior Grand Prix, Slovenia			7th	

- J = Junior level; N = Novice level
