= Michael Weiss (figure skater) =

American figure skater

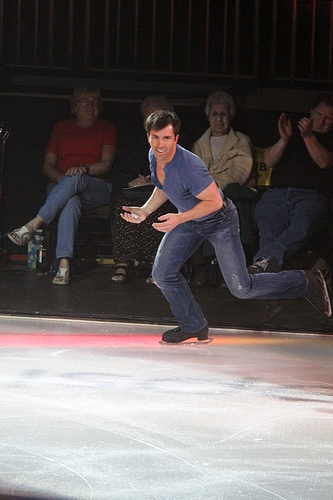
- Weiss performing at Stars on Ice in 2010

Personal information
- Born: August 2, 1976 (age 49) Washington, DC, U.S.
- Home town: McLean, Virginia, U.S.
- Height: 5 ft 8 in (1.73 m)

Figure skating career
- Country: United States
- Discipline: Men's singles
- Began skating: 1985
- Retired: 2006
Event	Gold medal – first place	Silver medal – second place	Bronze medal – third place
World Championships	0	0	2
Four Continents Championships	0	0	1
Grand Prix Final	0	0	1
U.S. Championships	3	3	1
World Junior Championships	1	1	0
Medal list
World Championships
Bronze medal – third place	1999 Helsinki	Singles
Bronze medal – third place	2000 Nice	Singles
Four Continents Championships
Bronze medal – third place	2001 Salt Lake City	Singles
Grand Prix Final
Bronze medal – third place	2003–04 Colorado Springs	Singles
U.S. Championships
Gold medal – first place	1999 Salt Lake City	Singles
Gold medal – first place	2000 Cleveland	Singles
Gold medal – first place	2003 Dallas	Singles
Silver medal – second place	1997 Nashville	Singles
Silver medal – second place	1998 Philadelphia	Singles
Silver medal – second place	2004 Atlanta	Singles
Bronze medal – third place	2002 Los Angeles	Singles
World Junior Championships
Gold medal – first place	1994 Colorado Springs	Singles
Silver medal – second place	1993 Seoul	Singles

Michael Weiss (born August 2, 1976) is an American former competitive and currently professional figure skater. He is in the U.S. Figure Skating Hall of Fame and is a three-time national champion (1999, 2000, 2003) a two-time World bronze medalist (1999, 2000), and a two-time Olympic team member.

== Personal life ==
Michael Weiss was born August 2, 1976, in Washington, DC. His father, Greg, was a gymnast on the 1964 Olympic team, and his mother, Margie, was also a gymnast and national champion. His sister Geremi was a figure skater and junior national silver medalist; his other sister, Genna, was junior world diving champion.

Weiss graduated from Wilbert Tucker Woodson High School in Fairfax, Virginia. He holds an associate degree in business marketing from Prince George's Community College. Weiss was a member of the Phi Theta Kappa Honor Society. In September 1997, he married his jazz dance teacher, Lisa Thornton. Their daughter, Annie-Mae, was born in September 1998 and their son, Christopher Michael, in October 1999.

== Career ==
Weiss began skating in 1986. Audrey Weisiger coached him from the age of nine. Weiss took the silver medal at the 1993 World Junior Championships in Seoul, South Korea and won gold at the 1994 World Junior Championships in Colorado Springs, Colorado.

At the 1997 U.S. Championships, Weiss attempted to become the first American to land the quad toe loop. It was initially believed to have been successful but three hours after the competition, U.S. Figure Skating ruled that the jump had been two-footed and decided not to ratify it. He pulled up from fifth after the short program to take the silver medal behind Todd Eldredge and was sent to Lausanne, Switzerland to compete at his first World Championships, where he finished seventh.

In February 1999, Weiss won his first senior national title at the U.S. Championships in Salt Lake City, Utah. The following month, he was awarded the bronze medal at the 1999 World Championships in Helsinki, Finland. After recovering from a stress fracture in his left ankle, Weiss defended his national title at the 2000 U.S. Championships in Cleveland, Ohio and won bronze at the 2000 World Championships in Nice, France.

Weiss missed part of the 2000–01 season due to a stress fracture in his foot. At the start of the 2002–03 season, Don Laws filled in for Weisiger at the Campbell's Classic. On October 29, 2002, Weiss decided to leave Weisiger to train full-time with Laws.

Weiss competed 19 consecutive years at the U.S. Championships. He was the first American to land a quadruple toe loop in competition. He invented the "Tornado", a backflip with a full twist, and debuted it at the Hallmark Skaters Championship in December 2002. Though not allowed in competition, it is a crowd favorite in exhibitions.

Weiss turned professional in 2006. He toured with Stars On Ice and competed in Ice Wars. Around 2012, he began teaching skating skills to hockey players.

== Michael Weiss Foundation ==
While still an eligible skater, Weiss started the Michael Weiss Foundation, which gives scholarships to up-and-coming figure skaters. Skaters who have received scholarships include Nathan Chen, Adam Rippon, Ashley Wagner, Mirai Nagasu, Madison and Keiffer Hubbell, Daisuke Murakami, and Christine Zukowski.

== Programs ==
Season	Short program	Free skating
2005–2006	Semiramide Overture by Gioachino Rossini; La Donna e Mobile by Giuseppe Verdi	Symphony No 6; Moonlight Sonata; Symphony No 9, Ode of Joy by Ludwig van Beethoven
2004–2005	Henry V by Patrick Doyle	Stairway to Heaven; Bonzo's Montreaux by Led Zeppelin; Unforgiven by Metallica
2003–2004	Henry V by Patrick Doyle	Patriotic medley
2002–2003	Selections by van Halen and Metallica	Malagueña by Ernesto Lecuona; Concierto de Aranjuez by Joaquín Rodrigo; Malagueña by Ernesto Lecuona
2001–2002	Malagueña by Ernesto Lecuona	Che Gelida Manina by Giacomo Puccini; La Tregenda by Giacomo Puccini performed by the Czechoslovak Orchestra; Nessun dorma by Giacomo Puccini performed by the National Opera Orchestra
2000–2001	Taras Bulba by Franz Waxman	William Tell Overture by Gioachino Rossini

== Competitive highlights ==
- GP – Event of the ISU Grand Prix Series

Competition placements at senior level
Season	1993–94	1994–95	1995–96	1996–97	1997–98	1998–99	1999–2000	2000–01	2001–02	2002–03	2003–04	2004–05	2005–06
Winter Olympics					7th				7th				
World Championships				7th	6th	3rd	3rd		6th	5th	6th		
Four Continents Championships								3rd					9th
Grand Prix Final						4th					3rd		
U.S. Championships	8th	6th	5th	2nd	2nd	1st	1st	4th	3rd	1st	2nd	5th	4th
GP Bofrost Cup on Ice		10th			5th				8th	4th			
GP Cup of Russia				3rd	4th			6th			4th		
GP NHK Trophy												4th	
GP Skate America			2nd			2nd	4th		4th	5th	1st	3rd	
GP Skate Canada				6th									
GP Trophée Éric Bompard				3rd		2nd	5th			1st	3rd		6th
Goodwill Games		6th				4th			2nd				
Grand Prix St. Gervais	2nd												
Nebelhorn Trophy	2nd			1st									
Winter Universiade		1st											

Competition placements at junior & senior level
Season	1989–90	1990–91	1991–92	1992–93	1993–94
World Junior Championships				2nd	1st
U.S. Championships			5th J	1st J	
U.S. Championships (Figures)	1st S	2nd S			
