= Ryan Jahnke =

American figure skater

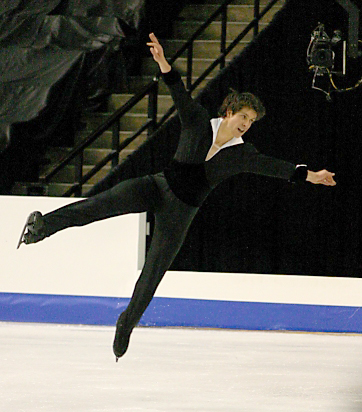
- Jahnke competes in 2004

Personal information
- Born: March 21, 1978 (age 48) Detroit, Michigan, U.S.
- Height: 5 ft 11 in (1.80 m)

Figure skating career
- Country: United States
- Discipline: Men's singles
- Skating club: Broadmoor SC
- Began skating: 1985
- Retired: 2006
Medal record
U.S. Championships
Bronze medal – third place	2003 Dallas	Men’s singles

Ryan Jahnke (born March 21, 1978) is an American former competitive figure skater. He is the 2004 Skate America silver medalist and 2003 U.S. national bronze medalist.

== Personal life ==
Jahnke was born on March 21, 1978, in Detroit, Michigan. He studied pre-medicine on a four-year academic scholarship at Wayne State University before quitting due to his move to Colorado. He majored in finance and minored in information systems at the University of Colorado, graduating in December 2009. He is fluent in German.

Jahnke married Tashiana Foreman on June 1, 2002. Their son, Zayin Nicholas Jahnke, was born in November 2011.

== Career ==
Jahnke began skating in 1985 because his friends played ice hockey. He won the novice men's title at the 1993 U.S. Championships. Around 1995, he broke two teeth in a skating collision with Dan Hollander while training in St. Clair Shores, Michigan. He was awarded bronze medals competing on the junior level at the 1995 and 1996 U.S. Championships and placed 19th at the 1997 World Junior Championships in Seoul, South Korea.

After training in Michigan under Diana Ronayne, he relocated in 1999 to Colorado Springs, Colorado, where his coach had received a job offer. He placed fifth at the 2000 U.S. Championships. As a result, he was sent to his first senior ISU Championship, the 2000 Four Continents in Osaka, Japan, where he finished 12th.

Jahnke won the bronze medal at the 2003 U.S. Championships and placed 6th at the 2003 Four Continents in Beijing, China. He finished 13th at the 2003 Worlds in Washington, D.C., after ranking third in qualifying group B, 9th in the short program, and 18th in the free skate.

The following season, Jahnke placed fourth at the 2004 U.S. Championships and received a pewter medal. At the 2004 Four Continents in Hamilton, Ontario, Canada, he had the same final placement after ranking fifth in both segments.

Jahnke competed at multiple Grand Prix competitions. At the 2004 Skate America, he placed fourth in the short and first in the free skate, obtaining the silver medal behind Brian Joubert and ahead of Michael Weiss.

Jahnke retired from competitive skating after the 2006 U.S. Championships. He made his professional debut at the 2006 Brian Boitano Skating Spectacular and has also worked as a coach. In 2010, he launched his new website, Myskatingmall.com.

== Programs ==
Season	Short program	Free skating
2005–2006	Search for Vulcan by John Barry	Rodeo by Aaron Copland
2004–2005	Bourree by Jethro Tull	Piano concerto by Edvard Grieg
2003–2004	Prelude No 20 by Frédéric Chopin; Classical Graffiti	Brazilian medley
2002–2003	La Strada by Nino Rota	Cinderella by Sergei Prokofiev
2001–2002	Stairway to Heaven by Led Zeppelin	Tango by Astor Piazzolla
2000–2001	Take Five	Sitar concerto by Ravi Shankar
1999–2000	Danse macabre by Camille Saint-Saëns	Asturias (Leyenda) by Isaac Albéniz
1998–1999	Danse macabre by Camille Saint-Saëns	Medley by Duke Ellington
1997–1998	Vltava by Bedřich Smetana	Medley by Cole Porter

== Competitive highlights ==
=== 1999–2000 to 2005–2006 ===
International
Event	99–00	00–01	01–02	02–03	03–04	04–05	05–06
Worlds				13th			
Four Continents	12th			6th	4th		
GP Final						6th	
GP Cup of China							6th
GP Skate America					12th	2nd	
GP Skate Canada					6th	4th	
GP Trophée Lalique		6th					
Nebelhorn Trophy		8th	9th				
Finlandia Trophy				5th			
National
U.S. Champ.	5th	8th	8th	3rd	4th	13th	6th

=== 1994–1995 to 2004–2005 ===
International
Event	94–95	95–96	96–97	97–98	98–99
St. Gervais		8th			
International: Junior
Junior Worlds			19th		
Blue Swords			14th		
National
U.S. Champ.	3rd J	3rd J	5th J	8th	9th
J = Junior
