= Kakani Katija Young =

American bioengineer

Kakani Katija
- Occupation: Bioengineer
- Years active: 2009–
- Known for: biological fluid mechanics of marine organisms

Kakani Katija is a bioengineer from Hawaii. While earning her Master's and PhD in Aeronautics and Bioengineering, Katija began to study the mechanics of swimming and feeding marine organisms.

== Education ==
Kakani Katija completed her bachelor's degree in Aeronautics and Astronautics at the University of Washington in 2004. She furthered her studies, earning a Master's in Aeronautics in 2005 at the California Institute of Technology (Caltech) and her Doctorate at Caltech in 2010 in Bioengineering. She served as a Postdoctoral Fellow at the Monterey Bay Aquarium Research Institute.

== Career ==
Katija was awarded research fellowships from both the American Society for Engineering Education and the National Science Foundation to conduct graduate research. As a certified research diver, she has conducted field studies in various locations throughout the world, including research completed in 2009 off the coast of the Palau archipelago. The goal of this study was to understand the physics involved in the movement of jellyfish. The science team discovered the jellyfish not only push water into their bells but drag an almost constant flume of water behind them. This discovery led Katija to study how marine life contributes to mixing the ocean. Katija's work also includes understanding how much sea creatures mix fluid in the ocean at rates comparable to winds and tides.

Katija now leads the Bioinspiration lab at the Monterey Bay Aquarium Research Institute in Moss Landing, California, where she has developed DeepPIV, a research tool intended to make conducting experiments in ocean habitats less invasive and improve marine research techniques.

She has participated in two expeditions on board R/V Falkor - Designing the Future and Designing the Future 2 testing the newly developed technologies on board. Imagery from the use of the DeepPIV used on board Schmidt Ocean Institute's R/V Falkor, is available on SketchFab.

== Awards and honors ==
In 2011, she was named an Emerging Explorer at the National Geographic Society, and as part of the award, a research dive in Panama was filmed in 2012 by National Geographic Society featuring her work.

In 2013, she was named a Kavli Research Fellow from the National Academy of Sciences.

In 2023, Katija was awarded the Marine Technology Society's Compass Distinguished Achievement Award, which recognizes individuals who have made significant contributions to the field of marine science and marine technology throughout their careers.
