= John Baldwin (figure skater) =

American figure skater

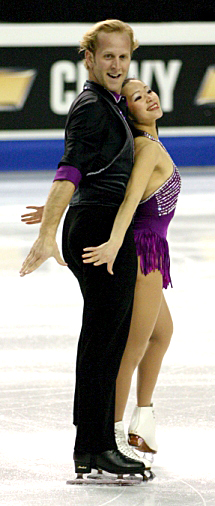
- Rena Inoue and John Baldwin

Personal information
- Full name: John Baldwin Jr.
- Born: October 18, 1973 (age 53) Dallas, Texas, U.S.
- Height: 5 ft 9 in (1.75 m)

Figure skating career
- Country: United States
- Discipline: Men's singles, Pairs
- Partner: Rena Inoue
- Skating club: All Year FSC
- Began skating: 1975
- Retired: 2010
Medal record
Figure skating – Pairs
Representing United States
Four Continents Championships
Gold medal – first place	2006 Colorado Springs	Pairs
Bronze medal – third place	2007 Colorado Springs	Pairs

John Baldwin Jr. (born October 18, 1973) is an American retired figure skater. With partner Rena Inoue, he is a two-time U.S. national champion. Inoue and Baldwin are the first skaters to perform a throw triple Axel in competition.

== Personal life ==
Baldwin was born in Dallas, Texas. His parents were both skating coaches. His father, John Baldwin Sr., competed as a single skater in the 1960s. His brother Don Baldwin competed in singles as well.

Baldwin attended Poway High School. He proposed to his skating partner Rena Inoue in January 2008. Their first daughter was born in November 2011 and the second four years later.

Baldwin and his father have a used car business, Baldwin Auto Sales, in Escondido, California. In March 2018, they were charged with non-compliance with financial reporting obligations. Their cases were resolved in 2019 after they agreed to pay back taxes, penalties and interest.

== Career ==
John Baldwin originally competed in both singles and pairs. With partner Tristan Colell, he competed at the World Junior Championships.

Baldwin was a veteran single skater, having competed at every national championship from his win at the novice level in 1987 through 2000. His best finish at Nationals as a senior was 9th in 1995. He won the 1995 national gold medal in compulsory figures.

His father, who was a skating coach, arranged a tryout between Baldwin and Rena Inoue, a Japanese skater living in America. Inoue and Baldwin tried out and agreed to form the partnership. They began competing together in 2000.

They placed 11th at the 2001 U.S. Championships. The following season, they won the pewter medal at the 2002 U.S. Championships. They were sent to the 2002 Four Continents, their first international competition together, and placed 7th.

In the 2002–2003 season, Inoue / Baldwin competed on the Grand Prix circuit for the first time. Returning to Nationals, they won the bronze medal. They withdrew from the 2003 Four Continents, but placed 10th at the 2003 World Championships.

In the 2003–2004 season, they improved on their Grand Prix results and won their first national title. They placed 4th at the 2004 Four Continents and repeated their 10th-place finish at the 2004 World Championships.

In the 2004–2005 season, they medalled for the first time on the Grand Prix and qualified for the Grand Prix Final, where they placed 6th. They won the silver medal at the 2005 U.S. Figure Skating Championships and placed 11th at the 2005 World Championships.

In the 2005–2006 season, Inoue / Baldwin medalled on the Grand Prix. At the 2006 U.S. Championships, Inoue and Baldwin became the first pair to successfully perform a throw triple Axel in competition. They went on to the 2006 Four Continents, which they won. At the 2006 Winter Olympics, they made Olympic and international history when they landed the throw triple Axel for the first time in international competition. They placed 7th overall. At the 2006 World Figure Skating Championships, they placed 4th.

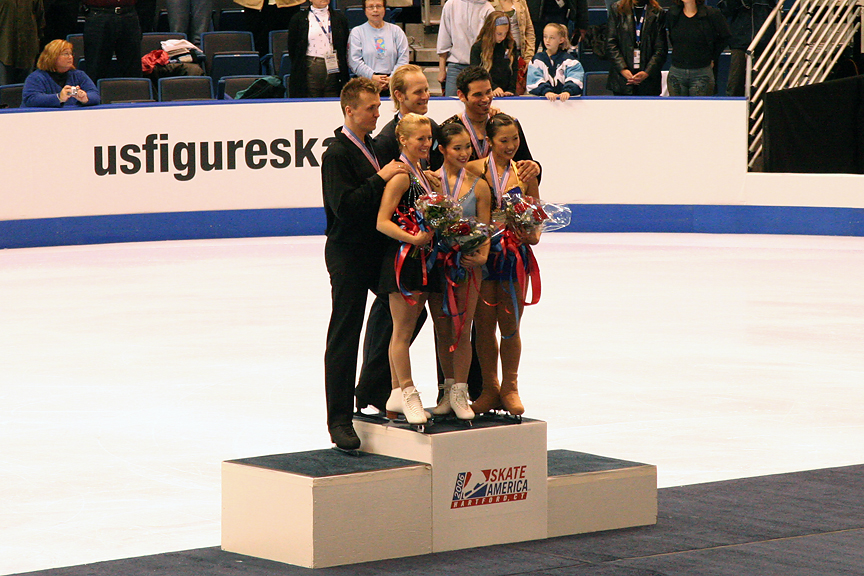
Inoue / Baldwin on the podium at the 2006 Skate America.

In the 2006–2007 season, Inoue / Baldwin won the gold medal at the 2006 Skate America after winning the short program and placing second in the free skate. They won the silver medal at 2006 Skate Canada International the next week; and then won the silver at 2006 Trophée Eric Bompard one week later. They qualified for the Grand Prix Final. While in Saint Petersburg for that competition, Baldwin was abducted, assaulted and robbed, though he and Inoue were still able to compete, and finished fourth. At the 2007 U.S. Championships, they won the silver medal. They placed 8th at the 2007 World Championships.

In the 2007–2008 season, Inoue / Baldwin sat out the Grand Prix series, choosing to skate in shows instead. Returning to competition at the 2008 U.S. Championships, they won the silver medal. While they were taking their bows following their free skate, Baldwin proposed marriage to Inoue on the ice and she accepted. Inoue and Baldwin competed at the 2008 World Championships, where they placed 10th.

Inoue / Baldwin were 5th at the 2008 Skate America and won the silver medal at the 2008 NHK Trophy.

== Programs ==
(with Inoue)

Season	Short program	Free skating
2009–2010	Tango de los Exilados by Walter Taieb and Vanessa Mae	Concert for Piano No. 1 by Peter I. Tchaikovski
2008–2009	Illumination by Secret Garden	Pompei by E. S. Posthumous
2007–2008	Beethoven's Last Night by Trans-Siberian Orchestra	Pompei by E. S. Posthumous
2006–2007	The Soul of Spain	Selection by Giacomo Puccini
2005–2006	Adagio in G minor by Remo Giazotto, Tomaso Albinoni	Selection by Dmitri Shostakovich
2004–2005	Bird of Fire Orchestra: Salsoul	Selection by Trans-Siberian Orchestra
2003–2004	Murder at the Cotton Club by Erik Ekstrand Ensemble	Wonders of the New World by Elton John; Pearl Harbor by Hans Zimmer
2002–2003	Carmen by Doc Severenson London Philharmonic Orchestra	Brazil by Michael Kamen The National Philharmonic Orchestra of London
2001–2002	Millenium	Brazil by Michael Kamen The National Philharmonic Orchestra of London

== Competitive highlights ==
GP: Grand Prix

=== Pairs career with Inoue ===
International
Event	00–01	01–02	02–03	03–04	04–05	05–06	06–07	07–08	08–09	09–10
Olympics						7th				
Worlds			10th	10th	11th	4th	8th	10th		
Four Continents		7th		4th		1st	3rd	4th	7th	
GP Final					6th		4th			
GP Bofrost Cup			5th							
GP Bompard						4th	2nd			4th
GP Cup of China				5th						
GP Cup of Russia			5th							
GP NHK Trophy				4th	4th				2nd	3rd
GP Skate America					3rd	2nd	1st		5th	
GP Skate Canada							2nd			
National
U.S. Champ.	11th	4th	3rd	1st	2nd	1st	2nd	2nd	3rd	3rd

=== Pairs career with Colell ===
International
Event	1990–91	1991–92
World Junior Championships		9th
National
U.S. Championships	8th J	
J = Junior level

=== Singles career ===
International
Event	88–89	89–90	90–91	91–92	92–93	93–94	94–95	95–96	96–97	97–98	98–99	99–00
Junior Worlds		3rd										
National
U.S. Champ.	3rd J	3rd J	2nd J	3rd J	6th J	13th	9th	11th	13th	12th	13th	15th
U.S. Champ. (figures)							1st					
