= Robert Shmalo =

American ice dancer

Personal information
- Full name: Robert Shmalo
- Born: November 2, 1977 (age 48) Cincinnati, Ohio
- Height: 5 ft 9 in (1.75 m)

Figure skating career
- Country: United States
- Skating club: Queen City FSC
- Retired: 2003

Robert Shmalo (born November 2, 1977, in Cincinnati) is an American former ice dancer who competed from 1997 to 2003 with Kimberly Navarro. With Navarro, Shmalo was an alternate for the 2002 Salt Lake City Olympics. Navarro / Shmalo were coached by Inese Bucevica and their choreographers included Natalia Bestemianova. Prior to Shmalo's ice dancing career, he was a medalist at the U.S. Championships in the compulsory figures event.

After retiring from skating, Shmalo turned to law and currently works as an attorney with the international law firm of Proskauer Rose LLP in New York City.

== Competitive highlights ==
GP: Grand Prix

=== With Navarro ===
International
Event	99–00	00–01	01–02	02–03	03–04
GP NHK Trophy				8th	
Finlandia Trophy					5th
Nebelhorn Trophy			9th		
Golden Spin of Zagreb		13th			
National
U.S. Championships	10th	6th	6th	7th	

=== Compulsory figures ===
Event	1995	1996	1997	1998
U.S. Championships	10th	4th	3rd	2nd
