= Yebin Mok =

American figure skater (born 1984)

Personal information
- Born: April 19, 1984 (age 42) Seoul, South Korea
- Height: 5 ft 3 in (1.60 m)

Figure skating career
- Country: United States
- Skating club: All Year FSC
- Began skating: 1994
- Retired: 2008

Yebin Mok (born April 19, 1984) is a South Korean–born American former competitive figure skater. She is the 2002 Golden Spin of Zagreb silver medalist, won two bronze medals on the ISU Junior Grand Prix circuit, and placed fifth at the 2003 World Junior Championships.

== Personal life ==
Mok was born on April 19, 1984, in Seoul, South Korea. She emigrated to the United States with her parents when she was seven.

== Career ==
Mok began skating in 1994 in Culver City, California. She won Junior Olympics in 1997 in Juvenile, and 1998 in Intermediate Ladies, which is equivalent to U.S Junior Nationals. A stress fracture in the summer of 1998 kept her off the ice for three months.

In October 2000, Mok made her Junior Grand Prix (JGP) debut, placing fourth in Germany before winning bronze in the Czech Republic. In November, she won a senior international medal – silver at the Golden Spin of Zagreb. Around 2000, she developed a pinched nerve in her back. She was selected to compete at the 2001 World Junior Championships in Sofia, Bulgaria. She placed tenth in her qualifying group but withdrew before the short program.

In the 2002–03 JGP series, Mok placed fourth in Montreal and won bronze in Beijing. She placed sixth on the senior level at the 2003 U.S. Championships and was sent to the 2003 World Junior Championships in Ostrava. She placed second in her qualifying group, fifth in the short program, sixth in the free skate, and fifth overall in the Czech Republic. Mok later missed five months of training due to a stress fracture in her lower back and then four months due to ganglion cysts on her ankles, which required surgery.

Mok did not compete in the 2005–06 season. She struggled with eating disorders, obsessive–compulsive disorder, and depression. In 2008, she became a professional skater for Holiday on Ice.

== Programs ==
Season	Short program	Free skating
2003–2004	Boléro by Maurice Ravel Hollywood Bowl Orchestra	Moonlight Sonata by Ludwig van Beethoven
2002–2003	The Swan (from The Carnival of the Animals) by Camille Saint-Saëns	Spartacus
2000–2001	Don Juan DeMarco by Michael Kamen	Concerto No. 1 by Camille Saint-Saëns

== Competitive highlights ==
International
Event	96–97	97–98	98–99	99–00	00–01	01–02	02–03	03–04	04–05	06–07	07–08
Golden Spin							2nd				
International: Junior
Junior Worlds					WD		5th				
JGP Canada							4th				
JGP China							3rd				
JGP Czech Rep.					3rd						
JGP Germany					4th						
National
U.S. Champ.			5th J.		10th	10th	6th	WD	16th		
Junior Olympics	1st Jv.	1st I.									
Pacific Coast			4th J.			2nd			3rd		6th
Southwest Pacific			2nd J.			2nd				8th	4th
Levels: Jv. = Juvenile, I. = Intermediate, J. = Junior; JGP: ISU Junior Grand Prix; QR: Qualifying round; WD: Withdrew
