= Jonathon Hunt =

American pair skater

Jonathon Hunt (born July 1, 1981, in Rochester, Michigan, United States) is a retired American pair skater. With partner Laura Handy, he is the 2000 Karl Shafer Memorial champion and the 2001 Nebelhorn Trophy bronze medalist. With partner Jennifer Don, he is the 2003 World Junior bronze medalist, the 2003 Junior Grand Prix bronze medalist, and the 2004 U.S. national pewter medalist. Don & Hunt announced the end of their partnership on March 8, 2005.

Hunt previously competed with Jessica Hunt and Abbi Gleeson. He also competed as a singles skater on the novice level.

== Results ==
=== Men's singles ===
Event	1998
U.S. Championships	10th J.

=== Pairs with Handy ===
International
Event	2000–2001	2001–2002
Karl Schäfer Memorial	1st	
Nebelhorn Trophy		3rd
National
U.S. Championships	6th	6th

=== Pairs with Gleeson ===
Event	2000
U.S. Championships	5th J.

=== Pairs with Don ===
Event	2003	2004	2005
World Junior Championships	3rd		
U.S. Championships	6th	4th	6th
