= University of Delaware Figure Skating Club =

Figure skating club

- Formation: 1986
- Headquarters: Fred Rust Ice Arena
- Location: Newark, Delaware, USA
- President: Jerry Santoferrara
- Website: www.udel.edu/udfsc

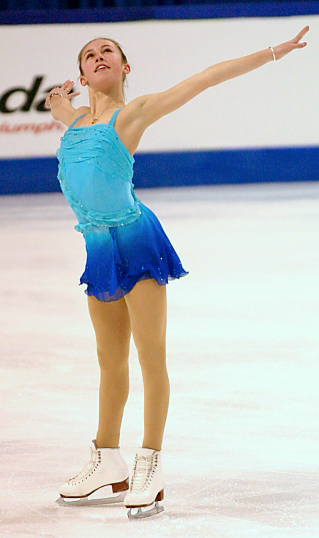
Kimmie Meissner, 2006 World Champion

The University of Delaware Figure Skating Club (UDFSC) was chartered in January 1986. The University of Delaware is home to the Blue (Fred Rust Arena) and Gold arenas which serve as the home of the University of Delaware Figure Skating Club and the Delaware Ice Skating Science Development Center (ISSDC). The University of Delaware Ice Skating Science Development Center (ISSDC) is a year-round training facility designed to meet the needs of figure skaters, first-time competitors and Olympians. The ISSDC was directed by Ronald Ludington, who coached skaters in 9 consecutive Olympics and 36 World Championships. His personal credentials included several skating titles: U.S. Pair Champion (1956–60), U.S. Silver Dance Champion (1958), World Bronze Medalist (1959), Olympic Bronze Medalist (1960), and World Invitational Dance Champion (1965).

== Coaching staff ==
The University of Delaware FSC is home to many top level National and International coaches. This is one of the main draws to the skating club. Among others, top coaches include:

- Ron Ludington
- Pamela Gregory
- Priscilla Hill
- Tiffany Scott
- Philip Dulebohn
- Scott Gregory

== Athletes ==
The following are athletes who have represented the club in competition or have trained at the club.

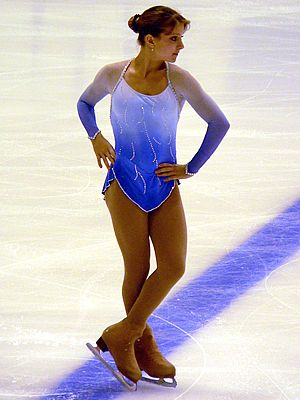
Christine Zukowski

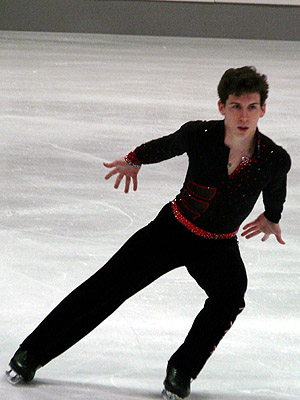
Shaun Rogers

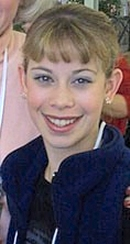
Tara Lipinski

- Brent Bommentre
- Melissa Bulanhagui
- John Coughlin
- Albena Denkova
- Scott Gregory
- Akiyuki Kido
- Anjelika Krylova
- Tara Lipinski
- Kimmie Meissner
- Jordan Miller
- Bridget Namiotka
- Kimberly Navarro
- Oleg Ovsiannikov
- Ami Parekh
- Denis Petukhov
- Craig Ratterree
- Shaun Rogers
- Scott Smith
- Maxim Staviski
- Taylor Toth
- Geoffry Varner
- Nozomi Watanabe
- Johnny Weir
- Sara Wheat
- Megan Williams-Stewart
- Christine Zukowski

In 2006, the University of Delaware sent 31 figure skaters to the U.S. Figure Skating Championships in St. Louis, Missouri, more than any other figure skating club in the United States. Additionally, in 2011 thirty-two skaters from UD qualified for senior and junior national teams after the Eastern sectional championships.

== Collegiate results ==
The University of Delaware has a record of strong performances in collegiate figure skating and is one of the top teams in the country as per national rankings. They compete out of the Eastern Conference. The University has been represented at every US National Intercollegiate Figure Skating Championships ever since its inception. Teams qualify for the national championship by competing in three conference competitions. At the conclusion of each event, skaters and university teams are awarded points in each of the three conferences: Eastern, Midwestern and Pacific Coast. The top three teams from each conference qualify for the national championship. Every year, approximately 40 teams enter into the conference competitions and nine qualify for Nationals. The team has won the national championships seven times, first in 2002 and most recently in 2024.

The University of Delaware Figure Skating Team has never placed lower than 3rd at the national championships and never lower than second in their conference. Further, individual collegiate skaters who have placed in the top 3 at the US National Collegiate Figure Skating Championships include Melissa Parker (1999 & 2002, Sr.), Megan McAndrew (1999, Jr.), Mark Butt (2000, Jr.), Jennifer Don (2003, Sr.), Laura Stefanik (2006 & 2007, Jr.), Jazmyn Manzouri (2006 & 2007, Jr.), Taylor Toth (2007, Jr.), Kathleen Criss (2014, Jr.), Taylor Aruanno (2015, Jr.) and Matthew Kennedy (2019, Jr.).

University of Delaware Collegiate Figure Skating Results
Year	Eastern Championships	U.S. National Championships, location
2000	1st	3rd, Oxford (OH)
2001	1st	2nd, Boston (MA)
2002	1st	1st, Ann Arbor (MI)
2003	2nd	2nd, Denver (CO)
2004	2nd	2nd, Amherst (MA)
2005	2nd	2nd, Oxford (OH)
2006	2nd	3rd, San Jose (CA)
2007	2nd	2nd, Hanover (NH)
2008	2nd	3rd, Ann Arbor (MI)
2009	2nd	2nd, Colorado Springs (CO)
2010	1st	3rd, Newark (DE)
2011	1st	1st, Ann Arbor (MI)
2012	1st	2nd, Colorado (CO)
2013	1st	1st, Hanover (NH)
2014	1st	1st, Ann Arbor (MI)
2015	1st	1st, Berkeley (CA)
2016	1st	1st, Newark (DE)
2017	1st	2nd, Oxford (OH)
2018	1st	2nd, Denver (CO)
2019	1st	2nd, Newark (DE)
2020	1st	Cancelled, Minneapolis (MN)
2021	1st	Not Held
2022	1st	2nd, Adrian (MI)
2023	1st	2nd, Anaheim (CA)
2024	1st	1st, Lake Placid (NY)
