= List of figure skating competitions =

Many international and national figure skating competitions are organized yearly. The three levels of ISU international competition are senior, junior, and advanced novice. Non-elite skaters may also compete in 'Adult' competitions. 'Professional' competitions were contested mainly by former elite skaters or sometimes a mix of eligible and ineligible skaters if sanctioned by the ISU.

== List of competitions ==
Competition	Nation	Notes	Ref.
Abu Dhabi Classic Trophy	United Arab Emirates		
Aegon Challenge Cup	Netherlands	Renamed the International Challenge Cup	
Alpen Trophy	Austria	Also known as the Inge Solar Memorial	
Andorran Championships	Andorra	National championship event of Andorra	
Argentine Championships	Argentina	National championship event of Argentina	
Armenian Championships	Armenia	National championship event of Armenia	
Asian Open Trophy	Varies	Occasional event of the ISU Challenger Series	
Asian Winter Games	Varies		
Asko Cup	Austria	Also known as the Karl Schäfer Memorial	
Australian Championships	Australia	National championship event of Australia	
Austrian Championships	Austria	National championship event of Austria	
Autumn Classic International	Canada	Occasional event of the ISU Challenger Series	
Autumn Talents Cup	Ukraine		
Azerbaijani Championships	Azerbaijan	National championship event of Azerbaijan	
Baltic Cup	Poland	Occasional event of the ISU Junior Grand Prix in Poland	
Bavarian Open	Germany		
Belarusian Championships	Belarus	National championship event of Belarus	
Belgian Championships	Belgium	National championship event of Belgium	
Bellu Memorial	Romania		
Black Sea Ice Cup	Bulgaria		
Blue Swords	Germany	Became the ISU Junior Grand Prix in Germany	
Bofrost Cup on Ice	Germany	Former event of the ISU Grand Prix circuit	
Bosphorus Cup	Turkey		
Brazilian Championships	Brazil	National championship event of Brazil	
Britannia Cup	Great Britain		
British Championships	Great Britain	National championship event of Great Britain	
Bulgarian Championships	Bulgaria	National championship event of Bulgaria	
Budapest Trophy	Hungary	Occasional event of the ISU Challenger Series	
Canadian Championships	Canada	National championship event of Canada	
Canadian Synchronized Skating Championships	Canada		
Children of Asia International Games	Russia		
Chinese Championships	China	National championship event of China	
Chinese Taipei Championships	Chinese Taipei	National championship event of Taiwan	
Christmas Cup	Hungary		
Copenhagen Trophy	Denmark		
Copernicus Stars	Poland	Occasional event of the ISU Junior Grand Prix in Poland	
Coupe du Printemps	Luxembourg	Also serves as the Luxembourg Championships	
Cranberry Cup International	United States	Occasional event of the ISU Challenger Series	
Croatian Championships	Croatia	National championship event of Croatia	
Crystal Skate of Romania	Romania	Also serves as the Romanian Championships	
Cup of Austria	Austria	Also known as the Ice Challenge	
Cup of Berlin	Germany		
Cup of China	China	Regular event of the ISU Grand Prix circuit	
Cup of Russia	Russia	Renamed the Rostelecom Cup	
Cup of Tyrol	Austria		
Cyprus Championships	Cyprus	National championship event of Cyprus	
Czech Championships	Czech Republic	National championship event of the Czech Republic	
Czech Skate	Czech Republic	Renamed Prague Skate	
Czechoslovak Championships	Czechoslovakia	National championship event of Czechoslovakia	
Danse sur Glace de Grenoble	France	Renamed the Lysiane Lauret Challenge	
Danish Championships	Denmark	National championship event of Denmark	
Denis Ten Memorial Challenge	Kazakhstan	Occasional event of the ISU Challenger Series	
Denkova-Staviski Cup	Bulgaria	Occasional event of the ISU Challenger Series	
Diamond Spin	Poland		
Dragon Trophy	Slovenia		
Dutch Championships	Netherlands	National championship event of the Netherlands	
East German Championships	East Germany	National championship event of East Germany	
EduSport Trophy	Romania		
Egna Dance Trophy	Italy	Companion event to the Egna Spring Trophy	
Egna Spring Trophy	Italy		
Egyptian Championships	Egypt	National championship event of Egypt	
Ennia Challenge Cup	Netherlands	Renamed the International Challenge Cup	
Ephesus Cup	Turkey		
Estonian Championships	Estonia	National championship event of Estonia	
European Championships	Varies	ISU championship event	
European Criterium	Varies		
European Youth Olympic Festival	Varies		
FBMA Trophy	United Arab Emirates	Renamed the Abu Dhabi Classic Trophy	
Finlandia Trophy	Finland	Occasional event of the ISU Challenger Series	
Finnish Championships	Finland	National championship event of Finland	
Finnish Synchronized Skating Championships	Finland		
Four Continents Championships	Varies	ISU championship event	
Four Nationals Championships	Varies	Combined national championships of the Czech Republic, Hungary, Poland, and Slovakia	
French Championships	France	National championship event of France	
French Cup	France	Synchronized skating event	
Fujifilm Trophy	Germany	Renamed the Bofrost Cup on Ice	
GAM Nestlé Nesquik Cup	Poland	Renamed the Mentor Toruń Cup	
Gardena Spring Trophy	Italy	Renamed the Egna Spring Trophy	
Georgian Championships	Georgia	National championship event of Georgia	
German Championships	Germany	National championship event of Germany	
Golden Bear of Zagreb	Croatia		
Golden Skate	Czech Republic	Renamed Prague Skate	
Golden Spin of Zagreb	Croatia	Occasional event of the ISU Challenger Series	
Goodwill Games	Varies		
Gran Premio d'Italia	Italy	Former event of the ISU Grand Prix circuit	
Grand Prix de France	France	Regular event of the ISU Grand Prix circuit	
Grand Prix International de Paris	France	Renamed the Grand Prix de France	
Grand Prix International St. Gervais	France		
Grand Prix of Bratislava	Slovakia		
Grand Prix of Figure Skating Final	Varies	Regular event of the ISU Grand Prix circuit	
Grand Prix of Finland	Finland	Regular event of the ISU Grand Prix circuit	
Greek Championships	Greece	National championship event of Greece	
Halloween Cup	Hungary		
Heiko Fischer Cup	Germany	Held in Stuttgart	
Helena Pajović Cup	Serbia	Renamed the Skate Helena	
Hellmut Seibt Memorial	Austria		
Hong Kong Championships	Hong Kong	National championship event of Hong Kong	
Hungarian Championships	Hungary	National championship event of Hungary	
Ice Challenge	Austria	Occasional event of the ISU Challenger Series	
Ice Star	Belarus	Occasional event of the ISU Challenger Series	
Ice Wars	United States	Professional event	
IceLab International Cup	Italy		
Icelandic Championships	Iceland	National championship event of Iceland	
Indian Championships	India	National championship event of India	
Indonesian Championships	Indonesia	National championship event of Indonesia	
Inge Solar Memorial	Austria	Also known as the Alpen Trophy	
International Challenge Cup	Netherlands	Also serves as the Dutch Championships	
International Cup of Nice	France	Renamed the Trophée Métropole Nice Côte d'Azur	
International Trophy of Lyon	France		
Internationaux de France	France	Renamed the Grand Prix de France	
Irish Championships	Ireland	National championship event of Ireland	
Israeli Championships	Israel	National championship event of Israel	
Istanbul Cup	Turkey	Renamed the Bosphorus Cup	
Italian Championships	Italy	National championship event of Italy	
Japan Championships	Japan	National championship event of Japan	
Japan Open	Japan		
Jégvirág Cup	Hungary		
Jelgava Cup	Latvia		
John Nicks Pairs Challenge	United States	Occasional event of the ISU Challenger Series	
Junior Grand Prix in Andorra	Andorra		
Junior Grand Prix in Armenia	Armenia		
Junior Grand Prix in Australia	Australia		
Junior Grand Prix in Austria	Austria		
Junior Grand Prix in Belarus	Belarus		
Junior Grand Prix in Bulgaria	Bulgaria		
Junior Grand Prix in Canada	Canada		
Junior Grand Prix in China	China		
Junior Grand Prix in Chinese Taipei	Chinese Taipei		
Junior Grand Prix in Croatia	Croatia		
Junior Grand Prix in the Czech Republic	Czech Republic		
Junior Grand Prix in Estonia	Estonia		
Junior Grand Prix in France	France		
Junior Grand Prix in Germany	Germany		
Junior Grand Prix in Great Britain	Great Britain		
Junior Grand Prix in Hungary	Hungary		
Junior Grand Prix in Italy	Italy		
Junior Grand Prix in Japan	Japan		
Junior Grand Prix in Latvia	Latvia		
Junior Grand Prix in Lithuania	Lithuania		
Junior Grand Prix in Mexico	Mexico		
Junior Grand Prix in the Netherlands	Netherlands		
Junior Grand Prix in Norway	Norway		
Junior Grand Prix in Poland	Poland		
Junior Grand Prix in Romania	Romania		
Junior Grand Prix in Russia	Russia		
Junior Grand Prix in Serbia	Serbia		
Junior Grand Prix in Slovakia	Slovakia		
Junior Grand Prix in Slovenia	Slovenia		
Junior Grand Prix in South Africa	South Africa		
Junior Grand Prix in Spain	Spain		
Junior Grand Prix in Sweden	Sweden		
Junior Grand Prix in Thailand	Thailand		
Junior Grand Prix in Turkey	Turkey		
Junior Grand Prix in Ukraine	Ukraine		
Junior Grand Prix in the United States	United States		
Junior World Challenge Cup	Varies	ISU championship event in synchronized skating	
Kangus Cup	Poland	Renamed the Mentor Toruń Cup	
Karl Schäfer Memorial	Austria		
Kaunas Ice Cup	Lithuania		
Kazakh Championships	Kazakhstan	National championship event of Kazakhstan	
Kings Cup International	United States	Held in Los Angeles	
Kurbada Cup	Latvia		
Lake Placid Ice Dance International	United States		
Latvian Championships	Latvia	National championship event of Latvia	
Leo Scheu Memorial	Austria	Renamed the Ice Challenge	
Lithuanian Championships	Lithuania	National championship event of Lithuania	
Lombardia Trophy	Italy	Occasional event of the ISU Challenger Series	
Lõunakeskus Trophy	Estonia		
LuMi Dance Trophy	Ukraine		
Luxembourgish Championships	Luxembourg	National championship event of Luxembourg	
Lysiane Lauret Challenge	France		
Macedonian Championships	North Macedonia	National championship event of North Macedonia	
Malaysian Championships	Malaysia	National championship event of Malaysia	
Maria Olszewska Memorial	Poland		
Master's de Patinage	France		
Medal Winners Open	Japan		
Mentor Cup	Poland	Renamed the Mentor Toruń Cup	
Mentor Nestlé Nesquik Toruń Cup	Poland	Renamed the Mentor Toruń Cup	
Mentor Toruń Cup	Poland		
Merano Cup	Italy		
Merano Ice Trophy	Italy		
Mexican Championships	Mexico	National championship event of Mexico	
Mexico Cup	Mexico		
Mezzaluna Cup	Italy		
Minsk-Arena Ice Star	Belarus	Also known as the Ice Star	
MK John Wilson Trophy	Great Britain	Former event of the ISU Grand Prix circuit	
Mladost Trophy	Croatia		
Monaco Championships	Monaco	National championship event of Monaco	
Mont Blanc Trophy	Italy		
Mordovian Ornament	Russia	Occasional event of the ISU Challenger Series	
Morzine Avoriaz	France	Renamed the Lysiane Lauret Challenge	
Nations Cup	Germany	Renamed the Bofrost Cup on Ice	
Nebelhorn Trophy	Germany	Occasional event of the ISU Challenger Series	
Nepela Memorial	Slovakia	Occasional event of the ISU Challenger Series	
Nestlé Kangus Cup	Poland	Renamed the Mentor Toruń Cup	
Neuchâtel Trophy	Switzerland		
New Year's Cup	Slovakia		
New Zealand Championships	New Zealand	National championship event of New Zealand	
NHK Trophy	Japan	Regular event of the ISU Grand Prix circuit	
Nordic Championships	Varies		
North American Championships	Canada; United States	Former championship event	
North Korean Championships	North Korea	National championship event of North Korea	
Norwegian Championships	Norway	National championship event of Norway	
NRW Trophy	Germany		
Oceania International	Australia		
Olympic Games	Varies		
Ondrej Nepela Memorial	Slovakia	Renamed the Nepela Memorial	
Ondrej Nepela Trophy	Slovakia	Renamed the Nepela Memorial	
Open d'Andorra	Andorra		
Open Ice Mall Cup	Israel		
Pavel Roman Memorial	Czech Republic		
Peruvian Championships	Peru	National championship event of Peru	
PGE Solidarity Cup	Poland	Occasional event of the ISU Junior Grand Prix in Poland	
Philadelphia Summer Championships	United States		
Philippine Championships	Philippines	National championship event of the Philippines	
Piruetten	Norway	Became the ISU Junior Grand Prix in Norway	
Polish Championships	Poland	National championship event of Poland	
Prague Cup	Czech Republic	Synchronized skating competition	
Prague Ice Cup	Czech Republic		
Prague Skate	Czech Republic		
Puerto Rican Championships	Puerto Rico	National championship event of Puerto Rico	
Reykjavik International Games	Iceland		
Richmond Trophy	Great Britain		
Riga Cup	Latvia	Occasional event of the ISU Junior Grand Prix in Latvia	
Romanian Championships	Romania	National championship event of Romania	
Rostelecom Cup	Russia	Former event of the ISU Grand Prix circuit	
Rotary Watches International	Great Britain	Renamed the St. Ivel International	
Russian Championships	Russia	National championship event of Russia	
Salchow Trophy	Sweden	Occasional event of the ISU Junior Grand Prix in Sweden	
Santa Claus Cup	Hungary		
Sarajevo Open	Bosnia and Herzegovina		
Sarajevo Trophy	Bosnia and Herzegovina		
SBC Cup	Japan	Occasional event of the ISU Junior Grand Prix in Japan	
Serbian Championships	Serbia	National championship event of Serbia	
Shanghai Trophy	China		
Singaporean Championships	Singapore	National championship event of Singapore	
Skate America	United States	Regular event of the ISU Grand Prix circuit	
Skate Canada International	Canada	Regular event of the ISU Grand Prix circuit	
Skate Celje	Slovenia		
Skate Electric	Great Britain	Also known as the St. Ivel International	
Skate Helena	Serbia		
Skate Israel	Israel		
Skate Victoria	Bulgaria		
Slovak Championships	Slovakia	National championship event of Slovakia	
Slovenia Open	Slovenia		
Slovenian Championships	Slovenia	National championship event of Slovenia	
Sofia Trophy	Bulgaria		
Sonja Henie Trophy	Norway		
South African Championships	South Africa	National championship event of South Africa	
South Korean Championships	South Korea	National championship event of South Korea	
South East Asian Open Trophy	Varies		
Soviet Championships	Soviet Union	National championship event of the Soviet Union	
Spanish Championships	Spain	National championship event of Spain	
Sparkassen Cup on Ice	Germany	Renamed the Bofrost Cup on Ice	
Sportland Trophy	Hungary		
Spring Cup	Italy	Synchronized skating competition	
Spring Talents Cup	Ukraine		
St. Ivel International	Great Britain		
Swedish Championships	Sweden	National championship event of Sweden	
Swiss Championships	Switzerland	National championship event of Switzerland	
Swiss Open Trophy	Switzerland		
Tallink Hotels Cup	Estonia		
Tallinn Cup	Estonia	Occasional event of the ISU Junior Grand Prix in Estonia	
Tallinn Trophy	Estonia	Occasional event of the ISU Challenger Series	
Tayside Trophy	Great Britain		
Team Challenge Cup	United States		
Thai Championships	Thailand	National championship event of Thailand	
Tirnavia Ice Cup	Slovakia		
Triglav Trophy	Slovenia		
Trophée de France	France	Renamed the Grand Prix de France	
Trophée Éric Bompard	France	Renamed the Grand Prix de France	
Trophée Lalique	France	Renamed the Grand Prix de France	
Trophée Métropole Nice Côte d'Azur	France	Occasional event of the ISU Challenger Series	
Turkish Championships	Turkey	National championship event of Turkey	
Ukrainian Championships	Ukraine	National championship event of Ukraine	
Ukrainian Open	Ukraine	Held as part of the Ukrainian Championships	
U.S. Championships	United States	National championship event of the United States	
United States Collegiate Championships	United States		
U.S. International Classic	United States	Occasional event of the ISU Challenger Series	
U.S. Synchronized Skating Championships	United States		
Uzbek Championships	Uzbekistan	National championship event of Uzbekistan	
Vienna Cup	Austria	Also known as the Karl Schäfer Memorial	
Vienna Trophy	Austria	Also known as the Karl Schäfer Memorial	
Vietnamese Championships	Vietnam	National championship event of Vietnam	
Volvo Open Cup	Latvia	Occasional event of the ISU Challenger Series	
Warsaw Cup	Poland	Occasional event of the ISU Challenger Series	
Winter Star	Belarus		
Winter Universiade	Varies	Renamed the Winter World University Games	
Winter World University Games	Varies		
Winter Youth Olympics	Varies		
World Championships	Varies	ISU championship event	
World Development Trophy	Varies		
World Junior Championships	Varies	ISU championship event	
World Professional Championships	United States		
World Junior Synchronized Skating Championships	Varies	ISU championship event	
World Synchronized Skating Championships	Varies	ISU championship event	
World Team Trophy	Japan		
Zagreb Snowflakes Trophy	Croatia	Synchronized skating competition	
