= Rusty Fein =

American figure skater

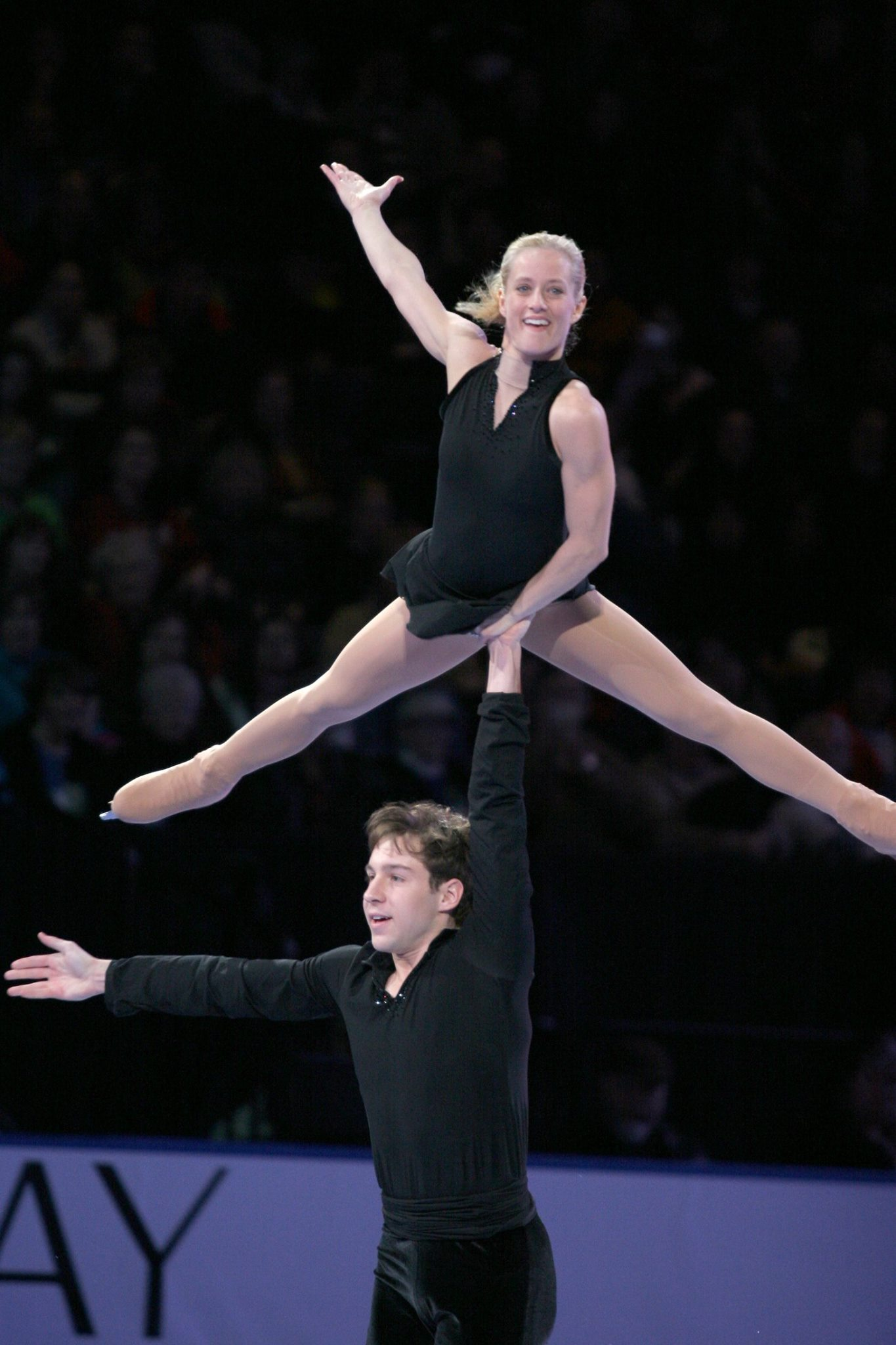
- Tiffany Scott and Rusty Fein in 2006

Personal information
- Full name: Henry Fein
- Other names: Henry Lippincott
- Born: June 24, 1982 (age 44) Washington, DC, U.S.
- Height: 5 ft 10 in (178 cm)

Figure skating career
- Country: United States
- Discipline: Men's singles, Pairs
- Partner: Tiffany Scott
- Coach: Ronald Ludington; Natalia Linichuk; Philip Dulebohn
- Skating club: Washington Figure Skating Club
- Retired: 2006

Henry "Rusty" Fein (born June 24, 1982 in Washington, D.C.) is an American former competitive figure skater, who competed in both singles and pairs. He skated in pairs with Tiffany Scott, with whom he is the 2006 U.S. national pewter medalist and alternate for the 2006 U.S. World and Olympic Teams.

== Personal life ==
Fein was born in Washington, DC. He graduated from the University of Pennsylvania in 2006 with a degree in economics, after which he joined J.P. Morgan & Co. in New York City as an investment analyst. Fein is a trustee of the U.S. Figure Skating Foundation. In 2014, he graduated from Stanford Graduate School of Business with an MBA. As an adult, he legally adopted his mother's maiden name (Lippincott) as his surname.

== Skating career ==
Fein competed internationally as a singles skater before competing in pairs. He placed 13th at the 2001 Finlandia Trophy and won gold at the 1999 North American Challenge Skate. He won two silver medals at the US National Collegiate Figure Skating Championships on the senior level and won the US National Collegiate Figure Skating Championships in Junior in 2000.

As a pair skater, Fein teamed up with Tiffany Scott in 2005. They placed 5th at the 2005 Nebelhorn Trophy and won the pewter medal at the 2006 U.S. Figure Skating Championships. They were subsequently named alternates for the 2006 Winter Olympics in Turin, Italy. They competed together until 2006.

In 2008, sports media reported that Fein would return to competitive skating, pairing with 2005 U.S. National Champion Katie Orscher, but the partnership never materialized.

== Results ==
=== Pairs ===
(with Scott)

International
Event	2005–06
Nebelhorn Trophy	5th
National
U.S. Championships	4th

=== Men's singles ===
International
Event	1999–00	2000–01	2001–02
Finlandia Trophy			13th
National
U.S. Championships		5th J.	
U.S. Collegiate Championships	1st J.	2nd	2nd

== Programs ==
(with Scott)

Season	Short program	Free skating
2005–2006	Cries of Beirut by Dana Dragomir	Force of Destiny by Verdi
