= Shaun Rogers (figure skater) =

American figure skater (born 1985)

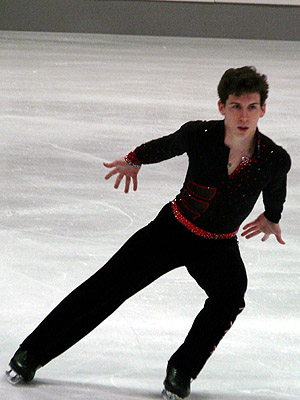
- Rogers in 2007

Personal information
- Born: July 22, 1985 (age 41) Baltimore, Maryland, U.S.
- Height: 5 ft 8 in (1.72 m)

Figure skating career
- Country: United States
- Skating club: SC of Wilmington; University of Delaware FSC
- Began skating: 1994
- Retired: 2010

Shaun Rogers (born July 22, 1985) is an American former competitive figure skater. He won silver medals at the 2007 Nebelhorn Trophy and 2008 Finlandia Trophy, two medals on the ISU Junior Grand Prix series, and placed eighth at the 2005 World Junior Championships.

In 2005, Rogers was coached by Pam Gregory and Ronald Ludington at the University of Delaware Figure Skating Club. Later in his career, he was coached by Priscilla Hill and Anne Militano at the Skating Club of Wilmington. After retiring from competition, he joined Royal Caribbean International, performing in its ice shows.

== Programs ==
Season	Short program	Free skating
2008–2009	Sweeney Todd by Stephen Sondheim	Grindhouse
2007–2008	Battle on the Ice (from Alexander Nevsky) by Sergei Prokofiev	Grindhouse
2006–2007	Battle on the Ice (from Alexander Nevsky) by Sergei Prokofiev	Butterflies and Hurricanes by Muse
2005–2006	Cinderella Man by Thomas Newman	Symphonic Dances by Sergei Rachmaninoff
2004–2005	Symphony No. 5 by Dmitri Shostakovich	The Matrix Reloaded by Don Davis
2003–2004		The Matrix Reloaded by Don Davis
2001–2002	Drumbone Blue Man Group	The Bolt by Dmitri Shostakovich

== Competitive highlights ==
Results
International
Event	1998–99	1999–00	2000–01	2001–02	2002–03	2003–04	2004–05	2005–06	2006–07	2007–08	2008–09	2009–10
Finlandia Trophy											2nd	
Ice Challenge												7th
Nebelhorn Trophy								6th		2nd		
International: Junior
Junior Worlds				16th			8th					
JGP Bulgaria				3rd								
JGP Germany			13th									
JGP Mexico			5th									
JGP Romania							5th					
JGP Serbia					9th		2nd					
Gardena Trophy			7th J.									
Triglav Trophy		5th J.										
National
U.S. Champ.	7th N.	1st N.	4th J.	2nd J.	16th		6th	15th	8th	8th	12th	19th
Eastern Sect.	1st N.	1st J.	1st J.	2nd	5th	2nd	2nd	4th	4th	1st	1st	
South Atlantic Reg.	1st N.		1st J.	1st	2nd			2nd	2nd			
JGP = Junior Grand Prix; Levels: N. = Novice; J. = Junior
