= Kimmie Meissner =

American figure skater (born 1989)

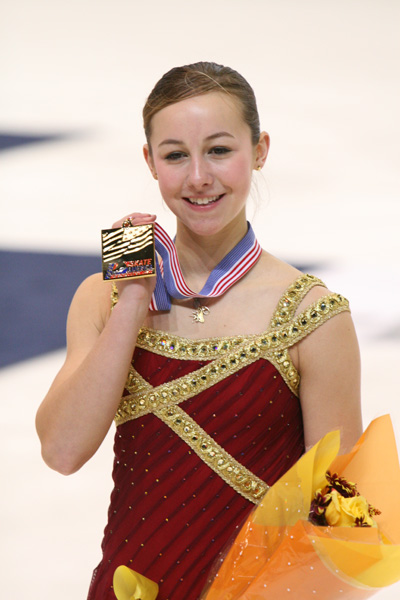
- Meissner at the 2007 Skate America

Personal information
- Full name: Kimberly Claire Meissner
- Born: October 4, 1989 (age 37) Towson, Maryland
- Home town: Fallston, Maryland
- Height: 5 ft 4 in (163 cm)

Figure skating career
- Country: United States
- Began skating: 1996
- Retired: 2010

Medal record
World Championships
| Gold medal – first place | 2006 Calgary | Singles |
Four Continents Championships
| Gold medal – first place | 2007 Colorado Springs | Singles |
U.S. Championships
| Gold medal – first place | 2007 Spokane | Singles |
| Silver medal – second place | 2006 St. Louis | Singles |
| Bronze medal – third place | 2005 Portland | Singles |
World Junior Championships
| Silver medal – second place | 2004 The Hague | Singles |
Junior Grand Prix Final
| Bronze medal – third place | 2004–05 Helsinki | Singles |

Kimberly Claire Meissner (born October 4, 1989) is an American former competitive figure skater. She is the 2006 World champion, the 2007 Four Continents champion, and the 2007 U.S. national champion. She is the first American and the first woman to simultaneously hold the World, Four Continents, and national titles. In 2005, Meissner became the second American woman to land the triple Axel jump in national competition. She was the youngest American athlete to compete at the 2006 Olympics, coming in sixth place. She won the World Championships the following month, and the U.S. Nationals the following season. She was inducted into the U.S. Figure Skating Hall of Fame in 2020.

Meissner was one of the best technical figure skaters of her time, but was an inconsistent skater, especially towards the end of her career. She was compared to Olympic skater and U.S. champion Michelle Kwan, who called her "the new face of figure skating". By 2020, she worked in the medical field and coached young skaters in Maryland. Meissner was the spokesperson for the "Cool Kids Campaign", a pediatric oncology charity.

== Early life ==
Kimberly "Kimmie" Meissner was born on October 4, 1989, in Towson, Maryland, the youngest child of podiatrist Paul Meissner and Judy (Roth) Meissner. Her father Paul played hockey in youth leagues when he was in high school in Buffalo, New York, and in adult leagues in Maryland, after attending the University of Buffalo, graduate school in Cleveland, and a surgical residency in Detroit and Baltimore. Meissner's maternal great-grandparents, Emmanuel and Paulina Novo, emigrated to the U.S. from Galicia, Spain, in the 1920s; they met in Buffalo and had nine children and 60 great-grandchildren, including Meissner. Meissner's family is Catholic; she was baptized in Williamsville, New York, near where her parents grew up in Buffalo. They attended Mass regularly, at a parish in Hickory, Maryland.

All three of Meissner's older brothers, like their father, played hockey, and she was brought to their games. She skated for the first time in January 1996, when she was six years old, after "a freak ice storm" turned their backyard in Bel Air, Maryland, into a temporary rink; she used one of her brothers' skates stuffed with paper towels. She took to skating right away, and her parents bought her a pair of skates and gave her lessons at a local rink. A few years later, she took lessons at the Delaware Skating Club in Newark, and began working with coach Pam Gregory. At first, Meissner and Gregory "had a somewhat prickly relationship", but they eventually came to respect and trust each other.

Meissner attended Fallston High School, a public secondary school in Fallston, Maryland, even though both her parents and all her brothers attended Catholic schools, because Fallston was closer to her family's home and made commuting to Delaware for her training easier, and because it provided her with more flexibility to attend classes early mornings and train in Delaware in the afternoons. It also provided Meissner with a sense of normalcy while attending high school. Her family worked hard to make Meissner's life as normal as possible; her mother acted as both her chauffeur and manager. The arrangement allowed Meissner to attend her school's prom in 2006. She graduated from Fallston in 2007. In 2014, she graduated from Towson University. In early 2020, she was taking courses in Towson's physician assistant studies program and coaching five skaters in Baltimore.

== Competitive career ==
=== Early career ===
Meissner began skating when she was six years old, after watching her older brothers play hockey. She had watched figure skating on television, eventually giving up ballet, which she began when she was four, because she "liked skating more". She landed her first triple, the Salchow, six years later.

In the 1999–2000 season, Meissner competed as a juvenile in the 2000 South Atlantic Regionals, coming in fourth place, and qualified for the 2000 U.S. Junior Championships, where she came in 16th place. The following season, 2000–2001, she also placed 16th at the U.S. Junior Championships, but at the intermediate level, and came in third place at Regionals. She came in seventh place at the 2002 South Atlantic Regionals, also as an intermediate.

She moved up to the novice division during the 2002–2003 season, coming in first place at the 2003 Eastern Sectionals and second place at the 2003 South Atlantic Regionals, qualifying for the 2003 U.S. Figure Skating Championships. She "burst on the scene" and won the gold medal at Nationals, her first U.S. Nationals event. She came in first place after the short program, putting her in a good position, and won the free skate as well, with three triples, including a triple Lutz jump. She singled a planned fourth triple, a Salchow, but ended her program with a double Axel-double toe loop-double loop combination. She ended the season with a third-place finish at the Triglav Trophy in Slovenia.

=== 2003–2004 season ===
Meissner competed as a junior during the 2003–2004 season. She earned a silver medal at the Sofia Cup, the Junior Grand Prix event in Bulgaria, and a gold medal at Slovenia, which qualified her for the Junior Grand Prix final in Sweden, where she came in fifth place. She competed as a junior at the 2004 U.S. Nationals and won the gold medal, after coming in second place in the short program and winning the free skate. Her win, along with her win the previous season as a novice, made her "one of the rare skaters" to win back-to-back Nationals in different levels.

U.S. Figure Skating placed her on the U.S. team for the 2004 Junior Worlds Championship in the Netherlands, where she won the silver medal; she was one of the youngest skaters at the competition. She finished in third place after the short program, earning marks ranging from 4.9 to 5.7. She successfully completed her triple Lutz-triple toe loop combination, a triple flip, and double Axel. Meissner later said that it was her first clean program of the season. She came in second place after the free skating program, opening with a triple flip that was not fully rotated. She completed a triple Lutz-triple toe loop combination, a triple Salchow, a triple loop, two double Axels, a triple Lutz, but popped a second triple Salchow. She also completed a layback spin with good position. She earned marks ranging from 5.1 to 5.7, her highest scores in her career thus far.

=== 2004–2005 season ===
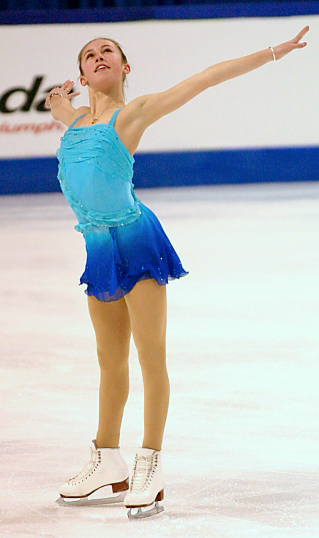
Meissner at the 2005 World Junior Championships

Meissner worked on a triple Axel jump early in the 2004–2005 season and had started to land them in August 2004, but had to take a two-month break from training the element due to a slight back injury. Her free skating program, however, included seven other triple jumps. Her personal goal for the season was to make all her moves larger and "to do skating so the people in the nosebleed sections could see what I was doing".

She began the season at the Junior Grand Prix Courchevel in France, coming in second place in both the short program and free skate, coming in second place overall. At her second Grand Prix assignment, 2004 Skate Long Beach, she again came in second place, behind Mao Asada from Japan. She finished in second place after the short program, earning 46.33 points. She had difficulty with her triple Lutz-double toe loop combination, falling out of her Lutz jump and making a turn before her double toe loop. She also had difficulty with her triple loop, which was scored as a double jump, but the program had good flow, nice spins, and a double Axel. She also came in second place after the free skate; she completed a triple flip, followed by a triple Lutz-triple toe loop combination, but popped her loop jump. She went on to complete a triple Salchow, a good triple Lutz, and a downgraded double flip-double toe loop combination. She earned 87.40 points for the free skating program, and 133.73 points overall.

Meissner's two second-place finishes earned her a spot, for the second year in a row, in the Junior Grand Prix final in Helsinki. She finished in third place, despite a "poor short program" due to a popped triple Lutz that put her in seventh place. She later said that her Lutz "was really wacky" the entire week, although she performed two of them in her free skating program, including one in a combination, and came back to finish in second place in the free skate and third place overall.

Meissner made "an impressive senior debut" at the Campbell's International Figure Skating Classic in October 2004; she replaced Carolina Kostner of Italy, competed against Michelle Kwan and Sasha Cohen, and came in fifth place. It was the first time she competed against Kwan, who was her idol. She and her coach Pam Gregory viewed the event as preparation for Meissner's first senior Nationals in Portland, Oregon. There was speculation as Meissner went into Nationals about her ability to land a triple Axel; she told the press that she would decide at the last moment if she were going to include one in her free skating program. Gregory reported that Meissner had been consistently landing triple Axels for only a week before Nationals.

She was in fourth place after the short program, which the Associated Press called "a very respectable showing for someone just breaking into the senior ranks". Meissner also told the press that she felt good about her performance and the way she had completed all her jumps, although she thought she could have done better. Figure skating reporter Elvin Walker said that she skated "with pep and technical prowess". She chose to include a triple Axel, the third jump in her free skating program, after completing a clean one during the warm-up. She was the first American woman to successfully complete a triple Axel in competition in 14 years, since Tonya Harding did so in 1991. Kwan, who tied Maribel Vinson's record held since 1937 by winning her ninth U.S. title, stated afterwards, "It's amazing for skating, and for an American skater, it's fantastic. This is the hometown of Tonya Harding, so it's the perfect place for her to try and land it".

Meissner "fought mightily" to keep her balance out of the last rotation of her triple Axel, but her landing was secure and she ended up in third place, her first senior-level medal. She successfully completed seven triples, including two Lutz jumps and a triple toe-double toe-double loop combination. Her technical scores ranged from 5.7 to 5.9 and her presentation scores ranged from 5.4 to 5.7, putting her in third place in the free skate, and third place overall. E. M. Swift from Sports Illustrated reported that Meissner earned the biggest response from the spectators and diverted attention away from Kwan. He also stated that Meissner was able to "breathe fresh air into a sport that had begun to stagnate in the U.S. and offer a peek into the future of American skating". Meissner was not age-eligible to compete as a senior at the Worlds Championships, but was named to the U.S. team for the 2005 Junior Worlds Championships. Meissner told reporters that she was not disappointed and was excited to compete at Junior Worlds, but Gregory stated that it could have given Meissner valuable experience and prepared her for the 2006 Olympics in Turin, Italy. ESPN, however, sent Meissner to Worlds in Moscow "on assignment", for a special in which she appeared with Olympians Peggy Fleming and Paul Wylie.

At Junior Worlds in Kitchener, Canada, Meissner came in fourth place overall. In her short program, she came close to the edge of the rink, but successfully completed a triple Lutz-double toe loop combination. She also completed a triple loop and double Axel, earning 52.67 points and coming in third place, behind teammate Alissa Czisny by less than .25 points. In her free skating program, Meissner began with a triple flip, followed by a triple Lutz-double toe loop combination, a double Axel-double toe loop combination, a triple loop, and a triple Salchow. She turned both her Lutz and flip into single jumps towards the end of the program, earning 93.96 points and came in fourth place in the free skate, slipping to fourth place overall and earning a total of 146.63 points.

=== 2005–2006 season ===
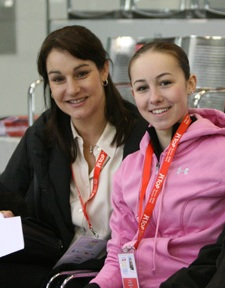
Meissner and her coach, Pam Gregory

Meissner's focus, going into the 2005–2006 season, was the Olympics, and making her routines more mature, with more difficult and intricate spins and footwork. She abandoned her triple Axel, working on it from time to time during the season, to focus on her combination jumps and because the Axel was not consistent for her. Despite her successes during the previous season, Meissner received little attention from the media for most of the season, struggling through most of her competitions and according to ESPN, was "outshone" by fellow American skater Alissa Czisny.

Meissner started off the season with a third-place win at the 2005 Campbell's Classic. She did not include her triple Axel, but earned 109.08 points overall, a personal best. At Trophée Éric Bompard in Paris, her first senior Grand Prix competition, she had a "disastrous" short program. She stepped out of her triple Lutz, which prevented her from completing a planned combination jump, and had a fall, earning 44.92 points. She came back to perform a "sparkling and difficult" free skating program that included two triple-triple combinations and two triple Lutzes. She opened with a triple flip-triple toe loop combination, followed up by a double Axel, a triple Lutz-triple toe loop, and a triple loop, which was downgraded, but she did not fall. She ended the routine with a double Axel-double toe loop-double loop jump. Both Meissner and Gregory, although they were pleased with Meissner's Lutzes, agreed that attempting a triple Axel was not worth the risk because she had not been landing them consistently. She came in fourth place after the free skate, and in fifth place overall.

At NHK Trophy, where she was more comfortable and less nervous, she again came in fifth place. She came in third place after the short program, earning 56.10 points, which were higher scores than she earned at Paris. Unlike her short program in Paris, she was able to complete her triple Lutz-triple loop combination, which was the highest-scoring jump combination (10.0 points) of the evening. Her spins were the weakest of the program; she was not centered on her spins and was afraid she would fall, but was in good position for a medal. She came in fifth place after the free skating program, earning 96.08 points and 152.18 points overall.

At the 2006 U.S. Nationals, Meissner won the silver medal and was named to the U.S. Olympic team. She was in fourth place after the short program, but after "a stellar performance" in her free skating program, overcame Emily Hughes, who came in third place. Sasha Cohen won her first U.S. Nationals title. It was the first time the IJS scoring system was used at a U.S. Nationals. Most of the media's focus during Nationals was on U.S. Figure Skating's decision about the U.S. Olympics women's team and on Cohen's potential to win the title, so despite Meissner's successes of the past season and her second-place finish at Nationals, the media paid little attention to her. Michelle Kwan, who withdrew from Nationals due to injury, petitioned to be named to the team. Eventually, U.S. Figure Skating chose to send Kwan, instead of Emily Hughes, as well as Cohen and Meissner. Kwan had to withdraw from the Olympics due to an injury that occurred during a practice session in Turin; Hughes took her place.

Meissner trained in Courmayeur, a town 150 kilometers north of Turin, the week before the Olympics. She spent most of her time in an apartment with her family instead of staying at the Olympic Village, which kept her calm and focused for the competition. She was one of the youngest competitors in the Games, and the youngest American athlete in Turin. Her short program, which had a base value of 31.7 points, was competitive compared to the strongest skaters in the field. Meissner came in fifth place after the short program with 59.40 points, 7.33 points behind Cohen, who came in first place. Meissner's presentation was clean, with some of the highest technical scores of the competition. Her component scores were weak, ranking eleventh-best, but she was in medal contention going into the free skate. Her planned free skating program opened with two triple-triple jump combinations, with a middle section that included three single triple jumps. Meissner planned a combination with three double jumps during the final segment of her program in order earn the highest points possible. She came in sixth place after the free skate, with 106.31 points, and in sixth place overall, with a total of 165.71 points. ESPN called it "a solid showing for a young woman making her first trip to the games".

Meissner came down with the flu her last few days in Italy and suffered from a ruptured right eardrum on her flight home, which caused her pain while practicing her spins and disrupted her training for the Worlds Championships for two weeks, although she told reporter Rick Maese that her Olympic experience gave her more confidence. Despite her "anticlimactic" finish at the Olympics, her hometown of Bel Air put on a parade in her honor upon her return home, and they named a street in her honor. Maese reported that Meissner's chances for winning the Worlds title, even though her teammate Sasha Cohen came into the competition as the favorite, were boosted by the absence of teammate Michelle Kwan and the skaters who won the gold and bronze medals in Turin, Shizuka Arakawa from Japan and Irina Slutskaya from Russia.

At Worlds in Calgary, Meissner came in third place after the short program, with a score of 88.63 points. Cohen was in first place, with 94.21 points and almost four points ahead of Japan's Fumie Suguri's 90.59 points and almost five points ahead of Meissner. Meissner's opening jump was a triple Lutz-double toe loop combination instead of two triples in the combination, but she earned higher scores than normal for her spins and level-3 footwork.

Meissner successfully completed seven triples in her free skating program, including two triple-triple combinations (a triple flip-triple toe and a triple Lutz-triple toe), the only ones in the competition. She hit all her elements and stayed focused throughout the program, including her double Axel-double toe loop-double loop towards the end, even though she said later that she could not hear her music over the audience, who were on their feet before she ended. She earned a personal-best score of 129.70 points in her free skate, for a total of 218.33 points, almost nine points more than Suguri, who won the silver medal, ten points more than Cohen, and over four points more than the 2006 Olympic gold medalist, Shizuka Arakawa from Japan, earned during the Olympics. In what the Associated Press called "one of the biggest upsets in World Figure Skating Championships history" and what the Baltimore Sun called "the pinnacle of Meissner's career," she earned the gold medal at Worlds in Calgary, the seventh-youngest world champion up to that point, even though her focus for most of the season had been on the Olympics and she had not yet won medals at any U.S. Championship. It was the first time since Kristi Yamaguchi that a female skater won a Worlds championship before winning a National title, and the first time an American won a World title since Michelle Kwan won a gold medal in 2003. She told reporters that her trip to Worlds in Russia the previous year as guest commentator helped her in Calgary. In March 2006, the U.S. Olympic Committee named Meissner as Athlete of the Month.

=== 2006–2007 season ===
Meissner toured with Stars of Ice during the summer of 2006, but only for ten shows because of her school commitments and because she was studying for the SATs. Her mother, who had always served as Meissner's traveling companion and manager, traveled with her. She also spent the summer "doing promo after promo": serving as Grand Marshal in two Fourth of July parades, tossing out ceremonial first pitches for both American and National league teams, and attending the ESPYs. She also procured endorsement deals with national sandwich chain Subway, sporting apparel company Under Armour, and VISA. In August 2006, Meissner was given the Michelle Kwan Trophy by the readers of U.S. Figure Skating's Skating Magazine as their favorite skater of the year . ESPN reported that she "resurrected her triple Axel from a year's hibernation", and that she was completing it consistently during practices before the season began. She also worked with choreographers Lori Nichol and Nikolai Morozov, and focused on her artistry with Olympic ice dancing champion Natalia Linichuk; they put six triple jumps into her free skating program. The music she chose for her free skating program, "Galicia Flamenco", was from Galicia, Spain, the home of her maternal great-grandfather before he immigrated to the U.S. Olympic gold medalist and figure skating analyst Dick Button stated that the program demonstrated Meissner's growth and maturity. U.S. champion Kristi Yamaguchi said that Meissner had improved artistically since the Olympics, but needed to work on the emotional aspect of her skating.

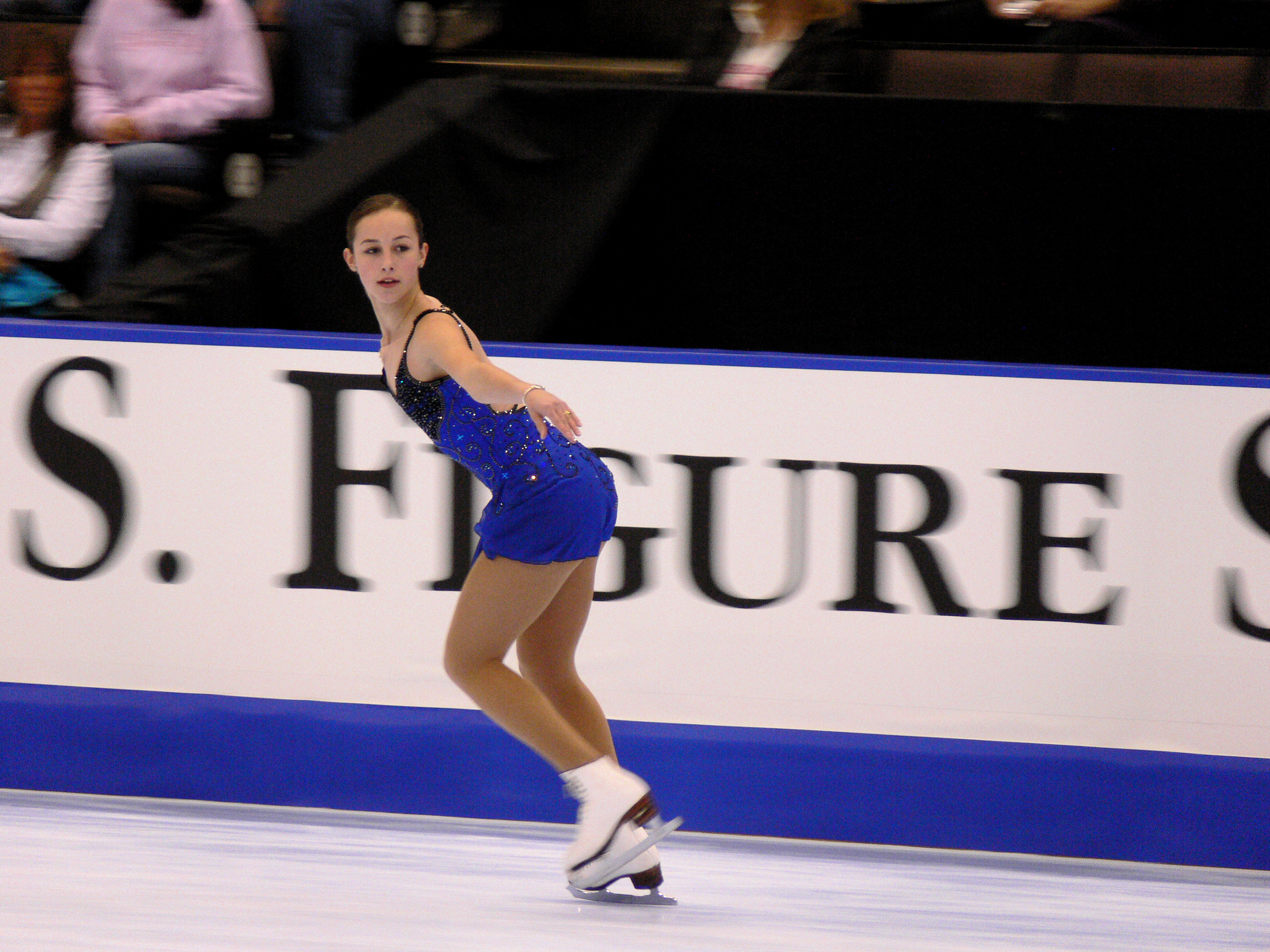
Meissner during her short program, 2006

At Skate America, the first Grand Prix competition of the season and her first major competition after winning Worlds the previous season, Meissner came in second place overall. In her short program, which Golden Skate called "disappointing", she touched down on the first jump of her triple Lutz-double toe loop combination, but was able to successfully compete her triple flip, double Axel, and a level-four spiral sequence and combination spin. She came in third place, with 58.82 points, ten points behind Asada, who came in first place, and eight points behind Miki Ando from Japan, who came in second place. She planned to include two triple-triple combinations and her triple Axel in her free skate. She came in second place in the free skate, was rough in places, but clean, with 118.96 points, 15 points behind Ando, the gold medalist, and earned 177.78 points overall. Meissner opened her program, which figure skating reporter Candus Thomson said "wasn't flawless", by successfully completing a triple Lutz-triple toe loop combination, followed by a double Axel and a triple flip-double toe loop combination. At the end of the program, however, she chose to cut short the last two jumps in a double Axel-double toe loop-double loop combination. She also had a high-level spiral sequence and spins, and completed three more triple jumps. She had a minor injury to her left middle finger, which she gashed during a catch spin, treating with a tissue while waiting in the kiss-and-cry for her scores.

Meissner's second Grand Prix assignment was Trophée Bompard in Paris. The Baltimore Sun reported that Meissner did not intend to include a triple Axel in her free skate in Paris. In her short program, she fell on her triple Lutz, so was unable to include it in a planned combination along with a double toe loop. She came in fourth place with 52.56 points. In her free skate, she successfully completed a triple Lutz-triple toe loop combination, but fell while attempting a triple Axel and popped her toe loop jump in combination with a triple flip, landing on two feet. She came in fourth place, with 105.47 points, but came in third place overall, with a total of 158.03 points. She came in eighth place towards eligibility to compete at the Grand Prix finals, making her the first reigning World champion to not qualify for the following season's Grand Prix final. Figure skating writer Philip Hersh called Meissner's season performances prior to the 2007 U.S. Nationals in Spokane, Washington "underwhelming", and raised questions about her inconsistent skating, and if her free skating program that won her the Worlds title, as well as the triple Axel she completed only once in competition, was "a one-time wonder".

As the reigning World champion and without the presence of past champions Michelle Kwan and Sasha Cohen at Nationals, Meissner was the "overwhelming favorite" against what Hersh called "the weakest women’s national championship field in at least 25 years". She came in first place after the short program, with a personal-best score of 65.69 points, "easily topping" Emily Hughes' score of 62.32 points. She skated a clean program, something she had been struggling with all season, by successfully completing her triple Lutz-triple toe combination, triple flip jump, and double Axel. She also produced two level-four spins, a good spiral sequence, and a level-three straight line footwork sequence. Meissner later admitted that skating immediately after Hughes, who also skated well, motivated and challenged her to excel in her own short program. Hughes ended up in third place after the short program, after Beatrisa Liang, who came in second place, who was more than three points behind Meissner.

In the free skate, Meissner did not plan to include her triple Axel. She came in third place, with 115.99 points. She put her hand down after completing her opening triple Lutz, which lost her some points by foregoing a planned triple-triple combination. She also had difficulty landing her triple flip-triple toe loop combination, but she successfully completed a double Axel, a double Axel-double toe loop-double loop combination, four more triple jumps, and a level-three straight line footwork sequence. She later told reporters that she was shocked after putting her hand down on the Lutz, but that she was able to refocus, regain her composure, and get through the program. She was certain that she could finish strongly and win the gold medal if she continued despite her mistake. Jeff Bunch of the Spokesman-Review felt that it was a good decision and "the pivotal moment in the deciding free skate". Bunch also stated that Meissner's choice demonstrated her self-confidence and experience. She won her first senior U.S. title, with 181.68 points overall, less than a point ahead of Hughes, who came in second place, with 180.86 points. Meissner was the first female skater since Barbara Roles in 1962 to win what Bunch called the "U.S. nationals triple crown": gold medals in the Novice, Junior, and Senior divisions. Hughes and Alissa Czisny came in second and third place. All three skaters were chosen by U.S. Figure Skating to compete at Four Continents and Worlds.

At Four Continents in Colorado Springs, in Meissner's "disappointing" short program, she fell on her opening triple Lutz-triple toe combination, but successfully completed her triple flip and double Axel. She struggled through her layback spin, so only received a level-one in her scores, and had a "wobbly" triple flip and received negative grades of execution for it. Figure skating reporter Elvin Walker reported that Meissner "seemed disconnected from her program and didn’t seem to present a clear artistic vision to the audience", but was in a good position to move up in the standings after the free skate. Out of the 26 women who skated a short program, three skated a technically clean program; Japanese skater Aki Sawada, who came in second place, was the only one of those that finished in the top three. Meissner came in sixth place after the short program, with 52.49 points; four points separated Meissner and Canadian Joannie Rochette, who came in first place.

Meissner later admitted that she came into the free skate disappointed and angry with herself for missing her opening combination jump during the short program, but that it gave her determination to do well during the free skate. As Walker put it, she "pulled out all of the stops" and won the gold medal, her first time competing at Four Continents, with 172.75 points. She struggled with her triple flip-triple toe combination, popping the flip jump, but she felt stronger as the program progressed. She opened her routine with a successful triple Lutz-triple toe combination, the only skater to include one in her program. She completed five clean triple jumps, including a second triple Lutz at the end, and a successful double Axel-double toe loop-double loop combination, also towards the end of her program. She planned to not include a triple Axel and chose to complete a clean double instead. The spectators gave her a standing ovation for her performance, which Walker felt had improved since U.S. Nationals.

Due to her inconsistent skating all season, Meissner came into the 2007 World Championships with "a lot to prove". She was in fourth place after the short program, earning a personal-best score of 64.67 points. She skated a clean program and like the other top three skaters (Yu-Na Kim of Korea, who earned a personal-best score of 71.95 points and the highest short program score up to that point, Miki Ando of Japan, and Carolina Kostner of Italy), performed triple-triple combinations in her program. Even though she fell on her triple Lutz during the six-minute warm-up, Meissner successfully performed a triple Lutz-triple toe combination jump, as well as a triple flip and a double Axel. She had good speed throughout her level-four spiral sequence, and as reporter Laura Fawcett put it, her level-three straight-line footwork sequence was "musical but seemed a little slow across the ice". She ended her program with a combination spin, which demonstrated "nice position variations".

Meissner, after a few small errors in her free skate, finished in third place, with 115.56 points and came in fourth place overall, with 180.23 points. Like her performance at U.S. Nationals, she put her hand down on the opening triple Lutz and did not complete the planned combination. The final jump in her triple flip-triple toe combination was downgraded, but she successfully completed three more triple jumps and a double Axel-double toe-double loop combination. She successfully completed her double Axel, triple Salchow, and triple loop, and produced a level-three straight line step sequence. She also completed a double Axel-double toe loop-double loop combination, but two-footed the second triple Lutz. Her level-three spiral sequence demonstrated good edges and flow, and she completed a level-four combination spin, which she performed with her arms clasped behind her back, that included a camel position with fast sit positions. According to Fawcett, Meissner's performance at Worlds demonstrated her inconsistency throughout the season. The U.S. women, due to Meissner's fourth-place finish and Hughes' ninth-place finish, earned three slots in the 2008 Worlds Championships.

=== 2007–2008 season ===
Meissner toured with Stars on Ice and Champions on Ice between seasons; she later said that it helped her improve her artistry and performing skills. At the recommendation of Gregory, she trained with coach Frank Carroll in California, as well as other coaches and a former Bolshoi ballerina for two weeks during the summer, where she focused on improving her artistry, expression, and jumps. She went into the 2007–2008 season a stronger skater and with a new focus. She began college, taking three courses at the University of Delaware, and looked to defend her U.S. title and medal again at Worlds. She changed her free skating program and choreographer four weeks before her first competition of the season because the original routine failed to inspire and challenge her. She returned to her previous choreographer, Lori Nichol, who created a routine to "Nessun Dorma," a piece usually reserved for pair skaters. Her aunt was diagnosed with cancer, she struggled with physical changes (growing four inches taller in two years), experienced a sprained ankle that bothered her all season, and transitioned to the new judging system.

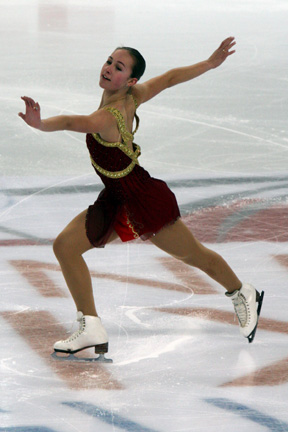
Meissner at the 2007-2008 Grand Prix of Figure Skating Final

At Skate America, Meissner won her first Grand Prix gold medal, even though she came in second place in the free skate, by less than 1.5 points than Miki Ando, who came in second place overall. Sports writer Candus Thomson of the Baltimore Sun reported that the judges interpreted the rules strictly and "cracked down on imperfections that they had previously let slide", something the ISU had previously warned skaters about. Meissner won the short program anyway, by almost three points over Ando, with 59.24 points. There were 0.03 points separating the top three skaters in their technical scores, so it was Meissner's component scores that made the difference. She successfully completed a triple Lutz-triple toe loop combination, although the toe loop was downgraded, and earned level fours on her opening spiral sequence and flying sit spin. She was disappointed, however, with the low levels of her step sequences, and later told reporters that she would increase their difficulty. In her free skate, Meissner, like all the other competitors, was unable to skate a clean program, making errors on four of her jumps. The Associated Press stated that winning Skate America came down to the skater who made the least mistakes, which was Meissner. She stepped out of a triple Salchow, popped her second triple Lutz into a single, skated slowly through her spins, and received downgrades on her opening triple flip-triple toe loop combination and her triple loop jump. She was able, however, to successfully complete two triple jumps and a double Axel-double toe loop-double loop combination. She earned 103.99 points in her free skate, and 163.23 points overall.

Meissner's second Grand Prix assignment was Trophee Bompard, her third consecutive appearance in Paris. A week before the competition, she sprained her right ankle during an ice show in Cleveland, an injury that bothered her all season. Her biggest competitor was Mao Asada; Thomson stated that the competition could be a view into future competitions like the 2008 World Championships and 2010 Olympics. Meissner came in second place after the short program, earning 55.98 points, less than a point behind Asada, who earned 56.90 points. The judges gave Meissner a deduction in her combination jump for failing to take off on the correct edge on her triple flip, but earned a slightly better technical score than Asada because she had better levels on her spins and on one of her spirals. She also earned a level-three on her layback spin. Meissner again did not include the triple Axel into her free skating program, a choice she also made at Skate America, because she and Gregory felt that it was too risky, that other jump combinations were worth more points, and that she could win competitions without it. Asada, even though she could also complete the triple Axel, also chose to not include hers in Paris. Meissner came in second place overall; Asada won the gold medal and teammate Ashley Wagner came in third place. In her free skate, Meissner received no points for the second part of her triple flip-triple toe loop combination because she took off on the jump on the wrong edge. She also underrotated a triple Salchow, singled a Lutz, and fell on her triple loop. She compensated for her errors, presenting the rest of the program well by completing her choreography with precision and earning high scores and levels for her spins. She came in third place in the free skate, earning 102.76 points and qualified for the Grand Prix final in Torino for the first time in her career.

Figure skating reporter Elvin Walker said that Meissner's Lutz combination jump and triple flip in her short program were her strengths going into the 2007–2008 Grand Prix final. He also stated that her program components were not as challenging as the other five competitors, so she needed to "skate perfect programs" to excel in Torino. During her short program, she lost points for taking off on the wrong edge on her triple flip and underrotated her second jump in her triple Lutz-triple toe loop combination, but was able to successfully complete a double Axel and two level-four spins. She came in fifth place after the short program, with 59.08 points. She later told reporters that she felt that she had delivered a strong program, despite her scores. Meissner ultimately came in sixth place, after coming in sixth place in the free skate, with 95.14 points. She fell on both her triple Lutzes and on her opening triple flip, which was penalized because she took off on the wrong edge. After what Philip Hersh of the Chicago Tribune called her "poor Grand Prix Final performances", Meissner told figure skating commentator Peter Carruthers that she needed to train harder before U.S. Nationals. Carruthers said that she seemed to be "second-guessing" herself and that she lacked "full conviction". Hersh also said that Meissner's skating was inconsistent since winning Worlds in 2006, and that she needed to figure out the reasons for her unsuccessful performances before Nationals in order to qualify for the 2008 Worlds Championships. Her choreographer Lori Nichol felt that Meissner's results in Turin would motivate her to do better.

At the 2008 U.S. Nationals in St. Paul, Meissner came in fourth place after what Elvin Walker called a "disappointing" short program. She started with "an elegant" spiral sequence, but then fell on an underrotated triple flip, which she called "a silly mistake". She successfully completed her triple Lutz-double toe combination and double Axel, but was over 12 points behind the first-place finisher, Mirai Nagasu, earning 57.58 points.

Meissner performed a revamped free skating program that was the most difficult free skating program of the competition, with two triple-triple combinations. She fell three times, on her first two elements, a triple flip and a triple Lutz, and another triple Lutz, but successfully completed a double Axel-double toe combination and two triple jumps. Walker stated that her high quality, high-level spins kept her from scoring lower in the standings. She finished in seventh place overall, with 149.22 points, her lowest scores at U.S. Nationals, and in what Candus Thomson called "the worst performance by a reigning women's champion in the past 50 years". Thomson reported that Meissner seemed to have "melted down and looked completely bewildered and near tears". It was the first time a reigning Worlds champion lost at U.S. Nationals since 1997, when Michelle Kwan lost to Tara Lipinski.

Thomson also wrote that Meissner "hasn't been her old self" and "Instead of beating others, she's beating herself". Meissner told reporters that her problem was not physical, but that it was mental, and promised to fix what was wrong. Despite her apparent problems with her self-confidence but due to her experience and because three of the American women were too young to compete internationally at the senior level, U.S. Figure Skating chose to send Meissner, along with Ashley Wagner and Bebe Liang, to Worlds. It was the first time in many years that the American women did not have a credible chance of winning a medal at Worlds.

In February 2008, Meissner left her long-time coach Pam Gregory and moved out of her family home in Delaware to work with coach Richard Callaghan in Florida. She later said that she had grown apart from Gregory as early as 2007, and had misgivings about her career. Meissner hoped that the change in coaches and the opportunity to compete at Worlds would help salvage what seemed to be a declining career, saying, "I’m grateful to Pam Gregory for everything she has done, but I needed to make some changes in order to regain my focus and confidence". Steve Keating of Reuters called Meissner's change in coaches "unexpectedly bold". Although Meissner came in ninth place after the short program at Worlds, with 57.25 points, she told reporters that she was happy with her performance. She also said that she changed her triple-triple combination into a triple-double combination to make sure that she had a clean program. She came in 12th place in the free skate, which figure skating reporter Anna Kondakova called " a hit-and-miss experience" for Meissner. She stepped out of her first jump, underrotated the last jump in her triple flip-triple toe loop combination, and fell on her Lutz and Salchow, which were also underrotated. She came in seventh place overall, with 149.74 points. Her low standings, along with her teammates' (Liang came in 10th place and Wagner came in 16th place) meant that the U.S. would send only two women to the 2009 Worlds Championships.

=== Post-2008 career ===
Going into the 2008–2009 season, Meissner worked to get her career back on track with Callaghan and former figure skater and World Champion Todd Eldredge. She also worked with a ballet instructor. She later said that her arrangement with Callaghan did not work and that his approach "robbed her of the joy that had always fueled her best performances".

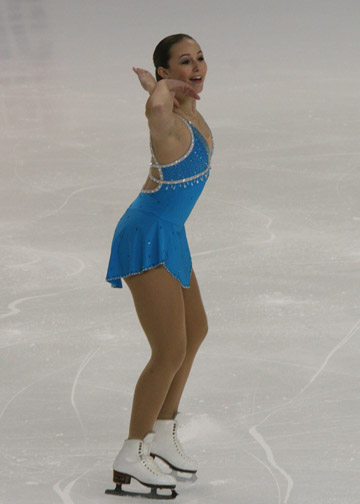
Meissner at 2008 Skate America

At 2008 Skate America, despite being well-prepared and having good practices and warm-ups, her comeback was "derailed in a series of falls and poorly executed jumps". She came in eighth place overall. In her short program, she rushed the entrance to her triple flip and fell, although Elvin Walker of Golden Skate reported that she "skated with a newfound maturity and a happiness that has been absent from her skating at recent competitions" and that her results kept her in contention for a medal, anyway. She came in sixth place, earning 54.90 points. The New York Times reported that in the free skate, she seemed to be "struggling with the same demons that wrecked her confidence last season". Walker called her free skate "disastrous"; she slipped on the landings and fell on her opening two jumps, a triple Lutz and a double Axel, changed or eliminated five other jumps, and completed none of her planned three combination jumps. She came in ninth place in the free skate, earning 81.02 points, with 135.92 points overall. Despite her low results, Olympic champion and figure skating commentator Scott Hamilton, who blamed Meissner's difficulties on her recent growth spurt, said that she should not be counted out of consideration for future success. The Associated Press called Meissner's performance during her short program at 2008 Cup of Russia "disappointing". She came in eighth place, with 48.08 points. She came in seventh place in the free skate, with 83.28 points, and eighth place overall, earning a total of 131.36 points.

Meissner withdrew from the 2009 U.S. Nationals due to a hip flexor injury that occurred during an off-ice training session, while sprinting on a treadmill, and exacerbated while training jumps on the ice. She went through physical therapy back in Baltimore, but the pain was too much to complete her jumps and fully compete. She stated that she hoped that she would recover in order to compete at the 2010 Nationals.

In August 2009, Meissner watched a beloved aunt and an 8-year old friend from the Cool Kids Campaign die of cancer. Also in August, Meissner sustained an injury while training, when she pulled out of a jump to avoid colliding with a younger skater. She landed on her right knee, which became chronically inflamed, swollen, and painful. After six weeks of physical therapy back home in Maryland, she was diagnosed with severe patellar tendonitis and a partial dislocation in her right kneecap. After consulting with an orthopedic specialist, she decided to withdraw from her two Grand Prix assignments, the Rostelecom Cup and the NHK Trophy. Although her withdrawal meant that she would not be eligible for Nationals and thereby not eligible for the Olympics, she told the Baltimore Sun she was not retiring from skating. She told the press, "For the United States to be represented properly, especially during an Olympic year, I feel I must put my personal desire to compete aside". Callaghan said that training had gone well over the summer before her injury and that Meissner was upset about the situation, but he was confident that she would be able to compete at the 2014 Olympics.

In early 2010, Meissner changed coaches again, to Baltimore-based coach Chris Conte, who had previously worked with Sasha Cohen, Emily Hughes, Miki Ando, and Timothy Goebel. Conte helped her rebuild her jumping technique and make it more efficient, add rotation to her takeoffs and stability to her landings, and choreograph her ice show programs. She also began working as a physical therapist, performing in ice shows, and taking college courses. Meissner retired from competitive skating in 2010.

In 2016, Meissner told figure skating reporter Sarah Brannen that the end of her competitive career was difficult for her, and that without training for competitions, she felt depressed, lost, directionless, and betrayed by her own body. For a while, she expected to recover from her injuries and return to competitive skating, but too many things happened in her personal life at the same time. She ended up distancing herself from figure skating and had nothing to do with the sport for two years. She said that it took her five years to recover from retiring from competitive skating. For many years, it was difficult for her to even watch competitions, but she found support from her family and from other skaters like Michelle Kwan and Ryan Bradley.

In 2012, she competed in a pro-am competition, coming in sixth place, in 2014 and 2015, Meissner toured full-time with Stars on Ice, and in 2016 she served as a researcher for NBC at the Sochi Olympics. Also by 2016, she was coaching young skaters, including junior skater Mia Eckels, who competed as a junior at the 2020 U.S. Nationals. She later said that coaching was what brought her back to the rink, and that working with younger skaters brought the joy of skating back into her life. By 2018, she was performing from time to time in ice shows. In 2020, she was inducted, along with ice dancers Meryl Davis and Charlie White and coach Kathy Casey, into the U.S. Figure Skating Hall of Fame. She called it " 'one of the top' achievements of her career" and "the ultimate in an athlete’s life".

In October 2018, Meissner became engaged to long-time boyfriend Josh Heyne; they were married in the summer of 2019.

== Skating style ==
Meissner was one of the best technical figure skaters, with good position in the air on her jumps, smooth landings, fast speed, and high energy, but her weakness was her artistry, which the Associated Press, in 2007, speculated was due to her young age. Her coach Pam Gregory compared Meissner's discipline and work ethic to skaters Tara Lipinski and Sarah Hughes, who won Olympic gold medals when they were teenagers. Also like Lipinski and Hughes, Meissner enjoyed performing in front of loud, enthusiastic crowds. Gregory also praised Meissner's courage and competitive spirit and called her "extremely tough mentally". Her performances, however, tended to be inconsistent, especially after late 2006. For example, Philip Hersh of the Los Angeles Times raised questions about her uneven skating and if the free skating program that won her the Worlds title in 2006, as well as the triple Axel she completed only once in competition at U.S. Nationals in 2005, was "a one-time wonder". In 2005, Meissner told Candus Thomson of the Baltimore Sun that she knew the day of a competition if she would be able to land her triple Axel. Reporter Rick Maese stated in 2006 that Meissner tended to do better in the free skate than in the short program, "when her myriad of jumps can compensate for artistic deficiencies".

Kersh compared Meissner to Olympian and U.S champion Michelle Kwan, who Meissner admired; he said, when Meissner was 14 in 2004, that Meissner's presentation were as immature as Kwan's were when Kwan was 14, but that Meissner's jumps were not as consistent as Kwan's. Many sports reporters considered Meissner the future of women's figure skating and anticipated that she would succeed into the long-term, at future competitions such as the 2010 Olympics in Vancouver. In 2007, Thomson reported that Kwan herself called Meissner "the new face of figure skating".

== Philanthropic work ==
After winning the Worlds championships in 2006, Meissner became the official ambassador for the "Cool Kids Campaign", which provided toys and games for pediatric oncology patients at the University of Maryland Medical Center and Johns Hopkins Hospital and paid for their families' outings during their treatment. She also designed bracelets, inspired by cyclist Lance Armstrong's Livestrong bracelets, to raise money for the charity. Her choreographer Lori Nichol stated that Meissner's work with children with cancer helped her be a better and more thoughtful figure skater. Meissner also became the spokesperson for a public school reading challenge.

In 2007, Meissner headlined her first ice show, "Kimmie's Angels on Ice", a fundraiser in Baltimore for the Cool Kids Campaign and the Belanger-Federico Foundation. Several figure skaters also performed, including American champions Evan Lysacek, Johnny Weir, and Michael Weiss, Yuka Sato from Japan, Canadians Joannie Rochette and Jeffrey Buttle, Steven Cousins from Britain, American ice dancers Tanith Belbin and Ben Agosto, and American pair team Brooke Castile and Ben Okolski. The show was choreographed by former pair skating champion Lea Ann Miller. About 120 young cancer patients and their families watched the show for free and went to a party with cast members.

== Records and achievements ==
- One of the few skaters to win all U.S. novice (2003), junior (2004), and senior (2007) titles
- Youngest American to compete at the 2006 Winter Olympics
- First American and first woman to possess the World (2006), Four Continents (2007), and U.S. National (2007) at the same time
- Second American woman to successfully complete a triple Axel in competition (2005 U.S. Championships)

== Awards ==
- Michelle Kwan Trophy, Favorite skater of the year, 2006
- Inducted into the U.S. Figure Skating Hall of Fame, 2020

== Programs ==
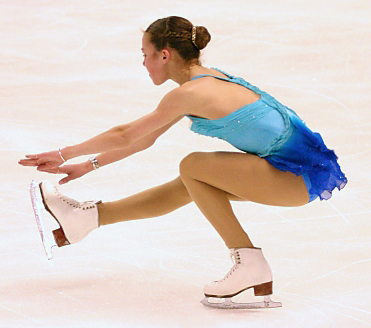
Meissner performs a sit spin at the 2005 World Junior Championships.

| Season | Short program | Free skating | Exhibition |
|---|---|---|---|
| 2009–2010 | Un Ange Passe by Alain Lefèvre | Siciliana (from Suite No. 3) by Ottorino Respighi; Romeo and Juliet by Nino Rota, performed by various orchestras; Adieu; Love Theme; Romeo and Juliet Suite | |
| 2008–2009 | Un Ange Passe by Alain Lefèvre | Concerto Grosso No. 11 in D minor by Antonio Vivaldi, performed by the BBC Philharmonic; Adagio in G minor by Remo Giazotto, Tomaso Albinoni, performed by the Eroica Trio | |
| 2007–2008 | The Feeling Begins by Peter Gabriel choreo. by Lori Nichol | Nessun dorma by Giacomo Puccini choreo. by Lori Nichol | |
| 2006–2007 | Snowstorm by Georgy Sviridov choreo. by Nikolai Morozov | Galicia Flamenca; Paternera by Gino d'Auri choreo. by Lori Nichol | Keep Holding On by Avril Lavigne |
| 2005–2006 | Symphonic Dances by Sergei Rachmaninoff | Belkis, Queen of Sheba by Ottorino Respighi | |
| 2004–2005 | Reverie by Claude Debussy | Daphnis et Chloé by Maurice Ravel | |
| 2003–2004 | Sand and Water | Pines of Rome by Ottorino Respighi | |

== Results ==
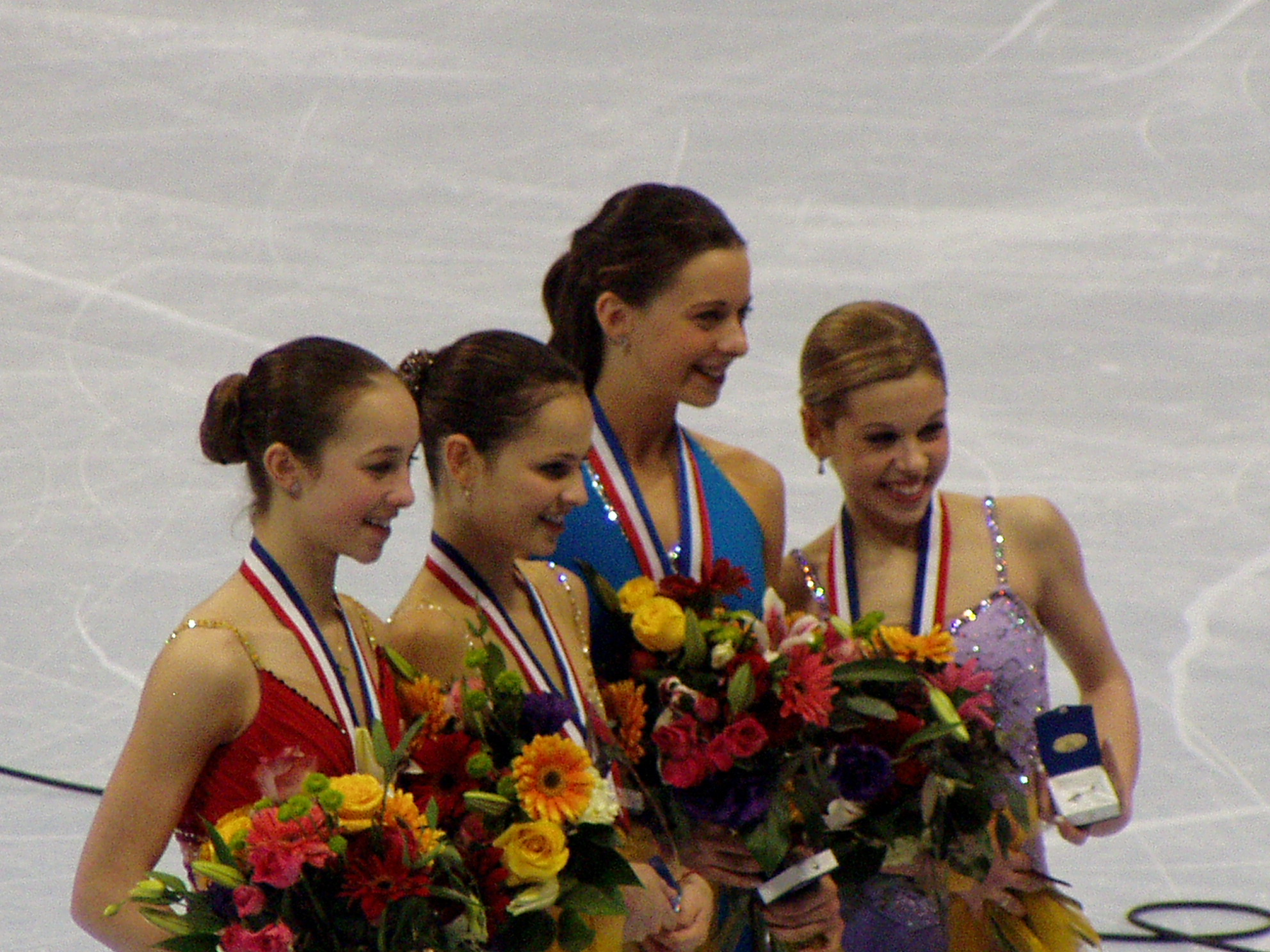
The women's podium at the 2006 U.S. Nationals. From left: Meissner (2nd), Sasha Cohen (1st), Emily Hughes (3rd), Katy Taylor (4th)

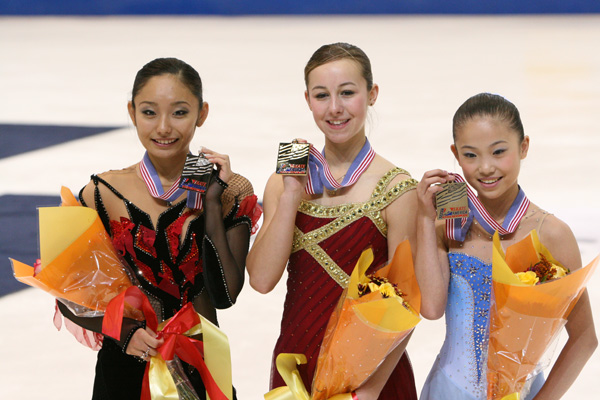
The women's podium at 2007 Skate America. From left: Miki Ando (2nd), Meissner (1st), Caroline Zhang (3rd)

GP: Grand Prix; JGP: Junior Grand Prix

International
| Event | 03–04 | 04–05 | 05–06 | 06–07 | 07–08 | 08–09 |
|---|---|---|---|---|---|---|
| Olympics | | | 6th | | | |
| Worlds | | | 1st | 4th | 7th | |
| Four Continents | | | | 1st | | |
| GP Final | | | | | 6th | |
| GP Bompard | | | 5th | 3rd | 2nd | |
| GP Cup of Russia | | | | | | 8th |
| GP NHK Trophy | | | 5th | | | |
| GP Skate America | | | | 2nd | 1st | 8th |
International: Junior
| Junior Worlds | 2nd | 4th | | | | |
| JGP Final | 5th | 3rd | | | | |
| JGP Bulgaria | 2nd | | | | | |
| JGP France | | 2nd | | | | |
| JGP Slovenia | 1st | | | | | |
| JGP USA | | 2nd | | | | |
National
| US Champ. | 1st J | 3rd | 2nd | 1st | 7th | WD |
