= Farah Sheikh =

American figure skater

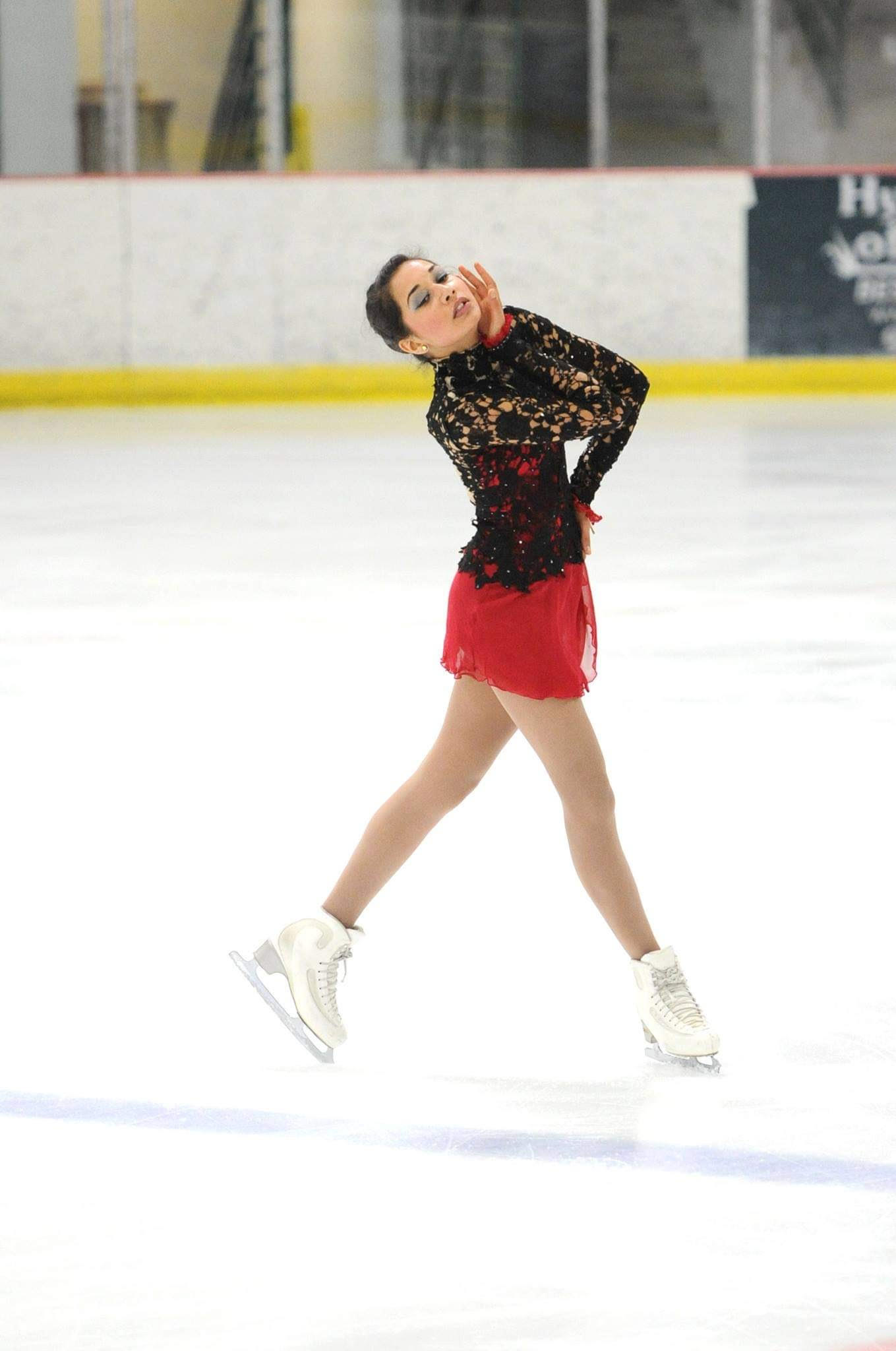
2013 U.S. Figure Skating Collegiate National Champion

Farah Jameela Sheikh Mattone (pronounced 'Shake') is the 2013 US Ladies Collegiate Figure Skating National Champion. She is from Lexington, Kentucky.

== Skating career ==
Sheikh began skating as a preteen. She trained in Bloomfield Hills, Michigan at the Detroit Skating Club under coach Julianne Berlin, a world-level figure skating coach, Yuka Sato, Anjelika Alexeyevna Krylova, Aaron Parchem, and Jason Dungjen. Sheikh was the Figure Skating Michigan State Champion twice during high school.

== Business career ==
Sheikh set up and owns a company, Bunnyblast Pre-workout.

== Academic achievements ==
In 2017, Sheikh earned a degree in Psychology with a minor in Entrepreneurship from the University of Miami. In 2020, Sheikh graduated from law school, earning her Juris Doctor from The University of Miami School of Law.
