= 2010 Trophée Éric Bompard =

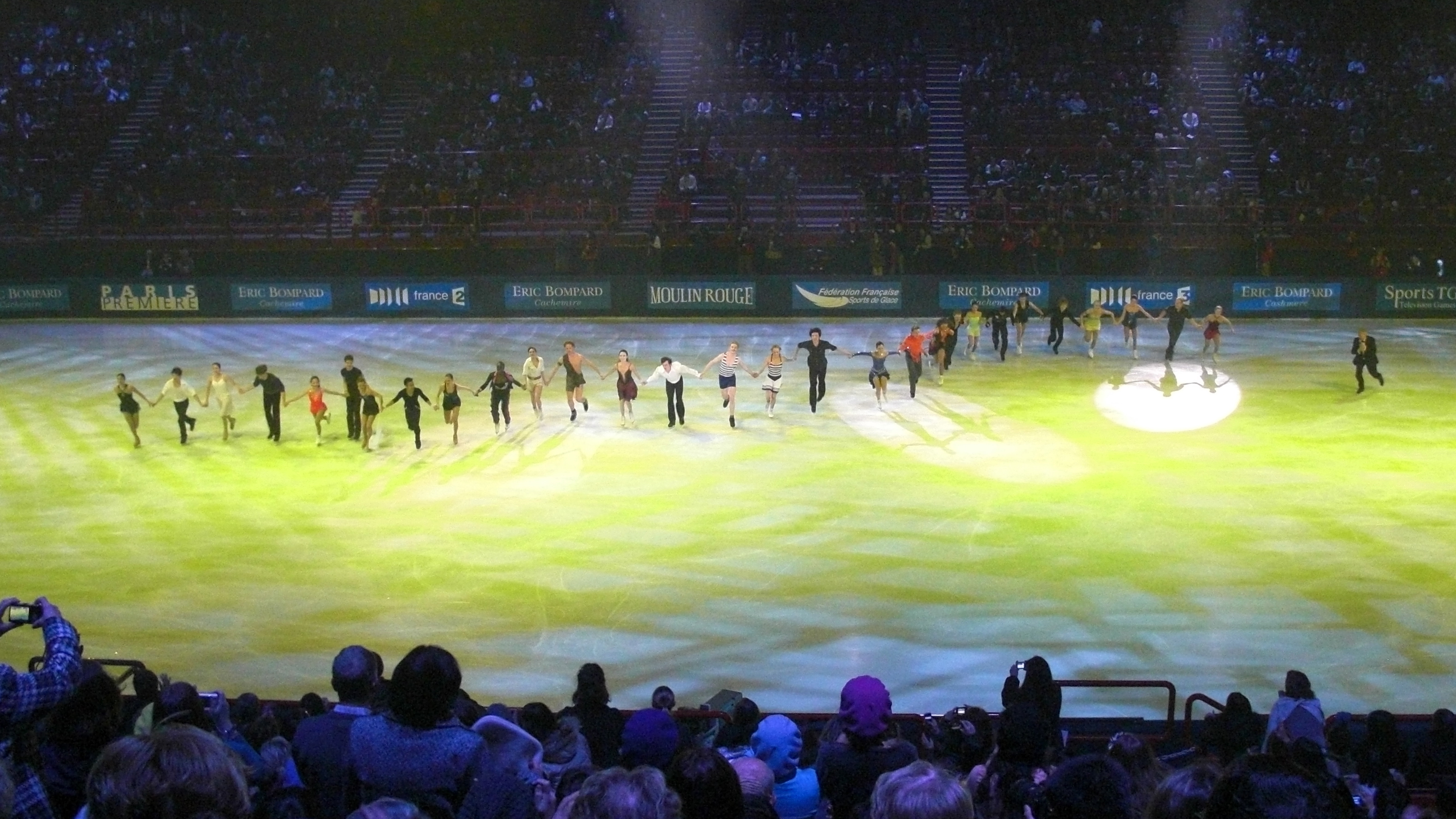
- Type: Grand Prix
- Date: 25 November – 28
- Season: 2010–11
- Location: Paris
- Host: Federation Française des Sports de Glace
- Venue: Palais Omnisports de Paris-Bercy

Champions
- Men's singles: (Japan) Takahiko Kozuka
- Ladies' singles: (Finland) Kiira Korpi
- Pairs: (Germany) Aliona Savchenko / Robin Szolkowy
- Ice dance: (France) Nathalie Pechalat / Fabian Bourzat
- Previous: 2009 Trophée Éric Bompard
- Next: 2011 Trophée Éric Bompard
- Previous GP: 2010 Cup of Russia
- Next GP: 2010–11 Grand Prix Final

The 2010 Trophée Éric Bompard was the final event of six in the 2010–11 ISU Grand Prix of Figure Skating, a senior-level international invitational competition series. It was held at the Palais Omnisports de Paris-Bercy in Paris on 25–28 November. Medals were awarded in the disciplines of men's singles, ladies' singles, pair skating, and ice dancing. Skaters earned points toward qualifying for the 2010–11 Grand Prix Final.

== Results ==
=== Men ===
Rank	Name	Nation	Total points	SP		FS	
1	Takahiko Kozuka	Japan	248.07	1	77.64	1	170.43
2	Florent Amodio	France	229.38	2	75.62	2	153.76
3	Brandon Mroz	United States	214.31	3	72.46	3	141.85
4	Kevin Reynolds	Canada	200.13	7	66.13	4	134.00
5	Chafik Besseghier	France	185.69	4	70.33	7	115.36
6	Song Nan	China	181.53	8	62.88	5	118.65
7	Peter Liebers	Germany	177.54	6	66.53	8	111.01
8	Anton Kovalevski	Ukraine	173.92	9	55.79	6	118.13
9	Zoltán Kelemen	Romania	161.70	10	53.02	9	108.68
WD	Brian Joubert	France	66.95	5	66.95		

=== Ladies ===
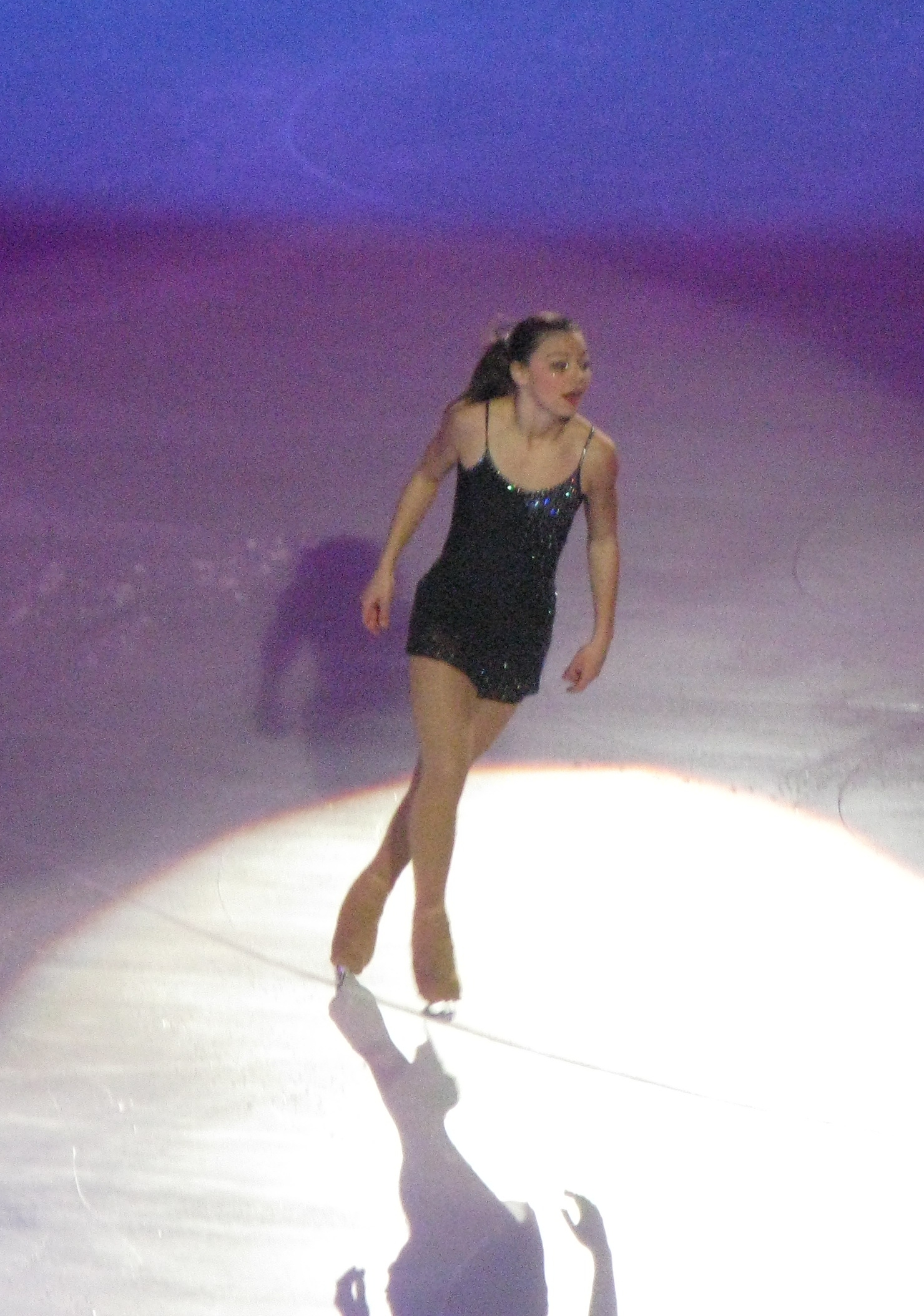
Lena Marrocco at the 2010 Trophée Éric Bompard

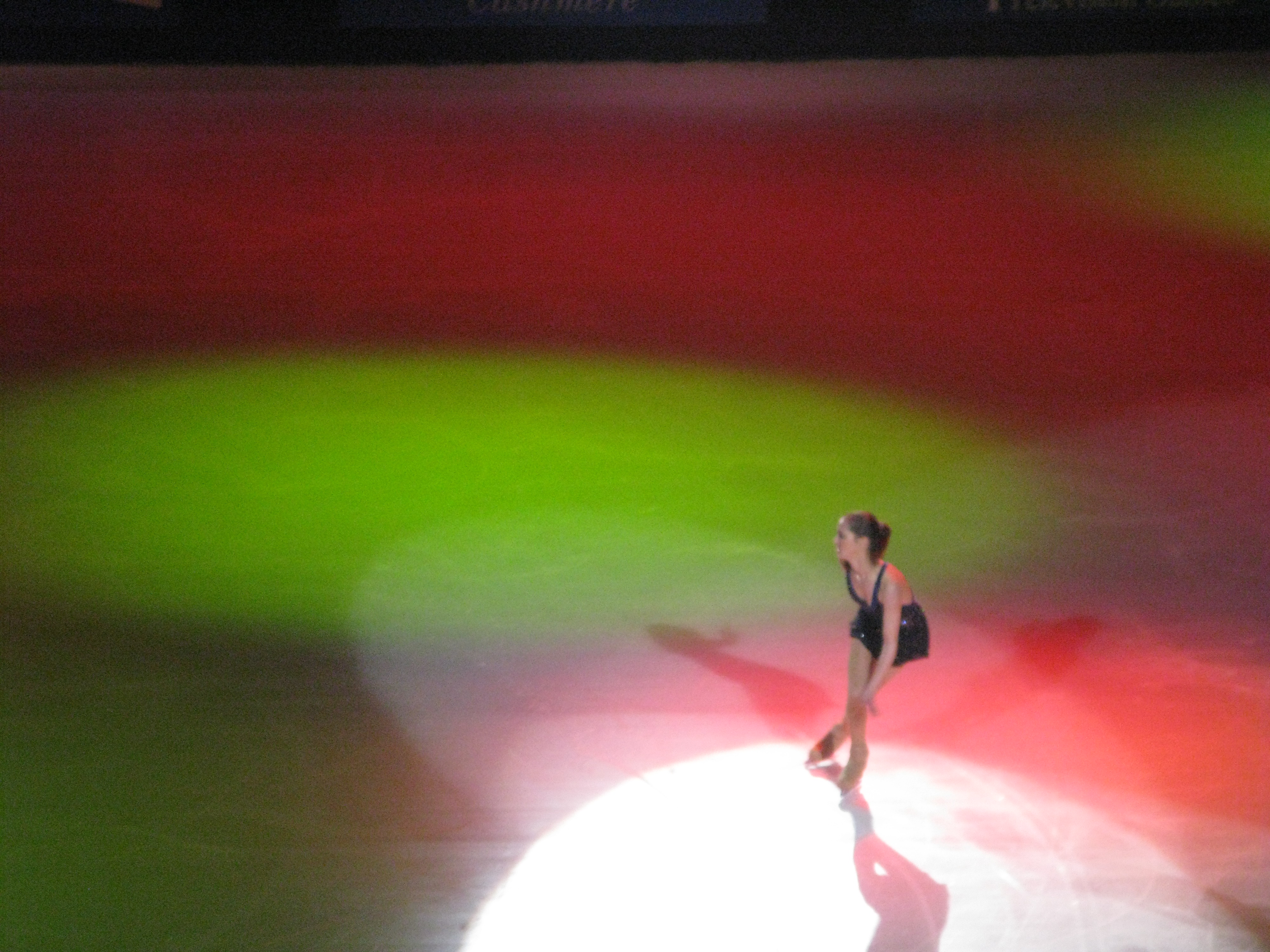
Candice Didier at the 2010 Trophée Éric Bompard

Rank	Name	Nation	Total points	SP		FS	
1	Kiira Korpi	Finland	169.74	1	61.39	2	108.35
2	Mirai Nagasu	United States	167.79	2	58.72	1	109.07
3	Alissa Czisny	United States	159.80	4	55.50	4	104.30
4	Cynthia Phaneuf	Canada	155.11	6	50.51	3	104.60
5	Mao Asada	Japan	148.02	7	50.10	5	97.92
6	Haruka Imai	Japan	145.47	3	58.38	9	87.09
7	Sonia Lafuente	Spain	143.60	8	46.81	6	96.79
8	Fumie Suguri	Japan	138.18	5	50.76	8	87.42
9	Maé Bérénice Méité	France	137.08	11	41.69	7	95.39
10	Sarah Hecken	Germany	130.17	9	46.73	10	83.44
11	Candice Didier	France	120.80	10	46.06	12	74.74
12	Léna Marrocco	France	113.31	12	38.39	11	74.92

=== Pairs ===
Rank	Name	Nation	Total points	SP		FS	
1	Aliona Savchenko / Robin Szolkowy	Germany	197.88	1	66.65	1	131.23
2	Vera Bazarova / Yuri Larionov	Russia	183.00	2	64.18	2	118.82
3	Maylin Hausch / Daniel Wende	Germany	157.42	3	54.02	3	103.40
4	Mylène Brodeur / John Mattatall	Canada	145.31	4	45.47	4	99.84
5	Felicia Zhang / Taylor Toth	United States	127.48	5	40.93	5	86.55
6	Klára Kadlecová / Petr Bidař	Czech Republic	112.08	7	39.32	6	72.76
7	Anna Khnychenkova / Mark Magyar	Hungary	110.13	6	39.46	7	70.67

=== Ice dancing ===
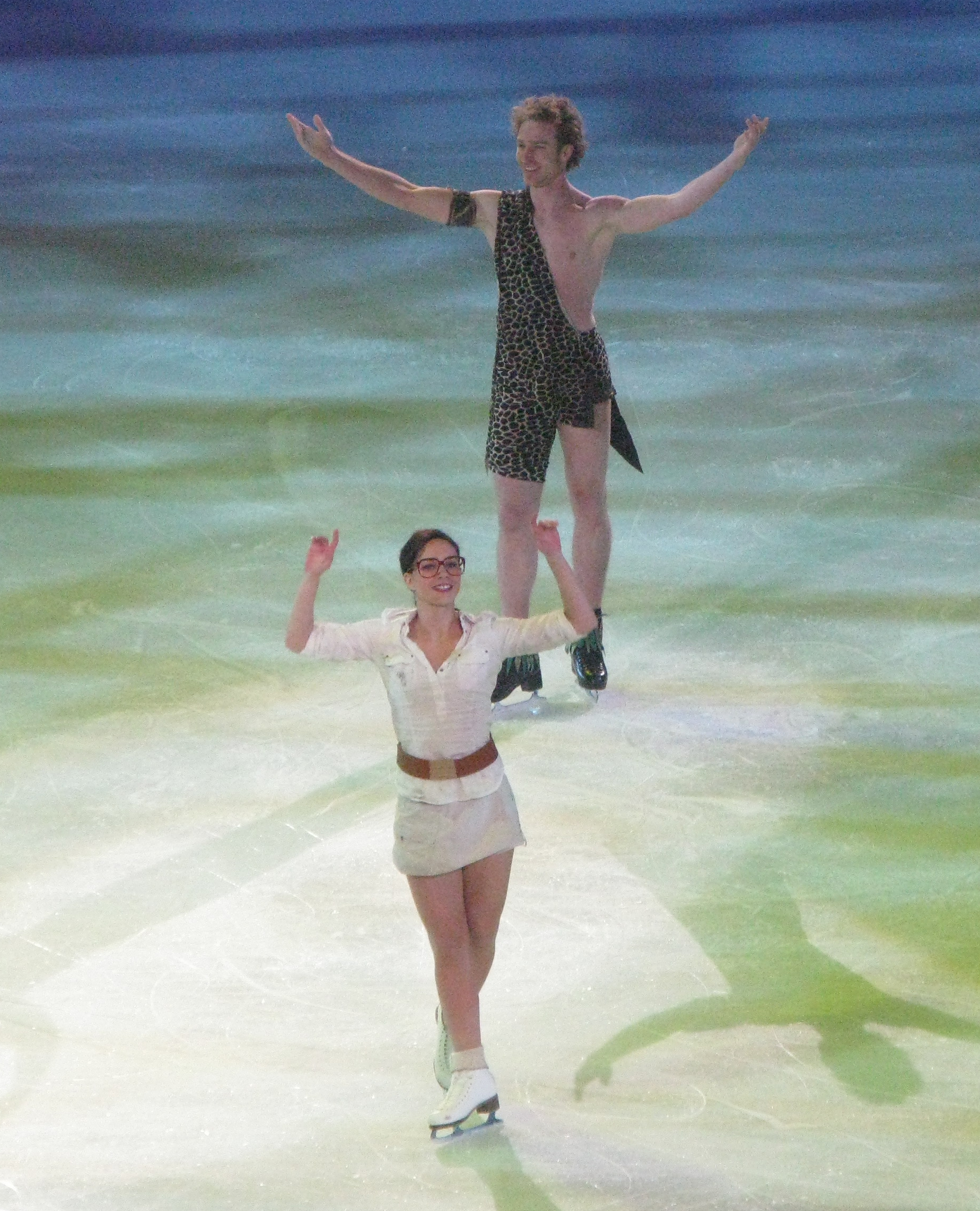
Péchalat & Bourzat at the 2010 Trophée Éric Bompard

Rank	Name	Nation	Total points	SD		FD	
1	Nathalie Péchalat / Fabian Bourzat	France	161.82	1	65.48	1	96.34
2	Ekaterina Riazanova / Ilia Tkachenko	Russia	146.79	2	60.81	2	85.98
3	Madison Chock / Greg Zuerlein	United States	138.48	3	58.09	3	80.39
4	Pernelle Carron / Lloyd Jones	France	126.94	4	53.36	4	73.58
5	Huang Xintong / Zheng Xun	China	123.10	7	49.55	5	73.55
6	Kharis Ralph / Asher Hill	Canada	121.39	6	50.50	6	70.89
7	Isabella Cannuscio / Ian Lorello	United States	116.60	5	52.19	7	64.41
8	Dora Turoczi / Balazs Major	Hungary	104.03	8	41.27	8	62.76
