= U.S. Collegiate Figure Skating Championships =

Recurring figure skating competition

The U.S. Collegiate Figure Skating Championships (previously National Collegiate Championships), are a collegiate figure skating competition sanctioned by U.S. Figure Skating. It is the highest level at which figure skating takes place at the college level in the United States. The event has been held since 1985. The event takes place in August of the calendar year, and generally at the beginning of the figure skating season.

Eligible skaters must be on the junior or senior levels and must be enrolled at a college or university. Skaters compete in the disciplines of men's singles and women's singles. Previous competitors include Paul Wylie, Nancy Kerrigan, Sydne Vogel, and Ryan Bradley.

The event was hosted by the Skating Club of Lake Placid in Lake Placid, NY, or the Broadmoor Skating Club in Colorado Springs, CO until U.S. Figure Skating made the decision to have multiple clubs host the event in 2001. According to U.S. Figure Skating, the last compulsory figures competition at a national level was held at the 2000 United States Collegiate Figure Skating Championships in Colorado Springs, Colorado.

As of 2009, U.S. Figure Skating’s Athlete Development Committee announced that the top two senior ladies and men will be assigned to an international competition.

== Senior Medalists ==
=== Men's singles ===
Year	Location	Gold	Silver	Bronze	Pewter	Ref.
1985	Lake Placid	Robert Rosenbluth	David Jamison	Tom Zakrajsek	No pewter medal awarded	
1986	Lake Placid	Paul Wylie	Tom Zakrajsek	William Lawe	No pewter medal awarded	
1987	Colorado Springs	Steven Rice	Kelby Riley	No other competitors	No pewter medal awarded	
1988	Colorado Springs	Steven Rice	Troy Goldstein	Robin Lewis	No pewter medal awarded	
1989	Lake Placid	Eddie Shipstad	Troy Goldstein	Tim Dever	No pewter medal awarded	
1990	Lake Placid	Troy Goldstein	Alex Chang	Gene 'Gi G' Siruno	No pewter medal awarded	
1991	Lake Placid	Alex Chang	Edmund Nesti	No other competitors	No pewter medal awarded	
1992-1997	No competition held				No pewter medal awarded	
1998	Colorado Springs	Justin Dillon	Danny Clausen	Janusz McKinnon	No pewter medal awarded	
1999	Colorado Springs	Derrick Delmore	Eric Schroyer	Janusz McKinnon	No pewter medal awarded	
2000	Colorado Springs	Joseph Knazek	Eric Schroyer	Don Baldwin	No pewter medal awarded	
2001	Colorado Springs	Don Baldwin	Rusty Fein	William Rasmussen	No pewter medal awarded	
2002	Newark	Sean Calvillo	Rusty Fein	Joseph Knazek	No pewter medal awarded	
2003	Minneapolis	Braden Overett	Sean Calvillo	Michael Sasaki	No pewter medal awarded	
2004	Troy	Daniel Steffel	Sean Calvillo	Luke Capizzo	No pewter medal awarded	
2005	Honolulu	Ryan Bradley	Robert Crowley	Sean Calvillo	No pewter medal awarded	
2006	Anaheim	Ryan Bradley	Michael Peters	Michael Solonoski	No pewter medal awarded	
2007	Oxford	Ryan Bradley	Michael Peters	Michael Solonoski	No pewter medal awarded	
2008	Arvada	Jason Wong	Jonathan Cassar	Michael Solonoski	No pewter medal awarded	
2009	Philadelphia	Jason Wong	Michael Solonoski	Osadolo Irown	No pewter medal awarded	
2010	East Lansing	Grant Hochstein	Curran Oi	William Brewster	No other competitors	
2011	Sun Valley	Grant Hochstein	No other competitors			
2012	South Dennis	Kevin Coppola	Matthew McAvoy	No other competitors		
2013	De Pere	Stephen Carriere	Sebastien Payannet	Daniel Palmeri	No other competitors	
2014	Rochester Hills	Richard Dornbush	Daniel Palmeri	Alexander Newman	Matthew Essigmann	
2015	Pittsburgh	Richard Dornbush	Max Aaron	Alexander Johnson	Patrick Rupp	
2016	Westminster	Max Aaron	No other competitors			
2017	Adrian	Kevin Shum	Alexander DiCola	No other competitors		
2018	Adrian	Kevin Shum	No other competitors			
2019	Aston	Joonsoo Kim	Daniel Kulenkamp	Tony Lu	Justin Wichmann	
2020	No competition held due to COVID-19 pandemic					
2021	Aston	Ryan Dunk	Joonsoo Kim	Luke Ferrante	Paul Yeung	
2022	Richfield	Ryan Dunk	Goku Endo	Luke Ferrante	Ian Kang	
2023	San Jose	Michael Xie	Eric Sjoberg	Goku Endo	Lucas Altieri	
2024	Richfield	Joonsoo Kim	Goku Endo	Philip Baker	Will Annis	
2025	Flossmoor	Taira Shinohara	No other competitors			

=== Women's singles ===
Year	Location	Gold	Silver	Bronze	Pewter	Ref.
1985	Lake Placid	Kathaleen Kelly	Deborah Tucker	Holly Archinal	No pewter medal awarded	
1986	Lake Placid	Jan Bombassei	Kathaleen Kelly	Kristin Kriwanek	No pewter medal awarded	
1987	Colorado Springs	Kathaleen Kelly	Cristen Wisner	Cara Schultz	No pewter medal awarded	
1988	Colorado Springs	Nancy Kerrigan	Kelly Szmurlo	Carla Schultz	No pewter medal awarded	
1989	Lake Placid	Michelle Millikan	Kathaleen Kelly	Melia Heimbuck	No pewter medal awarded	
1990	Lake Placid	Leanna Naczynski	Julie Shott	Sara Mulholland	No pewter medal awarded	
1991	Lake Placid	Dena Galech	Leanna Naczynski	Kathryn Curielli	No pewter medal awarded	
1992	Lake Placid	Sara Kastner	Shirl Cattani	Elizabeth Koepf	No pewter medal awarded	
1993	Colorado Springs	Sara Kastner	Shirl Marie Cattani	Kristin Buckler	No pewter medal awarded	
1994	Colorado Springs	Kathaleen Kelly Cutone	Amanda Farkas	Sabrina Vora	No pewter medal awarded	
1995	Colorado Springs	Angela Meduna	Tamari Boni	Kimberly R. Cole	No pewter medal awarded	
1996	Colorado Springs	Diane Halber	Anika Ryan	Valerie Moskwa	No pewter medal awarded	
1997	Lake Placid	Kimberly Cole	Kristy Evans	Sara Kastner	No pewter medal awarded	
1998	Colorado Springs	Sydne Vogel	Kristy Evans	Kimberly Cole	No pewter medal awarded	
1999	Colorado Springs	Milissa Parker	Alexandra Kaye	Kananililiakepela Malama	No pewter medal awarded	
2000	Colorado Springs	Kristie Evans	Mackenzie Baltz	Diane Chen	No pewter medal awarded	
2001	Colorado Springs	Angie Vandermissen	Ashklet Wilcox	Kristin Bagby	No pewter medal awarded	
2002	Newark	Heather Aseltine	Kristin Bagby	Melissa Parker	No pewter medal awarded	
2003	Minneapolis	Jennifer Don	Lisa Horstman	Angie Lien	No pewter medal awarded	
2004	Troy	Alissa Czisny	Michelle Rosinski	Amber Czisny	No pewter medal awarded	
2005	Honolulu	Amy Evidente	Stephanie Roth	Jane Bugaeva	No pewter medal awarded	
2006	Anaheim	Stephanie Roth	Erin Reed	Anna Madorsky	No pewter medal awarded	
2007	Oxford	Linsey Ann Stucks	Lindsey Weber	Ameena Sheikh	No pewter medal awarded	
2008	Arvada	Alissa Czisny	Amy Nunn	Abigail Legg	No pewter medal awarded	
2009	Philadelphia	Chelsea Morrow	Tatyana Khazova	Lynzee Broussard	No pewter medal awarded	
2010	East Lansing	Karen Zhou	Brittney Rizo	Chelsea Morrow	Christina-Maria Sperduto	
2011	Sun Valley	Alicia Hsu	Roxanna Schmidt	Karen Zhou	Kristina Struthwolf	
2012	South Dennis	Chrissy Hughes	Kacie Kotnik	Becky Berseswill	Amber Walczyk	
2013	De Pere	Farah Sheikh	Ola Czyzewski	Courtney Taylor	Margaux Guysinger	
2014	Rochester Hills	Jessica Hu	Katie McBeath	Yasmin Siraj	Isabelle Dow	
2015	Pittsburgh	Mirai Nagasu	Angela Wang	Maria Yang	Alexis Gagnon	
2016	Westminster	Angela Wang	Alexis Gagnon	Grace Moyer	Elena Pulkinen	
2017	Adrian	Katie McBeath	Heidi Munger	Nadine Wang	Alexis Gagnon	
2018	Adrian	Nhi Do	Heidi Munger	Kristine Levitina	Cailey Weaver	
2019	Aston	Heidi Munger	Kristine Levitina	Gabriela Godin	Madelyn Crawford	
2020	No competition held due to COVID-19 pandemic					
2021	Aston	Paige Rydberg	Emma Coppess	Anna Li	Kristine Levitina	
2022	Richfield	Paige Rydberg	Audrey Lu	Wren Warne-Jacobsen	Ting Cui	
2023	San Jose	Wren Warne-Jacobsen	Lindsay Wang	Brynn Roberts	Erica Machida	
2024	Richfield	Wren Warne-Jacobsen	Alena Budko	Lilah Gibson	Ting Cui	
2025	Flossmoor	Kendall Erne	Clare Seo	Maryn Pierce	Wren Warne-Jacobsen	

=== Pairs ===
Year	Location	Gold	Silver	Bronze	Ref.
1987	Colorado Springs	Lori Blasko / Todd Sand	Sara Powell / Robert Powell	Shanda Smith / Brandon Smith	
1988	Colorado Springs	Calla Urbanski / Mark Naylor	Julianne Thompson / Brian Geddeis	No other competitors	
1989	Lake Placid	Calla Urbanski / Mark Naylor	Maria Lako / Rocky Marval	Dawn Goldstein / Troy Goldstein	
1990	Lake Placid	Laura Murphy / Brian Wells	Dawn Goldstein / Troy Goldstein	No other competitors	

=== Ice dance ===
Year	Location	Gold	Silver	Bronze	Ref.
1990	Lake Placid	Rachel Mayer / Peter Breen	Amy Webster / Leif Erickson	Elizabeth Punsalen / Jerod Swallow	

=== Men's figures ===
Year	Location	Gold	Silver	Bronze	Ref.
1986	Lake Placid	Paul Wylie	William Lawe	Tom Zakrajsek	
1987	Colorado Springs	Steven Rice	Kelby Riley	No other competitors	
1988	Colorado Springs	Troy Goldstein	Steven Rice	Kelby Riley	
1989	Lake Placid	Eddie Shipstand	Tim Dever	Troy Goldstein	
1990	Lake Placid	Troy Goldstein	Jay Murphy	No other competitors	

=== Women's figures ===
Year	Location	Gold	Silver	Bronze	Ref.
1986	Lake Placid	Eileen Groth	Kathaleen Kelly	Stefanie Schmid	
1987	Colorado Springs	Kathaleen Kelly	Becky Dever	Noreen Kelly	
1988	Colorado Springs	Kelly Szmurlo	Kathaleen Kelly	Nancy Kerrigan	
1989	Lake Placid	Kathaleen Kelly	Melia Heimbuck	Shannon Hunter	
1990	Lake Placid	Jennifer Leng	Sara Mulholland	Samantha Hawks	
1991	Lake Placid	Samantha Hawks	Heather Hughes	Carese Busby	
1992	Lake Placid	Sarah Gendreau	Carese M. Busby	Doreen Raudenbush	
1993	Colorado Springs	Shirl Marie Cattani	Doreen Raudenbush	Laura L. Mitchell	
1994	Colorado Springs	Lisa Bryson	Janette Lynn Lewis	Shannon Livingston	
1995	Colorado Springs	Jessica Rainey	Doreen Raudenbush	Shannon Livingston	
1996	Colorado Springs	Susan Blaisdell	Jennifer Finley	Jennie Pitman	
1997	Lake Placid	Casey Papajohn	Lynne Petta	Amy Brolsma	
1998	Colorado Springs	Amanda Adams	Lynne Petta	Amy Thompson	
1999	Colorado Springs	Casey Papajohn	Tracy Dedrick	Brooke Pitman	
2000	Colorado Springs	Jessic Koslow	Brooke Pitman	Wendy Mangum	

== Junior Medalists ==
=== Men's singles ===
Year	Location	Gold	Silver	Bronze	Pewter	Ref.
1989	Lake Placid	Edmund Nesti	Glenn Zeihnert		No pewter medal awarded	
1990	Lake Placid	Glenn Zeihnert	Kevin Howell	Leon Nesti	No pewter medal awarded	
1991-95	No competition held				No pewter medal awarded	
1996	Colorado Springs	Everett Weiss	Robert Schupp	Aaron Parchem	No pewter medal awarded	
1997	Lake Placid	Eric Schroyer	Jason Heffron	Janusz John McKinnon	No pewter medal awarded	
1998	Colorado Springs	Derek Trent	Eric Schroyer	Jason Heffron	No pewter medal awarded	
1999	Colorado Springs	Matthew Bohannan	Derek Trent	Adam Collins	No pewter medal awarded	
2000	Colorado Springs	Rusty Fein	Matthew Bohanan	Mark Butt	No pewter medal awarded	
2001	Colorado Springs	Michael Turner	Luke Capizzo	No other competitors	No pewter medal awarded	
2002	Newark	Luke Mafazy	Daniel Eison	No other competitors	No pewter medal awarded	
2003	Minneapolis	Michael Turner	Nicholas Krongard	Jonathan Hayward	No pewter medal awarded	
2004	Troy	Jonathan Cassar	Nicholas Roby	Darryll Sulindro	No pewter medal awarded	
2005	Honolulu	Taylor Toth	Pine Kopka-Ross	Schuyler Eldridge	No pewter medal awarded	
2006	Anaheim	Jason Wong	Jonathan Cassar	Michael Solonoski	No pewter medal awarded	
2007-09	No competition held				No pewter medal awarded	
2010	East Lansing	Zachariah Szabo	Joey Millet	No other competitors		
2011	Sun Valley	Austin Stephen	Adam Civiello	Jason Pacini	No other competitors	
2012	South Dennis	Matej Silecky	Christian Burner	Jonathan Jerothe	No other competitors	
2013	No competition held					
2014	Rochester Hills	Danny Neudecker	Kevin Wu	Scott Brody	No other competitors	
2015	Pittsburgh	B.J. Conrad	Andrew Civiello	Kevin Wu	Scott Brody	
2016	Westminster	Max Belovol	Andrew Civiello	No other competitors		
2017	Adrian	Thomas Schwappach	Andrew Civello	No other competitors		
2018	Adrian	Manol Atanassov	Thomas Schwappach	No other competitors		
2019	Aston	Matthew Kennedy	Thomas Schwappach	Kenneth Thomsen	No other competitors	
2020	No competition held due to COVID-19 pandemic					
2021	Aston	Goku Endo	Kenneth Thomsen	No other competitors		
2022	Richfield	Michael Chapa	Ryan Siracuse	Matthew Mlachak	Gabriel Martinez	
2023	San Jose	Andriy Kratyuk	Kelvin Li	Samir Mallya	Zachary Fogt	
2024	Richfield	Solomon Bristol	Vladimir Volkov	Zachary Fogt	Ryan Siracuse	
2025	Flossmoor	Solomon Bristol	Anton Yakunin	Zachary Fogt	No other competitors	

=== Women's singles ===
Year	Location	Gold	Silver	Bronze	Pewter	Ref.
1989	Lake Placid	Lisa Floreck	Sandra Davis	Tracy Lynn Martin	No pewter medal awarded	
1990	Lake Placid	Dana Chinn	Kristy Kaapis	Jessa Eisenwinter-Lake	No pewter medal awarded	
1991	Lake Placid	Shirl Cattani	Ingrid Peterson	Amy Zurlinden	No pewter medal awarded	
1992	Lake Placid	Amy Ross	Desiree V. Toneatto	Jennifer Jamison	No pewter medal awarded	
1993	Colorado Springs	Wendy Budzynski	Michelle Lindberg	Elin Gardiner	No pewter medal awarded	
1994	Colorado Springs	Amy Lynn Love	Sabrina Voncampe	Brenda Blackmer	No pewter medal awarded	
1995	Colorado Springs	Tiffany E. Scott	Lisa Mason	Cyndy Livingston	No pewter medal awarded	
1996	Colorado Springs	Sara Robertson	Maiysha Glaude	Kimberly Landis	No pewter medal awarded	
1997	Lake Placid	Carrie Lynne Istad	Olivia Baer	Maiysha Glaude	No pewter medal awarded	
1998	Colorado Springs	Alexandra Dunne-Bryant	Maiysha Gloude	Caitlin Marino	No pewter medal awarded	
1999	Colorado Springs	Megan McAndrew	Kristin Dean	Lisa Grasso	No pewter medal awarded	
2000	Colorado Springs	Jacqueline Matson	Averil Davis	Amy Stetson-de Jesus	No pewter medal awarded	
2001	Colorado Springs	Christina Branom	Stephanie O'Leary	Chanelle Sherry	No pewter medal awarded	
2002	Newark	Marlowe Perry	Sarah Kaulfers	Christina Branom	No pewter medal awarded	
2003	Minneapolis	Sara Holwerda	Andrea Pinter	Tiffany Chung	No pewter medal awarded	
2004	Troy	Rachel Baisch	Lauren Roman	Andrea Vickers	No pewter medal awarded	
2005	Honolulu	Laura Stefanik	Andrea Vickers	Danielle VanPatten	No pewter medal awarded	
2006	Anaheim	Andrea Vickers	Jazmyn Manzouri	Kelsey Willden	No pewter medal awarded	
2007	Oxford	Laura Stefanik	Rachel Nevares	Jazmyn Manzouri	No pewter medal awarded	
2008	Arvada	Lindsey Roman	Lexi Ibanez	Erica Ransford	No pewter medal awarded	
2009	Philadelphia	Audrey Winter	Alicia Warren	Leah Roth Barsanti	No pewter medal awarded	
2010	East Lansing	Bethany Bonenfant	Courtney Donovan	Leah Barsanti	Connie Przeslawski	
2011	Sun Valley	Kirsten Seagers	Caroline Knoop	Katie Soraghan	Connie Przeslawski	
2012	South Dennis	Natalie Motley	Caroline Knoop	Alexis McDonnell	Flora Su	
2013	De Pere	Kaitlyn Young	Flora Su	Gillian Gonzalez	Chrystal Chilcott	
2014	Rochester Hills	Kathleen Criss	Amber Guizzotti	Jacquelin Zimmerman	Bridget Race	
2015	Pittsburgh	Taylor Aruanno	Brittany Lee	Kathleen Criss	Gillian Gonzalez	
2016	Westminster	Sarah Goodwin	Caterina Alf	Kaitlin D'Agostino	Brittany Lee	
2017	Adrian	Nicole Farolan	Nicole Czuhajewski	Kaitlin D'Agostino	Gabrielle Carl	
2018	Adrian	Nicole Czuhajewski	Lauren Russell	Elizabeth Klemm	Shannen Wu	
2019	Aston	Ejun Dean	Valentina Plazas	Beverly Laksana	Maya Jones	
2020	No competition held due to COVID-19 pandemic					
2021	Aston	Lily Rauh	Olivia Tennant	Maya Jones	Madelyn Lyons	
2022	Richfield	Elizabeth Swanson	Bailey Onixt	Christina Tenzin	Amanda Smentkowski	
2023	San Jose	Lindsey Byer	Talia Lerner	Jayna Hosman	Grace Clifford	
2024	Richfield	Bailey Onixt	Genella Evans	Caroline Mura	Kelly Janetzko	
2025	Flossmoor	Emmalee Carlson	Madeline Benson	Caroline Mura	Lillianna Fish	

=== Pairs ===
Year	Location	Gold	Silver	Bronze	Ref.
1988	Colorado Springs	Jocelyn Cox / Brad Cox	Dawn Piepenbrink / Tim Dever	Dawn Goldstein / Troy Goldstein	
1990	Lake Placid	Dawn Piepenbrink / Nick Castaneda	Jamie-Maria Sharpe / David Walker	No other competitors	
1991	Lake Placid	Andrea Catoia / Paul Dulebohn	Erin Covington / Brandon Powell	Heather Hughes / Keith Tindall	
1992	Lake Placid	Erin Covington / Brandon Powell	Akemi L. Kawaguchi / Ron Brilliant	No other competitors	
1997	Lake Placid	Darby Gaynor / Robert Van Uitert Jr	Whitney Gaynor / David Delago	No other competitors	

=== Ice dance ===
Year	Location	Gold	Silver	Bronze	Ref.
1987	Colorado Springs	Holly Robbins / Jonathan Stine	Regina Woodward / James Curtis	Elisa Curtis / Neale Smull	
1988	Colorado Springs	Wendy Millette / James Curtis	Andrea Chow / Martin Chow	Elisa Curtis / Neale Smull	
1989	Lake Placid	Beth Nuhl / Neal Smull	Michelle Maler / Tony Darnell	No other competitors	
1990	Lake Placid	Laura Gayton / Peter Abraham	Tarah Donelan / Gerald Miele	Kathy Binkowski / Sean Gales	
1991	Lake Placid	Siann Matthews / Jeremy Wyndham	Melissa Pettus / Richard Dupaix	Susan Mounce / Kevin Elvin	
1993	Colorado Springs	Daniela Lopez / Andras Lopez	Jenny Dahlen / Sergei Lihachov	Mary Spencer / Terry Summe	
1995	Colorado Springs	Azumi Sagara / Jonathan Magalnick	Mary Spenser / Michael Phaneuf	No other competitors	
1996	Colorado Springs	Mollie Klurfeld / Martin Sivorinovsky	Karen Ferrara / Colin Ward	No other competitors	
2009	Philadelphia	Katherine Zeigler / Baxter Burbank	Janine Ashley-Halstead / Robert Knopf Jr	No other competitors	

=== Men's figures ===
Year	Location	Gold	Silver	Bronze	Ref.
1989	Lake Placid	Glenn Zeiehnert	Edmund Nesti	No other competitors	
1990	Lake Placid	Glenn Zeiehnert	Kevin Howell	Edmund Nesti	

=== Women's figures ===
Year	Location	Gold	Silver	Bronze	Ref.
1989	Lake Placid	Lisa Floreck	Sandra Davis	Tracey Lynn Martin	
1990	Lake Placid	Janet Lynn Melville	Kelly Nearon	Margaret Ann Reynolds	
1991	Lake Placid	Cathleen Reynolds	Tiffany Purcell	Laura Mitchell	
1992	Lake Placid	Desiree V. Toneatto	Bonnie Good	Rhonda Binnebose	
1993	Colorado Springs	Elisa M. Goldberg	Heather Castor	Jennifer Ellis	
1994	Colorado Springs	Sonja Castaneda	Nicole Buckles	Sametra Wallace	
1995	Colorado Springs	Nicole Buckles	Kelley Young	Sametra L. Wallace	
1996	Colorado Springs	Kelley Young	Michelle Nathan	Michelle Becklehamer	
1997	Lake Placid	Michelle Nathan	Shannon Edens	Mya Zapata	
1998	Colorado Springs	Danielle Detrolio	Christina Edwards	No other competitors	
2000	Colorado Springs	Angela Marquart	Marika Perry	No other competitors	

== See also ==
- Intercollegiate sports team champions § Figure Skating
