= Pam Gregory =

American figure skating coach

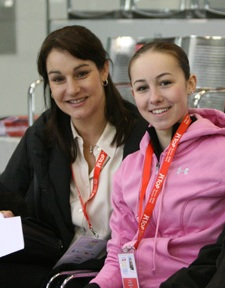
Gregory with former student Kimmie Meissner in 2007.

Pamela Gregory (née Duane) is an American figure skating coach and former competitor. She coaches at the University of Delaware Figure Skating Club and has trained many skaters, most notably Kimmie Meissner. Gregory is married to Scott Gregory. They have one daughter, Victoria.

As a competitive skater, Gregory passed her gold test, allowing her to skate at the senior level. However to be competitive, she would have had to leave home to pursue her career, and Gregory was not willing to do that. She quit competition and began to work for her coach, Linda Monney, as an assistant coach. She skated professionally in The Next Ice Age, a skating company. Gregory began working at the University of Delaware rink in 1990 and previously coached Scott Smith, Jeff Merica, Chrisha Gossard, Sara Wheat, Kelsey Drewel, and Christine Zukowski. Gregory has been Meissner's main coach since Meissner's novice season.
