= Riga Cup =

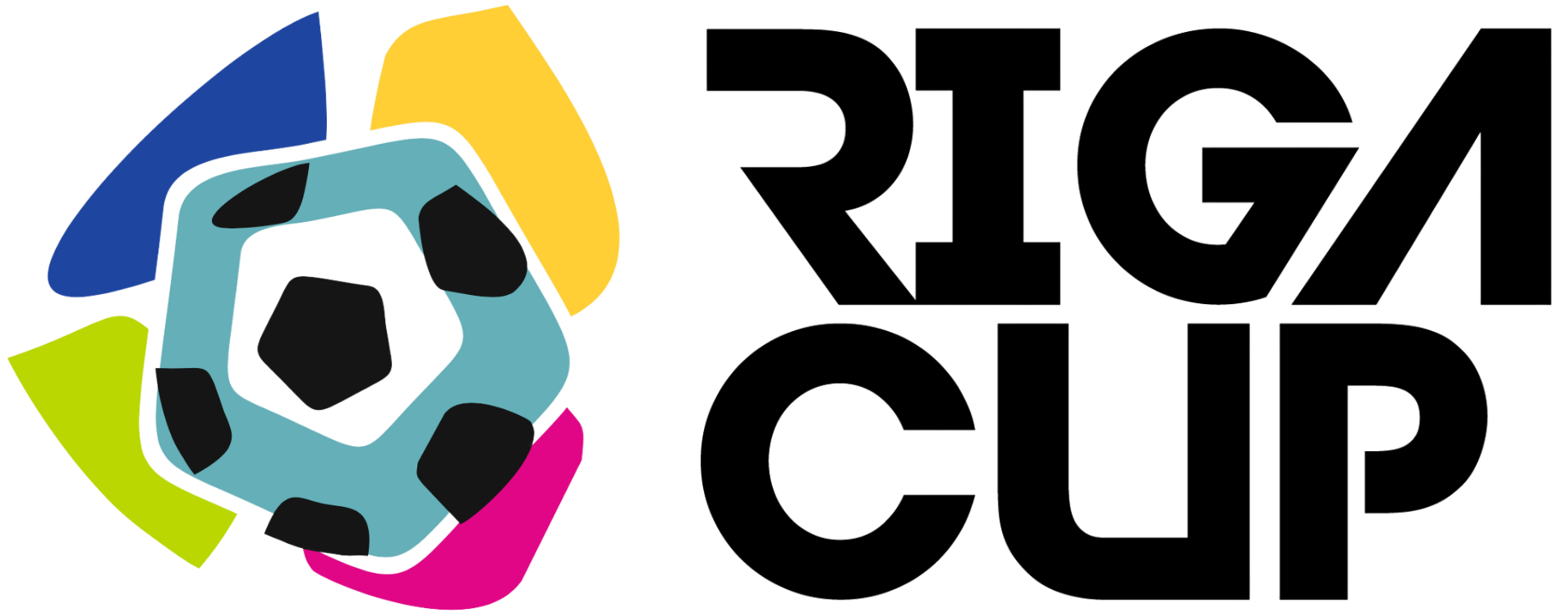
Riga Cup logo

Riga Cup is an international youth football tournament held in Riga, Latvia. It has been organized since 2000. The tournament is usually played in winter in indoor football halls.

Teams from different European countries take part in the event. Some well-known participating clubs include Manchester City, Juventus, Tottenham Hotspur, Espanyol, Werder Bremen and Dynamo Kyiv, Atalanta, Sampdoria, and Zenit.

The tournament has also been included in UEFA Training Ground material about youth football.
