= Taylor Toth =

American pair skater (born 1989)

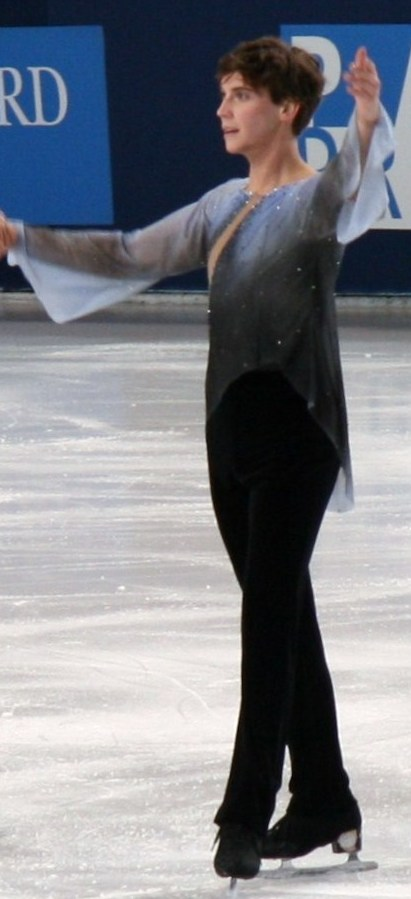
- Taylor Toth at the 2010 Trophée Eric Bompard

Personal information
- Full name: Taylor John Toth
- Born: July 22, 1989 (age 37) Pittsburgh, Pennsylvania
- Home town: Kittanning, Pennsylvania
- Height: 5 ft 11 in (1.80 m)

Figure skating career
- Country: United States
- Coach: Jeremy Allen
- Skating club: University of Delaware FSC
- Began skating: 1995

Taylor Toth (born July 22, 1989) is an American pair skater. He is best known for his partnership with Felicia Zhang from 2009 to 2011. Together, they won the junior title at the 2010 U.S. Championships and placed ninth at the 2010 World Junior Championships.

== Career ==
Early in his pairs career, Toth competed with Kylie Gleason. They won medals on the juvenile and intermediate levels. From 2004 through 2005, Toth competed with Molly Aaron. They competed on the 2005–2006 ISU Junior Grand Prix at two events. They are the 2005 U.S. novice pewter medalists. Their partnership ended before the 2006 U.S. Championships.

As a single skater, Toth won the junior level title at the 2007 U.S. Collegiate Championships.

Toth teamed up with Felicia Zhang in 2009. They won the junior gold medal at the 2010 U.S. Championships. They finished 9th at the 2010 World Junior Championships.

Zhang/Toth moved up to the senior level for the 2010–11 season and competed in the Grand Prix at Skate America, where they finished 7th, and Trophée Eric Bompard, where they finished 5th. They withdrew from the 2011 U.S. Championships due to Zhang's rib injuries. On March 10, 2011, Zhang and Toth announced they had parted ways. During their partnership, they were coached by Jeff DiGregorio in Newark, Delaware.

On March 23, 2012, it was announced that Toth had teamed up with Kiri Baga. In May 2014, it was announced that his partner, Kiri Baga, had decided to stop training for elite competition.

== Personal life ==
Toth graduated from the University of Delaware in 2011. He is active in the USFS Athlete Advisory Committee. He works for Marc Jacobs International in New York City.

== Programs ==
(with Zhang)

Season	Short program	Free skating	Exhibition
2010–2011	Claire de Lune by Claude Debussy	Miss Saigon Rhapsody by Claude-Michel Schönberg, Alain Boublil performed by the Bournemouth Symphony Orchestra	Orange Colored Sky
2009–2010	Chamber music performed by Rondò Veneziano	Wonderland performed by Maksim Mrvica; Queen medley	Like a Prayer by Madonna

== Competitive highlights ==
=== With Zhang ===
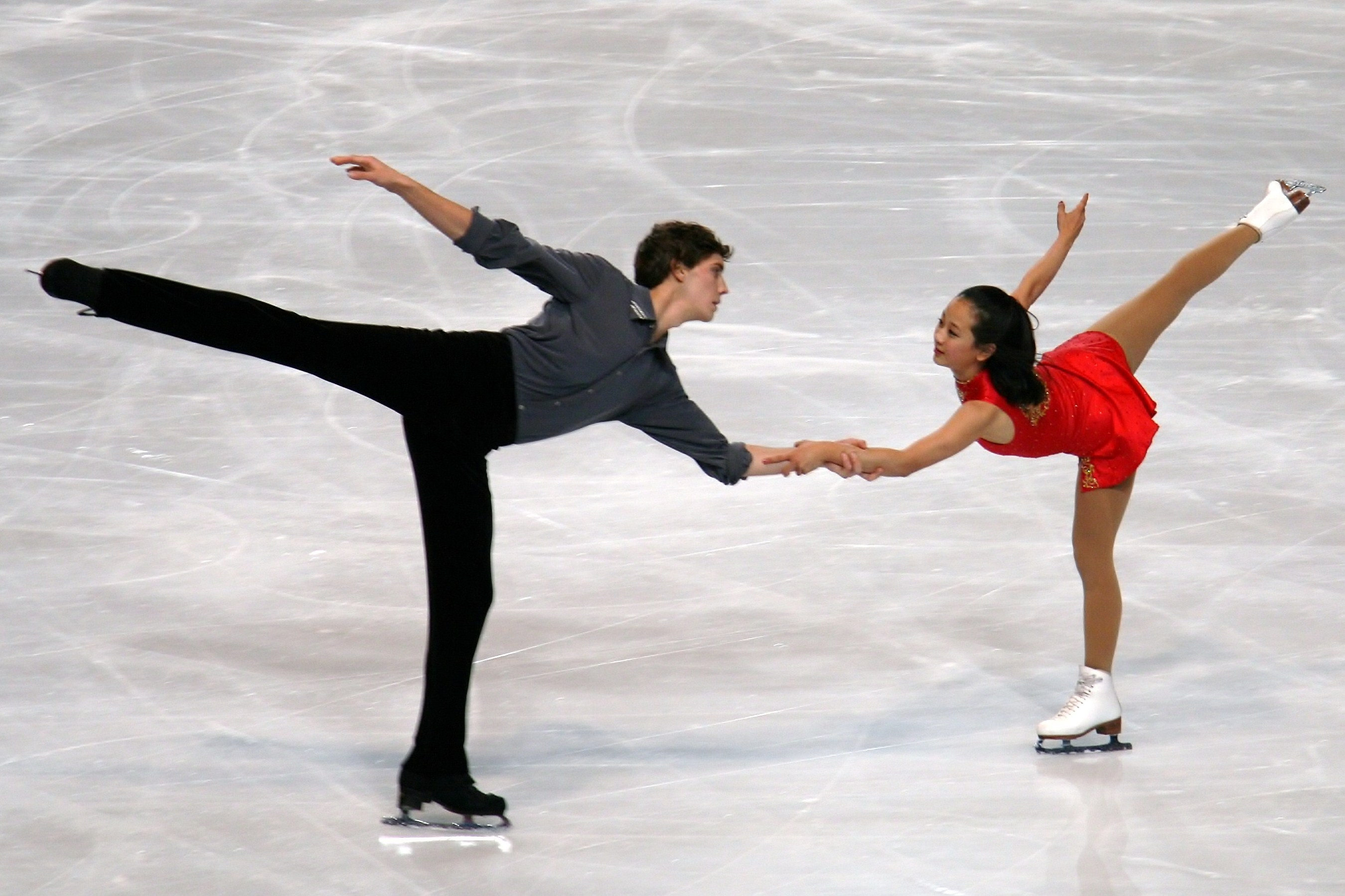
Felicia Zhang and Taylor Toth in their free skate at the 2010 Trophée Eric Bompard

International
Event	2009–10	2010–11
GP Skate America		7th
GP Trophée Eric Bompard		5th
Nebelhorn Trophy		7th
International: Junior
World Junior Championships	9th	
JGP Germany	11th	
JGP Poland	6th	
National
U.S. Championships	1st J.	WD

=== With Aaron ===
International
Event	2005–06
JGP Canada	5th
JGP Slovakia	4th
