= Tiffany Scott =

American figure skater (born 1977)

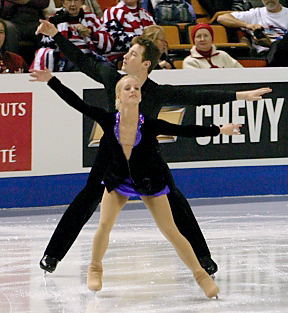
- Scott competes with former partner Philip Dulebohn in 2004.

Personal information
- Born: May 1, 1977 (age 49)
- Height: 5 ft 0.5 in (154 cm)

Figure skating career
- Country: United States
Medal record
Representing the United States
Pairs' Figure skating
Four Continents Championships
Bronze medal – third place	2000 Osaka	Pairs

Tiffany Scott (born May 1, 1977) is an American figure skater.

Scott was born in Hanson, Massachusetts. She skated with Philip Dulebohn until 2005. They competed at the 2002 Olympic Games and won the pairs title at the 2003 U.S. Championships. In 2005, Dulebohn retired from competition and Scott teamed up with Rusty Fein. Dulebohn was one of the pair's coaches during their brief partnership. Scott and Fein finished 4th at their first and only U.S. Figure Skating Championships in 2006.

Away from the ice, Scott married Brian Pryor in 2005. In May 2006, Scott announced her retirement from competitive skating. In March 2012, the couple had a son.

In the 2007 film Blades of Glory, Scott served as Amy Poehler's stunt double.

== Programs ==
(with Dulebohn)

Season	Short program	Free skating
2004–2005	Once Upon a Time in Mexico: La Cucaracha; Malaguena	Xotica (from Cirque du Soleil by René Dupéré
2003–2004	Farandole (from L'Arlésienne, Suite No. 2) by Georges Bizet	Les Misérables by Claude-Michel Schönberg performed by the Royal Philharmonic Orchestra
1999–2000	Improviso	Symphonic Dances Opus 45 by Sergei Rachmaninoff

(with Fein)

Season	Short program	Free skating
2004–2005	Cries of Beirut by Dana Dragomir	Force of Destiny by Verdi

== Results ==
=== With Dulebohn ===
Results
International
Event	1997–98	1998–99	1999–00	2000–01	2001–02	2002–03	2003–04	2004–05
Olympics					13th			
Worlds			9th	11th	7th	9th		
Four Continents		5th	3rd	5th		5th	8th	
GP Cup of China								5th
GP Cup of Russia				8th			7th	7th
GP Lalique			6th				3rd	
GP Skate America			6th	5th		6th	5th	
GP Skate Canada						5th		
Karl Schäfer				2nd				
National
U.S. Champ.	8th	5th	2nd	2nd	2nd	1st	3rd	4th
GP = Grand Prix

=== With Fein ===
International
Event	2005–2006
Nebelhorn Trophy	5th
National
U.S. Championships	4th
