= Philip Dulebohn =

American pair skater

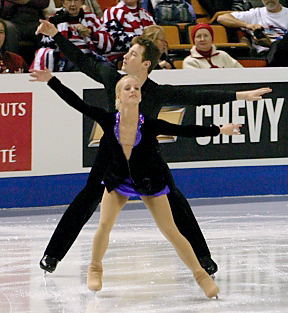
- Dulebohn competes with former partner Tiffany Scott in 2004.

Personal information
- Born: September 13, 1973 (age 53) Silver Spring, Maryland, United States
- Height: 5 ft 9 in (175 cm)

Figure skating career
- Country: United States
Medal record
Representing United States
Pairs' Figure skating
Four Continents Championships
Bronze medal – third place	2000 Osaka	Pairs

Philip Dulebohn (born September 13, 1973, in Silver Spring, Maryland) is an American retired pair skater. He competed in pairs with partner Tiffany Scott, and the duo won the gold medal at the 2003 U.S. Figure Skating Championships. He and Scott ended their partnership in 2005, and now Dulebohn coaches at the University of Delaware ice arena in Newark, Delaware.

His brother, Paul Dulebohn, was also a competitive skater.

== Results ==
=== Men's singles ===
Event	1990	1992	1996	1997
U.S. Championships	6th J	9th J	16th	13th

=== Pairs with Tiffany Scott ===
Results
International
Event	1997–98	1998–99	1999–00	2000–01	2001–02	2002–03	2003–04	2004–05
Olympics					13th			
Worlds			9th	11th	7th	9th		
Four Continents		5th	3rd	5th		5th	8th	
GP Cup of China								5th
GP Cup of Russia				8th			7th	7th
GP Lalique			6th				3rd	
GP Skate America			6th	5th		6th	5th	
GP Skate Canada						5th		
Karl Schäfer				2nd				
National
U.S. Champ.	8th	5th	2nd	2nd	2nd	1st	3rd	4th
GP = Grand Prix

== Programs ==
(with Scott)

Season	Short program	Free skating
2004–2005	Once Upon a Time in Mexico: La Cucaracha; Malaguena	Xotica (from Cirque du Soleil by René Dupéré
2003–2004	Farandole (from L'Arlésienne, Suite No. 2) by Georges Bizet	Les Misérables by Claude-Michel Schönberg performed by the Royal Philharmonic Orchestra
1999–2000	Improviso	Symphonic Dances Opus 45 by Sergei Rachmaninoff
