= 2005 U.S. Figure Skating Championships =

Figure skating competition

- Type: National Championship
- Date: January 9 – 16
- Season: 2004–05
- Location: Portland, Oregon
- Venue: Rose Garden

Champions
- Men's singles: Johnny Weir
- Ladies' singles: Michelle Kwan
- Pairs: Kathryn Orscher / Garrett Lucash
- Ice dance: Tanith Belbin / Benjamin Agosto
- Previous: 2004 U.S. Championships
- Next: 2006 U.S. Championships

The 2005 U.S. Figure Skating Championships took place on January 9–16, 2005 at the Rose Garden in Portland, Oregon. Medals were awarded in four colors: gold (first), silver (second), bronze (third), and pewter (fourth) in four disciplines – men's singles, ladies' singles, pair skating, and ice dancing – across three levels: senior, junior, and novice.

The event was used to determine the U.S. teams for the 2005 World Championships, 2005 Four Continents Championships, and 2005 World Junior Championships.

== Senior results ==
=== Men ===
Rank	Name	TFP	SP	FS
1	Johnny Weir	2.0	2	1
2	Timothy Goebel	2.5	1	2
3	Evan Lysacek	4.5	3	3
4	Matthew Savoie	6.0	4	4
5	Michael Weiss	7.5	5	5
6	Shaun Rogers	10.0	6	7
7	Derrick Delmore	10.5	9	6
8	Nicholas LaRoche	13.0	8	9
9	Scott Smith	14.5	7	11
10	Braden Overett	15.5	15	8
11	Jordan Brauninger	15.5	11	10
12	Jordan Wilson	18.0	12	12
13	Ryan Jahnke	18.0	10	13
14	Wesley Campbell	21.5	13	15
15	Jason Wong	23.0	18	14
16	Parker Pennington	24.0	16	16
17	Daniel Steffel	24.0	14	17
18	Mauro Bruni	26.5	17	18
19	Pierre Balian	28.5	19	19
WD	Dennis Phan			

=== Ladies ===
Rank	Name	TFP	SP	FS
1	Michelle Kwan	1.5	1	1
2	Sasha Cohen	3.0	2	2
3	Kimmie Meissner	5.0	4	3
4	Jennifer Kirk	5.5	3	4
5	Beatrisa Liang	7.5	5	5
6	Emily Hughes	10.5	9	6
7	Alissa Czisny	11.0	8	7
8	Amber Corwin	11.5	7	8
9	Katy Taylor	13.0	6	10
10	Megan Williams-Stewart	14.0	10	9
11	Danielle Kahle	17.0	12	11
12	Jane Bugaeva	17.5	11	12
13	Erica Archambault	19.5	13	13
14	Stephanie Rosenthal	21.0	14	14
15	Angela Lien	23.0	16	15
16	Yebin Mok	24.5	17	16
17	Katherine Hadford	25.5	15	18
18	Shanell Noji	26.0	18	17

=== Pairs ===
Rank	Name	TFP	SP	FS
1	Kathryn Orscher / Garrett Lucash	1.5	1	1
2	Rena Inoue / John Baldwin	3.0	2	2
3	Marcy Hinzmann / Aaron Parchem	5.5	3	4
4	Tiffany Scott / Philip Dulebohn	6.0	6	3
5	Amanda Evora / Mark Ladwig	7.0	4	5
6	Jennifer Don / Jonathon Hunt	8.5	5	6
7	Brooke Castile / Benjamin Okolski	11.5	7	8
8	Brittany Vise / Nicholas Kole	12.0	10	7
9	Tiffany Vise / Derek Trent	13.0	8	9
10	Shantel Jordan / Jeremy Barrett	16.0	12	10
11	Colette Appel / Lee Harris	16.5	11	11
12	Stephanie Kuban / Laureano Ibarra	17.5	9	13
13	Julian Burns / Themistocles Leftheris	19.5	15	12
14	Katie Beriau / Joseph Gazzola	20.5	13	14
15	Lauren-Marie Simm / Devin Matthews	22.0	14	15
WD	Kristen Roth / Steve Hartsell			
WD	Marisa Sharma / Amir Ganaba			

=== Ice dancing ===
Rank	Name	TFP	CD	OD	FD
1	Tanith Belbin / Benjamin Agosto	2.0	1	1	1
2	Melissa Gregory / Denis Petukhov	4.0	2	2	2
3	Lydia Manon / Ryan O'Meara	6.4	4	3	3
4	Tiffany Stiegler / Sergey Magerovskiy	9.6	3	4	6
5	Morgan Matthews / Maxim Zavozin	10.0	6	6	4
6	Kendra Goodwin / Brent Bommentre	10.0	5	5	5
7	Kate Slattery / Chuen-Gun Lee	15.0	8	8	7
8	Julia Rey / Philipp Rey	15.0	7	7	8
9	Lindsay Evans / Kevin O'Keefe	18.0	9	9	9
10	Stephanie Ellis / Ian Ross-Frye	21.0	10	10	11
11	Alisa Allapach / Benjaman Westenberger	21.4	12	11	10
12	Elizabeth Palmer / Ryland Stucke	23.6	11	12	12
13	Francesca Cheli / Alex Clark	26.0	13	13	13

== Junior results ==
=== Men ===
Rank	Name	TFP	SP	FS
1	Jeremy Abbott	1.5	1	1
2	Craig Ratterree	4.5	3	3
3	Michael Peters	5.0	6	2
4	Douglas Razzano	5.0	2	4
5	Princeton Kwong	8.5	7	5
6	Geoffry Varner	9.0	4	7
7	Stephen Carriere	10.0	8	6
8	David Weintraub	12.5	9	8
9	Casey McCraw	13.5	5	11
10	Tommy Steenberg	14.0	10	9
11	Traighe Rouse	15.5	11	10
12	John Coughlin	18.0	12	12

=== Ladies ===
Rank	Name	TFP	SP	FS
1	Sandra Jean Rucker	1.5	1	1
2	Christine Zukowski	3.5	3	2
3	Megan Oster	4.0	2	3
4	Tenile Victorsen	6.5	5	4
5	Anna Peng	8.0	4	6
6	Juliana Cannarozzo	9.0	8	5
7	Molly Oberstar	12.0	6	9
8	Danielle Shepard	12.5	11	7
9	Crystal Shum	12.5	9	8
10	Melissa Telecky	14.5	7	11
11	Margaret Wang	15.0	10	10
12	Caroline Miller	18.0	12	12

=== Pairs ===
Rank	Name	TFP	SP	FS
1	Mariel Miller / Rockne Brubaker	1.5	1	1
2	Julia Vlassov / Drew Meekins	3.5	3	2
3	Chloé Katz / Joseph Lynch	4.0	2	3
4	Keauna McLaughlin / Ethan Burgess	7.0	6	4
5	Jenna Yount / Grant Marron	8.5	5	6
6	Aaryn Smith / Will Chitwood	9.0	4	7
7	Katelyn Uhlig / Colin Loomis	9.5	9	5
8	Sydney Schmidt / Christopher Pottinger	11.5	7	8
9	Lindsey Seitz / Andy Seitz	13.0	8	9
10	Lucy Galleher / Justin Gaumond	15.0	10	10
11	Katie Boxwell / Danny Curzon	16.5	11	11
12	Tanya Aziz / Chad Brennan	19.0	14	12
13	Catherine Rigoulot / Michael Jorgens	19.0	12	13
14	Eden Delphey / Cole Davis	20.5	13	14

=== Ice dancing ===
Rank	Name	TFP	CD1	CD2	OD	FD
1	Trina Pratt / Todd Gilles	2.0	1	1	1	1
2	Caitlin Mallory / Brent Holdburg	4.2	3	2	2	2
3	Kimmerly Lauten / Augie Hill	6.8	2	3	3	4
4	Meghan McCullough / Joel Dear	7.0	4	4	4	3
5	Jane Summersett / Elliot Pennington	11.0	5	5	5	6
6	Adrienne Koob-Doddy / Robert Antonelli	11.8	8	8	6	5
7	Christina Chitwood / Stephen Chasman	13.6	6	6	7	7
8	Katherine Copely / Patrick Connelly	15.6	7	7	8	8
9	Samantha Cepican / Phillip Lichtor	18.0	9	9	9	9
10	Mauri Gustafson / Logan Giulietti-Schmitt	20.0	10	10	10	10
11	Katrina Reyes / Jon Wright	22.0	11	11	11	11
12	Stephanie Segien / Jay Lilly	24.0	12	12	12	12

== International team selections ==
=== World Championships ===
	Men	Ladies	Pairs	Ice dancing
1	Johnny Weir	Michelle Kwan	Katie Orscher / Garrett Lucash	Tanith Belbin / Ben Agosto
2	Timothy Goebel	Sasha Cohen	Rena Inoue / John Baldwin	Melissa Gregory / Denis Petukhov
3	Evan Lysacek	Jennifer Kirk		
1st alternate	Matt Savoie	Beatrisa Liang	Tiffany Scott / Philip Dulebohn	Lydia Manon / Ryan O'Meara
2nd alternate	Michael Weiss	Emily Hughes	Amanda Evora / Mark Ladwig	Morgan Matthews / Maxim Zavozin
3rd alternate	Shaun Rogers	Alissa Czisny	Jennifer Don / Jonathon Hunt	Kendra Goodwin / Brent Bommentre

=== Four Continents Championships ===
	Men	Ladies	Pairs	Ice dancing
1	Evan Lysacek	Jennifer Kirk	Katie Orscher / Garrett Lucash	Tanith Belbin / Ben Agosto
2	Matt Savoie	Beatrisa Liang	Rena Inoue / John Baldwin	Melissa Gregory / Denis Petukhov
3	Derrick Delmore	Amber Corwin	Amanda Evora / Mark Ladwig	Lydia Manon / Ryan O'Meara
1st alternate	Nicholas LaRoche	Danielle Kahle	Jennifer Don / Jonathon Hunt	Morgan Matthews / Maxim Zavozin
2nd alternate	Scott Smith	Megan Williams-Stewart	Brooke Castile / Ben Okolski	Kendra Goodwin / Brent Bommentre
3rd alternate	Braden Overett	Jane Bugaeva	Brittany Vise / Nicholas Kole	Kate Slattery / Chuen-Gun Lee

=== World Junior Championships ===
	Men	Ladies	Pairs	Ice dancing
1	Shaun Rogers	Kimmie Meissner	Mariel Miller / Rockne Brubaker	Morgan Matthews / Maxim Zavozin
2	Jordan Brauninger	Emily Hughes	Julia Vlassov / Drew Meekins	Trina Pratt / Todd Gilles
3	Dennis Phan	Alissa Czisny		
1st alternate	Wesley Campbell	Katy Taylor	Brittany Vise / Nicholas Kole	Meryl Davis / Charlie White
2nd alternate	Jason Wong	Megan Williams-Stewart	Brooke Castile / Ben Okolski	Caitlin Mallory / Brent Holdburg
3rd alternate	Craig Ratterree	Danielle Kahle	Chloé Katz / Joseph Lynch	Kimmerly Lauten / Augie Hill
