= Stars on Ice =

Touring figure skating show

Stars on Ice performance in 2014.

Stars on Ice is a touring figure skating show produced by IMG. It was co-founded in 1986 by Bob Kain, IMG executive, and Scott Hamilton, the 1984 Olympic Gold Medalist in men's figure skating. The production is a theatrical show featuring a small cast of elite skaters who perform together in ensemble as well as solo numbers. Hamilton retired from regular touring in 2001.

Stars on Ice was originally conceived as an ice show for adults, without the children's cartoon characters typical of other commercial ice shows of the period such as Ice Capades or Disney on Ice. It started on a shoestring budget, playing only a few dates in small-town arenas. The first national tour was conducted in 1987–88. In 1992, IMG bought out the rival "Skating" tour from Bill Graham Presents and merged its resources with those of Stars on Ice. Among the acquisitions from the "Skating" tour was Sandra Bezic, who took over as Director and Choreographer of Stars on Ice for over a decade. For the past two years, Jeffrey Buttle has served as director. In its history, Stars on Ice has won three Emmy Awards and the 1994 ACE Cable Award for Best Sports Special.

Stars on Ice tours the United States, Canada, Japan and China on an annual basis, and has also staged shows in Europe, Brazil, and Korea. The Tour has played over 1,600 shows in its 32 seasons.

== Historical timeline ==
- October, 1986: Scott Hamilton ‘America’ Tour debuts, starting in Orono, ME and travels to Burlington, VT; Durham, NH; Morristown, NJ; and Philadelphia, PA.
- December, 1986: Stars on Ice hits the road headlining Scott Hamilton and Rosalynn Sumners. Scheduled cities were medium-size and primarily located in the East and Midwest.
- 1987-1988 Tour: Discover Card becomes the title sponsor with Plymouth as the presenting sponsor. The Tour plays 36 shows in its first full season.
- 1987: ESPN televises first show from Chicago.
- 1988-1989 Tour: 1988 Olympic Medalists Brian Orser, Debi Thomas, and Tracy Wilson & Rob McCall join the tour.
- 1989: Kitty and Peter Carruthers join the tour which further increases the versatility of the tour.
- 1990: Canada becomes part of the Stars on Ice schedule.
- September, 1991: Former Cast Member Rob McCall dies from AIDS.
- 1991-1992 Tour: The baseball number provides the impetus for the wonderful, full-cast ensemble productions that would follow.
- 1992: Two major performances televised by Turner Broadcasting and NBC. The Tour will win three Emmy Awards and one ACE Cable award for its television productions in the years to come.
- 1992: World Champion Kurt Browning becomes the first major amateur skater on the Stars on Ice Tour as he headlines the Canadian Tour.
- 1992: (April 28) Former cast member Brian James Pockar, Canadian figure skater, dies in Calgary of AIDS.
- 1992-1993: Olympic Gold Medalist Kristi Yamaguchi joins the Tour. Sandra Bezic is hired as Director/Choreographer.
- February 19, 1993: The show's first appearance at Madison Square Garden.
- 1994: Scott, Brian, Rosalynn, Kitty, and Peter lead a tribute to the ’84 Olympics in Sarajevo.
- 1994: Katarina Witt joins Stars on Ice; Kurt Browning expands his participation to the U.S. Tour.
- 1994-1995 Tour: The return of Gordeeva & Grinkov following their second Olympic Gold in Lillehammer; cast features total of six Olympic Gold Medals.
- November 20, 1995: Sergei Grinkov collapses and dies of a heart attack at SOI rehearsals.
- February 27, 1996: Stars on Ice presents Celebration of a Life, a prime time CBS special featuring the return to the ice of Ekaterina Gordeeva.
- 1996-1997 Tour: Jayne Torvill & Christopher Dean join the Tour. Ekaterina Gordeeva tours as a solo skater. Smucker’s becomes the presenting sponsor of the Tour.
- March, 1997: Scott Hamilton is diagnosed with testicular cancer.
- 1997-98 Tour: Scott Hamilton returns to the ice to perform in Stars on Ice. Stars on Ice gets a private jet that helps to relieve travel difficulties.
- 1998: Tara Lipinski and Ilia Kulik, fresh off Olympic Gold in Nagano, Japan, join the Tour. Target becomes Title Sponsor.
- 2000-01 Tour: Scott Hamilton Farewell Tour.
- 2001-02 Tour "Gold": Smucker’s becomes Title Sponsor.
- 2002: Alexei Yagudin and the Golden Pairs (Sale & Pelletier and Berezhnaya & Sikharulidze) join the cast.
- 2003-04 Tour "Time – A Theatrical Adventure"
- 2004-05 Tour "Imagination – It’s all You Need to Dream"
- 2005-06 Tour: 20th Anniversary Season.
- 2006-07 Tour "Double Exposure – The Many Lives of Figure Skaters"
- 2007-08 Tour "Live and in Color": Olympic Silver Medalist Sasha Cohen joins the Tour. Tour plays one month in Japan. 1,000th U.S.Stars on Ice performance on March 13, 2008, in Philadelphia.
- 2008-09 Tour "On the Edge – The Heart of the Champion"
- 2010 Tour "The Concert": After winning an Olympic gold medal in Vancouver, Evan Lysacek performs in 26 shows while competing in ABC's Dancing With The Stars throughout the tour. The Canadian Tour sells out multiple shows.
- 2010-11 Tour: Stars on Ice celebrates 25th Anniversary Tour in 25 U.S. markets.
- 2011-12 Tour "Love ‘n’ Life": Stars on Ice produces show for 10th anniversary of Salt Lake City Olympics featuring SLOC President and CEO, Mitt Romney.
- 2012-13 Tour: Dorothy Hamill joins to perform in Kurt Browning's final U.S. Tour. 250th Canadian performance on May 3, 2013, in Saskatoon, SK.
- 2014 Tour: Olympic Gold Medalists Meryl Davis & Charlie White headline the U.S. Tour. The Canadian cast features the Olympic silver medal-winning team, Tessa Virtue & Scott Moir, from the Sochi Olympics.
- 2014-15 Tour: 25th Anniversary Tour of Canada.
- 2016 Tour: "#E-motion" features medalists from 2016 World Championships in Boston.
- 2017 Tour: "In dreams" Canadian tour features Kurt Browning, Elvis Stojko, and Patrick Chan touring together for the first time.
- 2018 Tour: "Celebration" World Champion Nathan Chen leads U.S. tour; Canadian tour features entire Olympic Gold Medal-winning team and sells out across the country.
- 2019 Tour: "Unity" Held before the eventual cancellation of both the 2021 and 2022 tours due to the COVID-19 pandemic.
- 2022 Tour: "Journey" Features entire US Olympic team.

== Cast ==
The original cast was Scott Hamilton, Dorothy Hamill, Toller Cranston, Rosalynn Sumners, Brian Pockar, Lea Ann Miller, Bill Fauver, Lisa Carey, Chris Harrison, Judy Blumberg and Michael Seibert.

Skaters who have toured with the show include:

- Jeremy Abbott
- Miki Ando (Canada & Japan)
- Natalia Annenko & Genrich Sretenski
- Oksana Baiul
- Gary Beacom
- Elena Bechke & Denis Petrov
- Tanith Belbin & Ben Agosto
- Elena Berezhnaya & Anton Sikharulidze
- Shae-Lynn Bourne & Victor Kraatz
- Ryan Bradley
- Isabelle Brasseur & Lloyd Eisler
- Jason Brown
- Kurt Browning
- Jeffrey Buttle
- Maria Butyrskaya (Canada & Euro)
- Christina Carreira
- Kitty Carruthers & Peter Carruthers
- Patrick Chan
- Karen Chen
- Nathan Chen
- Chen Lu
- Madison Chock & Evan Bates
- Josée Chouinard (Canada)
- Sasha Cohen
- Steven Cousins
- Alissa Czisny
- Gabrielle Daleman (Canada)
- Meryl Davis & Charlie White
- Marie-France Dubreuil & Patrice Lauzon (Canada)
- Meagan Duhamel & Eric Radford (Canada)
- Jason Dungjen
- Polina Edmunds
- Todd Eldredge
- Joshua Farris
- Javier Fernández (Canada & Japan)
- Amber Glenn
- Gracie Gold
- Ekaterina Gordeeva
- Ekaterina Gordeeva & Sergei Grinkov
- Loena Hendrickx
- Christine Hough & Doug Ladret
- Madison Hubbell & Zach Donohue
- Sarah Hughes
- Lubov Iliushechkina & Dylan Moscovitch (Canada)
- Kyoko Ina & John Zimmerman
- Ellie Kam
- Sinead Kerr & John Kerr
- Alexa Knierim & Brandon Frazier
- Radka Kovaříková & René Novotný
- Anjelika Krylova & Oleg Ovsiannikov
- Ilia Kulik
- Stéphane Lambiel (Canada & Japan)
- Isabeau Levito
- Alysa Liu
- Tara Lipinski
- Evan Lysacek
- Jenni Meno & Todd Sand
- Ilia Malinin
- Kimmie Meissner
- Satoko Miyahara
- Mirai Nagasu
- Maxim Naumov
- Kimberly Navarro & Brent Bommentre
- Angela Nikodinov
- Brian Orser
- Daniel O'Shea
- Kaetlyn Osmond (Canada)
- Cynthia Phaneuf (Canada)
- Anthony Ponomarenko
- Susanna Rahkamo & Petri Kokko
- Adam Rippon
- Jennifer Robinson
- Renée Roca & Gorsha Sur
- Joannie Rochette
- Lucinda Ruh
- Yuka Sato
- Jamie Salé & David Pelletier
- Emanuel Sandhu (Canada & Euro)
- Shawn Sawyer
- Kathleen Schmelz
- Xue Shen & Hongbo Zhao
- Maia Shibutani & Alex Shibutani
- Michael Slipchuk (Canada)
- Elvis Stojko (Canada)
- Rosalynn Sumners
- Bradie Tennell
- Debi Thomas
- Andrew Torgashev
- Jayne Torvill & Christopher Dean
- Jill Trenary
- Barbara Underhill & Paul Martini (Canada)
- Tessa Virtue & Scott Moir (Canada & Japan)
- Ashley Wagner
- Kaitlyn Weaver & Andrew Poje (Canada)
- Michael Weiss
- Tracy Wilson & Rob McCall
- Katarina Witt
- Paul Wylie
- Kristi Yamaguchi
- Alexei Yagudin
- Emilea Zingas & Vadym Kolesnik

=== Stars on Ice Europe ===
- Denise Biellmann
- Ruben Blommaert
- Nicole Bobek
- Maria Butyrskaya
- Margarita Drobiazko and Povilas Vanagas
- Barbara Fusar-Poli & Maurizio Margaglio
- Romain Gazave
- Andrei Griazev
- Stefan Lindemann
- Tatiana Navka & Roman Kostomarov
- Katie Orscher & Garrett Lucash
- Isabelle Pieman
- Susanna Pöykiö
- Jozef Sabovčík
- Irina Slutskaya
- Tatiana Totmianina & Maxim Marinin
- Kevin van der Perren
- Mandy Wötzel & Ingo Steuer

=== Stars on Ice Japan ===
- Miki Ando
- Shizuka Arakawa
- Mai Asada
- Mao Asada
- Philippe Candeloro
- Jun-hwan Cha
- Patrick Chan
- Nathan Chen
- Madison Chock & Evan Bates
- Meagan Duhamel & Eric Radford
- Javier Fernández
- Piper Gilles & Paul Poirier
- Yuzuru Hanyu
- Loena Hendrickx
- Wakaba Higuchi
- Takeshi Honda
- Rika Kihira
- Carolina Kostner
- Takahiko Kozuka
- Alexa Knierim & Brandon Frazier
- Tatsuki Machida
- Ilia Malinin
- Evgenia Medvedeva
- Mai Mihara
- Riku Miura & Ryuichi Kihara
- Satoko Miyahara
- Takahito Mura
- Daisuke Murakami
- Kanako Murakami
- Kana Muramoto & Chris Reed
- Yukari Nakano
- Nobunari Oda
- Kaetlyn Osmond
- Qing Pang & Jian Tong
- Evgeni Plushenko
- Cathy Reed & Chris Reed
- Kaori Sakamoto
- Maia Shibutani & Alex Shibutani
- Koshiro Shimada
- Mao Shimada
- Irina Slutskaya
- Adelina Sotnikova
- Miu Suzaki & Ryuichi Kihara
- Akiko Suzuki
- Daisuke Takahashi
- Narumi Takahashi & Mervin Tran
- Narumi Takahashi & Ryuichi Kihara
- Shoma Uno
- Tessa Virtue & Scott Moir
- Young You
- Johnny Weir
- Alina Zagitova

== Other ice shows named Stars on Ice ==
- Stars on Ice was also the name of an ice show put on at the Center Theatre in New York City in the early 1940s. The show was produced by Arthur Wirtz and Sonja Henie. The original Broadway production ran for 827 performances.
- Stars on Ice was also a television series, broadcast from 1976 to 1981 on the CTV Television Network in Canada, hosted by Alex Trebek (1976–1980) and later, Doug Crosley (1980–1981).
