= Stars on Ice (disambiguation) =

Stars on Ice is an ongoing touring figure-skating show.

Stars on Ice may also refer to:

- Stars on Ice (Canadian TV series), a 1976–1981 figure-skating show
- Stars on Ice (Philippine TV series), a 2007 ice-dancing competition show

== See also ==
- Dancing on Ice, a British figure-skating competition reality TV franchise developed as Stars on Thin Ice
