= 2006 U.S. Figure Skating Championships =

Figure skating competition

- Type: National Championship
- Date: January 7 – 15
- Season: 2005–06
- Location: St. Louis, Missouri
- Venue: Savvis Center

Champions
- Men's singles: Johnny Weir
- Ladies' singles: Sasha Cohen
- Pairs: Rena Inoue / John Baldwin
- Ice dance: Tanith Belbin / Benjamin Agosto
- Previous: 2005 U.S. Championships
- Next: 2007 U.S. Championships

The 2006 U.S. Figure Skating Championships took place between January 7 and 15, 2006 at the Savvis Center in St. Louis, Missouri. Skaters competed in four disciplines – men's singles, ladies' singles, pair skating, and ice dancing – across three levels: senior, junior, and novice. Medals were awarded in four colors: gold (first), silver (second), bronze (third), and pewter (fourth).

The event was used to determine the U.S. teams for the 2006 Winter Olympics, the 2006 World Championships, the 2006 Four Continents Championships, and the 2006 World Junior Championships.

== Competition notes ==
- This was the first time the ISU Judging System was used at the U.S. Championships.
- Novice ice dancing teams Madison Hubbell / Keiffer Hubbell and Cathy Reed / Chris Reed tied in the first novice compulsory dance. The tie was broken by the technical elements score and so the Hubbells won that segment of the competition.
- Junior men's silver medalist Jonathan Trinh was not placed on the World Junior Championships team because he was not age-eligible.

== Senior results ==
=== Men ===
Rank	Name	Total points	SP		FS	
1	Johnny Weir	225.34	1	83.28	3	142.06
2	Evan Lysacek	224.47	3	74.03	1	150.44
3	Matthew Savoie	222.36	4	72.50	2	149.86
4	Michael Weiss	217.48	2	77.55	5	139.93
5	Scott Smith	208.03	8	66.25	4	141.78
6	Ryan Jahnke	207.26	7	67.39	6	139.87
7	Timothy Goebel	201.61	5	70.27	8	131.34
8	Ryan Bradley	199.50	6	69.33	9	130.17
9	Parker Pennington	197.03	10	64.86	7	132.17
10	Michael Villarreal	167.77	12	56.58	10	111.19
11	Nicholas LaRoche	163.82	11	57.68	15	106.14
12	Derrick Delmore	163.33	13	54.58	12	108.75
13	Tommy Steenberg	161.40	17	51.62	11	109.78
14	Jordan Wilson	160.37	16	52.27	13	108.10
15	Shaun Rogers	159.67	15	53.18	14	106.49
16	Dennis Phan	155.31	14	54.03	16	101.28
17	Rohene Ward	154.63	9	66.11	17	88.52

=== Ladies ===
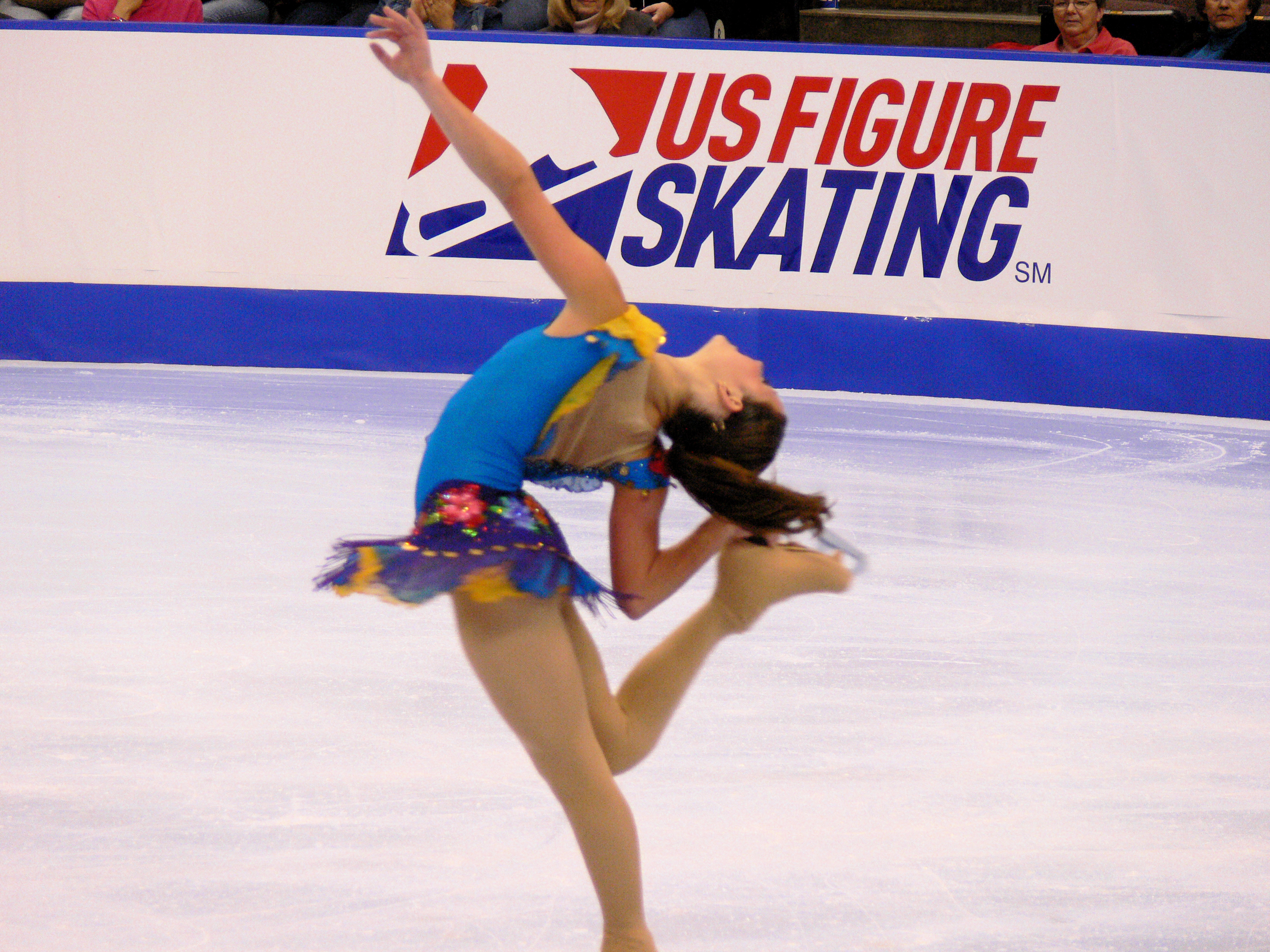
Sasha Cohen performing a combination spin during her short program

Rank	Name	Total points	SP		FS	
1	Sasha Cohen	199.18	1	65.15	1	134.03
2	Kimmie Meissner	171.04	4	55.03	2	116.01
3	Emily Hughes	165.72	2	59.11	3	106.61
4	Katy Taylor	152.54	7	48.69	4	103.85
5	Beatrisa Liang	151.41	3	58.82	8	92.59
6	Christine Zukowski	151.23	6	51.01	5	100.22
7	Alissa Czisny	149.51	5	54.51	7	95.00
8	Stephanie Rosenthal	147.13	8	47.40	6	99.73
9	Amber Corwin	137.64	9	45.12	9	92.52
10	Megan Williams-Stewart	129.44	10	44.44	12	85.00
11	Erica Archambault	128.02	13	40.73	11	87.29
12	Danielle Kahle	126.10	15	38.74	10	87.36
13	Jane Bugaeva	121.78	12	41.08	13	80.70
14	Megan Oster	119.39	11	41.33	14	78.06
15	Michelle Boulos	106.87	16	38.52	15	68.35
16	Abigail Legg	100.31	17	38.38	16	61.93
17	Anna Madorsky	91.83	18	35.88	17	55.95
18	Stephanie Roth	79.13	19	25.76	18	53.37
WD	Amy Evidente		14	40.65		

=== Pairs ===
Rank	Name	Total points	SP		FS	
1	Rena Inoue / John Baldwin	181.05	4	55.48	1	125.57
2	Marcy Hinzmann / Aaron Parchem	165.82	2	57.41	2	108.41
3	Kathryn Orscher / Garrett Lucash	165.16	1	60.65	4	104.51
4	Tiffany Scott / Rusty Fein	158.39	6	51.42	3	106.97
5	Naomi Nari Nam / Themistocles Leftheris	157.32	3	56.63	5	100.69
6	Tiffany Vise / Derek Trent	153.78	5	54.71	7	99.07
7	Amanda Evora / Mark Ladwig	147.52	9	48.06	6	99.46
8	Brooke Castile / Benjamin Okolski	139.34	8	48.47	8	90.87
9	Brittany Vise / Nicholas Kole	136.38	7	49.31	11	87.07
10	Chloé Katz / Joseph Lynch	133.97	11	44.68	9	89.29
11	Shantel Jordan / Jeremy Barrett	131.06	15	41.77	10	89.29
12	Colette Appel / Lee Harris	128.14	13	44.17	12	83.97
13	Stephanie Kuban / Laureano Ibarra	126.40	14	42.85	13	83.55
14	Marisa Sharma / Amir Ganaba	123.15	10	47.56	15	75.59
15	Yuko Kawaguchi / Devin Patrick	122.80	12	44.66	14	78.14
16	Janice Mayne / Ethan Burgess	110.25	16	39.66	16	70.59
17	Katie Uhlig / Michael Modro	99.53	17	36.37	17	63.16
18	Willie Traeger / Kostya Emshanov	85.11	18	31.62	18	53.49

=== Ice dancing ===
Rank	Name	Total points	CD		OD		FD	
1	Tanith Belbin / Benjamin Agosto	215.29	1	41.48	1	66.32	1	107.49
2	Melissa Gregory / Denis Petukhov	185.26	2	35.69	2	58.44	3	91.13
3	Jamie Silverstein / Ryan O'Meara	178.46	4	32.24	3	54.46	2	91.76
4	Morgan Matthews / Maxim Zavozin	174.53	3	33.98	4	52.81	6	87.74
5	Kimberly Navarro / Brent Bommentre	173.76	5	31.69	6	51.44	4	90.63
6	Tiffany Stiegler / Sergey Magerovskiy	170.99	7	30.84	5	51.72	5	88.43
7	Jennifer Wester / Daniil Barantsev	161.89	9	28.85	7	50.80	8	82.24
8	Trina Pratt / Todd Gilles	159.66	8	29.09	9	47.89	7	82.68
9	Loren Galler-Rabinowitz / David Mitchell	157.05	6	31.07	8	49.57	9	76.41
10	Meghan McCullough / Joel Dear	135.08	11	26.34	10	43.51	12	65.23
11	Caitlin Mallory / Brent Holdburg	133.59	13	23.14	13	36.09	10	74.36
12	Charlotte Maxwell / Nick Traxler	131.56	12	24.31	11	41.54	11	65.71
13	Stephanie Ellis / Ian Ross Frye	114.90	14	22.13	15	32.93	13	59.84
14	Lindsay Evans / Kevin O'Keefe	113.12	15	21.14	14	35.70	14	56.28
15	Elizabeth Palmer / Jonathan Toman	79.63	16	15.27	16	26.67	15	37.69
WD	Kate Slattery / Chuen-Gun Lee		10	26.62	12	38.42		

== Junior results ==
=== Men ===
Rank	Name	Total points	SP		FS	
1	Stephen Carriere	180.28	2	53.40	1	126.88
2	Jonathan Trinh	179.56	3	52.67	2	114.89
3	Geoffry Varner	165.49	1	57.58	3	107.91
4	Daisuke Murakami	153.97	10	48.59	4	105.38
5	Craig Ratterree	152.30	4	52.07	5	100.23
6	Casey McCraw	147.98	6	51.09	6	96.89
7	Princeton Kwong	144.11	9	49.14	8	94.97
8	Jonathan Cassar	141.05	7	49.55	10	91.50
9	Charlie White	139.67	12	43.76	7	95.91
10	Traighe Rouse	138.34	13	43.75	9	94.59
11	Adam Rippon	134.19	8	49.54	12	84.65
12	Douglas Razzano	129.75	11	44.20	11	85.55
13	Austin Kanallakan	126.73	5	51.93	14	74.80
14	William Brewster	113.14	14	40.11	15	73.03
15	Peter Lindstrom	109.05	15	31.05	13	78.00

=== Ladies ===
Rank	Name	Total points	SP		FS	
1	Megan Hyatt	139.96	4	44.21	1	95.75
2	Rachael Flatt	137.45	1	53.58	5	83.87
3	Melissa Bulanhagui	135.47	3	45.49	3	89.98
4	Ashley Wagner	132.45	2	45.85	4	86.60
5	Juliana Cannarozzo	131.34	10	39.93	2	91.41
6	Molly Oberstar	127.66	5	44.19	6	83.47
7	Katrina Hacker	122.78	6	43.35	8	79.43
8	Caroline Zhang	122.19	7	41.69	7	80.50
9	Becky Hughes	114.80	11	38.57	9	76.23
10	Tenile Victorsen	107.64	9	40.93	10	66.71
11	Jessica Houston	105.71	8	41.38	11	64.33
12	Caroline Miller	91.76	12	31.22	12	60.54

=== Pairs ===
Rank	Name	Total points	SP		FS	
1	Kendra Moyle / Andy Seitz	147.81	2	49.89	1	97.92
2	Bridget Namiotka / John Coughlin	138.92	5	46.45	2	92.47
3	Julia Vlassov / Drew Meekins	138.85	3	49.86	3	88.99
4	Kaela Pflumm / Christopher Pottenger	136.34	4	47.91	4	88.43
5	Bianca Butler / Joseph Jacobsen	132.97	1	49.92	7	83.05
6	Rhea Sy / Cole Davis	129.46	7	45.28	5	84.18
7	Aaryn Smith / Will Chitwood	129.04	6	45.35	6	83.69
8	Katie Boxwell / Danny Curzon	118.86	9	41.18	9	77.68
9	Claire Davis / Nathan Miller	118.48	8	43.30	11	75.18
10	Lilly Pixley / John Salway	115.89	12	37.29	8	78.60
11	Lisa Moore / Justin Gaumond	113.10	13	36.90	10	76.20
12	Arielle Trujillo / Grant Marron	110.72	10	40.01	12	70.71
13	Lindsey Seitz / R.J. Westfall	110.14	11	39.89	13	70.25
14	Noelle Chiavetta / Chad Brennan	93.80	15	32.98	14	60.82
15	Meeran Trombley / Nathaniel Hess	90.24	14	36.73	15	53.51

=== Ice dancing ===
Rank	Name	Total points	CD1		CD2		OD		FD	
1	Meryl Davis / Charlie White	178.86	1	17.21	1	18.14	1	58.06	1	85.45
2	Emily Samuelson / Evan Bates	160.24	2	15.91	2	17.03	2	51.07	2	76.23
3	Jane Summersett / Elliot Pennington	145.02	3	15.18	3	16.82	3	48.14	4	64.88
4	Kaitlyn Weaver / Charles Clavey	139.83	4	14.08	4	15.21	6	42.16	3	68.38
5	Kimmerly Lauten / Augie Hill	135.91	5	13.96	5	14.99	5	43.43	5	63.53
6	Elizabeth Miosi / Dmitry Ponomarev	134.05	7	12.55	6	14.57	4	43.78	6	63.15
7	Pilar Bosley / John Corona	127.76	6	13.49	7	14.51	7	41.28	10	58.48
8	Blake Rosenthal / Calvin Taylor	125.04	11	11.11	10	13.33	8	39.35	7	61.25
9	Katrina Reyes / Jon Wright	122.42	8	12.53	9	13.37	11	37.12	8	59.40
10	Mauri Gustafson / Logan Giulietti-Schmitt	121.55	12	10.99	8	13.70	9	37.62	9	59.24
11	Brooke Huber / Karl Edelmann	116.98	13	10.84	13	11.10	10	37.45	11	57.59
12	Clare Farrell / Ashley Deavers	113.20	9	11.72	12	12.34	12	36.73	12	52.41
13	Isabel Elliman / Dmitriy Serebrenik	108.09	10	11.46	11	12.51	13	32.65	13	51.47

== International team selections ==
=== Winter Olympic ===
	Men	Ladies	Pairs	Ice dancing
1	Johnny Weir	Sasha Cohen	Rena Inoue / John Baldwin	Tanith Belbin / Ben Agosto
2	Evan Lysacek	Kimmie Meissner	Marcy Hinzmann / Aaron Parchem	Melissa Gregory / Denis Petukhov
3	Matthew Savoie	Michelle Kwan		Jamie Silverstein / Ryan O'Meara
1st alternate	Michael Weiss	Emily Hughes	Katie Orscher / Garrett Lucash	Morgan Matthews / Max Zavozin
2nd alternate	Scott Smith	Katy Taylor	Tiffany Scott / Rusty Fein	Kimberly Navarro / Brent Bommentre

=== World Championships ===
	Men	Ladies	Pairs	Ice dancing
1	Johnny Weir	Sasha Cohen	Rena Inoue / John Baldwin	Tanith Belbin / Ben Agosto
2	Evan Lysacek	Kimmie Meissner	Marcy Hinzmann / Aaron Parchem	Melissa Gregory / Denis Petukhov
3	Matthew Savoie	Emily Hughes		Jamie Silverstein / Ryan O'Meara
1st alternate	Michael Weiss	Katy Taylor	Katie Orscher / Garrett Lucash	Morgan Matthews / Max Zavozin
2nd alternate	Scott Smith	Bebe Liang	Tiffany Scott / Rusty Fein	Kimberly Navarro / Brent Bommentre

=== Four Continents Championships ===
	Men	Ladies	Pairs	Ice dancing
1	Matthew Savoie	Katy Taylor	Rena Inoue / John Baldwin	Tanith Belbin / Ben Agosto
2	Michael Weiss	Bebe Liang	Marcy Hinzmann / Aaron Parchem	Melissa Gregory / Denis Petukhov
3	Scott Smith	Christine Zukowski	Katie Orscher / Garrett Lucash	Jamie Silverstein / Ryan O'Meara
1st alternate	Ryan Jahnke	Alissa Czisny	Tiffany Scott / Rusty Fein	Morgan Matthews / Max Zavozin
2nd alternate			Naomi Nari Nam / Themistocles Leftheris	Kimberly Navarro / Brent Bommentre

=== World Junior Championships ===
	Men	Ladies	Pairs	Ice dancing
1	Stephen Carriere	Alissa Czisny	Kendra Moyle / Andy Seitz	Meryl Davis / Charlie White
2	Daisuke Murakami	Katy Taylor	Bridget Namiotka / John Coughlin	Trina Pratt / Todd Gilles
3	Geoffry Varner	Christine Zukowski	Julia Vlassov / Drew Meekins	Emily Samuelson / Evan Bates
1st alternate	Tommy Steenberg	Megan Hyatt	Kaela Pflumm / Christopher Pottenger	Jane Summersett / Elliot Pennington
2nd alternate	Craig Ratterree	Stephanie Rosenthal	Bianca Butler / Joseph Jacobsen	Kaitlyn Weaver / Charles Clavey
