= Lydia Manon =

American ice dancer

Personal information
- Born: September 16, 1982 (age 43)

Figure skating career
- Country: United States
- Skating club: Arctic Edge FSC
- Retired: 2006
Medal record
Figure skating
Ice dancing
Representing the United States
Four Continents Championships
Bronze medal – third place	2005 Gangneung	Ice dancing

Lydia Manon (born September 16, 1982, in Reading, PA) is an American retired ice dancer. With Ryan O'Meara, she is the 2005 U.S. bronze medalist and Four Continents bronze medalist. They announced the end of their partnership in March 2005.

Manon began skating with Brandon Forsyth in March 2005. They skated together until mid-2006 when she retired to pursue academic studies at the George Washington University. Prior to joining forces with O'Meara in 2003, she competed with Michel Klus.

Currently, Manon is a graduate student in the Slavic Department at the University of Virginia.

== Competitive highlights ==
(with O'Meara)

Event	2003–04	2004–05
Four Continents Championships		3rd
U.S. Championships	6th	3rd
Nebelhorn Trophy	6th	1st

(with Shalin)

Event	2002–03
U.S. Championships	10th

(with Klus)

Event	2000–01
World Junior Championships	14th
U.S. Championships	1st J.
Junior Grand Prix, Poland	5th
Junior Grand Prix, Ukraine	4th
J. = Junior level

(with Obzansky)

Event	1999–2000
U.S. Championships	6th J.
J. = Junior level

== Programs ==
(with O'Meara)

Season	Original dance	Free dance
2004–2005	You Can't Take that Away From Me; 42nd Street musical	Black Cat, White Cat (soundtrack) by Goran Bregovic
