= Brandon Forsyth =

American former competitive ice dancer

Personal information
- Born: November 8, 1979 (age 46) Concord, Massachusetts, U.S.
- Height: 5 ft 10 in (1.77 m)

Figure skating career
- Country: United States
- Skating club: Skating Club of Boston
- Began skating: 1983
- Retired: 2005

Brandon Forsyth (born November 8, 1979) is an American former competitive ice dancer. With Emilie Nussear, he is the 2000 World Junior silver medalist. They were coached by Bob Young in Simsbury, Connecticut. In the summer of 2000, Forsyth teamed up with Jessica Joseph. They became the 2001 U.S. national bronze medalists and alternates to the 2002 Winter Olympics. They were coached by Alexander Zhulin and Samvel Gezalian in Hackensack, New Jersey. Forsyth formed a partnership with Lydia Manon in March 2005.

== Programs ==
(with Joseph)

Season	Original dance	Free dance
2001–02	Nyah (from Mission: Impossible II) by Hans Zimmer; Have You Ever Really Loved a Woman? (from Don Juan DeMarco) by Bryan Adams; Nyah by Hans Zimmer	Deep Forest; Marta's Song; Bohemian Ballet by Deep Forest
2000–01	This Business of Love (from The Mask); Girls, Girls, Girls	Chicago by C. Rodriguez

== Competitive highlights ==
GP: Grand Prix; JGP: Junior Grand Prix

=== With O'Donnell ===
International
Event	1995–96	1996–97
World Junior Champ.		8th
National
U.S. Championships	5th J.	2nd J.
J. = Junior level

=== With Nussear ===
International
Event	1998–1999	1999–2000
World Junior Champ.	15th	2nd
JGP Final		2nd
JGP Bulgaria	3rd	
JGP Hungary	3rd	
JGP Netherlands		2nd
JGP Norway		1st
National
U.S. Championships	2nd J.	2nd J.
J. = Junior level

=== With Joseph ===
International
Event	2000–01	2001–02
Four Continents Champ.	5th	
GP NHK Trophy		8th
GP Skate America		8th
National
U.S. Championships	3rd	5th
