= Sasha Cohen =

American figure skater (born 1984)

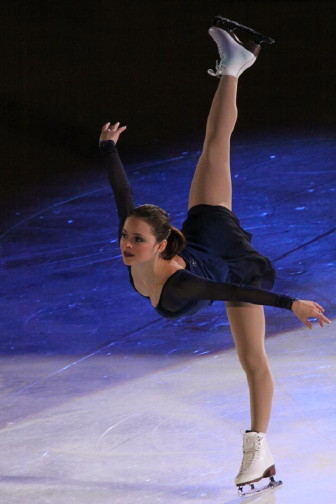
- Cohen skating in 2009

Personal information
- Full name: Alexandra Pauline Cohen
- Born: October 26, 1984 (age 42) Westwood, California, U.S.
- Home town: Newport Beach, California, U.S.
- Height: 5 ft 2 in (1.58 m)

Figure skating career
- Country: United States
- Discipline: Women's singles
- Began skating: 1992
- Retired: 2010
Event	Gold medal – first place	Silver medal – second place	Bronze medal – third place
Olympic Games	0	1	0
World Championships	0	2	1
Grand Prix Final	1	1	0
U.S. Championships	1	4	1
Medal list
Olympic Games
Silver medal – second place	2006 Turin	Singles
World Championships
Silver medal – second place	2004 Dortmund	Singles
Silver medal – second place	2005 Moscow	Singles
Bronze medal – third place	2006 Calgary	Singles
Grand Prix Final
Gold medal – first place	2002–03 Saint Petersburg	Singles
Silver medal – second place	2003–04 Colorado Springs	Singles
U.S. Championships
Gold medal – first place	2006 St. Louis	Singles
Silver medal – second place	2000 Cleveland	Singles
Silver medal – second place	2002 Los Angeles	Singles
Silver medal – second place	2004 Atlanta	Singles
Silver medal – second place	2005 Portland	Singles
Bronze medal – third place	2003 Dallas	Singles

Alexandra Pauline "Sasha" Cohen (born October 26, 1984) is an American retired figure skater. She is the 2006 Olympic silver medalist, a three-time World Championship medalist, the 2003 Grand Prix Final Champion, and the 2006 U.S. Champion. She is known for her artistry, flexibility and body lines, and musical interpretation.

== Early life ==
Cohen was born in Westwood, Los Angeles, a neighborhood in California. Her nickname "Sasha" is a Russian diminutive of "Alexandra". Her mother, Galina Cohen (née Feldman), is a Jewish immigrant from Odesa, Ukrainian SSR, Soviet Union, and a former ballet dancer. Her father, Roger Cohen, is a graduate of the UC Berkeley School of Law and formerly a law partner at Brobeck, Phleger & Harrison.

Cohen graduated from Futures High School in Mission Viejo, California, in 2002. Cohen graduated from Columbia University in 2016 with a degree in political science. As a university student, she has used the name Alex rather than Sasha.

In 2005, Cohen published her autobiography, Fire on Ice. The autobiography was republished in 2006 with a new chapter on the 2006 season.

== Skating career ==
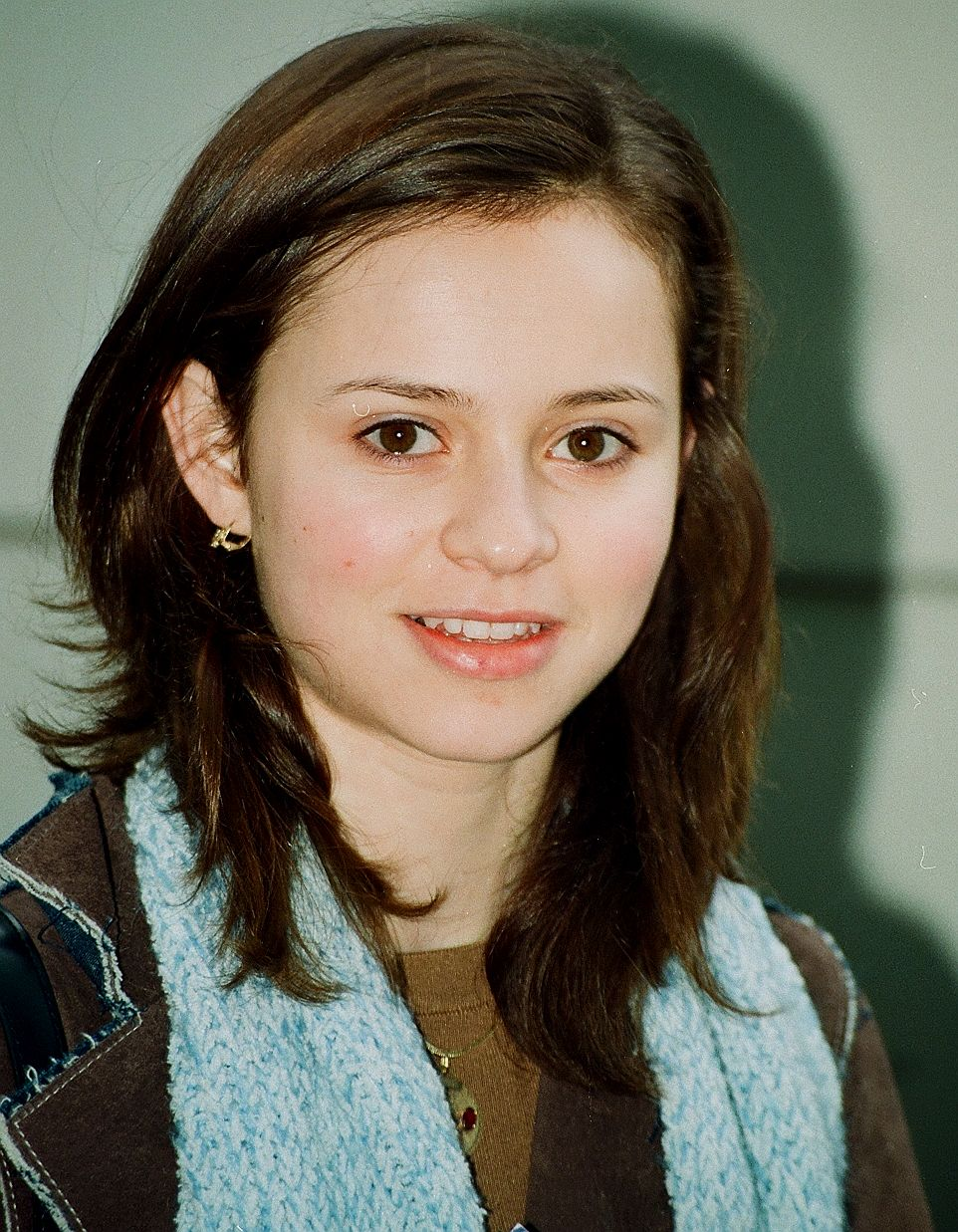
Cohen as a pre-teen skater in Baltimore in 1996

=== Early career ===
A gymnast from an early age, Cohen switched to figure skating when she was seven years old, but it wasn't until she was eleven that she began to take the sport seriously. One of her early skating coaches was Victor Yelchin, father of late actor Anton Yelchin.

Cohen rose to prominence in the skating community during the 2000 U.S. Championships. Just up from juniors, Cohen was first in the short program and finished second overall after the free skate, provisionally qualifying for the senior World team. A loophole in the ISU's age rules at the time would have allowed her to compete at the senior World Championships if she medaled at the World Junior Championships but she finished 6th at the junior event.

=== Senior development ===
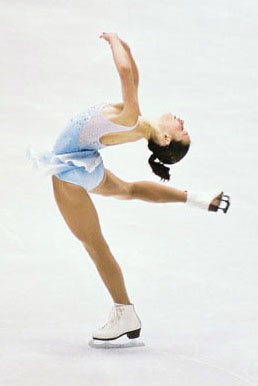
Cohen performing a layback spin at the 2002 Winter Olympics

Cohen did not compete at the 2001 U.S. Nationals due to a stress fracture in her back. She resumed full training in June 2001. Cohen won the silver medal at the 2002 U.S. Championships, earning her a trip to the Olympics. Cohen competed at the 2002 Winter Olympics in Salt Lake City, Utah, finishing 4th. She also finished 4th at the 2002 World Championships, held in Nagano. Cohen was coached by John Nicks in California.

In the summer of 2002, Cohen moved to the East Coast to train with Tatiana Tarasova at the International Skating Center of Connecticut in Simsbury, Connecticut. She won her first ISU Grand Prix event at the 2002 Skate Canada and then won the 2002 Trophée Lalique. She won the silver medal at the 2002 Cup of Russia. These three placements earned her a spot to the 2002–03 Grand Prix Final, where she became the champion. At the 2003 U.S. championships she won the bronze medal, and at the 2003 World Championships, held in Washington, D.C., Cohen placed 4th, repeating her placement in the previous season.

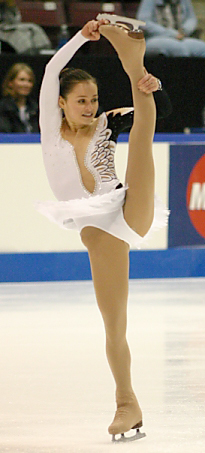
Cohen performs an I-spin at the 2003 Skate Canada competition in Mississauga, Ontario, Canada.

Her best season was 2003–04, when she took gold at the 2003 Skate America, at the 2003 Skate Canada (setting a world record in the short program) and at the 2003 Trophée Lalique and won silver at the 2003–04 Grand Prix Final. In late December 2003, she changed coaches and began training with Robin Wagner in Hackensack, New Jersey. She placed second at both the 2004 U.S. Championships and the 2004 World Championships, getting a medal at Worlds for the first time in her career.

In the 2004–05 season, Cohen withdrew from her Grand Prix events due to a recurring back injury. In late December 2004, Cohen decided to return to California and train again with her first coach John Nicks. She placed 2nd at the 2005 U.S. Championships in Portland and the 2005 World Championships in Moscow, Russia.

=== 2006 Olympic season ===
Cohen started her Olympic season by placing first at the Campbell's International Figure Skating Challenge. Soon after she withdrew from Skate America due to a hip injury. She took second place at Trophée Eric Bompard, where she fell on a triple salchow during her free skate. In 2006, Cohen captured her first U.S. Championship. With this victory Cohen automatically secured her place on the U.S. Olympic team for the 2006 Winter Olympics, a spot made official on January 14 of that year by the United States Figure Skating Association.

At the 2006 Winter Olympics in Turin, Cohen was in first after the short program, leading Russia's Irina Slutskaya by a mere .03 points. In the final free skate, Cohen fell on her first jump, a triple lutz, and had her hands down on her second jump, the triple flip. She completed the rest of her elements, including five triples. Cohen finished with an Olympic silver medal, 7.98 points behind gold medalist Shizuka Arakawa of Japan.

A month later at the 2006 World Championships in Calgary, Canada, Cohen was in first place after the short program. Completing only one jump combination and falling on the triple salchow, she placed fourth in the free skate and won the bronze medal, finishing almost ten points behind her teammate, gold medalist Kimmie Meissner.

=== Champions on Ice and hiatus ===
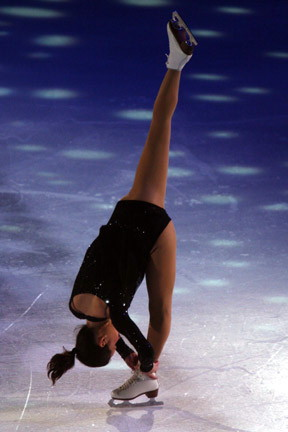
Cohen performs a Charlotte spiral at the 2008 Stars on Ice tour stop in Portland, Oregon.

In April 2006, Cohen started the Champions on Ice tour, participated in the second annual "Skating with the Stars, Under the Stars" gala in Central Park and performed in the Marshalls U.S. Figure Skating International Showcase. On April 15, 2006, Cohen announced that she intended to compete in the 2010 season and the 2010 Winter Olympics in Vancouver. She said via her official website, "I will decide after the COI Tour how much skating and what events I will do next season."

In December 2006, Cohen announced that she needed "a little downtime from competing" and that she would not defend her U.S. Figure Skating Championship title in 2007. She said that her "major goals" were the 2009 World Championships and the 2010 Olympics; "I know I want to be in Vancouver for the 2010 Olympics."

Cohen did not compete in 2007, 2008, or 2009, although she did not give up her Olympic eligibility. She performed in exhibitions, including the Rockefeller Christmas Tree lighting and USFSA-approved events. She was a headliner in the 2007–08 and 2008–09 Stars on Ice tour.

=== Return to competition ===
Cohen announced on May 6, 2009, that she planned to make a comeback for the 2010 Winter Olympics. She said she would train with Rafael Arutyunyan. Cohen received invitations to compete in the 2009 Trophée Eric Bompard and in the 2009 Skate America in the 2009–10 Grand Prix series but withdrew from both due to tendinitis in her right calf. In November 2009, she changed coaches to John Nicks, who worked closer to where she lived.

On January 21, 2010, Cohen competed for the first time in four years at the 2010 U.S. Championships in Spokane, Washington. She debuted her program to España cañí, and skated a strong performance landing a triple lutz-double toe, a triple flip, a double Axel, along with her signature spiral sequence and spins earning 69.63 points putting her in second place, just 0.43 from first-place finisher Mirai Nagasu. In her free skate, set to Moonlight Sonata, she fell on a triple flip and had two-footed landings on a number of other jumps. She finished fourth in the championships, behind Rachael Flatt, Mirai Nagasu and Ashley Wagner, and was not selected for the Olympic team, rather appointed as second alternate to the 2010 U.S. Olympic team and the 2010 World Championship team. She retired from figure skating in 2010.

== Halls of Fame ==
In 2015, Cohen was inducted into the Southern California Jewish Sports Hall of Fame. The next January 22, U.S. Figure Skating made her part of the U.S. Figure Skating Hall of Fame Class of 2016.

== Skating trademarks ==
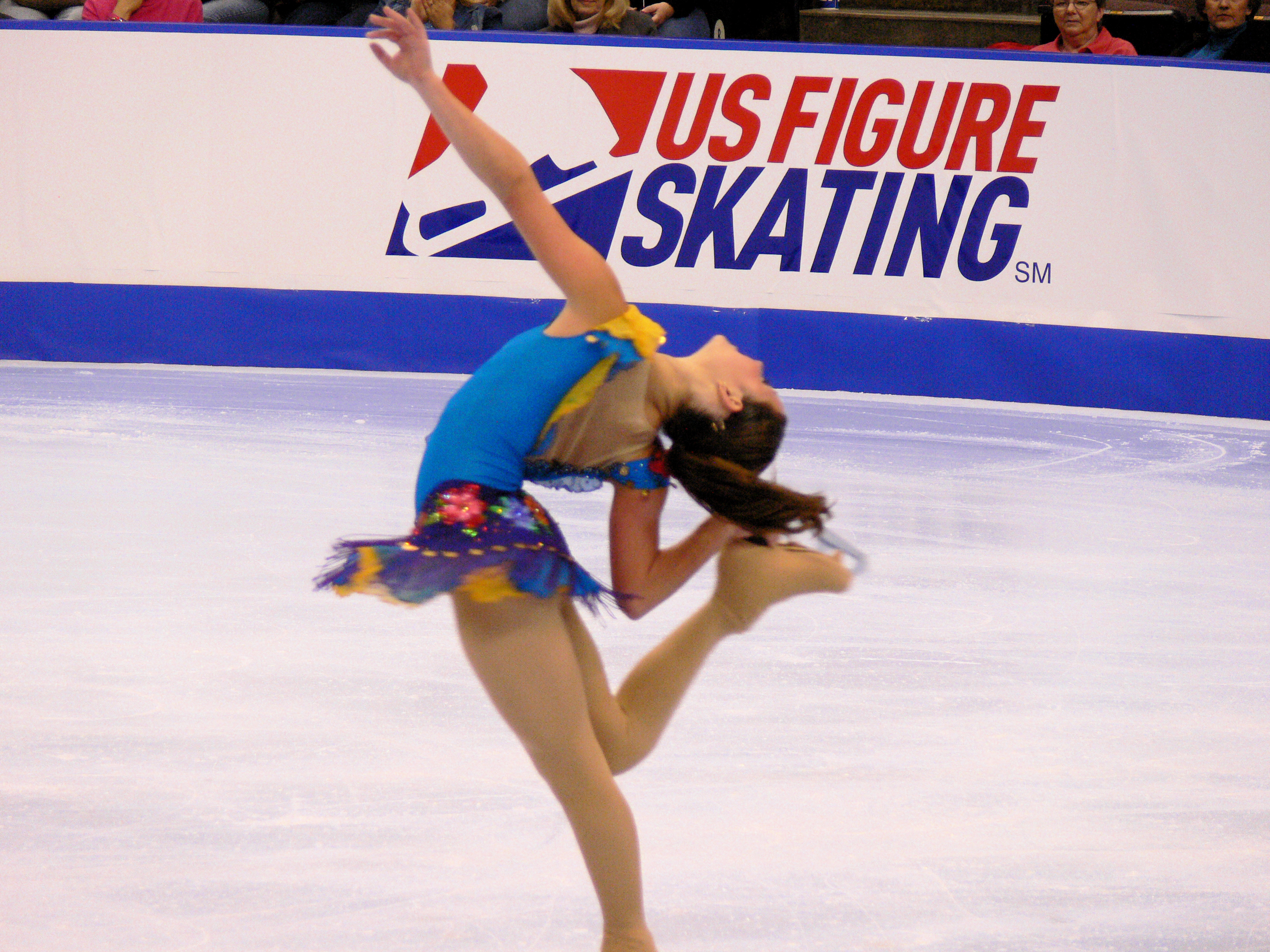
Cohen performs a combination spin at the 2006 U.S. Nationals in St. Louis, Missouri.

Cohen is the first skater to receive +3s for spirals under the International Skating Union Judging System (IJS) for "Grade of Execution (GOE)", and was also the first female skater to break the +130 barrier on a free skate under the IJS. According to figure skating historian James R. Hines, Cohen's "potential as a talented, artistic, and extremely flexible skater was never completely realized owing to her inability to present two clean programs in the same competition, especially in world and Olympic competition".

== Ice shows ==
Cohen has participated in the ice show Stars On Ice for several years, as well as starring in the 2010 Art On Ice alongside Stéphane Lambiel. She joined 2010 Olympic ladies champion Yuna Kim in the All That Skate ice show, scheduled for July 23–25, 2010 in Goyang, South Korea, alongside other skaters including Michelle Kwan, Stéphane Lambiel and Brian Joubert.

== Television and film ==
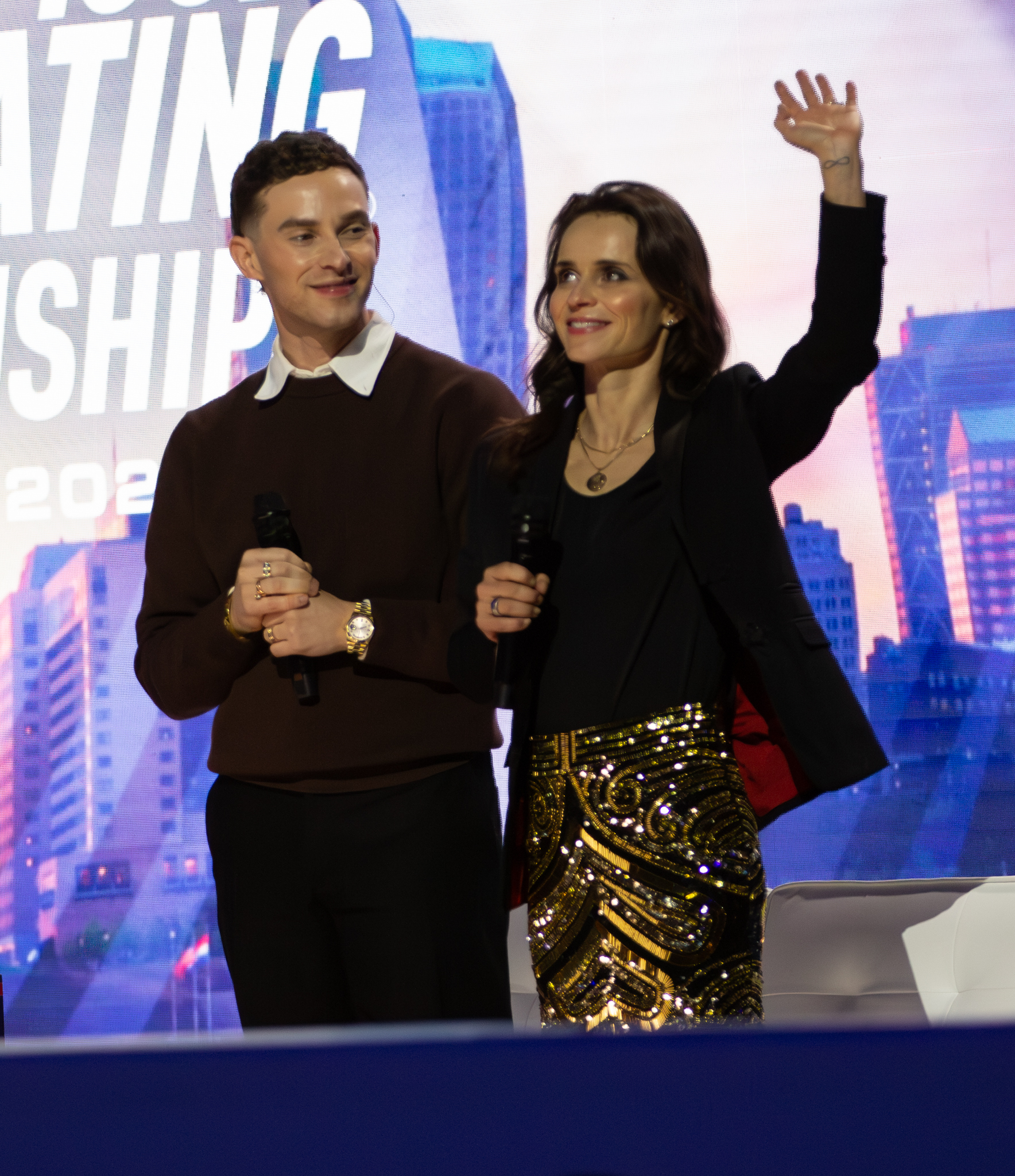
Cohen in attendance at the 2026 U.S. Championships with Adam Rippon

Cohen has appeared, as herself and as an actress playing a role, in commercials, television episodes, documentaries and feature films.

=== Television ===
Cohen has done commercials for Citizen Watch, Simply Saline, and Got Milk?. She appeared in Episode 7 of the second season of Project Runway wherein designers were challenged to design a skating dress for her. The winning dress (by Zulema Griffin) did not fit and the dress had to be resized. Cohen made a brief appearance guest starring as herself on the May 5, 2006, episode of the NBC drama, Las Vegas. In April 2008, she appeared as a contortionist on the premiere episode of Secret Talents of the Stars and advanced to the semifinals, although the show was cancelled before she could perform again. She made a guest appearance as an ice skater in CSI: NY season 3 episode 12 "Silent Night". Cohen also participated in the 2013 edition of "Tornado Week" on The Weather Channel, helping break the myth that small tornadoes are not as destructive by demonstrating a tight spin.

=== Film ===
Cohen played Fiona Hughes, Moondance Alexander's archenemy, in the Don Johnson movie Moondance Alexander. At the 2006 Academy Awards, Cohen served as a guest correspondent for Inside Edition. This experience led to an encounter with Ben Stiller and a discussion about having a part in a future comedy about figure skating, which Cohen said she would enjoy. In 2007, she appeared as herself in Blades of Glory. Later that year, she also had a role in Bratz: The Movie. In 2017, Cohen appeared as herself in the Syfy TV movie, Sharknado 5.

Cohen was featured in The Weight of Gold (2020), an HBO Sports Documentary which "explor(es) the mental health challenges that Olympic athletes often face."

== Personal life ==
On July 5, 2015, it was announced that Cohen was engaged to hedge fund manager Tom May. On August 20, 2016, the couple married in Cape Cod, Massachusetts. In February 2018, she and May were living apart and going through divorce proceedings. Cohen now works as an associate at Morgan Stanley. In October 2019, Cohen announced her engagement to Geoffrey Lieberthal, an equity partner who is also the son of political scientist Kenneth Lieberthal. They have two children: a son born in January 2020 and a daughter born in August 2021. Cohen and Lieberthal married in September 2022 in Aspen Mountain, Colorado.

== Programs ==
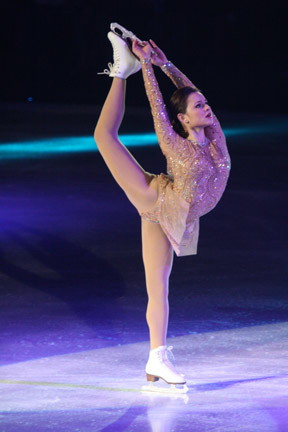
Cohen performs a Biellmann spiral on the 2008 Stars on Ice tour stop in Halifax.

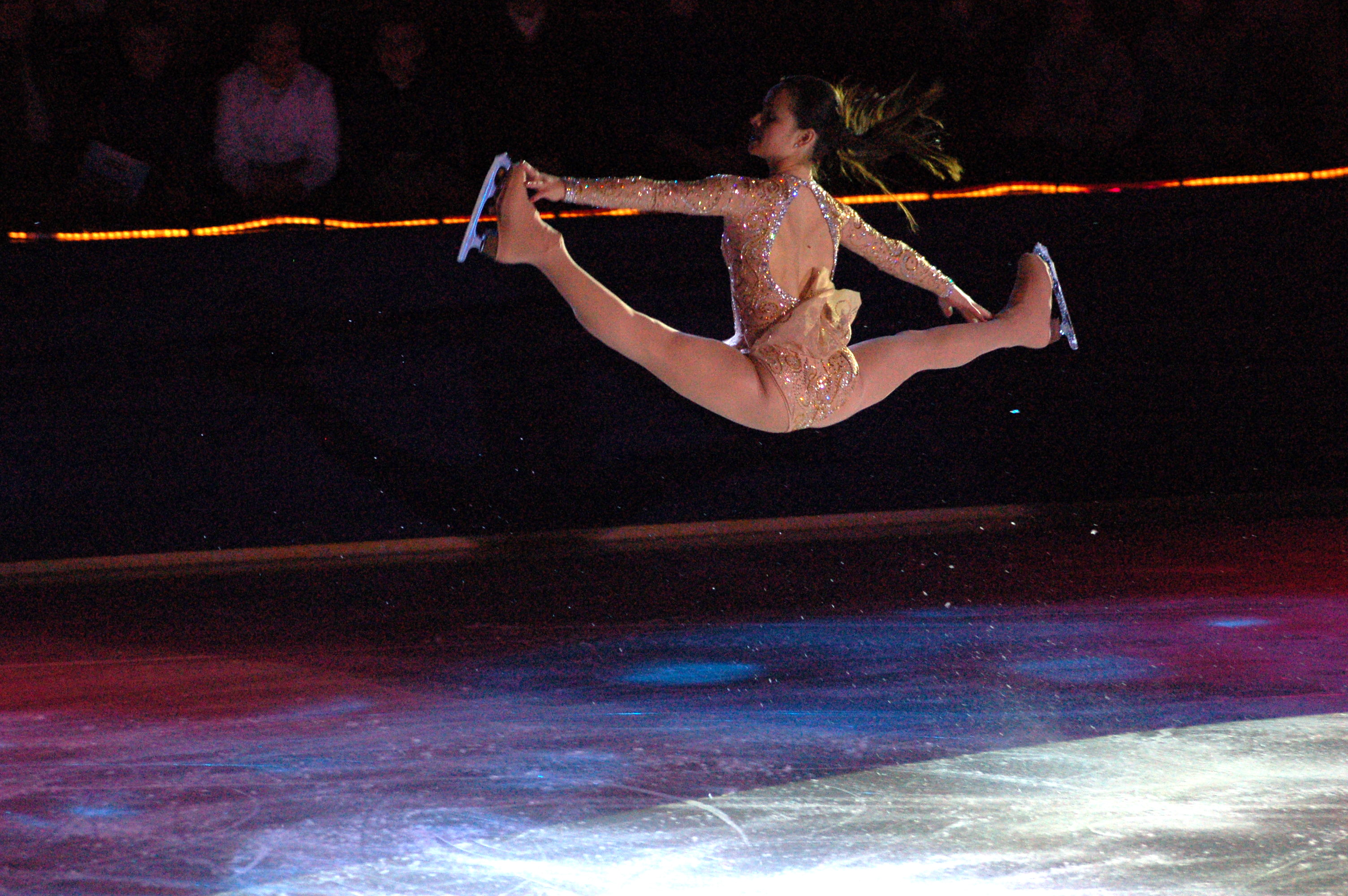
Cohen performs a Russian split jump.

Season	Short program	Free skating	Exhibition
2009–2010	España cañí by Pascual Marquina Narro choreo. by Lori Nichol	Moonlight Sonata by Ludwig van Beethoven choreo. by Nikolai Morozov	Sick and Tired by Anastacia choreo. by Sasha Cohen; Hallelujah by Leonard Cohen performed by Jeff Buckley choreo. by Sasha Cohen; Mein Herr (from Cabaret) by Kander and Ebb choreo. by Sasha Cohen
2008–2009	Did not compete		Moonlight Sonata by Ludwig van Beethoven choreo. by Nikolai Morozov; Don't Stop The Music by Rihanna choreo. by Sasha Cohen; I Could Not Ask for More by Sara Evans choreo. by Sasha Cohen; Hard to Say I'm Sorry by Chicago performed by Peter Cetera choreo. by Sasha Cohen; Blue Christmas by Elvis Presley performed by Peter Cetera choreo. by Sasha Cohen
2007–2008	Did not compete		What's Left Of Me by Nick Lachey choreo. by Sasha Cohen; Hurt by Christina Aguilera choreo. by Sasha Cohen
2006–2007	Did not compete		It's So Hard To Say Goodbye by Boyz II Men choreo. by Sasha Cohen; Anytime, Anywhere by Sarah Brightman choreo. by Sasha Cohen
2005–2006	Dark Eyes choreo. by Nikolai Morozov	Romeo and Juliet by Nino Rota, André Rieu choreo. by David Wilson	God Bless America by Celine Dion choreo. by Sasha Cohen; Don't Rain on My Parade by Barbra Streisand choreo. by John Nicks, Sasha Cohen
2004–2005	Dark Eyes choreo. by Nikolai Morozov	Pas de deux (from The Nutcracker) by Pyotr Ilyich Tchaikovsky choreo. by Marina Zueva, Igor Shpilband	Don't Rain on My Parade by Barbra Streisand choreo. by John Nicks, Sasha Cohen
2003–2004	Malagueña by Ernesto Lecuona choreo. by Tatiana Tarasova, Nikolai Morozov	Swan Lake by Pyotr Ilyich Tchaikovsky choreo. by Tatiana Tarasova	My Fair Lady by Frederick Loewe choreo. by Robin Wagner; Romeo and Juliet by Nino Rota, André Rieu choreo. by Tatiana Tarasova
2002–2003	Malagueña by Ernesto Lecuona choreo. by Tatiana Tarasova, Nikolai Morozov	Piano Concerto No. 2 by Sergei Rachmaninoff choreo. by Tatiana Tarasova, Nikolai Morozov	Romeo and Juliet by Nino Rota, André Rieu choreo. by Tatiana Tarasova; One Day I'll Fly Away (from Moulin Rouge!) by Nicole Kidman choreo. by Sasha Cohen
2001–2002	My Sweet and Tender Beast by Eugen Doga choreo. by John Nicks, Sasha Cohen	Carmen by Georges Bizet choreo. by John Nicks, Sasha Cohen	Hernando's Hideaway by Ella Fitzgerald choreo. by John Nicks, Sasha Cohen; Aria by Heitor Villa-Lobos choreo. by John Nicks, Ekaterina Gordeeva, Sasha Cohen
2000–2001	My Sweet and Tender Beast by Eugen Doga choreo. by John Nicks, Sasha Cohen	Dark Eyes orchestrated by the London Festival Orchestra choreo. by John Nicks, Sasha Cohen	Anytime, Anywhere by Sarah Brightman choreo. by John Nicks, Ekaterina Gordeeva, Sasha Cohen; To Love You More by Celine Dion choreo. by John Nicks, Sasha Cohen
1999–2000	Adagio in G minor by Tomaso Albinoni; The Four Seasons: Summer (Presto) by Antonio Vivaldi choreo. by John Nicks, Sasha Cohen	Violin Concerto by Felix Mendelssohn choreo. by John Nicks, Sasha Cohen	Madame Butterfly by Giacomo Puccini choreo. by John Nicks, Sasha Cohen
1998–1999	Piano Concerto No. 2 by Sergei Rachmaninoff		

== Competitive highlights ==
GP = Grand Prix; JGP = Junior Grand Prix

International
Event	98–99	99–00	00–01	01–02	02–03	03–04	04–05	05–06	09–10
Olympics				4th				2nd	
Worlds				4th	4th	2nd	2nd	3rd	
GP Final					1st	2nd			
GP Cup of Russia			4th		2nd				
GP Lalique/Bompard				3rd	1st	1st		2nd	WD
GP Skate America				5th		1st			WD
GP Skate Canada					1st	1st			
GP Sparkassen			5th						
Finlandia Trophy				1st					
International: Junior
Junior Worlds		6th							
JGP Sweden		1st							
Gardena	1st J								
National
U.S. Champ.	2nd J	2nd	WD	2nd	3rd	2nd	2nd	1st	4th

== Detailed results ==
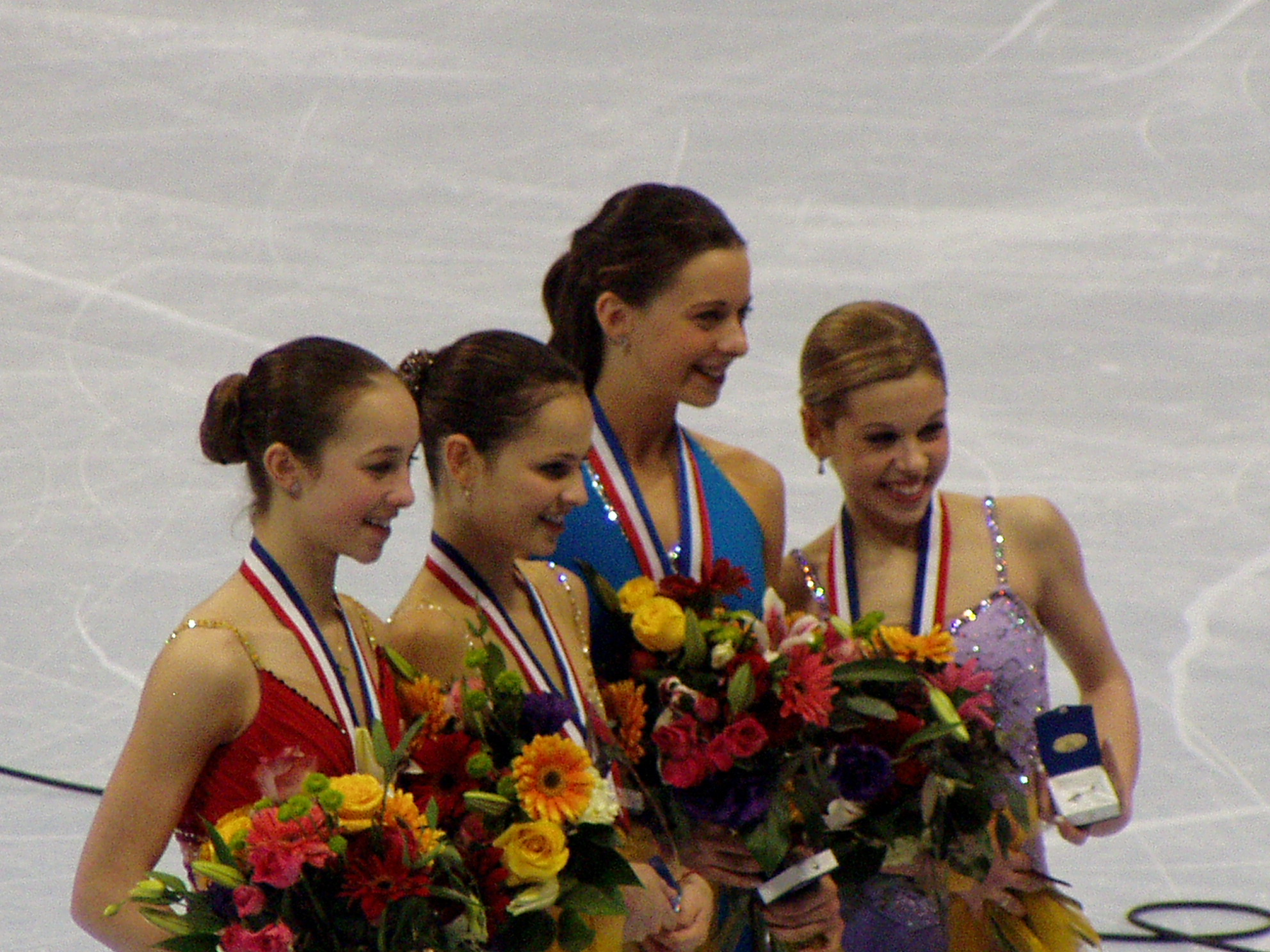
From left to right: Kimmie Meissner (silver), Sasha Cohen (gold), Emily Hughes (bronze), and Katy Taylor (pewter) at the 2006 U.S. Championships.

2009–2010 season
Date	Event	QR	SP	FS	Total
January 14–24, 2010	2010 U.S. Championships	–	2; 69.63	4; 104.65	4; 174.28
2005–2006 season
Date	Event	QR	SP	FS	Total
March 21–23, 2006	2006 World Championships	3; 27.59	1; 66.62	4; 114.67	3; 181.29
February 21–23, 2006	2006 Winter Olympics	–	1; 66.73	2; 116.63	2; 183.36
January 7–15, 2006	2006 U.S. Championships	–	1; 65.15	1; 134.03	1; 199.18
November 17–20, 2005	2005 Trophée Eric Bompard	–	2; 60.96	2; 114.16	2; 175.12
2004–2005 season
Date	Event	QR	SP	FS	Total
March 21–23, 2005	2005 World Championships	1; 28.41	2; 61.37	2; 124.61	2; 185.98
January 9–16, 2005	2005 U.S. Championships	–	2	2	2; 3.0
2003–2004 season
Date	Event	QR	SP	FS	Total
March 21–23, 2004	2004 World Championships	1	1	3	2; 4.0
January 9–16, 2004	2004 U.S. Championships	–	1	2	2; 2.5
December 11–14, 2003	2003–04 Grand Prix Final	–	2; 60.80	2; 116.68	2; 177.48
November 13–16, 2003	2003 Trophée Lalique	–	1; 69.38	1; 127.81	1; 197.19
October 28–31, 2003	2003 Skate Canada International	–	1; 71.12	1; 126.48	1; 197.60
October 23–26, 2003	2003 Skate America	–	1; 66.46	1; 130.89	1; 197.35
2002–2003 season
Date	Event	QR	SP	FS	Total
March 24–30, 2003	2003 World Championships	3	5	3	4; 7.2
February 28 – March 2, 2003	2002–03 Grand Prix Final	1 (SP)	2 (FS1)	1 (FS2)	1; 2.6
January 12–19, 2003	2003 U.S. Championships	–	3	2	2
November 22–24, 2002	2002 Cup of Russia	–	2	2	2; 3.0
November 14–17, 2002	2002 Trophée Lalique	–	2	1	1; 2.0
October 31 – November 3, 2002	2002 Skate Canada International	–	1	1	1; 1.5
2001–2002 season
Date	Event	QR	SP	FS	Total
March 16–24, 2002	2002 World Championships	2	5	4	4
February 21–23, 2002	2002 Winter Olympics	–	3	4	4; 5.5
January 6–13, 2002	2002 U.S. Championships	–	2	2	2; 3.0
November 15–18, 2001	2001 Trophée Lalique	–	3	3	3; 4.0
October 24–28, 2001	2001 Skate America	–	4	5	4; 7.0

- 2001: Goodwill Games – 4th; Finlandia Trophy – 1st
- 2000: U.S. Championships – 2nd; World Junior Championships – 6th; Nations Cup – 5th; Cup of Russia – 4th
- 1999: U.S. Championships, Junior – 2nd

== See also ==
- List of select Jewish figure skaters
- List of Jewish Olympic medalists

== Works cited ==
- Hines, James R. (2011). Historical Dictionary of Figure Skating. Lanham, Maryland: Scarecrow Press. ISBN 978-0-8108-6859-5.
