= Megan Williams-Stewart =

American figure skater

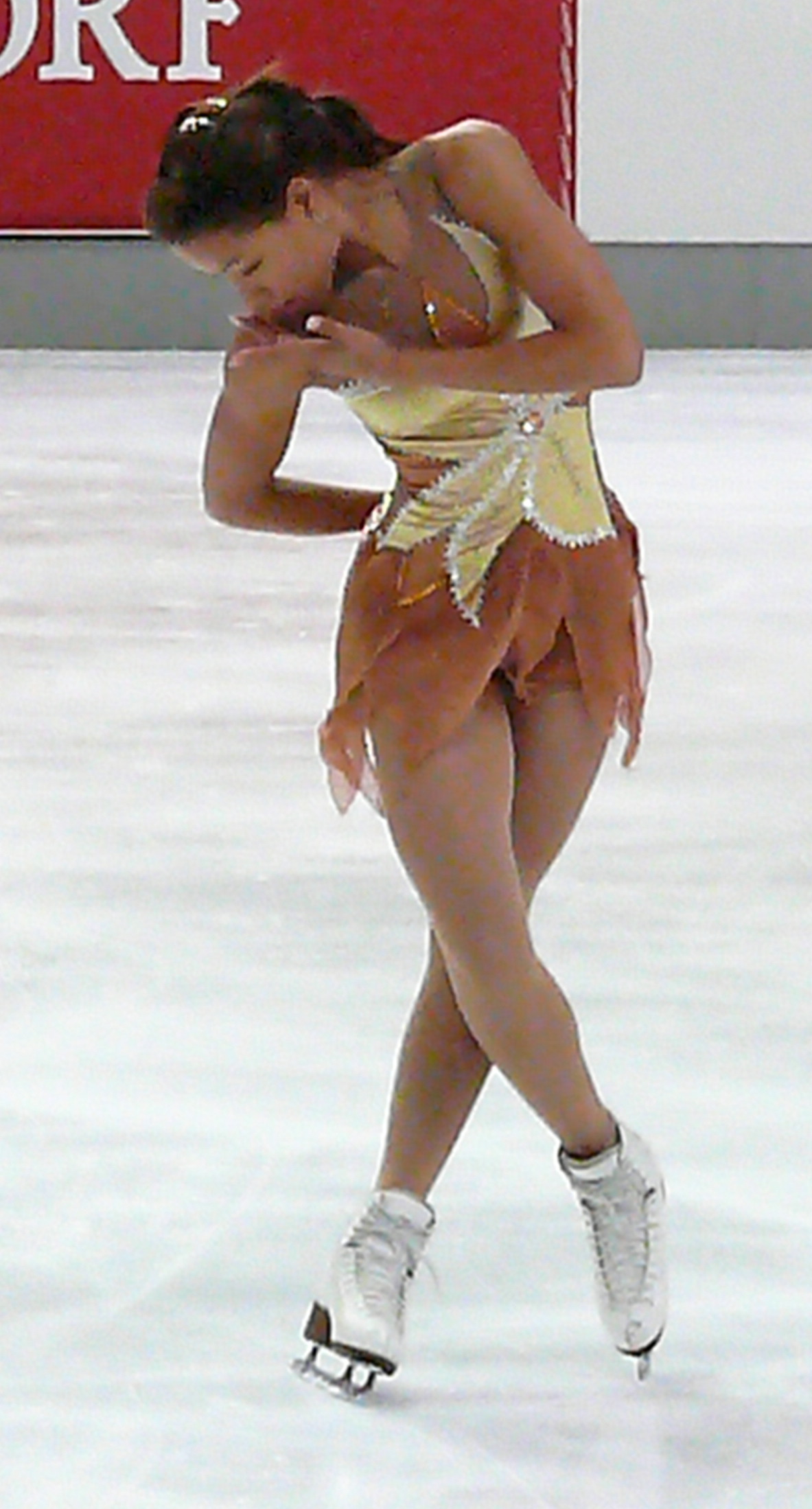
- Williams-Stewart at the 2007 Nebelhorn Trophy

Personal information
- Full name: Megan Williams-Stewart
- Born: June 27, 1987 (age 39) Takoma Park, Maryland, U.S.
- Home town: Ellicott City, Maryland, U.S.
- Height: 5 ft 6 in (1.67 m)

Figure skating career
- Country: Puerto Rico
- Skating club: University of Delaware FSC
- Began skating: 1990
- Retired: 2010

Megan Williams-Stewart (born June 27, 1987) is an American former competitive figure skater. She is the 2006 Ondrej Nepela Memorial champion and 2007 Nebelhorn Trophy silver medalist. She began representing Puerto Rico in the 2008–09 season and became the 2009 Puerto Rican national silver medalist.

== Personal life ==
Williams-Stewart was born on June 27, 1987, in Takoma Park, Maryland. She was raised in Ellicott, Maryland. Her mother, Ellen Williams, competed in speed skating, appearing five times at the U.S. Speed Skating Championships and winning a medal at the North American Speed Skating Championships.

== Career ==
Williams-Stewart first qualified for the U.S. Figure Skating Championships in the 2002–03 season. Skating on the junior level, she finished 13th at the 2003 U.S. Championships.

In the 2004–05 season, she qualified for the 2005 U.S. Championships on the senior level and placed 10th. Because of that placement, she was given a Junior Grand Prix assignment the following season.

In the 2005–06 season, Williams-Stewart competed at the 2005–06 ISU Junior Grand Prix event in Andorra and finished 5th. At the 2006 U.S. Championships, she repeated her 10th-place finish from the previous year.

In the 2006–07 season, having aged out of Juniors, Williams-Stewart was no longer eligible to compete on the Junior Grand Prix. She was sent to the 2006 Ondrej Nepela Memorial, a senior international competition, and won the event ahead of former European Champion Júlia Sebestyén. At the 2007 U.S. Championships, she placed 13th.

In the 2007–08 season, Williams-Stewart was assigned to another senior international competition, the Nebelhorn Trophy. There, she won the silver medal behind reigning European Champion Carolina Kostner and ahead of Finnish skater Laura Lepistö, who would go on to win the bronze medal at the 2008 European Championships. At the 2008 U.S. Championships, Williams-Stewart repeated her 13th-place finish of the previous year.

Following the 2007–08 season, Williams-Stewart switched to compete representing Puerto Rico. She was released by the U.S. Figure Skating Association in the summer of 2008 and began representing Puerto Rico in club competitions over the summer.

== Programs ==
Season	Short program	Free skating
2009–10	Love Theme of Romeo and Juliet	The Stone by Andreas Vollenweider; Beauty and the East; The Berber of Seville by Bombay Dub Orchestra; Tribal by Roni Benise
2007–08	It Ain't Necessarily So by George Gershwin; Caravan by Duke Ellington; The Thrill is Gone by B.B. King	The Stone by Andreas Vollenweider; Beauty and the East; The Berber of Seville by Bombay Dub Orchestra; Tribal by Roni Benise
2006–07	It Ain't Necessarily So by George Gershwin; Caravan by Duke Ellington; The Thrill is Gone by B.B. King	The Stone by Andreas Vollenweider; Beauty and the East; The Berber of Seville by Bombay Dub Orchestra; Tribal by Roni Benise
2005–06	Malagueña by Ernesto Lecuona	Out of Africa by John Barry; North and South

== Competitive highlights ==
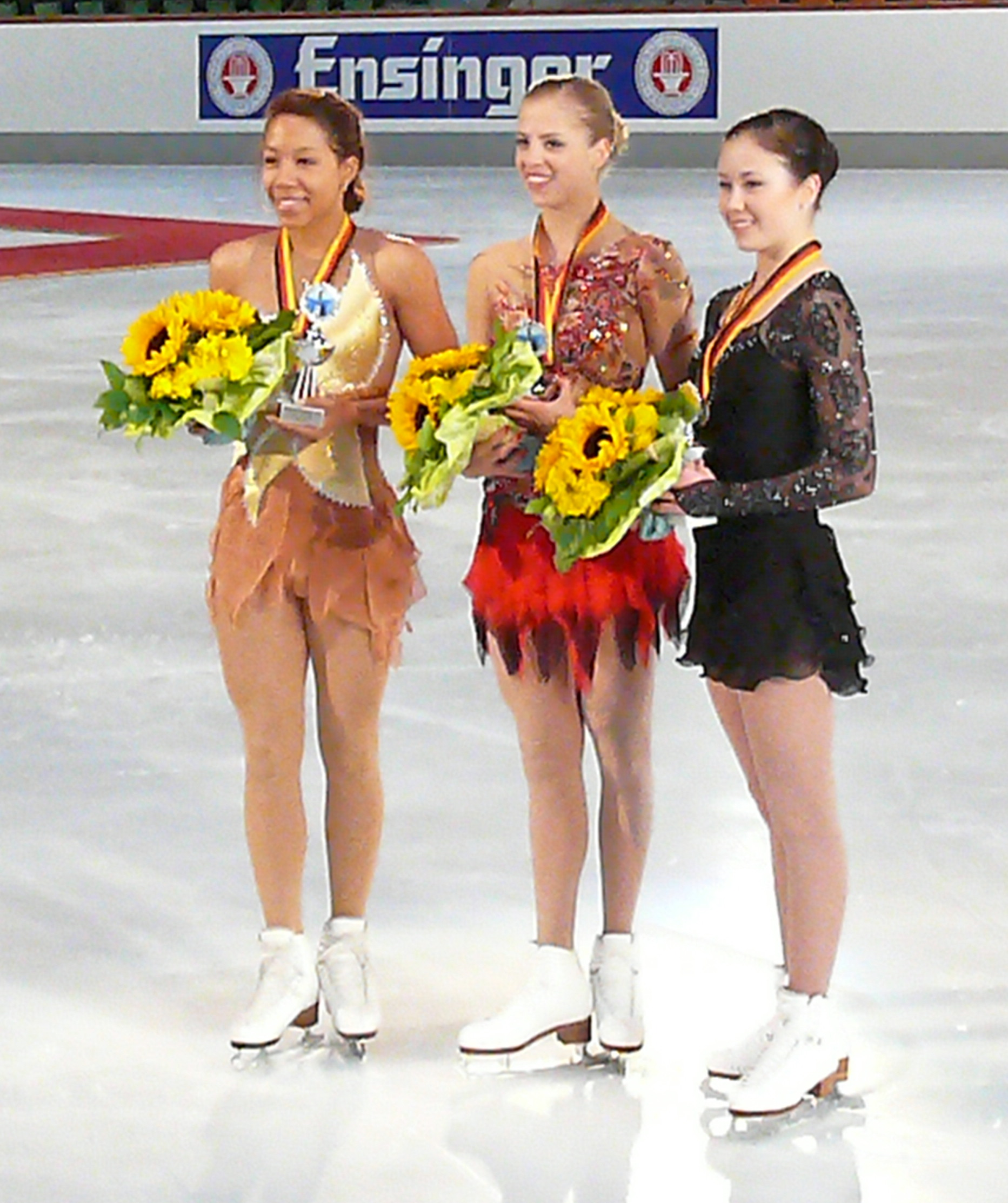
Williams-Stewart (left) at the 2007 Nebelhorn Trophy with Carolina Kostner (center) and Laura Lepistö (right).

JGP: Junior Grand Prix

International
Event	02–03 (USA)	04–05 (USA)	05–06 (USA)	06–07 (USA)	07–08 (USA)	08–09 (PUR)	09–10 (PUR)
Nebelhorn Trophy					2nd		25th
Nepela Memorial				1st			
JGP Andorra			5th				
National
U.S. Champ.	13th J.	10th	10th	13th	13th		
Puerto Rican Champ.						2nd	
