= Robin Wagner (figure skater) =

American figure skating coach (born 1957)

Robin Wagner (born December 15, 1957) is an American figure skating coach. She was a competitive skater in the late-1970s and competed at the United States Figure Skating Championships at the Novice and Junior levels. She trained with Sonia Dunfield, Peter Dunfield, and Gustav Lussi.

After retiring from competitive skating, Wagner graduated from Barnard College (1980) with a degree in psychology. She performed with Ice Theatre of New York and became a figure skating coach and choreographer.

Her former students include Sasha Cohen, Silvia Fontana, Elene Gedevanishvili, Sarah Hughes, and Rohene Ward.

Wagner is on the advisory board of Figure Skating in Harlem, a non-profit organization based in New York City that provides educational and athletic opportunities for girls.

== Results ==
Event	1972
U.S. Championships	3rd N.
