= Robert Davison (figure skater) =

Canadian pair skater

Personal information
- Full name: Robert Davison
- Born: January 7, 1978 (age 48) Calgary, Alberta, Canada
- Height: 1.75 m (5 ft 9 in)

Figure skating career
- Country: Canada
- Skating club: St Leonard CPA

Robert Davison (born January 7, 1978) is a Canadian former competitive pair skater. With partner Pascale Bergeron, he placed 6th at the 2005 Four Continents Championships and won the silver medals at the 2003 Finlandia Trophy and the 2003 & 2004 Nebelhorn Trophy. Before teaming up with Bergeron, Davison competed with Keridawn Thomson.

Davison was born in Calgary, Alberta, Canada.

== Competitive highlights ==
(with Bergeron)

Event	2001-2002	2002-2003	2003-2004	2004-2005
Four Continents Championships				6th
Canadian Championships	7th	5th	6th	5th
Skate Canada International				8th
Nebelhorn Trophy			2nd	2nd
Finlandia Trophy		4th	2nd	
