= Jennifer Don =

Taiwanese-American figure skater

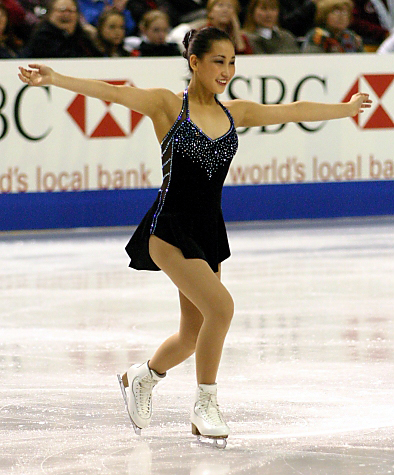
- Jennifer Don in 2004

Personal information
- Born: October 6, 1984 (age 41) Houston, Texas, U.S.
- Height: 5 ft 3 in (1.60 m)

Figure skating career
- Country: Chinese Taipei (2005–2007); United States (until 2004)
- Coach: Tiffany Chin
- Skating club: Texas Gulf Coast

Jennifer Don (born October 6, 1984; Chinese: 唐文珍; pinyin: Táng Wénzhēn) is a Taiwanese American figure skater who competed in both the pairs and singles disciplines. For most of her career, she represented the United States in competition. With partner Jonathon Hunt, she is the 2003 World Junior bronze medalist in pairs. As a single skater, she won the 2003 Nebelhorn Trophy, becoming the first woman to win a competition under the ISU International Judging System. In 2006, she represented Chinese Taipei. Jennifer is a PSA member and CER A certified.

== Personal life ==
Don was born on October 6, 1984, in Houston, Texas. She is an alumna of Clements High School in Sugar Land, Texas. She graduated from the University of California, Los Angeles (UCLA) in 2009, where she earned a bachelor's degree in Global Studies.

== Skating career ==
Don started skating at the age of 10. As a singles skater, she was the 2001 U.S. national bronze medalist on the novice level and the 2002 U.S. silver medalist on the junior level.

As a pair skater, Don won the bronze medal with Jonathon Hunt at the 2003 World Junior Championships. They announced the end of their partnership in March 2005, Hunt having decided to retire. Don was unable to find another partner so she decided to compete as a single skater for Taiwan. In 2005, she won the Chinese Taipei National Championships.

== Programs ==
=== Singles ===
Season	Short program	Free skating
2003–2004	Journey of Man from Cirque du Soleil by Benoît Jutras	Butterfly; Graduation by Mark Shaiman; Freedom Battle by Michael W. Smith

=== Pairs ===
With Hunt

Season	Short program	Free skating
2004–2005	Piano Concerto no. 2 Sergei Rachmaninoff	Cinderella by Sergei Prokofiev

== Competitive highlights ==
GP: Grand Prix; JGP: Junior Grand Prix

=== Single skating ===
For the United States until 2004 and then Chinese Taipei (Taiwan)

International
Event	01–02 (USA)	02–03 (USA)	03–04 (USA)	05–06 (TAI)	06–07 (TAI)
Four Continents			13th		
Golden Spin			6th		
Nebelhorn Trophy			1st		
Winter Universiade					25th
National
Chinese Taipei				1st	
United States	2nd J	11th	8th		

=== Pairs with Guzman ===
International
Event	2002
U.S. Championships	10th

=== Pairs with Hunt ===
International
Event	2002–03	2003–04	2004–05
GP Cup of Russia			4th
GP Skate America			7th
International: Junior
World Junior Champ.	3rd		
National
U.S. Championships	6th	4th	6th
