= Ryan O'Meara (figure skater) =

American ice dancer (born 1984)

Personal information
- Born: January 5, 1984 (age 42) Houston, Texas, U.S.
- Height: 5 ft 9 in (1.75 m)

Figure skating career
- Country: United States
- Skating club: Coyotes Skating Club
- Retired: 2006
Medal record
Figure skating: Ice dancing
Representing the United States
Four Continents Championships
Bronze medal – third place	2005 Hamilton	Ice dancing

Ryan O'Meara (born January 5, 1984) is an American ice dancer. With partner Jamie Silverstein, he is a 2006 Olympian. Following his retirement from competitive skating, he began working full-time as a coach and an interior designer.

== Career ==
O'Meara competed on the novice and junior levels with Melissa Ralph and Lia Nitake, having some success with them both. He won four straight medals at the U.S. Championships on the novice and junior levels between 1999 and 2002, two with Ralph and two with Nitake. He competed with Lydia Manon from 2003 to 2005. With Manon, he won the bronze medal at the 2005 U.S. Championships and at the 2005 Four Continents, following which Manon decided to end the partnership.

He began training with Jamie Silverstein, a former World Junior Champion with Justin Pekarek, in April 2005. They were coached by Igor Shpilband and Marina Zueva in Canton, Michigan. Silverstein and O'Meara had sudden success. They were sent as a host entry to the 2005 Skate America, their first international competition together as a team, and placed 5th.

They won the bronze medal at the 2006 U.S. Championships, which qualified them for the 2006 Winter Olympics and the 2006 Four Continents Championships. They competed at the Four Continents and placed 6th.

At the Olympics, they placed 18th in the compulsory dance, 16th in the original dance, and 18th in the free dance, placing 16th overall out of 23 teams. They chose not to compete at the 2006 World Championships. U.S. pewter medalists Morgan Matthews and Maxim Zavozin were sent in their place.

In the spring of 2006, Silverstein and O'Meara announced they would be taking time off from competitive skating. Their partnership ended soon after and O'Meara retired from competitive skating.

== Personal life ==
O'Meara works as a coach. He owns an interior design business called "Palavela Home", which is named after the Palavela, the venue for the figure skating competition at the Olympics.

O'Meara is openly gay.

== Competitive highlights ==
=== With Silverstein ===
Event	2005–06
Winter Olympic Games	16th
Four Continents Championships	6th
U.S. Championships	3rd
Skate America	5th
Pacific Coast Sectionals	1st

=== With Manon ===
Event	2003–04	2004–05
Four Continents Championships		3rd
U.S. Championships	6th	3rd
Nebelhorn Trophy	6th	1st
Pacific Coast Sectionals		1st
Midwestern Sectionals	1st	

=== With Ralph ===
Event	2000–01	2001–02
U.S. Championships	4th J.	2nd J.
Helmut Seibt Memorial		1st J.
J. = Junior level

=== With Nitake ===
Event	1998–99	1999–00
U.S. Championships	3rd N.	4th J.
N. = Novice level; J. = Junior level

== Programs ==
(with Silverstein)

Season	Original dance	Free dance
2005–2006	Salsa: Round the World; Rhumba: Sweet the Sting; Cha Cha	Nu Tango

(with Manon)

Season	Original dance	Free dance
2004–2005	You Can't Take that Away From Me; 42nd Street musical	Black Cat, White Cat (soundtrack) by Goran Bregovic
