= 2005 Four Continents Figure Skating Championships =

- Type: ISU Championship
- Date: February 14 – 20
- Season: 2004–05
- Location: Gangneung, South Korea
- Venue: Gangneung Ice Centre

Champions
- Men's singles: (United States) Evan Lysacek
- Ladies' singles: (Japan) Fumie Suguri
- Pairs: (China) Zhang Dan / Zhang Hao
- Ice dance: (United States) Tanith Belbin / Benjamin Agosto
- Previous: 2004 Four Continents Championships
- Next: 2006 Four Continents Championships

The 2005 Four Continents Figure Skating Championships was an international figure skating competition in the 2004–05 season. It was held at the Gangneung Ice Centre in Gangneung, South Korea on February 14–20. Medals were awarded in the disciplines of men's singles, ladies' singles, pair skating, and ice dancing. The compulsory dance was the Golden Waltz.

== Medals table ==
Rank	Nation	Gold	Silver	Bronze	Total
1	United States (USA)	2	1	3	6
2	China (CHN)	1	2	0	3
3	Japan (JPN)	1	1	1	3
Totals (3 entries)		4	4	4	12

== Results ==
=== Men ===
Rank	Name	Nation	Total points	SP		FS	
1	Evan Lysacek	United States	196.39	5	63.25	1	133.14
2	Li Chengjiang	China	194.09	1	72.10	3	121.99
3	Daisuke Takahashi	Japan	192.29	3	68.46	2	123.83
4	Ben Ferreira	Canada	188.36	2	68.86	5	119.50
5	Matthew Savoie	United States	185.38	4	65.00	4	120.38
6	Shawn Sawyer	Canada	173.15	6	60.77	7	112.38
7	Song Lun	China	164.08	10	51.30	6	112.78
8	Kensuke Nakaniwa	Japan	162.61	7	56.71	10	105.90
9	Zhang Min	China	162.53	8	54.80	8	107.73
10	Kazumi Kishimoto	Japan	160.41	9	54.07	9	106.34
11	Derrick Delmore	United States	153.38	11	50.86	11	102.52
12	Ricky Cockerill	New Zealand	127.02	14	39.25	12	87.77
13	Bradley Santer	Australia	121.57	13	41.44	13	80.13
14	Gareth Echardt	South Africa	120.77	12	46.15	14	74.62
15	Sean Carlow	Australia	111.85	15	39.05	15	72.80
16	Lee Dong-whun	South Korea	106.64	22	34.70	16	71.94
17	Stuart Beckingham	Australia	106.20	17	36.14	18	70.06
18	Humberto Contreras	Mexico	106.06	18	35.48	17	70.58
19	Justin Pietersen	South Africa	102.50	16	37.91	20	64.59
20	Miguel Angel Moyron	Mexico	101.58	19	35.34	19	66.24
21	Tristan Thode	New Zealand	96.85	21	35.00	21	61.85
22	Adrian Alvarado	Mexico	84.32	23	31.77	23	52.55
23	Edward Ka-yin Chow	Hong Kong	83.10	24	24.19	22	58.91
WD	Joel Watson	New Zealand		20	35.03		
WD	Fedor Andreev	Canada					

=== Ladies ===
Rank	Name	Nation	Total points	SP		FS	
1	Fumie Suguri	Japan	178.66	1	61.44	1	117.22
2	Yoshie Onda	Japan	166.80	2	58.02	2	108.78
3	Jennifer Kirk	United States	148.06	3	51.24	3	96.82
4	Joanne Carter	Australia	134.09	4	49.63	7	84.46
5	Lesley Hawker	Canada	133.20	10	43.98	5	89.22
6	Amber Corwin	United States	132.36	11	41.97	4	90.39
7	Beatrisa Liang	United States	130.78	5	47.30	8	83.48
8	Liu Yan	China	128.50	8	45.91	9	82.59
9	Miriam Manzano	Australia	122.72	16	37.64	6	85.08
10	Choi Ji-eun	South Korea	122.68	12	41.25	10	81.43
11	Yukari Nakano	Japan	121.74	9	45.17	12	76.57
12	Fang Dan	China	120.56	7	45.94	13	74.62
13	Vicky Boissonneault	Canada	119.06	6	46.34	14	72.72
14	Kim Chae-hwa	South Korea	117.84	14	40.45	11	77.39
15	Hou Na	China	112.26	13	40.77	15	71.49
16	Michelle Cantu	Mexico	93.99	15	37.67	20	56.32
17	Shin Yea-ji	South Korea	91.92	17	31.59	16	60.33
18	Shirene Human	South Africa	88.00	19	29.43	17	58.57
19	Diane Chen	Chinese Taipei	86.02	21	28.40	18	57.62
20	Jenna-Anne Buys	South Africa	82.38	24	25.68	19	56.70
21	Sarah-Yvonne Prytula	Australia	82.16	20	28.77	21	53.39
22	Ana Cecilia Cantu	Mexico	81.88	18	30.48	22	51.40
23	Gladys Orozco	Mexico	79.03	22	28.16	23	50.87
24	Shirley Hsin Hui Tsai	Chinese Taipei	66.28	23	25.70	24	40.58
Free Skating Not Reached
25	Nadezhda Paretskaia	Kazakhstan		25	21.73		

=== Pairs ===
Rank	Name	Nation	Total points	SP		FS	
1	Zhang Dan / Zhang Hao	China	181.61	1	63.67	1	117.94
2	Pang Qing / Tong Jian	China	177.80	2	62.07	2	115.73
3	Kathryn Orscher / Garrett Lucash	United States	153.05	3	56.15	3	96.90
4	Elizabeth Putnam / Sean Wirtz	Canada	145.08	4	53.86	4	91.22
5	Amanda Evora / Mark Ladwig	United States	133.92	6	44.45	5	89.47
6	Pascale Bergeron / Robert Davison	Canada	131.98	5	45.78	6	86.20
7	Brooke Castile / Benjamin Okolski	United States	124.59	8	42.00	7	82.59
8	Marina Aganina / Artem Knyazev	Uzbekistan	118.51	7	42.16	8	76.35

=== Ice dancing ===
Rank	Name	Nation	Total points	CD		OD		FD	
1	Tanith Belbin / Benjamin Agosto	United States	219.29	1	44.00	1	65.20	1	110.09
2	Melissa Gregory / Denis Petukhov	United States	183.97	2	38.02	2	55.10	2	90.85
3	Lydia Manon / Ryan O'Meara	United States	171.65	4	32.50	3	53.75	3	85.40
4	Nozomi Watanabe / Akiyuki Kido	Japan	166.84	3	32.63	4	51.52	5	82.69
5	Lauren Senft / Leif Gislason	Canada	160.89	8	30.04	6	47.49	4	83.36
6	Mylène Girard / Bradley Yaeger	Canada	160.41	9	29.73	5	48.17	6	82.51
7	Martine Patenaude / Pascal Denis	Canada	151.59	6	31.10	8	44.91	7	75.58
8	Nakako Tsuzuki / Kenji Miyamoto	Japan	150.45	5	31.13	7	46.09	9	73.23
9	Laura Munana / Luke Munana	Mexico	144.39	11	27.85	10	41.57	8	74.97
10	Yang Fang / Gao Chongbo	China	140.88	7	30.93	9	42.50	10	67.45
11	Yu Xiaoyang / Wang Chen	China	135.63	10	29.47	11	39.44	11	66.72
12	Wang Jiayue / Meng Fei	China	125.21	12	27.83	12	35.29	12	62.09
13	Olga Akimova / Alexander Shakalov	Uzbekistan	117.04	13	23.98	14	32.05	13	61.01
14	Natalie Buck / Trent Nelson-Bond	Australia	111.55	14	23.52	13	32.82	14	55.21
15	Kim Hye-min / Kim Min-woo	South Korea	104.74	16	21.98	15	30.35	15	52.41
16	Ashley Duenas / Ramil Sarkulov	Uzbekistan	104.40	15	22.39	16	30.08	16	51.93
17	Danika Bourne / Alexander Pavlov	Australia	100.68	17	20.63	17	28.65	17	51.40
