= Aaron Parchem =

American pair skater

Personal information
- Born: June 6, 1977 (age 49) Columbus, Ohio, U.S.
- Height: 5 ft 9 in (1.76 m)

Figure skating career
- Country: United States
- Retired: May 30, 2006

Aaron Parchem (born June 6, 1977) is an American former pair skater. He competed at the 2006 Winter Olympics with partner Marcy Hinzmann.

== Personal life ==
Aaron Parchem was born June 6, 1977, in Columbus, Ohio. He was adopted by Al and Georga Parchem from the Chicago area and was raised with an adopted sister. In spring 2003, he graduated from the University of Detroit Mercy with an undergraduate degree in economics. As of November 2017, he is a senior financial consultant at Comerica Securities Inc.

Parchem married Polish single skater Zuzanna Szwed in Chicago in 2004. They have a daughter, Sofie (born c. 2011).

== Career ==
After trying pairs at age 19, Parchem switched to the discipline a year later. He initially skated with Shawna Winter.

Coaches at the Detroit Skating Club paired him with Stephanie Kalesavich in March 1999. The pair won the 2000 Golden Spin of Zagreb and took bronze at the 2001 Nebelhorn Trophy. They competed at one ISU Championship, the 2002 Four Continents, where they placed fifth.

In April 2003, Parchem teamed up with Marcy Hinzmann. She tore the anterior cruciate ligament in her left knee during a practice in August 2004 and skated with the injury during the season. She underwent surgery following the U.S. Championships in January 2005 and was off the ice for four months.

In 2005, the pair won the bronze medal at the U.S. Figure Skating Championships. In 2006 they won the silver medal at the U.S. Figure Skating Championships and represented the United States at the 2006 Winter Olympics in Torino, Italy.

== Programs ==
=== With Hinzmann ===
Season	Short program	Free skating
2005–2006	The Mission by Ennio Morricone performed by Yo-Yo Ma	Esperanza by Maxime Rodriguez; Once Upon a Time in Mexico by Robert Rodriguez
2004–2005	Hey You; The Fletcher Memorial Home by Pink Floyd	Esperanza by Maxime Rodriguez; Once Upon a Time in Mexico by Robert Rodriguez
2003–2004	Tosca by Giacomo Puccini	Coeur Brave by Maxime Rodriguez

=== With Kalesavich ===
Season	Short program	Free skating
2002–2003	El Conquistador by Maxime Rodriguez	Warsaw Concerto by Richard Addinsell BBC Symphony Orchestra
2001–2002	Little Wing by Stevie Ray Vaughan	Les Misérables by Claude-Michel Schönberg

== Results ==
=== With Hinzmann ===
International
Event	2003–04	2004–05	2005–06
Winter Olympics			13th
World Championships			11th
Four Continents Champ.			4th
GP Skate America			4th
Bofrost Cup on Ice		6th	
Finlandia Trophy	3rd		
Nebelhorn Trophy		1st	3rd
National
U.S. Championships	7th	3rd	2nd

=== With Kalesavich ===
International
Event	1999–00	2000–01	2001–02	2002–03
Four Continents Champ.			5th	
GP NHK Trophy			6th	
GP Skate Canada			5th	8th
GP Trophée Lalique				7th
Goodwill Games			6th	
Golden Spin of Zagreb		1st		
Nebelhorn Trophy		3rd		
National
U.S. Championships	1st J.	4th	3rd	5th

=== With Winter ===
National
Event	1999
U.S. Championships	9th J.
