= Garrett Lucash =

American pair skater

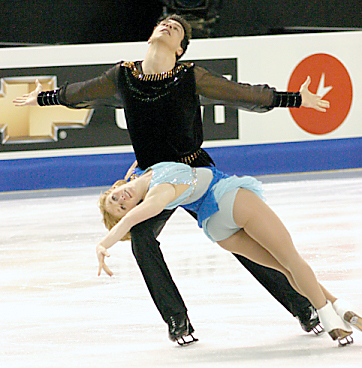

Personal information
- Born: September 21, 1978 (age 47) Attleboro, Massachusetts, U.S.
- Height: 5 ft 9 in (1.75 m)

Figure skating career
- Country: United States
- Skating club: Charter Oak FSC
- Retired: April 5, 2006
Medal record
Pairs Figure skating
Representing United States
Four Continents Championships
Bronze medal – third place	2005 Hamilton	Pairs

Garrett Lucash (born September 21, 1978, in Attleboro, Massachusetts) is an American pair skater. With partner Katie Orscher, he is the 2005 U.S. national champion and 2005 Four Continents bronze medalist.

== Career ==
Lucash was searching for a new partner when he remembered Orscher and gave her a call. Unlike most skaters, they both rotate clockwise. They trained in Simsbury, Connecticut.

In 2005, Orscher and Lucash won the gold medal at the U.S. Championships. They went on to win the bronze medal at the 2005 Four Continents Championships. At the 2005 Worlds, their placement combined with that of Rena Inoue / John Baldwin earned the United States two entries to the 2006 Winter Olympics.

In the summer of 2005, Orscher broke her foot, causing them to lose training time before the 2005–06 season. In January 2006 at the U.S Championships in St. Louis, Missouri, they were in first after the short program but dropped to third after the long program and missed the Olympic team by .66 points.

Orscher and Lucash announced their retirement from competitive skating in April 2006. Lucash is the co-creator and director of the National Figure Skating Academy in Boston, along with Dmitri Palamarchuk.

== Personal life ==
Lucash is a Boston Red Sox fan. On August 1, 2007, he was featured on the first episode of the Red Sox themed dating show Sox Appeal, in which he went on three blind dates at Fenway Park during a Red Sox game against the San Francisco Giants.

== Programs ==
(with Orscher)

Season	Short program	Free skating	Exhibition
2005–2006	Egyptian Disco by DJ Disse	Samson and Delilah by Camille Saint-Saëns	
2004–2005	Still Got the Blues by Gary Moore	Samson and Delilah by Camille Saint-Saëns	
2003–2004	Still Got the Blues by Gary Moore	Spartacus by Aram Khachaturian	Iris by Goo Goo Dolls
2002–2003	Quidam (from Cirque du Soleil)	Spartacus by Aram Khachaturian	
2001–2002	Unchained Melody Mythos N DS Cosmo	The Black Stallion Returns by Georges Delerve	

== Competitive highlights ==
=== With MacAdam ===
Event	1998	1999
U.S. Championships	2nd J.	2nd J.
J. = Junior level

=== With Waldstein ===
Event	2000
U.S. Championships	3rd J.
J. = Junior level

=== With Orscher ===
Results
International
Event	2001–02	2002–03	2003–04	2004–05	2005–06
Worlds		16th	13th	12th	
Four Continents	10th	6th	7th	3rd	5th
GP Cup of China					6th
GP Trophée Eric Bompard				5th	
GP Skate America		7th	8th	6th	
GP Skate Canada		7th	9th		
Nebelhorn		3rd			
National
U.S. Champ.	5th	2nd	2nd	1st	3rd
GP = Grand Prix
