= Stars on Ice (Canadian TV series) =

Canadian variety show

- Genre: Variety show; Ice show
- Directed by: Michael Steele
- Presented by: Alex Trebek (1976–1980); Doug Crosley (1980–81)
- Country of origin: Canada
- Original language: English
- No. of seasons: 5

Production
- Producer: Michael Steele
- Running time: 30 minutes

Original release
- Network: CTV
- Release: 21 September 1976 – 1981

Stars on Ice is a weekly television ice show, which was broadcast from 1976 to 1981 on the CTV Television Network in Canada. The series' ice-skating host was Alex Trebek (1976–1980) and later, Doug Crosley (1980–81). Toller Cranston was a frequent performer.

The show consisted of figure-skating stars performing routines in costume. It was a successful in-house production of CTV, filmed on an ice rink in a large studio at CFTO-TV in Toronto, and sold to other Canadian outlets.

The series was produced and directed by Michael Steele, had a regular cast of 14 world-class ice professionals, most of whom taught skating locally. The variety-show format on ice consisted of a glitzy "show opener" by the regular cast of skaters and a bigger budget production number (usually tributes to Hollywood musicals) with elaborate set pieces in the middle of the half-hour.

Rounding out the half-hour were famous and novelty-act figure skaters, vaudeville-type acts, and "affordable" (on the series' modest budget) non-skating celebrities at the B-list phase of their careers, such as Davy Jones and Micky Dolenz (formerly of The Monkees), Eddie Mekka of Laverne & Shirley, and 1960s recording artist Donovan.

Due to being only minimally dependent on language, and its unusual ice-variety show format, the series was widely syndicated internationally.

The name was later adopted by a live touring figure skating show in 1986, headlined by Scott Hamilton and Dorothy Hamill. This ice show had occasional televised specials, one of which was nominated for a 2015 Canadian Screen Award.
