= Kimberly Navarro =

American ice dancer

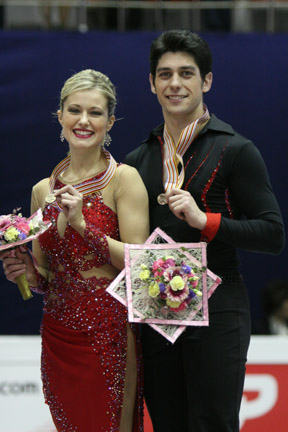
- Navarro and Bommentre in 2008.

Personal information
- Born: April 26, 1981 (age 45) Santa Rosa, California, U.S.
- Height: 5 ft 4 in (1.62 m)

Figure skating career
- Country: United States
- Partner: Brent Bommentre; Former: Robert Shmalo; Nick Hart; Matthew Tinney
- Coach: Robbie Kaine; Cheryl Demkowski Snyder; Renee Roca; Jeannine Osayande; Natalia Linichuk
- Skating club: Santa Rosa FSC (trained in Ardmore, Pennsylvania)
- Began skating: 1984
- Retired: May 11, 2010
Medal record
Figure skating: Ice dancing
Representing the United States
Four Continents Championships
Bronze medal – third place	2008 Goyang	Ice dancing

Kimberly Navarro (born April 26, 1981) is an American former competitive ice dancer. With partner Brent Bommentre, she is the 2008 Four Continents bronze medalist and a two-time (2008 & 2009) U.S. national bronze medalist.

== Personal life ==
Navarro was born on April 26, 1981, in Santa Rosa, California. In May 2004, she graduated cum laude from Columbia University. In May 2016, she married Mark Freeman in Ketchum, Idaho. Their daughter, Anna Granada Freeman, was born on May 6, 2017, in San Francisco.

== Career ==
Navarro competed with Robert Shmalo early in her career.

Navarro teamed up with Brent Bommentre after a tryout in April 2005. They won the bronze medal at the 2008 U.S. Championships, and were chosen to represent the United States at the 2008 Four Continents, where they finished in 3rd, and the 2008 World Championships in Gothenburg, Sweden, where they were 12th. At the 2009 Nationals, Navarro/Bommentre again finished 3rd, but were left off the Worlds team in favor of Tanith Belbin / Benjamin Agosto, who had missed U.S. Nationals due to injury. They did compete at the 2009 Four Continents, where they finished in sixth place.

In the Olympic season, Navarro/Bommentre finished 4th at U.S. Nationals, and were not named to the Olympic team. When Belbin/Agosto ended their competitive career following the Olympics, they were selected to compete at the 2010 World Championships. They were 14th in their second Worlds appearance. Navarro/Bommentre announced their retirement from competition on May 11, 2010.

In 2011, Navarro joined the cast of Battle of the Blades for the show's third season, and was originally paired with the late Wade Belak. In the season-opening episode, Russ Courtnall was named as her partner.

Navarro/Bommentre perform with the Ice Theatre of New York and, in November 2012, they taped an appearance in an episode of Glee.

== Programs ==
=== With Bommentre ===
Season	Original dance	Free dance
2009–10	Quero Voltar Pra Angola by Alex Shaw	One by Mary J. Blige featuring U2
2008–09	Hey Pachuco! by Royal Crown Review; Why Don't You Do Right? by Sinéad O'Connor	Weapon of Choice; The Rockafeller Skank; Soul Surfing by Fatboy Slim
2007–08	Ijuba 2: First Movement; Ijuba 2: Second Movement; Ijuba by Soweto Percussion Ensemble	Since I've Been Loving You by Corinne Bailey Rae
2006–07	Assassin's Tango (from Mr. & Mrs. Smith) by John Powell; Little Drop of Poison by Tom Waits; Assassin's Tango	The Beatles medley: Golden Slumbers; Carry that Weight; The End
2005–06	Dance With Me by Debelah Morgan; Represent, Cuba (from "Havana Nights" soundtrack) by Heather Hedley	How Sweet It Is; Feelin' Good by Michael Bublé

=== With Shmalo ===
Season	Original dance	Free dance
2002–03	March; Waltz	Tumba; Summertime; Adouma by Angelique Kidjo

== Results ==
GP: Grand Prix

=== With Bommentre ===
International
Event	05–06	06–07	07–08	08–09	09–10
World Champ.			12th		14th
Four Continents Champ.		5th	3rd	6th	
GP Bompard					6th
GP NHK Trophy			6th	6th	
GP Skate America		6th	6th		5th
GP Skate Canada		6th		5th	
Schäfer Memorial	5th	3rd			
National
U.S. Championships	5th	4th	3rd	3rd	4th

=== With Shmalo ===
International
Event	99–00	00–01	01–02	02–03	03–04
GP NHK Trophy				8th	
Finlandia Trophy					5th
Nebelhorn Trophy			9th		
Golden Spin of Zagreb		13th			
National
U.S. Championships	10th	6th	6th	7th	

=== With Tinney and Hart ===
Event	1995–96 (with Tinney)	1997–98 (with Hart)
U.S. Championships	10th N.	10th J.
Levels: N. = Novice; J. = Junior
