= Scott Smith (figure skater) =

American figure skater

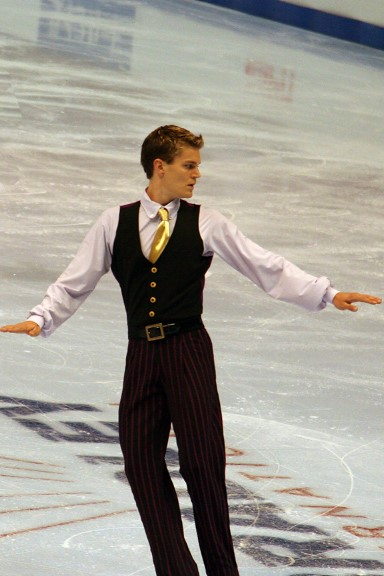
- Smith in 2006

Personal information
- Born: October 19, 1981 (age 44) Fort Lauderdale, Florida, U.S.
- Height: 5 ft 6 in (1.68 m)

Figure skating career
- Country: United States
- Skating club: SC of Boston
- Began skating: 1989
- Retired: 2009

Scott Smith (born October 19, 1981) is an American retired figure skater. He won three senior international medals—silver at the 2003 Nebelhorn Trophy and 2003 Karl Schäfer Memorial, gold at the 2005 Ondrej Nepela Memorial—and placed fifth at the 2005 Four Continents Championships.

== Career ==
Smith represented the Skating Club of Boston. He is not to be confused with Scott Smith who skated pairs with Erin Goto and Christie Baca in southern California.

At the 2006 U.S. Championships, he was the only competitor to land a clean quadruple jump.

Smith trained, for a time, at the University of Delaware Figure Skating Club in Newark, Delaware, then moved to the Skating Club of Boston, and was coached by Mark Mitchell and Peter Johansson. His programs have been choreographed by Jamie Isley, Lori Nichol and Nikolai Morozov. Before the 2008 U.S. Figure Skating Championships, he changed coaches again, this time to work with Stephanie Grosscup in Salt Lake City.

Smith withdrew from the 2009 U.S. Championships due to muscle spasms in his back, just before he was to skate his short program. He hoped to compete at the 2010 U.S. Championships but needed surgery on his left hip in December 2009.

== Programs ==
Season	Short program	Free skating
2009–2010	Victory	James Bond soundtracks
2008–2009	Nerve Center by Vangelis	Casino Royale by David Arnold
2007–2008	Night Train by Buddy Morrow	Asturias by John Williams
2006–2007	Night Train by Buddy Morrow	Romeo + Juliet
2005–2006	Freedom by Michael W. Smith	The Mask of Zorro by James Horner
2004–2005	Freedom by Michael W. Smith	The Prophet
2003–2004	Time	Concerto for Saxophone
2002–2003	Moulin Rouge! by Jose Feliciano	Shrek

== Results ==
GP: Grand Prix; JGP: Junior Grand Prix

International
Event	97–98	98–99	99–00	00–01	01–02	02–03	03–04	04–05	05–06	06–07	07–08	08–09
Four Continents						8th			5th			
GP Bompard											9th	
GP Cup of China							8th	6th		4th		
GP Skate Canada											9th	
GP Skate America							5th			6th		
Finlandia Trophy								4th				
Golden Spin						4th						
Nebelhorn Trophy							2nd					7th
Nepela Memorial									1st			
Schäfer Memorial			6th				2nd					
International: Junior
JGP Czech Rep.			6th									
JGP Germany		3rd										
JGP Japan			5th									
JGP Slovakia		4th										
National
U.S. Champ.	1st J	14th		18th	9th	4th	9th	9th	5th	5th	6th	WD
