= Benjamin Agosto =

American ice dancer (born 1982)

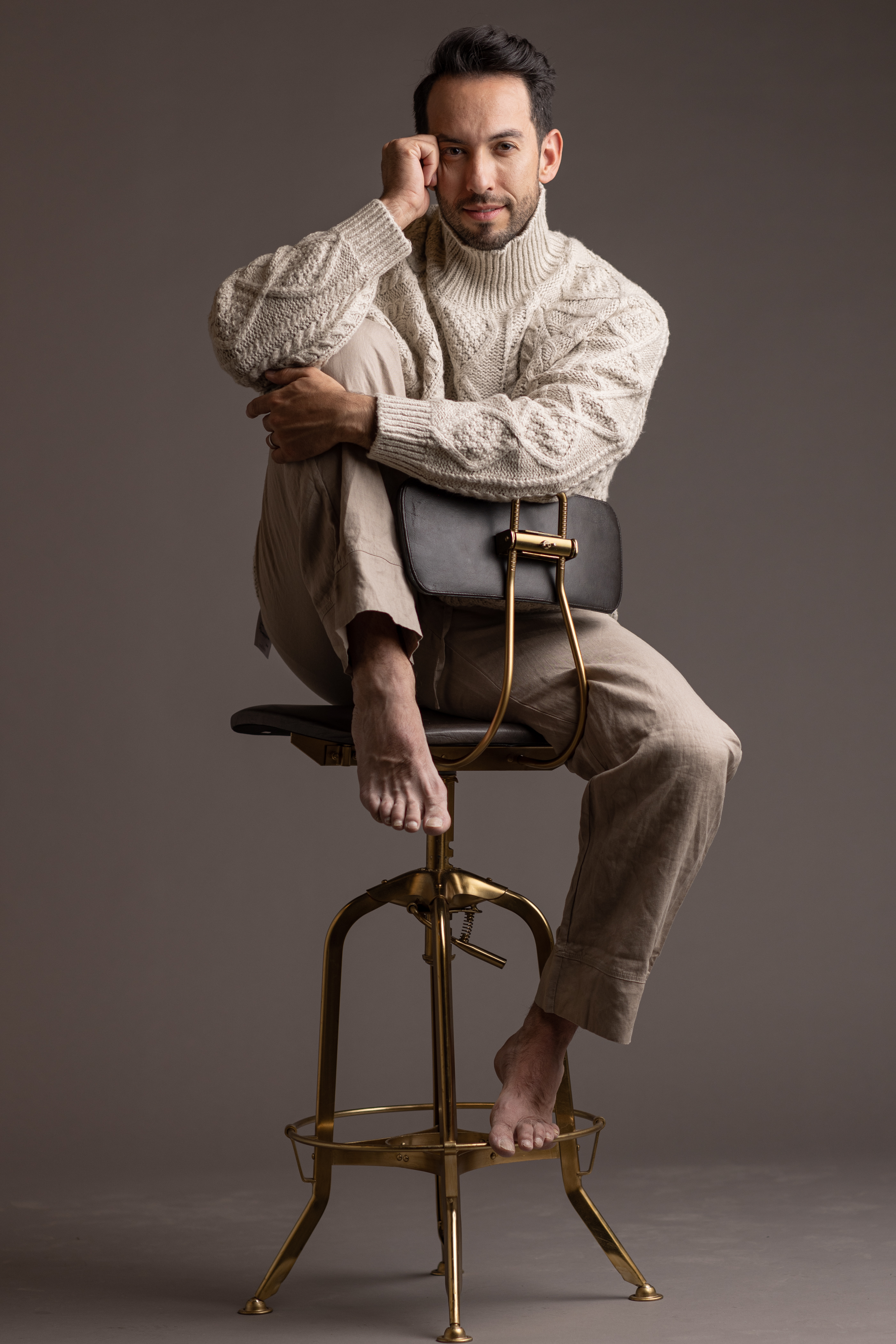
- Portrait of Benjamin Agosto 2023

Personal information
- Full name: Benjamin Alexandro Agosto
- Born: January 15, 1982 (age 44) Chicago, Illinois, U.S.
- Height: 5 ft 10 in (1.78 m)

Figure skating career
- Country: United States
- Partner: Tanith Belbin
- Skating club: Arctic FSC
- Began skating: 1989
- Retired: June 2010
Event	Gold medal – first place	Silver medal – second place	Bronze medal – third place
Olympic Games	0	1	0
World Championships	0	2	2
Four Continents Championships	3	3	0
Grand Prix Final	0	2	1
U.S. Championships	5	4	0
World Team Trophy	1	0	0
World Junior Championships	1	1	1
Junior Grand Prix Final	1	0	0
Medal list
Olympic Games
Silver medal – second place	2006 Turin	Ice dance
World Championships
Silver medal – second place	2005 Moscow	Ice dance
Silver medal – second place	2009 Los Angeles	Ice dance
Bronze medal – third place	2006 Calgary	Ice dance
Bronze medal – third place	2007 Tokyo	Ice dance
Four Continents Championships
Gold medal – first place	2004 Hamilton	Ice dance
Gold medal – first place	2005 Gangneung	Ice dance
Gold medal – first place	2006 Colorado Springs	Ice dance
Silver medal – second place	2002 Jeonju	Ice dance
Silver medal – second place	2003 Beijing	Ice dance
Silver medal – second place	2007 Colorado Springs	Ice dance
Grand Prix Final
Silver medal – second place	2004–05 Beijing	Ice dance
Silver medal – second place	2007–08 Turin	Ice dance
Bronze medal – third place	2003–04 Colorado Springs	Ice dance
U.S. Championships
Gold medal – first place	2004 Atlanta	Ice dance
Gold medal – first place	2005 Portland	Ice dance
Gold medal – first place	2006 St. Louis	Ice dance
Gold medal – first place	2007 Spokane	Ice dance
Gold medal – first place	2008 St. Paul	Ice dance
Silver medal – second place	2001 Boston	Ice dance
Silver medal – second place	2002 Los Angeles	Ice dance
Silver medal – second place	2003 Dallas	Ice dance
Silver medal – second place	2010 Spokane	Ice dance
World Team Trophy
Gold medal – first place	2009 Tokyo	Team
World Junior Championships
Gold medal – first place	2002 Hamar	Ice dance
Silver medal – second place	2001 Sofia	Ice dance
Bronze medal – third place	2000 Oberstdorf	Ice dance
Junior Grand Prix Final
Gold medal – first place	2000–01 Ayr	Ice dance

Benjamin Alexandro Agosto (born January 15, 1982) is an American ice dancer. With partner Tanith Belbin, Agosto is the 2006 Olympic silver medalist, a four-time World medalist, the 2004–2006 Four Continents champion, and 2004–2008 U.S. champion.

== Personal life ==
Benjamin Agosto was born January 15, 1982, in Chicago, Illinois, and raised in Northbrook, Illinois. He is the son of a Puerto Rican father and a Jewish mother whose family have roots in Romania and Russia. Agosto attended grade school at the Chicago Waldorf School, then spent two years at Glenbrook North High School, and graduated with honors from Michigan's Groves High School in June 2000. He played in a high school jazz band.

Agosto lived in Detroit, Michigan, from June 1998 and then Canton, Michigan, before moving to Aston, Pennsylvania, in the summer of 2008. He relocated to Lacey, Washington, in September 2010 and then to Scottsdale, Arizona, in 2014.

== Career ==
=== Early years ===
Agosto started skating at age six, after receiving a pair of ice skates for his birthday, and started ice dancing at about age 12. Early in his career, he was coached by Susie Wynne. He skated with Katie Hill from 1995 to 1998, competing with her on the novice and junior levels, including internationally. They skated out of Midwestern Section. When that partnership ended, Agosto moved from Chicago to Michigan in 1998 in order to train under Igor Shpilband.

=== Partnership with Belbin ===
In 1998, Agosto's coach partnered him with Canadian Tanith Belbin. In the 1999–2000 season, they won a pair of medals on the ISU Junior Grand Prix series and finished 4th at the JGP Final. They went on to win the U.S. junior national title and then took the bronze medal at the 2000 World Junior Championships. In 2000–2001, Belbin/Agosto competed again on the JGP series, taking gold in all three of their events including the Final. They appeared on the senior level at the 2001 U.S. Championships and won the silver medal, qualifying them for their first senior World Championships, where they finished 17th.

In 2001–2002, Belbin/Agosto made their senior Grand Prix debut and won another silver medal at the U.S. Championships, which would have qualified them for the 2002 Winter Olympics if Belbin had been an American citizen. Instead, Belbin/Agosto were sent to all the other ISU Championships for which they were eligible: Four Continents, Junior Worlds, and Worlds. They won the 2002 World Junior Championships, completing their set of medals from that event. Following that season, Agosto aged out of juniors.

Belbin/Agosto won the 2004 U.S. national title and would go on to repeat four times. At Nationals in 2005, the last year of the 6.0 system, they received straight perfect sixes for presentation in their free dance. Of the 30 6.0s given out in ice dance at U.S. Nationals, Belbin/Agosto have 14 of them. Their total 6.0 count at the U.S. Championships is second only to Michelle Kwan (38).

In February 2005, Belbin/Agosto organized and performed in their own figure skating benefit show, Skate Aid for Tsunami Relief, which raised more than $37,000 for Red Cross relief efforts.

Belbin/Agosto won the silver medal at the 2005 World Championships. Their silver medal combined with the placement of the other American team earned the United States three spots to the Olympics in ice dance, the first time this had happened since 1984. By a special act of Congress that passed on December 28, 2005, which President Bush signed on New Year's Eve, 2005, Belbin became a naturalized citizen of the US, making her able to compete for the United States at the 2006 Winter Olympics. Belbin/Agosto went on to win the Olympic silver medal in ice dance on February 20, 2006. They were the first American ice dance team since 1976, the first year ice dancing was contested at the Olympics, to win an Olympic medal.

Belbin/Agosto began the 2006–2007 season with a free dance called That's Entertainment but arrived at Nationals with a new program to the music of Amelie. They won gold at Nationals, the silver medal at Four Continents, and the bronze at Worlds.

In 2007–2008, they won gold medals at both Skate America and Cup of China which qualified them for the Grand Prix Final, where they took the silver medal. They won their 5th national title and then placed 4th at the 2008 Worlds after a fall by Belbin in the compulsory dance. Belbin/Agosto were regular cast members of the Champions on Ice tour from 2004 until COI went out of business following the 2007 season. They were guest stars on part of the 2008 Stars on Ice tour.

In April 2008, Belbin/Agosto left Igor Shpilband and began working with the married coaching team of Natalia Linichuk and Gennadi Karponosov at the Ice Works Skating Complex in Aston, Pennsylvania. In addition to teaching different technique, Linichuk advised Belbin to gain 10 pounds and develop some muscles in order to skate faster and more fluidly. This also gave Belbin more core strength to hold her positions better, thus making lifts easier for Agosto.

Belbin/Agosto began the 2008–2009 season at the 2008 Skate America and 2008 Cup of China, winning silver at both competitions. They withdrew from the 2008–2009 ISU Grand Prix Final after the original dance due to a back injury to Agosto. They withdrew from the 2009 U.S. Championships before the event began to due Agosto's injury. They were named to the team to the 2009 World Championships. At Worlds, they won the original dance and placed second in the compulsory and free dances to win the silver medal overall.

Belbin/Agosto won both their Grand Prix events in the 2009–10 season: the 2009 Cup of China and the 2009 Skate America. They withdrew from the Grand Prix Final for medical reasons. At the 2010 U.S. Championships, they were unable to reclaim their national title, finishing second behind Meryl Davis and Charlie White. Belbin/Agosto were nominated to represent the United States at the 2010 Winter Olympics. They finished 4th in the Olympic ice dancing event. They did not compete at the 2010 World Championships.

On June 10, 2010, Belbin and Agosto announced their retirement from eligible skating. Since then they have toured professionally in ice shows.

On December 15, 2015, U.S. Figure Skating announced Belbin and Agosto would be members of the U.S. Figure Skating Hall of Fame Class of 2016. The induction ceremony was held on January 22, 2016, at the 2016 U.S. Figure Skating Championships.

=== Later career ===
Agosto works as a coach and choreographer. He has choreographed for three Disney on Ice shows and in 2014, he became the director of ice dance at the Ice Den in Scottsdale, Arizona.

Agosto also worked as a voice actor for a video game in 2006, and expressed an interest in continuing in the field. He has performed on television as a spokesperson for the United States Census.

== Programs ==
(with Belbin)

Season	Original dance	Free dance	Exhibition
2009–2010	Moldavian folk dance: Moldovaneska	Ave Maria by Vladimir Vavilov performed by Sumi Jo; Amen from Stabat Mater by Gioachino Rossini	If It Kills Me performed by Jason Mraz
2008–2009	Stepping Out by John Kander, Fred Ebb	Tosca by Giacomo Puccini	Falling Slowly; Bleeding Love by Leona Lewis
2007–2008	Cotton Eyed Joe; Country Waltz; Appalachian Hoedown by Bluegrass	Selections by Frédéric Chopin arranged by Joseph Le Duca	Let's Get Loud by Jennifer Lopez; SexyBack; My Love by Justin Timberlake
2006–2007	Concierto Para Quinteto; Oblivion by Astor Piazzolla	Amélie by Yann Tiersen; Overture from That's Entertainment!	Let's Get Loud by Jennifer Lopez
2005–2006	Salsa Con Coco by Pochy y Su Cocoband; Let's Get Loud by Jennifer Lopez	Bulenas; Jaleo by Luis Winsberg; Duende by Esteban	Green Acres; American Woman; La Rosa; Let's Get Loud by Jennifer Lopez
2004–2005	Charleston: Cabaret; Slow Foxtrot: New York, New York; Quickstep: Cabaret	Russian gypsy dance: Shadritsa	Green Acres
2003–2004	Jitterbug: 5 months, 2 weeks, 2 days by Louis Prima; Blues: Give me Some Money Too by Leni Hester; Swing: Hey Pachuco by Royal Crown Revue	West Side Story by Leonard Bernstein	Elvis Presley medley; Green Acres
2002–2003	Waltz: Libiamo ne' lieti calici (from La traviata) by Giuseppe Verdi; Polka: Jolly Robbers by Franz von Suppé	Heartbreak Hotel; Hound Dog; Jailhouse Rock; Teddy Bear by Elvis Presley	Elvis Presley medley (modified FD)
2001–2002	Flamenco (from The Mask of Zorro) by James Horner; A Los Amigos	Sarajevo by Goran Bregović	Oscar Tango
2000–2001	Foxtrot: More by Nat King Cole; Quickstep: Girls, Girls, Girls	Alexandros by Staminis Spanudikis	Une Vie d'Amour
1999–2000		The Four Seasons by Antonio Vivaldi	Une Vie d'Amour

== Competitive highlights ==
=== With Belbin ===
Results
International
Event	1999–00	2000–01	2001–02	2002–03	2003–04	2004–05	2005–06	2006–07	2007–08	2008–09	2009–10
Olympics							2nd				4th
Worlds		17th	13th	7th	5th	2nd	3rd	3rd	4th	2nd	
Four Continents			2nd	2nd	1st	1st	1st	2nd			
Grand Prix Final					3rd	2nd		WD	2nd	WD	WD
GP Cup of China						1st		2nd	1st	2nd	1st
GP Cup of Russia					2nd			1st			
GP Lalique			6th	3rd	4th						
GP Skate America			5th	3rd	1st	1st	1st		1st	2nd	1st
Goodwill Games			5th								
Nebelhorn							1st				
International: Junior
Junior Worlds	3rd	2nd	1st								
JGP Final	4th	1st									
JGP Canada	1st										
JGP Germany		1st									
JGP Japan	2nd										
JGP Mexico		1st									
National
U.S. Champ.	1st J.	2nd	2nd	2nd	1st	1st	1st	1st	1st	WD	2nd
Team events
World Team										1T / 1P	
GP = Grand Prix; JGP = Junior Grand Prix; J. = Junior level; WD = Withdrew; T = Team result; P = Personal result; Medals awarded for team result only.

=== With Hill ===
International
Event	1997–1998
JS Bulgaria	7th
JS Slovakia	10th
National
U.S. Championships	7th J.

== See also ==
- List of Puerto Ricans - Sports
- List of select Jewish figure skaters
- List of Jewish Olympic medalists
