= Grethe Grünberg =

Estonian ice dancer

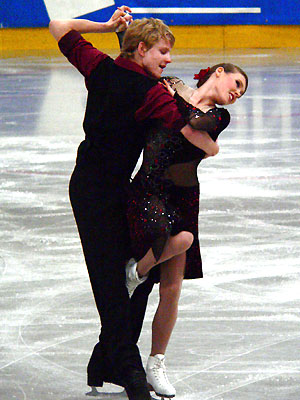
- Grünberg and Rand in 2006.

Personal information
- Born: 17 December 1988 (age 37) Tallinn, then part of Estonian SSR, Soviet Union
- Height: 1.62 m (5 ft 4 in)

Figure skating career
- Country: Estonia
- Partner: Kristjan Rand
- Coach: Igor Shpilband, Marina Zueva, Lea Rand
- Skating club: FSC Jääkild Tallinn
- Began skating: 1992
- Retired: 2008

Grethe Grünberg (born 17 December 1988) is an Estonian former ice dancer. With partner Kristjan Rand, she is the 2007 World Junior silver medalist and the 2005–2007 Estonian national champion.

== Career ==
Grünberg began learning to skate in 1992. She teamed up with Kristjan Rand a few years later.

Grünberg/Rand debuted on the ISU Junior Grand Prix series in 2002, placing 12th in Germany. In 2004, they made their first appearance at the World Junior Championships, finishing 18th.

At the 2005 Tallinn Cup, Grünberg/Rand became the first Estonian ice dancers to win a JGP medal, bronze. They were 9th at the 2006 World Junior Championships.

In the 2006–07 season, Grünberg/Rand won gold and silver at their two JGP events and qualified for the ISU Junior Grand Prix Final where they placed 5th. They won the silver medal at the 2007 World Junior Championships, behind Ekaterina Bobrova / Dmitri Soloviev and ahead of Kaitlyn Weaver / Andrew Poje. It was Estonia's first medal at an ISU Championships. Grünberg/Rand made their senior international debut in the same season, finishing 15th at the 2007 European Championships and 19th at the 2007 World Championships.

The duo missed the 2007–2008 skating season due to injury. Grünberg eventually retired due to injury.

== Programs ==
with Rand

Season	Original dance	Free dance
2006–2007	Quejas de Bandoneon	Operettas by Emmerich Kálmán
2005–2006	Cha cha; Rhumba; Cha cha	Bublichki
2004–2005	Slow foxtrot; Quickstep	French Kiss by James Newton Howard; La Vie en rose; French Kiss
2003–2004	Jitterbug: Pennsylvania 6-5000; Blues: Moonlight Serenade; Jitterbug: In the Mood by Glenn Miller	French Kiss by James Newton Howard; La Vie en rose; French Kiss

== Results ==
JGP: Junior Grand Prix

with Rand

International
Event	00–01	01–02	02–03	03–04	04–05	05–06	06–07
World Champ.							19th
European Champ.							15th
International: Junior
World Junior Champ.				18th	15th	9th	2nd
JGP Final							5th
JGP Bulgaria				6th		4th	
JGP Czech Republic				6th			
JGP Estonia						3rd	
JGP France					9th		
JGP Germany			12th				
JGP Netherlands							2nd
JGP Norway							1st
JGP Serbia					6th		
Pavel Roman			5th J		2nd J		
EYOF			12th J				
National
Estonian Champ.	5th	5th	2nd	2nd	1st	1st	1st
J = Junior level
