= Alex and Maia Shibutani =

American ice dancers

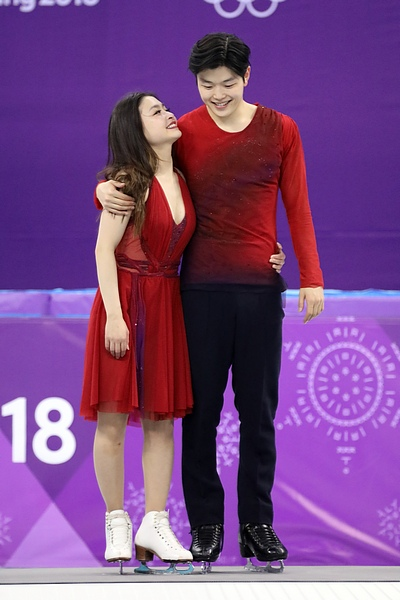
- The Shibutanis in 2018

Figure skating career
- Country: United States
- Discipline: Ice dance
- Began skating: 2004
- Highest WS: 2nd (2016–17)
Event	Gold medal – first place	Silver medal – second place	Bronze medal – third place
Olympic Games	0	0	2
World Championships	0	1	2
Four Continents Championships	1	2	1
Grand Prix Final	0	0	2
U.S. Championships	2	4	2
World Junior Championships	0	1	0
Junior Grand Prix Final	0	0	1
Medal list
Olympic Games
Bronze medal – third place	2018 Pyeongchang	Ice dance
Bronze medal – third place	2018 Pyeongchang	Team
World Championships
Silver medal – second place	2016 Boston	Ice dance
Bronze medal – third place	2011 Moscow	Ice dance
Bronze medal – third place	2017 Helsinki	Ice dance
Four Continents Championships
Gold medal – first place	2016 Taipei	Ice dance
Silver medal – second place	2011 Taipei	Ice dance
Silver medal – second place	2017 Gangneung	Ice dance
Bronze medal – third place	2015 Seoul	Ice dance
Grand Prix Final
Bronze medal – third place	2016–17 Marseille	Ice dance
Bronze medal – third place	2017–18 Nagoya	Ice dance
U.S. Championships
Gold medal – first place	2016 Saint Paul	Ice dance
Gold medal – first place	2017 Kansas City	Ice dance
Silver medal – second place	2011 Greensboro	Ice dance
Silver medal – second place	2012 San Jose	Ice dance
Silver medal – second place	2015 Greensboro	Ice dance
Silver medal – second place	2018 San Jose	Ice dance
Bronze medal – third place	2013 Omaha	Ice dance
Bronze medal – third place	2014 Boston	Ice dance
World Junior Championships
Silver medal – second place	2009 Sofia	Ice dance
Junior Grand Prix Final
Bronze medal – third place	2009–10 Tokyo	Ice dance

Alex and Maia Shibutani are American competitive ice dancers. They are two-time Olympic bronze medalists (2018 team and individual ice dance events), three-time World medalists (silver in 2016; bronze in 2011 and 2017), 2016 Four Continents champions, two-time U.S. national champions (2016, 2017) and are members of the U.S. Figure Skating Hall of Fame (first ballot inductees, 2023). They are two-time members of the U.S. Olympic team competing at the 2014 Winter Olympics in Sochi, Russia (second youngest team in the field) and the 2018 Winter Olympics in Pyeongchang, South Korea.

The Shibutanis have made history in their sport on multiple occasions. In 2018, they become the first ice dancers of Asian (non-white) descent to win medals at the Olympics. Their US national titles and ISU Grand Prix series and championship titles and medals were also historic firsts for athletes of Asian descent in the discipline of ice dance. Alex became the first male figure skater of Asian descent to be inducted into the U.S. Figure Skating Hall of Fame. They are the second sibling duo to share an Olympic medal as partners in ice dance, and the first from the United States. Their bronze medal at the 2011 World Figure Skating Championships is the highest result for an American team during their debut season at the World championships, and at 16 and 20 years of age, they became the second youngest team to earn world medals in the history of the sport.

As competitors at the senior level, the Shibutanis (Alex and Maia) were the first team in history to earn medals at both of their events during their rookie season, and have won six titles on the Grand Prix circuit. At the junior level, they earned the silver medal at the 2009 World Junior Figure Skating Championships (their debut season competing internationally), captured a bronze medal at the 2009–10 JGP Final, and during their four competitive outings over two years on the Junior Grand Prix circuit, earned three gold and one silver medal. From 2005 through 2018, they stood on the podium for 14 consecutive years at the U.S. National Figure Skating Championships (at all 5 competitive levels, including 8 consecutive years at the senior level).

The Shibutani siblings are often referred to by their nickname, the ShibSibs.

== Career ==
=== Early career ===
==== 2004–2005 season ====
Maia and Alex Shibutani teamed up to compete in ice dance in the spring of 2004. Their singles coach, Kathy Bird, arranged for them to work with their first dance coaches Andy Stroukoff and Susie Kelley. Additional coaches included Mary Marchiselli and choreographer, Josh Babb. During their first season of competition, they competed on the juvenile level. A gold medal at the 2005 North Atlantic Regional Championships, earned them qualification for the U.S. Junior Championships where they won the silver medal.

==== 2005–2006 season ====
After moving up to the intermediate level and performing well at the non-qualifying competitions, the Shibutanis went to Colorado Springs, Colorado, to work with choreographer Tom Dickson. During that off-season, they were being coached by Judy Blumberg on the east coast. After doing better than expected at the Lake Placid Ice Dance Competition in the summer of 2005, the Shibutanis decided to move coaching centers to a better training environment and so moved to train in Colorado Springs under head coach Patti Gottwein. During that time, they also worked with Rich Griffin, Damon Allen, and Eric Schulz.

Alex Shibutani changed his club representation to the Broadmoor Skating Club. The Shibutanis won the Southwestern Regional Championships, their qualifying competition for the 2006 U.S. Junior Championships. At the 2006 U.S. Junior Championships, they placed second in the first compulsory dance and then won the second compulsory and free dances to win the title overall. They worked as guest bloggers and aides for the media staff for U.S. Figure Skating at the 2006 U.S. Championships, and again at the 2006 Four Continents, which were held in Colorado Springs.

==== 2006–2007 season ====
The Shibutanis moved up to the novice level, which is the first of the three levels that compete at the U.S. Championships. Strong results at the Lake Placid Ice Dance Championships, including first place in the Novice Free Dance event, earned them their first opportunity to compete internationally under the ISU Judging System. At the North American Challenge event in Burnaby, British Columbia, they were the highest placing Americans in the novice event, pulling up from fifth place after the compulsory to second overall.

At the 2007 Midwestern Sectional Championships, their qualifying competition for the national championships, the Shibutanis placed second in the first compulsory dance and then won the second compulsory and the free dances to win the competition overall and qualify for the 2007 U.S. Championships. At US Nationals, the Shibutanis placed second in both compulsory dances, but with a win in the free dance were able to capture the novice gold medal by a margin of victory . This was their second consecutive national title.

Following the 2007 U.S. Championships, the Shibutanis relocated once again, moving to Michigan to be coached by Marina Zueva and Igor Shpilband at the Arctic Edge Arena in Canton, Michigan. An important factor in the decision to relocate their training based included the opportunity to live and train in an area which could provide access to both world class ice dance coaching, as well as excellent educational opportunities. Alex Shibutani, at the time of the coaching change, had two years left of high school and was considering his university options.

=== Junior level ===
==== 2007–2008 season ====
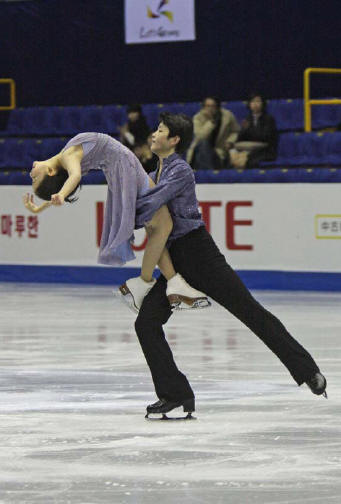
The Shibutanis perform a lift at the 2008–2009 Junior Grand Prix Final

The Shibutanis moved up to the junior level nationally. However, they were unable to compete internationally on the junior level because Maia was not yet old enough. At the 2008 Midwestern Sectionals, the Shibutanis placed fourth in the compulsory dance and then third in the original and free dances to win the bronze medal overall. This medal qualified them for the 2008 U.S. Championships. At Nationals, they placed 7th in the compulsory dance, 2nd in the original dance, and 4th in the free dance. They placed 4th overall, winning the pewter medal.

==== 2008–2009 season: World Junior silver & two Junior Grand Prix medals ====
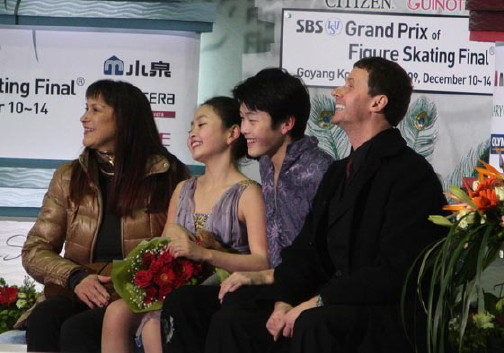
Alex & Maia Shibutani with coaches Igor Shpilband and Marina Zueva in 2008.

Maia Shibutani became age-eligible to compete on the international junior circuit. The siblings made their junior international debut on the ISU Junior Grand Prix (JGP). At their first event, the 2008–09 ISU Junior Grand Prix event in Courchevel, France, they placed second in the compulsory dance and then won the original and free dances to win the gold medal overall by a margin of victory of 11.00 points over silver medalists Kharis Ralph and Asher Hill. They were then assigned to their second event, the event in Madrid, Spain. At this event, they placed second in all three segments of the competition and won the silver medal. These two medals qualified them for the 2008–2009 ISU Junior Grand Prix Final, for which they were the third-ranked qualifiers. Qualifying for the event had also qualified them for the 2009 U.S. Championships.

The Junior Grand Prix Final was held concurrently with the senior final for the first time and so did not have a compulsory dance segment. The Shibutanis placed 7th in the original dance and 3rd in the free dance, finishing in 4th place overall.

The Shibutanis went on to the 2009 U.S. Championships, where they competed on the junior level for the second consecutive year. At the event, the Shibutanis placed second in the compulsory dance, the original dance, and the free dance. They won the silver medal overall marking their fifth consecutive podium finish at a national-level competition. Following the competition, the Shibutanis were named to the team to the 2009 World Junior Championships.

At Junior Worlds, the Shibutanis placed 5th in the compulsory dance, 4th in the original dance, and 2nd in the free dance. At the ages of 14 and 17, they won the silver medal.

==== 2009–2010 season: Junior Grand Prix Final bronze ====
For the 2009–2010 season, the Shibutanis continued to compete at the junior level, as Maia at just 15, remained age-ineligible to compete on the senior level internationally. On the Junior Grand Prix series, the Shibutanis won gold medals at both their JGP events - in Lake Placid, New York, and in Zagreb, Croatia. At the JGP Final in Tokyo, Japan, they won the bronze medal. At the 2010 US Nationals, competing for their third and final time at the junior level, they won the Junior ice dance title. At the 2010 Junior Worlds, their final junior event after having competed for only two seasons on the international circuit, they finished just off the podium in fourth place. This was their final junior event.

=== Senior level ===
==== 2010–2011 season: World bronze, Four Continents silver & two Grand Prix medals ====
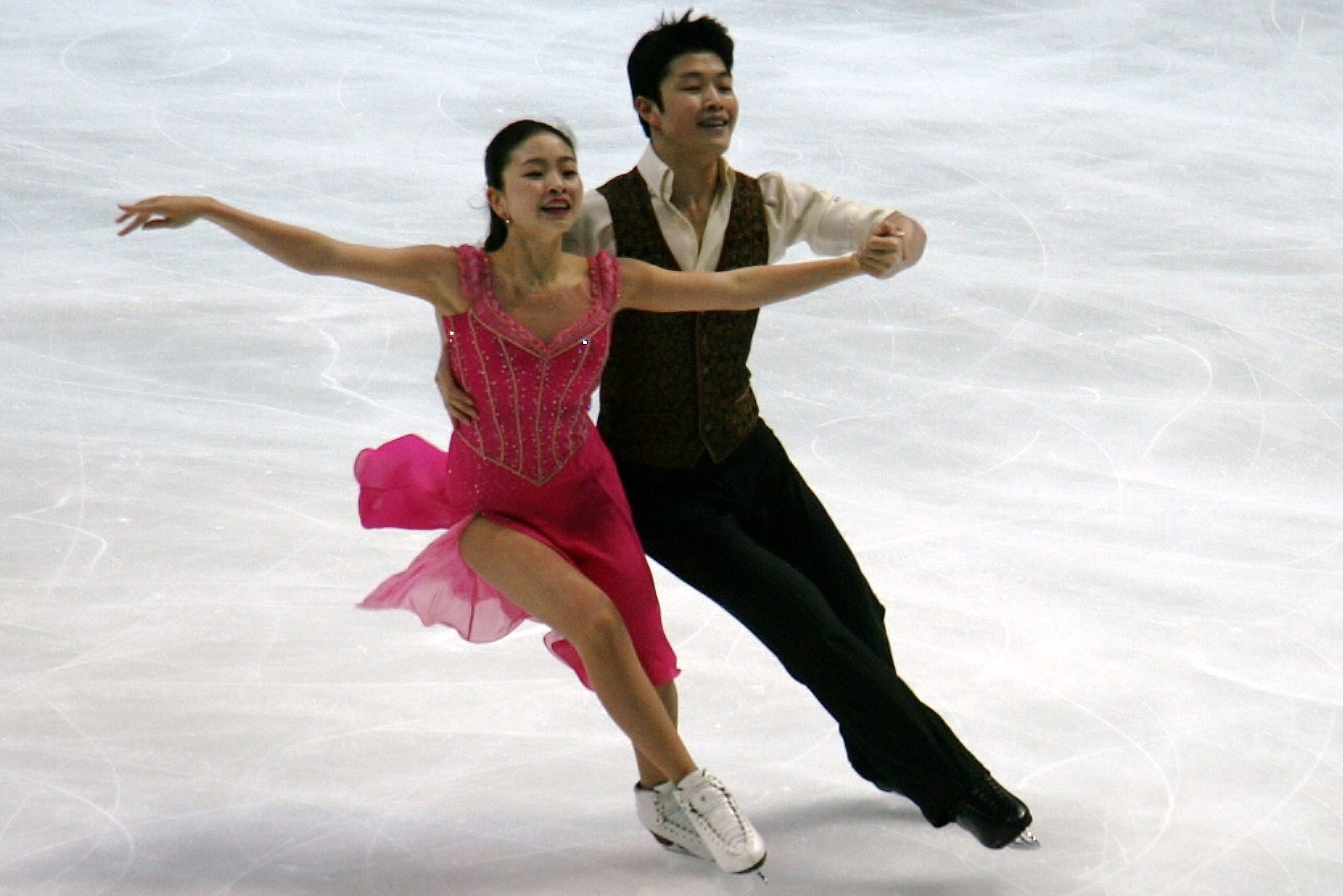
The Shibutanis at the 2011 Worlds

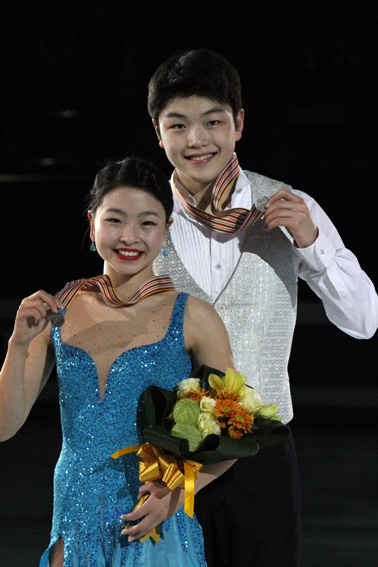
The Shibutanis in 2011

At the ages of 16 and 19, the Shibutanis advanced to the senior level and experienced a historic rookie season. At their senior international debut, they finished fifth at the 2010 Nebelhorn Trophy, moving up from eighth after the short dance with a strong free dance showing. They won the bronze medal at both the 2010 NHK Trophy (pulling up from 5th place after the short dance) and the 2010 Skate America (pulling up from fourth place after the short dance), making them the first dance team to medal at both Grand Prix events in its first senior season. They were the first alternates for the Grand Prix final.

The Shibutanis finished second at U.S. Nationals (behind Meryl Davis and Charlie White) and were chosen to compete at the Four Continents and World Championships. At their first ISU Championship event as senior competitors, the 2011 Four Continents championships, they once again finished just behind Davis and White, earning a silver medal. Maia and Alex Shibutani became the first figure skaters of Asian descent in the history of the sport to medal in ice dance at an ISU championship event. At the World Championships, they were in fourth after the short dance, 4.09 points behind third-placed Nathalie Péchalat / Fabian Bourzat. In the free dance, they scored 4.34 ahead of Pechalat and Bourzat, both of whom had fallen. The Shibutanis finished third overall by 0.25 points and won a bronze in their World Championships debut, a feat not even Tessa Virtue and Scott Moir, the current Olympic Champions, had accomplished. Their bronze medal finish remains the highest world championship debut of any US ice dance team in history. At the ages of 16 and 20, they were also the youngest world medalists in the discipline of ice dance in over 50 years.

==== 2011–2012 season: Two Grand Prix medals ====
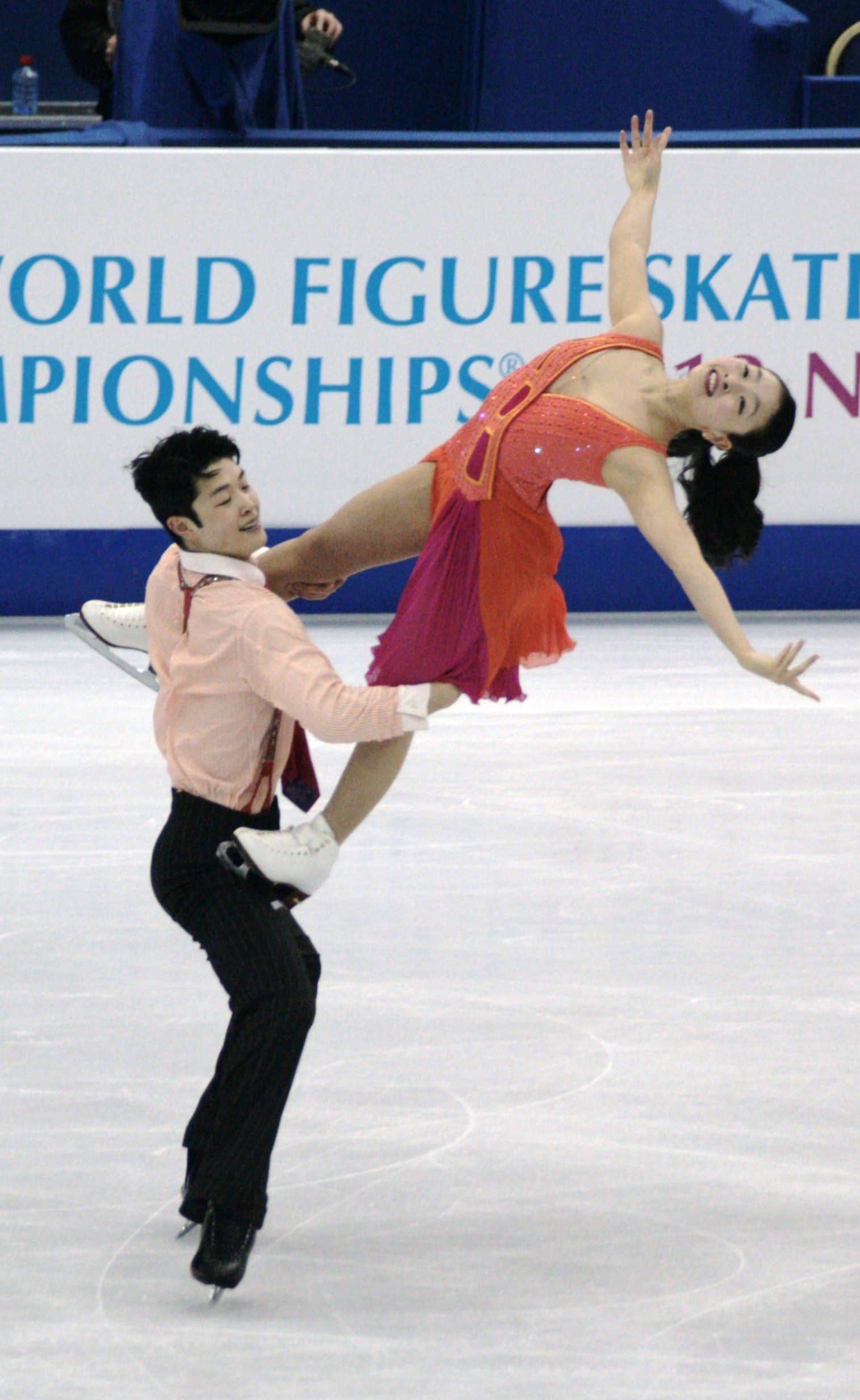
Maia and Alex Shibutani at the 2012 World Figure Skating Championships

The Shibutanis started their season with a silver medal at the 2011 Finlandia Trophy. Beginning their Grand Prix season, they won silver at the 2011 Cup of China. A week later they placed first at the 2011 NHK Trophy, edging Kaitlyn Weaver and Andrew Poje for gold by 0.09 points. It was the Shibutanis' first senior Grand Prix title. Their combined results qualified them for the Grand Prix Final.

At the 2012 US National championships, the Shibutanis repeated as the silver medalists behind Davis and White. The Shibutanis finished 4th at the 2012 Four Continents, an event during which Alex competed in the free dance while extremely ill, and 8th at the 2012 World Championships.

During the off-season, they were invited by Secretary of State Hillary Clinton, to attend a dinner in honor of Japanese Prime Minister Yoshihiko Noda on May 1, 2012, in Washington, D.C.

Following Igor Shpilband's dismissal from the Arctic Edge Arena in June 2012, the Shibutanis decided to remain at the rink with Marina Zoueva and ended their collaboration with Shpilband.

==== 2012–2013 season: Grand Prix bronze ====
The Shibutanis placed third in the short dance at the 2012 Rostelecom Cup. They paused their free dance for half a minute due to Alex pulling a muscle in his thigh. They were allowed to continue from the point of interruption and finished 4th overall behind Russian ice dancers Victoria Sinitsina and Ruslan Zhiganshin. They won the bronze medal at their next event, the 2012 NHK Trophy. The Shibutanis also took bronze at the 2013 U.S. Championships. They then competed at the 2013 Four Continents and finished 4th behind Madison Chock and Evan Bates. At the 2013 World Championships, the Shibutanis finished 8th.

==== 2013–2014 season: First Olympics & two Grand Prix medals ====
The Shibutanis began their season with another injury which forced them to withdraw from the US Classic in September. They began their competitive season by winning bronze medals at 2013 Skate America and 2013 NHK Trophy. They then went on to win the bronze medal at the 2014 U.S. Championships and were named in the U.S. team to the 2014 Winter Olympics in Sochi, Russia. They placed 9th at the Olympics. The Shibutanis also competed at the 2014 World Championships, where they placed 6th.

==== 2014–2015 season: Four Continents bronze & two Grand Prix medals ====
The Shibutanis started their season by winning the gold medal at the 2014 Ondrej Nepela Trophy. Combined with their gold medal at the 2014 Ice Challenge they were the top finishers in the 2014-2015 ISU Challenge Cup series. They then won the silver medal at the 2014 Skate America. They then went on to compete at their second Grand Prix event, 2014 Cup of China, where they won the silver medal. Their results on the Grand Prix series qualified them for the 2014–15 Grand Prix Final, where they placed 4th.

At the 2015 U.S. Championships, the duo won the silver medal behind Madison Chock and Evan Bates. They then went on to compete at the 2015 Four Continents Championships and the 2015 World Championships where they placed 3rd and 5th, respectively.

==== 2015–2016 season: World silver, Four Continents champion & two Grand Prix medals ====
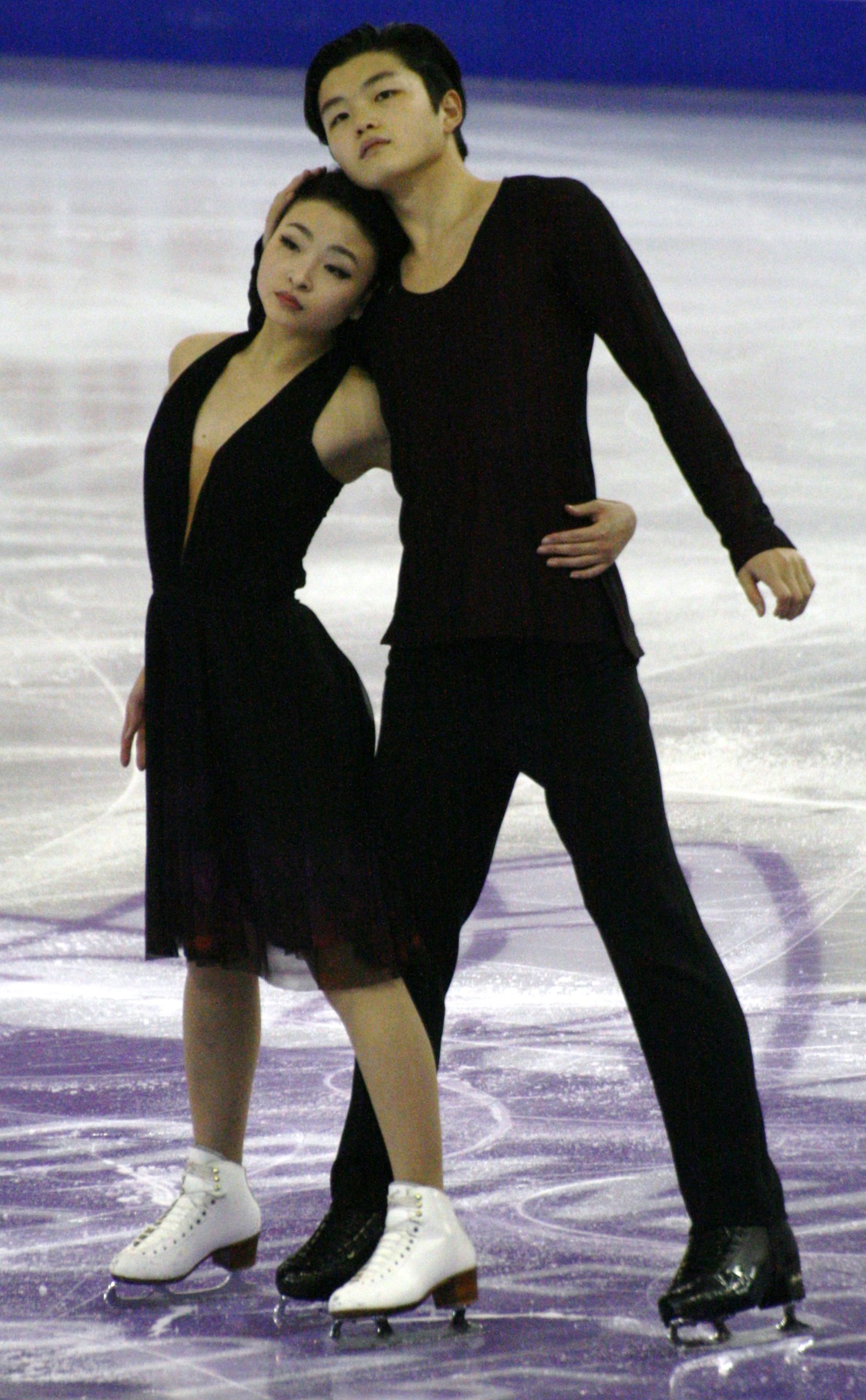
Maia and Alex Shibutani at the 2015 Grand Prix Final

The Shibutanis began their season by winning the bronze medal at 2015 Ondrej Nepela Trophy. On the Grand Prix circuit, they earned standing ovations for Fix You, their Coldplay free dance. They won the silver medal at 2015 Skate Canada International and the gold medal at the 2015 NHK Trophy, for their second career Grand Prix event title.

They qualified for the 2015–16 Grand Prix Final as the fourth ranked team based on qualification criteria that had been modified in an attempt to account for the partially cancelled Trophee Bompard event. Their combined short dance and free dance score from NHK Trophy of 174.43 points was the highest total score amongst all competitors during the Grand Prix season. At the Grand Prix Final event, they placed 4th in the short dance. The night before the free dance, Alex became severely ill with food poisoning. They chose to compete nonetheless, and managed to get another standing ovation for their free dance. They finished 4th in the free dance and 4th overall. They withdrew from the exhibition so that Alex could recover.

At the 2016 U.S. Championships, the Shibutanis placed second behind Madison Chock and Evan Bates during the short dance, but moved up following the free dance to win their first senior US title. They earned standing ovations from the audience at both segments of the competition.

The Shibutanis next competed at the 2016 Four Continents Championships. They set personal bests and finished first in both segments of the competition for their first ISU Championship title. With this title, they became the first ice dancers of Asian descent to win an ISU ice dance championship event.

The Shibutanis ended their season at the 2016 World Figure Skating Championships. There, they set new personal bests and finished second in both segments of the competition for their second world medal.

==== 2016–2017 season: World bronze, Four Continents silver & first Grand Prix Final medal ====
The Shibutanis began the 2016–17 season with a gold medal at the Skate America Grand Prix in Chicago. They followed that with another victory at the Cup of China Grand Prix event held in Beijing, once again qualifying for the Grand Prix of Figure Skating Final. At the Grand Prix Final event in Marseille, France, the Shibutanis were ranked second after the short dance, placing behind Tessa Virtue and Scott Moir from Canada, and ahead of reigning World champions, Gabriella Papadakis and Guillaume Cizeron. A third-place finishing the free dance portion of the competition placed them third place overall - the bronze medal being their first medal at a Grand Prix Final.

At the 2017 U.S. Championships, the Shibutanis won their second national title; they edged out Chock/Bates by 1.01 points after placing first in the short dance and second in the free dance. The siblings took silver at the 2017 Four Continents in Gangneung (South Korea), having ranked second in both segments to Canada's Virtue/Moir.

At the 2017 World Championships in Helsinki (Finland), they ranked fifth in the short dance and fourth in the free dance, ending up third overall by a margin of 0.37 over Canada's Weaver/Poje. The siblings received their third world medal, bronze.

==== 2017–2018 season: Two Olympic bronze medals & Grand Prix Final bronze ====
The Shibutanis made their season debut at the 2017 Rostelecom Cup. They scored 77.30 in the short dance and 111.94 in the free dance to place first in both segments and won the gold medal, with 189.24 points. At their second GP event, 2017 Skate America, they again won both the short and free dance for a total of 194.25 and first place overall, qualifying for the Grand Prix Final in Nagoya. At the Grand Prix Final, they earned a second consecutive bronze medal.

At the 2018 U.S. Figure Skating Championships, the Shibutanis placed first in the short dance and third in the free dance, placing them second overall behind Madison Hubbell and Zachary Donohue.

They returned to the Winter Olympics in 2018, considered as favorites for a medal in the ice dance event. They performed both the short and free dance in the team figure skating event, helping Team USA win the bronze medal. The Shibutanis later beat fellow Americans Madison Hubbell and Zachary Donohue for the bronze medal in ice dancing. Maia and Alex received a short dance score of 77.73, a free dance score of 114.86, and a total score of 192.59. They were the only Americans to medal in their individual event. “This was an incredible ice dance event, and to know we gave it our very best, means everything,” said Maia. “It feels like gold,” added Alex of the bronze medal. “It’s unbelievable. I am so proud of the way we fought through this week and the season.”

The Shibutanis chose to not compete at the 2018 World Championships and retired shortly after.

==== 2025–2026 season: Comeback ====
On May 1, 2025, the Shibutanis announced their intent to return to competition. Maia stated: “These past seven years have helped us grow. I’m so grateful to be healthy and in a position to make the decision to return to the sport I love in this way.”

In early October 2025, a video of the Shibutanis during a training session was leaked online. The video showed Alex berating and yelling at Maia for eleven minutes, including calling her an "idiot." The siblings addressed the video during an interview with the Associated Press the following month. Alex said, "Unfortunately, I lost my temper in training and it shouldn’t have happened. I apologized to Maia right after our practice. The intensity of what we are trying to do and the standards that we have, the two of us, we both understand (the outburst) but it was wrong and I am committed to being a better teammate. I’m so lucky to skate with Maia. We have a very unique, special relationship and we are committed to each other and to this process." Maia also defended Alex, adding, "When you are working toward being your best there are going to be intense moments, but for us we understand each other and the process and we work through it together like siblings do. We continued practicing that day and we choose each other every time."

In November, the team competed at 2025 NHK Trophy where they placed sixth overall. "I’d say that we’ve grown and lived so much life outside of the sport,” said Maia after the free dance. "But to still be able to capture and meet the moment the way that we did for this very special audience is something that I will always remember." "It’s taken so much work to get to this point, and we believe in ourselves, which is why we’re here," Alex added. "We’ve always believed that we have what it takes and we have each other."

Two weeks later, the Shibutanis placed fifth at 2025 Finlandia Trophy. "We value performing here in Helsinki just as much as we value competing at an Olympic Games," said Alex. "Because our perspective over the past seven years has given us a deep sense of appreciation for the opportunity to perform. We missed doing that together. We missed the environment."

In early January, it was announced that the Shibutanis had discarded their ShibSibs x Shibuya Medley rhythm dance with the intention of presenting a new program to the song "Canned Heat" by Jamiroquai. Going on to compete at the 2026 U.S. Championships, the team finished in ninth place overall.

== Programs ==
Season	Original dance	Free dance	Exhibition
2006–2007	unknown	Memoirs of a Geisha by John Williams	
2007–2008	Japanese Kodo music	Piano music by Jean-Marie Senia	
2008–2009	Miss Pettigrew Lives for a Day by Paul Englishby	Cinema Paradiso by Ennio Morricone	Japanese Kodo music
2009–2010	Itsuka Mata by Tetsuro Naito; Ao-ki Kaze by Ryutaro Kaneko	Tango Rhapsody by Luis Bacalov; La Vie en Rose by Louiguy	La Vie en rose by Louis Armstrong
	Short dance		
2010–2011	The Carousel Waltz by Richard Rodgers	Smile (from Modern Times) by Charlie Chaplin; Let's Face the Music and Dance by Irving Berlin	The Prayer by Charlotte Church, Josh Groban; La Vie en rose by Louis Armstrong
2011–2012	Samba: Batuca by DJ Dero; Samba: The Girl From Ipanema by Olivia; Samba: Samba de Janeiro by Bellini; Batuca by DJ Dero; Skip to the Bip by Club des Belugas; Jazz Machine by Black Machine	Sun Valley Serenade by Glenn Miller Orchestra; In the Mood; Moonlight Serenade; Chattanooga Choo Choo	The Prayer by Charlotte Church, Josh Groban
2012–2013	March: Ojos Azul; Waltz: Dolencias; Polka: Sikureada by Incantations; Waltz and polka: Mary Poppins Overture by Richard and Robert Sherman	Memoirs of a Geisha by John Williams	Anything You Can Do (I Can Do Better) (from Annie Get Your Gun); Lost by Michael Bublé
2013–2014	Michael Bublé medley: Foxtrot; Quickstep; Foxtrot	Wanna Be Startin' Somethin'; Man in the Mirror; Thriller by Michael Jackson; Wanna Be Startin' Somethin' by Michael Jackson; Ben by Walter Scharf; Thriller by Michael Jackson	I Lived by OneRepublic
2014–2015	Flamenco: Asturias Variations by Isaac Albéniz; Paso Doble: The Last Corrida	Rosen aus dem Süden (Roses from the South); The Blue Danube by Johann Strauss II	O (Fly On) by Coldplay choreo by. Peter Tchernyshev
2015–2016	Waltz, march, waltz: Coppélia by Léo Delibes choreo. by Marina Zueva, Cheryl Yeager	Fix You; The Scientist by Coldplay choreo. by Peter Tchernyshev	Fix You by Coldplay choreo. by Peter Tchernyshev; Clair de Lune by Claude Debussy choreo. by Maia Shibutani, Alex Shibutani
2016–2017	Blues: That's Life by Dean Kay, Kelly Gordon covered by Frank Sinatra; Hip Hop: That's Life (remix) performed by Frank Sinatra, Jay-Z arranged by Ryan "Ryanimay" Conferido choreo. by Hokuto Konishi, Aye Hasegawa, Randi Strong, and others	Spiegel im Spiegel (Mirror in Mirror) by Arvo Pärt performed by Anne Akiko Meyers, Akira Eguchi; Truman Sleeps (from The Truman Show) by Philip Glass; The Departure (from The Leftovers) by Max Richter rearranged by Alex Shibutani performed by members of The San Francisco Symphony choreo. by Maia Shibutani, Alex Shibutani, Marina Zueva, Oleg Epstein, Massimo Scali and others	Do You Remember by Jarryd James choreo. by Stéphane Lambiel
2017–2018	Mambo: Mambo No. 5 by Pérez Prado; Cha Cha: Cherry Pink (and Apple Blossom White) by Louiguy performed by Pérez Prado; Samba: Mambo Jambo/Mambo No. 8 by Pérez Prado	Paradise by Coldplay	Fix You; Paradise by Coldplay; That's Life by Dean Kay, Kelly Gordon covered by Frank Sinatra; That's Life (remix) performed by Frank Sinatra, Jay-Z arranged by Ryan "Ryanimay" Conferido choreo. by Hokuto Konishi, Aye Hasegawa, Randi Strong, and others
2018–2019			Doin' It Right; Harder, Better, Faster, Stronger by Daft Punk choreo. by Jeffrey Buttle; Us Against the World; Life in Technicolor II by Coldplay choreo. by Maia Shibutani, Alex Shibutani
	Rhythm dance		
2025–2026	ShibSibs x Shibuya: A 90s Night in Tokyo; C.R.E.A.M. by Wu-Tang Clan; Let Me Clear My Throat by DJ Kool; B-BOY by Rhymester; Starting Race (from Mario Kart 64) by Kenta Nagata; Award Tour by A Tribe Called Quest; Stomp to My Beat by JS16; The Rhythm of the Night by Corona choreo. by Massimo Scali, Marina Zueva, Maia Shibutani, Alex Shibutani; Canned Heat by Jamiroquai choreo. by Massimo Scali, Marina Zueva, Maia Shibutani, Alex Shibutani	Fix You by Coldplay choreo. by Massimo Scali, Marina Zueva, Maia Shibutani, Alex Shibutani	Aqua by Ryuichi Sakamoto

== Competitive highlights ==
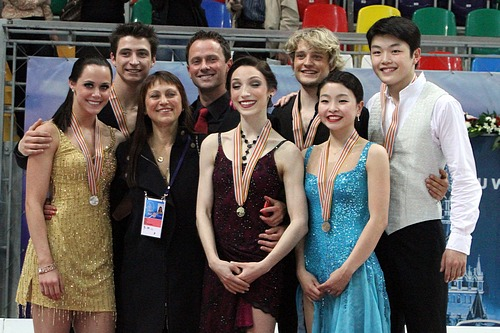
The Shibutanis with the other medalists and their coaches at the 2011 World Championships

- GP – Event of the ISU Grand Prix Series
- CS – Event of the ISU Challenger Series
- JGP – Event of the ISU Junior Grand Prix Series
- WD – Withdrew from competition

Competition placements at senior level
Season	2010–11	2011–12	2012–13	2013–14	2014–15	2015–16	2016–17	2017–18	2025–26
Winter Olympics				9th				3rd	
Winter Olympics (Team event)								3rd	
World Championships	3rd	8th	8th	6th	5th	2nd	3rd	WD	
Four Continents Championships	2nd	4th	4th		3rd	1st	2nd		
Grand Prix Final		5th			4th	4th	3rd	3rd	
U.S. Championships	2nd	2nd	3rd	3rd	2nd	1st	1st	2nd	9th
GP Cup of China		2nd			2nd		1st		
GP Finland									5th
GP NHK Trophy	3rd	1st	3rd	3rd		1st			6th
GP Rostelecom Cup			4th					1st	
GP Skate America	3rd			3rd	2nd		1st	1st	
GP Skate Canada						2nd			
CS Ice Challenge					1st				
CS Nepela Trophy					1st	3rd			
Finlandia Trophy		2nd							
Nebelhorn Trophy	5th								

Competition placements at junior level
Season	2007–08	2008–09	2009–10
World Junior Championships		2nd	4th
Junior Grand Prix Final		4th	3rd
U.S. Championships	4th	2nd	1st
JGP Croatia			1st
JGP France		1st	
JGP Spain		2nd	
JGP United States			1st

== Detailed results ==
- Small medals for the short program and free skating are only awarded at ISU Championships.
- At national events in the United States, pewter medals are awarded for fourth place.

=== Senior level ===
Results in the 2010–11 season
Date	Event	SD		FD		Total	
Date	Event	P	Score	P	Score	P	Score
Sep 23–26, 2010	(Germany) 2010 Nebelhorn Trophy	8	46.90	2	86.10	5	133.00
Oct 22–24, 2010	(Japan) 2010 NHK Trophy	5	53.68	2	83.25	3	136.93
Nov 12–14, 2010	(United States) 2010 Skate America	4	56.46	3	88.35	3	144.81
Jan 22–30, 2011	(United States) 2011 U.S. Championships	2	70.47	2	102.71	2	173.18
Feb 15–20, 2011	(Taiwan) 2011 Four Continents Championships	4	62.04	2	93.34	2	155.38
Apr 24 – May 1, 2011	(Russia) 2011 World Championships	4	66.88	3	96.91	3	163.79

Results in the 2011–12 season
Date	Event	SD		FD		Total	
Date	Event	P	Score	P	Score	P	Score
Oct 6–9, 2011	(Finland) 2011 Finlandia Trophy	2	58.45	2	92.63	2	151.08
Nov 3–6, 2011	2011 Cup of China	2	57.79	2	90.61	2	148.40
Nov 10–13, 2011	(Japan) 2011 NHK Trophy	3	59.02	1	92.83	1	151.85
Dec 8–11, 2011	(Canada) 2011–12 Grand Prix Final	5	65.53	5	95.02	5	160.55
Jan 22–29, 2012	(United States) 2012 U.S. Championships	2	72.61	2	106.23	2	178.84
Feb 7–12, 2012	(United States) 2012 Four Continents Championships	4	63.38	4	94.91	4	158.29
Mar 26 – Apr 1, 2012	(France) 2012 World Championships	7	62.35	11	82.37	8	144.72

Results in the 2012–13 season
Date	Event	SD		FD		Total	
Date	Event	P	Score	P	Score	P	Score
Nov 8–11, 2012	(Russia) 2012 Rostelecom Cup	4	58.26	5	82.65	4	140.91
Nov 23–25, 2012	(Japan) 2012 NHK Trophy	2	60.84	3	93.72	3	154.56
Jan 19–27, 2013	(United States) 2013 U.S. Championships	3	69.63	3	104.58	3	174.21
Feb 8–11, 2013	(Japan) 2013 Four Continents Championships	4	63.26	4	96.71	4	159.97
Mar 11–17, 2013	(Canada) 2013 World Championships	8	66.14	9	91.57	8	157.71

Results in the 2013–14 season
Date	Event	SD		FD		Total	
Date	Event	P	Score	P	Score	P	Score
Oct 18–20, 2013	(United States) 2013 Skate America	3	61.26	3	93.21	3	154.47
Nov 8–10, 2013	(Japan) 2013 NHK Trophy	3	63.09	3	94.49	3	157.58
Jan 5–12, 2014	(United States) 2014 U.S. Championships	3	68.00	3	102.44	3	170.44
Feb 16–17, 2014	(Russia) 2014 Winter Olympics	9	64.47	10	90.70	9	155.17
Mar 24–30, 2014	(Japan) 2014 World Championships	6	63.55	6	95.02	6	158.57

Results in the 2014–15 season
Date	Event	SD		FD		Total	
Date	Event	P	Score	P	Score	P	Score
Oct 1–5, 2014	(Slovakia) 2014 CS Ondrej Nepela Trophy	1	62.72	1	100.26	1	162.98
Oct 24–26, 2014	(United States) 2014 Skate America	2	64.14	2	96.19	2	160.33
Nov 7–9, 2014	2014 Cup of China	1	65.20	2	92.16	2	157.36
Nov 14–16, 2014	(Austria) 2014 CS Ice Challenge	1	65.38	1	100.96	1	166.34
Dec 11–14, 2014	(Spain) 2014–15 Grand Prix Final	3	63.90	6	95.04	4	158.94
Jan 18–25, 2015	(United States) 2015 U.S. Championships	2	73.84	2	107.47	2	181.31
Feb 9–15, 2015	(South Korea) 2015 Four Continents Championships	2	69.65	3	101.14	3	170.79
Mar 23–29, 2015	(China) 2015 World Championships	6	69.32	5	102.71	5	172.03

Results in the 2015–16 season
Date	Event	SD		FD		Total	
Date	Event	P	Score	P	Score	P	Score
Oct 1–3, 2015	(Slovakia) 2015 CS Ondrej Nepela Trophy	1	63.24	3	91.10	3	154.34
Oct 30 – Nov 1, 2015	2015 Skate Canada International	2	66.00	2	102.36	2	168.36
Nov 27–29, 2015	(Japan) 2015 NHK Trophy	1	68.08	1	106.35	1	174.43
Dec 10–13, 2015	(Spain) 2015–16 Grand Prix Final	4	69.11	4	105.81	4	174.92
Jan 15–24, 2016	(United States) 2016 U.S. Championships	2	74.67	1	115.47	1	190.14
Feb 16–21, 2016	(Taiwan) 2016 Four Continents Championships	1	72.86	1	108.76	1	181.62
Mar 28 – Apr 3, 2016	(United States) 2016 World Championships	2	74.70	2	113.73	2	188.43

Results in the 2016–17 season
Date	Event	SD		FD		Total	
Date	Event	P	Score	P	Score	P	Score
Oct 21–23, 2016	(United States) 2016 Skate America	1	73.04	1	112.71	1	185.75
Nov 18–20, 2016	2016 Cup of China	2	73.23	1	111.90	1	185.13
Dec 8–11, 2016	(France) 2016–17 Grand Prix Final	2	77.97	3	111.63	3	189.60
Jan 14–22, 2017	(United States) 2017 U.S. Championships	1	82.42	2	117.63	1	200.05
Feb 15–19, 2017	(South Korea) 2017 Four Continents Championships	2	76.59	2	115.26	2	191.85
Mar 29 – Apr 2, 2017	(Finland) 2017 World Championships	5	74.88	4	110.30	3	185.18

Results in the 2017–18 season
Date	Event	SD		FD		Total	
Date	Event	P	Score	P	Score	P	Score
Oct 20–22, 2017	(Russia) 2017 Rostelecom Cup	1	77.30	1	111.94	1	189.24
Nov 24–26, 2017	(United States) 2017 Skate America	1	79.18	1	115.07	1	194.25
Dec 7–10, 2017	(Japan) 2017–18 Grand Prix Final	3	78.09	6	109.91	3	188.00
Jan 5–7, 2018	(United States) 2018 U.S. Championships	1	82.33	3	114.60	2	196.93
Feb 9–12, 2018	(South Korea) 2018 Winter Olympics (Team event)	2	75.46	2	112.01	3	–
Feb 19–20, 2018	(South Korea) 2018 Winter Olympics	4	77.73	3	114.86	3	192.59

Results in the 2025–26 season
Date	Event	RD		FD		Total	
Date	Event	P	Score	P	Score	P	Score
Nov 7–9, 2025	(Japan) 2025 NHK Trophy	6	71.74	5	108.76	6	180.50
Nov 21–23, 2025	(Finland) 2025 Finlandia Trophy	5	71.99	6	113.69	5	185.68
Jan 4–11, 2026	(United States) 2026 U.S. Championships	10	71.24	10	101.93	9	173.17

=== Junior level ===
Results in the 2007–08 season
Date	Event	CD		OD		FD		Total	
Date	Event	P	Score	P	Score	P	Score	P	Score
Jan 20–27, 2008	(United States) 2008 U.S. Championships	7	27.66	2	52.32	4	77.82	4	157.80

Results in the 2008–09 season
Date	Event	CD		OD		FD		Total	
Date	Event	P	Score	P	Score	P	Score	P	Score
Aug 27–31, 2008	2008 JGP France	2	28.49	1	50.46	1	78.89	1	157.84
Sep 24–28, 2008	2008 JGP Spain	2	31.04	2	53.22	2	79.30	2	163.56
Dec 10–14, 2008	(South Korea) 2008–09 Junior Grand Prix Final	–	–	7	47.05	3	73.55	4	120.60
Jan 18–25, 2009	(United States) 2009 U.S. Championships	2	31.98	2	52.70	2	76.35	2	161.03
Feb 22 – Mar 1, 2009	(Bulgaria) 2009 World Junior Championships	5	29.71	4	52.10	2	80.34	2	162.15

Results in the 2009–10 season
Date	Event	CD		OD		FD		Total	
Date	Event	P	Score	P	Score	P	Score	P	Score
Sep 2–6, 2009	2009 JGP United States	1	34.09	1	56.35	1	85.51	1	175.95
Oct 7–11, 2009	2009 JGP Croatia	1	34.63	1	54.29	1	83.07	1	171.99
Dec 3–6, 2009	(Japan) 2009–10 Junior Grand Prix Final	–	–	2	55.21	3	83.54	3	138.75
Jan 15–23, 2010	(United States) 2010 U.S. Championships	1	35.72	1	56.17	1	88.80	1	180.69
Mar 9–13, 2010	(Netherlands) 2010 World Junior Championships	2	34.27	4	52.67	4	81.41	4	168.35
