= Kristjan Rand =

Estonian ice dancer

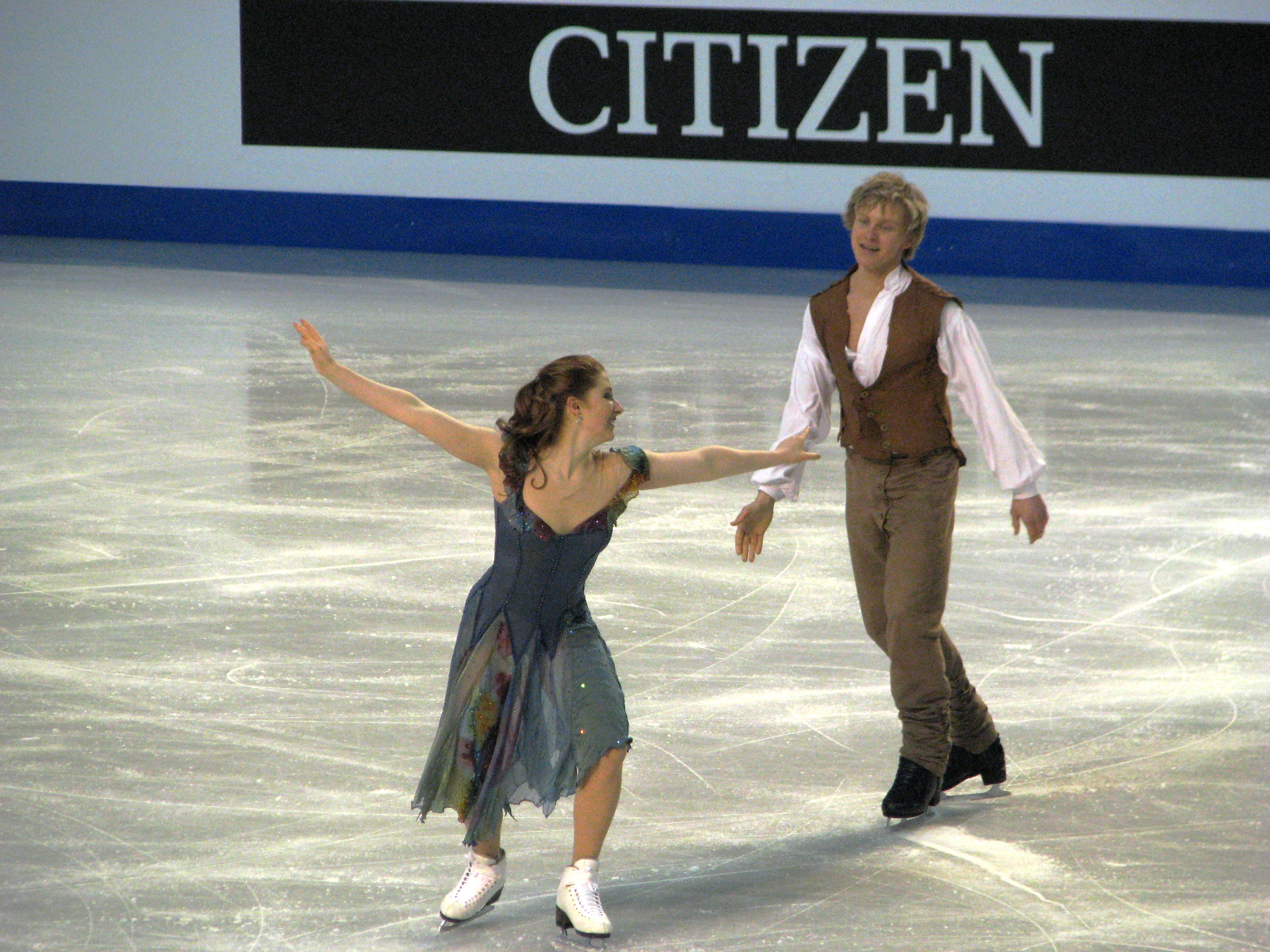
- Mallory and Rand at the 2010 European Championships

Personal information
- Born: 12 June 1987 (age 39) Tallinn, then part of Estonian SSR, Soviet Union
- Height: 1.75 m (5 ft 9 in)

Figure skating career
- Country: Estonia
- Partner: Caitlin Mallory, Grethe Grünberg
- Coach: Igor Shpilband, Marina Zueva, Lea Rand, Sergei Ponomarenko, Marina Klimova
- Skating club: Jääkild FSC Tallinn
- Began skating: 1992
- Retired: 2010

Kristjan (or Kristian) Rand (born 12 June 1987) is an Estonian former ice dancer. With Grethe Grünberg, he is the 2007 World Junior silver medalist and the 2005–2007 Estonian national champion. With Caitlin Mallory, he competed in the final segment at four ISU Championships.

== Personal life ==
Kristjan Rand was born on 12 June 1987 in Tallinn. He is the elder brother of Estonian ice dancer Taavi Rand. Their mother, Lea Rand, is an Estonian skating coach.

== Career ==
=== Partnership with Grünberg ===
Kristjan Rand began skating with Grethe Grünberg at the age of about eight years.

Grünberg/Rand debuted on the ISU Junior Grand Prix series in 2002, placing 12th in Germany. In 2004, they made their first appearance at the World Junior Championships, finishing 18th.

At the 2005 Tallinn Cup, Grünberg/Rand became the first Estonian ice dancers to win a JGP medal, bronze. They were 9th at the 2006 World Junior Championships.

In the 2006–07 season, Grünberg/Rand won gold and silver at their two JGP events and qualified for the ISU Junior Grand Prix Final where they placed 5th. They won the silver medal at the 2007 World Junior Championships, behind Ekaterina Bobrova / Dmitri Soloviev and ahead of Kaitlyn Weaver / Andrew Poje. It was Estonia's first medal at an ISU Championships. Grünberg/Rand made their senior international debut in the same season, finishing 15th at the 2007 European Championships and 19th at the 2007 World Championships.

After missing the 2007–2008 skating season, Grünberg decided to retire due to injury.

=== Partnership with Mallory ===
In 2008, Rand teamed up with American ice dancer Caitlin Mallory to compete for Estonia. They qualified to the free dance at both of their ISU Championships assignments, finishing 14th at the 2009 European Championships in Helsinki, Finland, and 20th at the 2009 World Championships in Los Angeles, California.

Early the following season, Mallory/Rand placed 9th at the 2009 Nebelhorn Trophy, giving Estonia a spot in the ice dancing event at the 2010 Winter Olympics in Vancouver. They placed 8th at their sole Grand Prix assignment, the 2009 Skate America. They did not compete in Canada because the Olympics, unlike other competitions, required both partners to be citizens of the country they were representing and Estonia did not allow dual nationality, meaning that Mallory would have to renounce her U.S. citizenship. She said, "we just realized it was too much of a sacrifice for one competition." Estonia's spot at the Olympics was used by Rand's brother and his partner. Mallory/Rand placed 13th at the 2010 European Championships in Tallinn, Estonia, and 17th at the 2010 World Championships in Turin, Italy.

The two missed the 2010–2011 season due to Rand's compulsory one-year military service but planned to return to competition. They did not compete again.

== Programs ==
=== With Mallory ===
| Season | Original dance | Free dance |
|---|---|---|
| 2009–2010 | Estonian folk dance: Mulgi Polka; Estonian Waltz; Mulgi Polka | Peer Gynt by Edvard Grieg |
| 2008–2009 | Ragtime (20s): Yes Sir, That's My Baby; Foxtrot (20s): Yes Sir, That's My Baby by Walter Donaldson; Charleston (20s) | Suite No. 3 Air; Toccata and Fugue in D minor, BWV 565 by Johann Sebastian Bach |

=== With Grünberg ===
| Season | Original dance | Free dance |
|---|---|---|
| 2006–2007 | Quejas de Bandoneon | Operettas by Emmerich Kálmán |
| 2005–2006 | Cha cha; Rhumba; Cha cha | Bublichki |
| 2004–2005 | Slow foxtrot; Quickstep | French Kiss by James Newton Howard; La Vie en rose; French Kiss |
| 2003–2004 | Jitterbug: Pennsylvania 6-5000; Blues: Moonlight Serenade; Jitterbug: In the Mood by Glenn Miller | French Kiss by James Newton Howard; La Vie en rose; French Kiss |

== Results ==
GP: Grand Prix; JGP: Junior Grand Prix

=== With Mallory ===
International
| Event | 2008–09 | 2009–10 |
|---|---|---|
| World Championships | 20th | 17th |
| European Championships | 14th | 13th |
| GP Skate America | | 8th |
| Finlandia Trophy | 4th | |
| Nebelhorn Trophy | | 9th |
| Schäfer Memorial | 6th | |

=== With Grünberg ===
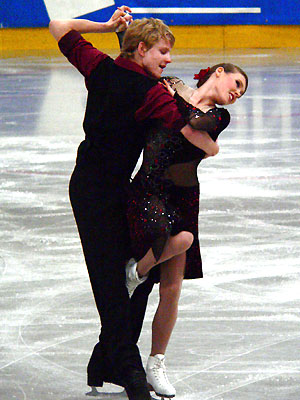
Grünberg and Rand in 2006

International
| Event | 00–01 | 01–02 | 02–03 | 03–04 | 04–05 | 05–06 | 06–07 |
|---|---|---|---|---|---|---|---|
| World Champ. | | | | | | | 19th |
| European Champ. | | | | | | | 15th |
International: Junior
| World Junior Champ. | | | | 18th | 15th | 9th | 2nd |
| JGP Final | | | | | | | 5th |
| JGP Bulgaria | | | | 6th | | 4th | |
| JGP Czech Republic | | | | 6th | | | |
| JGP Estonia | | | | | | 3rd | |
| JGP France | | | | | 9th | | |
| JGP Germany | | | 12th | | | | |
| JGP Netherlands | | | | | | | 2nd |
| JGP Norway | | | | | | | 1st |
| JGP Serbia | | | | | 6th | | |
| Pavel Roman | | | 5th J | | 2nd J | | |
| EYOF | | | 12th J | | | | |
National
| Estonian Champ. | 5th | 5th | 2nd | 2nd | 1st | 1st | 1st |
J = Junior level
