= Tatiana Gladkova =

Soviet ice dancer

Tatiana Deych, née Gladkova (Russian: Татьяна Гладкова) is a former competitive ice dancer who represented the Soviet Union. With her skating partner, Igor Shpilband, she won silver at the 1982 World Junior Championships in Oberstdorf, gold at the 1983 World Junior Championships in Sarajevo, and silver at the 1983 Golden Spin of Zagreb. Their coaches were Lyudmila Pakhomova and Gennady Akkerman.

Gladkova studied at the Moscow Institute of Physical Culture. In 2003, she joined the coaching staff at the Detroit Skating Club.

== Competitive highlights ==
(with Shpilband)

Event	1981–82	1982–83	1983–84
World Junior Championships	2nd	1st	
Golden Spin of Zagreb			2nd
