= Caitlin Mallory =

American ice dancer

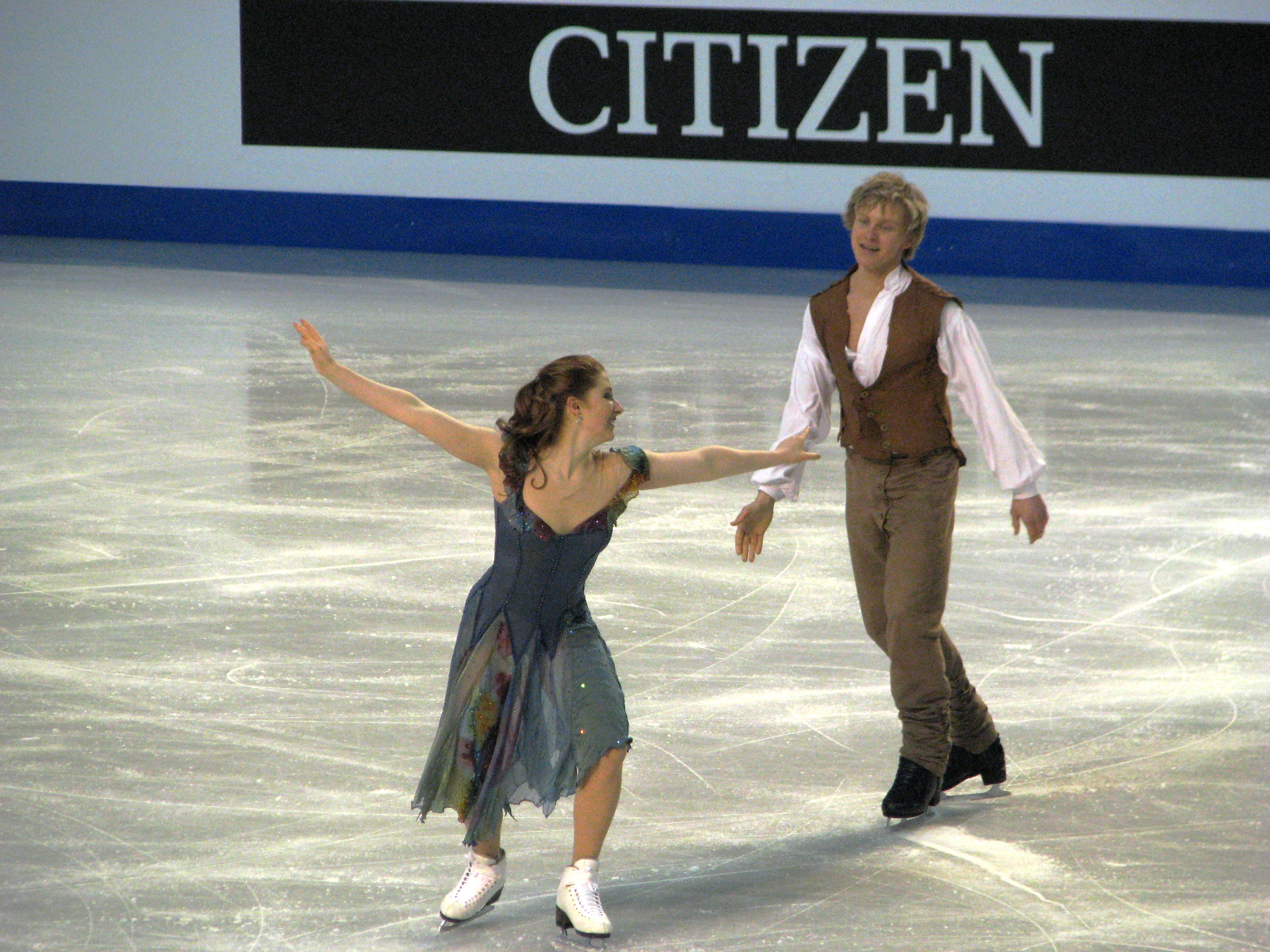
- Mallory and Rand at the 2010 European Championships

Personal information
- Born: June 2, 1987 (age 39) Oakland, California
- Home town: Berkeley, California
- Height: 5 ft 4 in (1.63 m)

Figure skating career
- Country: Estonia; United States
- Partner: Kristjan Rand (EST), Brent Holdburg (USA)
- Coach: Igor Shpilband, Marina Zoueva, Lea Rand, Sergei Ponomarenko, Marina Klimova
- Skating club: Jääkild FSC
- Retired: c. 2010

Caitlin Mallory (born June 2, 1987) is an American former ice dancer. She is the 2005 Golden Spin of Zagreb silver medalist with Brent Holdburg. In 2008, she began appearing internationally for Estonia with Kristjan Rand. They competed in the final segment at four ISU Championships.

== Personal life ==
Mallory was born on June 2, 1987, in Oakland, California. After attending Santa Clara University, she transferred to the University of Michigan, where she studied neuroscience.

== Career ==
=== Early career ===
Early in her career, Mallory competed as a single skater on the sectional level in the United States. By 2003, she was competing in ice dancing with Brent Holdburg for the United States. They won the silver medal at the 2005 Golden Spin of Zagreb. After their partnership ended in 2007, Mallory skated briefly with Maxim Zavozin.

=== Partnership with Rand ===
Coaches Igor Shpilband and Marina Zueva suggested that Mallory try out with Estonian ice dancer Kristjan Rand. She began competing with Rand for Estonia in the 2008–2009 season. They qualified to the free dance at both of their ISU Championships assignments, finishing 14th at the 2009 European Championships in Helsinki, Finland, and 20th at the 2009 World Championships in Los Angeles, California.

Early the following season, Mallory/Rand placed 9th at the 2009 Nebelhorn Trophy, giving Estonia a spot in the ice dancing event at the 2010 Winter Olympics in Vancouver. They placed 8th at their sole Grand Prix assignment, the 2009 Skate America. They did not compete in Canada because the Olympics, unlike other competitions, required both partners to be citizens of the country they were representing and Estonia did not allow dual nationality, meaning that Mallory would have to renounce her U.S. citizenship. She said, "we just realized it was too much of a sacrifice for one competition." Estonia's spot at the Olympics was used by Rand's brother and his partner. Mallory/Rand placed 13th at the 2010 European Championships in Tallinn, Estonia, and 17th at the 2010 World Championships in Turin, Italy.

The two missed the 2010–2011 season due to Rand's compulsory one-year military service and both skaters' plans to finish college. They did not return to competition.

== Programs ==
(with Rand)

Season	Original dance	Free dance
2009–2010	Estonian folk dance: Mulgi Polka; Estonian Waltz; Mulgi Polka	Peer Gynt by Edvard Grieg
2008–2009	Ragtime (20s): Yes Sir, That's My Baby; Foxtrot (20s): Yes Sir, That's My Baby by Walter Donaldson; Charleston (20s)	Suite No. 3 Air; Toccata and Fugue in D minor, BWV 565 by Johann Sebastian Bach

== Competitive highlights ==
GP: Grand Prix; JGP: Junior Grand Prix

=== With Rand for Estonia ===
International
Event	2008–09	2009–10
World Championships	20th	17th
European Championships	14th	13th
GP Skate America		8th
Finlandia Trophy	4th	
Nebelhorn Trophy		9th
Schäfer Memorial	6th	

=== With Holdburg for the United States ===
International
Event	2003–04	2004–05	2005–06	2006–07
Golden Spin			2nd	
Schäfer Memorial				4th
International: Junior
JGP Ukraine		4th		
JGP United States		9th		
National
U.S. Championships	11th J	2nd J	11th	7th
