= Igor Shpilband =

American figure skater (born 1964)

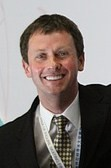

Personal information
- Full name: Igor Yuryevich Shpilband
- Born: July 14, 1964 (age 61) Moscow, Russian SFSR, Soviet Union
- Spouse: Veronica Pershina (divorced)

Igor Yuryevich Shpilband (Russian: Игорь Юрьевич Шпильбанд, born July 14, 1964) is an American ice dancing coach and former competitor for the Soviet Union. He is the 1983 World Junior champion with former partner Tatiana Gladkova.

== Personal life ==
Shpilband was born in Moscow on July 14, 1964, to a Jewish family. In 1990, he and several other Soviet skaters were part of a U.S. tour headlined by Jayne Torvill and Christopher Dean when one of them, Gorsha Sur, decided to defect; Shpilband, Veronica Pershina and Elena Krykanova decided to join him.

Shpilband got a coaching position in Detroit not long after. He became a naturalized United States citizen in 2000. With his former wife Veronica Pershina, he has a son, Maxim, and a daughter, Ekaterina, a competitive figure skater for the United States. In 2006, he became engaged to skating coach Adrienne Lenda.

== Competitive and coaching career ==
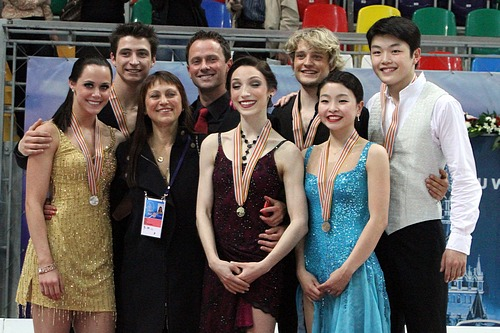
Shpilband (4th from left) in 2011 with Marina Zueva and students Tessa Virtue / Scott Moir, Meryl Davis / Charlie White, and Maia Shibutani / Alex Shibutani

Shpilband was coached by Lyudmila Pakhomova from age 12 to 20. He and his partner, Tatiana Gladkova, won the silver medal at the 1982 World Junior Championships and then gold in 1983. Shpilband retired from competitive skating following Pakhomova's death in 1986.

Following his defection, he began working as a coach and choreographer at the Detroit Skating Club. Gorsha Sur recommended him as a coach to Elizabeth Punsalan and Jerod Swallow, who were among his first students. Shpilband formerly worked in collaboration with British coach Elizabeth Coates. He began coaching with Marina Zueva in 2001. In 2003, Shpilband began coaching at the Arctic Edge Arena in Canton, Michigan. On June 3, 2012, Shpilband confirmed that he had been fired from the Arctic Edge Arena. On June 12, it was announced that he had begun coaching at the Novi Ice Arena in Novi, Michigan. Pasquale Camerlengo began working alongside him in 2018.

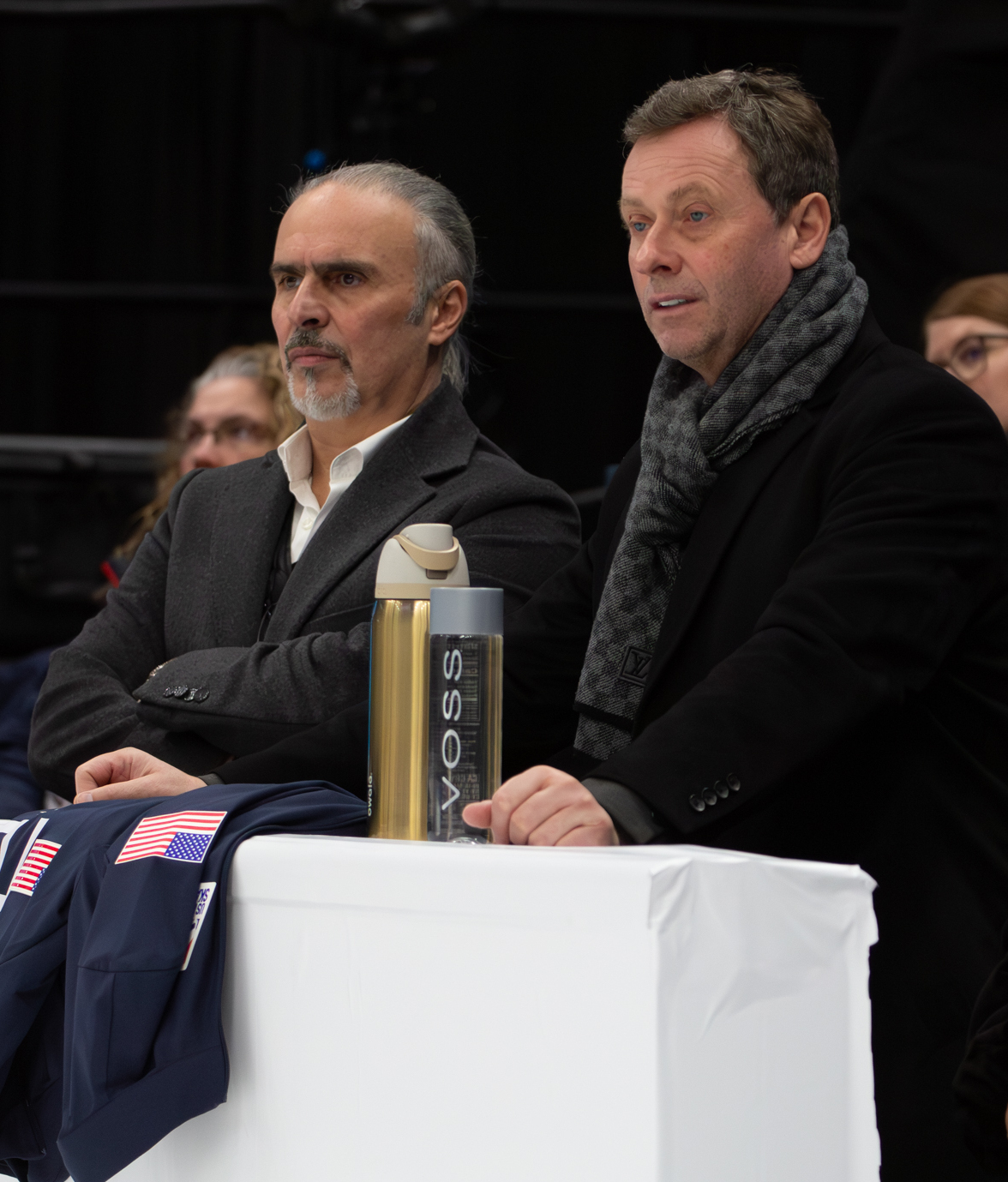
Shpilband (right) with Pasquale Camerlengo (left) at the 2026 U.S. Championships

His current and former students include:

- (Ukraine) Alisa Agafonova / Dmitri Dun
- (United States) Alissandra Aronow / Zachary Donohue
- (United States) Tanith Belbin / Benjamin Agosto
- (Belgium) Sofiia Beznosikova / Max Leleu
- (Italy) Anna Cappellini / Luca Lanotte
- (United States) Christina Carreira / Anthony Ponomarenko
- (United States) Eve Chalom / Mathew Gates
- (United States) Madison Chock / Evan Bates
- (United States) Madison Chock / Greg Zuerlein
- (United Kingdom) Penny Coomes / Nicholas Buckland
- (Lithuania) Katherine Copely / Deividas Stagniūnas
- (Russia) Diana Davis / Gleb Smolkin
- (United States) Meryl Davis / Charlie White
- (Lithuania) Margarita Drobiazko / Povilas Vanagas
- (Italy) Charlène Guignard / Marco Fabbri
- (Estonia) Grethe Grünberg / Kristian Rand
- (Finland) Daniela Ivanitskiy / Matthew Sperry
- (United States) Jessica Joseph / Charles Butler
- (United States) Jessica Joseph / Brandon Forsyth
- (Canada) Siobhan Karam / Joshua McGrath
- (United States) Naomi Lang / Peter Tchernyshev
- (United States) Chloe Lewis / Logan Bye
- (United States) Charlotte Lichtman / Dean Copely
- (Germany) Kavita Lorenz / Joti Polizoakis
- (Estonia) Caitlin Mallory / Kristian Rand
- (United States) Lydia Manon / Brandon Forsyth
- (United States) Lydia Manon / Michel Klus
- (United States) Lydia Manon / Ryan O'Meara
- (South Korea) Yura Min / Daniel Eaton
- (South Korea) Yura Min / Alexander Gamelin
- (Ukraine) Oleksandra Nazarova / Maxim Nikitin
- (United States) Avonley Nguyen / Vadym Kolesnik
- (United States) Eva Pate / Logan Bye
- (France) Nathalie Pechalat / Fabian Bourzat
- (Poland) Justyna Plutowska / Peter Gerber
- (United States) Elliana Pogrebinsky / Alex Benoit
- (United States) Elizabeth Punsalan / Jerod Swallow
- (Norway) Thea Rabe / Tim Koleto
- (Azerbaijan) Samantha Ritter / Daniel Brykalov
- (United States) Jasmine Robertson / Chase Rohner
- (Canada) Lauren Senft / Leif Gislason
- (Canada) Lauren Senft / Augie Hill
- (United States) Maia Shibutani / Alex Shibutani
- (Belgium) Olivia Josephine Shilling / Leo Baeten
- (United States) Jamie Silverstein / Ryan O'Meara
- (United States) Jamie Silverstein / Justin Pekarek
- (Lithuania) Isabella Tobias / Deividas Stagniūnas
- (Israel) Isabella Tobias / Ilia Tkachenko
- (United Kingdom) Robynne Tweedale / Joseph Buckland
- (Canada) Tessa Virtue / Scott Moir
- (Canada) Megan Wing / Aaron Lowe
- (United States) Katarina Wolfkostin / Jeffrey Chen
- (China) Yu Xiaoyang / Wang Chen
- (United States) Emilea Zingas / Vadym Kolesnik

== Competitive highlights ==
(with Gladkova)

Event	1981–82	1982–83	1983–84
World Junior Champ.	2nd	1st	
Golden Spin of Zagreb			2nd
