= Marina Zoueva =

Russian ice dancer and figure skating coach

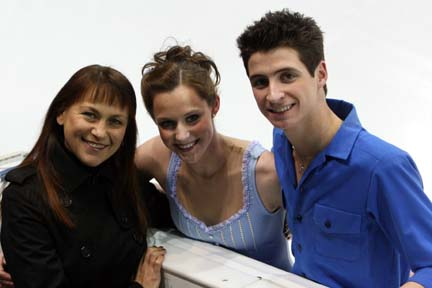
- Zoueva (left) with former students Tessa Virtue and Scott Moir in 2007

Personal information
- Full name: Marina Olegovna Zueva
- Born: 9 April 1956 (age 70) Moscow, Russian SFSR, Soviet Union

Figure skating career
- Country: Soviet Union

Marina Olegovna Zoueva or Zueva (Russian: Марина Олеговна Зуева; born 9 April 1956) is a Russian figure skating coach, choreographer, and former competitor in ice dancing. Representing the Soviet Union with Andrei Vitman, she placed 5th at the 1977 World Championships and won two medals at Skate Canada International. She has coached a number of skaters to Olympic medals, including Ekaterina Gordeeva / Sergei Grinkov (gold in 1994), Tessa Virtue / Scott Moir (gold in 2010 and 2018), Meryl Davis / Charlie White (gold in 2014), and Maia Shibutani / Alex Shibutani (bronze in 2018).

== Personal life ==
Zoueva was born on 9 April 1956. She is the mother of Fedor Andreev – born 2 March 1982 in Moscow – who competed for Canada as a singles skater and Russia as an ice dancer. She is a naturalized Canadian citizen but works mainly in the United States. Zueva was formerly married to Alexei Tchetverukhin. She holds a master's degree of physical science from Saint Petersburg State University.

== Career ==
=== As a competitor ===
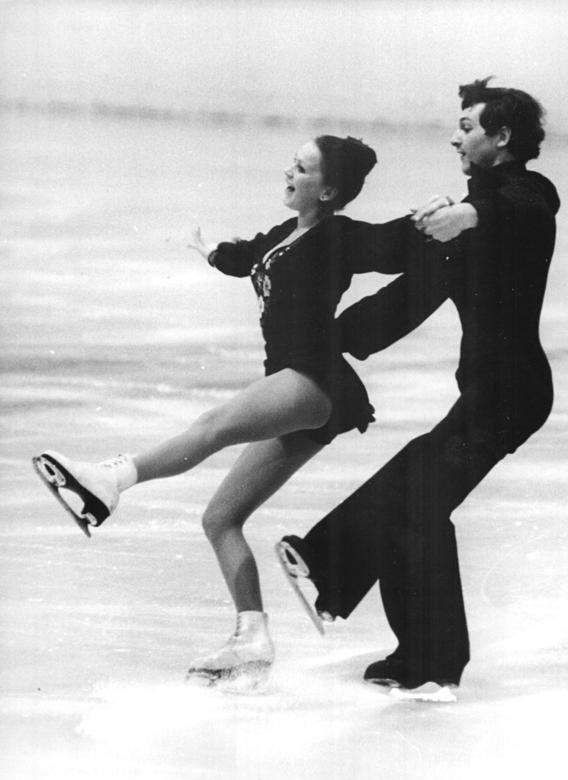
Zueva and Vitman in Berlin in October 1975

Zoueva competed for the Soviet Union as an ice dancer with partner Andrei Vitman. They won two national bronze medals at the Soviet Championships. They finished fifth at the 1977 European and World Championships. The next season, they were sixth at the 1978 European Championships and seventh at the World Championships.

=== As a coach and choreographer ===
Zoueva retired from ice dancing at the end of the 1970s to become a choreographer. Her final assignment toward receiving her choreography degree at the National Theatre Institute in Moscow in 1982 was the creation of a routine for Ekaterina Gordeeva and Sergei Grinkov. Throughout the 1980s, she continued to choreograph for this elite pair, creating their programs to Moonlight Sonata, Vocalise, and Romeo and Juliet. In 1993, Gordeeva and Grinkov hired Zoueva to work with them again on their 1994 Olympics routines, and their collaboration continued until Grinkov's death in late 1995. Zueva then choreographed most of Gordeeva's solo programs through 2000.

Zoueva left Russia in 1991 to work as a coach and choreographer in North America. She coached at the Arctic Figure Skating Club in Canton, Michigan, as part of the International Skating Academy. In 2001, she began a coaching partnership with Igor Shpilband. On 3 June 2012, she confirmed that they were no longer working together. In January 2019, she announced that she had relocated the International Skating Academy to the Hertz Arena in Estero, Florida.

Her current and former students include:

- (Turkey) Berk Akalın
- (United States) Tanith Belbin / Benjamin Agosto
- (Italy) Anna Cappellini / Luca Lanotte
- (Canada) Patrick Chan
- (United States) Nathan Chen
- (United States) Madison Chock / Greg Zuerlein
- (United States) Madison Chock / Evan Bates
- (Lithuania) Katherine Copely / Deividas Stagniūnas
- (United States) Meryl Davis / Charlie White
- (Philippines) Isabella Gamez / Aleksandr Korovin
- (United States) Gracie Gold
- (Russia) Ekaterina Gordeeva / Sergei Grinkov
- (Australia) Kimberley Hew-Low / Timothy McKernan
- (Turkey) Nicole Kelly / Berk Akalın
- (Russia) Jana Khokhlova / Fedor Andreev
- (Ukraine) Zoe Larson / Andrii Kapran
- (United States) Chloe Lewis / Logan Bye
- (United States) Charlotte Lichtman / Dean Copely
- (Germany) Kavita Lorenz / Joti Polizoakis
- (Estonia) Caitlin Mallory / Kristian Rand
- (United States) Lydia Manon / Brandon Forsyth
- (United States) Lydia Manon / Ryan O'Meara
- (Germany) Katharina Müller / Tim Dieck
- (Japan) Kana Muramoto / Chris Reed
- (Japan) Kana Muramoto / Daisuke Takahashi
- (Lithuania) Allison Reed / Saulius Ambrulevičius
- (Japan) Cathy Reed / Chris Reed
- (Canada) Lauren Senft / Leif Gislason
- (Canada) Lauren Senft / Augie Hill
- (United States) Maia Shibutani / Alex Shibutani
- (United States) Jamie Silverstein / Ryan O'Meara
- (Russia) Victoria Sinitsina / Nikita Katsalapov
- (Russia) Evgenia Tarasova/ Vladimir Morozov
- (Lithuania) Isabella Tobias / Deividas Stagniūnas
- (Lithuania) Taylor Tran / Saulius Ambrulevičius
- (Canada) Tessa Virtue / Scott Moir

As a choreographer, her clients have included:

- (United States) Sasha Cohen
- (United States) Alissa Czisny
- (United States) Caydee Denney / John Coughlin
- (Japan) Marin Honda
- (Japan) Takahiko Kozuka
- (Russia) Yulia Lipnitskaya
- (Japan) Yukari Nakano
- (China) Sui Wenjing / Han Cong
- (United States) Caitlin Yankowskas / John Coughlin

== Competitive highlights ==
International
Event	75–76	76–77	77–78	78–79
World Championships		5th	7th	
European Championships		5th	6th	
Prize of Moscow News		3rd	3rd	3rd
Skate Canada			2nd	3rd
National
Soviet Championships	3rd	3rd		5th
