= Bublichki (song) =

Soviet underground song

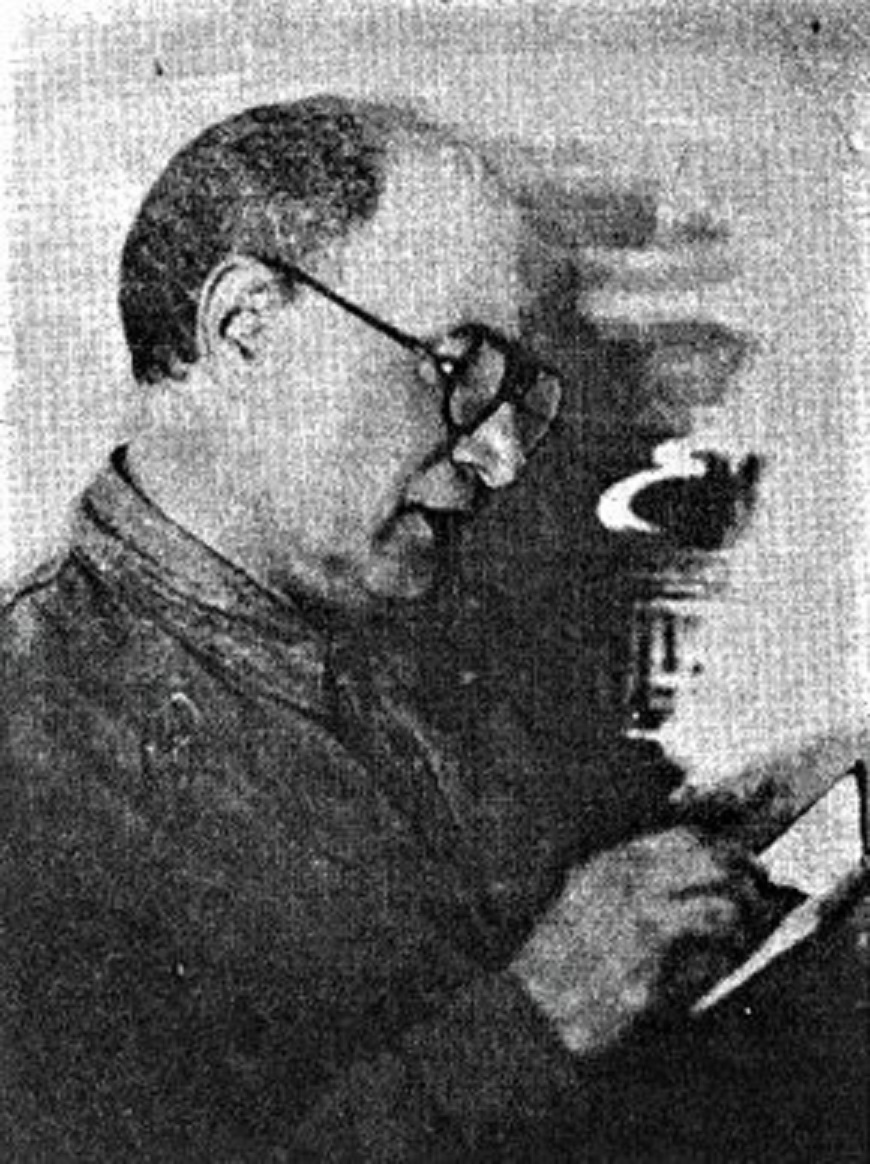
Yakov Yadov, the writer of Bublichki

"Bublitzki" — The Freak Fandango Orchestra

Bublichki (Russian: бублички, "hot buns" or "bagels"; sometimes transliterated as Bublitchki) is a Russian-language song from the New Economic Policy (NEP) era of the Soviet Union, written by Yakov Yadov. Тhe song's depiction of the harsh reality of life under the NEP resulted in it being banned until the late 1980s. Despite state repression, the song remained popular underground.

== Background ==
Bublichki was written in the context of the New Economic Policy, an early Soviet economic plan designed to boost the country's collapsed economy. The NEP's mixed economy featured private enterprise, in contrast to the previous war communism. While the NEP led to a resurgence in industrial and agricultural production, a large portion of the gains went to the wealthy NEPmen, leaving much of the general populace poor. The singer in Bublichki is one of those left behind by the NEP, forced to resort to selling food on the street in order to survive.

While there have been multiple claims to authorship, most scholars agree that the song was written by Yakov Yadov. Yadov was inspired to write the lyrics after a conversation with his friend, the performer Grigory Markovich Krasavin. Krasavin had seen many signs asking for people to buy bagels, and, playing a familiar violin melody, asked Yadov to write lyrics to go along with the tune. According to scholar Patricia Herlihy, the resulting blatnaya pesnya was one of the most popular songs of the NEP era. The song's subversive themes resulted in the government banning it until the late 1980s; despite the ban, it remained popular by being passed down through word of mouth, though this resulted in many different versions of the song.

The song proved persistently popular in translation among Yiddish-speaking Jews, though the translation lost the political nature of the original. The American duo the Barry Sisters performed that Yiddish version as late as after World War II. Bandleaders including Benny Goodman recorded English-language versions with the subtitle "The Pretzel Seller's Song." Bublichki was also reworked into a jazz song by Soviet singer and bandleader Leonid Utyosov, who performed it with his orchestra. Utyosov often performed songs from the blatnaya pesnya genre, including Bublichki and other songs by Yadov.

== Lyrics ==
As with many underground songs from the era, multiple versions of the lyrics exist.

| Russian | English translation |
|---|---|
| Бублички Ночь надвигается, фонарь шатается, Свет пробивается в ночную тьму. Я неумытая тряпьём прикрытая И вся разбитая, едва брожу. Припев: Купите бублички, горячи бублички, Несите рублички, сюда скорей! И в ночь ненастную, меня несчастную, Торговку частную, ты пожалей. Отец мой пьяница, он этим чванится, Он к гробу тянется, ему лишь пить. Сестра гулящая, а мать пропащая, А я курящая, глядите вот. Припев. Вот у хозяина проклятье Каина Потом на улицу меня прогнал. Кормилась дрянею, ловилась нянею, Теперь живу я да у кустаря. Припев. | Bagels Night draws near, the streetlight sways, Light fights through the dark of night. I'm unwashed, clad only in rags and I'm so broken, I can barely walk. Chorus: Buy my bagels, hot bagels, Give me your rubles, and do it quickly! And on this gloomy night, in my dire straits, Take pity on this poor peddler. All Dad does is drink, he boasts about it, It'll be the death of him, not that he cares. My sister walks the streets, Mom's mind is gone, And hey, look, I'm a smoker. Chorus. And then there's my old boss, he had the curse of Cain, He chased me into the street. I was living on trash until my nanny caught me, And now I live with a craftsman. Chorus. |
