= Midwestern Sectional Figure Skating Championships =

American figure skating competition

The Midwestern Sectional Figure Skating Championships is an annual figure skating competition sanctioned by U.S. Figure Skating. It is one of three sectional competitions, alongside the Eastern Sectional Figure Skating Championships and Pacific Coast Sectional Figure Skating Championships.

Skaters compete in five levels: Senior, Junior, Novice, Intermediate, and Juvenile. Medals are given out in four colors: gold (first), silver (second), bronze (third), and pewter (fourth). Stand-alone sectional competitions are held for men's singles and women's singles, but as of the 2022-23 season, not for ice dance or pairs. Per 2022 Governing Council approval, the pathway for advancement in the two partnered disciplines has changed to: National Qualifying Series directly to U.S. Ice Dance Final and U.S. Pairs Final (both for entries from all sections), and then to U.S. Figure Skating Championships.

Modifications began in the 2019-20 season to the conventional structure that skaters who place in the top four at sectionals advance to U.S. Figure Skating Championships. As of the 2019-20 season, the top two Novice skaters per sectional in men's singles and in women's singles advance to Junior-level competition at U.S. Figure Skating Championships -- which no longer hold singles competition at the level of Novice, Intermediate, or Juvenile. Starting with the 2022-23 season, only the top two Senior skaters per sectional in men's singles and in women's singles have been guaranteed to advance to U.S. Figure Skating Championships; next-best sectional scores nationwide (across all sections, in other words) have become necessary for other Senior competitors to advance.

For ice dance and pairs, U.S. Figure Skating Championships discontinued Novice, Intermediate and Juvenile competition starting in the 2019-20 season, but brought back Novice ice dance and Novice pairs for the 2023-24 and 2024-25 seasons.

Starting in the 2019-20 season, top Novice, Intermediate, and Juvenile skaters from Sectional Singles Finals (as they now are named), U.S. Ice Dance Final, and U.S. Pairs Final qualify for National High Performance Development Team camp.

== Senior medalists ==
=== Men's singles ===
Senior men's event medalists
Year	Location	Gold	Silver	Bronze	Pewter	Ref.
1933	St. Louis, MO	Robin Lee	William Swallender	Arthur Preusch Jr.	No pewter medals awarded	
1934	St. Louis, MO	William Swallender	Arthur Preusch Jr.	Ollie Haupt Jr.	No pewter medals awarded	
1935	Minneapolis, MN	Earl Reiter	William Swallender	Lyman Wakefield Jr.	No pewter medals awarded	
1936					No pewter medals awarded	
1937	Kansas City, MO	Robin Lee	Ollie Haupt Jr.	Eugene Reichel	No pewter medals awarded	
1938	Cleveland, OH	Robin Lee	Ollie Haupt Jr.	No other competitors	No pewter medals awarded	
1939	Cleveland, OH	Robin Lee	Ollie Haupt Jr.	Arthur Preusch Jr.	No pewter medals awarded	
1940					No pewter medals awarded	
1941	Cleveland, OH	Bobby Specht	Arthur Preusch Jr.	No other competitors	No pewter medals awarded	
1942	Chicago, IL	Bobby Specht	Arthur Preusch Jr.	Robert Premer	No pewter medals awarded	
1943	Cleveland, OH	Arthur Preusch Jr.	John Tuckerman	No other competitors	No pewter medals awarded	
1944	Cleveland, OH	Arthur Preusch Jr.	Michael McGean	No other competitors	No pewter medals awarded	
1945	Chicago, IL	Michael McGean	John Tuckerman	No other competitors	No pewter medals awarded	
1946	Cleveland, OH	John Lettengarver	Patrick Kadza II	No other competitors	No pewter medals awarded	
1947	Cleveland, OH	John Lettengarver	Gary Wilson	No other competitors	No pewter medals awarded	
1948	Rochester, MN	Hayes Alan Jenkins	Marlyn Thomsen	John Nightingale	No pewter medals awarded	
1949	Cleveland, OH	Marlyn Thomsen	Barry Gorman	Charles Brinkman	No pewter medals awarded	
1950	Chicago, IL	Marlyn Thomsen	Robert Keyes	Hugh Graham Jr.	No pewter medals awarded	
1951	Colorado Springs, CO	Hugh Graham Jr.	Carl Chamberlin	David Jenkins	No pewter medals awarded	
1952	Cleveland, OH	Ronnie Robertson	David Jenkins	Hugh Graham Jr.	No pewter medals awarded	
1953	Colorado Springs, CO	David Jenkins	Raymond Blommer	No other competitors	No pewter medals awarded	
1954	Lansing, MI	Raymond Blommer	Robert Keyes	Barlow Nelson	No pewter medals awarded	
1955	Minneapolis, MN	Barlow Nelson	Lee Carroll Owen	No other competitors	No pewter medals awarded	
1956	Cleveland, OH	Tommy Weinreich	David Shulman	No other competitors	No pewter medals awarded	
1957	Sioux City, IA	Tommy DeBaca	Richard Vraa	Edwin Zschau	No pewter medals awarded	
1958	Troy, OH	Lorin Caccamise	Tommy DeBaca	Richard Vraa	No pewter medals awarded	
1959	Denver, CO	Tommy DeBaca	Douglas Ramsay	Richard Vraa	No pewter medals awarded	
1960	Minneapolis, MN	Douglas Ramsay	Monty Hoyt	Tommy DeBaca	No pewter medals awarded	
1961	Troy, OH	Monty Hoyt	Gary Visconti	Bobby Mecay	No pewter medals awarded	
1962		Gary Visconti	Tommy DeBaca	Bobby Mecay	No pewter medals awarded	
1963	Sioux City, IA	Tim Wood	Bob Lubotina	Duane Maki	No pewter medals awarded	
1964	Detroit, MI	Tim Wood	Duane Maki	Robert Madden	No pewter medals awarded	
1965	Sioux City, IA	James Disbrow	Loren Carlson	Bob Lubotina	No pewter medals awarded	
1966	Colorado Springs, CO	Duane Maki	James Disbrow	Dana Charette	No pewter medals awarded	
1967	Cleveland, OH	Tim Wood	Paul McGrath	James Disbrow	No pewter medals awarded	
1968		Duane Maki	Torrey Sun	Stephen LeRoy	No pewter medals awarded	
1969	Denver, CO	Torrey Sun	Jeff Hall	Gilbert Sosa	No pewter medals awarded	
1970	Troy, OH	John Baldwin Sr.	Gilbert Sosa	Douglas Berndt	No pewter medals awarded	
1971	Rockton, IL	Johnny Johns	Jeff Hall	Gilbert Sosa	No pewter medals awarded	
1972	Minneapolis, MN	Jimmy Demogines	David Santee	Perry Hutchings	No pewter medals awarded	
1973	Denver, CO	David Santee	Charlie Tickner	John Baldwin Sr.	No pewter medals awarded	
1974	Euclid, OH	Charlie Tickner	John Baldwin Sr.	Jimmy Demogines	No pewter medals awarded	
1975	Rockton, IL	David Santee	Billy Schneider	Ronnie Green	No pewter medals awarded	
1976	Denver, CO	Scott Cramer	Billy Schneider	Frank Sweiding	No pewter medals awarded	
1977	Cincinnati, OH	Charlie Tickner	Billy Schneider	Scott Hamilton	No pewter medals awarded	
1978	Mt. Prospect, IL	David Santee	Charlie Tickner	Scott Hamilton	No pewter medals awarded	
1979	Colorado Springs, CO	Charlie Tickner	Scott Cramer	David Santee	No pewter medals awarded	
1980	Fort Wayne, IN	Charlie Tickner	David Santee	Jimmie Santee	No pewter medals awarded	
1981	Minneapolis, MN	David Santee	Jimmie Santee	Richard Zander	No pewter medals awarded	
1982	Houston, TX	Paul Wylie	Jimmie Santee	Tom Dickson	No pewter medals awarded	
1983	Colorado Springs, CO	Tom Dickson	James Cygan	Paul Wylie	No pewter medals awarded	
1984		Tom Dickson	Paul Wylie	Jimmie Santee	No pewter medals awarded	
1985	Denver, CO	James Cygan	Paul Wylie	Tom Zakrajsek	No pewter medals awarded	
1986	Indianapolis, IN	Daniel Doran	James Cygan	Todd Reynolds	No pewter medals awarded	
1987	Wilmette, IL	James Cygan	Todd Reynolds	David Liu	Tom Zakrajsek	
1988	Tulsa, OK	Daniel Doran	James Cygan	Angelo D'Agostino	Todd Reynolds	
1989	Detroit, MI	Daniel Doran	James Cygan	Angelo D'Agostino	Aren Nielsen	
1990	Edina, MN	Aren Nielsen	Shepherd Clark	Larry Holliday	Eddie Shipstad	
1991	Omaha, NE	Shepherd Clark	Daniel Doran	Scott Davis	Aren Nielsen	
1992	Lakewood, OH	Shepherd Clark	Aren Nielsen	Gig Siruno	No other competitors	
1993	Rockford, IL	Shepherd Clark	Damon Allen	Dan Hollander	Eddy Zeidler	
1994	Indianapolis, IN	Todd Eldredge	Dan Hollander	Gig Siruno	Mel Chapman	
1995	Denver, CO	Dan Hollander	Aren Nielsen	Brian Buetsch	Mel Chapman	
1996	Bloomington, MN	Dan Hollander	Matthew Kessinger	Eric Bohnstedt	Gig Siruno	
1997	Cincinnati, OH	Damon Allen	Matthew Kessinger	Brian Buetsch	Kevin Donovan	
1998	Irving, TX	Ryan Jahnke	Brian Buetsch	Matt Savoie	Matthew Kessinger	
1999	Bloomington, MN	Danny Clausen	Dan Hollander	Ryan Jahnke	Damon Allen	
2000	Detroit, MI	Damon Allen	Matt Savoie	Ryan Jahnke	Danny Clausen	
2001	Wichita, KS	Todd Eldredge	Danny Clausen	Evan Lysacek	Braden Overett	
2002	Northbrook, IL	Ryan Jahnke	Evan Lysacek	Rohene Ward	Parker Pennington	
2003	Franklin, TN	Evan Lysacek	Ryan Bradley	Ryan Jahnke	Braden Overett	
2004	Dallas, TX	Ryan Bradley	Benjamin Miller	Rohene Ward	Daniel Lee	
2005	Fargo, ND	Braden Overett	Parker Pennington	Jordan Brauninger	Wesley Campbell	
2006	Centennial, CO	Parker Pennington	Ryan Jahnke	Rohene Ward	Ryan Bradley	
2007	Pelham, AL	Jeremy Abbott	Ryan Bradley	Parker Pennington	Braden Overett	
2008	Rochester Hills, MI	Wesley Campbell	Rohene Ward	Braden Overett	Eliot Halverson	
2009	Sugar Land, TX	Parker Pennington	Eliot Halverson	Jonathan Cassar	William Brewster	
2010	Wichita, KS	Alexander Johnson	Wesley Campbell	Parker Pennington	Jonathan Cassar	
2011	Ann Arbor, MI	Jason Brown	Grant Hochstein	Parker Pennington	Alexander Johnson	
2012	Fort Collins, CO	Max Aaron	Grant Hochstein	Alexander Johnson	William Brewster	
2013	Cleveland, OH	Max Aaron	Alexander Johnson	Brandon Mroz	William Brewster	
2014	East Lansing, MI	Brandon Mroz	Lukas Kaugars	Scott Dyer	Robert Przepioski	
2015	Geneva, IL	Jordan Moeller	Alexander Johnson	Sebastien Payannet	Robert Przepioski	
2016	Strongsville, OH	Vincent Zhou	Alexander Johnson	Jordan Moeller	Sebastien Payannet	
2017	Colorado Springs, CO	Jordan Moeller	Alexander Johnson	Dennis Phan	Sebastien Payannet	
2018	Bloomington, MN	Alexander Johnson	Tomoki Hiwatashi	Jordan Moeller	Ben Jalovick	
2019	Fort Wayne, IN	Jordan Moeller	Emmanuel Savary	Ben Jalovick	Andrew Austin	
2020	Allen, TX	Jordan Moeller	Andrew Austin	Emmanuel Savary	Ben Jalovick	
2021	No competition held due to the COVID-19 pandemic					
2022	No competition held due to the COVID-19 pandemic					
2023	East Lansing, MI	Daniel Martynov	Matthew Nielsen	Joseph Klein	Mitchell Friess	
2024	Bloomington, MN	Tomoki Hiwatashi	Joseph Klein	Jordan Moeller	Nathan Chapple	
2025	Plano, TX	Tomoki Hiwatashi	Beck Strommer	Joseph Klein	Taira Shinohara	
2026	East Lansing, MI	Lorenzo Elano	Daniel Martynov	Kai Kovar	Taira Shinohara	

=== Women's singles ===
Senior women's event medalists
Year	Location	Gold	Silver	Bronze	Pewter	Ref.
1933	St. Louis, MO	Anne Haroldson	Katherine Dubrow	Edith Preusch	No pewter medals awarded	
1934	St. Louis, MO	Katherine Dubrow	Frances Johnson	Myra Azbe	No pewter medals awarded	
1935	Minneapolis, MN	Frances Johnson	Edith Preusch	Dorothy Snell	No pewter medals awarded	
1936					No pewter medals awarded	
1937	Kansas City, MO	Frances Johnson	Myra Jean Azbe	Elizabeth Ann Reflow	No pewter medals awarded	
1938	No competition held				No pewter medals awarded	
1939	Cleveland, OH	Shirley Bowman	Nancy Meyer		No pewter medals awarded	
1940					No pewter medals awarded	
1941	Cleveland, OH	Caroline Brandt	Joan Mitchell	Janette Ahrens	No pewter medals awarded	
1942	Chicago, IL	Joan Mitchell	Mary Louise Premer	Janette Ahrens	No pewter medals awarded	
1943	Cleveland, OH	Janette Ahrens	Barbara Raymond	Janet McGean	No pewter medals awarded	
1944	Cleveland, OH	Janette Ahrens	Joan Yocum	Jeanne Peterson	No pewter medals awarded	
1945	Chicago, IL	Janette Ahrens	Joan Swanston	Joan Yocum	No pewter medals awarded	
1946	Cleveland, OH	Janette Ahrens	Joan Swanston	Mary Frances Greshke	No pewter medals awarded	
1947	Cleveland, OH	Virginia Baxter	Joan Swanston	Helen Geekie	No pewter medals awarded	
1948	Rochester, MN	Virginia Baxter	Margaret Ann Graham	Faris Nourse	No pewter medals awarded	
1949	Cleveland, OH	Margaret Ann Graham	Slavka Kohout	Janet Gerhauser	No pewter medals awarded	
1950	Chicago, IL	Slavka Kohout	Margaret Ann Graham	Janet Gerhauser	No pewter medals awarded	
1951	Colorado Springs, CO	Slavka Kohout	Janet Gerhauser	Betty Lynne Stogner	No pewter medals awarded	
1952	Cleveland, OH	Betty Lynne Stogner	Nancy Rae Mineard	Nancy Gail Smith	No pewter medals awarded	
1953	Colorado Springs, CO	Mary Anne Dorsey	Betty Lynne Stogner	Jane Holmes	No pewter medals awarded	
1954	Lansing, MI	Mary Anne Dorsey	Claralynn Lewis	Patsy Herrick	No pewter medals awarded	
1955	Minneapolis, MN	Charlene Adams	Gladys Irene Jacobs	Carol Keyes	No pewter medals awarded	
1956	Cleveland, OH	Carol Keyes	Gladys Irene Jacobs	Sandy Blair	No pewter medals awarded	
1957	Sioux City, IA	Stephanie Westerfeld	Judy Boner	Dorothy Ann Nelson	No pewter medals awarded	
1958	Troy, OH	Stephanie Westerfeld	Diana Lapp	Carol Keyes	No pewter medals awarded	
1959	Denver, CO	Stephanie Westerfeld	Diana Lapp	Vicky Fisher	No pewter medals awarded	
1960	Minneapolis, MN	Stephanie Westerfeld	Victoria Fisher	Pam Zekman	No pewter medals awarded	
1961	Troy, OH	Victoria Fisher	Yvonne Drummond	Donna Abbott	No pewter medals awarded	
1962		Christine Haigler	Myrna Bodek	Yvonne Drummond	No pewter medals awarded	
1963	Sioux City, IA	Maidie Sullivan	Yvonne Drummond	Chickie Berlin	No pewter medals awarded	
1964	Detroit, MI	Yvonne Drummond	Louise Wakefield	Chickie Berlin	No pewter medals awarded	
1965	Sioux City, IA	Gail Newberry	Janet Lynn	Lynn Haglund	No pewter medals awarded	
1966	Colorado Springs, CO	Gail Newberry	Janet Lynn	Ardith Paul	No pewter medals awarded	
1967	Cleveland, OH	Janet Lynn	Maud-Frances Dubos	Ardith Paul	No pewter medals awarded	
1968		Janet Lynn	Kathy Brennan	Patty Grazier	No pewter medals awarded	
1969	Denver, CO	Julie Lynn Holmes	Wen-an Sun	Kathy Brennan	No pewter medals awarded	
1970	Troy, OH	Cindy Watson	Susanne Susic	Maud-Frances Dubos	No pewter medals awarded	
1971	Rockton, IL	Cindy Watson	Diane Goldstein	Maud-Frances Dubos	No pewter medals awarded	
1972	Minneapolis, MN	Kath Malmberg	Diane Goldstein	Juli McKinstry	No pewter medals awarded	
1973	Denver, CO	Juli McKinstry	Diane Goldstein	Kath Malmberg	No pewter medals awarded	
1974	Euclid, OH	Kath Malmberg	Donna Arquilla	Paula Larson	No pewter medals awarded	
1975	Rockton, IL	Karen DeAngelo	Paula Larson	Teri Klindworth	No pewter medals awarded	
1976	Denver, CO	Karen DeAngelo	Editha Dotson	Teri Klindworth	No pewter medals awarded	
1977	Cincinnati, OH	Kathy Gelecinskyj	Editha Dotson	Barbie Smith	No pewter medals awarded	
1978	Mt. Prospect, IL	Kelsy Ufford	Sandy Lenz	Editha Dotson	No pewter medals awarded	
1979	Colorado Springs, CO	Sandy Lenz	Alicia Risberg	Kelsy Ufford	No pewter medals awarded	
1980	Fort Wayne, IN	Sandy Lenz	Alicia Risberg	Jacki Farrell	No pewter medals awarded	
1981	Minneapolis, MN	Vikki de Vries	Jacki Farrell	Dana Graham	No pewter medals awarded	
1982	Houston, TX	Jacki Farrell	Vikki de Vries	Kelly Webster	No pewter medals awarded	
1983	Colorado Springs, CO	Vikki de Vries	Kelly Webster	Caroline Silby	No pewter medals awarded	
1984		Maradith Feinberg	Kelly Webster	Staci McMullin	No pewter medals awarded	
1985	Denver, CO	Maradith Feinberg	Caryn Kadavy	Staci McMullin	No pewter medals awarded	
1986	Indianapolis, IN	Jill Trenary	Kelly Ann Szmurlo	Debbie Tucker	No pewter medals awarded	
1987	Wilmette, IL	Dawn Victorson	Kelly Ann Szmurlo	Micki McMahon	Carrie Webber	
1988	Tulsa, OK	Kelly Szmurlo	Tonia Kwiatkowski	Lisa Cornelius	Jodi Friedman	
1989	Detroit, MI	Jenni Meno	Tonia Kwiatkowski	Kelly Szmurlo	Kathryn Curielli	
1990	Edina, MN	Tonia Kwiatkowski	Jenni Meno	Carrie Webber	Jodi Friedman	
1991	Omaha, NE	Tonia Kwiatkowski	Nicole Bobek	Stacy Rutkowski	Leana Naczynski	
1992	Lakewood, OH	Jill Trenary	Leana Naczynski	Robyn Petroskey	Cindy Caraos	
1993	Rockford, IL	Tonia Kwiatkowski	Emily Dulde	Sara Kastner	Lisa Matras	
1994	Indianapolis, IN	Tanya Street	Lisa Matras	Jessica Mills	Denise Long	
1995	Denver, CO	Tonia Kwiatkowski	Jessica Mills	Tanya Street	Lisa Matras	
1996	Bloomington, MN	Robyn Petroskey	Jennifer Karl	Alice Sue Claeys	Jilliane Jackson	
1997	Cincinnati, OH	Lisa Bell	Robyn Petroskey	Erin Sutton	Lindsay Page	
1998	Irving, TX	Tonia Kwiatkowski	Andrea Gardiner	Emily Freedman	Lindsay Page	
1999	Bloomington, MN	Andrea Aggeler	Melissa Parker	Erin Pearl	Angie Lien	
2000	Detroit, MI	Katie Lee	Heidi Pakkala	Andrea Gardiner	Andrea Aggeler	
2001	Wichita, KS	Ann Patrice McDonough	Andrea Gardiner	Lisa Nesuda	Katie Lee	
2002	Northbrook, IL	Andrea Gardiner	Alissa Czisny	Ann Patrice McDonough	Molly Quigley	
2003	Franklin, TN	Amber Czisny	Alissa Czisny	Angie Lien	Kelsey Drewel	
2004	Dallas, TX	Andrea Gardiner	Alissa Czisny	Natalie Mecher	Alexandra Patterson	
2005	Fargo, ND	Katy Taylor	Alissa Czisny	Erica Archambault	Angie Lien	
2006	Centennial, CO	Katy Taylor	Erica Archambault	Abigail Legg	Megan Oster	
2007	Pelham, AL	Rachael Flatt	Megan Hyatt	Angie Lien	Ambar Kaisar	
2008	Rochester Hills, MI	Molly Oberstar	Becky Bereswill	Megan Hyatt	Angie Lien	
2009	Sugar Land, TX	Molly Oberstar	Melissa Telecky	Brittney Westdorp	Tatyana Khazova	
2010	Wichita, KS	Chelsea Morrow	Christina-Maria Sperduto	Kayla Howey	Tatyana Khazova	
2011	Ann Arbor, MI	Alissa Czisny	Morgan Bell	Katy Jo West	Tatyana Khazova	
2012	Fort Collins, CO	Nina Jiang	McKinzie Daniels	Kiri Baga	Morgan Bell	
2013	Cleveland, OH	Ashley Cain	Becky Bereswill	Kiri Baga	Morgan Bell	
2014	East Lansing, MI	Hannah Miller	Ashley Cain	Barbie Long	Mariah Bell	
2015	Geneva, IL	Mariah Bell	Amber Glenn	Ashley Shin	Christina Cleveland	
2016	Strongsville, OH	Bradie Tennell	Avery Kurtz	Alexie Mieskoski	Christina Cleveland	
2017	Colorado Springs, CO	Tessa Hong	Hannah Miller	Amber Glenn	Ashley Shin	
2018	Bloomington, MN	Hannah Miller	Brynne McIsaac	Emily Chan	Ashley Lin	
2019	Fort Wayne, IN	Amber Glenn	Hanna Harrell	Pooja Kalyan	Hannah Miller	
2020	Allen, TX	Paige Rydberg	Courtney Hicks	Alyssa Rich	Maxine Marie Bautista	
2021	No competition held due to the COVID-19 pandemic					
2022	No competition held due to the COVID-19 pandemic					
2023	East Lansing, MI	Elsa Cheng	Alexa Gasparotto	Sonja Hilmer	Emilia Murdock	
2024	Bloomington, MN	Wren Warne-Jacobsen	Clare Seo	Sonja Hilmer	Michelle Lee	
2025	Plano, TX	Alina Bonillo	Logan Higase-Chen	Sonja Hilmer	Alexa Gasparotto	
2026	Plano, TX	Emilia Nemirovsky	Logan Higase-Chen	Sonja Hilmer	Brooke Gewalt	

=== Pairs ===
Senior pairs event medalists
Year	Location	Gold	Silver	Bronze	Pewter	Ref.
1933	St. Louis, MO	Edith Preusch; Arthur Preusch Jr.	Katherine Durbrow; Louis Fancher Cody	No other competitors	No pewter medals awarded	
1934	St. Louis, MO	Ruth English; Len Fogassey	Edith Preusch; Arthur Preusch Jr.	Jeanne Schulte; Ollie Haupt Jr.	No pewter medals awarded	
1935	Minneapolis, MN	Ruth English; Len Fogassey	Jeanne Schulte; Ollie Haupt Jr.	Edith Preusch; Arthur Preusch Jr.	No pewter medals awarded	
1936					No pewter medals awarded	
1937	Kansas City, MO	Eleanor Hellmund; Eduardo Hellmund	Josephine Fogassey; Len Fogassey	Frances Johnson; Eugene Reichel	No pewter medals awarded	
1938	Cleveland, OH	Ruth English; Louis Pitts	Eleanor Hellmund; Eduardo Hellmund	Josephine Fogassey; Len Fogassey	No pewter medals awarded	
1939	Cleveland, OH	Ruth English; Louis Pitts	Angeline Knapp; Jay Pike	No other competitors	No pewter medals awarded	
1940					No pewter medals awarded	
1941	Cleveland, OH	Joan Mitchell; Bobby Specht	Joanne Frazier; James Greene	No other competitors	No pewter medals awarded	
1942	Chicago, IL	Janette Ahrens; Robert Uppgren	Gail Sparks; Edward van der Bosch	No other competitors	No pewter medals awarded	
1943	Cleveland, OH	Janette Ahrens; Robert Uppgren	Sally Blair; Huntington Blair	No other competitors	No pewter medals awarded	
1944	Cleveland, OH	Janette Ahrens; Arthur Preusch Jr.	Joanne Frazier; Michael McGean	No other competitors	No pewter medals awarded	
1945	Chicago, IL	Ann McGean; Michael McGean	Sally Blair; Huntington Blair	No other competitors	No pewter medals awarded	
1946	Cleveland, OH	Harriet Sutton; John Lettengarver	Beverly Dean Osburn; Patrick C. Kazda II	No other competitors	No pewter medals awarded	
1947	Cleveland, OH	Harriet Sutton; John Lettengarver	Jane Schellentrager; Riki Bliss	No other competitors	No pewter medals awarded	
1948	Rochester, MN	Nancy Sue; Hayes Alan Jenkins	Jane Schellentrager; Riki Bliss	Janet Gerhauser; John Nightingale	No pewter medals awarded	
1949	Cleveland, OH	Janet Gerhauser; John Nightingale	Nancy Rae Mineard; Charles Brinkman	Renee Clark; William Lang	No pewter medals awarded	
1950	Chicago, IL	Janet Gerhauser; John Nightingale	Renee Clark; William Lang	Lucille Ash; Carl Chamberlin	No pewter medals awarded	
1951	Colorado Springs, CO	Janet Gerhauser; John Nightingale	Lucille Ash; Carl Chamberlin	No other competitors	No pewter medals awarded	
1952	Cleveland, OH	Patsy Ann Buck; Martin Coonan Jr.	Margaret Anne Graham; Hugh Graham	Renee Clark; William Lang	No pewter medals awarded	
1953	Colorado Springs, CO	Kay Servatius; Sully Kothman	Susan Sebo; Lee Carroll Owen	No other competitors	No pewter medals awarded	
1954	Lansing, MI	Lucille Ash; Sully Kothman	Jane Holmes; Lee Carroll Owen	Janie Gage; Hugh Dean Jr.	No pewter medals awarded	
1955	No competition held				No pewter medals awarded	
1956	Cleveland, OH	Antoinette Abell; Bob Keyes	Margaret Jurmo; Roy Pringle	No other competitors	No pewter medals awarded	
1957	Sioux City, IA	Mary Jane Watson; John Jarmon	Margaret Jurmo; Roy Pringle	Gayle Freed; Karl Freed	No pewter medals awarded	
1958	Troy, OH	Gayle Freed; Karl Freed	Janet Harley; James Browning	No other competitors	No pewter medals awarded	
1959	Denver, CO	Sheila Wells; Tom Moore	Janet Harley; James Browning	Gail Kizer; Lonnie Kane	No pewter medals awarded	
1960	Minneapolis, MN	Gayle Freed; Karl Freed	Vivian Joseph; Ronald Joseph	Joan Santo; Jack Woodstrom	No pewter medals awarded	
1961	Troy, OH	Janet Browning; James Browning	Vivian Joseph; Ronald Joseph	Nancy Streff; James Kelleher	No pewter medals awarded	
1962		Vivian Joseph; Ronald Joseph	Joanne Heckert; Gary Clark	Kathy Fellers; Gene Floyd	No pewter medals awarded	
1963	Sioux City, IA	Joanne Heckert; Gary Clark	Barbara Yaggi; Gene Floyd	Sara Beth Riecken; Mac Cummins	No pewter medals awarded	
1964	Detroit, MI	Barbara Hartwig; Bobby Mecay	Barbara Yaggi; Gene Floyd	Judy James; Lowell Green	No pewter medals awarded	
1965	Sioux City, IA	Nancy Hagan; Thomas Hagan	Chickie Berlin; Ronald Basten	Bona Dai Beckstrom; Robert Lubotina	No pewter medals awarded	
1966	Colorado Springs, CO	Wen-an Sun; Torrey Sun	Bona Beckstrom; Bobby Mecay	Dede Dahlberg; Lowell Green	No pewter medals awarded	
1967	Cleveland, OH	Joanne Heckert; Gary Clark	Wen-an Sun; Torrey Sun	Nancy Hagan; Thomas Hagan	No pewter medals awarded	
1968		Joanne Heckert; Gary Clark	Wen-an Sun; Torrey Sun	No other competitors	No pewter medals awarded	
1969	No competition held				No pewter medals awarded	
1970	No competition held				No pewter medals awarded	
1971	Rockton, IL	Barbara Brown; Doug Berndt	Laura Johnson; Johnny Johns	Sherry Vangieson; Dennis Vangieson	No pewter medals awarded	
1972	Minneapolis, MN	Laura Johnson; Johnny Johns	Cozette Cady; Jack Courtney	Debbie Hughes; Phillipp Grout	No pewter medals awarded	
1973	Denver, CO	Debbie Hughes; Phillipp Grout	No other competitors		No pewter medals awarded	
1974	Euclid, OH	Patty Morton; James Demogines	Beth Sweiding; Frank Sweiding	Suki Hoagland; Michael Sahlin	No pewter medals awarded	
1975	Rockton, IL	Emily Benenson; Jack Courtney	Gail Hamula; Phillipp Grout	Rose Mary Wilzbacher; Rick Turley	No pewter medals awarded	
1976	Denver, CO	Holly Blunt; Bruce Hurd	Beth Sweiding; Frank Sweiding	Janet Van Camp; Gordon Black	No pewter medals awarded	
1977	Cincinnati, OH	Gail Hamula; Frank Sweiding	Holly Blunt; Bruce Hurd	Kathy Laisure; Brian Kader	No pewter medals awarded	
1978	Mt. Prospect, IL	Gail Hamula; Frank Sweiding	Judi Owens; Bill Fauver	No other competitors	No pewter medals awarded	
1979	Colorado Springs, CO	Lee Ann Miller; William Fauver	Kathy Laisure; Brian Kader	No other competitors	No pewter medals awarded	
1980	Fort Wayne, IN	Tricia Burton; Larry Schrier	Lyndy Marron; Hal Marron	Susan Kearney; Richard Murphy	No pewter medals awarded	
1981	No competition held				No pewter medals awarded	
1982	Houston, TX	Karyl Kawaichi; Larry Schrier	Dawn Roberge; Dale Roberge	No other competitors	No pewter medals awarded	
1983	Colorado Springs, CO	Natalie Seybold; Wayne Seybold	Kimberly Shawn Bargaret; Ronald Holbrook	No other competitors	No pewter medals awarded	
1984		Maria Lako; Michael Blicharski	Stacey Gaker; Richard Hartley	Sheila Nobles; Joshua Roberts	No pewter medals awarded	
1985	Denver, CO	Natalie Seybold; Wayne Seybold	Maria Lako; Michael Blicharski	Margo Shoup; Patrick Page	No pewter medals awarded	
1986	Indianapolis, IN	Natalie Seybold; Wayne Seybold	Susan Dungjen; Jason Dungjen	Deveny Deck; Luke Hohmann	No pewter medals awarded	
1987	Wilmette, IL	Maradith Feinberg; Craig Maurizi	Maria Lako; Joel McKeever	Heidi Franks; Luke Hohmann	Sherry Kern; Michael Kern	
1988	Tulsa, OK	Natalie Seybold; Wayne Seybold	Shandra Smith; Brandon Smith	Julianne Thompson; Brian Geddeis	Elaine Asanakis; Joel McKeever	
1989	Detroit, MI	Paula Visingardi; Jason Dungjen	Elaine Asanakis; Joel McKeever	Julianne Thompson; Brian Geddeis	Shandra Smith; Brandon Smith	
1990	Edina, MN	Jennifer Heurlin; John Frederiksen	Elaine Asanakis; Joel McKeever	Paula Visingardi; Jason Dungjen	Angela Denewith; John Denton	
1991	Omaha, NE	Elaine Asanakis; Joel McKeever	Jennifer Heurlin; John Frederiksen	Susan Purdy; Scott Chimulera	Erin Moorad; Jeff Myers	
1992	Lakewood, OH	Jennifer Heurlin; John Frederiksen	Laura Murphy; Brian Wells	Katie Wood; Joel McKeever	Cambria Goodman; Steven Moore	
1993	Rockford, IL	Jennifer Perez; John Frederiksen	Erin Moorad; Ken Benson	Holly Benson; Steven Moore	Jennifer Darst; Floyd Johnson	
1994	Indianapolis, IN	Tristan Vega; Joel McKeever	Holly Benson; Steven Moore	Laura Murphy; Brian Wells	Aimee Offner; Brad Cox	
1995	Denver, CO	Shelby Lyons; Brian Wells	Cheryl Marker; Todd Price	Holly Benson; Steven Moore	Brie Teaboldt; John Zimmerman	
1996	Bloomington, MN	Cheryl Marker; Todd Price	Jennifer Darst; Arthur Reid	Amanda Magarian; Mel Chapman	No other competitors	
1997	Cincinnati, OH	Cheryl Marker; Todd Price	Jennifer Darst; Arthur Reid	Amanda Magarian; John Frederiksen	Ilana Goldfogel; Erik Schulz	
1998	Irving, TX	Katie Barnhart; Charles Bernhard IV	Ilana Goldfogel; Erik Schulz	No other competitors		
1999	Bloomington, MN	Larisa Spielberg; Craig Joeright	Christina Connally; Kevin Donovan	No other competitors		
2000	Detroit, MI	Larisa Spielberg; Craig Joeright	Jessica Miller; Jeffrey Weiss	Ashley Wilson; Mel Chapman	Katie Gadkowski; Benjamin Oberman	
2001	No competition held					
2002	Northbrook, IL	Larisa Spielberg; Craig Joeright	Molly Quigley; Bert Cording	Valentina Razskazova; Val Rising-Moore	No other competitors	
2003	Franklin, TN	Tiffany Vise; Laureano Ibarra	Marcy Hinzmann; Steve Hartsell	Kristen Roth; Michael McPherson	No other competitors	
2004	Dallas, TX	Brittany Vise; Nicholas Kole	Marcy Hinzmann; Aaron Parchem	Amy Howerton; Steven Pottenger	Kristen Roth; Michael McPherson	
2005	Fargo, ND	Marcy Hinzmann; Aaron Parchem	Tiffany Vise; Derek Trent	Brooke Castile; Benjamin Okolski	Kristen Roth; Michael McPherson	
2006	Centennial, CO	Tiffany Vise; Derek Trent	Yuko Kawaguchi; Devin Patrick	Willie Traeger; Kostya Emshanov	Stephanie Kuban; Laureano Ibarra	
2007	Pelham, AL	Tiffany Vise; Derek Trent	Brooke Castile; Benjamin Okolski	Stephanie Kuban; Steven Pottenger	Amber Wehrle; Nicholas Kole	
2008	Rochester Hills, MI	Caitlin Yankowskas; John Coughlin	Amber Wehrle; Nicholas Kole	Kendra Moyle; Steven Pottenger	No other competitors	
2009	Sugar Land, TX	Caitlin Yankowskas; John Coughlin	Andrea Best; Trevor Young	Lisa Moore; Justin Gaumond	Kendra Moyle; Steven Pottenger	
2010	Wichita, KS	Andrea Best; Trevor Young	Ameena Sheikh; Aaron VanCleave	Jessica Rose Paetsch; Drew Meekins	Lisa Moore; Justin Gaumond	
2011	Ann Arbor, MI	Molly Aaron; Daniyel Cohen	Becky Bereswill; Trevor Young	Lisa Moore; Justin Gaumond	No other competitors	
2012	No competition held					
2013	Cleveland, OH	Alexa Scimeca; Chris Knierim	DeeDee Leng; Timothy LeDuc	Kiri Baga; Taylor Toth	No other competitors	
2014	No competition held					
2015	Geneva, IL	Olivia Oltmanns; Joshua Santillan	Brianna de la Mora; Taylor Wilson	No other competitors		
2016	Strongsville, OH	Caitlin Fields; Ernie Utah Stevens	Brianna de la Mora; Maxim Kurdukov	No other competitors		
2017	Colorado Springs, CO	Jacquelyn Green; Rique Newby-Estrella	Caitlin Fields; Ernie Utah Stevens	No other competitors		
2018- 2019	No competition held					
2020 (Note: Beginning in 2020, the pairs sectional competition was renamed the U.S. Pairs Final and held alongside a single's sectional championship.)	Allen, TX	Olivia Serafini; Mervin Tran	Jessica Pfund; Joshua Santillan	Laiken Lockley; Keenan Prochnow	Maria Mokhova; Ivan Mokhov	
2021	No competition held due to the COVID-19 pandemic					
2022	No competition held due to the COVID-19 pandemic					
2023	East Lansing, MI	Sonia Baram; Daniel Tioumentsev	Grace Hanns; Danny Neudecker	Linzy Fitzpatrick; Keyton Bearinger	Nina Ouellette; Rique Newby-Estrella	
2024- 2025	No competition held					
2026	East Lansing, MI	Linzy Fitzpatrick; Keyton Bearinger	Sydney Cooke; Matthew Kennedy	No other competitors		

=== Ice dance ===
Senior ice dance event medalists
Year	Location	Gold	Silver	Bronze	Pewter	Ref.
1939	Cleveland, OH	Edith Preusch; Arthur Preusch Jr.	Dorothy Burkholder; Charles McCarthy	Laura Jane Brown; Harry Martin	No pewter medals awarded	
1940					No pewter medals awarded	
1941	Cleveland, OH	Edith Preusch; Arthur Preusch Jr.	Dorothy Burkholder; Charles McCarthy	Katherine Durbrow; Louis Cody	No pewter medals awarded	
1942	Chicago, IL	Dorothy Burkholder; Charles McCarthy	Mary Louise Premer; Arthur Preusch II	Joyce Martinne Lindgren; LeRoy Lindgren	No pewter medals awarded	
1943	Cleveland, OH	Nancy Blair; Michael McGean	Betty Jane Courtright; Peter Girardot	Katherine Durbrow; Louis Cody	No pewter medals awarded	
1944	Cleveland, OH	Nancy Blair; Michael McGean	Janette Ahrens; Arthur Preusch II	Barbara Griffin; Louis Cody	No pewter medals awarded	
1945	Chicago, IL	Kathe Mehl Williams; Robert Swenning	Anne Davies; Carleton Hoffner Jr.	Betty Jean Higgins; Lyman Wakefield Jr.	No pewter medals awarded	
1946	Cleveland, OH	Norma Lee Caine; Vernon Duckett	Ruth Smeby; Matthew Solomon	Dolores McCarter; Richard van der Bosch	No pewter medals awarded	
1947	No competition held				No pewter medals awarded	
1948	Rochester, MN	Nancy Sue Jenkins; Hayes Alan Jenkins	Jane Schellentrager; Riki Bliss	Caryl Johns; Jack Jost	No pewter medals awarded	
1949	Cleveland, OH	Jane Schellentrager; Louis Cody	Kay Crum; Gary Kepler	Renee Clark; William Lang	No pewter medals awarded	
1950- 1959	No competition held				No pewter medals awarded	
1960	Minneapolis, MN	Marilyn Meeker; Larry Pierce	Thomasine Pierce; Roy Speeg	Joan Lee Udelf; John Allen	No pewter medals awarded	
1961	No competition held				No pewter medals awarded	
1962					No pewter medals awarded	
1963	Sioux City, IA	Jo-Anne Leyden; Robert Munz	Mary Anne Kavanaugh; King Cole	No other competitors	No pewter medals awarded	
1964	Detroit, MI				No pewter medals awarded	
1965	No competition held				No pewter medals awarded	
1966	Colorado Springs, CO	Vicki Camper; Gene Heffron	Janet Burhans; Nicholas Burhans	No other competitors	No pewter medals awarded	
1967	Cleveland, OH				No pewter medals awarded	
1968					No pewter medals awarded	
1969	Denver, CO				No pewter medals awarded	
1970	Troy, OH	Kathy West; Paul Spruell	Mary Campbell; Johnny Johns	Ginni Luttenton; Eddie Marshall	No pewter medals awarded	
1971	Rockton, IL	Mary Campbell; Johnny Johns	Gretchen Stuart; Nicholas Volanski	No other competitors	No pewter medals awarded	
1972	Minneapolis, MN	Kathy West; Rollie Arthur	Colleen O'Connor; Jim Millns	Suzy Ogletree; Gerard Lane	No pewter medals awarded	
1973	Denver, CO	Colleen O'Connor; Jim Millns	Suzy Ogletree; Gerard Lane	Elizabeth Blatherwick; Robert Kaine	No pewter medals awarded	
1974	Euclid, OH	Colleen O'Connor; Jim Millns	Liz Blatherwick; Robert Kaine	Myra Chrien; David Chrien	No pewter medals awarded	
1975	Rockton, IL	Jackie Booth; Michael Podmore	Cathy Macri; Tim Hodges	Jennifer Young; Frank Recco	No pewter medals awarded	
1976	Denver, CO	Cathy Macri; Tim Hodges	Jackie Booth; Eric Walden	Kathy Russell; David Hold	No pewter medals awarded	
1977	Cincinnati, OH	Jackie Booth; Tim Hodges	Carol Fox; Richard Dalley	Helen Zinns; David Chrien	No pewter medals awarded	
1978	Mt. Prospect, IL	Carol Fox; Richard Dalley	Bonnie Burnton; Bill Burton	Nancy Berghoff; Eric Walden	No pewter medals awarded	
1979	Colorado Springs, CO	Carol Fox; Richard Dalley	Judy Blumberg; Michael Seibert	Ellen Pulver; Donald Adair	No pewter medals awarded	
1980	Fort Wayne, IN				No pewter medals awarded	
1981	Minneapolis, MN				No pewter medals awarded	
1982	Houston, TX				No pewter medals awarded	
1983	Colorado Springs, CO	Eva Hunyadi; Jay Pinkerton	Lois Luciani; Russ Witherby	No other competitors	No pewter medals awarded	
1984					No pewter medals awarded	
1985	Denver, CO	Lois Luciani; Russ Witherby	Eva Hunyadi; Jay Pinkerton	Kandi Amelon; Alec Binnie	No pewter medals awarded	
1986	Indianapolis, IN	Renee Roca; Donald Adair	Lois Luciani; Russ Witherby	Jodie Balogh; Jerod Swallow	No pewter medals awarded	
1987	Wilmette, IL	Renee Roca; Donald Adair	April Sargent; Russ Witherby	Jodie Balogh; Jerod Swallow	Dorothi Rodek; Robert Nardozza	
1988	Tulsa, OK	Jodie Balogh; Jerod Swallow	Jennifer Benz; Jeffrey Benz	Dorothi Rodek; Robert Nardozza	No other competitors	
1989	Detroit, MI	Renee Roca; James Yorke	Jodie Balogh; Jerod Swallow	Dorothi Rodek; Robert Nardozza	Elizabeth Punsalan; Shawn Rettstatt	
1990	Edina, MN	Elizabeth Punsalan; Jerod Swallow	Elisa Curtis; Robert Nardozza	Jennifer Goolsbee; Shawn Rettstatt	Mimi Wacholder; Bruce Montemayor	
1991	Omaha, NE	Elizabeth Punsalan; Jerod Swallow	Elisa Curtis; Robert Nardozza	Wendy Millette; James Curtis	Hilary Olney; Michael Schroge	
1992	Lakewood, OH	Elizabeth Punsalan; Jerod Swallow	Rachel Mayer; Peter Breen	Kimberly Callahan; Jonathan Stine	Ann-Morton Neale; Robert Peal	
1993	Rockford, IL	Renee Roca; Gorsha Sur	Ann-Morton Neale; Robert Peal	Kimberly Callahan; Jonathan Stine	Cheryl Demkowski; Sean Gales	
1994	Indianapolis, IN	Renee Roca; Gorsha Sur	Julia Bikbova; Robert Peal	Mica Darley; Michael Sklutovsky	Cheryl Demkowski; Sean Gales	
1995	Denver, CO	Kate Robinson; Peter Breen	Julia Bikbova; Robert Peal	Debbie Koegel; Michael Sklutovsky	Nicole Dumonceaux; John Reppucci	
1996	Bloomington, MN	Julia Bikbova; Robert Peal	Kate Robinson; Peter Breen	Eve Chalom; Mathew Gates	Debbie Koegel; Michael Sklutovsky	
1997	Cincinnati, OH	Naomi Lang; Peter Tchernyshev	Margot Contois; Robert Peal	Julia Bikbova; James Swanson	Jayna Cronin; Kurt Dreger	
1998	Irving, TX	Naomi Lang; Peter Tchernyshev	Tiffany Hyden; Paul Frey	No other competitors		
1999- 2001	No competition held					
2002	Northbrook, IL	Melissa Gregory; Denis Petukhov	Crystal Lynn Beckerdite; Rapahel Kelling	No other competitors		
2003	Franklin, TN	Hillary Gibbons; Justin Pekarek	Christina Zepeda; Nicholas Hart	No other competitors		
2004	Dallas, TX	Lydia Manon; Ryan O'Meara	Rebecca Magerovskiy; Sergey Magerovskiy	Alexandra Snyder; Nick Traxler	No other competitors	
2005	No competition held					
2006	Centennial, CO	Jennifer Wester; Daniil Barantsev	Charlotte Maxwell; Nick Traxler	Lindsay Evans; Kevin O'Keefe	No other competitors	
2007	No competition held					
2008	Rochester Hills, MI	Jennifer Wester; Daniil Barantsev	Mauri Gustafson; Joel Dear	Stacy Kim; Jonathan Harris	No other competitors	
2009- 2010	No competition held					
2011	Ann Arbor, MI	Shannon Wingle; Timothy McKernan	Alissandra Aronow; Zachary Donohue	Kseniya Ponomaryova; Raphael Kelling	No other competitors	
2012	Fort Collins, CO	Madison Hubbell; Zachary Donohue	Shannon Wingle; Timothy McKernan	Carina Glastris; Kevin Allison	No other competitors	
2013	Cleveland, OH	Alissandra Aronow; Collin Brubaker	Kristen Nardozzi; Nick Traxler	Kseniya Ponomaryova; Oleg Altukhov	Katie Donaldson; Brock Jacobs	
2014	East Lansing, MI	Alexandra Aldridge; Daniel Eaton	Anastasia Olson; Ian Lorello	Kristen Nardozzi; Nick Traxler	Kseniya Ponomaryova; Oleg Altukhov	
2015	Geneva, IL	Anastasia Olson; Ian Lorello	Charlotte Maxwell; Ryan Devereaux	No other competitors		
2016	Strongsville, OH	Danielle Thomas; Daniel Eaton	Alexandra Aldridge; Matthew Blackmer	No other competitors		
2017	Colorado Springs, CO	Karina Manta; Joseph Johnson	Caitlin Fields; Ernie Utah Stevens	No other competitors		
2018	Bloomington, MN	Alexandra Aldridge; Daniel Eaton	Karina Manta; Joseph Johnson	No other competitors		
2019- 2020	No competition held					
2021	No competition held due to the COVID-19 pandemic					
2022	No competition held due to the COVID-19 pandemic					
2023	No competition held					
2024	Bloomington, MN	Katarina Wolfkostin; Dimitry Tsarevski	Isabella Flores; Ivan Desyatov	Angela Ling; Caleb Wein	Raffaella Koncius; Alexey Shchepetov	
2025	Plano, TX	Annabelle Morozov; Jeffrey Chen	Raffaella Koncius; Alexey Shchepetov	Amy Cui; Jonathan Rogers	Vanessa Pham; Anton Spiridonov	
2026	No competition held					

== Junior medalists ==
=== Men ===
Season	Location	Gold	Silver	Bronze	Pewter	Details
2011	Ann Arbor, MI	Steven Evans	TJ Yang	Timothy Koleto	Ryan Hartley	
2012	Fort Collins, CO	Timothy Koleto	Troy Tomasello	Lukas Kaugars	Ryan Hartley	
2013	Cleveland, OH	Jordan Moeller	Troy Tomasello	Brian Krentz	Lukas Kaugars	
2014	East Lansing, MI	Jordan Moeller	Nicholas Vrdoljak	Chase Belmontes	Daniel Kulenkamp	
2015	Geneva, IL	Alexei Krasnozhon	Chase Belmontes	Tomoki Hiwatashi	Anthony Boucher	
2016	Strongsville, OH	Alexei Krasnozhon	Tomoki Hiwatashi	Chase Belmontes	Anthony Boucher	
2017	Colorado Springs, CO	Camden Pulkinen	Kevin Li	Derek Wagner	Sasha Lunin	
2018	Bloomington, MN	Alex Wellman	Sasha Lunin	Luke Ferrante	Justin Wichmann	
2019	Fort Wayne, IN	Chase Finster	David Shapiro	Alex Wellman	Luke Ferrante	
2020	Allen, TX	David Shapiro	Matthew Nielsen	Chase Finster	Daniel Turchin	
2021- 2022	No competition held					
2023	East Lansing, MI	Beck Strommer	Nhat-Viet Nguyen	Taira Shinohara	Alexander Liu	
2024	Bloomington, MN	Taira Shinohara	Beck Strommer	Antonio Monaco	Lorenzo Elano	
2025	Plano, TX	Kornzeo Elano	Isaac Fulton	Thomas Chen	Alex Tankovic	
2026	East Lansing, MI	Louis Mallane	Alek Tankovic	Thomas Chen	Joshua Snyder	

=== Women ===
Season	Location	Gold	Silver	Bronze	Pewter	Details
2011	Ann Arbor, MI	Lauren Dinh	McKinzie Daniels	Nina Jiang	Ashley Cain	
2012	Fort Collins, CO	Gracie Gold	Barbie Long	Mariah Bell	Hannah Miller	
2013	Cleveland, OH	Barbie Long	Mariah Bell	Amber Glenn	Katia Shpilband	
2014	East Lansing, MI	Amber Glenn	Bradie Tennell	Elena Taylor	Ashley Shin	
2015	Geneva, IL	Vivian Le	Bradie Tennell	Elena Taylor	Paige Rydberg	
2016	Strongsville, OH	Vivian Le	Emily Chan	Paige Rydberg	Shannon Porter	
2017	Colorado Springs, CO	Ashley Lin	Ashley Kim	Shannon Porter	Maxine Bautista	
2018	Bloomington, MN	Hanna Harrell	Jenna Shi	Pooja Kalyan	Angelina Huang	
2019	Fort Wayne, IN	Wren Warne-Jacobsen	Stephanie Ciarochi	Akane Eguchi	Alyssa Rich	
2020	Allen, TX	Calista Choi	Isabella Inthisone	Maryn Pierce	Jessica Lin	
2021- 2022	No competition held					
2023	East Lansing, MI	Adele Zheng	Logan Higase-Chen	Lilah Gibson	Phoebe Stubblefield	
2024	Bloomington, MN	Logan Higase-Chen	Jessica Jurka	Alina Bonillo	Jiaying Ellyse Johnson	
2025	Plano, TX	Emilia Nemirovsky	Jessica Jurka	Jiaying Ellyse Johnson	Ella Cui	
2026	East Lansing, MI	Angela Shao	Jessica Jurka	Anabelle Wilkins	Jiaying Ellyse Johnson	

=== Pairs ===
Season	Location	Gold	Silver	Bronze	Pewter	Details
2011	Ann Arbor, MI	Andrea Poapst / Chris Knierim	Cassie Andrews / Timothy LeDuc	Olivia Oltmanns / Joshua Santillan	Vladyslava Rybka / Matthew Blackmer	
2012	Fort Collins, CO	Madeline Aaron / Max Settlage	Olivia Oltmanns / Joshua Santillan	Brianna de la Mora / Taylor Wilson	No other competitors	
2013	Cleveland, OH	Madeline Aaron / Max Settlage	Brianna de la Mora / Taylor Wilson	No other competitors		
2014	East Lansing, MI	Madeline Aaron / Max Settlage	Aya Takai / Brian Johnson	Kaitlin Budd / Nikita Cheban	Brianna de la Mora / Taylor Wilson	
2015	Geneva, IL	Caitlin Fields / Ernie Utah Stevens	Olivia Allan / Austin Hale	Lindsay Weinstein / Jacob Simon	Kailey Matkin / Justin Highgate-Brutman	
2016	Strongsville, OH	Lindsay Weinstein / Jacob Simon	Meiryla Findley / Austin Hale	Jacquelyn Green / Rique Newby-Estrella	Madeleine Gallagher / Justin Highgate-Brutman	
2017	Colorado Springs, CO	Nica Digerness / Danny Neudecker	Laiken Lockley / Keenan Prochnow	Lindsay Weinstein / Jacob Simon	Hannah Klopstock / Daniel Arsenault	
2018	Bloomington, MN	Audrey Lu / Misha Mitrofanov	Laiken Lockley / Keenan Prochnow	Evelyn Grace Hanns / Kristofer Ogren	Eliana Secunda / Blake Eisenach	
2019	Fort Wayne, IN	Laiken Lockley / Keenan Prochnow	Kate Finster / Balazs Nagy	Isabelle Martins / Ryan Bedard	Evelyn Grace Hanns / Kristofer Ogren	
2020	Allen, TX	Kate Finster / Balazs Nagy	Winter Deardorff / Mikhail Johnson	Anastasiia Smirnova / Danil Siianytsia	Isabelle Martins / Ryan Bedard	
2021- 2022	No competition held					
2023	East Lansing, MI	Ellie Korytek / Timmy Chapman	Naomi Williams / Lachlan Lewer	Lilianna Murray / Jordan Gillette	Olivia Flores / Luke Wang	
2024- 2025	No competition held					
2026	East Lansing, MI	Sophia Jarmoc / Luke Witkowski	Milada Kovar / Jared McPike	Baylen Taich / Nickolai Apter	Gabrielle Kaplan / Carter Griffin	

=== Ice Dance ===
Season	Location	Gold	Silver	Bronze	Pewter	Details
2011	Ann Arbor, MI	Anastasia Olson / Jordan Cowan	Alexandra Aldridge / Daniel Eaton	Heather Buckner / Nicholas Taylor	Carina Glastris / Kevin Allison	
2012	Fort Collins, CO	Amanda Bertsch / Sam Kaplun	Kaitlin Hawayek / Michael Bramante	Jessica Mancini / Tyler Brooks	Jenna Dzierzanowski / Vinny Dispenza	
2013	Cleveland, OH	Kaitlin Hawayek / Jean-Luc Baker	Holly Moore / Daniel Klaber	Hannah Rosinski / Jacob Jaffe	Mackenzie Reid / Christian Erwin	
2014	East Lansing, MI	Holly Moore / Daniel Klaber	Tory Patsis / Joseph Johnson	Olivia Di Iorio / Alex Benoit	Kelsey Barnes / Douglas Stevenson	
2015	Geneva, IL	Elliana Pogrebinsky / Alex Benoit	Holly Moore / Daniel Klaber	Karina Manta / Joseph Johnson	Danielle Thomas / Alexander Martin	
2016	Strongsville, OH	Elliana Pogrebinsky / Alex Benoit	Katherine Grosul / Cameron Colucci	Eliana Gropman / Ian Somerville	Aya Takai / Alexander Martin	
2017	Colorado Springs, CO	Diana Avaz / Val Katsman	Lydia Erdman / Alexey Shchepetov	Cassidy Klopstock / Jacob Schedl	Heidi Washburn / Ilya Yukhimuk	
2018	Bloomington, MN	Avonley Nguyen / Vadym Kolesnik	Isabella Amoia / Luca Becker	Sophia Elder / Christopher Elder	Katarina DelCamp / Maxwell Gart	
2019	Fort Wayne, IN	Eliana Gropman / Ian Somerville	Ella Ales / Daniel Tsarik	Sophia Elder / Christopher Elder	Katarina DelCamp / Maxwell Gart	
2020- 2023	No competition held					
2024	Bloomington, MN	Jenna Hauer / Benjamin Starr	Elliana Peal / Ethan Peal	Caroline Mullen / Brendan Mullen	Olivia Ilin / Dylan Cain	
2025	Plano, TX	Hana Maria Aboian / Daniil Veselukhin	Caroline Mullen / Brendan Mullen	Olivia Ilin / Dylan Cain	Annelise Stapert / Maxim Korotcov	

== Records ==
Records
Discipline	Most championship titles		
Discipline	Skater(s)	No.	Years
Men's singles	Charlie Tickner	4	1974; 1977; 1979-80
Men's singles	David Santee	4	1973; 1975; 1978; 1981
Men's singles	Jordan Moeller	4	2015; 2017; 2019-20
Women's singles	Tonia Kwiatkowski	5	1990-91; 1993; 1995; 1998
Pairs	Natalie Seybold; Wayne Seybold	4	1983; 1985-86; 1988
Ice dance	Renée Roca (Note: Renée Roca won two championship titles while partnered with Donald Adair (1986-87), one with James Yorke (1989), and two with Gorsha Sur (1993-94).)	5	1986-87; 1989; 1993-94
