= 1984 U.S. Figure Skating Championships =

Figure skating competition

- Type: National Championship
- Date: January
- Season: 1983–84
- Location: Salt Lake City, Utah
- Previous: 1983 U.S. Championships
- Next: 1985 U.S. Championships

The 1984 U.S. Figure Skating Championships took place in Salt Lake City, Utah. Medals were awarded in three colors: gold (first), silver (second), and bronze (third) in four disciplines – men's singles, ladies' singles, pair skating, and ice dancing – across three levels: senior, junior, and novice.

The event determined the U.S. teams for the 1984 Winter Olympics and 1984 World Championships.

== Senior results ==
=== Men ===
Rank	Name	CF	SP	FS
1	Scott Hamilton	1	1	1
2	Brian Boitano	2	2	2
3	Mark Cockerell	4	3	3
4	Paul Wylie	5	4	4
5	Tom Dickson	3	5	7
6	Daniel Doran	6	8	5
7	Scott Williams	7	10	6
8	Bobby Beauchamp	8	6	9
9	Christopher Bowman	11	9	8
10	Craig Henderson	13	11	10
11	James Santee	9	7	15
12	Scott Driscoll	12	13	11
13	James Cygan	10	14	14
14	Angelo D'Agostino	15	12	12
15	Adam Leib	14	15	13

=== Ladies ===
Rank	Name	CF	SP	FS
1	Rosalynn Sumners	1	2	2
2	Tiffany Chin	4	1	1
3	Elaine Zayak	2	3	3
4	Jill Frost	3	4	4
5	Kathryn Adams	6	6	6
6	Debi Thomas	9	5	5
7	Sara MacInnes	10	11	8
8	Yvonne Gómez	15	7	7
9	Maradith Feinberg	5	9	13
10	Kelly Webster	7	14	11
11	Jennifer Newman	13	8	10
12	Leslie Sikes	11	15	9
13	Stacy McMullin	12	10	12
14	Cynthia Romano	8	12	15
15	Caroline Silby	14	13	14
WD	Vikki de Vries			

=== Pairs ===
Rank	Name	SP	FS
1	Kitty Carruthers / Peter Carruthers	1	1
2	Lee Ann Miller / William Fauver	2	2
3	Jill Watson / Burt Lancon	3	3
4	Gillian Wachsman / Robert Daw	4	4
5	Natalie Seybold / Wayne Seybold	8	5
6	Lynne Freeman / Jay Freeman	6	6
7	Katy Keeley / Gary Kemp	7	7
8	Susan Dungjen / Jason Dungjen	5	8
9	Maria Lako / Michael Blicharski	10	9
10	Margo Shoup / Patrick Page	9	10
11	Debra Fahy / Craig Maurizi	13	11
12	Stacey Gaker / Richard Hartley	12	12
13	Sandy Hurtubise / Karl Kurtz	11	14
14	Sheila Nobles / Joshua Roberts	14	13
15	Paula Obdyke / Craig Gill	15	15

=== Ice dancing ===
Rank	Name	CD	OSP	FD
1	Judy Blumberg / Michael Seibert	1	1	1
2	Carol Fox / Richard Dalley	2	2	2
3	Elisa Spitz / Scott Gregory	3	3	3
4	Renée Roca / Donald Adair	4	4	4
5	Susan Wynne / Joseph Druar	5	5	5
6	Susan Jorgensen / Robert Yokabaskas	6	6	6
7	Lois Luciani / Russ Witherby	7	7	7
8	Eva Hunyadi / Jay Pinkerton	8	8	8
9	Kristan Lowery / Charles "Chip" Rossbach	10	10	9
10	Eleanor DeVera / James Yorke	9	9	10
11	Margaret Bodo / Rick Berg	12	12	11
12	Kandi Amelon / Alec Binnie	11	11	12
13	Karen Knieriem / Leif Erickson	13	13	13

== Junior results ==
=== Men ===
Rank	Name	CF	SP	FS
1	William Lawe	1	1	3
2	Winfrid Mayer	2	9	2
3	Doug Mattis	3	3	4
4	John Saitta	10	4	1
5	Rudy Galindo	4	2	7
6	Thomas Cerniak	5	6	6
7	Scott Kurttila	11	5	5
8	Erik Larson	9	7	8
9	Scott Wendland	7	10	9
10	Jeff Freedman	6	11	13
11	Todd Reynolds	8	12	12
12	Craig Leopold	13	8	11
13	Steven Rice	14	14	10
14	Rocky Marval	12	13	14

=== Ladies ===
Rank	Name	CF	SP	FS
1	Allison Oki	2	1	3
2	Tracey Ernst	4	5	2
3	Jana Sjodin	1	2	5
4	Jill Trenary	10	4	1
5	Valory Vennes	3	8	7
6	Tonya Harding	9	8	4
7	Laura Steele	9	6	6
8	D're Anderson	6	7	8
9	Laura-Ann Edmunds	7	3	9
10	Andrea Key	5	10	10
11	Michelle McMahon	11	11	11

=== Pairs ===
Rank	Name	SP	FS
1	Ginger Tse / Archie Tse	2	1
2	Jeannine Jones / Tony Jones	1	2
3	Tammy Crowson / Joseph Mero	3	3
4	Jan Waggoner / Todd Waggoner	5	4
5	Kellee Murchison / David McGovern	4	6
6	Shelly Propson / Jerod Swallow	9	5
7	Deveny Deck / Kevin Polt	6	7
8	Karen Courtland / Robert Davenport	7	8
9	Michella Dudley / Bobby Davis	8	9
10	Tammy Purcell / Jeff Smith	10	10
11	Susanne Steiner / Stephen Kennedy	11	11
12	Lynn Lindborg / Bob Pellaton	12	12

=== Ice dancing ===
Rank	Name	Factored Placements	CD1	CD2	OD	FD
1	Christina Yatsuhashi / Keith Yatsuhashi	2.0	1	1	1	1
2	April Sargent / John D'Amelio	4.0	2	2	2	2
3	Dorothy Rodek / Robert Nordozza	6.0	3	3	3	3
4	Jill Heiser / Michael Verlich	8.0	4	4	4	4
5	Jodie Balogh / Jerod Swallow	10.0	5	5	5	5
6	Suzanne Murphy / Andrew Niebler	12.0	6	6	6	6
7	Kimberly Barget / James Schilling	14.0	7	7	7	7
8	Wendy Hillier / Christopher Macri	16.0	8	8	8	8
9	Colleen Boman / Doug Murray	18.0	9	9	9	9
10	Sharon Minton / Joe Golias	20.0	10	10	10	10
11	Andrea Schmidt / William Kimel	21.0	11	11	11	11
