= 1982 U.S. Figure Skating Championships =

Figure skating competition

- Type: National Championship
- Date: January
- Season: 1981–82
- Location: Indianapolis, Indiana
- Previous: 1981 U.S. Championships
- Next: 1983 U.S. Championships

The 1982 U.S. Figure Skating Championships took place in Indianapolis, Indiana, from January 26 to January 31. Medals were awarded in three colors: gold (first), silver (second), and bronze (third) in four disciplines – men's singles, ladies' singles, pair skating, and ice dancing – across three levels: senior, junior, and novice.

The event determined the U.S. team for the 1982 World Championships.

== Senior results ==
=== Men ===
Rank	Name	CF	SP	FS
1	Scott Hamilton	1	2	1
2	Robert Wagenhoffer	5	1	2
3	David Santee	2	4	4
4	Brian Boitano	6	3	3
5	Mark Cockerell	3	5	6
6	James Santee	8	7	5
7	Bobby Beauchamp	9	6	7
8	Tom Dickson	4	11	10
9	James White	7	8	11
10	Scott Williams	11	12	8
11	Paul Wylie	13	9	9
12	Adam Lieb	10	10	12
13	John Filbig	12	13	13

=== Ladies ===
Rank	Name	CF	SP	FS
1	Rosalynn Sumners	5	1	1
2	Vikki de Vries	4	2	2
3	Elaine Zayak	2	3	3
4	Jacki Farrell	3	6	5
5	Tiffany Chin	6	5	4
6	Priscilla Hill	1	4	8
7	Jill Frost	7	8	6
8	Simone Grigorescu	8	7	9
9	Kelly Webster	10	7	7
10	Melissa Thomas	9	9	10

=== Pairs ===
Rank	Name	SP	FS
1	Kitty Carruthers / Peter Carruthers	1	1
2	Maria DiDomenico / Burt Lancon	3	2
3	Lee Ann Miller / William Fauver	2	3
4	Vicki Heasley / Peter Oppegard	4	4
5	Lynne Freeman / Jay Freeman	5	5
6	Maryan Amaral / Bryan Amaral	6	6
7	Karyl Kawaichi / Larry Schrier	8	7
8	Cara Gill / Craig Gill	7	8
9	Dawn Roberge / Dale Roberge	9	9

=== Ice dancing ===
Rank	Name	CD	OD	FD
1	Judy Blumberg / Michael Seibert	1	1	1
2	Carol Fox / Richard Dalley	2	2	2
3	Elisa Spitz / Scott Gregory	3	3	3
4	Kim Krohn / Barry Hagan	4	4	4
5	Nancy Berghoff / James Bowser	5	5	5
6	Renée Roca / Donald Adair	6	6	6
7	Janice Kindrachuk / Blake Hobson	7	7	7
8	Terri Slater / Rick Berg	8	8	8
9	Susan Wynne / Joseph Druar	9	9	9
10	Eva Hunyadi / Jay Pinkerton	10	10	10
11	Robi Shepard / Kelly Witt	11	11	11
12	Susan Jorgensen / Robert Yokabaskas	12	12	12
13	M. Sonja Kenney / David F. Hold	13	13	13
14	Karen Knieriem / Philip Piasecki	14	14	14

== Junior results ==
=== Men ===
Rank	Name	CF	SP	FS
1	James Cygan	1	1	2
2	Daniel Doran	3	4	1
3	Christopher Bowman	2	6	3
4	Joseph Mero	8	2	5
5	Craig Henderson	5	5	6
6	Angelo D'Agostino	9	8	4
7	Erik Larson	6	7	8
8	David L. Jamison	7	10	7
9	David Fedor	4	9	10
10	John-Paul Licari	10	3	9

=== Ladies ===
Rank	Name	CF	SP	FS
1	Lorilee Pritchard	2	2	1
2	Staci McMullin	3	1	2
3	Kathy Rissmiller	4	3	3
4	Tracy Moore	1	4	5
5	Rosanna Tovi	5	5	4
6	Linda Marie Anderson	6	6	7
7	Kathleen Haines	8	8	6
8	Wendy Lee Weston	7	7	9
9	Michele Muramoto	9	9	8

=== Pairs ===
Rank	Name	SP	FS
1	Natalie Seybold / Wayne Seybold	1	1
2	Susan Dungjen / Jason Dungjen	3	2
3	Amy Lynn Grossman / Robert Davenport	2	4
4	Debra Fahy / Craig Maurizi	5	3
5	Kelly Abolt / Kevin Peeks	4	5
6	Loreen Koshi / Doug Williams	7	6
7	Suzannah Nolt / Jeffrey Nolt	6	7
8	Maria Lako / Kevin Bryzek	8	8
9	Diana Leigh Evans / Steve Aronson	9	9
10	Margo Shoup / Gary Kemp	10	10

=== Ice dancing ===
Rank	Name	CD	OD	FD
1	Amanda Newman / Jerry Santoferrara	1	1	1
2	Lynda Malek / Alexander Miller	2	2	2
3	Kristan Lowery / Chip Rossbach,	4	3	3
4	Kandi Amelon / Alec Binnie	3	4	4
5	Colleen McGuire / William Lyons III	5	5	5
6	Kimberly Hasler / David Purves	6	6	6
7	Christina Yatsuhashi / Keith Yatsuhashi	7	7	7
8	Kelli Haveman / Tom Rosenbaum	8	8	8
9	Dorothy Rodek / Robert Nardozza	9	9	9
