= 1983 U.S. Figure Skating Championships =

Figure skating competition

- Type: National Championship
- Date: February
- Season: 1982–83
- Location: Pittsburgh, Pennsylvania
- Venue: Pittsburgh Civic Arena
- Previous: 1982 U.S. Championships
- Next: 1984 U.S. Championships

The 1983 U.S. Figure Skating Championships took place at Pittsburgh Civic Arena in Pittsburgh, Pennsylvania, with the female champion crowned February 3, 1983, and male champion crowned February 4, 1983. Medals were awarded in three colors: gold (first), silver (second), and bronze (third) in four disciplines – men's singles, ladies' singles, pair skating, and ice dancing – across three levels: senior, junior, and novice.

The event determined the U.S. team for the 1983 World Championships.

== Senior results ==
=== Men ===
Rank	Name	CF	SP	FS
1	Scott Hamilton	1	1	1
2	Brian Boitano	2	2	2
3	Mark Cockerell	3	3	3
4	Bobby Beauchamp	4	4	5
5	Paul Wylie	6	5	4
6	Scott Williams	8	6	6
7	Tom Dickson	5	7	8
8	J. Scott Driscoll	7	8	7
9	James White	10	9	9
10	James Cygan	8	10	11
11	Robert Rosenbluth	11	11	10

=== Ladies ===
Rank	Name	CF	SP	FS
1	Rosalynn Sumners	2	1	1
2	Elaine Zayak	4	3	2
3	Tiffany Chin	5	4	3
4	Vikki de Vries	3	2	5
5	Melissa Thomas	1	6	6
6	Kelly Webster	7	5	4
7	Jill Frost	8	7	7
8	Jacki Farrell	6	8	8
9	Staci McMullin	12	9	9
10	Jennifer Newman	11	11	10
11	Leslie Sikes	9	10	13
12	Maradith Feinberg	10	15	11
13	Debi Thomas	15	12	12
14	Caroline Silby	13	13	14
15	Maria Causey	14	14	15

=== Pairs ===
Rank	Name	SP	FS
1	Kitty Carruthers / Peter Carruthers	1	1
2	Lea Ann Miller / William Fauver	3	2
3	Jill Watson / Burt Lancon	2	3
4	Gillian Wachsman / Robert Daw	4	4
5	Lynne Freeman / Jay Freeman	6	5
6	Katy Keeley / Gary Kemp	7	6
7	Maria DiDomenico / Peter Oppergard	5	7
8	Debra Fahy / Craig Maurizi	8	8
9	Natalie Seybold / Wayne Seybold	9	9
10	Cara Gill / Craig Gill	11	10
11	Kimberly Barget / Ronald Holbrook	12	11
12	Margo Shoup / Patrick Page	10	12

=== Ice dancing ===
Rank	Name	CD	OD	FD
1	Judy Blumberg / Michael Seibert	1	1	1
2	Elisa Spitz / Scott Gregory	2	2	2
3	Carol Fox / Richard Dalley	3	3	3
4	Renée Roca / Donald Adair	4	4	4
5	Susan Wynne / Joseph Druar	5	5	5
6	Susan Jorgensen / Robert Yokabaskas	6	6	6
7	Eleanor De Vera / James Yorke	7	7	7
8	Eva Hunyadi / Jay Pinkerton	8	8	8
9	Lois Luciani / Russ Witherby	9	9	9
10	Karen Knieriem / Philip Piasecki	10	10	10
11	Robi Shepard / Kelly Witt	11	11	11
12	Sandra McGee / Frank Summers	12	12	12

== Junior results ==
=== Men ===
Rank	Name	CF	SP	FS
1	Christopher Bowman	1	2	2
2	Angelo D'Agostino	4	5	1
3	Daniel Doran	2	7	3
4	David Fedor	3	1	7
5	Craig Henderson	6	10	4
6	David Jamison	9	3	5
7	John Paul Licari	8	4	6
8	Doug Mattis	5	6	9
9	Erik Larson	11	11	8
10	Billy Lawe	7	12	11
11	Scott Kurtilla	12	8	10
12	Tom Zakrajsek	10	9	12
13	Scott Wendland	13	13	13

=== Ladies ===
Rank	Name	CF	SP	FS
1	Kathryn Adams	1	1	1
2	Yvonne Gómez	6	2	2
3	Rosanna Tovi	3	4	3
4	Sara MacInnes	2	6	4
5	Vicki Singer	4	5	6
6	Kathy Rissmiller	8	3	5
7	Jana Sjodin	5	8	7
8	Valory Vennes	9	7	8
9	Wendy Lee Weston	7	10	10
7	Laura-Ann Edmunds	10	9	9

=== Pairs ===
Rank	Name	SP	FS
1	Susan Dungjen / Jason Dungjen	1	1
2	Sandy Hurtubise / Karl Kurtz	2	2
3	Sue Falzone / Michael Blicharski	3	3
4	Loreen Koshi / Doug Williams	4	5
5	Maria Lako / Joseph Mero	7	4
6	Jan Waggoner / Todd Waggoner	6	6
7	Jeannine Jones / Tony Jones	5	7
8	Michelle Dudley / Bobby Davis	10	8
9	Erin O'Neill / Buzzie O'Neill	8	9
10	Kellee Murchison / David McGovern	9	10
11	Susanne Steiner / Stephen Kennedy	11	11

=== Ice dancing ===
Rank	Name	CD	OD	FD
1	Suzanne Semanick / Alexander Miller	1	1	1
2	Kandi Amelon / Alec Binnie	3	2	2
3	Colleen McGuire --> / William Lyons III	2	4	3
4	Christina Yatsuhashi / Keith Yatsuhashi	4	2	4
5	Kristan Lowery / Chip Rossbach	5	6	5
6	Dorothy Rodek / Robert Nardozza	6	5	6
7	Laura Wolfe / John Stackhoue	7	7	7
8	Monika Gerhauser / Andrew Niebler	8	8	8
9	Jessica Campbell / Glenn Cummings	10	11	9
10	April Sargent / John D'Amelio	9	10	10
11	Wendy Hilliers / Christopher Nacri	11	9	11
12	Colette Huber / Bob Tiernan	12	12	12

== Sources ==
- Swift, E.M. (February 14, 1983). "The Thinner was the Winner". Sports Illustrated. Vol. 58, no. 6. p. 75. Archived from the original on October 25, 2020.
