= 1985 U.S. Figure Skating Championships =

Figure skating competition

- Type: National Championship
- Season: 1984–85
- Location: Kansas City, Missouri

Champions
- Men's singles: Brian Boitano
- Ladies' singles: Tiffany Chin
- Pairs: Jill Watson / Peter Oppegard
- Ice dance: Judy Blumberg / Michael Seibert
- Previous: 1984 U.S. Championships
- Next: 1986 U.S. Championships

The 1985 U.S. Figure Skating Championships was held in early 1985 at Kemper Arena in Kansas City, Missouri. Medals were awarded in four colors: gold (first), silver (second), bronze (third), and pewter (fourth) in four disciplines – men's singles, ladies' singles, pair skating, and ice dancing – across three levels: senior, junior, and novice.

The event was one of the criteria used to select the U.S. teams for the 1985 World Championships.

== Senior results ==
=== Men ===
Following the retirement of Olympic gold medalist Scott Hamilton, Brian Boitano landed seven triple jumps in the free skating to capture his first national title. Mark Cockerell, appearing in his ninth nationals, finished a career-best second, and Christopher Bowman moved up from eighth to fourth with an outstanding free skating.

Boitano would go on to capture the bronze medal at the 1985 World Championships.

Rank	Name	CF	SP	FS
1	Brian Boitano	1	1	1
2	Mark Cockerell	2	2	2
3	Scott Williams	3	9	4
4	Christopher Bowman	10	3	3
5	Paul Wylie	4	6	6
6	Daniel Doran	7	7	5
7	Bobby Beauchamp	5	4	8
8	Craig Henderson	6	8	7
9	Angelo D'Agostino	12	5	9
10	David Fedor	9	11	10
11	James Cygan	8	12	12
12	John Filbig	14	11	14
13	Tom Cierniak	13	10	13
14	Tom Zakrajsek	14	13	14
15	Winfrid Mayer	15	15	15

=== Ladies ===
Coming off a fourth-place finish at the 1984 Winter Olympics, Tiffany Chin was the heavy favorite and won all three phases of the competition to capture the crown. Second place finisher Debi Thomas became the first black American singles skater to qualify for the World Figure Skating Championships.

Chin would go on to win the bronze medal at the 1985 World Championships, while Thomas finished fifth in her World debut.

Rank	Name	CF	SP	FS
1	Tiffany Chin	1	1	1
2	Debi Thomas	2	2	3
3	Caryn Kadavy	5	3	2
4	Kathryn Adams	7	4	4
5	Jill Frost	3	7	6
6	Leslie Sikes	8	8	7
7	Jana Marie Sjodin	4	12	8
8	Yvonne Gomez	11	13	5
9	Sara MacInnes	6	5	14
10	Tracy Ernst	14	6	9
11	Staci McMullin	12	9	10
12	Maradith Feinberg	9	11	13
13	Debbie Walls	13	10	12
14	Leslie Friedman	10	14	15
15	Debbie Tucker	16	16	11
16	Cynthia Romano	15	15	16

=== Pairs ===
After her previous partner, Burt Lancon, turned professional, 1984 Olympian Jill Watson teamed with Peter Oppegard to take the pairs crown. They were followed in second place by siblings Natalie and Wayne Seybold.

Watson and Oppegard would finish fourth in the 1985 World Championships.

Rank	Name	SP	FP
1	Jill Watson / Peter Oppegard	1	1
2	Natalie Seybold / Wayne Seybold	2	2
3	Gillian Wachsman / Todd Waggoner	4	3
4	Susan Dungjen / Jason Dungjen	7	4
5	Katy Keeley / Joseph Mero	3	6
6	Sandy Hurtubise / Craig Maurizi	8	5
7	Maria Lako / Michael Blicharski	6	7
8	Karen Courtland / Robert Daw	5	9
9	Tammy Crowson / Jay Freeman	9	8
10	Ginger Tse / Archie Tse	12	10
11	Kristin Kriwanek / Doug Williams	10	11
12	Sheila Nobles / Tom Zakrajsek	14	12
13	Danielle Broussard / Christopher Hefner	13	13
WD	Margo Shoup / Patrick Page		

=== Ice dancing ===
Judy Blumberg / Michael Seibert won their fifth consecutive national title and would go on to earn the bronze medal at the 1985 World Championships.

Rank	Name
1	Judy Blumberg / Michael Seibert
2	Renée Roca / Donald Adair
3	Suzanne Semanick / Scott Gregory
4	Lois Luciani / Russ Witherby
5	Susan Wynne / Joseph Druar
6	Susan Jorgensen / Robert Yokabaskas
7	Eva Hunyardi / Jay Pinkerton
8	Kristan Lowry / Chip Rossbach
9	Kandi Amelon / Alex Binnie
10	April Sargent / John D'Amelio
11	Karen Knieriem / Leif Erickson
12	Ann Hensel / John Stackhouse
13	Laura Wolfe / James Yorke
14	Sharon Minton / Kenton Webb

== Junior results ==
=== Men ===
Rank	Name	CF	SP	FS
1	Doug Mattis	1	2	3
2	Erik Larson	5	3	1
3	Rudy Galindo	3	4	2
4	Scott Kurttila	2	1	4
5	John Saitta	4	5	5
6	Patrick Brault			6
7	Jeff Carstensen			8
8	Brian Grant			9
9	Jeff Freedman			11
10	Eddie Shipstad			10
11	Mark Mitchell			7
12	Todd Reynolds			13
13	Steven Rice			12
14	Jon De Paz			14

=== Ladies ===
Rank	Name	CF	SP	FS
1	Jill Trenary	5	5	1
2	Tracey Damigella	3 (tie)	6	2
3	Holly Cook	6	3	3
4	Dedie Richards	2	4	5
5	Tracey Seliga	1	7	8
6	Sharon Barker	8	8	4
7	Jeri Campbell	9	1	7
8	Laura Edmunds	7	11	6
9	Micki McMahon	13	2	9
10	Kimberly Drenser	3 (tie)	13	11
11	Lisa Cornelius			10
12	Kristin Kriwanek			12
WD	Julie Wasserman			

=== Pairs ===
(incomplete standings)

Rank	Name
1	Deveny Deck / Luke Hohmann
2	Shelly Propson / Jerod Swallow
3	Lori Blasko / Todd Sand
4	Shanda Smith / Brandon Smith
5	Kristi Yamaguchi / Rudy Galindo
6	Bridgit Drenser / David McGovern
7	Ashley Stevenson / Robert Pellaton
8	Jennifer Newman / Scott Wedland
9	Jill Kombeitz / Joel McKeever
10	Sara Powell / Robert Powell
11	Nancy Kerrigan / Bobby Martin
12	Nancy Schwarz / David Aboyoun
13	Deirdre Roach / Mike Beltch
14	Pam Warters / Jeff Warters

=== Ice dancing ===
Rank	Name
1	Jodie Balogh / Jerod Swallow
2	Tonia Kleinsasser / Daniel Stahl
3	Jill Helser / Michael Verlich
4	Tracy Sniadach / Charles Sinek
5	SKimberly Barget / James Schilling
6	Jeanne Miley / Christopher Macri
7	Amy Webster / John Millier
8	Colette Huber / Ron Kravette
9	Colleen Bowman / Doug Murray
10	Suzanne Murphy / Andrew Niebler
11	Jennifer Benz / Jeffrey Benz
12	Lisa Grove / Daniel Smith
13	Megan O'Donnell / David Shirt
14	Kelli Haveman / Shawn Rettstatt

== Novice results ==
Todd Eldredge and Katie Wood took gold in the novice men's and ladies' categories, respectively.

=== Men ===
(incomplete standings)

Rank	Name
1	Todd Eldredge
2	Aren Nielsen
3	Alex Chang
4	Cameron Birky
5	Colin Vander Veen
6	Brian Rabin
7	Grant Noroyan
8	Shepherd Clark
9	Tim Dever
10	Doug Webster

=== Ladies ===
(incomplete standings)

Rank	Name
1	Katie Wood
2	Cindy Bortz
3	Kyoko Ina
4	Kristi Yamaguchi
5	Kenna Bailey
6	Dena Galech
7	Dawn Latona
8	Shenon Badre
9	Nancy Kerrigan
10	Jill Weisenstein
