= 1986 U.S. Figure Skating Championships =

Figure skating competition

- Type: National Championship
- Date: February
- Season: 1985–86
- Location: Uniondale, New York

Champions
- Men's singles: Brian Boitano
- Ladies' singles: Debi Thomas
- Pairs: Gillian Wachsman / Todd Waggoner
- Ice dance: Renée Roca / Donald Adair
- Previous: 1985 U.S. Championships
- Next: 1987 U.S. Championships

The 1986 U.S. Figure Skating Championships was held in early February 1986 in Uniondale, New York. Medals were awarded in four colors: gold (first), silver (second), bronze (third), and pewter (fourth) in four disciplines – men's singles, ladies' singles, pair skating, and ice dancing – across three levels: senior, junior, and novice.

The event was one of the criteria used to select the U.S. teams for the 1986 World Championships.

== Senior results ==
=== Men ===
Rank	Name	CF	SP	FS
1	Brian Boitano	1	1	1
2	Scott Williams	3	2	4
3	Daniel Doran	5	6	2
4	Angelo D'Agostino	9	5	2
5	Paul Wylie	7	4	6
6	James Cygan	8	7	5
7	Doug Mattis	4	8	7
8	Craig Henderson	6	13	8
9	Scott Kurttila	10	11	9
10	Bobby Beauchamp	12	10	10
11	John Filbig	11	9	11
12	Tom Zakrajsek	13	12	13
13	Todd Reynolds	14	16	12
14	Steven Rice	15	15	14
15	David Jamison	16	14	15
WD	Christopher Bowman	2	3	

=== Ladies ===
Rank	Name	CF	SP	FS
1	Debi Thomas	1	2	1
2	Caryn Kadavy	3	1	2
3	Tiffany Chin	2	3	3
4	Tracey Damigella	4	6	4
5	Jill Trenary	6	4	5
6	Tonya Harding	12	5	6
7	Yvonne Gomez	9	7	7
8	Kelly Ann Szmurlo	7	8	9
9	Leslie Sikes	8	9	10
10	Holly Cook	11	10	8
11	Tracey Seliga	5	13	14
12	Kathryn Adams	13	14	11
13	Debbie Tucker	17	11	12
14	Kimberly Drenser	15	12	13
15	Kris Morzinski	10	17	15
16	Debbie LaVerde	16	15	16
WD	Debbie Walls	14	16	
WD	Jana Sjodin			

=== Pairs ===
Shelly Propson and Jerod Swallow withdrew after she fell on her head during a lift in a practice session on February 6.

Rank	Name	TFP	SP	FP
1	Gillian Wachsman / Todd Waggoner	1.4	1	1
2	Jill Watson / Peter Oppegard	2.8	2	2
3	Natalie Seybold / Wayne Seybold	4.6	4	3
4	Katy Keeley / Joseph Mero	5.2	3	4
5	Maradith Feinberg / Craig Maurizi	7.8	7	5
6	Susan Dungjen / Jason Dungjen	9.2	8	6
7	Lori Blasko / Todd Sand	9.4	6	7
8	Kellee Murchison / Robert Pellaton	11.6	9	8
9	Ginger Tse / Archie Tse	14.0	10	10
10	Kristen Kriwanek / Doug Williams	15.0	15	9
11	Karen Courtland / Robert Daw	15.0	5	13
12	Elaine Asanakis / Christopher Hefner	16.4	11	12
13	Deveny Deck / Luke Hohmann	16.6	14	11
14	April Malakoff / Karl Kurtz	19.2	13	14
15	Heidi Franks / Tony Jones	21.4	16	15
WD	Shelly Propson / Jerod Swallow		12	

=== Ice dancing ===
Rank	Name	CDs	OSP	FD
1	Renée Roca / Donald Adair	1	2	1
2	Suzanne Semanick / Scott Gregory	2	1	2
3	Lois Luciani / Russ Witherby	3	3	3
4	Susan Wynne / Joseph Druar	4	4	4
5	Kristan Lowery / Chip Rossbach	5	5	5
6	April Sargent / John D'Amelio	6	6	6
7	Karen Knieriem / Leif Erickson	7	7	7
8	Dorothi Rodek / Robert Nardozza	8	8	8
9	Jill Heiser / Michael Verlich	10	10	9
10	Josie Balogh / Jerod Swallow	9	9	10
11	Laura Everngam / Jerry Santoferrara	11	11	11
WD	Ann Hensel / James Yorke	12	12	12

== Junior results ==
=== Men ===
Rank	Name	CF	SP	FS
1	Mark Mitchell	4	1	
2	Erik Larson	2		
3	Rudy Galindo	1	2	
4	Eddie Shipstad	3		
5	Todd Eldredge	6		
6	Patrick Brault	13		
7	Craig Heath	9		
8	Brian Grant	8		
9	John Liotta	5		
10	Bryan Rabin	15		
11	Alex Chang	11		
12	Joel McKeever	7		
13	Mark Alexander	10		
14	David Liu	12		
15	John Denton	14		

=== Ladies ===
Rank	Name	CF	SP	FS
1	Cindy Bortz			
2	Julie Wasserman			
3	E. Rory Flack	2		
4	Kristi Yamaguchi			
5	Tonia Kwiatkowski			
6	Carrie Weber			
7	Jeri Campbell			
8	Tracie Brown	1		
9	Dena Galech			
10	Jenni Meno			
11	Nancy Kerrigan			
12	Lily Lyoonjung Lee			
13	Sharon Barker			

=== Pairs ===
Rank	Name
1	Kristi Yamaguchi / Rudy Galindo
2	Ashley Stevenson / Scott Wendland
3	Shanda Smith / Brandon Smith
4	Laurie Snyder / David McGovern
5	Jill Kombeitz / Joel McKeever
6	Paula Visingardi / Jeffrey Meyers
7	Sara Powell / Robert Powell
8	Christine Kopp / Richard Scarry
9	Julianne Thompson / Brian Geddeis
10	Wendy Weston / David Goodman
11	Anne Marie Wells / Brian Wells
12	Annette Abel / William Abel

=== Ice dancing ===
Rank	Name
1	Colette Huber / Ron Kravette
2	Lisa Grove / Charles Sinek
3	Kimberly Barget / James Schilling
4	Jennifer Benz / Jeffrey Benz
5	Ann-Morton Neale / Dee J. Pascoe
6	Elizabeth Punsalan / David Shirk
7	Jeanne Miley / Christopher Macri
8	Jennifer Goolsbee / Peter Chupa
9	Tina Marshall / David Low
10	Monique Barela / Jim Sun
11	K.C. Watkins / Duane Greenleaf
12	Katrina Stader / Stephen Laumann
WD	Amy Webster / John Millier

== Novice results ==
=== Men ===
Rank	Name	CF	SP	FS
1	Cameron Birky	3		
2	Scott Davis	4		
3	Shepherd Clark	5		
4	Colin Van der Veen	2		
5	Damon Allen	1		
6	Christian Hendricks	7		
7	Thomas Jasper	8		
8	Timothy Dever	6		
9	John Baldwin Jr.	11		
10	Pete Robinson	12		
11	Robert Morris Jr.	10		
12	David Warnke	9		

=== Ladies ===
Rank	Name	CF	SP	FS
1	Liane Moscato	1		
2	Karen Terry	3		
3	Elizabeth Wright	2		
4	Mary Ann Morgan	4		
5	Kate Hollister	5		
6	Dawn Duhamel	6		
7	Tarah Donelan	7		
8	Shannon Kardos	8		
9	Berkley Villard	10		
10	Jennifer Anderson	9		
11	Rachel Gibson	12		
12	Melia Heimbuck	11		
