= Agnes Zawadzki =

American figure skater (born 1994)

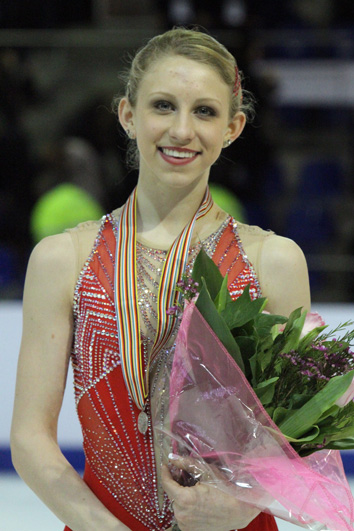
- Zawadzki in 2010

Personal information
- Full name: Agnes Elizabeth Zawadzki
- Born: July 31, 1994 (age 32) Chicago, Illinois, U.S.
- Height: 5 ft 7 in (1.70 m)

Figure skating career
- Country: United States
- Coach: Tom Zakrajsek
- Skating club: Broadmoor SC
- Began skating: 1999
- Retired: 2014?
Medal record
Figure skating: Ladies' singles
Representing United States
U.S. National Championships
Bronze medal – third place	2013 Omaha	Ladies' singles
Bronze medal – third place	2012 San Jose	Ladies' singles
World Junior Championships
Bronze medal – third place	2011 Gangneung	Ladies' singles
Silver medal – second place	2010 The Hague	Ladies' singles

Agnes Elizabeth Zawadzki (born July 31, 1994) is an American former competitive figure skater. She is the 2012 Rostelecom Cup bronze medalist and a two-time U.S. national bronze medalist (2012, 2013). As a junior, she was a two-time World Junior medalist (2010 silver, 2011 bronze) and the 2010 U.S. national junior champion.

== Personal life ==
Zawadzki's parents, originally from Gdańsk and southern Poland, moved to the United States in the early 1990s and divorced when she was three. After her father died from a drug and alcohol overdose when she was 10, Zawadzki's mother worked double shifts as a nanny and housekeeper to support her skating. She has an older brother, Bart.

Zawadzki attended Cheyenne Mountain High School, graduating in May 2012. She was the recipient of an outstanding academic achievement award signed by President George W. Bush. A poem she wrote in sixth grade was published in Anthology of Poetry by Young Americans. She also went to Chippewa Middle School in Des Plaines, Illinois. Zawadzki majored in psychology while studying at the University of Colorado Colorado Springs.

Since 2023, she has resided in Stavanger, Norway, where she works as a figure skating coach.

== Career ==
Agnes Zawadzki began skating at the age of 5 in the Chicago area. She also tried dance and gymnastics until deciding to concentrate on skating at the age of 10. While residing in Des Plaines, she was coached by David Santee for seven years, initially receiving group lessons at the Niles Ice Arena and later private lessons at the Oakton Ice Arena in Park Ridge.

Her least favorite jump is the triple loop.

After placing fourth at the novice level at the 2008 U.S. Nationals, she decided to contact coach Tom Zakrajsek. She moved to Colorado Springs, Colorado to train with him at the Olympic Training Center.

=== 2009–10 season: Silver at World Junior Championships ===
During the 2009–10 season, Zawadzki won the U.S. Junior national title. At the 2010 World Junior Championships, she captured the silver medal.

=== 2010–11 season: Senior Grand Prix debut ===
Ahead of the 2010–11 season, Zawadzki decided not to compete on the Junior Grand Prix circuit but to move directly to the senior level. She finished 6th at her debut event, Skate Canada, and 4th at Cup of Russia. She made her senior national debut at the 2011 U.S. Championships. She placed fourth in both the short and free program to claim the pewter medal. She won the bronze medal at the 2011 World Junior Championships.

=== 2011–12 season: Bronze at U.S. Championships ===
On June 3, 2011, Zawadzki announced a coaching change to David Santee and Christy Krall. She continued to train mainly in Colorado Springs, with Krall assisting with day-to-day coaching and spent about a week each month in Park Ridge with Santee who also traveled regularly to Colorado Springs.

In the 2011–12 season, Zawadzki's Grand Prix events were 2011 NHK Trophy and 2011 Cup of Russia. She won the short program at the 2012 U.S. Championships and placed seventh in the free program. Zawadzki finished third overall and won the bronze medal. She was assigned to the 2012 Four Continents and finished 6th. She was also named the first alternate for the 2012 Worlds.

=== 2012–13 season ===
Zawadzki sprained her sacroiliac joint during summer 2012. She won the gold medal at the 2012 U.S. International Classic. She won her first Grand Prix medal, bronze, at the 2012 Rostelecom Cup. Zawadzki won another bronze medal at the 2013 U.S. Championships. She then competed at the 2013 Four Continents and finished 8th.

=== 2013–14 season ===
Zawadzki placed fourth at the 2013 U.S. International Classic. On October 9, 2013, she switched back to Zakrajsek, with her training base remaining the World Arena Ice Hall in Colorado Springs. She received two GP assignments for the 2013–14 season. She placed 7th at the 2013 Cup of China and 6th in her next event, the 2013 Rostelecom Cup.

In June 2014, Zawadzki said she would not compete in the 2014–15 season. She has since retired from competitive figure skating.

== Post-competitive career ==
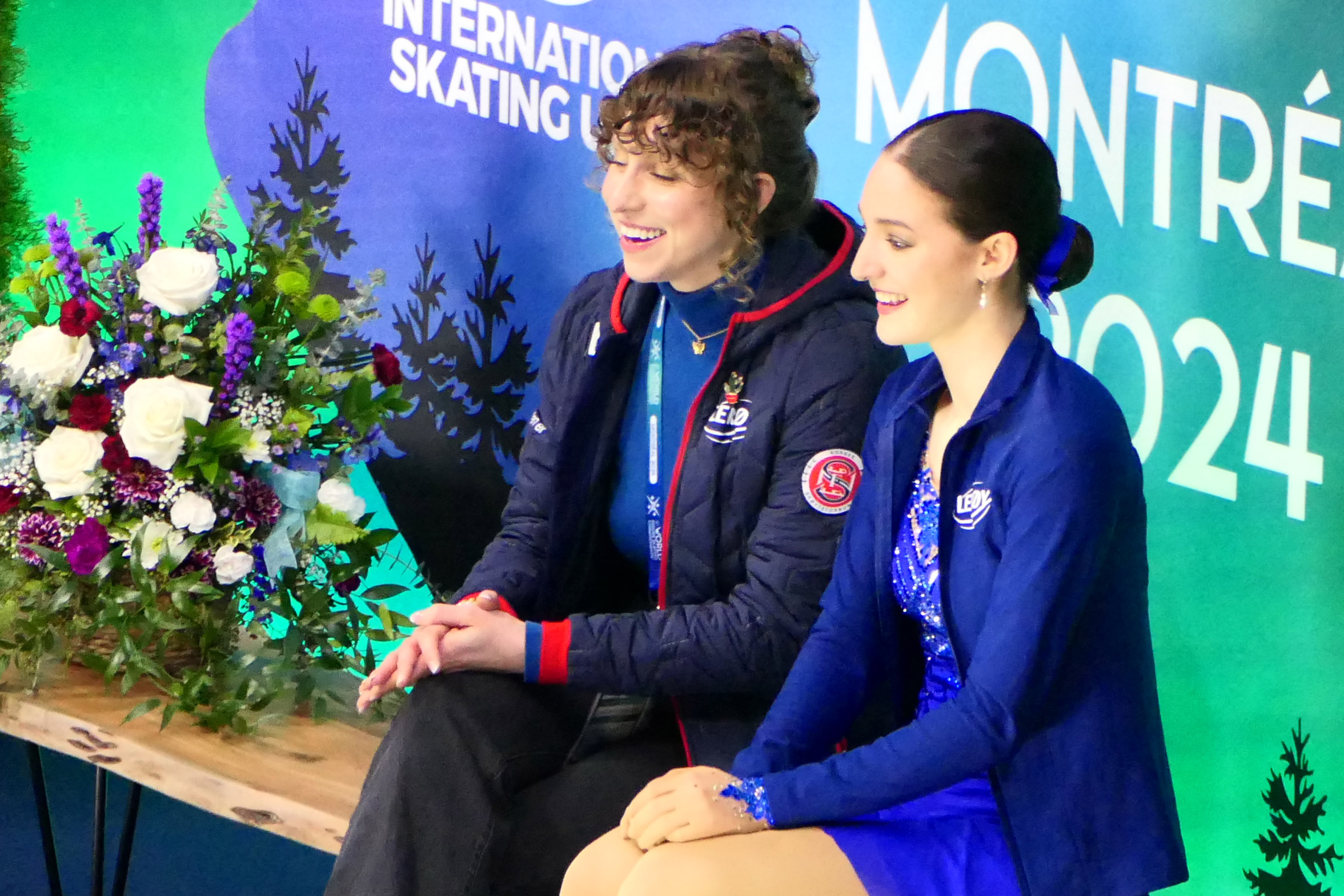
Zawadzki (left) with student, Mia Risa Gomez, in the kiss and cry area at the 2024 World Championships

Following her retirement from competitive figure skating, Zawadzki became a figure skating coach. She coached skaters in Luxembourg from 2020 to 2023 before relocating to Stavanger, Norway. Her students include two-time Norwegian national champion, Mia Risa Gomez.

== Programs ==
Season	Short program	Free skating	Exhibition
2013–14	Sex and the City 2 by Aaron Zigman choreo. by David Wilson	Forever Tango Volume 2: La Cumparsita by Rodriguez, Celos; Jalousie by Gade choreo. by David Wilson	Love On Top; Countdown by Beyoncé
2012–13	Sex and the City 2 by Aaron Zigman choreo. by David Wilson	Rhapsody in Blue by George Gershwin performed by the Boston Pops Orchestra choreo. by Scott Brown	I Will Always Love You performed by Whitney Houston
2011–12	Harlem Nocturne arranged by David Rose; Whatever Lola Wants by Stan Kenton; Harlem Nocturne arranged by Duke Ellington	Rhapsody in Blue by George Gershwin performed by the Boston Pops Orchestra choreo. by Scott Brown	Sway by Luis Demetrio
2010–11	Gopher Mambo by Conrad Gozzo performed by Yma Sumac; Concierto para Bongo by Pérez Prado performed by The Mambo All Stars Orchestra	Zigeunerweisen by Pablo de Sarasate; Hungarian Rhapsodies by David Popper performed by Angele Dubeau and La Pieta	Are You Gonna Be My Girl by Jet
2009–10	Verano Porteño: Four Seasons of Buenos Aires by Astor Piazzolla	Chicago soundtrack by John Kander	At Last by Etta James
2007–08	Right Now by Mocean Worker	A Day in the Life by John Lennon and Paul McCartney	

== Competitive highlights ==
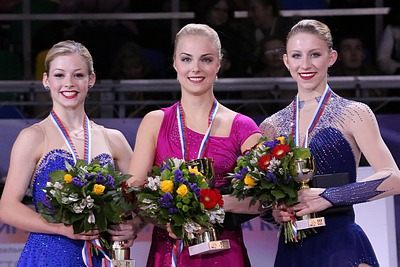
Zawadzki at the 2012 Rostelecom Cup podium.

GP: Grand Prix; JGP: Junior Grand Prix

=== 2009–present ===
International
Event	09–10	10–11	11–12	12–13	13–14
Four Continents			6th	8th	
GP Cup of China					7th
GP NHK Trophy			8th	5th	
GP Rostelecom		4th	7th	3rd	6th
GP Skate Canada		6th			
U.S. Classic				1st	4th
International: Junior
Junior Worlds	2nd	3rd			
National
U.S. Champ.	1st J.	4th	3rd	3rd	11th
Midwestern Sect.	1st J.				
Southwestern Reg.	1st J.	1st			
Team events
Japan Open				2nd T 6th P	
J. = Junior level T: Team result; P: Personal result. Medals awarded for team result only.

=== 2004–2009 ===
International
Event	04–05	05–06	06–07	07–08	08–09
U.S. Championships				4th N.	
U.S. Junior Champ.			2nd I.		
Midwestern Sectionals				4th N.	5th J.
Southwestern Regionals					2nd J.
Upper Great Lakes Reg.	5th Jv.	10th I.	1st I.	1st N.	
Levels: Jv. = Juvenile; I. = Intermediate; N. = Novice; J. = Junior
