= Angela Lien =

American figure skater

Personal information
- Born: January 16, 1981 (age 45) Duluth, Minnesota
- Height: 5 ft 6 in (1.68 m)

Figure skating career
- Coach: Zoe Hill, Heather Seyfer
- Skating club: Duluth FSC
- Retired: 2008

Angela "Angie" Lien (born January 16, 1981) is an American former competitive figure skater, and the 2003 Winter Universiade silver medalist. She was the oldest competitor in the ladies' division at both the 2007 U.S. Figure Skating Championships and the 2008 U.S. Figure Skating Championships.

In 2013, Lien joined the Disney on Ice tour.

In 2025, Angie is a coach for the Duluth Figure Skating Club.

== Results ==
International
Event	93–94	95–96	97–98	98–99	99–00	00–01	01–02	02–03	03–04	04–05	05–06	06–07	07–08
Winter Universiade								2nd					
National
U.S. Champ.		7th N.		14th						15th		20th	17th
Midwestern Sect.	5th I.	3rd N.		4th	WD	6th		3rd	8th	4th	6th	3rd	
Upper Great Lakes	3rd I.	1st N.	9th J.	2nd	1st	1st	5th	2nd	4th	1st	3rd	1st	
U.S. Collegiate							6th	3rd					
Levels: I. = Intermediate; N. = Novice; J. = Junior; WD: Withdrew

== Programs ==
Season	Short program	Free skating
2006–07	Toccata and Fugue by Johann Sebastian Bach	The Legend of 1900 by Ennio Morricone
