= Alexander Johnson (figure skater) =

American figure skater

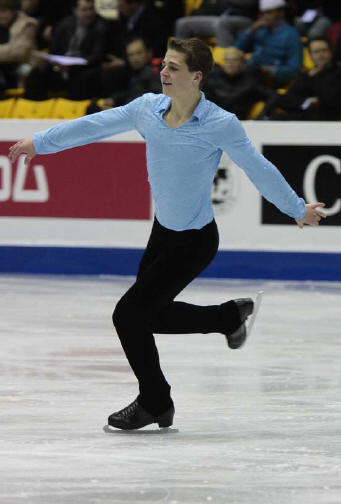
- Johnson in 2008

Personal information
- Full name: Alexander M. Johnson
- Born: May 15, 1990 (age 36) Minneapolis, Minnesota, U.S.
- Home town: Minnetonka, Minnesota, U.S.
- Height: 5 ft 10 in (1.77 m)

Figure skating career
- Country: United States
- Discipline: Men's singles
- Coach: Page Lipe, Caryn Kadavy, Tom Dickson
- Skating club: Braemar City of Lakes FSC, Edina
- Began skating: 1999
- Retired: 2019

Alexander M. Johnson (born May 15, 1990) is a former competitive American figure skater. He is the 2017 CS Nebelhorn Trophy silver medalist, 2013 International Challenge Cup silver medalist, and 2008 JGP Czech Republic champion.

== Personal life ==
Alexander Johnson was born on May 15, 1990, in Minneapolis, Minnesota. His elder sister, Shannon, is a skating coach.

Johnson graduated from Hopkins High School in 2008. After briefly studying science and engineering at the University of Minnesota, he took a leave of absence. He later studied at Normandale Community College before enrolling at the University of Minnesota's Carlson School of Management. In August 2018, he completed an investment banking internship at Lazard.

== Career ==
=== Early years ===
Johnson began learning to skate in 1999. His first coach was Joan Orvis. Beginning in the 2001–2002 season, he competed in juvenile men's singles for two seasons, in the intermediate ranks for two seasons, and then as a novice for two seasons; he won the novice men's silver medal at the 2007 U.S. Championships.

Johnson debuted on the ISU Junior Grand Prix (JGP) series in autumn 2007. The following season, he won two JGP medals — gold in the Czech Republic and bronze in England — and qualified for the ISU Junior Grand Prix Final, where he finished sixth. He received the junior bronze medal at the 2009 U.S. Championships.

Johnson also trained in pair skating. He competed with Chelsey Jernberg in the juvenile category at the 2004 and 2005 U.S. Junior Championships. With Danielle Viola, he placed 6th in the novice ranks at the 2012 U.S. Championships.

=== Senior career ===
Johnson began competing in the senior men's category in the 2009–2010 season. He made his senior international debut at the 2009 Finlandia Trophy.

At the 2013 U.S. Championships, Johnson finished seventh after placing 12th in the short program and fifth in the free skate. He landed a 3Lz-1Lo-3F in the free skate. He then won silver at the 2013 International Challenge Cup in The Hague, Netherlands. He was coached mainly by Tom Dickson and Catarina Lindgren, and also worked once a week with Christy Krall.

In June 2013, Johnson tore ligaments in his right ankle while practicing a triple Axel jump and sustained nerve damage from the knee down during surgery in July. He returned to the ice after ten weeks and resumed full training in April 2014 with a titanium screw in his ankle.

Johnson finished 11th at the 2015 U.S. Championships. In the summer of 2015, he underwent surgery for multiple hernias. At the 2016 U.S. Championships, he ranked seventh in the short program, fifth in the free skate, and sixth overall – his best result to date. He replicated that result at the 2017 U.S. Championships, after placing ninth in the short and fifth in the free.

In 2018, Johnson was invited to his first Grand Prix event, the 2018 NHK Trophy.

In 2019, Johnson decided to start a career in finance and work as a part time skating coach, effectively ending participation in competitive skating.

== Programs ==
Season	Short program	Free skating	Exhibition
2018–2019	Don't Stop the Music by Jamie Cullum choreo. by Shae-Lynn Bourne; Song of the Stars by Dead Can Dance choreo. by Alexander Johnson	The Golden Age; Iron; Run Boy Run by Woodkid choreo. by Shae-Lynn Bourne	
2017–2018	Legends by Sacred Spirit choreo. by Tom Dickson	Mea Culpa; Sadeness by Enigma choreo. by Rohene Ward; In Your Eyes by Peter Gabriel	
2016–2017	Intro by B-Tribe; Bamboleo by Gipsy Kings choreo. by Tom Dickson	La Strada by Nino Rota choreo. by Tom Dickson	
2015–2016	Trance by Yair Dalal performed by Dalal & Al Ol Ensemble Album: Silan (1998) choreo. by Catarina Lindgren, Christopher Dean	Eleanor Rigby by The Beatles choreo. by Tom Dickson; The Christ Trilogy by Balázs Havasi; Parce mihi domine performed by Jan Garbarek and The Hilliard Ensemble Album: Officium (1994); In the Act of Creation by Balázs Havasi choreo. by Tom Dickson	
2014–2015	Trio élégiaque No. 2 by Sergei Rachmaninoff choreo. by Catarina Lindgren	Sweeney Todd by Stephen Sondheim; The Barber and His Wife; Johanna choreo. by Tom Dickson	
2013–2014	Stairway to Heaven by Rodrigo y Gabriela	A Nightmare on Elm Street by DiscoPhantom; Drowning by Abel Korzeniowski; Dinner Waltz by Alexandre Desplat; Bernini's Angels by Kerry Muzzey	
2012–2013	Concerto in F by George Gershwin	Eleanor Rigby by The Beatles	
2011–2012	O Mio Babbino Caro by Giacomo Puccini performed by Joshua Bell	Gayane by Aram Khachaturian	Hey, Soul Sister
2010–2011	Caravan performed by Duke Ellington, Dave Grusin and Tommy Newsom	Le Grand Tango; Oblivion; Allegro Tangabile by Astor Piazzolla	Hey, Soul Sister
2009–2010	Take Five by Dave Brubeck	Piano Concerto No. 2 in C minor, Op. 18 – III Alegro Scherzando by Sergei Rachmaninoff	
2008–2009	Fantasy for Violin and Orchestra (from Ladies in Lavender) by Joshua Bell choreo. by Sebastien Britten	Introduction and Rondo Capriccioso, Op 28 by Camille Saint-Saëns; Meditation (from Thais) by Jules Massenet choreo. by Sebastien Britten	What I Like About You by The Romantics choreo. by Kathleen Gazich
2007–2008	Cello Concerto No. 1 in A minor by Camille Saint-Saëns	Introduction and Rondo Capriccioso, Op 28 by Camille Saint-Saëns; Meditation (from Thais) by Jules Massenet choreo. by Sebastien Britten	
2006–2007	Cello Concerto No. 1 in A minor by Camille Saint-Saëns	Autumn (from The Four Seasons) by Antonio Vivaldi	
2005–2006	The Royal Tenenbaums	Autumn (from The Four Seasons) by Antonio Vivaldi	

== Competitive highlights ==
GP: Grand Prix; CS: Challenger Series; JGP: Junior Grand Prix

=== Men's singles: Senior career ===
International
Event	09–10	10–11	11–12	12–13	14–15	15–16	16–17	17–18	18–19
GP NHK Trophy									7th
CS Autumn Classic					8th				
CS Golden Spin						6th		9th	
CS Finlandia									15th
CS Nebelhorn					6th			2nd	
CS Ondrej Nepela							6th		
Autumn Classic						4th			
Challenge Cup				2nd					
Finlandia Trophy	10th								
Philadelphia								5th	
National
U.S. Champ.	17th	16th	15th	7th	11th	6th	6th	8th	9th

=== Men's singles: Juvenile through junior career ===
International
Event	06–07	07–08	08–09
JGP Final			6th
JGP Bulgaria		4th	
JGP Czech Republic			1st
JGP United Kingdom			3rd
Gardena Trophy	3rd J		
National
U.S. Champ.	2nd N	7th J	3rd J

== Detailed results ==
Small medals for short and free programs awarded only at ISU Championships.

2018–2019 season
Date	Event	SP	FS	Total
Jan. 19 – 27, 2019	2019 U.S. Championships	11; 74.07	8; 142.41	9; 216.48
9–11 November 2018	2018 NHK Trophy	8; 72.03	7; 127.72	7; 199.75
4–7 October 2018	2018 CS Finlandia Trophy	15; 59.42	15; 118.61	15; 178.03
2017–2018 season
Date	Event	SP	FS	Total
Dec. 29 – Jan. 8, 2018	2018 U.S. Championships	10; 79.60	8; 153.02	8; 232.62
December 6–9, 2017	2017 CS Golden Spin of Zagreb	3; 78.80	9; 140.08	9; 218.88
September 27–30, 2017	2017 CS Nebelhorn Trophy	2; 82.55	6; 143.49	2; 226.04
August 3–5, 2017	2017 Philadelphia Summer International	4; 73.14	6; 130.25	5; 203.39
2016–2017 season
Date	Event	SP	FS	Total
January 14–22, 2017	2017 U.S. Championships	9; 75.19	5; 158.20	6; 233.39
Sept. 30 – Oct. 2, 2016	2016 CS Ondrej Nepela Memorial	4; 71.41	6; 137.23	6; 208.64
2015–2016 season
Date	Event	SP	FS	Total
January 16–24, 2016	2016 U.S. Championships	7; 73.69	5; 168.25	6; 241.94
December 2–5, 2015	2015 CS Golden Spin of Zagreb	4; 71.95	6; 140.90	6; 212.85
October 13–15, 2015	2015 Autumn Classic International	5; 63.27	4; 133.05	4; 196.32
2014–2015 season
Date	Event	SP	FS	Total
January 18–25, 2015	2015 U.S. Championships	12; 68.46	10; 149.81	11; 218.27
October 15–16, 2014	2014 Autumn Classic	4; 66.99	8; 126.07	8; 193.06
September 24–27, 2014	2014 CS Nebelhorn Trophy	6; 69.20	6; 122.21	6; 191.41
2012–2013 season
Date	Event	SP	FS	Total
February 21–24, 2013	2013 Challenge Cup	2; 76.53	1; 152.01	2; 228.54
January 19–27, 2013	2013 U.S. Championships	12; 65.20	5; 159.29	7; 224.49
2011–2012 season
Date	Event	SP	FS	Total
January 22–29, 2012	2012 U.S. Championships	15; 57.73	8; 141.50	15; 199.23
2010–2011 season
Date	Event	SP	FS	Total
January 23–30, 2011	2011 U.S. Championships	16; 57.30	17; 108.20	16; 165.50
2009–2010 season
Date	Event	SP	FS	Total
January 15–17, 2010	2010 U.S. Championships	22; 54.29	14; 114.00	17; 168.29
October 8–11, 2009	2009 Finlandia Trophy	11; 54.94	11; 110.09	10; 165.03

=== Junior level ===
2008–2009 season
Date	Event	SP	FS	Total
January 18–25, 2009	2009 U.S. Championships	7; 51.68	1; 119.40	3; 171.08
December 10–14, 2008	2008–09 Junior Grand Prix Final	4; 64.85	6; 113.55	6; 178.40
October 15–18, 2008	2008 Junior Grand Prix, United Kingdom	2; 68.07	3; 119.74	3; 187.81
17 – 21 Sept, 2008	2008 Junior Grand Prix, Czech Republic	1; 66.53	2; 121.05	1; 187.58
2007–2008 season
Date	Event	SP	FS	Total
January 20–27, 2008	2008 U.S. Championships	5; 59.12	9; 110.07	7; 169.19
October 3–6, 2007	2007 Junior Grand Prix, Bulgaria	6; 52.65	4; 111.97	4; 164.92
2006–2007 season
Date	Event	SP	FS	Total
March 29–30, 2007	2007 Gardena Spring Trophy	5; 46.27	3; 105.53	3; 151.80
