= Kath Malmberg =

American figure skater

Figure skating career
- Country: United States
- Retired: 1976

Kath Malmberg is an American former competitive figure skater. She is the 1973 Nebelhorn Trophy champion, the 1974 Prague Skate champion, the 1975 Skate Canada International silver medalist, and a two-time (1974-1975) U.S. national bronze medalist.

Malmberg married American figure skater Gordon McKellen in 1977 and gave birth to their two children in the 1980s.

== Results ==
International
Event	70–71	71–72	72–73	73–74	74–75	75–76
World Champ.				7th	5th	
Skate Canada						2nd
Nebelhorn Trophy				1st		
Prague Skate					1st	
Richmond Trophy					3rd	
National
U.S. Champ.	7th J	10th	6th	3rd	3rd	4th
