= John Baldwin Sr. =

American figure skater

John Baldwin Sr. was an American figure skater who competed in men's singles. He finished fourth at the United States Figure Skating Championships in 1972, narrowly missing a chance to compete in the Olympics that year.

Baldwin is the father of skaters John Baldwin Jr., Don Baldwin, and Donna Baldwin.

== Results ==
Event	1968	1969	1970	1971	1972	1973	1974
U.S. Championships	3rd J	1st J	5th		4th	5th	7th
