= Daniel Hollander =

American figure skater

Personal information
- Born: May 9, 1972 (age 54) Royal Oak, Michigan, U.S.
- Height: 5 ft 2 in (1.57 m)

Figure skating career
- Country: United States
- Discipline: Men's singles
- Skating club: Detroit Skating Club; St. Clair Shores FSC
- Began skating: 1976
- Retired: 1999

Daniel "Dan" Hollander (born May 9, 1972) is an American figure skater. He is a two-time Vienna Cup champion (1995, 1997) and a two-time U.S. national bronze medalist (1996, 1997). He finished tenth at the 1996 World Championships in Edmonton, Alberta, Canada.

In the 1996–97 season, Hollander trained under Diana Ronayne in St. Clair Shores, Michigan. In 1999, he sustained a number of injuries that forced him to turn professional. He became known for his comedic skating programs. Hollander announced his retirement from competition by executing a backflip, which was an illegal element in figure skating at that time. The ban has since been lifted.

Hollander coaches figure skating in Maryland. On October 17, 2015, he married a skating coach, Emily Chase, in Bloomfield Hills, Michigan. Their daughter, Arianna Alina, was born on May 13, 2016.

== Programs ==
| Season | Short program | Free skating |
|---|---|---|
| 1996–97 | | The Barber of Seville: Overture by Gioacchino Rossini, New York Philharmarmonic Orchestra; Carmen Jones by Georges Bizet, London Festival Orchestra; Largo al Factotum by Gioacchino Rossini, Columbia Symphony Orchestra |
| 1992–93 | | Robin Hood Prince of Thieves soundtrack (Overture And A Prisoner Of The Crusades); The Princess Bride soundtrack (I Will Never Love Again); Robin Hood Prince of Thieves (The Abduction and The Final Battle At The Gallows) |

== Competitive highlights ==
GP: Champions Series / Grand Prix

International
| Event | 89–90 | 90–91 | 91–92 | 92–93 | 93–94 | 94–95 | 95–96 | 96–97 | 97–98 | 98–99 |
|---|---|---|---|---|---|---|---|---|---|---|
| World Champ. | | | | | | | 10th | 35th | | |
| GP Cup of Russia | | | | | | | | 7th | | |
| GP Nations Cup | | | | | | | | 4th | | |
| GP NHK Trophy | | | | | | | | | 4th | |
| GP Skate America | | | | | | | | 9th | | |
| GP Skate Canada | | | | | | | | | 7th | 11th |
| Centennial on Ice | | | | | | | 8th | | | |
| Vienna Cup | | | | | | | 1st | | 1st | |
| Nebelhorn Trophy | | | | 4th | | | | | | |
| Skate Canada (int.) | | | | | | 5th | | | | |
| St. Gervais | | | | 3rd | | | | | | |
National
| U.S. Champ. | 8th J | 6th J | 2nd J | 10th | 10th | 7th | 3rd | 3rd | 6th | 11th |
| U.S. Champ. (fig.) | | 9th | | | | | | | | |
J: Junior level
