= James Disbrow =

US figure skater and businessman

James "Jimmy" Disbrow (July 9, 1948 – October 16, 2002) was a figure skater and restaurateur who later served as president of the United States Figure Skating Association from 1998 to 2000.

Disbrow contracted polio as a child and started skating to strengthen his legs. He won the silver medal in the junior men's division at the U.S. Figure Skating Championships in 1966 and also competed in pairs at the national level with partner Katie Walker. He was coached by David and Rita Lowery; they became his adopted family. Scott Hamilton, who also trained with the Lowerys at the time, later cited Disbrow as one of his childhood role models.

Following his competitive skating career, Disbrow spent two years touring with Holiday on Ice. Later, he became a skating judge. He was chairman of the USFSA's International Committee during the Tonya Harding scandal at the time of the 1994 Winter Olympics and served as the US figure skating team leader at the 1998 Winter Olympics and chairman of the organizing committee for the 1998 World Figure Skating Championships in Minneapolis, Minnesota before his election to the USFSA presidency.

Jim Disbrow co-founded the Buffalo Wild Wings & Weck (later renamed Buffalo Wild Wings) restaurant chain with Scott Lowery in 1982 and served as its president and CEO until 1997.

Disbrow died of brain cancer at age 54. He had been diagnosed with the disease shortly after his election to the USFSA presidency in 1998.
