= Scott Kurttila =

American figure skater

Personal information
- Born: c. 1965 (age 60–61)

Figure skating career
- Country: United States
- Discipline: Men's singles
- Coach: Kathy Casey
- Retired: 1988

Scott Kurttila (born c. 1965) is an American former competitive figure skater. Competing in men's singles, he won gold at the 1987 Golden Spin of Zagreb.

Kurttila began skating when he was eleven years old. He won the pewter medal in the junior men's event at the 1985 U.S. Championships and placed sixth at the 1987 Winter Universiade in Czechoslovakia. He was coached by Kathy Casey.

Kurttila ended his competitive career in 1988. In 1992, he tried pair skating with Calla Urbanski but the two decided not to compete together. He studied at Georgetown University and worked at Amazon.com.

== Competitive highlights ==
International
Event	83–84	84–85	85–86	86–87	87–88
Golden Spin of Zagreb					1st
Skate Canada				7th	
Winter Universiade				6th	
National
U.S. Championships	7th J	4th J	9th	7th	11th
Olympic Festival				8th	
