= Aren Nielsen =

American figure skater

Personal information
- Born: July 5, 1968 (age 58)

Figure skating career
- Country: United States

Aren Nielsen (born July 5, 1968) is an American former competitive figure skater. He is the 1988 Nebelhorn Trophy champion, the 1990 Golden Spin of Zagreb champion, and a two-time U.S. national bronze medalist. He placed 13th at the 1994 World Championships in Chiba, Japan. He is currently the skating director at the Atlanta IceForum in Duluth, Georgia.

== Competitive highlights ==
GP: Champions Series (Grand Prix)

International
Event	86–87	87–88	88–89	90–91	91–92	92–93	93–94	94–95	95–96	96–97
World Champ.							13th			
GP Skate America									8th	
Golden Spin				1st						
Goodwill Games								7th		
Nebelhorn Trophy			1st							
NHK Trophy						5th				
Skate America							6th			
St. Gervais			3rd							
National
U.S. Champ.	11th J	2nd J	10th	12th	5th	4th	3rd	3rd	8th	9th
U.S. Olympic Fest.					2nd					
J = Junior

=== Other competitive highlights ===
Year	Competition	Placement
1993	AT&T Pro-Am Challenge	5
1994	Hershey's Kisses Pro-Am Challenge	3
1995	Pro-Am Team Challenge; Team "Eagles"	1
1997	U.S. Open Professional Skating Championship, Challenge Cup	4
