= Tonia Kwiatkowski =

American figure skating coach

Tonia Sue Kwiatkowski (born February 12, 1971) is an American figure skating coach and former competitor. She is a two-time Winter Universiade champion, a two-time Champions Series silver medalist, and the 1996 U.S. National silver medalist in women's singles. She finished in the top ten at two World Championships and competed in 13 U.S. Championships. Carol Heiss Jenkins and Glyn Watts were her longtime coaches. Kwiatkowski retired from amateur skating in 1998 and continues to be involved in the sport as a coach and commentator.

In domestic competition, she represented the Winterhurst Figure Skating Club based in the suburbs of Cleveland, Ohio.

== Personal life ==
Kwiatkowski was born on February 12, 1971, in Cleveland, Ohio. She graduated from Lakewood High School in Ohio. In June 1994, she earned a degree in communications and psychology from Cleveland's Baldwin-Wallace College. According to a March 18, 1996, Los Angeles Times article, Kwiatkowski's college degree was notable as "...most of her competitors have not finished high school."

Kwiatkowski later married and had a child. She divorced after a 2011 FBI investigation exposed her affair with convicted felon William Neiheiser.

== Skating style and repertoire ==
Kwiatkowski was well known among skaters for her unusual jump entrance technique into the triple lutz. Skating backward, she would cross her left foot over the top of her right foot, pause with both feet on the ice placed closely together, then unhook the right foot (underneath and behind the left) to pick into the ice.

In addition to the triple lutz, Kwiatkowski frequently performed the triple toe loop, triple flip, and triple loop. She had a higher success rate on toe-assisted jumps, as she frequently struggled on the edge-entrance triple loop, and only added the triple salchow back into her performance repertoire near the end of her amateur skating career. Her spins were fast with clean positions, and her basic skating quality was marked by great speed.

As she matured and as fashions in the sport changed, so did Kwiatkowski's image. By the mid-1990s, she often selected a tight, low bun as an on-ice hairstyle, coupled with elegant dresses with highly detailed beading and design details. During her prime competitive years in the mid-1990s, her adult physique and mode of dress distinguished her from most of her "baby ballerina" (a term frequently used by Dick Button in commentary for the U.S. Nationals as televised on ABC) rivals, who were typically 5 to 10 years her junior and usually did not attempt the mature look that Kwiatkowski achieved. This did not go unnoticed by the press, as evidenced by an AP article dated April 5, 1998, noting of Kwiatkowski's World Championship performances that "...her spins were lovely, and her age gives her a grace few other skaters can match."

== 1993 season ==
After several strong finishes at the U.S. Nationals, Kwiatkowski made the World Championship team in 1993, an unusual year in figure skating: it was a post-Olympic year and pre-Olympic year, as the Winter Games were being switched to a different cycle so that they occurred two years after the Summer Games. As such, several 1992 Olympic hopefuls had moved on.

Typically a "rebuilding" year for the sport, this post-Olympic year was different, as the U.S.'s number of Olympic berths would be determined by skaters' performances at the 1993 World Championships. At these critical national championships, Kwiatkowski stood fourth after the short program. When Tonya Harding, reaching the nadir of a two-year skating slump, fell several times in her long program (after having placed second in the short program, during which her dress had come undone), and third-place Nicole Bobek also made several mistakes, fourth-place Kwiatkowski had a chance to move up onto the podium and onto the World team. With a sub-par performance, she managed to move up to third, as Carol Heiss' other pupil Lisa Ervin rose from fifth to second.

Regardless, her third-place finish meant that she was on the World team and heading to the World Championships. However, she skated extremely poorly in the initial round, failing to even qualify for the main draw, leaving the U.S. with just two skaters in the ladies' event. After Ervin finished in 14th place, heavy favorite Nancy Kerrigan skated poorly and fell from first after the short program to fifth overall, leaving the U.S. with just two berths for 1994. While Kerrigan was the logical scapegoat for this outcome, some U.S. officials were rumored to harbor resentment against Kwiatkowski as well.

Kwiatkowski did not skate well at the 1994 Nationals and finished fifth, failing to qualify for an Olympic spot. According to an 11 February 1995 article in the Chicago Tribune, "After she placed fifth overall in the 1994 nationals last January, her coach, Carol Heiss, was being told by skating insiders that Kwiatkowski had no future in the sport."

== 1995 to 1998 ==
After graduating from college the previous year, Kwiatkowski gave a strong performance at the 1995 U.S. Nationals, taking the lead after the short program and finishing third behind Nicole Bobek and Michelle Kwan, with a fall on a triple flip in the long program costing her a shot at the title (see 1995 Nationals review article written the following year, "Kwiatkowksi is no kid at U.S. Championships" AP News, January 17, 1996). But because of the Americans' performance at the 1994 Worlds, only two slots were available for American ladies figure skaters, leaving Kwiatkowski off the World team in 1995.

Placing second in the 1996 Nationals behind Kwan assured Kwiatkowski a spot on that year's team, and she placed 8th at the Worlds in a performance that included a full arsenal of triple jumps. Overshadowed by Kwan's gold medal performance, Kwiatkowski's finish was something of a redemption, as she delivered the elements under pressure.

In 1998, at age 26, Kwiatkowski was the "old lady" of figure skating, nine years older than rival Michelle Kwan and eleven years senior Tara Lipinski. A heavy favorite to vie for the third Olympic spot behind the two youngsters, she had hoped to close out her career with a trip to the Olympics, but finished 4th at the U.S. National Championships behind Nicole Bobek and did not make the Olympic team. However, she had a chance to end her career on a positive note. Due to an illness, Tara Lipinski withdrew from the 1998 World Championships following the Olympics, and Kwiatkowski skated in her place. At age 27, she had "the skate of her life" and placed 6th, her best finish in a major international competition.

== Results ==
GP: Champions Series (Grand Prix)

International
Event	87–88	88–89	89–90	90–91	91–92	92–93	93–94	94–95	95–96	96–97	97–98
Worlds						31st			8th		6th
GP Final										6th	
GP NHK Trophy										2nd	
GP Skate America									5th	2nd	
GP France								2nd	5th		
Nations Cup							7th				
Nebelhorn Trophy		1st									
NHK Trophy			3rd		8th						
Piruetten											1st
Karl Schäfer											2nd
Skate America				3rd							
Skate Electric			1st								
Universiade				1st				1st			
National
U.S. Champ.	11th	7th	6th	4th	5th	3rd	5th	3rd	2nd	6th	4th
