= David Santee =

American figure skater

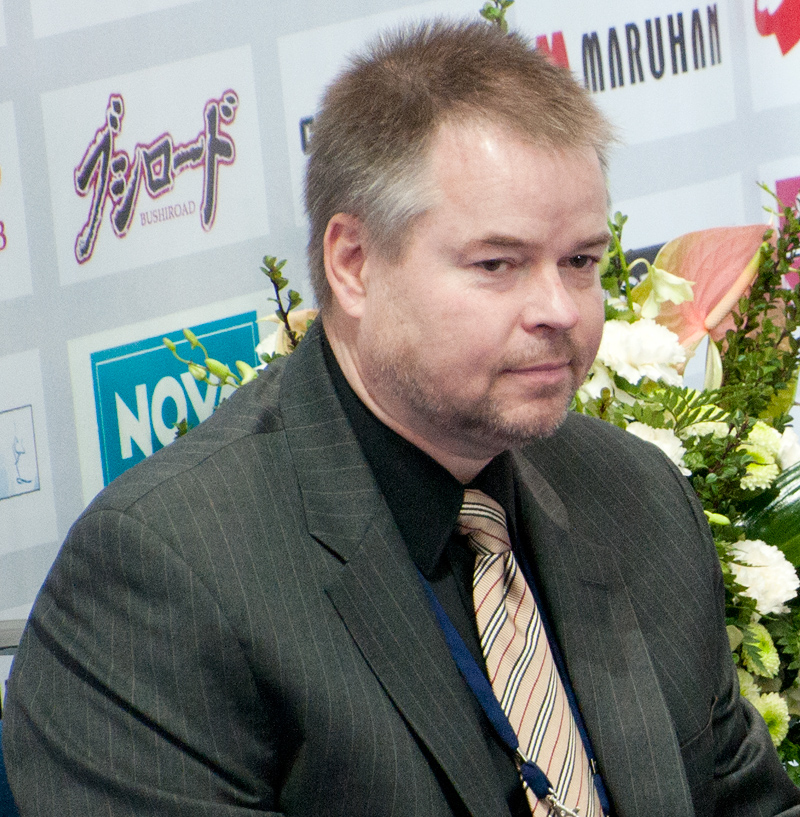
- Santee in 2011

Personal information
- Full name: David Neil Santee
- Born: July 22, 1957 (age 69) Oak Park, Illinois, U.S.

Figure skating career
- Country: United States
- Skating club: Chicago FSC
- Retired: 1982
Medal record
Figure skating: Men's singles
Representing United States
World Championships
Silver medal – second place	1981 Hartford	Men's singles

David Neil Santee (born July 22, 1957 in Oak Park, Illinois) is an American former competitive figure skater. He finished fourth in the 1980 Winter Olympics in Lake Placid, and is the 1981 World silver medalist and an eight-time U.S. national medalist. He competed at the Winter Olympics twice.

His younger brother James Santee was also an elite-level skater.

David was inducted to both the U.S. Figure Skating and ISI Hall of Fame in 2015. He achieved the PSA Master Coach's rating in 2017.

Santee is an ISU Technical Specialist. He also works as a coach. He coached Agnes Zawadzki for seven years as a child and again since June 2011. He is currently the Director of Skating at the Oakton Ice Arena in his hometown of Park Ridge, Illinois. He has served on the ISI Board of Directors as the Instructors Rep for many years and is ISI's representative to the US Figure Skating Board of Directors.

He has two sons.

== Results ==
International
Event	70–71	71–72	72–73	73–74	74–75	75–76	76–77	77–78	78–79	79–80	80–81	81–82
Winter Olympics						6th				4th		
World Championships						5th	4th	6th	8th	4th	2nd	8th
Skate Canada								3rd				3rd
NHK Trophy										3rd		
Nebelhorn Trophy					1st							
Prague Skate				2nd								
St. Gervais					1st							
U.S. Championships	1st J	8th	3rd	5th	5th	2nd	3rd	2nd	3rd	2nd	2nd	3rd
