= Tom Dickson (figure skater) =

American figure skater

Tom Dickson is an American figure skating choreographer, coach, and former competitor. He is the 1980 Nebelhorn Trophy champion, 1982 St. Ivel International bronze medalist, and 1980 U.S. national junior champion.

== Career ==
During his eligible career, Dickson won the U.S. Figure Skating Championships at junior level in 1980; at the senior level, he placed 5th at the 1984 Championships. He won the Nebelhorn Trophy in 1980. After ending his competitive career, Dickson skated with Ice Capades.

=== Choreography ===
Dickson started doing skating choreography when his former coach, Carlo Fassi, asked him to work with Chen Lu in 1991. Dickson also coaches at the Broadmoor Skating Club.

He has choreographed for the following skaters:

- (United States) Jeremy Abbott
- (Canada) Vaughn Chipeur
- (United States) Rachael Flatt
- (Japan) Marin Honda
- (United States) Ryan Jahnke
- (United States) Alex Johnson
- (Japan) Rika Kihira
- (South Korea) Kim Chae-Hwa
- (South Korea) Yuna Kim
- (United States) Ann Patrice McDonough
- (United States) Hannah Miller
- (Japan) Satoko Miyahara
- (United States) Brandon Mroz
- (United States) Mirai Nagasu
- (Japan) Yukina Ota
- (United States) Parker Pennington
- (United States) Adam Rippon
- (Norway) Mia Risa Gomez
- (United States) Matthew Savoie
- (Japan) Aki Sawada
- (Japan) Yuna Shiraiwa
- (Japan) Nana Takeda
- (United States) Michael Villarreal
- (United States) Megan Williams-Stewart
- (United States) Joshua Farris
- (South Korea) You Young
- (United States) Agnes Zawadzki
- (United States) Caroline Zhang
- (Japan) Hana Yoshida
- (United States) Camden Pulkinen
- (South Korea) Lee Hae-in

Dickson also choreographed the "Princess Classics" show for Disney on Ice. He won the USFSA's Paul McGrath Choreographer of the Year award in 2002, 2003, 2004, and 2006.

== Personal life ==
Dickson was born on July 14, 1962. He began playing the oboe when he was ten years old. He married Swedish figure skater Catarina Lindgren in 1986 and their twins, a boy and a girl, were born in the late 1990s.

== Results ==
International
Event	78–79	79-80	80–81	81–82	82–83	83–84
Nebelhorn Trophy			1st			
St. Ivel International					3rd	
National
U.S. Championships	4th J	1st J		8th	7th	5th
J = Junior
