= James Santee =

Former American figure skater

Personal information
- Other names: Jimmie Santee
- Born: c. 1962 (age 63–64) Oak Park, Illinois
- Home town: Park Ridge, Illinois

Figure skating career
- Country: United States
- Coach: Evy and Mary Scotvold (1978-1984), Candy Brown (1978-80), Gail Garrity Reed (1978-80), Kay Faynor (1977), Rueben Huron (1968-76)
- Skating club: Chicago FSC (1978-1984), Broadmoor FSC (1970-77), Arapahoe FSC (1968-69)
- Began skating: mid-1960s
- Retired: Amateur 1984, Walt Disney's World on Ice 1995

James "Jimmie" Santee is an American former competitive figure skater. He is the 1981 Golden Spin of Zagreb champion, 1982 Ennia Challenge Cup silver medalist, and 1983 Prague Skate silver medalist. Since 2006, he has served as the executive director of the Professional Skaters Association.

== Personal life ==
James Santee was born c. 1962, the son of RoseMary and Neil Santee. His mother served as a judge for U.S. Figure Skating and his elder brother, David Santee, competed internationally in figure skating. In 1987, he married Jamie-Lynn Kitching, who won the silver medal at the 1981 World Professional Championships and performed with Disney on Ice as a principal skater from 1983–95. They had their first child, a son named Ryan, around 1995, and then two daughters, Sarah and Jessica. Ryan Santee competed at the junior national level in the United States.

== Career ==
=== Competitive ===
Santee began skating when he was three years old, following his elder brother. They trained at various rinks, including the Oakton Ice Arena in Park Ridge, Illinois, Randhurst, Polar Dome in East Dundee, Rolling Meadows, Northbrook, and Niles Ice Land.

In addition to his career as a figure skater, Santee qualified to the 1975 U.S. Speed Skating Championships and 1975 North American Speed Skating Championships. Competing at the U.S. Figure Skating Championships, Santee won the novice men's title in 1977 and the junior men's title in 1979. He finished 7th at the 1979 World Junior Championships in Augsburg, Germany.

Santee began appearing on the senior level in 1980. Internationally, he won gold at the 1981 Golden Spin of Zagreb in Yugoslavia, silver at the 1982 Ennia Challenge Cup in the Netherlands, and silver at the 1983 Prague Skate in Czechoslovakia. He finished fourth at the 1982 Skate America.

=== Post-competitive ===
After retiring from competition, Santee worked for Walt Disney's World on Ice, appearing as a principal performer (1985–95) and then as a coach (1987–95). He later served as the skating director and facilities coordinator for Park Ridge Recreation & Park District in Park Ridge, Illinois. From 1996 to 2005, he was the head coach for the Park Ridge speed skating team. He was named the 2002 Employee of the Year.

In 2006, Santee became the executive director of the Professional Skaters Association.

== Competitive highlights ==
International
Event	77–78	77–79	79–80	80–81	81–82	82–83	83–84
Ennia Challenge					2nd		
Golden Spin					1st		
Nebelhorn Trophy			4th				
Prague Skate							2nd
Skate America						4th	
St. Gervais			4th				
International: Junior
Junior Worlds		7th					
National
U.S. Champ.	3rd J	1st J	9th	6th	6th		11th

Other

- 1979 Coupe Des Alpes Team Trophy, 1st place
- 1984 Golden Skate Award, Oakton Ice Arena
- 1999 Ice Skating Institute District 8 Merit Award
- 2004 Ice Skating Institute Great Skate Award
- 2008 Ice Skating Institute Presidents Award
