= Eddie Shipstad =

American figure skater

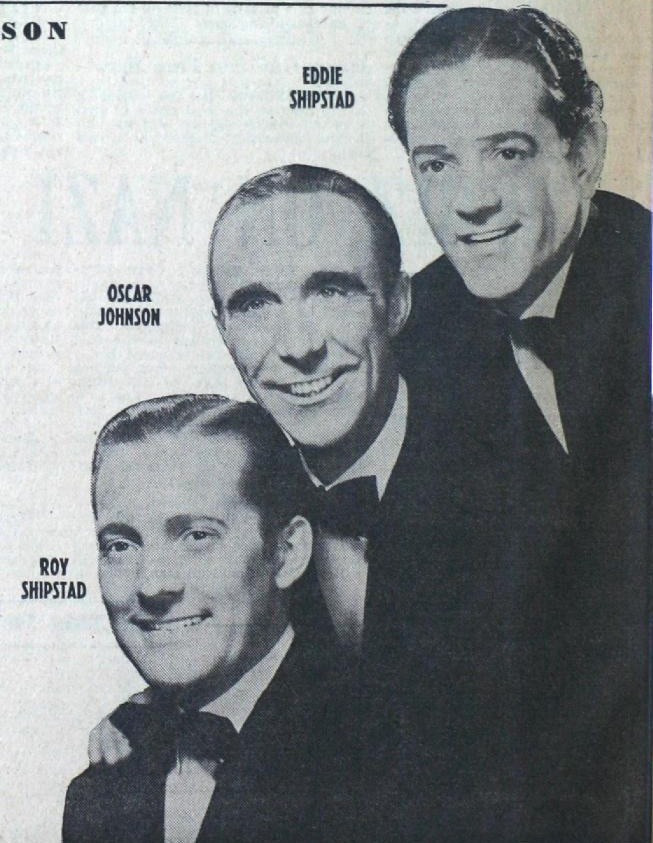
- Shipstad (right) with Roy Shipstad and Oscar Johnson in 1945
- Born: February 16, 1907
- Died: August 20, 1998 (aged 91); Los Angeles, California, U.S.
- Occupation: Figure skater
- Children: 3

Eddie Shipstad (February 16, 1907 – August 20, 1998) was an American figure skater.

== Life and career ==
Shipstad was the son of Swedish immigrants. He worked with his brother Roy Shipstad and his friend Oscar Johnson, performing at hockey games in Saint Paul, Minnesota. He, his brother and his friend gained success in New York and recruited with other figure skaters to perform at Roy Wilkins Auditorium in 1935.

In 1936, Shipstad co-founded the Ice Follies, an ice show business. In 1939, he appeared in the film The Ice Follies of 1939. In 1976, he was inducted into the United States Figure Skating Hall of Fame.

Shipstad died on August 20, 1998 at his home in Los Angeles, California, at the age of 91.
