= Vikki de Vries =

American figure skater

Personal information
- Born: July 25, 1964 (age 61)

Figure skating career
- Country: United States
- Retired: c. 1984

Vikki de Vries (born July 25, 1964) is an American former competitive figure skater who appeared in ladies' singles. She won gold at five internationals – the 1980 Nebelhorn Trophy, 1980 Grand Prix International St. Gervais, 1981 Skate America, 1982 Skate Canada International, and 1982 Ennia Challenge – and silver at the 1982 U.S. Championships. De Vries was also selected to compete at the 1982 World Championships in Copenhagen, Denmark, where she finished seventh. She trained in Colorado Springs, Colorado. De Vries was one of top US women's skaters of the time period, but injuries slowed down her career, and she was left off the 1983 World team and was unable to compete in 1984.

== Results ==
International
Event	79–80	80–81	81–82	82–83	83–84
World Champ.			7th		
Skate America			1st		
Skate Canada				1st	
NHK Trophy			2nd		
Ennia Challenge				1st	
Nebelhorn Trophy		1st			
St. Gervais		1st			
National
U.S. Champ.	1st J		2nd	4th	WD
J: Junior level; WD: Withdrew
