= Donald Adair =

American ice dancer

Personal information
- Born: 1960 (age 65–66)

Figure skating career
- Country: United States
- Retired: 1987

Donald Adair (born 1960) is an American former ice dancer. With Renée Roca, he is the 1986 U.S. national champion. An injury led to Adair's sudden retirement from competitive skating prior to the 1987 World Championships. He married Kelley Morris, the 1977 U.S. junior champion in ice dancing. They have coached at the Indiana Skating Academy in Indianapolis and the Louisville Skating Academy in Louisville, Kentucky.

== Results ==
(with Roca)

International
Event	81-82	82–83	83–84	84–85	85–86	86–87
World Champ.				11th	6th	
Skate America					1st	
Skate Canada					1st	
NHK Trophy				5th		
National
U.S. Champ.	6th	4th	4th	2nd	1st	2nd
