= James Yorke (figure skater) =

American ice dancer

Personal information
- Other names: Jim Yorke
- Born: October 28, 1962
- Died: June 21, 2008 (aged 45) California

Figure skating career
- Country: United States
- Partner: Eleanor DeVera, Laura Wolfe, Ann Hensel, Renée Roca
- Retired: 1989

James "Jim" Yorke (October 28, 1962 – June 21, 2008) was an American ice dancer. Competing in partnership with Eleanor DeVera, he won silver medals at the 1983 Nebelhorn Trophy and Grand Prix International St. Gervais. He later competed with Ann Hensel where he won the 1987 Eastern sectionals, placed 6th at the US national championships, and member of the international team. In 1988 Jim teamed up with Renee Roca where he won the gold medal at the 1987 Prague Skate and bronze at the 1988 Skate America.

After ending his amateur career, Yorke skated professionally with Judy Blumberg and Kim Callahan. He worked as a coach at the Los Angeles Figure Skating Club, notably working with Mirai Nagasu. He died by suicide at his California home on June 21, 2008.

== Results ==
=== With Roca ===
International
Event	1987–88	1988–89
Prague Skate	1st	
Skate America		3rd
National
U.S. Championships	4th	WD
Eastern Sectionals	1st	
WD = Withdrew

=== With Hensel ===
National
Event	1985-86	1986–87
U.S. Championships	WD	5th
Eastern Sectionals		1st

=== With Wolfe ===
National
Event	1985
U.S. Championships	13th

=== With DeVera ===
International
Event	1982-83	1983–84
Grand Prix International St. Gervais		2nd
Nebelhorn Trophy		2nd
National
U.S. Championships	7th	10th
