= Wayne Seybold =

American politician and figure skater

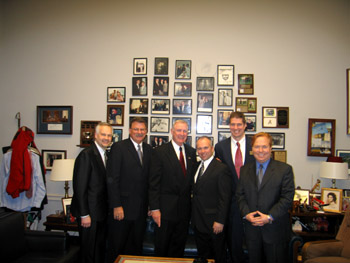
- Seybold with United States Congressman Dan Burton and Eric Walts

Mayor of Marion, Indiana
- In office January 1, 2004 – December 31, 2015
- Preceded by: Bill Henry
- Succeeded by: Jess Alumbaugh

Personal details
- Born: September 5, 1963 (age 62) Orlando, Florida

Wayne Seybold (born September 5, 1963) is formerly the mayor of Marion, Indiana and a former Olympic pair skater representing the United States.

Competing with his sister Natalie Seybold, he won five senior international medals, became a two-time U.S. national silver medalist, and competed at the 1988 Winter Olympics. The pair grew up in Marion, Indiana and were coached by Ronald Ludington from 1984 in Wilmington, Delaware.

After retiring from skating, Seybold returned to Marion, Indiana. Running as a Republican, he was elected mayor in 2003 and won re-election in 2007 and 2011. In 2012, Seybold ran for the 5th District Congressional seat but finished fourth in the Republican primary. In 2014, he ran for Indiana State Treasurer but lost the Republican nomination to director of the TrustINdiana local government investment pool Kelly Mitchell.

== Results ==
(with Natalie Seybold)

International
Event	82–83	83–84	84–85	85–86	86–87	87–88	88–89
Winter Olympics						10th	
World Champ.			9th	8th		10th	8th
Skate America	7th						3rd
Skate Canada			4th		3rd		4th
International de Paris						1st	
NHK Trophy					3rd		
Nebelhorn Trophy	3rd						
National
U.S. Champ.	9th	5th	2nd	3rd	4th	3rd	2nd

Preceded by Bill Henry	Mayor of Marion, Indiana; 2003-2015	Succeeded by Jess Alumbaugh
