= Natalie Seybold =

American pair skater

Personal information
- Full name: Natalie Kimberly Seybold-Catron
- Born: September 18, 1965 (age 60) Orlando, Florida, U.S.
- Height: 5 ft 2 in (1.57 m)

Figure skating career
- Country: United States
- Retired: 1989

Natalie Kimberly "Kim" Seybold-Catron (born September 18, 1965) is an American former pair skater. Competing with her brother Wayne Seybold, she won five senior international medals, became a two-time U.S. national silver medalist, and competed at the 1988 Winter Olympics. The pair grew up in Marion, Indiana and were coached by Ronald Ludington from 1984 in Wilmington, Delaware.

Seybold married a former hockey player, Mark Catron, with whom she has two daughters, Kaitlyn and Ashley. She underwent operations to remove a brain tumor in 1995, 2002 and 2006, resulting in numbness on the right side of her face and hearing loss in her right ear.

== Results ==
(with Seybold)

International
Event	82–83	83–84	84–85	85–86	86–87	87–88	88–89
Winter Olympics						10th	
World Champ.			9th	8th		10th	8th
Skate America	7th						3rd
Skate Canada			4th		3rd		4th
International de Paris						1st	
NHK Trophy					3rd		
Nebelhorn Trophy	3rd						
National
U.S. Champ.	9th	5th	2nd	3rd	4th	3rd	2nd
