= Angelo D'Agostino =

American figure skater (1963–2016)

Personal information
- Born: February 26, 1963
- Died: May 26, 2016 (aged 53) Palm Springs, California, U.S.

Figure skating career
- Country: United States
- Discipline: Men's singles
- Coach: Carlo Fassi, Christa Fassi, Christy Krall, Janet Champion, Phillip Mills, Candy Brown
- Skating club: Broadmoor Skating Club
- Retired: c. 1989

Angelo D'Agostino (February 26, 1963 – May 26, 2016) was an American figure skater. He was the 1986 NHK Trophy champion, 1985 Danubius Thermal Trophy champion, 1987 Grand Prix International de Paris silver medalist, and 1988 Skate Canada International bronze medalist.

D'Agostino was born to a German mother and Italian father. He was raised in Chicago and began learning to skate under Candy Brown. Later in his career, he was coached by Carlo Fassi and Christa Fassi with support from Christy Krall, Janet Champion, and Phillip Mills at the Broadmoor Skating Club.

After retiring from competition, D'Agostino performed in ice shows, including Ice Capades and Nutcracker on Ice, and worked as a coach, choreographer, and Dartfish motion analysis specialist in Chicago and Naperville, Illinois. He also spent twenty weeks a year on cruise ships installing casts, directing, and choreographing for Willy Bietak Production's ice shows. He died in Palm Springs, California in May 2016.

== Competitive highlights ==
International
Event	81–82	82-83	83-84	84–85	85–86	86–87	87–88	88–89
Danubius Trophy					1st			
Inter. de Paris							2nd	
NHK Trophy						1st		
Skate Canada								3rd
National
U.S. Champ.	6th J	2nd J	14th	9th	4th	6th	5th	6th
Eastern Sect.						1st		
J = Junior
