= Susan Dungjen =

American pair skater

Susan Dungjen (born April 7, 1970) is an American former pair skater. With brother Jason Dungjen, she is the 1984 World Junior silver medalist and the 1985 U.S. pewter medalist. They won the silver medal at the 1983 NHK Trophy.

== Competitive highlights ==
(with Jason Dungjen)

International
Event	1982–83	1983–84	1984–85	1985–86
World Junior Championships		2nd		
NHK Trophy		2nd	5th	
Grand Prix de St. Gervais			2nd	
National
U.S. Championships	1st J.	8th	4th	6th
