= Daniel Doran (figure skater) =

American figure skater

Personal information
- Born: c. 1967 (age 58–59)

Figure skating career
- Country: United States
- Discipline: Men's singles
- Retired: 1991

Daniel Doran (born c. 1967) is an American former competitive figure skater. He won gold at the 1985 Karl Schäfer Memorial and 1986 St. Ivel International, two Skate America medals, and two U.S. national medals. He placed in the top ten at the 1986 and 1989 World Championships. He was raised in Oak Lawn, Illinois.

== Competitive highlights ==
International
Event	81–82	82–83	83–84	85–86	86–87	87–88	88–89	89–90	90–91
World Championships				8th			7th		
International de Paris								4th	
NHK Trophy							4th		6th
Skate America					3rd		2nd		
Karl Schäfer Memorial				1st					
Prize of Moscow News						2nd			
St. Ivel International					1st				
National
U.S. Championships	2nd J	3rd J	6th	3rd	4th	4th	2nd	5th	10th
J = Junior
