= James Cygan =

American former figure skater

Personal information
- Other names: Jim Cygan

Figure skating career
- Country: United States
- Discipline: Men's singles
- Coach: Carlo Fassi
- Skating club: Broadmoor Skating Club
- Retired: c. 1989

James "Jim" Cygan is an American former figure skater. He is the 1982 Nebelhorn Trophy bronze medalist, 1986 Golden Spin of Zagreb bronze medalist, and 1989 Winter Universiade silver medalist. He belonged to the Broadmoor Skating Club in Colorado Springs, Colorado.

Beginning in the 1980–81 season, Cygan was coached by Carlo Fassi. He won the national junior men's title at the 1982 U.S. Championships, two years after becoming the U.S. novice champion. He placed 5th at the 1982 World Junior Championships in Oberstdorf, West Germany.

Cygan studied medicine at Northwestern University.

== Competitive highlights ==
International
| Event | 79–80 | 81–82 | 82–83 | 83–84 | 84–85 | 85–86 | 86–87 | 87–88 | 88–89 |
|---|---|---|---|---|---|---|---|---|---|
| Golden Spin | | | | | | | 3rd | | |
| Nebelhorn | | | 3rd | | | | | | |
| Prague Skate | | | | | 4th | | | 5th | |
| Skate Canada | | | | | | | | | 7th |
| Universiade | | | | | | | | | 2nd |
International: Junior
| Junior Worlds | | 5th | | | | | | | |
National
| U.S. Champ. | 1st N | 1st J | 10th | 13th | 11th | 6th | 9th | 7th | 7th |
Levels: N = Novice; J = Junior
