= Pacific Coast Sectional Figure Skating Championships =

Recurring figure skating competition

The Pacific Coast Sectional Figure Skating Championships is an annual figure skating competition sanctioned by U.S. Figure Skating. It is one of three sectional competitions, alongside the Midwestern Sectional Figure Skating Championships and Eastern Sectional Figure Skating Championships.

Skaters compete in five levels: Senior, Junior, Novice, Intermediate, and Juvenile. Medals are given out in four colors: gold (first), silver (second), bronze (third), and pewter (fourth). Stand-alone sectional competitions are held for men's singles and women's singles, but as of the 2022-23 season, not for ice dance or pairs. Per 2022 Governing Council approval, the pathway for advancement in the two partnered disciplines has changed to: National Qualifying Series directly to U.S. Ice Dance Final and U.S. Pairs Final (both for entries from all sections), and then to U.S. Figure Skating Championships.

== History ==
Modifications began in the 2019-20 season to the conventional structure that skaters who place in the top four at sectionals advance to U.S. Figure Skating Championships. As of the 2019-20 season, the top two Novice skaters per sectional in men's singles and in women's singles advance to Junior-level competition at U.S. Figure Skating Championships -- which no longer hold singles competition at the level of Novice, Intermediate, or Juvenile. Starting with the 2022-23 season, only the top two Senior skaters per sectional in men's singles and in women's singles have been guaranteed to advance to U.S. Figure Skating Championships; next-best sectional scores nationwide (across all sections, in other words) have become necessary for other Senior competitors to advance.

For ice dance and pairs, U.S. Figure Skating Championships discontinued Novice, Intermediate and Juvenile competition starting in the 2019-20 season, but brought back Novice ice dance and Novice pairs for the 2023-24 and 2024-25 seasons.

Starting in the 2019-20 season, top Novice, Intermediate, and Juvenile skaters from Sectional Singles Finals (as they now are named), U.S. Ice Dance Final, and U.S. Pairs Final qualify for National High Performance Development Team camp.

== Senior medalists ==
=== Men's singles ===
Senior men's event medalists
Year	Location	Gold	Silver	Bronze	Pewter	Ref.
1936	Yosemite, CA	Ernest Berry	John T. Owens	Richard Jorgensen	No pewter medals awarded	
1937	Seattle, WA	Eugene Turner	Ernest Berry	Robert Scott	No pewter medals awarded	
1938	Oakland, CA	Ernest Berry	Skippy Baxter	No other competitors	No pewter medals awarded	
1939	Los Angeles, CA	Eugene Turner	Skippy Baxter	No other competitors	No pewter medals awarded	
1940	Oakland, CA	Murray Galbraith	Sheldon Galbraith	No other competitors	No pewter medals awarded	
1941	Colorado Springs, CO	Eugene Turner	William Hart	Howell Janes	No pewter medals awarded	
1942	Seattle, WA	Jack Might	Marc Nelson	William Udell	No pewter medals awarded	
1943	Berkeley, CA	Marc Nelson	James Lochead Jr.	No other competitors	No pewter medals awarded	
1944	No competition held				No pewter medals awarded	
1945	No competition held				No pewter medals awarded	
1946	Los Angeles, CA	James Lochead	John Tuckerman	Peter Kennedy	No pewter medals awarded	
1947	No competition held				No pewter medals awarded	
1948	Seattle, WA	Austin Holt	Ronnie Pugh	Bobby Simmonds	No pewter medals awarded	
1949	San Diego, CA	Richard Dwyer	Bobby Simmonds	Evy Scotvold	No pewter medals awarded	
1950	Berkeley, CA	Barry Gorman	Jack Boyle	Armando Rodriguez	No pewter medals awarded	
1951	Los Angeles, CA	Evy Scotvold	Armando Rodriguez	Bill Nick	No pewter medals awarded	
1952	Los Angeles, CA	Armando Rodriquez	Richard Bromley	Bill Nick	No pewter medals awarded	
1953	Seattle, WA	William Nick	Timothy Brown	Tommy Moore	No pewter medals awarded	
1954	Berkeley, CA	Tim Brown	Armando Rodriquez	Tommy Moore	No pewter medals awarded	
1955	Los Angeles, CA	Tom Moore	Robert Lee Brewer	Lorin Caccamise	No pewter medals awarded	
1956	Berkeley, CA	Richard Swenning	Robert Lee Brewer	James Short	No pewter medals awarded	
1957	Los Angeles, CA	James Short	Don Mike Anthony	Lorin Caccamise	No pewter medals awarded	
1958	Seattle, WA	James Short	Don Mike Anthony	James Murray	No pewter medals awarded	
1959	Los Angeles, CA	Don Mike Anthony	Harvey Balch	Dick Paice	No pewter medals awarded	
1960	Squaw Valley, CA	Don Mike Anthony	Richard Vraa	Harvey Balch	No pewter medals awarded	
1961	Los Angeles, CA	Buddy Zack	Ronnie Frank	Walter Hypes	No pewter medals awarded	
1962		Buddy Zack	Walter Hypes	Robert Madden	No pewter medals awarded	
1963	Berkeley, CA	William Chapel	Buddy Zack	Ronnie Frank	No pewter medals awarded	
1964	Burbank, CA	Ronnie Frank	Johnny Moore	Walter Hypes	No pewter medals awarded	
1965	Seattle, WA	Ronnie Frank	John Misha Petkevich	Johnny Moore	No pewter medals awarded	
1966	Culver City, CA	John Misha Petkevich	Barry Munns	Johnny Moore	No pewter medals awarded	
1967	Berkeley, CA	John Misha Petkevich	Ronnie Frank	Barry Munns	No pewter medals awarded	
1968	Beaverton, OR	John Misha Petkevich	Brad Hislop	Roger Bass	No pewter medals awarded	
1969	Los Angeles, CA	Ken Shelley	Roger Bass	Brad Hislop	No pewter medals awarded	
1970	Berkeley, CA	Ken Shelley	Roger Bass	Robert Bradshaw	No pewter medals awarded	
1971	Seattle, WA	Jimmy Demogines	Charlie Tickner	Mark Rehfield	No pewter medals awarded	
1972	Berkeley, CA	Robert Bradshaw	John Baldwin	Richard Ewell	No pewter medals awarded	
1973	Culver City, CA	Robert Bradshaw	Terry Kubicka	Mark Rehfield	No pewter medals awarded	
1974	Portland, OR	Terry Kubicka	John Carlow, Jr.	William Schneider	No pewter medals awarded	
1975	San Diego, CA	Ken Newfield	Randy Gardner	John Carlow, Jr.	No pewter medals awarded	
1976	Berkeley, CA	Ken Newfield	Randy Gardner	Perry Jewell	No pewter medals awarded	
1977	Seattle, WA	John Carlow, Jr.	Randy Gardner	Scott Carson	No pewter medals awarded	
1978	Burbank, CA	Mark Cockerell	Robert Wagenhoffer	Scott Carson	No pewter medals awarded	
1979	Santa Rosa, CA	Robert Wagenhoffer	John Carlow, Jr.	Brian Boitano	No pewter medals awarded	
1980	Great Falls, MT	Robert Wagenhoffer	Brian Boitano	Mark Cockerell	No pewter medals awarded	
1981	Culver City, CA	Brian Boitano	Mark Cockerell	Patrick Page	No pewter medals awarded	
1982	Salt Lake City, UT	Brian Boitano	Mark Cockerell	John Filbig	No pewter medals awarded	
1983	Tacoma, WA	Brian Boitano	Mark Cockerell	Scott Williams	No pewter medals awarded	
1984	Paramount, CA	Brian Boitano	Christopher Bowman	Scott Williams	No pewter medals awarded	
1985	San Diego, CA	Mark Cockerell	Christopher Bowman	Craig Henderson	No pewter medals awarded	
1986	Spokane, WA	John Filbig	Craig Henderson	Scott Kurttila	No pewter medals awarded	
1987	Phoenix, AZ	Christopher Bowman	Scott Kurttila	Erik Larson	Troy Goldstein	
1988	Stockton, CA	Scott Kurttila	John Filbig	Patrick Brault	Craig Heath	
1989	Lynnwood, WA	Erik Larson	Craig Heath	Troy Goldstein	Christopher Mitchell	
1990	San Diego, CA	Todd Eldredge	Doug Mattis	Craig Heath	Troy Goldstein	
1991	Bountiful, UT	Christopher Bowman	Erik Larson	Rudy Galindo	Doug Mattis	
1992	Tacoma, WA	Rudy Galindo	Troy Goldstein	Christopher Beck	Andre McGaughey	
1993	Las Vegas, NV	Rudy Galindo	Steven Smith	Larry Holliday	No other competitors	
1994	Redwood City, CA	Rudy Galindo	John Baldwin	Larry Holliday	Glenn Armstrong	
1995	Portland, OR	Rudy Galindo	John Baldwin	Derek Stedingh	Russ Scott	
1996	Burbank, CA	Rudy Galindo	Johnnie Bevan	John Baldwin	Trifun Zivanovic	
1997	Bountiful, UT	Michael Chack	Trifun Zivanovic	John Baldwin	Jere Michael	
1998	Mountlake Terrace, WA	Michael Chack	Trifun Zivanovic	John Baldwin	Jere Michael	
1999	Scottsdale, AZ	Trifun Zivanovic	Michael Chack	John Baldwin	Justin Dillon	
2000	San Jose, CA	Justin Dillon	Johnnie Bevan	John Baldwin	Don Baldwin	
2001	Anchorage, AK	Justin Dillon	Johnnie Bevan	Don Baldwin	Robert Brathwaite	
2002	Burbank, CA	Michael Villarreal	Don Baldwin	Michael Sasaki	Sean Calvillo	
2003	Salt Lake City, UT	Nicholas LaRoche	Michael Villarreal	Danny Clausen	Jordan Wilson	
2004	Vancouver, WA	Dennis Phan	Jordan Wilson	Justin Dillon	Michael Villarreal	
2005	Escondido, CA	Nicholas LaRoche	Christopher Toland	Jordan Wilson	Daniel Steffel	
2006	Roseville, CA	Dennis Phan	Nicholas LaRoche	Jordan Wilson	Michael Villarreal	
2007	Mountlake Terrace, WA	Michael Villarreal	Daisuke Murakami	Dennis Phan	Nicholas LaRoche	
2008	San Diego, CA	Dennis Phan	Michael Villarreal	Geoffry Varner	Douglas Razzano	
2009	Scottsdale, AZ	Dennis Phan	Douglas Razzano	Scott Smith	Nicholas LaRoche	
2010	Jackson Hole, WY	Douglas Razzano	Keegan Messing	Andrew Gonzales	Dennis Phan	
2011	Culver City, CA	Jonathan Cassar	Christopher Caluza	Andrew Gonzales	Sean Rabbitt	
2012	Salt Lake City, UT	Douglas Razzano	Jonathan Cassar	Keegan Messing	Scott Dyer	
2013	Provo, UT	Keegan Messing	Jonathan Cassar	Philip Warren	Sean Rabbitt	
2014	Oakland, CA	Douglas Razzano	Sean Rabbitt	Philip Warren	Keegan Messing	
2015	Spokane, WA	Nathan Chen	Sean Rabbitt	Shotaro Omori	Philip Warren	
2016	Burbank, CA	Sean Rabbitt	Shotaro Omori	Scott Dyer	Daniel Kulenkamp	
2017	Salt Lake City, UT	Sean Rabbitt	Shotaro Omori	Scott Dyer	Daniel Kulenkamp	
2018	Spokane, WA	Sean Rabbitt	Daniel Kulenkamp	Scott Dyer	Sebastien Payannet	
2019	Salt Lake City, UT	Sean Rabbitt	Sebastien Payannet	Daniel Kulenkamp	William Hubbart	
2020	Wenatchee, WA	Joonsoo Kim	Yaroslav Paniot	Dinh Tran	Sean Rabbitt	
2021	No competition held due to the COVID-19 pandemic					
2022	No competition held due to the COVID-19 pandemic					
2023	San Francisco, CA	Joonsoo Kim	Yaroslav Paniot	Goku Endo	Samuel Mindra	
2024	Tacoma, WA	Goku Endo	Yaroslav Paniot	Kai Kovar	Michael Xie	
2025	Ogden, UT	Goku Endo	Kai Kovar	Liam Kapeikis	Michael Xie	
2026	Henderson, NV	Goku Endo	Samuel Mindra	Michael Xie	Dmitri Murphy	

=== Women's singles ===
Senior women's event medalists
Year	Location	Gold	Silver	Bronze	Pewter	Ref.
1936	Yosemite, CA	Mary Taylor	Marianne Lindelof	No other competitors	No pewter medals awarded	
1937	Seattle, WA	Marianne Lindelof	Mary Taylor	Barbara Ann Gingg	No pewter medals awarded	
1938	Oakland, CA	Barbara Ann Gingg	Marianne Lindelof	Mary Taylor	No pewter medals awarded	
1939	Los Angeles, CA	Barbara Ann Gingg	Ramona Allen	Britta Lundequist	No pewter medals awarded	
1940	Oakland, CA	Ramona Allen	Britta Lundequist	Jean Sturgeon	No pewter medals awarded	
1941	Colorado Springs, CO	Ramona Allen	Britta Lundequist	Donna Atwood	No pewter medals awarded	
1942	Seattle, WA	Ramona Allen	Marcella May	No other competitors	No pewter medals awarded	
1943	Berkeley, CA	Beverly Licht	Shirley Lander	Barbara Uhl	No pewter medals awarded	
1944	Berkeley, CA	Shirley Lander	Barbara Uhl	Helen Uhl	No pewter medals awarded	
1945	Seattle, WA	Shirley Lander	Carole Gregory	Margaret Field	No pewter medals awarded	
1946	Los Angeles, CA	Shirley Lander	Carole Gregory	Helen Uhl	No pewter medals awarded	
1947	Colorado Springs, CO	Helen Uhl	Carolyn Welch	Letha Linn	No pewter medals awarded	
1948	Seattle, WA	Helen Uhl	Gloria Peterson	Letha Linn	No pewter medals awarded	
1949	San Diego, CA	Gloria Peterson	Frances Dorsey	Eleanor Levorsen	No pewter medals awarded	
1950	Berkeley, CA	Frances Dorsey	Lois Secreto	Zella May Harrington	No pewter medals awarded	
1951	Los Angeles, CA	Frances Dorsey	Patricia Firth	Nancy Kay Bates-Lane	No pewter medals awarded	
1952	Los Angeles, CA	Patricia Firth	Catherine Machado	Nancy Kay Bates-Lane	No pewter medals awarded	
1953	Seattle, WA	Patricia Firth	Patricia Quick	Catherine Machado	No pewter medals awarded	
1954	Berkeley, CA	Catherine Machado	Sherry Dorey	Joan Schenke	No pewter medals awarded	
1955	Los Angeles, CA	Sherry Dorey	Janice Marie Crappa	Dee Dee Wayland	No pewter medals awarded	
1956	Berkeley, CA	Sherry Dorey	Dee Dee Wayland	Joan Schenke	No pewter medals awarded	
1957	Los Angeles, CA	Barbara Ann Roles	LaRee Coyle	Gloria Linek	No pewter medals awarded	
1958	Seattle, WA	Barbara Ann Roles	DeAnn Beideck	Kathleen Seabeck	No pewter medals awarded	
1959	Los Angeles, CA	Rhode Lee Michelson	Karen Howland	Carol Galloway	No pewter medals awarded	
1960	Squaw Valley, CA	Karen Howland	Rhode Lee Michelson	Mary Crowley	No pewter medals awarded	
1961	Los Angeles, CA	Michelle Monnier	Wanda Mae guntert	Linda Galbraith	No pewter medals awarded	
1962		Michelle Monnier	Kristin Mittun	Sonda Lee Holmes	No pewter medals awarded	
1963	Berkeley, CA	Peggy Fleming	Michelle Monnier	Sonda Lee Holmes	No pewter medals awarded	
1964	Burbank, CA	Sondra Holmes	Shari Bates	Kristin Mittun	No pewter medals awarded	
1965	Seattle, WA	Sharon Bates	Jennie Walsh	Sandra Lee Holmes	No pewter medals awarded	
1966	Culver City, CA	Diane Schatz	Julie Lynn Holmes	Kim Millett	No pewter medals awarded	
1967	Berkeley, CA	Jennie Walsh	Sandra Lee Holmes	Charlene McLaren	No pewter medals awarded	
1968	Beaverton, OR	Dawn Glab	Julie Lynn Holmes	Debrah Lauer	No pewter medals awarded	
1969	Los Angeles, CA	Dawn Glab	Debrah Lauer	Jennie Walsh	No pewter medals awarded	
1970	Berkeley, CA	Dawn Glab	Jennie Walsh	Christy Ito	No pewter medals awarded	
1971	Seattle, WA	Juli McKinstry	Sheri Thrapp	Julia Johnson	No pewter medals awarded	
1972	Berkeley, CA	Patrica Shelley	Jennie Walsh	Julia Johnson	No pewter medals awarded	
1973	Culver City, CA	Wendy Burge	Donna Arquilla	Donna Albert	No pewter medals awarded	
1974	Portland, OR	Wendy Burge	Donna Albert	Roberta Loughland	No pewter medals awarded	
1975	San Diego, CA	Barbie Smith	Wendy Burge	Linda Fratianne	No pewter medals awarded	
1976	Berkeley, CA	Lina Fratianne	Lisa-Marie Allen	Suzie Brasher	No pewter medals awarded	
1977	Seattle, WA	Suzie Brasher	Jeanne Chapman	Tai Babilonia	No pewter medals awarded	
1978	Burbank, CA	Linda Fratianne	Lisa-Marie Allen	Carrie Rugh	No pewter medals awarded	
1979	Santa Rosa, CA	Linda Fratianne	Lisa-Marie Allen	Carrie Rugh	No pewter medals awarded	
1980	Great Falls, MT	Linda Fratianne	Lynn Smith	Aimee Kravette	No pewter medals awarded	
1981	Culver City, CA	Rosalynn Sumners	Stephanie Anderson	Kristy Hogan	No pewter medals awarded	
1982	Salt Lake City, UT	Rosalynn Sumners	Tiffany Chin	Maria Causey	No pewter medals awarded	
1983	Tacoma, WA	Jennifer Newman	Maria Causey	Debi Thomas	No pewter medals awarded	
1984	Paramount, CA	Debi Thomas	Sara MacInnes	Yvonne Gomez	No pewter medals awarded	
1985	San Diego, CA	Tiffany Chin	Debi Thomas	Yvonne Gomez	No pewter medals awarded	
1986	Spokane, WA	Kathryn Adams	Tonya Harding	Debbie LaVerde	No pewter medals awarded	
1987	Phoenix, AZ	Rory Flack	Yvonne Gomez	Kathryn Adams	Joan Colignon	
1988	Stockton, CA	Holly Cook	Cindy Bortz	Jeri Campbell	Rory Flack	
1989	Lynnwood, WA	Kristi Yamaguchi	Holly Cook	Tonya Harding	Cindy Bortz	
1990	San Diego, CA	Holly Cook	Jeri Campbell	Tisha Walker	Dena Galech	
1991	Bountiful, UT	Tonya Harding	Tisha Walker	Jeri Campbell	Tamara Kuchiki	
1992	Tacoma, WA	Dena Galech	Julie Shott	Jennifer Itoh	Sarabeth Gendreau	
1993	Las Vegas, NV	Michelle Kwan	Keri-Anne Thomas	Natasha Kuckiki	Dena Galech	
1994	Redwood City, CA	Jennifer Verrill	Keri-Anne Thomas	Melissa Ann Nelson	Lisa Talbot	
1995	Portland, OR	Karen Kwan	Laura Lipetsky	Michelle Cho	Joanna Ng	
1996	Burbank, CA	Sydne Vogel	Angela Nikodinov	Amber Corwin	Karen Kwan	
1997	Bountiful, UT	Angela Nikodinov	Serena Phillips	Diane Halber	Jacqie Turner	
1998	Mountlake Terrace, WA	Amber Corwin	Sarah Devereaux	Cohen Duncan	Amy Evidente	
1999	Scottsdale, AZ	Naomi Nari Nam	Sydne Vogel	Kristy Evans	Elizabeth O'Donnell	
2000	San Jose, CA	Sasha Cohen	Cohen Duncan	Kimberly Kilby	Susan Ng	
2001	Anchorage, AK	Amber Corwin	Beatrisa Liang	Stephanie Chase-Bass	Ye Bin Mok	
2002	Burbank, CA	Beatrisa Liang	Ye Bin Mok	Christina Gordon	Joan Cristobal	
2003	Salt Lake City, UT	Beatrisa Liang	Kailee Watson	Kim Ryan	Joan Cristobal	
2004	Vancouver, WA	Angela Nikodinov	Aanya Reiten	Stephanie Rosenthal	Felicia Beck	
2005	Escondido, CA	Beatrisa Liang	Stephanie Rosenthal	Yebin Mok	Shanell Noji	
2006	Roseville, CA	Danielle Kahle	Stephanie Rosenthal	Amy Evidente	Anna Madorsky	
2007	Mountlake Terrace, WA	Danielle Kahle	Erin Reed	Becky Hughes	Margaret Wang	
2008	San Diego, CA	Tenile Victorsen	Laney Diggs	Danielle Kahle	Karen Zhou	
2009	Scottsdale, AZ	Karen Zhou	Laney Diggs	Tenile Victorsen	Chrissy Hughes	
2010	Jackson Hole, WY	Beatrisa Liang	Kristiene Gong	Laney Diggs	Amanda Dobbs	
2011	Culver City, CA	Vanessa Lam	Danielle Kahle	Keli Zhou	Ellie Kawamura	
2012	Salt Lake City, UT	Leah Keiser	Caroline Zhang	Angela Wang	Sophia Adams	
2013	Provo, UT	Vanessa Lam	Courtney Hicks	Sophia Adams	Amanda Hofmann	
2014	Oakland, CA	Vanessa Lam	Rachael Flatt	Leah Keiser	Caroline Zhang	
2015	Spokane, WA	Karen Chen	Leah Keiser	Tyler Pierce	Caroline Zhang	
2016	Burbank, CA	Carly Gold	Maria Yang	Elena Pulkinen	Alexis Gagnon	
2017	Salt Lake City, UT	Angela Wang	Caroline Zhang	Livvy Shilling	Paige Rydberg	
2018	Spokane, WA	Starr Andrews	Tessa Hong	Vivian Le	Kaitlyn Nguyen	
2019	Salt Lake City, UT	Alysa Liu	Akari Nakahara	Brynne McIsaac	Sierra Venetta	
2020	Wenatchee, WA	Caitlin Ha	Sierra Venetta	Emilia Murdock	Alex Evans	
2021	No competition held due to the COVID-19 pandemic					
2022	No competition held due to the COVID-19 pandemic					
2023	San Francisco, CA	Josephine Lee	Hanna Harrell	Lindsay Wang	Michelle Lee	
2024	Tacoma, WA	Josephine Lee	Katie Shen	Mia Kalin	Soho Lee	
2025	Ogden, UT	Sherry Zhang	Starr Andrews	Katie Shen	Erica Machida	
2026	Henderson, NV	Katie Shen	Anabel Wallace	Soho Lee	Lindsay Wang	

=== Pairs ===
Senior pairs event medalists
Year	Location	Gold	Silver	Bronze	Pewter	Ref.
1936	Yosemite, CA	Frances Wright; Howell Janes	Therese Jorgensen; Richard Jorgensen	Pauline Neuman; Ray Young	No pewter medals awarded	
1937	Seattle, WA	Barbara Ann Gingg; Lloyd Baxter	Therese Jorgensen; Richard Jorgensen	Edna Holmes; Ernest Berry	No pewter medals awarded	
1938	Oakland, CA	Barbara Ann Gingg; Lloyd Baxter	Edna Holmes; Ernest Berry	Patricia Merifield; Damian Bourque	No pewter medals awarded	
1939	Los Angeles, CA	Betty Lee Bennett; John Kinney	Pauline Neuman; Ray Young	No other competitors	No pewter medals awarded	
1940	Oakland, CA	Jean Sturgeon; Murray Galbraith	Dorothy Beymer; Ralph Beymer	Margaret Fields; Sheldon Galbraith	No pewter medals awarded	
1941	Colorado Springs, CO	Patricia Vaeth; Jack Might	Donna Atwood; Eugene Turner	No other competitors	No pewter medals awarded	
1942	Seattle, WA	Margaret Field; Jack Might	Georgia Shattuck; Robert Turk	Jane Ramussen; William Udell	No pewter medals awarded	
1943	Berkeley, CA	Barbara deJulio; Austin Holt	Marilyn Grace; James Lochead Jr.	Peggy Egan; Richard Burgess	No pewter medals awarded	
1944	Berkeley, CA	Karol Kennedy; Peter Kennedy	Marcella May; James Lochead Jr.	Peggy Egan; Arnold Hillstrom	No pewter medals awarded	
1945	Berkeley, CA	Karol Kennedy; Peter Kennedy	Edith Hale; Vern Hale	No other competitors	No pewter medals awarded	
1946	Los Angeles, CA	Karol Kennedy; Peter Kennedy	Barbara de Julio; Herman Maricich	No other competitors	No pewter medals awarded	
1947	Colorado Springs, CO	Carolyn Welch; Charles Brinkman	Joan Hompes; Calvin Cook	No other competitors	No pewter medals awarded	
1948	Seattle, WA	Anne Holt; Austin Holt	Gloria Jeske; Ed Worth	Letha Lou Linn; Glenn Seaburg	No pewter medals awarded	
1949	San Diego, CA	No competition held			No pewter medals awarded	
1950	Berkeley, CA	Patsy Hamm; Jack Boyle	Joyce Lockwood; Art Gelien	No other competitors	No pewter medals awarded	
1951	Los Angeles, CA	Anne Holt; Austin Holt	Sharon Choate; Richard Bromley	Barbara Ziem; Armando Rodriguez	No pewter medals awarded	
1952	Los Angeles, CA	Barbara Ziem; Armando Rodriguez	Gloria Rowe; Robert Leip	Sharon Choate; Richard Bromley	No pewter medals awarded	
1953	Seattle, WA	Carole Ann Ormaca; Robin Greiner	Dawn May; David Hertz	Agnes Tyson; Harry Craycroft	No pewter medals awarded	
1954	Berkeley, CA	Dawn May; David Hertz	Melinda Lelliott; Art Jenkins	Sandra Hardin; James Barlow	No pewter medals awarded	
1955	Los Angeles, CA	Patricia Kilgore; James Barlow	Agnes Tyson; Richard Swenning	Melinda Lelliott; Art Jenkins	No pewter medals awarded	
1956	Berkeley, CA	Carol Lux; James Barlow	Nancy Copeland; Roy Cofer	No other competitors	No pewter medals awarded	
1957	Los Angeles, CA	Anita Tefkin; James Barlow	Sharon Constable; John Hertz	No other competitors	No pewter medals awarded	
1958	Seattle, WA	Sheila Wells; Robin Greiner	Ila Ray Hadley; Ray Hadley	Mary Lou Raymond; Jack Nankervis	No pewter medals awarded	
1959	Los Angeles, CA	Ila Ray Hadley; Ray Hadley	Judi Fotheringill; Jerry Fotheringill	Mary Lou Raymond; Jack Nankervis	No pewter medals awarded	
1960	Squaw Valley, CA	Ila Ray Hadley; Ray Hadley	Judi Fotheringill; Jerry Fotheringill	Laurie Hickox; Bill Hickox	No pewter medals awarded	
1961	Los Angeles, CA	No competition held			No pewter medals awarded	
1962		Cynthia Kauffman; Ronald Kauffman	Sharon Constable; Jeff Flowers	No other competitors	No pewter medals awarded	
1963	Berkeley, CA	Cynthia Kauffman; Ronald Kauffman	Yvonne Littlefield; Peter Betts	Susie Berens; Robert Sable	No pewter medals awarded	
1964	Burbank, CA	Christine Simon; Edwin Kelsey	Linda Heiser; Edward Murray Jr.	Kathleen Mason; Larry Snider	No pewter medals awarded	
1965	Seattle, WA	Susan Berens; Roy Wagelein	Page Paulsen; Larry Dusich	Sharon Bates; Richard Inglesi	No pewter medals awarded	
1966	Culver City, CA	Sandi Sweitzer; Jerry Entwistle	JoJo Starbuck; Kenneth Shelley	No other competitors	No pewter medals awarded	
1967	Berkeley, CA	Page Paulsen; Larry Dusich	Sandi Sweitzer; Jerry Entwistle	No other competitors	No pewter medals awarded	
1968	Beaverton, OR	JoJo Starbuck; Kenneth Shelley	Page Paulsen; Larry Dusich	No other competitors	No pewter medals awarded	
1969	Los Angeles, CA	JoJo Starbuck; Kenneth Shelley	Sheri Thrapp; Larry Dusich	Jill Ritchie; Ralph Meredith	No pewter medals awarded	
1970	Berkeley, CA	No competition held			No pewter medals awarded	
1971	Seattle, WA	No competition held			No pewter medals awarded	
1972	Berkeley, CA	Cynthia Van Valkenburgh; James Hulick	Julianne Johnson; Kent Johnson	No other competitors	No pewter medals awarded	
1973	Culver City, CA	Jodie Martin; Roger Berry	Cynthia Van Valkenburgh; James Hulick	No other competitors	No pewter medals awarded	
1974	Portland, OR	Tai Babilonia; Randy Gardner	Erika Susman; Thomas Huff	No other competitors	No pewter medals awarded	
1975	San Diego, CA	Tai Babilonia; Randy Gardner	Erika Susman; Thomas Huff	Lisa Carey; Douglas Varvais	No pewter medals awarded	
1976	Berkeley, CA	Tai Babilonia; Randy Gardner	Lisa Carey; Douglas Varvais	Joyce Hanson; Tony Paul Kudrna	No pewter medals awarded	
1977	Seattle, WA	Tai Babilonia; Randy Gardner	Tracy Prussack; Scott Prussack	Lyndy Marron; Hal Marron	No pewter medals awarded	
1978	Burbank, CA	Tai Babilonia; Randy Gardner	Vicki Heasley; Robert Wagenhoffer	Tracy Prussack; Scott Prussack	No pewter medals awarded	
1979	Santa Rosa, CA	Tai Babilonia; Randy Gardner	Vicki Heasley; Robert Wagenhoffer	Maria DiDomenico; Larry Schrier	No pewter medals awarded	
1980	Great Falls, MT	Tai Babilonia; Randy Gardner	Vicki Heasley; Robert Wagenhoffer	Maria DiDomenico; Larry Schrier	No pewter medals awarded	
1981	Culver City, CA	Maria DiDomenico; Burt Lancon	Beth Flora; Ken Flora	Vicki Heasley; Peter Oppegard	No pewter medals awarded	
1982	Salt Lake City, UT	No competition held			No pewter medals awarded	
1983	Tacoma, WA	Jill Watson; Burt Lancon	Maria DiDomenico; Peter Oppegard	Katy Keeley; Gary Kemp	No pewter medals awarded	
1984	Paramount, CA	Katy Keeley; Gary Kemp	Paula Obdyke; Craig Gill	No other competitors	No pewter medals awarded	
1985	San Diego, CA	Karen Courtland; Robert Daw	Katy Keeley; Joseph Mero	Jill Watson; Peter Oppegard	No pewter medals awarded	
1986	Spokane, WA	Jill Watson; Peter Oppegard	Lori Blasko; Todd Sand	Katy Keeley; Joseph Mero	No pewter medals awarded	
1987	Phoenix, AZ	Katy Keeley; Joseph Mero	Lori Blasko; Todd Sand	Sharon Carz; Doug Williams	Ashley Stevenson; Scott Wendland	
1988	Stockton, CA	Lori Blasko; Todd Sand	Sharon Carz; Doug Williams	Kellie Creel; Bob Pellaton	Shelly Propson; Scott Wendland	
1989	Lynnwood, WA	Sharon Carz; Doug Williams	Kenna Bailey; John Denton	Kellie Creel; Bob Pellaton	No other competitors	
1990	San Diego, CA	Natasha Kuchiki; Todd Sand	Sharon Carz; Doug Williams	Kellie Creel; Bob Pellaton	Vanessa April Moore; Todd Reynolds	
1991	Bountiful, UT	Sharon Carz; Doug Williams	Tristen Vega; Richard Alexander	Jenni Meno; Scott Wendland	Dawn Goldstein; Troy Goldstein	
1992	Tacoma, WA	Tristen Vega; Richard Alexander	Tracey Damigella; Doug Williams	Sharon Carz; John Denton	Dawn Goldstein; Troy Goldstein	
1993	Las Vegas, NV	Jenni Meno; Todd Sand	Dawn Piepenbrink; Nick Castaneda	No other competitors		
1994	Redwood City, CA	Tracey Damigella; Doug Williams	Erin Moorad; Richard Gillam	Sharon Carz; Troy Goldstein	Dawn Piepenbrink; Nick Castaneda	
1995	Portland, OR	Stephanie Stiegler; Lance Travis	Romina Baron; Richard Alexander	Erin Moorad; Richard Gillam	Dawn Piepenbrink; Nick Castaneda	
1996	Burbank, CA	Stephanie Stiegler; John Zimmerman	Romina Baron; Richard Alexander	Nicole Perry; Paul Dulebohn	Dawn Piepenbrink; Nick Castaneda	
1997	Bountiful, UT	Stephanie Stiegler; John Zimmerman	Naomi Grabow; Benjamin Oberman	Dawn Piepenbrink; Nick Castaneda	Erin Moorad; Richard Gillam	
1998	No competition held					
1999	Scottsdale, AZ	Natalie Vlandis; James Peterson	Amanda Magarian; Jered Guzman	Whitney Gaynor; David Delago	Trisha Hayes; Richard Gillam	
2000	San Jose, CA	Natalie Vlandis; James Peterson	Whitney Gaynor; David Delago	Trisha Hayes; Richard Gillam	No other competitors	
2001	Anchorage, AK	Jessica Miller; Jeffrey Weiss	Lindsay Rogeness; Brian Rogeness	Rena Inoue; John Baldwin	No other competitors	
2002	Burbank, CA	Tiffany Stiegler; Johnnie Stiegler	Sima Ganaba; Amir Ganaba	Jennifer Don; Jered Guzman	Lindsay Rogeness; Brian Rogeness	
2003	Salt Lake City, UT	Tiffany Stiegler; Johnnie Stiegler	Emma Phibbs; Devin Patrick	Jacqueline Matson; Don Baldwin	Lindsay Rogeness; Brian Rogeness	
2004	Vancouver, WA	Tiffany Stiegler; Bert Cording	Tiffany Sfikas; Jeffrey Weiss	Janice Mayne; Michael Modro	Lindsay Rogeness; Brian Rogeness	
2005	Escondido, CA	Stephanie Kuban; Laureano Ibarra	Julian Burns; Themistocles Leftheris	Marisa Sharma; Amir Ganaba	Lauren-Marie Simm; Devin Matthews	
2006	Roseville, CA	Naomi Nari Nam; Themistocles Leftheris	Marisa Sharma; Amir Ganaba	Janice Mayne; Ethan Burgess	Katie Uhlig; Michael Modro	
2007	Mountlake Terrace, WA	Marisa Sharma; Ethan Burgess	MeeRan Trombley; Laureano Ibarra	Katie Beriau; Alexander Merritt	Rhea Sy; Cole Davis	
2008	San Diego, CA	MeeRan Trombley; Laureano Ibarra	Katie Beriau; Alexander Merritt	Laura Lepzinski; Ethan Burgess	No other competitors	
2009	Scottsdale, AZ	Lindsay Davis; Alexander Merritt	Jennifer Bruhn; Don Baldwin	Bianca Butler; Joseph Jacobsen	Laura Lepzinski; Ethan Burgess	
2010	Jackson Hole, WY	Tiffany Vise; Don Baldwin	Laura Lepzinski; Ethan Burgess	Angelyn Nguyen; Themistocles Leftheris	Amanda Dobbs; Joseph Jacobsen	
2011- 2013	No competition held					
2014	Oakland, CA	Jessica Calalang; Zack Sidhu	Jessica Pfund; AJ Reiss	No other competitors		
2015	Spokane, WA	Anya Davidovich; AJ Reiss	No other competitors			
2016- 2020	No competition held					
2021	No competition held due to the COVID-19 pandemic					
2022	No competition held due to the COVID-19 pandemic					
2023	No competition held					
2024	Tacoma, WA	Katie McBeath; Daniil Parkman	Alisa Efimova; Misha Mitrofanov	Isabelle Martins; Ryan Bedard	Ellie Korytek; Timmy Chapman	
2025- 2026	No competition held					

=== Ice Dance ===
Senior ice dance event medalists
Year	Location	Gold	Silver	Bronze	Pewter	Ref.
1938	Oakland, CA	Barbara Ann Gingg; Drexel Gibbins	Marianne Lindelof; Lloyd Baxter	Edna Holmes; Ernest Berry	No pewter medals awarded	
1939	Los Angeles, CA	Barbara Ann Gingg; Drexel Gibbins	Edith Musser; Howell Janes	Fay Simon; Eugene Turner	No pewter medals awarded	
1940	Oakland, CA	Barbara Ann Gingg; Drexel Gibbins	Edith Musser; Howell Janes	No other competitors	No pewter medals awarded	
1941	Colorado Springs, CO	Elizabeth Kennedy; Eugene Turner	Barbara Ann Gingg; Howell Janes	June Rasmussen; Bill Udell	No pewter medals awarded	
1942	Seattle, WA	Ramona Allen; Herman Torrano	Marcella May; James Lochead	June Ramussen; William Udell	No pewter medals awarded	
1943	Berkeley, CA	Marcella May; James Lochead Jr.	Carmel Hawkins; Leonard Klima	Doryann Killian; George Lafferty	No pewter medals awarded	
1944	Berkeley, CA	Marcella May; James Lochead Jr.	Jeanine Voigt; Robert Leip	Camilla Cliff; Fred Kienle	No pewter medals awarded	
1945	Seattle, WA	Kathe Mehl Williams; Robert Swenning	Anne Davies; Carleton Hoffner Jr.	Betty Jean Higgins; Lyman Wakefield Jr.	No pewter medals awarded	
1946	Los Angeles, CA				No pewter medals awarded	
1947	Colorado Springs, CO	Marcella May Willis; Frank Davenport	Renee Stein; Sidney Moore	Mary Firth; Wilfred Brown	No pewter medals awarded	
1948	Seattle, WA	Carmel Waterbury; Edward Bodel	Renee Stein; Sidney Moore	No other competitors	No pewter medals awarded	
1949	San Diego, CA	Renee Stein; Sidney Moore	Carmel Bodel; Edward Bodel	Eleanor Bucher; Ray Hanna	No pewter medals awarded	
1950	Berkeley, CA	Jean Beach Robinson; Bruce Hannah	Joan Kelley; Ronald Junso	Vera Logstrup; Ray Hannah	No pewter medals awarded	
1951	Los Angeles, CA	Carmel Bodel; Edward Bodel	Jean Robinson; Bruce Hannah	Kathleen Heyler; Robert Miller	No pewter medals awarded	
1952	Los Angeles, CA	Carmel Bodel; Edward Bodel	Kathleen Heyler; Robert Miller	Sharon Choate; Richard Bromley	No pewter medals awarded	
1953	Seattle, WA				No pewter medals awarded	
1954	Berkeley, CA	Patsy Riedel; Roland Junso	Rose Morganroth; Bruce Hannah	Myrtle Girten; Philip Girten	No pewter medals awarded	
1955	Los Angeles, CA	Kathleen Heyler; Thomas Sherritt	Rose Mary Lyons; Charles Phillips	Rose Morganroth; Louis Spievak	No pewter medals awarded	
1956	Berkeley, CA	Sharon McKenzie; Bert Wright	Elda Stillwell; Ray Sato	No other competitors	No pewter medals awarded	
1957	Los Angeles, CA	Aileen Kahre; Charles Philips	Rose Morganroth; Louis Spievak	Myrtle Girten; Philip Girten	No pewter medals awarded	
1958	Seattle, WA	Lois Morganroth; Roland Junso	Rose Morganroth; Ray Soto	No other competitors	No pewter medals awarded	
1959	Los Angeles, CA	Margie Ackles; Charles Phillips	Jean Robinson; Richard Wayland	Yvonne Littlefield; Ray Sato	No pewter medals awarded	
1960	Squaw Valley, CA	Margie Ackles; Charles Phillips	Yvonne Littlefield; Roger Campbell	Jean Robinson; Richard Wayland	No pewter medals awarded	
1961	Los Angeles, CA	Dona Lee Carrier; Roger Campbell	Jan Jacobson; Marshall Campbell	No other competitors	No pewter medals awarded	
1962		Yvonne Littlefield; Peter Betts	Lorna Dyer; King Cole	Aileen Kahre; Howard G. Taylor	No pewter medals awarded	
1963	Berkeley, CA	Yvonne Littlefield; Peter Betts	Lorna Dyer; John Carrell	No other competitors	No pewter medals awarded	
1964	Burbank, CA	Lorna Dyer; John Carrell	Barbara McEvoy; Dennis Sveum	Darlene Nevel; Howie Harrold	No pewter medals awarded	
1965	No competition held				No pewter medals awarded	
1966	Culver City, CA	Alma Davenport; Roger Berry	Barbara McEvoy; John Hubschmitt	Kristine Myers; Michael Wayland	No pewter medals awarded	
1967	Berkeley, CA	Alma Davenport; Roger Berry	Darlene Nevel; John Hubschmitt	Kathleen Sweet; Claude Sweet	No pewter medals awarded	
1968	Beaverton, OR	Gaie Shoman; Roger Berry	Debbie Ganson; Rollie Arthur	Kristine Myers; Michael Wayland	No pewter medals awarded	
1969	Los Angeles, CA	Gaie Shoman; Roger Berry	Joan Bitterman; Brad Hislop	Debbie Ganson; Rollie Arthur	No pewter medals awarded	
1970	Berkeley, CA	Debbie Ganson; Brad Hislop	Joan Sherbloom; Tom Easton	Barbara McEvoy; Michael Wayland	No pewter medals awarded	
1971	No competition held				No pewter medals awarded	
1972	Berkeley, CA	Barbara McEvoy; Michael Wayland	Ginger Snyder; Robert Castle	Linda Stroh; Barry Stroh	No pewter medals awarded	
1973	Culver City, CA	Karen Raile; Curt Finley	Barbara McEvoy; Michael Wayland	Linda Stroh; Barry Stroh	No pewter medals awarded	
1974	Portland, OR	Michelle Ford; Glenn Patterson	Karen Raile; Curt Finley	Kathy Russell; Paul Steiner	No pewter medals awarded	
1975	San Diego, CA	Michelle Ford; Glenn Patterson	Debbie Ganson; Gerry Lane	Sara Hill; Paul Steiner	No pewter medals awarded	
1976	Berkeley, CA	Dee Oseroff; Craig Bond	Debbie Ganson; Gerry Lane	Cathy Marron; Hal Marron	No pewter medals awarded	
1977	Seattle, WA	Cathy Marron; Hal Marron	Deee Oseroff; Craig Bond	Cathy Marron; Hal Marron	No pewter medals awarded	
1978	Burbank, CA	Kim Krohn; Barry Hagan	Karen Mankowich; Douglas Mankowich	Deee Oseroff; Craig Bond	No pewter medals awarded	
1979	Santa Rosa, CA	Kim Krohn; Barry Hagan	Deee Oseroff; Craig Bond	Karen Mankowich; Douglas Mankowich	No pewter medals awarded	
1980	Great Falls, MT	Kim Krohn; Barry Hagan	Robi Shepard; Kelly Witt	Karen Robinson-Tiedemann; Peter Sasmore	No pewter medals awarded	
1981	Culver City, CA	Kim Krohn; Barry Hagan	Lisa Stillwell; Peter Sasmore	Holly Genoa; John Cole	No pewter medals awarded	
1982	Salt Lake City, UT	Kim Krohn; Barry Hagan	Susie Wynne; Joseph Druar	Karen Knieriem; Philip Piasecki	No pewter medals awarded	
1983	Tacoma, WA	Susie Wynne; Joseph Druar	Karen Knieriem; Philip Piasecki	Robi Shepard; Kelly Witt	No pewter medals awarded	
1984	Paramount, CA	Susie Wynne; Joseph Druar	Margaret Bodo; Rick Berg	Karen Knieriem; Leif Erickson	No pewter medals awarded	
1985	San Diego, CA	Susie Wynne; Joseph Druar	April Sargent; John D'Amelio	Karen Knieriem; Leif Erickson	No pewter medals awarded	
1986	Spokane, WA	April Sargent; John D'Amelio	Karen Knieriem; Leif Erickson	Jill Heiser; Michael Verlich	No pewter medals awarded	
1987	Phoenix, AZ	Susie Wynne; Joseph Druar	Karen Knieriem; Leif Erickson	Jill Heiser; Michael Verlich	Colette Huber; Ron Kravette	
1988	Stockton, CA	Karen Knieriem; Leif Erickson	Jeanne Miley; Michael Verlich	Heidi Hahn; Bill Aquilino	No other competitors	
1989	Lynnwood, WA	Susie Wynne; Joseph Druar	Jeanne Miley; Michael Verlich	Tracy Sniadach; Leif Erickson	Tiffany Veltre; Duane Greenleaf	
1990	San Diego, CA	Jeanne Miley; Michael Verlich	Ann-Morton Neale; Laurence Shaffer	Tiffany Veltre; Duane Greenleaf	Hilary Olney; John Millier	
1991	Bountiful, UT	Jeanne Miley; Michael Verlich	Beth Buhl; Neale Smull	Ann-Morton Neale; Laurence Shaffer	Mimi Wacholder; Collin Sullivan	
1992	Tacoma, WA	Mimi Wacholder; Collin Sullivan	Beth Buhl; Neale Smull	Dawn Goldstein; Troy Goldstein	Kimbra Baurer; Laurence Shaffer	
1993	Las Vegas, NV	Jennifer Nocito; Michael Verlich	Tamara Kuchiki; Neale Smull	Mimi Wacholder; Collin Vail Sullivan	Michelle Maler; Tony Darnell	
1994	Redwood City, CA	Tamara Kuchiki; Neale Smull	Tiffani Tucker; Collin Vail Sullivan	Elizabeth Buhl; Augustine DiBella	Sian Matthews; Yovanny Durango	
1995	Portland, OR	Elizabeth Buhl; Augustine DiBella	Tamara Kuchiki; Neale Smull	Cheryl Demkowski; Gregory Maddalone	Sian Matthews; Yovanny Durango	
1996	Burbank, CA	Kimberly Callahan; Robert Daw	Tamara Kuchiki; Neale Smull	Elizabeth Buhl; Augustine DiBella	Felita Yost Carr; Alexei Komarov	
1997	Bountiful, UT	Felita Yost Carr; Alexei Komarov	Dawn Ponte; Paul Frey	Beata Handra; Charles Sinek	No other competitors	
1998	Mountlake Terrace, WA	Elizabeth Buhl; Augustine DiBella	Beata Handra; Charles Sinek	Azumi Sagara; Jonathon Magalnick	Tami Tyler; Thomas Gaasbeck	
1999	Scottsdale, AZ	Beata Handra; Charles Sinek	Shannon Simon; Jason Simon	No other competitors		
2000	San Jose, CA	Beata Handra; Charles Sinek	Disa Steiber; Pattrick Connolly	No other competitors		
2001	No competition held					
2002	Burbank, CA	Kakani Young; Ikaika Young	Lia Nitake; Ian Ross-Frye	Laura Munana; Luke Munana	Cerise Henzes; Rio Foster	
2003	Salt Lake City, UT	Kimberly Navarro; Robert Schmalo	Eleanor Langhans; Ian Ross-Frye	No other competitors		
2004	No competition held					
2005	Escondido, CA	Lydia Manon; Ryan O'Meara	Alisa Allapach; Benjamin Westenberger	Stephanie Ellis; Ian Ross-Frye	Elizabeth Palmer; Ryland Stucke	
2006	Roseville, CA	Jamie Silverstein; Ryan O'Meara	Caitlin Mallory; Brent Holdburg	Megan McCullough; Joel Dear	Stephanie Ellis; Ian Ross-Frye	
2007	Mountlake Terrace, WA	Mimi Whetstone; Chris Obzansky	Caitlin Mallory; Brent Holdburg	Charlotte Maxwell; Nick Traxler	Emma Cyders; Ikaika Young	
2008	No competition held					
2009	Scottsdale, AZ	Lynn Kriengkrairut; Logan Giulietti-Schmitt	Trina Pratt; Chris Obzansky	Jessica Perino; William Avila	Emma Cyders; Ievgenii Krasniak	
2010	Jackson Hole, WY	Lynn Kriengkrairut; Logan Giulietti-Schmitt	Elizabeth Chan; Jason Deveikis	No other competitors		
2011	No competition held					
2012	Salt Lake City, UT	Emily Samuelson; Todd Gilles	Anastasia Olson; Jordan Cowan	Charlotte Lichtman; Dean Copely	Brittany Schmucker; Adam Munday	
2013	No competition held					
2014	Oakland, CA	Alissandra Aronow; Collin Brubaker	Madeline Heritage; Nathaniel Fast	Pauline Bynum; Jason Deveikis	No other competitors	
2015	Spokane, WA	Alissandra Aronow; Collin Brubaker	Tory Patsis; Nathaniel Fast	Ashlyn Gaughan; Cody Lithco	Pauline Bynum; Jason Deveikis	
2016	Burbank, CA	Karina Manta; Joseph Johnson	Alissandra Aronow; Collin Brubaker	Kseniya Ponomaryova; Oleg Altukhov	Tory Patsis; Nathaniel Fast	
2017- 2020	No competition held					
2021- 2022	No competition held due to the COVID-19 pandemic					
2023- 2026	No competition held					

== Junior medalists ==
=== Men's singles ===
Junior men's event medalists
Year	Location	Gold	Silver	Bronze	Pewter	Ref.
1936	Yosemite, CA				No pewter medals awarded	
1937	Seattle, WA	Lloyd Baxter	Joseph Jensen	Damian Bourque	No pewter medals awarded	
1938	Oakland, CA	Damian Bourque	LeRoy Tarp	Meryl Baxter	No pewter medals awarded	
1939	Los Angeles, CA	Murray Galbraith	Sheldon Galbraith	Meryl Baxter	No pewter medals awarded	
1940	Oakland, CA	Meryl Baxter	George Monnier	Bill Udell	No pewter medals awarded	
1941	Colorado Springs, CO	Jack Might	Bill Udell	Edward Bodell	No pewter medals awarded	
1942	Seattle, WA	James Lawrence	Charles Anderson	No other competitors	No pewter medals awarded	
1943	Berkeley, CA	Austin Holt	Fletcher Hoyt	Robert Turk	No pewter medals awarded	
1944	Berkeley, CA	William Blocker	Fletcher Hoyt	No other competitors	No pewter medals awarded	
1945	Seattle, WA	Peter Kennedy	Tommy Gilshannon	Edward Bodel	No pewter medals awarded	
1946	Los Angeles, CA	Herman Maricich	Ralymond Alperth	No other competitors	No pewter medals awarded	
1947	Colorado Springs, CO	Ronald Pugh	Carl Chamberlin	No other competitors	No pewter medals awarded	
1948	Seattle, WA				No pewter medals awarded	
1949	San Diego, CA				No pewter medals awarded	
1950	Berkeley, CA	Ronald Robertson	Richard Bromley	Joe Driano	No pewter medals awarded	
1951	Los Angeles, CA	Tommy Moore	Arthur Gelien	Noble Lee Rochester	No pewter medals awarded	
1952	Los Angeles, CA	Noble Lee Rochester	Charles Phillips	Art Jenkins	No pewter medals awarded	
1953	Seattle, WA	Don Mike Anthony	Robin Greiner	Loren Caccamise	No pewter medals awarded	
1954	Berkeley, CA	Loren Caccamise	Robert Lee Brewer	James Short	No pewter medals awarded	
1955	Los Angeles, CA	James Short	Bob Hubbard	Paul Sibley	No pewter medals awarded	
1956	Berkeley, CA	Bob Hubbard	Bill Hickox	Randy Phillips	No pewter medals awarded	
1957	Los Angeles, CA	Bill Hickox	James Murray	Harvey Balch	No pewter medals awarded	
1958	Seattle, WA	Harvey Balch	Richard Paice	Don Bartelson	No pewter medals awarded	
1959	Los Angeles, CA	Ronnie Frank	Donald Bartelson	Roy Wagelein	No pewter medals awarded	
1960	Squaw Valley, CA	Bob Madden	Donald Bartelson	Walter Hypes	No pewter medals awarded	
1961	Los Angeles, CA	King Cole	Roger Berry	Billy Chapel	No pewter medals awarded	
1962					No pewter medals awarded	
1963	Berkeley, CA	Johnny Moore	Robert Sable	Lance Shinkle	No pewter medals awarded	
1964	Burbank, CA	John Petkevich	Barry Munns	Iain Kite	No pewter medals awarded	
1965	Seattle, WA	Roger Bass	Atoy Wilson	Joe Lasby	No pewter medals awarded	
1966	Culver City, CA	Atoy Wilson	Kenneth Shelley	Paul Spruell	No pewter medals awarded	
1967	Berkeley, CA				No pewter medals awarded	
1968	Beaverton, OR				No pewter medals awarded	
1969	Los Angeles, CA				No pewter medals awarded	
1970	Berkeley, CA	Jimmy Demogines			No pewter medals awarded	
1971	Seattle, WA	Nathan Alden Jr.	Alex Rubio	Bill Schneider	No pewter medals awarded	
1972	Berkeley, CA	Terry Kubicka	John Carlow Jr.	Bill Schneider	No pewter medals awarded	
1973	Culver City, CA	John Carlow Jr.	Perry Jewell	Ken Newfield	No pewter medals awarded	
1974	Portland, OR	Randy Gardner	Perry Jewell	Ken Newfield	No pewter medals awarded	
1975	San Diego, CA	Perry Jewell	Hal Marron	Scott Carson	No pewter medals awarded	
1976	Berkeley, CA	Allen Schramm	Mark Cockerell	Robert Wagenhoffer	No pewter medals awarded	
1977	Seattle, WA	Robert Wagenhoffer			No pewter medals awarded	
1978	Burbank, CA	Brian Boitano	George Scolari	Richard Zander	No pewter medals awarded	
1979	Santa Rosa, CA	Tom Dickson	Jim White	Bobby Beauchamp	No pewter medals awarded	
1980	Great Falls, MT				No pewter medals awarded	
1981	Culver City, CA				No pewter medals awarded	
1982	Salt Lake City, UT				No pewter medals awarded	
1983	Tacoma, WA	Scott Kurttila	Scott Wendland	Craig Henderson	No pewter medals awarded	
1984	Paramount, CA	John Saitta	Scott Wendland	Rudy Galindo	No pewter medals awarded	
1985	San Diego, CA	Scott Kurttila	John Saitta	Jeff Cartensen	No pewter medals awarded	
1986	Spokane, WA	Patrick Brault	Craig Heath	Mark Alexander	No pewter medals awarded	
1987	Phoenix, AZ	Craig Heath	Patrick Brault	Alex Chang	Christopher Mitchell	
1988	Stockton, CA	Alex Chang	Christopher Mitchell	Scott Davis	Tim Dever	
1989	Lynnwood, WA	Scott Davis	Alex Chang	John Baldwin Jr.	Richard Alexander	
1990	San Diego, CA	Scott Davis	John Baldwin Jr.	Steven Smith	Richard Alexander	
1991	Bountiful, UT	John Baldwin Jr.	Steven Smith	Richard Alexander	Russ Scott	
1992	Tacoma, WA	John Bevan	John Baldwin Jr.	Chris Hendricks	Russ Scott	
1993	Las Vegas, NV	John Baldwin Jr.	Derek Stedingh	Trifun Zivanovic	Eddie Gornik	
1994	Redwood City, CA	Trifun Zivanovic	Eddie Gornik	Derek Stedingh	Michael Demetrius Orr	
1995	Portland, OR	Trifun Zivanovic	Don Baldwin	John Wagner	Eddie Gornik	
1996	Burbank, CA	Justin Dillon	Don Baldwin	Danny Clausen	Eddie Gornik	
1997	Bountiful, UT	Justin Dillon	Everett Weiss	Jonathan Keen	Robert Brathwaite	
1998	Mountlake Terrace, WA	Everett Weiss	John Wagner	Don Baldwin	Jonathan Keen	
1999	Scottsdale, AZ	Robert Brathwaite	Jordan Wilson	Fitzhugh Middleton	Sean Calvillo	
2000	San Jose, CA	David Glynn	Jordan Wilson	Michael Villarreal	Michael Sasaki	
2001	Anchorage, AK	Michael Villarreal	Dennis Phan	Michael Sasaki	Pierre Balian	
2002	Burbank, CA	Nicholas LaRoche	Dennis Phan	Jordan Wilson	Daniel Steffel	
2003	Salt Lake City, UT					
2004	Vancouver, WA					
2005	Escondido, CA	Douglas Razzano	Princeton Kwong	Michael Peters	Geoffry Varner	
2006	Roseville, CA	Daisuke Murakami	Princeton Kwong	Douglas Razzano	Peter Lindstrom	
2007	Mountlake Terrace, WA	Princeton Kwong	Douglas Razzano	Richard Dornbush	Andrew Gonzales	
2008	San Diego, CA	Max Aaron	Keegan Messing	Richard Dornbush	Andrew Gonzales	
2009	Scottsdale, AZ	Keegan Messing	Austin Kanallakan	Andrew Gonzales	David Wang	
2010	Jackson Hole, WY	Austin Kanallakan	Sean Rabbitt	Christopher Caluza	Grisha Fournier	
2011	Culver City, CA	Philip Warren	David Wang	Shotaro Omori	Joey Millet	
2012	Salt Lake City, UT	Nathan Chen	Philip Warren	David Wang	Jay Yostano	
2013	Provo, UT	Vincent Zhou	Nathan Chen	Nix Phengsy	Shotaro Omori	
2014	Oakland, CA	Nix Phengsy	Spencer Howe	Kevin Shum	Evan Bender	
2015	Spokane, WA	Kevin Shum	Daniel Kulenkamp	Paolo Borromeo	Spencer Howe	
2016	Burbank, CA	Sean Conolon	Justin Ly	Paolo Borromeo	Camden Pulkinen	
2017	Salt Lake City, UT	Eric Sjoberg	Matthew Graham	Kendrick Weston	Daniil Shamis	
2018	Spokane, WA	Paul Yeung	Patrick Frohling	Dinh Tran	Kendrick Weston	
2019	Salt Lake City, UT	Dinh Tran	Eric Sjoberg	Max Lake	Joonsoo Kim	
2020	Wenatchee, WA	Eric Sjoberg	Liam Kapeikis	Goku Endo	Seth Kurogi	
2021	No competition held due to the COVID-19 pandemic					
2022	No competition held due to the COVID-19 pandemic					
2023	San Francisco, CA	Michael Xie	Daniil Murzin	Sergei Evseev	Allan Fisher	
2024	Tacoma, WA	Nicholas Brooks	Sergei Evseev	Vaclav Vasquez	Jon Maravilla	
2025	Ogden, UT	Vaclav Vasquez	Ryan William Azadpour	Arsen Meghavoryan	Sergei Evseev	
2026	Henderson, NV	Nicholas Brooks	Ryan William Azadpour	Kirk Hagueto	Ryedin Rudedenman	

=== Women's singles ===
Junior women's event medalists
Jen	Location	Gold	Silver	Bronze	Pewter	Ref.
1936	Yosemite, CA				No pewter medals awarded	
1937	Seattle, WA	Suzanne Uksila	Edna Holmes	Myrtle Girten	No pewter medals awarded	
1938	Oakland, CA	Britta Lundequist	Patricia Merifield	Betty Lee Bennett	No pewter medals awarded	
1939	Los Angeles, CA	Mary Ruth Barnes	Jean Sturgeon		No pewter medals awarded	
1940	Oakland, CA	Donna Atwood	Marcella May	June Ramussen	No pewter medals awarded	
1941	Colorado Springs, CO	Patricia Vaeth	Pattie Sonnekson	Dory-Ann Killian	No pewter medals awarded	
1942	Seattle, WA	Margaret Grant	Madelon Olson	Joan Yocum	No pewter medals awarded	
1943	Berkeley, CA	Margaret Field	Louella Ettinger	Barbara deJulio	No pewter medals awarded	
1944	Berkeley, CA	Peggy Hoyt	Barbara deJulio	Jeanine Voigt	No pewter medals awarded	
1945	Seattle, WA	Glee Patten	Letha Lou Linn	Gloria Suess	No pewter medals awarded	
1946	Los Angeles, CA	Gloria Peterson	Eleanor Levorsen	Joan Zamboni	No pewter medals awarded	
1947	Colorado Springs, CO	Marjorie Havenick	Eleanor Levorsen	Zella May Harrington	No pewter medals awarded	
1948	Seattle, WA				No pewter medals awarded	
1949	San Diego, CA				No pewter medals awarded	
1950	Berkeley, CA	Patricia Quick	Patsy Hamm	Catherine Machado	No pewter medals awarded	
1951	Los Angeles, CA	Georgiana Sutton	Catherine Machado	Kim Carson	No pewter medals awarded	
1952	Los Angeles, CA	Sherry Dorsey	Patsy Riedel	Kim Carson	No pewter medals awarded	
1953	Seattle, WA	Dee Dee Wayland	Patricia Kilgore	Janice Marie Crappa	No pewter medals awarded	
1954	Berkeley, CA	Patricia Kilgore	Gloria Linek	Joan Keller	No pewter medals awarded	
1955	Los Angeles, CA	LaRee Coyle	Linda Ann Epperson	Brenda Ferguson	No pewter medals awarded	
1956	Berkeley, CA	Barbara Roles	Linda Ann Epperson	Marlene Gaynor	No pewter medals awarded	
1957	Los Angeles, CA	Linda Ann Epperson	Sandy Carson	Laurene Moore	No pewter medals awarded	
1958	Seattle, WA	Sharon Constable	Rhode Michelson	Linda Galbraith	No pewter medals awarded	
1959	Los Angeles, CA	Wanda Guntert	Michele Monnier	Ellen Kullmann	No pewter medals awarded	
1960	Squaw Valley, CA	Eloise Morgan	Ellen Kullmann	Neysa Higgins	No pewter medals awarded	
1961	Los Angeles, CA	Sondra Lee Holmes	Anita Entrikin	Neysa Higgins	No pewter medals awarded	
1962					No pewter medals awarded	
1963	Berkeley, CA	Lynn Yonekura	Jean Kondo	Susan Berens	No pewter medals awarded	
1964	Burbank, CA	Susan Berens	Julie Holmes	Charlene McLaren	No pewter medals awarded	
1965	Seattle, WA	Julie Lynn Holmes	Roseanne Shelley Lee	Christine Kjarsgaard	No pewter medals awarded	
1966	Culver City, CA	Dawn Glab	Christy Ito	Sharon Davisson	No pewter medals awarded	
1967	Berkeley, CA				No pewter medals awarded	
1968	Beaverton, OR				No pewter medals awarded	
1969	Los Angeles, CA				No pewter medals awarded	
1970	Berkeley, CA				No pewter medals awarded	
1971	Seattle, WA	Donna Alpert	Patricia Shelley	Donna Arquilla	No pewter medals awarded	
1972	Berkeley, CA	Wendy Burge	Laurie Brandel	Donna Arquilla	No pewter medals awarded	
1973	Culver City, CA	Laurie Brandel	Lina Fratianne	Kim McIsaac	No pewter medals awarded	
1974	Portland, OR	Barbara Smith	Teresa Foy	Kim McIsaac	No pewter medals awarded	
1975	San Diego, CA	Jeanne Chapman	Tammy Gambill	Lisa Allen	No pewter medals awarded	
1976	Berkeley, CA	Clarissa Perrella	Sally Anderson	Carrie Rugh	No pewter medals awarded	
1977	Seattle, WA	Lori Benton	Vicki Heasley	Staci Loop	No pewter medals awarded	
1978	Burbank, CA	Jill Sawyer	Cindy Moyers	Lynn Smith	No pewter medals awarded	
1979	Santa Rosa, CA	Lynn Smith	Vicki Heasley	Joyce Newell	No pewter medals awarded	
1980	Great Falls, MT				No pewter medals awarded	
1981	Culver City, CA				No pewter medals awarded	
1982	Salt Lake City, UT				No pewter medals awarded	
1983	Tacoma, WA	Yvonne Gomez	Kathryn Adams	Sara MacInnes	No pewter medals awarded	
1984	Paramount, CA	D're Anderson	Tonya Harding	Andrea Key	No pewter medals awarded	
1985	San Diego, CA	Sharon Barker	Holly Cook	Kristin Kriwanek	No pewter medals awarded	
1986	Spokane, WA	Rory Flack	Cindy Bortz	Dena Galech	No pewter medals awarded	
1987	Phoenix, AZ	Jeri Campbell	Dena Galech	Karen Terry	Kate Hollister	
1988	Stockton, CA	Dena Galech	Tisha Walker	Jennifer Flock	Jessica Mills	
1989	Lynnwood, WA	Jessica Mills	Tisha Walker	Natasha Kuchiki	Berkeley Villard	
1990	San Diego, CA	Natasha Kuchiki	Jennifer Verili	Jennifer Davidson	Casey Link	
1991	Bountiful, UT	Joanna Ng	Jennifer Verili	Keri-Anne Thomas	Tristen Vega	
1992	Tacoma, WA	Dawn Finley	Caroline Song	Michelle Kwan	Keri-Anne Thomas	
1993	Las Vegas, NV	Melissa Nelson	Lisa Talbot	Laura Lipetsky	Kristy Venasky	
1994	Redwood City, CA	Amber Corwin	Angela Nikodinov	Kristy Venasky	Serena Phillips	
1995	Portland, OR	Sydne Vogel	Angela Nikodinov	Dena Darland	Cohen Duncan	
1996	Burbank, CA	Cohen Duncan	Tiffany Chan	Rhea Sy	Serena Phillips	
1997	Bountiful, UT	Elizabeth O'Donnell	Cohen Duncan	J.J. Matthews	Mika Kadono	
1998	Mountlake Terrace, WA	Naomi Nari Nam	Susan Ng	Elizabeth O'Donnell	Kimberly Kilby	
1999	Scottsdale, AZ	Sasha Cohen	Tiffany Stiegler	Emily Pitchon	Ye Bin Mok	
2000	San Jose, CA	Jordan Blesa	Kim Ryan	Beatrisa Liang	Felicia Beck	
2001	Anchorage, AK	Kim Ryan	Joan Cristobal	Kailee Watson	Andrey Rose Chua	
2002	Burbank, CA	Felicia Beck	Aanya Reiten	Jennifer Don	Samira Banna	
2003	Salt Lake City, UT					
2004	Vancouver, WA					
2005	Escondido, CA	Sandra Jean Rucker	Tenile Victorsen	Margaret Wang	Crystal Shum	
2006	Roseville, CA	Ashley Wagner	Tenile Victorsen	Caroline Zhang	Becky Hughes	
2007	Mountlake Terrace, WA	Mirai Nagasu	Victoria Rackohn	Chrissy Hughes	Kelcie Lee	
2008	San Diego, CA	Ellie Kawamura	Carolyn-Ann Alba	Amanda Dobbs	Victoria Rackohn	
2009	Scottsdale, AZ	Ellie Kawamura	Carolyn-Ann Alba	Vanessa Lam	Keli Zhou	
2010	Jackson Hole, WY	Angela Wang	Vanessa Lam	Lindsay Davis	Katlynn McNab	
2011	Culver City, CA	Courtney Hicks	Katarina Kulgeyko	Polina Edmunds	Mary Beth Marley	
2012	Salt Lake City, UT	Katarina Kulgeyko	Gwendolyn Prescott	Polina Edmunds	Camille Davis	
2013	Provo, UT	Polina Edmunds	Karen Chen	Dyllan McIntee	Amanda Gelb	
2014	Oakland, CA	Amy Lin	Tyler Pierce	Elizabeth Nguyen	Xylina Rusit	
2015	Spokane, WA	Amy Lin	Hina Ueno	Megan Wessenberg	Sarah Feng	
2016	Burbank, CA	Akari Nakahara	Alice Yang	Anna Grace Davidson	Vanna Giang	
2017	Salt Lake City, UT	Kaitlyn Nguyen	Starr Andrews	Nina Ouellette	Elizaveta Kulik	
2018	Spokane, WA	Alysa Liu	Akari Nakahara	Lily Sun	Emma Coppess	
2019	Salt Lake City, UT	Emilia Murdock	Noelle Rosa	Amie Miyagi	Caitlin Ha	
2020	Wenatchee, WA	Ellen Slavicek	Mia Kalin	Noelle Rosa	Kate Wang	
2021	No competition held due to the COVID-19 pandemic					
2022	No competition held due to the COVID-19 pandemic					
2023	San Francisco, CA	Soho Lee	Sherry Zhang	Elyce Lin-Gracey	Hannah Herrera	
2024	Tacoma, WA	Sherry Zhang	Annika Chao	Cleo Park	Keira Hilbelink	
2025	Ogden, UT	Cleo Park	Annika Chao	Teryn Kim	Alayna Coats	
2026	Henderson, NV	Annika Chao	Alayna Coats	Hannah Kim	Cleo Park	

=== Pairs ===
Junior pairs event medalists
Year	Location	Gold	Silver	Bronze	Pewter	Ref.
1936	Yosemite, CA				No pewter medals awarded	
1937	Seattle, WA	Pat Merrifield; Damian Bourque	Dorothy Beymer; Ralph Beymer	Gladys McPherron; Joseph Jensen	No pewter medals awarded	
1938	Oakland, CA	Dorothy Lee Bennett; John Kinney	Dorothy Beymer; Ralph Beymer	Dorothy Beeskow; Arthur Rude	No pewter medals awarded	
1939	Los Angeles, CA	Betty Labree; William Wade	Dorothy Beeskow; Arthur Rude	Dorothy Beymer; Ralph Beymer	No pewter medals awarded	
1940	Oakland, CA	Patty Vaeth; Jack Mite	Shirley Davies; Claude Gilker	June Ramussen; Bill Udell	No pewter medals awarded	
1941	Colorado Springs, CO	June Ramussen; Bill Udell	Karol Kennedy; Peter Kennedy	Yvonne Broders; Jack Kline	No pewter medals awarded	
1942	Seattle, WA	Donna Jean Pospisil; Jean Pierre Brunet	Mary Burke; Jack Burke	No other competitors	No pewter medals awarded	
1943	Berkeley, CA	Karol Kennedy; Peter Kennedy	Jeanine Voight; Bill Blocker	Beverly Licht; Douglas Tyler	No pewter medals awarded	
1944	Berkeley, CA	Edith Hale; Vern Hale	Catherine McDonald; Tom Gilshannon	Ann Dillon; Glen Seaburg	No pewter medals awarded	
1945	Seattle, WA	Lois Secreto; Jimmy Grogan	Catherine McDonald; Tom Gilshannon	Jerry Straub; Glenn Michaels	No pewter medals awarded	
1946	Los Angeles, CA	Jeanine Voigt; Calvin Cook	Eleanor Tripp; Bob Knoll	Margot Wilcox; Robert Simmonds	No pewter medals awarded	
1947	Colorado Springs, CO	Gloria Jeske; Edward Worth	Marcia Hutchinson; Fred Conrad	No other competitors	No pewter medals awarded	
1948	Seattle, WA				No pewter medals awarded	
1949	San Diego, CA				No pewter medals awarded	
1950	Berkeley, CA	Sharon Choate; Richard Bromley	Carole Ormaca; Robin Greiner	No other competitors	No pewter medals awarded	
1951	Los Angeles, CA	Gloria Rowe; Robert Leip	Carole Ormaca; Robin Greiner	Janet Brown; Charles Coulon	No pewter medals awarded	
1952	Los Angeles, CA	Dawn May; David Hertz	Agnes Tyson; Harry Craycroft	Margit MacRae; Harold Cross	No pewter medals awarded	
1953	Seattle, WA	Karen Howland; Bill Thomas	Nancy Copeland; Roy Cofer	Bevin Dahlberg; John Jarmon	No pewter medals awarded	
1954	Berkeley, CA	Joan Zamboni; Charles Coulon	Vickie Grivé; Francis Sakakibara	Bevin Dahlberg; John Jarmon	No pewter medals awarded	
1955	Los Angeles, CA	Joan Schenke; John Jarmon	Sharon Constable; John Hertz	Eleanor Banneck; Jack Curtis	No pewter medals awarded	
1956	Berkeley, CA	Sharon Constable; John Hertz	Ila Ray Hadley; Ray Hadley	Judianne Fotheringill; Jerry Fotheringill	No pewter medals awarded	
1957	Los Angeles, CA	Ila Ray Hadley; Ray Hadley	Mary Lou Raymond; Jack Nankervis	Marianne Thompson; Alfred O'Connor	No pewter medals awarded	
1958	Seattle, WA	Judianne Fotheringill; Jerry Fotheringill	Laurie Hickox; Bill Hickox	Kathy Lawson; Paul Morgan	No pewter medals awarded	
1959	Los Angeles, CA	Laurie Hickox; Bill Hickox	Mary McGrath; Jeffrey Flowers	Cynthia Kauffman; Ronald Kauffman	No pewter medals awarded	
1960	Squaw Valley, CA	Mary McGrath; Jeffrey Flowers	Cynthia Kauffman; Ronald Kauffman	Susan Berenes; Boby Sable	No pewter medals awarded	
1961	Los Angeles, CA	Cynthia Kauffman; Ronald Kauffman	Susan Berenes; Boby Sable	Debby Pastrone; Jerry Wechsler	No pewter medals awarded	
1962					No pewter medals awarded	
1963	Berkeley, CA	Christine Simon; Elwin Kelsey	Kristin Fortune; Dennis Sveum	JoJo Starbuck; Kenneth Shelley	No pewter medals awarded	
1964	Burbank, CA	Page Paulsen; Larry Dusich	Sandi Sweitzer; Jerry Entwistle	Georgia Truffini; Eugene Heffron	No pewter medals awarded	
1965	Seattle, WA	JoJo Starbuck; Kenneth Shelley	Jill Miller; Dennis Gehringer	Barbara Heagy; Jerry Emmons	No pewter medals awarded	
1966	Culver City, CA	Barbara Ray; Sam Singer Jr.	Jill Ritchie; Ralph Meredith	Jill Miller; Dennis Gehringer	No pewter medals awarded	
1967	Berkeley, CA				No pewter medals awarded	
1968	Beaverton, OR				No pewter medals awarded	
1969	Los Angeles, CA				No pewter medals awarded	
1970	Berkeley, CA				No pewter medals awarded	
1971	Seattle, WA	Cynthia Van Valkenburgh; James Hulick	Michelle McCladdie; Richard Ewell	Georgia Truffini; Bill McPike	No pewter medals awarded	
1972	Berkeley, CA	Georgia Truffini; Bill McPike	Michelle McCladdie; Richard Ewell	Jodie Martin; Robert Berry	No pewter medals awarded	
1973	Culver City, CA	Tai Babilonia; Randy Gardner	Erika Susman; Thomas Huff	Vickie Carr; Paul Tassone	No pewter medals awarded	
1974	Portland, OR	Rebecca Loghry; Mike Chapin	Tracy Prussack; Scott Prussack	Lisa Carey; Douglas Varvais	No pewter medals awarded	
1975	San Diego, CA	Lyndy Marron; Hal Marron	Lori Mills; David Kirby	Tracy Prussack; Scott Prussack	No pewter medals awarded	
1976	Berkeley, CA	Danielle Porter; John Maddison	Dana Resiman; Edward Resiman	No other competitors	No pewter medals awarded	
1977	Seattle, WA	Danielle Porter; David Hicks	Vicki Heasley; Robert Wagenhoffer	Maria DiDomenico; Larry Schrier	No pewter medals awarded	
1978	Burbank, CA	Maria DiDomenico; Larry Schrier	Beth Flora; Ken Flora	Michelle Dornan; Alan Wardin	No pewter medals awarded	
1979	Santa Rosa, CA	Beth Flora; Ken Flora	Danielle Porter; Burt Lancon	Cara Gill; Craig Gill	No pewter medals awarded	
1980	Great Falls, MT				No pewter medals awarded	
1981	Culver City, CA				No pewter medals awarded	
1982	Salt Lake City, UT				No pewter medals awarded	
1983	Tacoma, WA	Loreen Koshi; Doug Williams	Kellee Murchison; David McGovern	Susan Steiner; Stephen Kennedy	No pewter medals awarded	
1984	Paramount, CA	Susan Steiner; Stephen Kennedy	Lynn Lindborg; Bob Pellaton	Tammy Purcell; Jeff Smith	No pewter medals awarded	
1985	San Diego, CA	Lori Blasko; Todd Sand	Bridgit Drenser; David McGovern	Ashley Stevenson; Bob Pellaton	No pewter medals awarded	
1986	Spokane, WA	Ashley Stevenson; Scott Wendland	Laurie Snyder; David McGovern	Christina Kopp; Rick Scarry	No pewter medals awarded	
1987	Phoenix, AZ	Kellie Lynn Creel; David McGovern	Lara Dunlap; John Denton	Christina Kopp; Rick Scarry	Natasha Kuchiki; Richard Alexander	
1988	Stockton, CA	Natasha Kuchiki; Richard Alexander	Kenna Bailey; John Denton	Dawn Piepenbrink; Tim Denver	Dawn Goldstein; Troy Goldstein	
1989	Lynnwood, WA	Natasha Kuchiki; Richard Alexander	Dawn Piepenbrink; Tim Denver	Dawn Goldstein; Troy Goldstein	Paula Losinger; Ken Benson	
1990	San Diego, CA	Tristen Vega; Richard Alexander	Dawn Piepenbrink; Nick Castaneda	Nicole Sciarrotta; Gregory Sciarrotta Jr.	Brandee Marvin; Christopher Beck	
1991	Bountiful, UT	Kristy Bingham; Carmine Marinari	Nicole Sciarrotta; Gregory Sciarrotta Jr.	Tristan Colell; John Baldwin Jr.	Dawn Piepenbrink; Nick Castaneda	
1992	Tacoma, WA	Dawn Piepenbrink; Nick Castaneda	Erin Covington; Brandon Powell	Jacki Davison; Russ Scott	Deirdre McMahon; Ross McMahon	
1993	Las Vegas, NV	Stephanie Stiegler; Lance Travis	Liberte' Eames Sheldon; Russ Scott	Anne Ramos; Benjamin Oberman	Akemi Kawaguchi; Ronald Brilliant	
1994	Redwood City, CA	Nicole Perry; David Delago	Anne Ramos; Benjamin Oberman	Erin Covington; Brandon Powell	Akemi Kawaguchi; Ronald Brilliant	
1995	Portland, OR	Natalie Vlandis; Jered Guzman	Whitney Gaynor; David Delago	Jacki Davison; J. Paul Binnebose	Kelly Peterman; Matthew Stuart	
1996	Burbank, CA	Naomi Grabow; Benjamin Oberman	Tiffany Stiegler; Johnnie Stiegler	Whitney Gaynor; David Delago	Kelly Peterman; Matthew Stuart	
1997	Bountiful, UT	Tiffany Stiegler; Johnnie Stiegler	Rebecca Erb; Joel Vinson	Whitney Gaynor; David Delago	Alexis Nolte; John Gerth	
1998	Mountlake Terrace, WA	Whitney Gaynor; David Delago	Darby Gaynor; Robert Van Uitert	Jessica Miller; Kevin Garrett	No other competitors	
1999	Scottsdale, AZ	Sima Ganaba; Amir Ganaba	Lindsay Rogeness; Brian Rogeness	Jessica Waldstein; Devin Patrick	Erin Rex; John Wagner	
2000	San Jose, CA	Sima Ganaba; Amir Ganaba	Lindsay Rogeness; Brian Rogeness	Brooke Kayland; Everett Weiss	Kristen Treni; Robert Schupp	
2001	Anchorage, AK	Christie Baca; Scott Smith	Brooke Kayland; Yevgeniy Shvetsov	No other competitors		
2002	Burbank, CA	Christie Baca; Scott Smith	Janice Mayne; Josh Martin	Nicole Hartunian; Kirk Forbes	Jacqueline Matson; Johnnie Bevan	
2003	Salt Lake City, UT					
2004	Vancouver, WA					
2005	Escondido, CA	Jenna Yount; Grant Marron	Lindsey Seitz; Andy Seitz	Keauna McLaughlin; Ethan Burgess	Eden Delphey; Cole Davis	
2006	Roseville, CA	Rhea Sy; Cole Davis	Katie Boxwell; Danny Curzon	Arielle Trujillo; Grant Marron	Lindsey Seitz; R.J. Westfall	
2007	Mountlake Terrace, WA	Bianca Butler; Joseph Jacobsen	Chelsi Guillen; Danny Curzon	Ashlee Brown; Nathan Miller	Claire Davis; Brendyn Hatfield	
2008	San Diego, CA	Chelsi Guillen; Danny Curzon	Megan Gueli; Grant Marron	Lisa Moore; Justin Gaumond	Arielle Trujillo; Daniyel Cohen	
2009	Scottsdale, AZ	Megan Gueli; Grant Marron	Emily Glassberg; Gabe Woodruff	Molly Aaron; Daniyel Cohen	Kloe Bautista; Galvani Hopson	
2010	Jackson Hole, WY	Brynn Carman; AJ Reiss	Brittany Chase; Grant Marron	No other competitors		
2011	Culver City, CA	Mandy Garza; Brandon Frazier	Jessica Calalang; Zack Sidhu	Brynn Carman; AJ Reiss	Christina Guterres; Justin Schumann	
2012	Salt Lake City, UT	Jessica Pfund; AJ Reiss	Anna Pearce; Craig Norris	No other competitors		
2013	Provo, UT	Jessica Calalang; Zack Sidhu	Chelsea Liu; Devin Perini	Jessica Pfund; AJ Reiss	Caitlin Fields; Jason Pacini	
2014	Oakland, CA	AnnaMarie Pearce; Jason Pacini	Elise Middleton; Anthony Evans	No other competitors		
2015	No competition held					
2016	Burbank, CA	Ai Setoyama; David-Alexandre Paradis	Megan Griffin; Andrew Civiello	Jessica Lee; Brandon Kozlowski	No other competitors	
2017	Salt Lake City, UT	Alexandria Yao; Austin Hale	Emma Coppess; Robert Hennings	Vanessa Chen; Eric Hartley	Isabella Gamez; Griffin Schwab	
2018	Spokane, WA	Sarah Feng; TJ Nyman	Ainsley Peterson; Griffin Schwab	Meiryla Findley; Matthew Rounis	Sapphire Jaeckel; Matthew Scoralle	
2019- 2020	No competition held					
2021	No competition held due to the COVID-19 pandemic					
2022	No competition held due to the COVID-19 pandemic					
2023	No competition held					
2024	Tacoma, WA	Sydney Cooke; Matthew Kennedy	Audrey Park; Carter Griffin	Adele Zheng; Andy Deng	Saya Carpenter; Jon Maravilla	
2025- 2026	No competition held					

=== Ice Dance ===
Junior ice dance event medalists
Year	Location	Gold	Silver	Bronze	Pewter	Ref.
1943	Berkeley, CA	Jeanine Voight; Bill Blocker	Marilyn Grace; William Hoyt	Peggy Egan; Richard Burgess	No pewter medals awarded	
1944	Berkeley, CA	Marilyn Grace; William Hoyt	Edith Hale; Vern Hale	Bernice Hocking; Thomas Hocking	No pewter medals awarded	
1945	Seattle, WA	Karol Kennedy; Peter Kennedy	Edith Hale; Vern Hale	Patty Ruby; Glenn Miochaels	No pewter medals awarded	
1946	Los Angeles, CA	Camilla Cliff; Sidney Moore	Carmel Waterbury; Edward Bodel	Marilyn Grace; William Hoyt	No pewter medals awarded	
1947	Colorado Springs, CO	Vera Logstrup; E Ray Hanna	Carolyn Welch; Charles Brinkman	Jo Anna Kelley; Ronald Junso	No pewter medals awarded	
1948	Seattle, WA				No pewter medals awarded	
1949	San Diego, CA				No pewter medals awarded	
1950	Berkeley, CA	Kathleen Heyler; Robert Miller	Cara-Lee Conti; Erik Bruun	Sharon Choate; Richard Bromley	No pewter medals awarded	
1951	Los Angeles, CA	JoAnn Bolin; Robert Leip	Janet Brown; Charles Coulon	Eleanor Banneck; Morgan Rodney	No pewter medals awarded	
1952	Los Angeles, CA	Kristina Hunting; Thomas Sherritt	Eleanor Banneck; Charles Coulon	Barbara Elliott; Louis Spievak	No pewter medals awarded	
1953	Seattle, WA	Rose Mary Lyons; Joseph Nowach	Jeanne Landresse; Cliff Paige	Virginia Pearson; Louis Spievak	No pewter medals awarded	
1954	Berkeley, CA	Joan Zamboni; Charles Coulon	Barbara Stein; Ray Sato	Elda Stillwell; Bert Wright	No pewter medals awarded	
1955	Los Angeles, CA	Jacquelinee Holm; Bert Wright	Barbara Stein; Ray Sato	Sharon McKenzie; Howie Harrold	No pewter medals awarded	
1956	Berkeley, CA	Margie Ackles; Howie Harrold	Barbara Roles; James Short	Aileen Kahre; Chuck Phillips	No pewter medals awarded	
1957	Los Angeles, CA	Eleanor Curtis; Jack Curtis	Barbara Roles; James Short	Patricia Major; Robert Dineen	No pewter medals awarded	
1958	Seattle, WA	Barbara Ann Roles; James Short	Shirley Kanoff; Charles Kanoff	Karen Howland; O. S. Jones	No pewter medals awarded	
1959	Los Angeles, CA	Diane Sherbloom; Roger Campbell	Sandra Richardson; Raymond Chenson	Shirley Kanoff; Charles Kanoff	No pewter medals awarded	
1960	Squaw Valley, CA	Ila Ray Hadley; Ray Hadley	Hope Cuny; Michael Wayland	Georgia Taylor; Howard Taylor	No pewter medals awarded	
1961	Los Angeles, CA	Linda Anderson; King Cole	Georgia Taylor; Howard Taylor	Margaret Hosford; Ben Wade	No pewter medals awarded	
1962					No pewter medals awarded	
1963	Berkeley, CA	Barbara McEvoy; Dennis Sveum	Patricia Sandefur; Roger Berry	Kathy Drelen; Roy Wagelein	No pewter medals awarded	
1964	Burbank, CA	Kristin Fortune; Claude Sweet	Kathy Flaherty; Roger Berry	Ellen Grande; Roy Wagelein	No pewter medals awarded	
1965	Seattle, WA	Kathy Flaherty; Roger Berry	Joan Sherbloom; Dave Turner	Joan Brosten; Preston Ervin	No pewter medals awarded	
1966	Culver City, CA	Leni Martin; Les Martin	Ellen Grande; Michael Mynatt	Gay Fendler; Preston Ervin	No pewter medals awarded	
1967	Berkeley, CA				No pewter medals awarded	
1968	Beaverton, OR				No pewter medals awarded	
1969	Los Angeles, CA				No pewter medals awarded	
1970	Berkeley, CA				No pewter medals awarded	
1971	Seattle, WA	Shareen Finley; Curt Finley	Karen Warloe; Richard Kolodziej	Sara Hill; Roger Fortin	No pewter medals awarded	
1972	Berkeley, CA	Michelle Ford; Glenn Parriott	Sara Hill; Roger Fortin	Mitzi Robinson; Richard Kolodziej	No pewter medals awarded	
1973	Culver City, CA	Gaili Heitert; Stephen Heitert	Vicki Scherurn; Roger Fortin	Colleen Clark; Jean Rene Basle	No pewter medals awarded	
1974	Portland, OR	Heidi Broback; Jean Rene Basle	Jo Ann Schneider; Richard Griffin	Vicki Scherurn; Roger Fortin	No pewter medals awarded	
1975	San Diego, CA	Jo Ann Schneider; Richard Griffin	Sharon Parker; Mickey McCann	Cathy Marron; Hal Marron	No pewter medals awarded	
1976	Berkeley, CA				No pewter medals awarded	
1977	Seattle, WA	Karen Berson; Gary Forman			No pewter medals awarded	
1978	Burbank, CA	Judy Blumberg; Robert Engler	Lisa Stillwell; Robert Landford	Robi Shepard; Kelly Witt	No pewter medals awarded	
1979	Santa Rosa, CA	Robi Shepard; Kelly Witt	Susan De Rosa; Michael McIntyre	Deanna Stone; Randy Branca	No pewter medals awarded	
1980	Great Falls, MT				No pewter medals awarded	
1981	Culver City, CA				No pewter medals awarded	
1982	Salt Lake City, UT				No pewter medals awarded	
1983	Tacoma, WA	Dorothy Rodek; Robert Nardozza	Jessica Campbell; Glen Cummings	Colette Huber; Bob Tiernan	No pewter medals awarded	
1984	Paramount, CA	Dorothy Rodek; Robert Nardozza	Jill Heiser; Michael Verlich	Colleen Boman; Doug Murray	No pewter medals awarded	
1985	San Diego, CA	Jill Heiser; Michael Verlich	Colleen Boman; Doug Murray	Colette Huber; Ron Kravette	No pewter medals awarded	
1986	Spokane, WA	Colette Huber; Ron Kravette	Monique Barela; Jim Sun	K.C. Watkins; Duane Greenleaf	No pewter medals awarded	
1987	Phoenix, AZ	Tiffany Veltre; Duane Greenleaf	Heidi Hahn; William F. Aquilino Jr.	Kara Berger; Jay Barton	Kristina Nelson; Stephen Laumann	
1988	Stockton, CA	Tiffany Veltre; Duane Greenleaf	Kara Berger; Jay Barton	Dana Schneider; Stephen Laumann	Wendy Mirsky; Peter Mirsky	
1989	Lynnwood, WA	Kara Berger; Jay Barton	Ann Morton Neale; Laurence Shaffer	Elisa Marie Curtis; Neale Smull	Dana Schneider; Stephen Laumann	
1990	San Diego, CA	Beth Buhl; Neale Smull	Dana Schneider; Robert Davis	Jennifer Luckhurst; Collin Vail Sullivan	Michelle Maler; Tony Darnell	
1991	Bountiful, UT	Michelle Maler; Tony Darnell	Tiffani Tucker; Frank Singley	Jennifer Luckhurst; Hayes-Alan Knorr	Christine Fowler; Garrett Swasey	
1992	Tacoma, WA	Rachel Lane; Tony Darnell	Tiffani Tucker; Frank Singley	Michelle Maler; Hayes-Allen Knorr	Daniela Lopez; Andres Lopez	
1993	Las Vegas, NV	Tiffani Tucker; Frank Singley	Debbie Koegel; Hayes-Allen Knorr	Jayna Cronin; Jonathan Nichols	Erin McCabe; Christopher Rossiter	
1994	Redwood City, CA	Tami Tyler; Stith Letsinger	Kristina Feliciano; Alex Jacoby	Darlin Baker; D.J. Gray	Kate Black; Hayes-Allen Knorr	
1995	Portland, OR	Kristina Feliciano; Alex Jacoby	Azumi Sagara; Jonathan Magalnick	Stephanie Crawford; D.J. Gray	Celeste Treadwell; Shawn Jellse	
1996	Burbank, CA	Azumi Sagara; Jonathan Magalnick	Kari Downey; Raphael Kelling	Susanna Stapleford; Vincent Van Vliet	Kristen Fraser; Peter Kongkasem	
1997	Bountiful, UT	Crystal Beckerdite; Raphael Kelling	Tiffany Hyden; Jonathan Magalnick	Mollie Klurfeld; Martin Sivorinovsky	Alyssa Hicks; Edmund Hollis	
1998	Mountlake Terrace, WA	Shannon Simon; Jason Simon	Kimberly Navarro; Nicholas Hart	Anna Berry; Christopher Hayes	Alyssa Hicks; Ty Cockrum	
1999	Scottsdale, AZ	Anna Berry; Christopher Hayes	Disa Steiber; Patrick Connolly	Wendy Mangiagli; Andre LeBlanc	Alyssa Hicks; Ty Cockrum	
2000	San Jose, CA	Lia Nitake; Ryan Shea O'Meara	Kakani Young; Ikaika Young	Wendy Mangiagli; Joshua Abrahams	Kendra Goodwin; Tyrrell Cockrum	
2001	Anchorage, AK	Lia Nitake; Ian Ross-Frye	Laura Munana; Luke Munana	No other competitors		
2002	Burbank, CA	Cheryl Russell; Kenny Metzger Jr.	Laura Smith; Andrew Smith	Kate Slattery; Patrick Connelly	Anna Scheumann; Levi McDonough	
2003	Salt Lake City, UT					
2004	Vancouver, WA					
2005	Escondido, CA	Caitlin Mallory; Brent Holdburg	Adrienne Koob-Doddy; Robert Antonelli	Mauri Gustafson; Logan Giulietti-Schmitt	Katrina Reyes; Jon Wright	
2006	Roseville, CA	Katrina Reyes; Jon Wright	Mauri Gustafson; Logan Giulietti-Schmitt	Pilar Bosley; John Corona	Clare Farrell; Ashley Deavers	
2007	Mountlake Terrace, WA	Lynn Kriengkrairut; Logan Giulietti-Schmitt	Shannon Wingle; Ryan Devereaux	Brianne Oswald; Buckley Withrow	Jessica Perino; William Avila	
2008	San Diego, CA	Rachel Tibbetts; Collin Brubaker	Rachel Richardson; Brad Coulter	Kaylyn Patitucci; Karl Edelmann	Michelle Pennington; Andrew Skillington	
2009	Scottsdale, AZ	Rachel Richardson; Brad Coulter	Charlotte Lichtman; Dean Copely	Katie Wyble; Justin Morrow	Alison Carey; Daniel Donigan	
2010	Jackson Hole, WY					
2011	Culver City, CA	Joylyn Yang; Jean-Luc Baker	Lorraine McNamara; Quinn Carpenter	Madeline Heritage; Nathaniel Fast	Natalie Wojton; Michael Soyfer	
2012	Salt Lake City, UT	Elliana Pogrebinsky; Ross Gudis	Madeline Heritage; Nathaniel Fast	Roxette Howe; Mark Jahnke	Cassandra Jeandell; Damian Dodge	
2013	Provo, UT	Madeline Heritage; Nathaniel Fast	Yura Min; Igor Ogay	Julia Biechler; Damian Dodge	Stacey Siddon; Jared Weiss	
2014	Oakland, CA	Chloe Lewis; Logan Bye	Emily Day; Kevin Leahy	Sammi Wren; Alexey Shchepetov	Rachel Brozina; Nicholas Taylor	
2015	Spokane, WA	Chloe Lewis; Logan Bye	Emily Day; Kevin Leahy	Christina Carreira; Anthony Ponomarenko	Maeve Pascoe; Micah Jaffe	
2016	Burbank, CA	Christina Carreira; Anthony Ponomarenko	Chloe Lewis; Logan Bye	Alina Efimova; Kyle MacMillan	Elizabeth Addas; Jonathan Schultz	
2017	Salt Lake City, UT	Alina Efimova; Kyle MacMillan	Elizabeth Addas; Jonathan Schultz	No other competitors		
2018	Spokane, WA	Chloe Lewis; Logan Bye	Jocelyn Haines; James Koszuta	Alina Efimova; Alexander Petrov	Molly Cesanek; Nikolay Usanov	
2019	Salt Lake City, UT	Molly Cesanek; Yehor Yehorov	Jocelyn Haines; James Koszuta	Katarina Wolfkostin; Howard Zhao	Alina Efimova; Alexander Petrov	
2020	Wenatchee, WA	Gianna Buckley; Anton Spiridonov	Breelie Taylor; Tyler Vollmer	No other competitors		
2021	No competition held due to the COVID-19 pandemic					
2022	No competition held due to the COVID-19 pandemic					
2023- 2025	No competition held					
2026	Henderson, NV	Jane Calhoun; Mark Zheltyshev	Effie Chen; Gordei Chitipakhovian	Aneta Vaclavikova; William Lissauer	Anaelle Kouevi; Yann Homawoo	

== Records ==
Records
Discipline	Most championship titles		
Discipline	Skater(s)	No.	Years
Men's singles	Rudy Galindo	5	1992-1996
Women's singles	Linda Fratianne	4	1976; 1978-80
Women's singles	Beatrisa Liang	4	2002-03; 2005; 2010
Pairs	Tai Babilonia; Randy Gardner	7	1974-80
Ice dance	Kim Krohn; Barry Hagan	5	1978-92
Ice dance	Susie Wynne; Joseph Druar	5	1983-85; 1987; 1989
