= 1944 U.S. Figure Skating Championships =

Figure skating competition

- Type: National championships
- Date: February 24 – 26
- Season: 1943–44
- Location: Minneapolis, Minnesota
- Host: Figure Skating Club of Minneapolis
- Venue: Minneapolis Arena

Champions
- Men's singles: James Lochead Jr. (Junior)
- Women's singles: Gretchen Merrill (Senior) & Madelon Olson (Junior)
- Pairs: Doris Schubach and Walter Noffke (Senior) & Donna Jeanne Pospisil and Jean-Pierre Brunet (Junior)
- Ice dance: Marcella May and James Lochead Jr. (Senior) & Marilyn Grace and William Hoyt (Junior)
- Previous: 1943 U.S. Championships
- Next: 1945 U.S. Championships

The 1944 U.S. Figure Skating Championships were held from February 24–26 at the Minneapolis Arena in Minneapolis, Minnesota. Gold, silver, and bronze medals were awarded in men's singles, women's singles, pair skating, and ice dance at the senior, junior, and novice levels. Men's singles was only contested at the junior and novice levels, as most of the country's top male figure skaters were in the military due to World War II.

== Senior results ==
The senior men's event was cancelled in 1944 because all but one of the skaters who would have competed had enlisted in the military. Arthur Preusch II, the only remaining senior men's competitor, instead performed in exhibition.

=== Women's singles ===
Women's results
| Rank | Skater |
|---|---|
| 1st place, gold medalist(s) | Gretchen Merrill |
| 2nd place, silver medalist(s) | Dorothy Goos |
| 3rd place, bronze medalist(s) | Ramona Allen |
| 4 | Janette Ahrens |
| 5 | Margaret Grant |

=== Pairs ===
Pairs' results
| Rank | Team |
|---|---|
| 1st place, gold medalist(s) | Doris Schubach; Walter Noffke |
| 2nd place, silver medalist(s) | Janette Ahrens; Arthur Preusch II |
| 3rd place, bronze medalist(s) | Marcella May; James Lochead Jr. |

=== Ice dance ===
Ice dance results
| Rank | Team |
|---|---|
| 1st place, gold medalist(s) | Marcella May; James Lochead Jr. |
| 2nd place, silver medalist(s) | Kathe Mehl; Harold Hartshorne |
| 3rd place, bronze medalist(s) | Mary Andresen; Jack Andresen |

== Junior results ==
=== Men's singles ===
Men's results
| Rank | Skater |
|---|---|
| 1st place, gold medalist(s) | James Lochead Jr. |
| 2nd place, silver medalist(s) | Michael McGean |
| 3rd place, bronze medalist(s) | Robert Swenning |

=== Women's singles ===
Women's results
| Rank | Skater |
|---|---|
| 1st place, gold medalist(s) | Madelon Olson |
| 2nd place, silver medalist(s) | Shirley Lander |
| 3rd place, bronze medalist(s) | Joan Yocum |
| 4 | Jeanne Peterson |
| 5 | Margaret Field |
| 6 | Jeanne Leroux |
| 7 | Patty Sonnekson |
| 8 | Rozanne Bassett |

=== Pairs ===
Pairs' results
| Rank | Team |
|---|---|
| 1st place, gold medalist(s) | Donna Jean Pospisil; Jean-Pierre Brunet |
| 2nd place, silver medalist(s) | Karol Kennedy; Peter Kennedy |
| 3rd place, bronze medalist(s) | Sally Blair; Huntington Blair |
| 4 | Joanne Frazier; Michael McGean |
| 5 | Catherine McDonald; Tom Gilshannon |

=== Ice dance ===
Ice dance results
| Rank | Team |
|---|---|
| 1st place, gold medalist(s) | Marilyn Grace; William Hoyt |
| 2nd place, silver medalist(s) | Nancy Blair; Michael McGean |
| 3rd place, bronze medalist(s) | Elisabeth Daub; William Hickok IV |
| 4 | Yvonne Cameron; Dean Cameron |
