= Dona Lee Carrier =

American figure skater

- Dona Lee Carrier

Personal information
- Born: October 23, 1940 National City, California
- Died: February 15, 1961 (aged 20) near Kampenhout, Belgium
- Cause of death: Plane crash

Figure skating career
- Country: United States
- Partner: Roger Campbell
- Coach: William Kipp
- Skating club: Los Angeles Figure Skating Club

Dona Lee Carrier (October 23, 1940 – February 15, 1961) was an American figure skater who competed in ice dancing with Roger Campbell.

== Personal details ==
Carrier was born in National City, California, the only child of Rev. Floyd C. and Eleanor M. Carrier. She started skating at 11 years old after she moved to Seattle with her parents. The family moved to the Capital District of New York in 1955, where Carrier attended Albany High School and graduated from Troy High School in 1957, and thereafter southern California.

== Training ==
In high school, Carrier was a member of the Figure Skating Club of Troy. After moving to North Hollywood, Carrier joined the Los Angeles Figure Skating Club at the Polar Palace. However, she had difficulty finding a permanent ice dancing partner. In club and regional competitions, she competed in pairs and ice dancing, with partners including Campbell, Howie Harrold and Dr. Robert Wilkins. After U.S. World Team members Campbell and Yvonne Littlefield dissolved their ice dancing partnership, Campbell and Carrier began skating together in September 1960, winning the 1961 Southwest Pacific Regional and 1961 Pacific Coast Sectional ice dancing titles -– Carrier's first competition victories.

== Medals ==
Carrier and Campbell won the silver medal at the 1961 United States Figure Skating Championships, earning them the right to compete a month later at the World Championships in Prague. They also finished second at the North American Figure Skating Championships that year. She became known as a Cup of the Gold on the Ice as she won a gold medal.

== Plane crash ==
Carrier and Campbell died along with their teammates on February 15, 1961, when Sabena Flight 548 crashed en route to the World Championships. A $10 million USFS Memorial Fund was set up to honor the crash victims to support the training of promising young skaters. She was 20 years old. She is interred at Forest Lawn Memorial Park in Glendale, California.

== Legacy ==
On January 28, 2011, Carrier was inducted into the United States Figure Skating Hall of Fame as part of the 1961 U.S. World Team.

== Results ==
(with Roger Campbell)

Event	1961
North American Championships	2nd
U.S. Championships	2nd
