= Vern Taylor =

Canadian figure skater and coach

Personal information
- Full name: Vern Taylor

Figure skating career
- Country: Canada
- Coach: Sheldon Galbraith
- Skating club: TCS & CC

Vern Taylor is a Canadian figure skater and coach. He is the 1978 and 1979 Canadian silver medalist and 1977 bronze medalist. At the 1978 World Figure Skating Championships, he became the first person to land a triple Axel jump in competition.

== Competitive highlights ==
International
Event	72–73	73–74	74–75	75–76	76–77	77–78	78–79
World Champ.						12th	15th
Skate Canada					8th	8th	4th
Prague Skate							2nd
National
Canadian Champ.	1st N		6th J	1st J	3rd	2nd	2nd
Levels: N = Novice; J = Junior
