= Vanessa Lam =

American figure skater

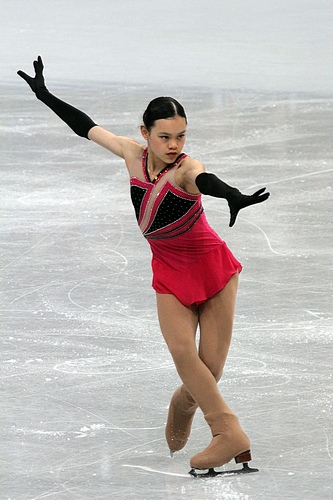
- Lam in 2012

Personal information
- Born: June 19, 1995 (age 31) Pasadena, California, U.S.
- Home town: Bellflower, California, U.S.
- Height: 5 ft 1 in (155 cm)

Figure skating career
- Country: United States
- Discipline: Women's singles
- Coach: Tammy Gambill, Sondra Holmes
- Skating club: All Year FSC
- Began skating: 2000

Vanessa Lam (born June 19, 1995) is an American former figure skater. She won two gold medals on the ISU Junior Grand Prix series and competed at the 2012 World Junior Championships.

== Personal life ==
Vanessa Lam was born in Pasadena, California. She is of Chinese and Cambodian descent. She has an elder sister, Nina.

Vanessa went on to pursue a degree in Integrative Biology at Harvard University. She graduated in 2018. She is currently focusing on giving back to the community through education, now working as an AmeriCorps Member at City Year.

== Career ==
Lam started skating at age 5 with her older sister. She debuted on the ISU Junior Grand Prix series in the 2010–11 season, winning gold in the Czech Republic.

In the 2011–12 JGP season, Lam won bronze in Australia and gold in Austria. She qualified for the Final in Quebec, where she placed fifth. She finished 13th at the 2012 World Junior Championships.

Lam placed fourth at her lone 2012–13 ISU Junior Grand Prix assignment. She withdrew from the 2013 U.S. Nationals due to knee and hip injuries sustained during training.

== Programs ==
Season	Short program	Free skating	Exhibition
2013–2014	Illumination by Secret Garden	The Artist by Ludovic Bource	
2012–2013	The Gadfly by Dmitri Shostakovich; Romance; Folkfeast	The Artist by Ludovic Bource	Call Me Maybe by Carly Rae Jepsen
2011–2012	Con te partirò by Francesco Sartori	Rhapsody on a Theme of Paganini by Sergei Rachmaninoff	
2010–2011	Con te partirò by Francesco Sartori	Introduction and Rondo Capriccioso; Danse Macabre by Camille Saint-Saëns	
2009–2010	West Side Story by Leonard Bernstein	Introduction and Rondo Capriccioso; Danse Macabre by Camille Saint-Saëns	
2008–2009	Fascination; Moulin Rouge; Paris canaille by André Rieu	Sleeping Beauty by Pyotr Ilyich Tchaikovsky performed by the Royal Concertgebouw Orchestra	

== Competitive highlights ==
GP = Grand Prix; JGP = Junior Grand Prix

International
Event	05–06	06–07	07–08	08–09	09–10	10–11	11–12	12–13	13–14
GP Rostelecom									WD
Finlandia Trophy									5th
International: Junior
Junior Worlds							13th		
JGP Final							5th		
JGP Australia							3rd		
JGP Austria							1st		
JGP Czech Rep.						1st			
JGP France								4th	
National
U.S. Champ.				9th J	8th J	7th	9th	WD	20th
U.S. Junior Champ.		5th I							
Pacific Coast				3rd J	2nd J	1st		1st	1st
SWP Regionals	14th V	4th I	12th N	4th J	1st J			1st	
WD = Withdrew; Levels: V = Juvenile; I = Intermediate; N = Novice; J = Junior
