= Rory Flack =

American figure skater

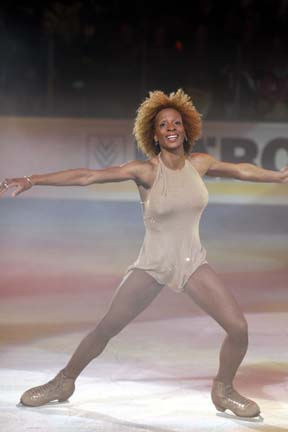
- Flack at the 2007 Nurnberg Gala

Personal information
- Full name: Ellen "Rory" Flack
- Born: April 28, 1969 (age 57) Belleville, Illinois
- Home town: San Diego, California

Figure skating career
- Country: United States
- Skating club: Color of Ice Academy
- Retired: 1991 (competitive skating)

Rory Flack (born April 28, 1969) is a professional figure skater and former competitor. She is the first African American woman to perform a back flip on the ice in 1991. In 1994 she became the first African-American woman to win the US Open Professional Figure Skating Championships.

== Personal life ==
Rory Flack was born in Belleville, Illinois. She is the daughter of Dorothy Jackson and William Flack, and is the niece of Roberta Flack. Raised in Phoenix, Arizona, until the age of 10, then until she was 21 in San Diego, California, she later resided for 15 years in Wasilla, Alaska. She was married to 8X Austrian National Champion & 1992 Olympian Ralph Burghart from 1992 to 2007, with whom she has two sons, Rendell Burghart, born September 28, 1993, and Remington Burghart, born January 17, 1997. Rendell played tennis for Eastern Washington University and Graduated on the Deans List majoring in Film. Remington is a 2011 United States National Juvenile Bronze Pairs Medalist. and competed 2017 to COVID-19 Internationally for club ESI-Skating, SkateAustria International Competitive Team.

Flack married Roi Mitchell Sr. on April 6, 2015, in Washington, D.C..

== Skating career ==
Flack began skating at the age of five. When she was 13, she met the pioneer for African Americans in figure skating, Mabel Fairbanks. Fairbanks inspired Flack to continue skating after wanting to stop at an early age due to racism.

== Results ==
International
| Event | 1985–86 | 1986–87 | 1987–88 |
|---|---|---|---|
| Grand Prix International St. Gervais | | | 2nd |
National
| U.S. Championships | 3rd J | 12th | 15th |
| Pacific Coast Sectionals | 1st J | | |
J = Junior level
