= Roger Campbell =

American ice dancer

Personal information
- Full name: Roger Hunter Campbell
- Born: August 15, 1942 Providence, Kentucky, U.S.
- Died: February 15, 1961 (aged 18) near Kampenhout, Belgium
- Cause of death: Plane crash

Figure skating career
- Country: United States
- Partner: Dona Lee Carrier
- Skating club: Arctic Blades Figure Skating Club

Roger Hunter Campbell (August 15, 1942 – February 15, 1961) was an American figure skater who competed in ice dancing.

== Personal details ==
Campbell was born in Providence, Kentucky to Al and Ann Brownloe (née Brooks) Campbell. After leaving public school to focus on skating, Campbell attended the Hollywood Professional School, a school for working child actors, athletes, and other entertainers, from which he graduated high school.

== Skating career ==
Campbell trained with the Los Angeles Figure Skating Club, then the Arctic Blades Figure Skating Club in Paramount, California.

Competing with Diane Sherbloom in 1958 and 1959, the pair placed second in junior ice dancing at the 1959 United States Figure Skating Championships.

Campbell next competed in pairs ice dancing with Yvonne Littlefield in 1959 and 1960. The pair won the silver medal at the 1960 Pacific Coast Sectional, the bronze medal at the 1960 United States Figure Skating Championships, and finished eighth at that year's World Figure Skating Championships in Vancouver. The partnership dissolved in November 1960.

After the dissolution of the partnership with Littlefield, Campbell teamed up with Dona Lee Carrier. Carrier and Campbell finished second at the U.S. Championships, earning them the right to compete a month later at the World Championships in Prague. They also finished second at the North American Figure Skating Championships that year.

== Death and legacy ==
Campbell, Carrier, and his mother Ann Campbell died on February 15, 1961, when Sabena Flight 548 crashed near Brussels en route to the World Championships. Campbell and his mother were buried in Big Hill Cemetery in Providence, Kentucky.

In January 2011, Campbell was inducted into the United States Figure Skating Hall of Fame as part of the 1961 U.S. World Team.

== Results ==
(with Yvonne Littlefield)

Event	1960
World Championships	8th
U.S. Championships	3rd

(with Dona Lee Carrier)

Event	1961
North American Championships	2nd
U.S. Championships	2nd
