= Iceland (film) =

1942 film by H. Bruce Humberstone

- Theatrical poster
- Directed by: H. Bruce Humberstone
- Written by: Robert Ellis; Helen Logan
- Produced by: William LeBaron
- Starring: Sonja Henie; John Payne; Jack Oakie; Felix Bressart; Eugene Turner
- Cinematography: Arthur C. Miller
- Edited by: James B. Clark
- Distributed by: 20th Century-Fox
- Release date: August 12, 1942
- Running time: 79 min.
- Country: United States
- Language: English
- Box office: $1.7 million (US rentals)

Iceland is a 1942 musical film released by 20th Century-Fox, directed by H. Bruce Humberstone and stars skater Sonja Henie and John Payne as a U.S. Marine posted in Iceland during World War II. The film was titled Katina in Great Britain and Marriage on Ice in Australia. The film also featured Sammy Kaye and His Orchestra.

Fox reteamed their two leads and director from the previous year's musical Sun Valley Serenade and set the story in the then contemporary American Marine landing and occupation of Iceland in 1941. Payne had previously played a Marine in Fox's To the Shores of Tripoli also directed by Humberstone. Among the songs are "There Will Never Be Another You" and "You Can't Say No to a Soldier".

Some Icelanders protested against the film for its depiction of Marines winning away the local women. Henie's on-ice partner during the filmed skating sequences was 1940/41 U.S. Champion Eugene Turner.

== Cast ==
- Sonja Henie as Katina Jonsdottir
- John Payne as Capt. James Murfin
- Jack Oakie as Slip Riggs
- Felix Bressart as Papa Jonsdottir
- Sterling Holloway as Sverdrup Svenssen
- Osa Massen as Helga Jonsdottir
- Joan Merrill as Adele Wynn
- Fritz Feld as Herr Tegnar
- Sammy Kaye and His Orchestra as Themselves
- Louis Adlon as Valtyr Olafson (credited as Duke Adlon)

== Reception ==
Reviewer Dennis Schwartz gave the film a C+ rating, describing it as "entertaining but superficial" while giving credit to its direction and its songs.
