= Eugene Turner =

American figure skater

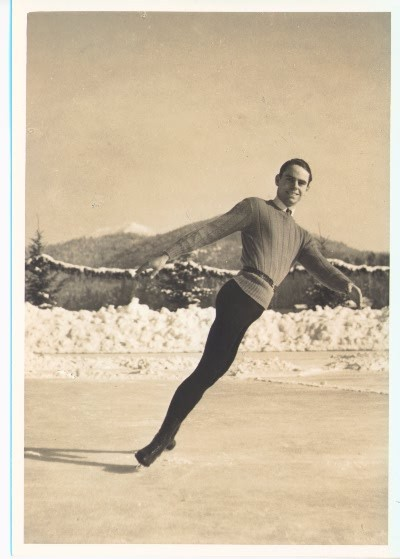

Personal information
- Born: November 26, 1920 Los Angeles, California
- Died: January 14, 2010 (aged 89) Yountville, California

Figure skating career
- Country: United States
- Skating club: Los Angeles FSC
Medal record
Representing United States
Men's Figure skating
North American Championships
Silver medal – second place	1941 Philadelphia	Men's singles
Pairs' Figure skating
North American Championships
Silver medal – second place	1941 Philadelphia	Pairs

Eugene Turner (November 26, 1920 – January 14, 2010) was an American champion figure skater who competed in single skating, pair skating and ice dancing. He also coached professionally for 60 years, skated in films and authored skating works. He was born and raised in Los Angeles, California where he graduated from John Marshall High School, and spent most of his life and career in Northern California.

== Skating career ==
Turner won the men's singles title at the 1940 and 1941 United States Figure Skating Championships. Also in 1941, he became the first skater to medal in three disciplines at one U.S. Championship, adding the pairs title with Donna Atwood and the silver medal in ice dancing with Elizabeth Kennedy. Self-taught with the Los Angeles Figure Skating Club, he was the first skater from west of the Mississippi River to win a U.S. senior title.

Turner did not appear in the Winter Olympics or World Championships which were subject to worldwide cancellation from 1940 to 1946 due to World War II and post-war rebuilding. During the war, Turner served as a lieutenant in the U.S. Army Air Forces, piloting a single seat P-47 Thunderbolt from bases in France for over 60 missions against German forces. After the war, he became a coach and skated professionally.

Turner partnered with Sonja Henie during her tour and in Iceland in 1942. He also performed as a skating double for Cary Grant in The Bishop's Wife in 1948, and for Patric Knowles in the Abbott & Costello comedy, Hit the Ice in 1943.

As a coach, he taught or set programs for Allen Schramm, Dudley Richards, Karol Kennedy, Peter Kennedy, Catherine Machado, Richard Dwyer, Tim Brown, Andree Anderson, Lorin O'Neil Caccamise, and Tenley Albright. He authored one book, "The Skaters," and Skating magazine carried his columns in the 1980s.

Eugene Turner was inducted into the United States Figure Skating Hall of Fame in 1983 and the Professional Skaters Association Coaches Hall of Fame in 2012. and his high school athletic hall of fame in 2017

== Results ==
(men's singles)

Event	1937	1938	1939	1940	1941
North American Championships					2nd
U.S. Championships	2nd J	1st J	3rd	1st	1st

(pairs with Donna Atwood)

Event	1941
North American Championships	2nd
U.S. Championships	1st

(ice dance with Elizabeth Kennedy)

Event	1941
U.S. Championships	2nd
