= Tiffany Stiegler =

American figure skater

Personal information
- Born: January 14, 1984 (age 42) Santa Monica, California

Figure skating career
- Country: United States
- Skating club: Los Angeles FSC

Tiffany Stiegler (born January 14, 1984) is an American figure skater who competed in both pair skating and ice dancing. Competing in pairs with her brother Johnnie Stiegler, she won the bronze medal at the 1998 Sparkassen Cup on Ice and placed fourth at the 1999 World Junior Championships.

== Personal life ==
Tiffany Stiegler was born on January 14, 1984, in Santa Monica, California. She is the sister of Stephanie and Johnnie, both of whom also competed in figure skating.

She married Joseph ("Woody") Woodrow Stahl on June 28, 2014.

== Career ==
Tiffany Stiegler's first partner was her brother Johnnie, with whom she competed until 2003. They are the 1998 and 1999 U.S. pewter medalists and the 1997 junior national champions. They were coached by Irina Rodnina and Alexander Zaitsev in El Segundo, California. They represented the Los Angeles Figure Skating Club.

In the 2003–04 season, Stiegler skated with Bert Cording. They placed 9th at the 2004 U.S. Championships.

In the 2004–05 season, Stiegler began competing in ice dancing with Sergei Magerovski. They won the pewter medal at the 2005 U.S. Championships. They were coached by Igor Sphilband and Marina Zueva in Canton, Michigan.

Stiegler became a co-coach with her sister at the Toyota center in El Segundo, California.

== Programs ==
=== With Magerovski ===
| Season | Original dance | Free dance |
|---|---|---|
| 2005–06 | Chilly Cha Cha; Rhumba; Merengue | Notre-Dame de Paris by Riccardo Cocciante |
| 2004–05 | | Evita by Andrew Lloyd Webber, Madonna; Buenos Aires; Don't Cry for Me Argentina |

=== With Stiegler ===
| Season | Short program | Free skating |
|---|---|---|
| 2002–03 | Yomokokova; Black Magic Woman by Santana | Spartacus by Aram Khachaturian |
| 2001–02 | Concerto No. 1 by Pyotr Ilyich Tchaikovsky | Romeo and Juliet by Pyotr Ilyich Tchaikovsky |

== Competitive highlights ==
GP: Grand Prix; JGP: Junior Series / Junior Grand Prix)

=== Pair skating with Stiegler ===
International
| Event | 94–95 | 95–96 | 96–97 | 97–98 | 98–99 | 99–00 | 00–01 | 01–02 | 02–03 |
|---|---|---|---|---|---|---|---|---|---|
| GP Cup of Russia | | | | | | WD | | | |
| GP Skate Canada | | | | | | 8th | | | |
| GP Skate America | | | | | 8th | | | | |
| GP Sparkassen | | | | | 3rd | | | | |
International: Junior
| Junior Worlds | | | | 8th | 4th | | | 7th | |
| JGP Final | | | | 6th | | | | | 4th |
| JGP Canada | | | | | | | | | 2nd |
| JGP Germany | | | | 4th | | | | | 3rd |
| JGP Ukraine | | | | 2nd | | | | | |
National
| U.S. Champ. | 1st N | 4th J | 1st J | 4th | 4th | 5th | WD | 9th | 8th |
Levels: N = Novice; J = Junior. WD = Withdrew

=== Pair skating with Cording ===
| Event | 2003–04 |
|---|---|
| U.S. Championships | 9th |
| Pacific Coast Sectionals | 1st |

=== Ice dancing with Magerovski ===
International
| Event | 2004–05 | 2005–06 |
|---|---|---|
| GP Skate America | | 7th |
| Nebelhorn Trophy | | 5th |
National
| U.S. Championships | 4th | 6th |
