= Robin Greiner =

American figure skater (1932–2021)

Personal information
- Full name: Robinson Lewis Greiner, Jr
- Born: August 24, 1932 San Jose, California, U.S.
- Died: November 7, 2021 (aged 89) Fresno, California, U.S.

Figure skating career
- Country: United States
Medal record
Figure skating: Pairs
Representing United States
North American Championships
Silver medal – second place	1955 Regina	Pairs
Silver medal – second place	1953 Cleveland	Pairs

Robinson Lewis Greiner, Jr. (August 24, 1932 – November 7, 2021) was an American pair skater. With Carole Ormaca, he was a four-time consecutive U.S. national champion, from 1953 to 1956. They placed fourth at three World Championships and finished fifth at the 1956 Winter Olympics.

Greiner later competed with Sheila Wells, taking silver at the 1958 U.S. Championships. In 1965, he was inducted into the Fresno County Athletic Hall of Fame along with his skating partner, Carole Ormaca. Greiner later moved to Fresno where he became an activist for GLBT rights and social justice. In 2008, he legally married his partner of 43 years, Ellis Vance.

== Results ==
=== With Ormaca ===
Event	1953	1954	1955	1956
Winter Olympic Games				5th
World Championships		4th	4th	4th
North American Championships	2nd		2nd	
U.S. Championships	1st	1st	1st	1st

=== With Wells ===
Event	1958
U.S. Championships	2nd
