= Lloyd Baxter =

American football player (1923–2010)

No. 33
- Position: Center

Personal information
- Born: January 18, 1923; Howe, Texas, U.S.
- Died: February 2, 2010 (aged 87); Austin, Texas, U.S.
- Listed height: 6 ft 2 in (1.88 m)
- Listed weight: 210 lb (95 kg)

Career information
- High school: Sherman (Texas)
- College: Louisiana Tech; Southern Methodist
- NFL draft: 1945: 24th round, 252nd overall pick

Career history
- Green Bay Packers (1948)

Career NFL statistics
- Games played: 11
- Fumble recoveries: 1
- Stats at Pro Football Reference

Lloyd Thomas Baxter (January 18, 1923 – February 2, 2010) was a center in the National Football League (NFL). Baxter was born on January 18, 1923 in Howe, Texas.

== Early life and education ==
He graduated from Sherman High School before serving as a second lieutenant in the United States Marines during World War II. He served in the South Pacific and China Theaters during his military service.

== Career ==
Baxter was drafted by the Green Bay Packers in the twenty-fourth round of the 1945 NFL draft, although he continued his college education after his military service instead of playing for the Packers immediately. He played at the college football at Louisiana Tech University and Southern Methodist University (SMU). At SMU, he played in the 1948 Cotton Bowl Classic and received his bachelor's degree in physical education. Curly Lambeau signed Baxter in for the 1948 season to help replace Charley Brock, who left to coach college football. Baxter played 11 games for the Packers that season, recording one fumble recovery.
