= Roger Berry (figure skater) =

American ice dancer

Roger Berry is an American former competitive ice dancer. With Alma Davenport, he is the 1967 U.S. national silver medalist and placed ninth at the 1967 World Championships.

He later competed with Gaie Shoman. Berry turned professional in 1969 in order to take a coaching position. He taught for several years at the Ice Capades Challet at Laural Plaza Mall in Van Nuys, California. He also coached in Aalborg, Denmark from 1981 to 1982. As of 2009, Berry is on the coaching staff at Valley Ice Center in Panorama City, California.

== Personal life ==
Berry was from Los Angeles, California and attended Hollywood Professional School. He came from a skating family. His father, Ernest Berry, was one of the first elite competitors from California, having won the Pacific Coast senior men's title in 1938.

Berry married Gaie Shoman in 1969. He was later married to Margaret Dewar, who died of cancer in 2002.

== Ice dancing results ==
(with Kathy Flaherty)

Event	1965
U.S. Championships	1st J.

(with Davenport)

Event	1967
World Championships	9th
U.S. Championships	2nd
