= Sandi Sweitzer =

American former figure skater (born 1946)

Personal information
- Full name: Sandi Sue Sweitzer
- Born: September 16, 1946 (age 79) Santa Monica, California

Figure skating career
- Country: United States
- Partner: Roy Wagelein
- Skating club: Pickwick Center Skating Club
- Retired: 1968

Sandi Sue Sweitzer (born September 16, 1946) is an American former figure skater who competed in pairs with Roy Wagelein. They won the silver medal at the 1968 U.S. Championships and competed at the 1968 Winter Olympics.

== Personal life ==
Sweitzer was born on September 16, 1946, in Santa Monica, California. She married Roy Wagelein following the 1968 Olympics and the two had a daughter, Kristia, before divorcing.

== Career ==
Sweitzer was a member of the Pickwick Center Skating Club. She teamed up with Wagelein ahead of the 1967–68 season.

Sweitzer/Wagelein were awarded the silver medal at the 1968 U.S. Championships, having finished second to Cynthia Kauffman / Ronald Kauffman. They were included in the U.S. team to the 1968 Winter Olympics in Grenoble, France. The pair placed 8th in the short program, 6th in the free skate, and 7th overall at the Olympics. Making their final competitive appearance, they placed 8th at the 1968 World Championships in Geneva, Switzerland.

After retiring from competition, Sweitzer/Wagelein performed with the West Company of the Ice Capades for seven years.

== Results ==
With Wagelein

International
Event	1968
Winter Olympics	7th
World Championships	8th
National
U.S. Championships	2nd
