= Peter Oppegard =

American pair skater and coach (born 1959)

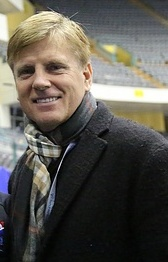
- Oppegard in 2016

Personal information
- Born: August 23, 1959 (age 66) Knoxville, Tennessee, U.S.
- Height: 6 ft 0 in (183 cm)

Figure skating career
- Country: United States
- Skating club: LAFSC (Los Angeles Figure Skating Club)
- Retired: 1988
Medal record
Pairs' figure skating
Representing the United States
Olympic Games
Bronze medal – third place	1988 Calgary	Pairs
World Championships
Bronze medal – third place	1987 Cincinnati	Pairs

Peter Allen Oppegard (born August 23, 1959) is an American retired pair skater and coach. With his partner Jill Watson, he is the 1988 Olympic bronze medalist and a three-time U.S. national champion.

In May 2022, Oppegard was suspended for one month by the U.S. Center for SafeSport for misconduct.

== Career ==
Oppegard initially paired with Vicki Heasley. He began competing with Watson in 1985. In their career, Watson and Oppegard won three national titles, a world bronze medal, an Olympic bronze medal, and various other medals. During Watson and Oppegard's free skate at the 1988 Olympics, a photographer dropped his camera bag onto the ice and an usher walked onto the ice to pick it up while the pair was performing an overhead lift.

As a coach, his skaters have won ten national singles and pairs titles. The Professional Skaters Association and US Figure Skating named Oppegard "Choreographer of the Year" and "Coach of the Year". He coached at the East West Ice Palace in southern California until 2018.

== Personal life ==
Oppegard was married to Karen Kwan, sister of world champion figure skater Michelle Kwan. As of 2017, they were estranged.

== Abuse allegations and suspension ==
In February 2021, USA Today reported that Oppegard had been under investigation by the United States Center for SafeSport since July 2020 for allegations of physical abuse, including throwing coffee and hot water at skaters he coached at the East West Ice Palace. American pairs skater Jessica Pfund also alleged that Oppegard bit her on the upper right arm during a training session in 2013, when Pfund was 15 years old. In May 2022, Oppegard was suspended for one month by the U.S. Center for SafeSport for "physical and emotional" misconduct.

== Results ==
=== With Watson ===
International
Event	84–85	85–86	86–87	87–88
Winter Olympics				3rd
World Championships	4th	6th	3rd	6th
Fujifilm Trophy				1st
NHK Trophy			2nd	
Skate America		1st		
National
U.S. Championships	1st	2nd	1st	1st
