= Stephanie Stiegler =

American former pair skater (born 1980)

Personal information
- Full name: Stephanie Stiegler
- Born: January 2, 1980 (age 46) Manhattan Beach, California

Figure skating career
- Country: United States
- Retired: 1997

Stephanie Stiegler (born January 2, 1980, in Manhattan Beach, California) is an American former pair skater. With partner John Zimmerman, she is the 1997 U.S. bronze medalist. With partner Lance Travis, she is the 1995 U.S. bronze medalist. She is the older sister of Tiffany Stiegler and Johnnie Stiegler.

== Competitive highlights ==
GP = Champions Series (later Grand Prix)

=== With John Zimmerman ===
International
Event	1995–96	1996–97
World Championships		15th
GP Trophée Lalique		6th
GP Skate America		3rd
National
U.S. Championships	4th	3rd

=== With Lance Travis ===
International
Event	1992–93	1993–94	1994–95
Nations Cup			3rd
Skate America			6th
NHK Trophy		8th	
Nebelhorn Trophy		3rd	
Grand Prix de St. Gervais		2nd	
National
U.S. Championships	1st J	5th	3rd
J = Junior level
