= Michelle Ford (figure skater) =

American figure skater

Michelle Ford is an American figure skater.

== Biography ==
Born in Detroit, Ford grew up in Scottsdale, Arizona and began ice skating at 7 years of age. As a youngster she skated singles and pairs with her brother who was later killed in a car accident at the age of 12.

As a teenager, Ford began ice dancing with partner Glenn Parriott, competing for the Skating Club of Phoenix. They became Junior National champions at the U.S. Championships in 1972 held in Long Beach, California. After splitting with Parriott, Ford started skating with Glenn Patterson in 1973.

She and Patterson ranked third in the Nation in 1974, 1975, and 1977 in senior dance. They represented the United States internationally in competitions in Moscow, China, and England. They were also alternates for the 1976 Olympic team.

After placing third in the 1977 U.S. Championships, Ford and Patterson turned professional, traveling as principal skaters in the Ice Follies for two years. During this time, they had their own highlighted dance numbers and skated the characters Betty Lou and Ernie in the Sesame Street segment of the show.

In 1979, Ford moved to San Diego and began coaching ice dancing and freestyle skating at the San Diego Ice Arena. Returning to competition in 2004, she skated with Team del Sol representing the San Diego Figure Skating Club, which took third place in the Adult Synchronized Team category at the U.S. Synchronized Team Skating Championships held at the San Diego Sports Arena. Ford directed the annual Christmas show at the San Diego Ice Arena in 2002 and has choreographed numbers in the show since they began the tradition many years ago. She also created, and produced and directed the ice show at Viejas Casino in Alpine, CA in 2008 and 2009.

In 2008, Ford developed a wireless teaching device named Silent Coach. Initially intended as an aid for ice skating coaches, it is also used by coaches in tennis, ballet, ballroom dancing, and other sports.

== Results ==
Ice dance with Glenn Parriott:

Event	1972
U.S. Championships	1st J.

Ice dance with Glenn Patterson

Event	1974	1975	1977
U.S. Championships	3rd	3rd	3rd
