= Johnnie Stiegler =

American pair skater

Personal information
- Full name: John Stiegler
- Born: April 25, 1982 (age 44) Santa Monica, California

Figure skating career
- Country: United States
- Skating club: Los Angeles FSC
- Retired: 2003

John "Johnnie" Stiegler (born April 25, 1982) is an American former pair skater. With his sister Tiffany, he won the bronze medal at the 1998 Sparkassen Cup on Ice.

The Stieglers began skating together as children. After winning the junior title at the 1997 U.S. Championships, they were awarded pewter medals on the senior national level in 1998 and 1999. They placed fourth at the 1999 World Junior Championships. Irina Rodnina and Alexander Zaitsev coached the pair in El Segundo, California. They represented the Los Angeles Figure Skating Club.

Their older sister Stephanie was also a competitive skater.

== Programs ==
with Tiffany Stiegler

| Season | Short program | Free skating |
|---|---|---|
| 2002–03 | Yomokokova; Black Magic Woman by Santana | Spartacus by Aram Khachaturian |
| 2001–02 | Concerto No. 1 by Pyotr Ilyich Tchaikovsky | Romeo and Juliet by Pyotr Ilyich Tchaikovsky |

== Competitive highlights ==
GP: Grand Prix; JGP: Junior Series / Junior Grand Prix)

with Tiffany Stiegler

International
| Event | 94–95 | 95–96 | 96–97 | 97–98 | 98–99 | 99–00 | 00–01 | 01–02 | 02–03 |
|---|---|---|---|---|---|---|---|---|---|
| GP Cup of Russia | | | | | | WD | | | |
| GP Skate Canada | | | | | | 8th | | | |
| GP Skate America | | | | | 8th | | | | |
| GP Sparkassen | | | | | 3rd | | | | |
International: Junior
| Junior Worlds | | | | 8th | 4th | | | 7th | |
| JGP Final | | | | 6th | | | | | 4th |
| JGP Canada | | | | | | | | | 2nd |
| JGP Germany | | | | 4th | | | | | 3rd |
| JGP Ukraine | | | | 2nd | | | | | |
National
| U.S. Champ. | 1st N | 4th J | 1st J | 4th | 4th | 5th | WD | 9th | 8th |
Levels: N = Novice; J = Junior. WD = Withdrew
