= Joan Zamboni =

American ice dancer

Joan Zamboni (1933– 7 October 2017) was an American ice dancer who competed with partner Roland Junso. They won the gold medal at the 1956 United States Figure Skating Championships and finished fourth at the World Figure Skating Championships in 1956 and 1957.

She was the niece of Frank Zamboni, inventor of the ice resurfacer machine that bears the family name.
