= Burt Lancon =

American pair skater

Burt Jude Lancon (born November 13, 1960, in Morgan City, Louisiana) is an American former pair skater. Competing with partner Maria DiDomenico, he won the silver medal at the 1982 United States Figure Skating Championships. The following year, he teamed up with Jill Watson. The couple was two-time bronze medalists at the U.S. Championships and finished sixth at the 1984 Winter Olympic Games. Burt went on to compete as a professional. After winning the US Open Pair Championship title, He also won the US Professional Championships in 1987. He went on to compete at the World Professional Championships (Jaca, Spain) where he and his partner won 1st place. In 1997 Burt Lancon and Cindy Landry (Canada) Competed on the USA Network in "Improv Ice." Burt and Cindy won second place. He also was in the background of episode 25 of "The Office", Michael's Birthday, as a temporary replacement of Oscar.

== Results ==
(pairs with Jill Watson)

International
Event	1982–83	1983–84
Winter Olympics		6th
World Championships	11th	WD
Skate America		2nd
National
U.S. Championships	3rd	3rd
WD = Withdrew
