= Scott Wendland =

American pair skater (born 1965)

Scott Wendland (born April 11, 1965, in Spokane, Washington) is an American former pair skater. Early in his career, he competed with Ashley Stevenson and Shelley Propson. In 1990, he teamed up with Jenni Meno, and they competed in the 1992 Winter Olympics. After that season, Meno left Wendland for another partner.

Following his competitive days, Wendland was an ice skating coach. He later became a technical specialist, as well starting a business that refinishes kitchens and bathrooms.

== Competitive highlights ==
=== Single skating ===
Event	1984
U.S. Championships	9th J.

=== Pair skating with Stevenson ===
Event	1986–1987
International St. Gervais	2nd

=== Pair skating with Propson ===
Event	1989
U.S. Championships	12th

=== Pair skating with Meno ===
International
Event	1990–1991	1991–1992
Olympics		11th
World Championships	10th	11th
Skate Canada		5th
National
U.S. Championships	3rd	2nd
