= Jean-Pierre Brunet =

French-American figure skater

Jean-Pierre Brunet (17 September 1930 – 3 August 1948) was a French-American figure skater. Born in France, he was the son of Olympic champion pair skaters Pierre Brunet and Andrée Joly Brunet. Jean-Pierre also competed in pairs with Donna J. Pospisil, and the pair won the title at the U.S. Figure Skating Championships twice. He died at age 17 in an auto accident.

== Competitive highlights ==
(with Pospisil)

Event	1945	1946
U.S. Championships	1st	1st
