= Peter Betts =

American former figure skater

Peter Betts is an American former figure skater. Skating with Yvonne Littlefield, he won the ice dance title at the 1962 United States Figure Skating Championships.

Littlefield and Betts were married immediately after the 1963 U.S. Championships, where they won the silver medal. At the 1963 World Figure Skating Championships, disaster struck them during the free dance, when screws attaching Betts's skate blade to the boot fell out. They were given permission to restart after making repairs, but the screws again came loose, and they were unable to complete their program. After this season, they retired from competition and took up coaching. One of Betts's first students was Peggy Fleming, who was training with him when she won her first national title in 1964.

== Results ==
(with Yvonne Littlefield)

Event	1962	1963
World Championships	7th	17th
North American Championships		4th
U.S. Championships	1st	2nd
