= Lance Travis =

American former pair skater (born 1969)

Lance Travis (born June 21, 1969) is an American former pair skater. With partner Stephanie Stiegler, he was the U.S. junior champion in 1993 and the bronze medalist at the United States Figure Skating Championships in 1995. He later teamed with Sara Ward and finished fifth at nationals in 1996.

Lance Travis currently works as a coach in Greensboro, North Carolina.

== Results ==
(with Stiegler)

International
Event	1992–1993	1993–1994	1994–1995
Nations Cup			3rd
Skate America			6th
NHK Trophy		8th	
Nebelhorn Trophy		3rd	
Grand Prix de St. Gervais		2nd	
National
U.S. Championships	1st J.	5th	3rd
J. = Junior level
