= Yvonne Gómez =

Spanish figure skater (born 1966)

Personal information
- Full name: Yvonne Gómez Muñoz
- Born: December 19, 1966 (age 59) San Francisco, California, U.S.
- Height: 5 ft 2 in (1.57 m)

Figure skating career
- Country: Spain; United States
- Coach: Linda Leaver

Yvonne Gómez Muñoz (born December 19, 1966) is a Spanish-American former competitive figure skater who competed internationally for both Spain and the United States. She represented Spain at the 1988 Winter Olympics and the 1988 and 1989 World Championships.

Born in San Francisco, California, she was member of the United States International Team (1983-1987), she represented the United States in two World University Games claiming the bronze medal at the 1987 Winter Universiade. She, along with her lifelong friend Brian Boitano, was coached by Linda Leaver and the three remain the best of friends to this day. Following her retirement from competitive skating, Gómez skated professionally on the Brian Boitano and Katarina Witt Ice Skating Tour, USA and Canada (1990-1992) and had the role of Michaela in Horant H. Hohlfeld's Emmy winning HBO movie "Carmen on Ice", 1990. She lives in San Francisco with her husband and two children.

== Television ==
After retiring from professional skating, Gómez spent the next decade carving out a career in television, sport, and entertainment programming. Mentored by renowned CBS sports director Bob Fishman, Gómez became an Emmy nominated television director of network entertainment television specials and international figure skating competitions (NBC, CBS, ABC, ESPN, Turner, PBS, Lifetime), World figure skating championships and numerous television specials featuring Olympic figure skaters and musicians such as Seal, Barry Manilow, Ray Charles, Josh Groban, Burt Bacharach, Andrea Bocelli, Smokey Robinson, Demi Lovato, Wynona Judd, Gretchen Wilson, Sara Evans, Michael Bolton, Michael McDonald, Bella Thorne, Cody Simpson, Goo Goo Dolls, Backstreet Boys, Chicago, Jonas Brothers, Frankie Vali, Amy Grant, Chris Isaac, Celtic Woman, Earth Wind and Fire, Ashanti, Foreigner, Heart, Train, O.A.R, and Aretha Franklin.

She has earned two Daytime Emmy Directing nominations for Outstanding Directing in a Special Category (2003, 2008).

== Mental performance coaching ==
While a television director, Gómez returned to university and obtained a master's degree in Sport Psychology. This was an area of interest from her competitive figure skating days. She worked with Dr. Bruce Ogilvie, one of the pioneers of sports psychology in the United States. She currently works with the University of San Francisco Athletic Department (Men's Basketball, Baseball, Tennis, Cross Country, Track & Field, Golf, Soccer; Women's Basketball, Volleyball, Soccer, Golf, Cross Country, Track and Field), San Francisco Elite Soccer Academy, Spanish Olympic Figure Skating Federation, University of New Mexico Volleyball, and individual athletes on the Symmetra Golf Tour, European PGA, US International and National Figure Skating Team, Junior National Squash, Formula Russell car racing, Major League Soccer, United Soccer League and a youth athletes in multiple disciplines.

She also provides coaching workshops and executive presentations for national and multinational corporations such as Divon Academy, Make a Wish Foundation, and Accenture.

== Figure skating results ==
Event	82–83 (USA)	83–84 (USA)	84–85 (USA)	85–86 (USA)	86–87 (USA)	87–88 (ESP)	88–89 (ESP)
Olympics						18th	
Worlds						13th	18th
Europeans							10th
Danubius Trophy				1st			
Ennia Challenge			3rd				
NHK Trophy					5th		4th
Universiade					3rd		
U.S. Championships	2nd J	8th		7th	10th		
Spanish Championships						1st	1st
