= Doris Schubach =

American pair skater

Doris V. Schubach (January 11, 1924 – August 10, 2003) was an American figure skater who competed in pairs with her husband Walter Noffke. They won the gold medal at the United States Figure Skating Championships for three straight years, from 1942 to 1944. The pair later married and went on to finish sixth at the World Figure Skating Championships in 1947.

== Results ==
(pairs with Noffke)

| Event | 1942 | 1943 | 1944 | 1945 | 1946 | 1947 |
|---|---|---|---|---|---|---|
| World Championships | | | | | | 6th |
| U.S. Championships | 1st | 1st | 1st | | | |
