= Patricia Vaeth =

American figure skater (1926–2006)

- Born: September 4, 1926; Colorado Springs, Colorado
- Died: June 8, 2006 (aged 79)
- Occupation: American figure skater

Patricia Jean Vaeth Croke (1926-2006) was an American figure skater who competed in pair skating. At the age of 14, she won the silver medal at the 1941 United States Figure Skating Championships and the bronze medal at the North American Figure Skating Championships with partner Jack Might.

== Results ==
(pairs with Jack Might)

Event	1941
North American Championships	3rd
U.S. Championships	2nd
