= Sheldon Galbraith =

Canadian figure skating coach (1922–2015)

Sheldon Galbraith CM OOnt
- Born: Sheldon William Galbraith; May 24, 1922; Sturgeon Creek, Manitoba
- Died: April 14, 2015 (aged 92); Toronto, Ontario
- Known for: figure skating coach
- Awards: Order of Canada; Order of Ontario

Sheldon William Galbraith CM OOnt (May 24, 1922 – April 14, 2015) was a Canadian figure skating coach whose students have won all three categories at World Championships (men's, ladies' and pairs'). His students also won Canada's first Olympic gold medals in the ladies' and pairs' competitions.

== History ==
Born in Sturgeon Creek, Manitoba, the youngest of four children of William James Boyd and Mabel Agnes Frederika Mabel, he moved with his family to Tacoma, Washington in 1928. In 1943, he married Jeanne Schulte.

His students have included Barbara Ann Scott, Frances Dafoe, Norris Bowden, Barbara Wagner, Gary Beacom, Robert Paul, Donald Jackson and Vern Taylor. He was the Winter Olympics Canadian team coach in 1948, 1956 and 1960.

He was a founder of the Professional Skaters' Association of Canada and was its first president.

In 1980, he was inducted into Canada's Sports Hall of Fame. In 1991, he was inducted into the Canadian Figure Skating Hall of Fame. In 1996, he was inducted into the World Figure Skating Museum and Hall of Fame, and in 2003 the Professional Skaters Association Coaches Hall of Fame. In 1999, he was made a Member of the Order of Canada (CM). In 2005, he was appointed Member of the Order of Ontario (OOnt). He died on April 14, 2015.
