= Jill Watson =

American retired pair skater and coach

Personal information
- Born: March 29, 1963 (age 63) Bloomington, Indiana, U.S.
- Height: 4 ft 11 in (150 cm)

Figure skating career
- Country: United States
- Retired: 1988
Medal record
Pairs' figure skating
Representing the United States
Olympic Games
Bronze medal – third place	1988 Calgary	Pairs
World Championships
Bronze medal – third place	1987 Cincinnati	Pairs

Jill Marilynn Watson (born March 29, 1963, in Bloomington, Indiana) is an American retired pair skater and coach. With her partner Peter Oppegard, she is the 1988 Olympic bronze medalist and a three-time U.S. national champion.

Watson was initially paired with Burt Lancon, with whom she won two national bronze medals in 1983 and 1984. She began competing with Oppegard in 1985. In their career, Watson and Oppegard won three national titles, a world bronze medal, an Olympic bronze medal, and various other medals. During Watson and Oppegard's free skate at the 1988 Olympics, a photographer dropped his camera bag onto the ice and an usher walked onto the ice to pick it up while the pair was performing an overhead lift on the other side of the rink.

She is now a coach at AZ Ice in the United States. She coached Rena Inoue/John Baldwin for five seasons.

Jill Watson and Peter Oppegard were inducted into the U.S. Figure Skating Hall of Fame in 2004.

== Results ==
=== Pairs with Peter Oppegard ===
International
Event	84–85	85–86	86–87	87–88
Winter Olympics				3rd
World Championships	4th	6th	3rd	6th
Fujifilm Trophy				1st
NHK Trophy			2nd	
Skate America		1st		
National
U.S. Championships	1st	2nd	1st	1st

=== Pairs with Burt Lancon ===
International
Event	1982–83	1983–84
Winter Olympics		6th
World Championships	11th	WD
Skate America		2nd
National
U.S. Championships	3rd	3rd
WD = Withdrew
