= Tisha Walker =

American figure skater

Personal information
- Born: c. 1975 (age 50–51)

Figure skating career
- Country: United States
- Coach: Doug Varvais, Lauri Varvais

Tisha Walker (born c. 1975-2026) was an American former competitive figure skater. She is the 1989 Prague Skate champion.

== Personal life ==
Walker was raised in Thousand Oaks, California.Tisha married Thomas Green in 1995. They have two daughters, Hannah and Nicole, born in the second half of the 1990s.

== Career ==
Walker was coached by Doug and Lauri Varvais at the Conejo Valley Ice Skating Center in Newbury Park, the Pickwick Ice Rink in Burbank, and the Ice Castle International Training Center in Lake Arrowhead, California.

Walker placed seventh at the 1990 World Junior Championships, held in November and December 1989 in Colorado Springs, Colorado, and won gold at the 1989 Prague Skate. She placed 6th at the 1991 Skate America and 8th at the 1992 Grand Prix International de Paris.

In NBC's 1994 made-for-TV movie Tonya and Nancy: The Inside Story, Walker served as the skating double for Alexandra Powers, who played Tonya Harding. As of 2016, she works as a skating coach at Iceoplex in Simi Valley, California.

== Competitive highlights ==
International
Event	87–88	88–89	89–90	90–91	91–92	92–93
Inter. de Paris						8th
Prague Skate			1st			
Skate America					6th	
International: Junior
Junior Worlds			7th			
Blue Swords		2nd J				
National
U.S. Champ.	8th J	3rd J	9th	5th	6th	8th
J = Junior level
