= Roy Wagelein =

American figure skater

Personal information
- Full name: Roy Charles Wagelein
- Born: October 14, 1943 New York City, New York, United States
- Died: June 24, 2008 (aged 64) Phoenix, Arizona, United States

Figure skating career
- Country: United States
- Partner: Sandi Sweitzer; Susan Behrens
- Skating club: Los Angeles FSC
Medal record
Representing the United States
Figure skating: Pairs
North American Championships
Silver medal – second place	1967 Montreal	Pairs

Roy Charles Wagelein (October 19, 1943 – June 24, 2008) was an American pair skater. He was the 1967 North American silver medalist with Susan Behrens and competed with Sandi Sweitzer at the 1968 Winter Olympics, finishing 7th.

== Personal life ==
Wagelein was born on October 19, 1943, in New York City. In 1961, he graduated from the Hollywood Professional School in Hollywood, California. He married Sandi Sweitzer following the 1968 Olympics and the two had a daughter, Kristia, before divorcing. Wagelein died on June 24, 2008, in Phoenix, Arizona.

== Career ==
Wagelein started skating as a 22-month-old at the Hollywood Polar Palace and became a member of the Los Angeles Figure Skating Club. He also trained at the Pasadena Winter Garden and Pickwick Ice.

Wagelein originally competed in partnership with Susan Behrens. After becoming the 1965 national junior silver medalists, the pair moved up to the senior level and took silver behind Cynthia Kauffman / Ronald Kauffman at the 1966 U.S. Championships in Berkeley, California. They were then sent to their first major international, the 1966 World Championships in Davos, Switzerland, where they ranked 11th. The following year, Behrens/Wagelein won silver behind the Kauffmans at the U.S. Championships in Omaha, Nebraska and at the North American Championships in Montreal, Canada. They finished 7th at the 1967 World Championships in Vienna, Austria.

In the 1967–68 season, Wagelein competed with Sandi Sweitzer. The two were awarded the silver medal behind the Kauffman siblings at the 1968 U.S. Championships and were included in the U.S. team to the 1968 Winter Olympics in Grenoble, France. They placed 8th in the short program, 6th in the free skate, and 7th overall at the Olympics. Making their final competitive appearance, they placed 8th at the 1968 World Championships in Geneva, Switzerland.

After retiring from competition, Sweitzer/Wagelein performed with the West Company of the Ice Capades for seven years.

== Results ==
=== With Sweitzer ===
International
Event	1968
Winter Olympics	7th
World Championships	8th
National
U.S. Championships	2nd

=== With Behrens ===
International
Event	1965	1966	1967
World Championships		11th	7th
North American Champ.			2nd
National
U.S. Championships	2nd J	2nd	2nd
J = Junior level
