= Carole Ormaca =

American pair skater (1936–2025)

Personal information
- Full name: Carole Anne Ormaca Butler
- Born: June 2, 1936 Fresno, California, U.S.
- Died: May 1, 2025 (aged 88) Fresno, California, U.S.

Figure skating career
- Country: United States
Medal record
Pairs' figure skating
Representing the United States
North American Championships
Silver medal – second place	1955 Regina	Pairs
Silver medal – second place	1953 Cleveland	Pairs

Carole Anne Ormaca Butler (June 2, 1936 – May 1, 2025) was an American pair skater who competed with Robin Greiner. The duo won the gold medal at the United States Figure Skating Championships four straight times, beginning in 1953. They also placed fourth at the World Figure Skating Championships three times and finished in fifth place at the 1956 Winter Olympic Games.

In 1965, Carole Ormaca Butler was inducted into the Fresno County Athletic Hall of Fame along with her skating partner, Robin Greiner.

Butler died on May 1, 2025, at the age of 88.

== Results ==
(pairs with Robin Greiner)

Event	1953	1954	1955	1956
Winter Olympic Games				5th
World Championships		4th	4th	4th
North American Championships	2nd		2nd	
U.S. Championships	1st	1st	1st	1st

== Sources ==
- Evans, Hilary; Gjerde, Arild; Heijmans, Jeroen; Mallon, Bill; et al. "Carole Ormaca". Olympics at Sports-Reference.com. Sports Reference LLC. Archived from the original on 2020-04-18.
