= James Lochead =

American figure skater

James Kenneth Lochead Jr. (December 23, 1923 - July 25, 1999) was an American figure skater. He competed in ice dance, winning the gold medal at the 1943 and 1944 United States Figure Skating Championships with partner Marcella May. He also competed in pairs with May, winning the bronze medal at Nationals in 1944 and 1945, and in men's singles, capturing the silver at the national championships in 1946. Away from the ice, Lochead graduated from the University of California at Berkeley and later earned a master's degree from Harvard University. He later worked for Standard Oil and spent many years living in London.
