= Marcella May =

American figure skater (1922–2014)

Marcella May Willis Walker (May 13, 1922 – February 17, 2014) was an American figure skater. She competed in ice dance, winning the gold medal at the 1943 and 1944 United States Figure Skating Championships with partner James Lochead. He also competed in pairs with Lochead, winning the bronze medal at Nationals in 1944 and 1945.

Following her competitive career, she was a figure skating judge.
