= Catherine Machado =

American figure skater

Personal information
- Full name: Catherine Louise Machado
- Born: April 20, 1936 Santa Monica, California
- Died: September 14, 2021 (aged 85)

Figure skating career
- Country: United States
- Retired: 1956

Catherine Louise Machado (April 20, 1936 – September 14, 2021) was an American figure skater. She was born in Santa Monica, California. She was a two-time U.S. national bronze medalist. In 1956, Machado became the first Latina to represent the United States at a Winter Olympics. After the 1956 World Championships, she turned professional. She was inducted into the United States Figure Skating Hall of Fame in 2005.

== Results ==
International
| Event | 1952 | 1953 | 1954 | 1955 | 1956 |
|---|---|---|---|---|---|
| Winter Olympics | | | | | 8th |
| World Championships | | | | 10th | 6th |
National
| U.S. Championships | 6th J | 2nd J | 1st J | 3rd | 3rd |
J = Junior
