= Yvonne Littlefield =

American ice dancer

Yvonne Littlefield is an American former ice dancer. Skating with Peter Betts, she won the ice dance title at the 1962 United States Figure Skating Championships. She had previously won the Bronze medal at the 1960 U.S. Championships skating with Roger Campbell.

Littlefield and Betts were married immediately after the 1963 U.S. Championships, where they won the Silver medal. At the 1963 World Figure Skating Championships, disaster struck them during the free dance, when screws attaching Betts's skate blade to the boot fell out. They were given permission to restart after making repairs, but the screws again came loose, and they were unable to complete their program. After this season, they retired from competition and took up coaching.

Littlefield later was divorced from Betts and married John Nicks.

== Results ==
(with Roger Campbell)

Event	1960
World Championships	8th
U.S. Championships	3rd

(with Peter Betts)

Event	1962	1963
World Championships	7th	17th
North American Championships		4th
U.S. Championships	1st	2nd
