= Eastern Sectional Figure Skating Championships =

American figure skating competition

The Eastern Sectional Figure Skating Championships is an annual figure skating competition sanctioned by U.S. Figure Skating, which has been held since 1938. It is one of three sectional competitions, alongside the Midwestern Sectional Figure Skating Championships and Pacific Coast Sectional Figure Skating Championships.

Skaters compete in five levels: Senior, Junior, Novice, Intermediate, and Juvenile. Medals are given out in four colors: gold (first), silver (second), bronze (third), and pewter (fourth). Stand-alone sectional competitions are held for men's singles and women's singles, but as of the 2022–23 season, not for ice dance or pairs. Per 2022 Governing Council approval, the pathway for advancement in the two partnered disciplines has changed to: National Qualifying Series directly to U.S. Ice Dance Final and U.S. Pairs Final (both for entries from all sections), and then to U.S. Figure Skating Championships.

Modifications began in the 2019–20 season to the conventional structure that skaters who place in the top four at the Eastern Sectional advance to U.S. Figure Skating Championships. As of the 2019–20 season, the top two Novice skaters per sectional in men's singles and in women's singles advance to Junior-level competition at U.S. Figure Skating Championships -- which no longer holds singles competition at the level of Novice, Intermediate, or Juvenile. Starting with the 2022–23 season, only the top two Senior skaters per sectional in men's singles and in women's singles have been guaranteed to advance to U.S. Figure Skating Championships; next-best sectional scores nationwide (across all sections, in other words) have become necessary for other Senior singles competitors to advance.

For ice dance and pairs, U.S. Figure Skating Championships discontinued Novice, Intermediate and Juvenile competition starting in the 2019–20 season, but brought back Novice ice dance and Novice pairs for the 2023-24 and 2024–25 seasons.

Starting in the 2019–20 season, top Novice, Intermediate, and Juvenile skaters from Sectional Singles Finals (as they now are named), U.S. Ice Dance Final, and U.S. Pairs Final qualify for National High Performance Development Team camp.

Notable skaters who have competed at Easterns over the years include Olympic gold medalists Dick Button, Tenley Albright, Carol Heiss, Dorothy Hamill, Scott Hamilton and Nancy Kerrigan.

== Senior medalists ==
=== Men ===
Season	Location	Gold	Silver	Bronze	Pewter	Details
1938	Lake Placid, NY	Roger Turner	Wilfred MacDonald	Otto Dallmayer	No pewter medals awarded	
1939	New York, NY	Arthur Vaughn, Jr.	Edward Berkson	No other competitors	No pewter medals awarded	
1940-1941	Rye, NY	No competition held			No pewter medals awarded	
1942	New York, NY	Arthur Vaughn, Jr.	Edward LeMaire	No other competitors	No pewter medals awarded	
1943	New Haven, CT	Edward LeMaire	Arthur Vaughn, Jr.	Wilhelm Junker	No pewter medals awarded	
1944	Lake Placid, NY	No competition held			No pewter medals awarded	
1945	Boston, MA	Richard Button	Robert Swenning	No other competitors	No pewter medals awarded	
1946	Baltimore, MD	Richard Button	Charles Brinkman	Robert Swenning	No pewter medals awarded	
1947	Ardmore, PA	Wilhelm Junker	Newbold Black	Robert Swenning	No pewter medals awarded	
1948	Lake Placid, NY	Carleton Hoffner	Donald Jacoby	Newbold Black	No pewter medals awarded	
1949	Boston, MA	Donald Jacoby	Dudley Richards	Walter Bainbridge	No pewter medals awarded	
1950	Rye, NY	Dudley Richards	Donald Laws	Donald Jacoby	No pewter medals awarded	
1951	Troy, NY	Dudley Richards	William Lemmon Jr.	George Manuel	No pewter medals awarded	
1952	Troy, NY	William Lemmon Jr.	George Manuel	Eugene Meyle	No pewter medals awarded	
1953	Lake Placid, NY	Noel Ledin	Peter Pender	Charles Foster	No pewter medals awarded	
1954	Boston, MA	Noel Ledin	David Travers	Peter Pender	No pewter medals awarded	
1955	Princeton, NJ	David Travers	Bradley Lord	Larry Lovett	No pewter medals awarded	
1956	Rochester, NY	Raymond Blommer	Barlow Nelson	Bradley Lord	No pewter medals awarded	
1957	Hershey, PA	Bradley Lord	Peter Betts	No other competitors	No pewter medals awarded	
1958	Troy, NY	Gregory Kelley	Carl Olsson	Frank Muckian	No pewter medals awarded	
1959	Rye, NY	Gregory Kelley	Frank Carroll	Bruce Heiss	No pewter medals awarded	
1960	Lake Placid, NY	Frank Carroll	Bruce Heiss	Scott Allen	No pewter medals awarded	
1961	West Orange, NJ	Thomas Litz	Scott Allen	David Edwards	No pewter medals awarded	
1962	Lake Placid, NY	Thomas Litz	Scott Allen	Richard Callaghan	No pewter medals awarded	
1963	Ardmore, PA	Richard Callaghan	Peter Meyer	Paul McGrath	No pewter medals awarded	
1964	New Haven, CT	Richard Callaghan	Paul McGrath	W. Patrick Lalor	No pewter medals awarded	
1965	Boston, MA	Paul McGrath	Bob Black	John Dystal	No pewter medals awarded	
1966	Hershey, PA	W. Patrick Lalor	Jeffrey Hall	Gordon McKellen, Jr.	No pewter medals awarded	
1967	Buffalo, NY	W. Patrick Lalor	Bob Black	No other competitors	No pewter medals awarded	
1968	South Weymouth, MA	No competition held			No pewter medals awarded	
1969	Wilmington, DE	W. Patrick Lalor	Gordon McKellen, Jr.	James Stuart	No pewter medals awarded	
1970	Philadelphia, PA	W. Patrick Lalor	James Stuart	Gordon McKellen, Jr.	No pewter medals awarded	
1971	Boston, MA	Gordon McKellen, Jr.	Dean Hiltzik	David Baltin	No pewter medals awarded	
1972	Hershey, PA	Dean Hiltzik	Mahlon Bradley	Stephen Savino	No pewter medals awarded	
1973	Lake Placid, NY	Stephen Savino	Scott Henderson	Mahlon Bradley	No pewter medals awarded	
1974	Lexington, MA	Scott Cramer	Stephen Savino	Mahlon Bradley	No pewter medals awarded	
1975	Ardmore, PA	Mahlon Bradley	Scott Cramer	Scott Henderson	No pewter medals awarded	
1976	New York, NY	Mahlon Bradley	Tim Zink	Christopher Kales	No pewter medals awarded	
1977	Boston, MA	Mahlon Bradley	Tim Zink	Charles Carapazza	No pewter medals awarded	
1978	Philadelphia, PA	Mahlon Bradley	Allen Schramm	Tim Zink	No pewter medals awarded	
1979	Rochester, NY	Allen Schramm	Reggie Raiford	Richard Rigby	No pewter medals awarded	
1980	Danvers, MA	Scott Hamilton	Reggie Raiford	Robert Faulkner	No pewter medals awarded	
1981	Wilmington, DE	Scott Hamilton	Allen Schramm	James White	No pewter medals awarded	
1982	Morristown, NJ	Scott Hamilton	Bobby Beauchamp	James White	No pewter medals awarded	
1983	South Yarmouth, MA	Bobby Beauchamp	J. Scott Driscoll	Robert Rosenbluth	No pewter medals awarded	
1984	Philadelphia, PA	Scott Hamilton	Bobby Beauchamp	Angelo D'Agustino	No pewter medals awarded	
1985	Lake Placid, NY	Bobby Beauchamp	Angelo D'Agustino	Tom Cierniak	No pewter medals awarded	
1986	Boxborough, MA	Paul Wylie	Angelo D'Agostino	Doug Mattis	No pewter medals awarded	
1987	Alexandria, VA	Angelo D'Agostino	Mark Mitchell	Steven Rice	Jon Robinson	
1988	Morristown, NJ	Doug Mattis	Mark Mitchell	Brian Grant	Jon Robinson	
1989	Darien, CT	Steven Rice	Mark Mitchell	Doug Mattis	Jon Robinson	
1990	Mt. Lebanon, PA	Mark Mitchell	Richard Sears	Colin VanderVeen	Jon Robinson	
1991	Geneseo, NY	Michael Chack	Colin VanderVeen	Alex Chang	Richard Sears	
1992	Bridgeport, CT	Michael Chack	Alex Chang	Colin VanderVeen	Edmund Nesti	
1993	Newark, DE	Michael Chack	Colin VanderVeen	Paul Dulebohn	No other competitors	
1994	West Orange, NJ	Shepherd Clark	Colin VanderVeen	Paul Dulebohn	Steven Smith	
1995	Fitchburg, MA	Michael Chack	Jason Sylvia	Michael Weiss	Shepherd Clark	
1996	Alexandria, VA	Derrick Delmore	Philip Dulebohn	E. Stuart Golden	Jason Sylvia	
1997	Hicksville, NY	Shepherd Clark	Aren Nielsen	Philip Dulebohn	Derrick Delmore	
1998	Simsbury, CT	Shepherd Clark	Jeff Merica	Eric Bohnstedt	Michael Edgren	
1999	Oldsmar, FL	Jeff Merica	Jere Michael	Scott Smith	Dwayne Parker	
2000	West Orange, NJ	Shepherd Clark	Jeff Merica	Derrick Delmore	Kurt Fromknecht	
2001	Marlborough, MA	Johnny Weir	Kurt Fromknecht	Joshua Figurido	Scott Smith	
2002	Pittsburgh, PA	Michael Weiss	Derrick Delmore	Scott Smith	Shepherd Clark	
2003	Aston, PA	Parker Pennington	Shaun Rogers	Shepherd Clark	Kurt Fromknecht	
2004	Lake Placid, NY	Johnny Weir	Matthew Lind	Derrick Delmore	Mauro Bruni	
2005	Boxborough, MA	Derrick Delmore	Shaun Rogers	Mauro Bruni	Jason Wong	
2006	Bethlehem, PA	Scott Smith	Shaun Rogers	Derrick Delmore	Tommy Steenberg	
2007	Alpharetta, GA	Derrick Delmore	Jordan Miller	Craig Ratterree	Shaun Rogers	
2008	Raleigh, NC	Tommy Steenberg	Parker Pennington	Derrick Delmore	Shaun Rogers	
2009	Boston, MA	Shaun Rogers	Curran Oi	Jason Wong	Tommy Steenberg	
2010	Newark, DE	Shaun Rogers	Jason Wong	Michael Solonoski	Daniel Raad	
2011	Aston, PA	Scott Dyer	Jason Wong	Wesley Campbell	Lloyd Ting	
2012	Jamestown, NY	Stephen Carriere	Wesley Campbell	Alexander Aiken	Alexander Zahradnicek	
2013	Hyannis, MA	Stephen Carriere	Harrison Choate	Wesley Campbell	Grant Hochstein	
2014	Ashburn, VA	Timothy Dolensky	Grant Hochstein	Stephen Carriere	Daniel Raad	
2015	Wake Forest, NC	Grant Hochstein	Timothy Dolensky	Patrick Rupp	Jimmy Ma	
2016	Simsbury, CT	Jimmy Ma	Ben Jalovick	Emmanuel Savary	Curran Oi	
2017	Indian Trail, NC	Kevin Shum	Emmanuel Savary	Jimmy Ma	Oleksiy Melnyk	
2018	Boxborough, MA	Timothy Dolensky	Kevin Shum	Jimmy Ma	Emmanuel Savary	
2019	Wake Forest, NC	Timothy Dolensky	Jimmy Ma	Kevin Shum	Tony Lu	
2020	Hyannis, MA	Jimmy Ma	William Hubbart	Tony Lu	Jun Hong Chen	
2021-2022	No competition held					
2023	Norwood, MA	Maxim Naumov	Andrew Torgashev	Philip Baker	Jacob DeWolfe	
2024	Coral Springs, FL	Will Annis	Daniel Samohin	Lucas Altieri	Emmanuel Savary	
2025	Boston, MA	Emmanuel Savary	Lucius Kazanecki	Philip Baker	William Annis	
2026	North Charleston, SC	Emmanuel Savary	Lucius Kazanecki	Will Annis	Ken Mikawa	

=== Women ===
Season	Location	Gold	Silver	Bronze	Pewter	Details
1938	Lake Placid, NY	Katherine Durbrow	Mary Bendix		No pewter medals awarded	
1939	New York, NY	Jane Vaughn	Charlotte Walther	Phebe Tucker	No pewter medals awarded	
1940	Rye, NY	Jane Vaughn	Charlotte Walther	Roberta Jenks	No pewter medals awarded	
1941	Rye, NY	Charlotte Walther	Roberta Jenks	Phebe Tucker	No pewter medals awarded	
1942	New York, NY	Dorothy Goos	Roberta Jenks	Hildegarde Balmain	No pewter medals awarded	
1943	New Haven, CT	Mabel MacPherson	Hildegarde Balmain	Yvonne Sherman	No pewter medals awarded	
1944	Lake Placid, NY	Phebe Tucker	Hildegarde Balmain	Dorothy Glazier	No pewter medals awarded	
1945	Boston, MA	Phebe Tucker	Yvonne Sherman	Eileen Seigh	No pewter medals awarded	
1946	Baltimore, MD	Barbara Jones	Eileen Seigh	Yvonne Sherman	No pewter medals awarded	
1947	Ardmore, PA	Yvonne Sherman	Katheryn Ehlers	Donna Jeanne Popisil	No pewter medals awarded	
1948	Lake Placid, NY	Katheryn Ehlers	Andra McLaughlin	Sonya Klopfer	No pewter medals awarded	
1949	Boston, MA	Sonya Klopfer	Jo Barnum	Gloria Howley	No pewter medals awarded	
1950	Rye, NY	Tenley Albright	Carole Jean Hoag	Mimi Pong	No pewter medals awarded	
1951	Troy, NY	Tenley Albright	Carole Jean Hoag	Ellie Sonnemann	No pewter medals awarded	
1952	Troy, NY	Carol Heiss	Sheila Muldowney	Sarahann Wilson	No pewter medals awarded	
1953	Lake Placid, NY	Sheila Muldowny	Shirley Linde	Priscilla Ann Snow	No pewter medals awarded	
1954	Boston, MA	Nancy Heiss	Shirley Linde	Muriel Reich	No pewter medals awarded	
1955	Princeton, NJ	Muriel Reich	Nancy Heiss	Karin Hepp	No pewter medals awarded	
1956	Rochester, NY	Lynn Finnegan	Carol Joyce Wanek	Karin Hepp	No pewter medals awarded	
1957	Hershey, PA	Carol Wanek	Lynn Finnegan	Rickie Ann Rendich	No pewter medals awarded	
1958	Troy, NY	Laurence Owen	Lorraine Hanlon	Rickie Ann Rendich	No pewter medals awarded	
1959	Rye, NY	Laurence Owen	Rickie Ann Rendich	Mary Cooper	No pewter medals awarded	
1960	Lake Placid, NY	Lorraine Hanlon	Brenda Farmer	Mary Batdorf	No pewter medals awarded	
1961	West Orange, NJ	Carol Noir	Lorraine Hanlon	Lynn Thomas	No pewter medals awarded	
1962	Lake Placid, NY	Albertina Noyes	Joya Utermohlen	Ronna Goldblatt	No pewter medals awarded	
1963	Ardmore, PA	Albertina Noyes	Joya Utermohlen	Pamela Schneider	No pewter medals awarded	
1964	New Haven, CT	Carol Noir	Taffy Pergament	Ann Pellegrino	No pewter medals awarded	
1965	Boston, MA	Honey Kerr	Helen Dane	Pamela Schneider	No pewter medals awarded	
1966	Hershey, PA	Honey Kerr	Wendy Jones	Coco Gram	No pewter medals awarded	
1967	Buffalo, NY	Honey Kerr	Taffy Pergament	Wendy Jones	No pewter medals awarded	
1968	South Weymouth, MA	Wendy Jones	Fitzie Grogan	Nancy Brunnckow	No pewter medals awarded	
1969	Wilmington, DE	Joanna Darakjy	Wendy Jones	Lise Gantz	No pewter medals awarded	
1970	Philadelphia, PA	Joanna Darakjy	Suna Murray	Louise Vacca	No pewter medals awarded	
1971	Boston, MA	Suna Murray	Joanna Darakjy	Dorothy Hamill	No pewter medals awarded	
1972	Hershey, PA	Dorothy Hamill	Mary Marley	Denise Cahill	No pewter medals awarded	
1973	Lake Placid, NY	Elisabeth Freeman	Laura Johnson	Priscilla Hill	No pewter medals awarded	
1974	Lexington, MA	Priscilla Hill	Barbara Salomon	Elisabeth Freeman	No pewter medals awarded	
1975	Ardmore, PA	Barbara Salomon	Priscilla Hill	Ingrid Blomstrom	No pewter medals awarded	
1976	New York, NY	Priscilla Hill	Elisabeth Freeman	Barbara Salomon	No pewter medals awarded	
1977	Boston, MA	Priscilla Hill	Aimee Kravette	Grace Jones	No pewter medals awarded	
1978	Philadelphia, PA	Priscilla Hill	Carol Hansen	Aimee Kravette	No pewter medals awarded	
1979	Rochester, NY	Priscilla Hill	Simone Grigorescu	Aimee Kravette	No pewter medals awarded	
1980	Danvers, MA	Elaine Zayak	Priscilla Hill	Simone Grigorescu	No pewter medals awarded	
1981	Wilmington, DE	Elaine Zayak	Priscilla Hill	Melissa Thomas	No pewter medals awarded	
1982	Morristown, NJ	Elaine Zayak	Melissa Thomas	Simone Grigorescu	No pewter medals awarded	
1983	South Yarmouth, MA	Elaine Zayak	Jill Frost	Melissa Jeanne Thomas	No pewter medals awarded	
1984	Philadelphia, PA	Elaine Zayak	Jill Frost	Leslie Sikes	No pewter medals awarded	
1985	Lake Placid, NY	Leslie Sikes	Cynthia Romano	Leslie Friedman	No pewter medals awarded	
1986	Boxborough, MA	Tracey Damigella	Debbie Walls	Tracey Seliga	No pewter medals awarded	
1987	Alexandria, VA	Lily Lee	Julie Wasserman	Elisa Scheuermann	Danielle-Alyse Babaian	
1988	Morristown, NJ	Julie Wasserman	Kathaleen Kelly	Tracie Brown	Elisha Scheuermann	
1989	Darien, CT	Nancy Kerrigan	Jennifer Leng	Tracey Damigella	Kathaleen Kelly	
1990	Mt. Lebanon, PA	Nancy Kerrigan	Kyoko Ina	Kathaleen Kelly	Jennifer Leng	
1991	Geneseo, NY	Nancy Kerrigan	Kyoko Ina	Rosanna Tovi	Jessica Mills	
1992	Bridgeport, CT	Rosanna Tovi	Jessica Mills	Andrea Catoia	Dana MacDonald	
1993	Newark, DE	Karen Ann Gooley	Andrea Catoia	Amanda Farkas	Nicole Wasilewski	
1994	West Orange, NJ	Teresa Aiello	Elaine Zayak	Amanda Farkas	Patricia Mansfield	
1995	Fitchburg, MA	Kyoko Ina	Kathaleen Kelly Cutone	Patricia Mansfield	Lisa Bell	
1996	Alexandria, VA	Brittney McConn	Alizah Allen	Karen Ann Gooley	Kathaleen Kelly Cutone	
1997	Hicksville, NY	Brittney McConn	Kathaleen Kelly Cutone	Alizah Allen	Amy D'Entremont	
1998	Simsbury, CT	Morgan Rowe	Alice Sue Claeys	Christine Kong	Stacey Pensgen	
1999	Oldsmar, FL	Stacey Pensgen	Morgan Rowe	Abbi Gleeson	Alice Sue Claeys	
2000	West Orange, NJ	Stacey Pensgen	Sara Wheat	Stephanie Roth	Elizabeth Kwon	
2001	Marlborough, MA	Elizabeth Kwon	Sara Wheat	Stephanie Roth	Alicia Cavanaugh	
2002	Pittsburgh, PA	Patricia Mansfield	Stacey Pensgen	Sara Wheat	Andrea Varraux	
2003	Aston, PA	Louann Donovan	Jennifer Don	Patricia Mansfield	Krissa Miller	
2004	Lake Placid, NY	Suzanne McDonald	Jane Bugaeva	Louann Donovan	Erica Archambault	
2005	Boxborough, MA	Jane Bugaeva	Emily Hughes	Katherine Hadford	Megan Williams-Stewart	
2006	Bethlehem, PA	Stephanie Roth	Jane Bugaeva	Megan Williams-Stewart	Michelle Boulos	
2007	Alpharetta, GA	Kylie Gleason	Taylor Firth	Michelle Boulos	Megan Williams-Stewart	
2008	Raleigh, NC	Katrina Hacker	Melissa Bulanhagui	Megan Williams-Stewart	Stephanie Roth	
2009	Boston, MA	Joelle Forte	Brittney Rizo	Blake Rosenthal	Taylor Firth	
2010	Newark, DE	Blake Rosenthal	Melissa Bulanhagui	Samantha Cesario	Kristine Musademba	
2011	Aston, PA	Samantha Cesario	Melissa Bulanhagui	Kelsey Traunero	Joelle Forte	
2012	Jamestown, NY	Yasmin Siraj	Samantha Cesario	Joelle Forte	Haley Dunne	
2013	Hyannis, MA	Samantha Cesario	Yasmin Siraj	Haley Dunne	Joelle Forte	
2014	Ashburn, VA	Franchesca Chiera	Kiri Baga	Joelle Forte	Yasmin Siraj	
2015	Wake Forest, NC	Madison Vinci	Franchesca Chiera	Katie McBeath	Maria Yang	
2016	Simsbury, CT	Franchesca Chiera	Ashley Cain	Katie McBeath	Heidi Munger	
2017	Indian Trail, NC	Franchesca Chiera	Megan Wessenberg	Katie McBeath	Rebecca Peng	
2018	Boxborough, MA	Emmy Ma	Franchesca Chiera	Katie McBeath	Megan Wessenberg	
2019	Wake Forest, NC	Ting Cui	Megan Wessenberg	Julia Biechler	Rena Ikenishi	
2020	Hyannis, MA	Emily Zhang	Sarah Jung	Gracie Gold	Rena Ikenishi	
2021-2022	No competition held					
2023	Norwood, MA	Ava Ziegler	Ting Cui	Lara Annunziata	Jill Heiner	
2024	Coral Springs, FL	Sarah Everhardt	Alex Evans	Ting Cui	Courtney Hicks	
2025	Boston, MA	Ting Cui	Alex Evans	Katie Turcotte	Audrey Tanaka	
2026	North Charleston, SC	Sophie Joline von Felton	Ava Ziegler	Erica Machida	Michelle Lee	

=== Pairs ===
Season	Location	Gold	Silver	Bronze	Pewter	Details
1938	Lake Placid, NY	Grace Madden; J. Lester Madden	Annah Hall; William Penn-Gaskell Hall III	Ardelle Kloss Sanderson; Roland Janson	No pewter medals awarded	
1939	New York, NY	Eva Schwerdt Bruns; William Bruns Jr.	Mimi Polt; Leopold Polt	No other competitors	No pewter medals awarded	
1940	Rye, NY	Eva Schwerdt Bruns; William Bruns Jr.	Nettie Prantell; George Boltres	Dorothy Glazier; Stephen Tanner	No pewter medals awarded	
1941	Rye, NY	Dorothy Glazier; Michael Driscooll	Jean Matzke; Robert Matzke	Mrs. Howard Wilkinson; Howard Wilkinson	No pewter medals awarded	
1942	No competition held				No pewter medals awarded	
1943	New Haven, CT	Doris Schubach; Walter Noffke	No other competitors		No pewter medals awarded	
1944-1945	No competition held				No pewter medals awarded	
1946	Baltimore, MD	Yvonne Sherman; Robert J. Swenning	Anne Davies; Carleton Hoffner Jr.	No other competitors	No pewter medals awarded	
1947	Ardmore, PA	Yvonne Sherman; Robert J. Swenning	Anne Davies; Carleton Hoffner Jr.	No other competitors	No pewter medals awarded	
1948	Lake Placid, NY	Anne Davies; Carleton Hoffner Jr.	Irene Maguire; Walter Muehlbronner	Kathryn H. Ehlers; Jean-Pierre Brunet	No pewter medals awarded	
1949	Boston, MA	Irene Maguire; Walter Muehlbronner	Lois Waring; Walter Bainbridge Jr.	No other competitors	No pewter medals awarded	
1950	Rye, NY	Irene Maguire; Walter Muehlbronner	Ferne Fletcher; Edward Picken	No other competitors	No pewter medals awarded	
1951	Troy, NY	Tenley Albright; Dudley Richards	Caryl Johns; Jack B. Jost	Helen Mekalainas; Tom McGinnis	No pewter medals awarded	
1952	Troy, NY	Caryl Johns; Jack B. Jost	Carol Ann Peters; Danny Ryan	Barbara Davis; William T. Lemmon Jr.	No pewter medals awarded	
1953	Lake Placid, NY	Norma McCullagh; Robert Goodfellow	Susan Sterne; Peter Pender	Evelyn Carroll; Hillard Welch	No pewter medals awarded	
1954	Boston, MA	Anita Andres; Dudley Richards	Susan Sterne; Peter Pender	Evelyn Carroll; Hillard Welch	No pewter medals awarded	
1955	Princeton, NJ	Mary Kay Keller; Richard Keller	Maribel Yerxa Owen; Charles Foster	Elizabeth Lyons Casner; William T. Lemmon Jr.	No pewter medals awarded	
1956	Rochester, NY	Mary Kay Keller; Richard Keller	Maribel Yerxa Owen; Charles Foster	Nancy Rouillard; Ron Ludington	No pewter medals awarded	
1957	Hershey, PA	Mary Kay Keller; Richard Keller	No other competitors		No pewter medals awarded	
1958	Troy, NY	Maribel Yerxa Owen; Dudley Richards	Mary Kay Keller; Richard Keller	Kathy Coyle; Douglas Searfoss	No pewter medals awarded	
1959	Rye, NY	Maribel Yerxa Owen; Dudley Richards	Jeannie Gladding; Richard Kavanaugh	Kathy Coyle; Douglas Searfoss	No pewter medals awarded	
1960	Lake Placid, NY	Joan Heiser; Peter Betts	Elizabeth George; Paul George	Leona LeBel; Robert Dube	No pewter medals awarded	
1961	West Orange, NJ	Irma Staro; Richard Callaghan	Elizabeth George; Paul George	Margaret Davison; Roddy Van Sciver	No pewter medals awarded	
1962	Lake Placid, NY	Elizabeth George; Paul George	Irma Staro; Richard Callaghan	Karen Hoffman; Leo Fritzlo	No pewter medals awarded	
1963	Ardmore, PA	No competition held			No pewter medals awarded	
1964	New Haven, CT	Dianne Boucas; Roger Collard	Lynda Waldrop; Edwin Cossitt	No other competitors	No pewter medals awarded	
1965	Boston, MA	Betty Lewis; Richard Gilbert	Lynda Waldrop; Edwin Cossitt	Susan Gearhart; Bud Gearhart	No pewter medals awarded	
1966	Hershey, PA	Betty Lewis; Richard Gilbert	Michelle Viaux; Roger Collard	Susan Gearhart; Bud Gearhart	No pewter medals awarded	
1967-1969	No competition held				No pewter medals awarded	
1970	Philadelphia, PA	Kathy Normile; Gregory Taylor	Ann Parsic; Dan Pasaric	No other competitors	No pewter medals awarded	
1971	Boston, MA	Kathy Normile; Gregory Taylor	Cathy Mishkin; Donald Bonacci	Ann Parsic; Dan Pasaric	No pewter medals awarded	
1972	Hershey, PA	Gale Fuhrman; Joel Fuhrman	Kathy Normile; Gregory Taylor	Cathy Mishkin; Donald Bonacci	No pewter medals awarded	
1973	Lake Placid, NY	Gale Fuhrman; Joel Fuhrman	Emily Benenson; Johnny Johns	No other competitors	No pewter medals awarded	
1974	Lexington, MA	Tai Babilonia; Randy Gardner	Erika Susman; Thomas Huff	No other competitors	No pewter medals awarded	
1975	Ardmore, PA	Alice Cook; Bill Fauver	Sheryl Franks; Michael Botticelli	Judy Ferris; Kirk Wyse	No pewter medals awarded	
1976	New York, NY	Alice Cook; Bill Fauver	Gale Fuhrman; Joel Fuhrman	Lorene Mitchell; Donald Mitchell	No pewter medals awarded	
1977	Boston, MA	Sheryl Franks; Michael Botticelli	Lorene Mitchell; Donald Mitchell	Cheryl Stewart; Jeffrey Stewart	No pewter medals awarded	
1978	Philadelphia, PA	Sheryl Franks; Michael Botticelli	Kitty Carruthers; Peter Carruthers	Lorene Mitchell; Donald Mitchell	No pewter medals awarded	
1979	Rochester, NY	Sheryl Franks; Michael Botticelli	Tracy Prussack; Scott Prussack	Kitty Carruthers; Peter Carruthers	No pewter medals awarded	
1980	Danvers, MA	Kitty Carruthers; Peter Carruthers	Sheryl Franks; Michael Botticelli	Tracy Prussack; Scott Prussack	No pewter medals awarded	
1981	Wilmington, DE	Kitty Carruthers; Peter Carruthers	Lea Ann Miller; Bill Fauver	Lynne Freeman; Jay Freeman	No pewter medals awarded	
1982	Morristown, NJ	Kitty Carruthers; Peter Carruthers	Lea Ann Miller; Bill Fauver	Lynne Freeman; Jay Freeman	No pewter medals awarded	
1983	South Yarmouth, MA	Kitty Carruthers; Peter Carruthers	Gillian Wachsman; Robert Daw	Lynne Freeman; Jay Freeman	No pewter medals awarded	
1984	No competition held				No pewter medals awarded	
1985	Lake Placid, NY	Sandy Hurtubise; Craig Maurizi	Gillian Wachsman; Todd Waggoner	Tammy Crowson; Jay Freeman	No pewter medals awarded	
1986	Boxborough, MA	Maradith Feinberg; Craig Maurizi	Maria Lako; Michael Blicharski	Elaine Asanakis; Christopher Hefner	No pewter medals awarded	
1987	Alexandria, VA	Gillian Wachsman; Todd Waggoner	Karen Courtland; Joshua Roberts	Elaine Asanakis; Christopher Hefner	Calla Urbanski; Michael Blicharski	
1988	Morristown, NJ	Calla Urbanski; Michael Blicharski	Ginger Tse; Archie Tse	Maria Lako; Rocky Marval	Karen Courtland; David Goodman	
1989	Darien, CT	Calla Urbanski; Mark Naylor	Maria Lako; Rocky Marval	Ginger Tse; Archie Tse	Wendy Lee Weston; Alexander Enzmann	
1990	Mt. Lebanon, PA	Calla Urbanski; Mark Naylor	Karen Courtland; David Goodman	Maria Lako; Rocky Marval	No other competitors	
1991	Geneseo, NY	Calla Urbanski; Rocky Marval	Laura Murphy; Brian Wells	Laura Lynn La Barca; Kenneth Benson	Wendy Lee Weston; Alexander Enzmann	
1992	Bridgeport, CT	Karen Courtland; Todd Reynolds	Kara Paxton; Brad Cox	No other competitors		
1993	Newark, DE	Karen Courtland; Todd Reynolds	Katie Wood; Joel McKeever	Aimee Offner; Brad Cox	Tristan Colell; Brad Helgenberg	
1994	West Orange, NJ	Calla Urbanski; Joe Mero	Kyoko Ina; Jason Dungjen	Robin Heckler; Jeffrey Tilley	Natasha Kuchiki; Rocky Marval	
1995	Fitchburg, MA	Nicole Bateson-Rock; Keith Tindall	Aimee Offner; Brad Cox	Stephanie Woodman; Jeff Myers	No other competitors	
1996	Alexandria, VA	Melanie Lambert; Fred Palascak	Nicole Bateson-Rock; Keith Tindall	Sara Ward; Lance Travis	Lauren Weldon; Jason Corley	
1997	Hicksville, NY	Ingrid Goldberg; Jeffrey Tilley	Melanie Lambert; Fred Palascak	Tristen Vega; J. Paul Binnebose	No other competitors	
1998	Simsbury, CT	Laura Handy; J. Paul Binnebose	Tiffany Scott; Philip Dulebohn	Sara Ward; Bert Cording	Christie Moxley; Jeffrey Weiss	
1999	Oldsmar, FL	Tiffany Scott; Philip Dulebohn	Tiffany Sfikas; Bert Cording	No other competitors		
2000	No competition held					
2001	Marlborough, MA	Laura Handy; Jonathon Hunt	Stephanie Woodman; James Peterson	Po Hayes; Richard Gillam	No other competitors	
2002	Pittsburgh, PA	Kathryn Orscher; Garrett Lucash	Marcy Hinzmann; Ronnie Biancosino	No other competitors		
2003	Aston, PA	Jennifer Don; Jonathon Hunt	Laura Handy; Jeremy Allen	Amanda Evora; Mark Ladwig	Stacey Pensgen; Derek Trent	
2004	Lake Placid, NY	Laura Handy; Jeremy Allen	Emma Phibbs; Michael McPherson	Colette Appel; Lee Harris	No other competitors	
2005	Boxborough, MA	Amanda Evora; Mark Ladwig	Colette Appel; Lee Harris	Shantel Jordan; Jeremy Barrett	Katie Beriau; Joseph Gazzola	
2006	Bethlehem, PA	Tiffany Scott; Rusty Fein	Shantel Jordan; Jeremy Barrett	Colette Appel; Lee Harris	Chloé Katz; Joseph Lynch	
2007	Alpharetta, GA	Amanda Evora; Mark Ladwig	Chloé Katz; Joseph Lynch	Shantel Jordan; Steven Elefante	No other competitors	
2008	Raleigh, NC	Kaela Pflumm; Christopher Pottenger	Chloé Katz; Joseph Lynch	No other competitors		
2009	Boston, MA	Caydee Denney; Jeremy Barrett	Chloé Katz; Joseph Lynch	Jessica Rose Paetsch; Drew Meekins	No other competitors	
2010	Newark, DE	Marissa Castelli; Simon Shnapir	Tracy Tanovich; Michael Chau	No other competitors		
2011	Aston, PA	Erika Smith; Nathan Bartholomay	Chloé Katz; Joseph Lynch	Alexa Scimeca; Ivan Dimitrov	Gretchen Donlan; Andrew Speroff	
2012	Jamestown, NY	Gretchen Donlan; Andrew Speroff	Felicia Zhang; Nathan Bartholomay	Kloe Chanel Bautista; Tyler Harris	Alexa Scimeca; Ivan Dimitrov	
2013	Hyannis, MA	Tarah Kayne; Daniel O'Shea	Felicia Zhang; Nathan Bartholomay	No other competitors		
2014	No competition held					
2015	Wake Forest, NC	Marissa Castelli; Mervin Tran	Alexandria Shaughnessy; James Morgan	No other competitors		
2016	Simsbury, CT	Marissa Castelli; Mervin Tran	Alexandria Shaughnessy; James Morgan	Cali Fujimoto; Nicholas Barsi-Rhyne	No other competitors	
2017	Indian Trail, NC	Deanna Stellato-Dudek; Nathan Bartholomay	Joy Weinberg; Maximiliano Fernandez	Alexandria Shaughnessy; James Morgan	No other competitors	
2018	Boxborough, MA	Allison Timlen; Justin Highgate-Brutman	Jade Esposito; Rique Newby-Estrella	No other competitors		
2019	Wake Forest, NC	Allison Timlen; Justin Highgate-Brutman	No other competitors			
2020	No competitors completed the free skate segment					
2021-2022	No competition held due to the COVID-19 pandemic					
2023-2024	No competition held					
2025	Boston, MA	Ellie Korytek; Timmy Chapman	Sydney Cooke; Matthew Kennedy	Evelyn Grace Hanns; Danny Neudecker	No other competitors	
2026	No competition held					

=== Ice dance ===
Season	Location	Gold	Silver	Bronze	Pewter	Details
1941	Rye, NY	Roberta Betjeman; Edward Berkson	Edith Whetstone; Al Richards Jr.	Mrs. Howard Wilkinson; Howard Wilkinson	No pewter medals awarded	
1942	New York, NY	Edith Whetstone; Al Richards Jr.	Gertrude Meredith; Harold Hartshorne	Nettie Prantel Meier; Joseph K. Savage	No pewter medals awarded	
1943	New Haven, CT	Doris Schubach; Walter Noffke	Mary McLaughlin; Jack Andresen	Elisabeth Dripps; Jacob J. Kohlhas	No pewter medals awarded	
1944	Lake Placid, NY	Mary Andersen; Jack Andresen	Nettie Prantel Meier; Harold Hartshorne	Elisabeth H. Daub; William O. Hickok IV	No pewter medals awarded	
1945	Boston, MA	Kathe Mehl Williams; Robert J. Swenning	Anne Davies; Carleton Hoffner Jr.	Doris Schubach; Walter Noffke	No pewter medals awarded	
1946	Baltimore, MD	Anne Davies; Carleton Hoffner Jr.	Patsy Jones; Walter Bainbridge	Vivian Halliday; Richard C. Queisser	No pewter medals awarded	
1947	Ardmore, PA	Anne Davies; Carleton Hoffner Jr.	Lois Waring; Walter Bainbridge Jr.	Vivian Halliday; Richard C. Queisser	No pewter medals awarded	
1948	Lake Placid, NY	Phyllis Schroeder; Samuel Stokes Jr.	Vivian Halliday; Edward Picken	Carolyn Hinrichs; Donald Wilson	No pewter medals awarded	
1949	Boston, MA	Lois Waring; Walter Bainbridge Jr.	Irene Maguire; Walter Muehlbronner	Phyllis Schroeder; Samuel Stokes Jr.	No pewter medals awarded	
1950	Rye, NY	Irene Maguire; Walter Muehlbronner	Vera Ruth Elliot; Rex Cook	No other competitors	No pewter medals awarded	
1951	Troy, NY	Virginia Hoyns; Donald Jacoby	Carol Ann Peters; Danny Ryan	No other competitors	No pewter medals awarded	
1952	Troy, NY	Lois Waring; Michael McGean	Carol Ann Peters; Danny Ryan	Virginia Hoyns; Donald Jacoby	No pewter medals awarded	
1953-1954	No competition held				No pewter medals awarded	
1955	Princeton, NJ	Phyllis Forney; Martin Forney	Virginia Hoyns; Bill Kipp	Sidney Foster; Franklin Nelson	No pewter medals awarded	
1956	No competition held				No pewter medals awarded	
1957	Hershey, PA	Andree Anderson; Donald Jacoby	No other competitors		No pewter medals awarded	
1958	Troy, NY	Andree Anderson; Donald Jacoby	No other competitors		No pewter medals awarded	
1959	Rye, NY	Andree Anderson; Donald Jacoby	Judy Lamar; Ron Ludington	No other competitors	No pewter medals awarded	
1960	No competition held				No pewter medals awarded	
1961	West Orange, NJ	Patricia Dineen; Robert Dineen	Katrine Neil; Peter Betts	No other competitors	No pewter medals awarded	
1962	No competition held				No pewter medals awarded	
1963	Ardmore, PA	Sally Schantz; Stanley Urban	Connie Caracciola; David Owen	No other competitors	No pewter medals awarded	
1964	No competition held				No pewter medals awarded	
1965	Boston, MA	Susan Urban; Stanley Urban	Wilma Piper; Thomas Easton	Peggy Eastman; Richard Hirsch	No pewter medals awarded	
1966	Hershey, PA	Judy Schwomeyer; James Sladky	Wilma Piper; Thomas Easton	Dale Lynne; Russell Bowen	No pewter medals awarded	
1967	Buffalo, NY	Judy Schwomeyer; James Sladky	Dolly Rodenbaugh; Thomas Lescinski	Dianne Tyler; Bruce Tyler	No pewter medals awarded	
1968	South Weymouth, MA	Anne Millier; Harvey Millier	Debbi Gerken; Raymond Tiedemann	Dianne Tyler; Bruce Tyler	No pewter medals awarded	
1969	Wilmington, DE	Anne Millier; Harvey Millier	Dianne Tyler; Bruce Tyler	Cherie Lynne; Donald Bachlott	No pewter medals awarded	
1970	Philadelphia, PA	Anne Millier; Harvey Millier	Dianne Tyler; Bruce Tyler	Candace Johnstone; Bruce Bowland	No pewter medals awarded	
1971	Boston, MA	Jane Pankey; Richard Horne	Debbi Gerken; Peter Bilous	Victoria Pedu; Roger Bennett	No pewter medals awarded	
1972	Hershey, PA	Jane Pankey; Richard Horne	Cathleen Casey; Francis Cassella	Christine Linney; Bruce Bowland	No pewter medals awarded	
1973	Lake Placid, NY	Jane Pankey; Richard Horne	Jane Hickey; Robert Young	Christine Linney; Bruce Bowland	No pewter medals awarded	
1974	Lexington, MA	Judi Genovesi; Kent Weigle	Christine Linney; Bruce Bowland	Susan Kelley; Andrew Stroukoff	No pewter medals awarded	
1975	Ardmore, PA	Judi Genovesi; Kent Weigle	Susan Kelley; Andrew Stroukoff	Jennifer Vogel; David Siebert	No pewter medals awarded	
1976	New York, NY	Susan Kelley; Andrew Stroukoff	Jennifer Vogel; David Siebert	Stacey Smith; John Summers	No pewter medals awarded	
1977	Boston, MA	Susan Kelley; Andrew Stroukoff	Stacey Smith; John Summers	Bonnie Burton; William Burton	No pewter medals awarded	
1978	Philadelphia, PA	Stacey Smith; John Summers	Susan Kelley; Andrew Stroukoff	Hae Sue Park; Patrick Shannon	No pewter medals awarded	
1979	Rochester, NY	Stacey Smith; John Summers	Sheila Corcoran; J.J. Kohlhas Jr.	Judy Ferris; Scott Gregory	No pewter medals awarded	
1980	Danvers, MA	Stacey Smith; John Summers	Susan Dymecki; Anthony Bardin	Hae Sue Park; Patrick Shannon	No pewter medals awarded	
1981	Wilmington, DE	Carol Fox; Richard Dalley	Elisa Spitz; Scott Gregory	Susan Dymecki; Anthony Bardin	No pewter medals awarded	
1982	Morristown, NJ	Carol Fox; Richard Dalley	Elisa Spitz; Scott Gregory	Janice Kindrachuk; Blake Hobson	No pewter medals awarded	
1983	South Yarmouth, MA	Elisa Spitz; Scott Gregory	Susan Jorgensen; Robert Yokabaskas	Eleanor DeVera; James Yorke	No pewter medals awarded	
1984	Philadelphia, PA	Carol Fox; Richard Dalley	Susan Jorgensen; Robert Yokabaskas	Eleanor DeVera; James Yorke	No pewter medals awarded	
1985	Lake Placid, NY	Suzanne Semanick; Scott Gregory	Susan Jorgensen; Robert Yokabaskas	Kristan Lowery; Chip Rossbach	No pewter medals awarded	
1986	Boxborough, MA	Suzanne Semanick; Scott Gregory	Kristan Lowery; Chip Rossbach	Laura Everngam; Jerry Santoferrara	No pewter medals awarded	
1987	Alexandria, VA	Ann Hensel; James Yorke	Beth McLean; Ari Lieb	Laura Everngam; Jerry Santoferrara	No other competitors	
1988	Morristown, NJ	Renée Roca; James Yorke	Beth McLean; Ari Lieb	Ann Hensel; Ron Kravette	Lisa Grove; Scott Myers	
1989	Darien, CT	Suzanne Semanick; Ron Kravette	Elizabeth McLean; Ari Lieb	Regina Woodward; Charles Sinek	Lisa Grove; Scott Myers	
1990	Mt. Lebanon, PA	Suzanne Semanick; Ron Kravette	Lisa Grove; Scott Myers	Amy Webster; Leif Erickson	Wendy Millette; James Curtis	
1991	Geneseo, NY	Elizabeth McLean; Ron Kravette	Rachel Mayer; Peter Breen	Amy Webster; Leif Erickson	Lisa Grove; Scott Myers	
1992	Bridgeport, CT	Amy Webster; Leif Erickson	Wendy Millette; Jason Tebo	Galit Chait; Max Sevostianov	No other competitors	
1993	Newark, DE	Susan Wynne; Russ Witherby	Galit Chait; Max Sevostianov	Melinda Sweezey; Gary Irving	Brandy Valencia; Gus Dibella	
1994	West Orange, NJ	Wendy Millette; Jason Tebo	Galit Chait; Max Sevostianov	Christine Fitzgerald; Mark Fitzgerald	Melissa Boney; Gerald Miele	
1995	Fitchburg, MA	Amy Webster; Ron Kravette	Christine Fitzgerald; Mark Fitzgerald	Laura Gayton; Oleg Fediukov	No other competitors	
1996	Alexandria, VA	Amy Webster; Ron Kravette	Laura Gayton; Oleg Fediukov	Cheryl Demkowski; Greg Maddalone	Leslie Soderberg; David Lipowitz	
1997	Hicksville, NY	Amy Webster; Ron Kravette	Debbie Koegel; Oleg Fediukov	Cheryl Demkowski; Greg Maddalone	Tami Tyler; Jonathan Nichols	
1998	Simsbury, CT	Leslie Soderberg; David Lipowitz	Julia Bikbova; John Lee	Jayna Cronin; Yovanny Durango	Rebecca DeWitt; Marc Fenczak	
1999	Oldsmar, FL	Christie Moxley; Tom Gaasbeck	Debbie Koegel; Oleg Fediukov	No other competitors		
2000	West Orange, NJ	Alison Newman; Dmitri Boundoukin	Jamie Katz; Vasilij Serkov	Elizabeth Curtiss; Vincent Van Vliet	No other competitors	
2001-2002	No competition held					
2003	Aston, PA	Emilie Nussear; Mathew Gates	Loren Galler-Rabinowitz; David Mitchell	Christie Moxley; Aleksandre Kirsanov	Lydia Manon; Vitaliy Shalin	
2004	No competition held					
2005	Boxborough, MA	Julia Rey; Philipp Rey	Kate Slattery; C.G. Lee	Lindsay Evans; Kevin O'Keefe	Francesca Cheli; Alex Clark	
2006	Bethlehem, PA	Kimberly Navarro; Brent Bommentre	Kate Slattery; C.G. Lee	Elizabeth Palmer; Jonathan Toman	No other competitors	
2007	Alpharetta, GA	Clare Farrell; Charles Fishpaw	Kate Slattery; C.G. Lee	Isabel Elliman; Dmitriy Serebrenik	No other competitors	
2008	Raleigh, NC	Elizabeth Miosi; Dmitry Ponomarev	Marsha Snyder; Peter Fischl	No other competitors		
2009	Boston, MA	Morgan Matthews; Leif Gislason	Clare Farrell; Charles Fishpaw	Lauren Corry; Alexander Lorello	No other competitors	
2010	Newark, DE	Lauren Corry; Alexander Lorello	Katie Wyble; Justin Morrow	Grace Cho; Dmitry Ponomarev	No other competitors	
2011	Aston, PA	Ginna Hoptman; Pavel Filchenkov	Meredith Zuber; Kyle Herring	Katharine Zeigler; Baxter Burbank	Katherine Pilgrim; Alexander Lorello	
2012	Jamestown, NY	Isabella Cannuscio; Ian Lorello	Anastasia Cannuscio; Colin McManus	Ginna Hoptman; Pavel Filchenkov	Meredith Zuber; Kyle Herring	
2013	Hyannis, MA	Isabella Cannuscio; Michael Bramante	Anastasia Cannuscio; Colin McManus	Ginna Hoptman; Pavel Filchenkov	Danielle Gamelin; Alexander Gamelin	
2014	Ashburn, VA	Ginna Hoptman; Pavel Filchenkov	Isabella Cannuscio; Michael Bramante	Danielle Gamelin; Alexander Gamelin	Elicia Reynolds; Stephen Reynolds	
2015	Wake Forest, NC	Danielle Gamelin; Alexander Gamelin	Ginna Hoptman; Pavel Filchenkov	Elicia Reynolds; Stephen Reynolds	No other competitors	
2016	Simsbury, CT	Charlotte Maxwell; Ryan Devereaux	Elicia Reynolds; Stephen Reynolds	Gabriela Morrell Zucker; Andrejs Sitiks	No other competitors	
2017	Indian Trail, NC	Julia Biechler; Damian Dodge	Elicia Reynolds; Stephen Reynolds	Cassidy Klopstock; Jacob Schedl	No other competitors	
2018	Boxborough, MA	Julia Biechler; Damian Dodge	Elicia Reynolds; Stephen Reynolds	No other competitors		
2019	No competition held					
2020	Hyannis, MA	Eva Pate; Logan Bye	Livvy Shilling; Alexander Petrov	Bailey Melton; Ryan O'Donnell	No other competitors	
2021-2022	No competition held due to the COVID-19 pandemic					
2023 (Note: Beginning in 2020, the ice dance sectional competition was renamed the U.S. Ice Dance Final and held alongside a single's sectional championship.)	Norwood, MA	Emilea Zingas; Vadym Kolesnik	Isabella Flores; Ivan Desyatov	Angela Ling; Caleb Wein	Raffaella Koncius; Alexey Shchepetov	
2024-2026	No competition held					

== Junior medalists ==
=== Men ===
Season	Location	Gold	Silver	Bronze	Pewter	Details
2011	Aston, PA	Alexander Zahradnicek	Alexander Aiken	Emmanuel Savary	Harrison Choate	
2012	Jamestown, NY	Harrison Choate	Timothy Dolensky	Emmanuel Savary	Andrew Nagode	
2013	Hyannis, MA	Jay Yostanto	Jimmy Ma	James Schetelich	Marcus Mimidis	
2014	Ashburn, VA	Jimmy Ma	Tony Lu	James Schetelich	Ben Jalovick	
2015	Wake Forest, NC	Andrew Torgashev	Oleksiy Melnyk	Tony Lu	Ben Jalovick	
2016	Simsbury, CT	Kevin Shum	Oleksiy Melnyk	Tony Lu	Yamato Rowe	
2017	Indian Trail, NC	William Hubbart	Ryan Dunk	Peter Liu	TJ Nyman	
2018	Boxborough, MA	Maxim Naumov	Ryan Dunk	Peter Liu	Tony Lu	
2019	Wake Forest, NC	Peter Liu	Ryan Dunk	Joseph Kang	Lucas Altieri	
2020	Hyannis, MA	Maxim Naumov	Ilia Malinin	Lucas Altieri	Joseph Kang	
2021- 2022	No competition held					
2023	Norwood, MA	Robert Yampolsky	Lucius Kazanecki	Kirk Haugeto	Jacob Sanchez	
2024	Coral Springs, FL	Lucius Kazanecki	Kirk Haugeto	Aleksandr Fegan	Jared Sedlis	
2025	Boston, MA	Aleksandr Fegan	Jared Sedlis	Patrick Blackwell	Kirk Hagueto	
2026	North Charleston, SC	Patrick Blackwell	Caleb Farrington	Aleksandr Fegan	Zachary LoPinto	

=== Women ===
Season	Location	Gold	Silver	Bronze	Pewter	Details
2011	Aston, PA	Allison Timlen	Hayley Dunne	Elise Eng	Nicole Rajic	
2012	Jamestown, NY	Nicole Rajic	Allison Timlen	Jessica Hu	Jenelle Herman	
2013	Hyannis, MA	Maria Yang	Madison Vinci	Olivia Serafini	Brianna Laxson	
2014	Ashburn, VA	Olivia Serafini	Megan Wessenberg	Lyra Katzman	Maria Yang	
2015	Wake Forest, NC	Olivia Serafini	Brynne McIsaac	Rebecca Peng	Brianna Brazee	
2016	Simsbury, CT	Rebecca Peng	Brynne McIsaac	Megan Wessenberg	Carly Berrios	
2017	Indian Trail, NC	Alexia Paganini	Emmy Ma	Brynne McIsaac	Haley Beavers	
2018	Boxborough, MA	Ting Cui	Audrey Shin	Gabriella Izzo	Emily Zhang	
2019	Wake Forest, NC	Gabriella Izzo	Audrey Shin	Emily Zhang	Sarah Jung	
2020	Hyannis, MA	Lindsay Thorngren	Mia Eckels	Mauryn Tyack	Lara Annunziata	
2021- 2022	No competition held					
2023	Norwood, MA	Mia Barghout	Katie Krafchik	Sarah Everhardt	Krystal Edwards	
2024	Coral Springs, FL	Sofia Bezkorovainaya	Maria Platonova	Sophie Joline von Felten	Ela Cui	
2025	Boston, MA	Sophie Joline Von Felten	Sofia Bezkorovainaya	Skylar Lautowa-Peguero	Maria Platonova	
2026	North Charleston, SC	Madison Chong	Kaya Tiernan	Mia Iwase	Sofia Bezkorovainaya	

=== Pairs ===
Season	Location	Gold	Silver	Bronze	Pewter	Details
2011	Aston, PA	Morgan Sowa / David Leenen	Kylie Duarte / Colin Grafton	Haven Denney / Daniel Raad	Kloe Chanel Bautista / Tyler Harris	
2012	Jamestown, NY	Christine Mozer / Daniel O'Shea	Kylie Duarte / Colin Grafton	Audrey Goldberg / Joseph Dolkiewicz	Cali Fujimoto / Nicholas Barsi-Rhyne	
2013	Hyannis, MA	Olivia Oltmanns / Joshua Santillan	Alexandria Shaughnessy / James Morgan	Cali Fujimoto / Nicholas Barsi-Rhyne	Caitlin Belt / Michael Johnson	
2014	No competition held					
2015	Wake Forest, NC	Cirinia Gillett / Maximiliano Fernandez	Joy Weinberg / Michael Lueck	Alyssa McDougal / Paul Schatz	Gabriella Marvaldi / Cody Dolkiewicz	
2016	Simsbury, CT	Joy Weinberg / Maximiliano Fernandez	Sarah Rose / Joseph Goodpaster	Gabriella Marvaldi / Cody Dolkiewicz	Cirinia Gillett / Jason Pacini	
2017	Indian Trail, NC	Gabriella Marvaldi / Daniel Villeneuve	Elli Kopmar / Jonah Barrett	Sarah Rose / Joseph Goodpaster	Kate Finster / Brandon Kozlowski	
2018	Boxborough, MA	Nadine Wang / Spencer Howe	Sarah Rose / Ian Meyh	No other competitors		
2019	Wake Forest, NC	Grace Knoop / Blake Eisenach	Sarah Rose / Jim Garbutt	Jade Hom / Franz-Peter Jerosch	No other competitors	
2020 (Note: Beginning in 2020, the pairs sectional competition was renamed the U.S. Pairs Final and held alongside a single's sectional championship.)	Aston, PA	Evelyn Grace Hanns / Jim Garbutt	Cate Fleming / Jedidiah Isbell	Arianna Varvoutis / Derrick Griffin	Analise Gonzalez / Franz-Peter Jerosch	
2021- 2024	No competition held					
2025	Boston, MA	Elizabeth Hansen / William Church	Reagan Moss / Jakub Galbavy	Addyson McDanold / Aaron Felberbaum	Sofia Jarmoc / Luke Witkowski	
2026	No competition held					

=== Ice Dance ===
Season	Location	Gold	Silver	Bronze	Pewter	Details
2011	Aston, PA	Lauri Bonacorsi / Travis Mager	Anastasia Cannuscio / Colin McManus	Danielle Gamelin / Alexander Gamelin	Danvi Pham / Vu Pham	
2012	Jamestown, NY	Lauri Bonacorsi / Travis Mager	Rachel Parsons / Michael Parsons	Lorraine McNamara / Quinn Carpenter	Danielle Gamelin / Alexander Gamelin	
2013	Hyannis, MA	Lorraine McNamara / Quinn Carpenter	Rachel Parsons / Michael Parsons	Elliana Pogrebinsky / Ross Gudis	Whitney Miller / Kyle MacMillan	
2014	Ashburn, VA	Julia Biechler / Damian Dodge	Elliana Pogrebinsky / Ross Gudis	Marcha Kiatrungrit / Bradley Lawrence	No other competitors	
2015	Wake Forest, NC	Lorraine McNamara / Quinn Carpenter	Rachel Parsons / Michael Parsons	Julia Biechler / Damian Dodge	Gigi Becker / Luca Becker	
2016	Simsbury, CT	Julia Biechler / Damian Dodge	Gigi Becker / Luca Becker	Lydia Erdman / Alexey Shchepetov	Rebecca Lucas / Jason Schedl	
2017	Indian Trail, NC	Caroline Green / Gordon Green	Emma Gunter / Caleb Wein	Eliana Gropman / Ian Somerville	Chloe Lewis / Logan Bye	
2018	Boxborough, MA	Caroline Green / Gordon Green	Eliana Gropman / Ian Somerville	Emma Gunter / Caleb Wein	Allie Rose / J.T. Michel	
2019	Wake Forest, NC	Caroline Green / Gordon Green	Oona Brown / Gage Brown	No other competitors		
2020	Hyannis, MA	Katarina Wolfkostin / Jeffrey Chen	Molly Cesanek / Yehor Yehorov	Katarina DelCamp / Ian Somerville	Oona Brown / Gage Brown	
2021- 2022	No competition held					
2023	Norwood, MA	Leah Neset / Artem Markelov	Helena Carhart / Volodymyr Horovyi	Jenna Hauer / Benjamin Starr	Vanessa Pham / Jonathan Rogers	
2024- 2026	No competition held					

== Records ==
Records
Discipline	Most championship titles		
Discipline	Skater(s)	No.	Years
Men's singles	Marlon Bradley	4	1975-78
Men's singles	Michael Chack	4	1991-93; 1995
Men's singles	Scott Hamilton	4	1980-82; 1984
Men's singles	W. Patrick Lalor	4	1966-67; 1969-70
Women's singles	Elaine Zayak	5	1980-84
Women's singles	Priscilla Hill	4	1974; 1976-79
Pairs	Calla Urbanski (Note: Calla Urbanski won one championship title while partnered with Michael Blicharski (1988), two with Mark Naylor (1989-90), one with Rocky Marval (1991), and one with Joe Mero (1994).)	5	1988-91; 1994
Ice dance	Ron Kravette (Note: Ron Kravette won two championship titles while partnered with Suzanne Semanick (1989-90), one with Elizabeth McLean (1991), and three with Amy Webster (1995-97).)	5	1989-91; 19895-98
