= 1949 U.S. Figure Skating Championships =

Figure skating competition

- Type: National championships
- Date: April 6 – 9
- Season: 1948–49
- Location: Colorado Springs, Colorado
- Host: Broadmoor Skating Club
- Venue: Broadmoor Ice Palace

Champions
- Men's singles: Richard Button (Senior) & Richard Dwyer (Junior)
- Women's singles: Yvonne Sherman (Senior) & Sonya Klopfer (Junior)
- Pairs: Karol Kennedy and Peter Kennedy (Senior) & Lois Waring and Walter Bainbridge Jr. (Junior)
- Ice dance: Lois Waring and Walter Bainbridge Jr. (Senior) & Vera Ruth Elliott and Rex Cook (Junior)
- Previous: 1948 U.S. Championships
- Next: 1950 U.S. Championships

The 1949 U.S. Figure Skating Championships were held from April 6 to 9 at the Broadmoor Ice Palace in Colorado Springs, Colorado. Gold, silver, and bronze medals were awarded in men's singles, women's singles, pair skating, and ice dance at the senior, junior, and novice levels.

== Senior results ==
=== Men's singles ===
Men's results
Rank	Skater
1st place, gold medalist(s)	Richard Button
2nd place, silver medalist(s)	James Grogan
3rd place, bronze medalist(s)	Hayes Alan Jenkins
4	G. Austin Holt

=== Women's singles ===
Women's results
Rank	Skater
1st place, gold medalist(s)	Yvonne Sherman
2nd place, silver medalist(s)	Gretchen Van Zandt Merrill
3rd place, bronze medalist(s)	Virginia Baxter
4	Andrea McLaughlin
5	Helen Uhl
6	Faris Nourse
WD	Joan Swanston

=== Pairs ===
Pairs' results
Rank	Team
1st place, gold medalist(s)	Karol Kennedy; Peter Kennedy
2nd place, silver medalist(s)	Irene Maguire; Walter Muehlbronner
3rd place, bronze medalist(s)	Anne Davies; Carleton Hoffner Jr.
4	Patsy Hamm; Jack Boyle
5	Nancy Mineard; Charles Brinkman II

=== Ice dance (Gold dance) ===
Ice dance results
Rank	Team
1st place, gold medalist(s)	Lois Waring; Walter Bainbridge Jr.
2nd place, silver medalist(s)	Irene Maguire; Walter Muehlbronner
3rd place, bronze medalist(s)	Carmel Bodel; Edward Bodel
4	Eleanor Bucher; Ray Hanna

== Junior results ==
=== Men's singles ===
Men's results
Rank	Skater
1st place, gold medalist(s)	Richard Dwyer
2nd place, silver medalist(s)	Donald Jacoby
3rd place, bronze medalist(s)	Dudley Richards
4	Evy Scotvold II
5	Robert Simmonds
6	Barry Gorman
7	Charles Brinkman II
8	Carleton Hoffner Jr.
9	Donald Laws
10	Marlyn Thomsen
11	Walter Bainbridge Jr.

=== Women's singles ===
Women's results
Rank	Skater
1st place, gold medalist(s)	Sonya Klopfer
2nd place, silver medalist(s)	Margaret Anne Graham
3rd place, bronze medalist(s)	Gloria Peterson
4	Josephine Barnum
5	Helen Geekie
6	Janet Gerhauser
7	Lois Secreto
8	Slavka Kohout
9	Jeri Boone
10	Frances Dorsey
11	Mimi Pong
12	Eleanor Levorsen

=== Pairs ===
Pairs' results
Rank	Team
1st place, gold medalist(s)	Lois Waring; Walter Bainbridge Jr.
2nd place, silver medalist(s)	Janet Gerhauser; John Nightingale
3rd place, bronze medalist(s)	Mary Louisa Haas; Jack Woodstrom
4	Lucille Ash; Carl Chamberlin Jr.
5	Sharon Choate; Richard Bromley
6	Patricia Quick; Armando Rodriguez
7	Lucille Mohrey; Roy Miller
8	Gloria Howley; William Lofgren
9	Renee Clark; William Lang
10	Anne Marie Leddy; John Leddy

=== Ice dance (Silver dance) ===
Ice dance results
Rank	Team
1st place, gold medalist(s)	Vera Ruth Elliott; Rex Cook
2nd place, silver medalist(s)	Vera Halliday; Edward Picken
3rd place, bronze medalist(s)	Carol Ann Peters; Daniel Ryan
4	Joann Kelley; Roland Junso
5	Jean Beach; Bruce Hannah
6	Sharon Choate; Richard Bromley
7	Gloria Howley; William Lofgren
8	Carla-Lee Conti; Erik Bruun
9	Mary Louisa Haas; Jack Woodstrom
