= 1981 U.S. Figure Skating Championships =

Figure skating competition

- Type: National Championship
- Date: February
- Season: 1980–81
- Location: San Diego, California
- Previous: 1980 U.S. Championships
- Next: 1982 U.S. Championships

The 1981 U.S. Figure Skating Championships took place in San Diego, California. Medals were awarded in three colors: gold (first), silver (second), and bronze (third) in four disciplines – men's singles, ladies' singles, pair skating, and ice dancing – across three levels: senior, junior, and novice.

The event determined the U.S. team for the 1981 World Championships.

== Senior results ==
=== Men ===
Rank	Name	CF	SP	FS
1	Scott Hamilton	1		
2	David Santee	2		
3	Robert Wagenhoffer			
4	Brian Boitano			

=== Ladies ===
Rank	Name	CF	SP	FS
1	Elaine Zayak	2		
2	Priscilla Hill	1		
3	Lisa-Marie Allen	3		
4	Vikki de Vries	4		
5	Rosalynn Sumners	8		
6	Jackie Farrell	6		
7	Lynn Smith	7		
8	Kristy Hogan	9		
9	Melissa Thomas			
10	Stephanie Anderson	10		

=== Pairs ===
Rank	Name	SP	FS
1	Kitty Carruthers / Peter Carruthers		
2	Lee Ann Miller / William Fauver		
3	Beth Flora / Ken Flora		
4	Vicki Heasley / Peter Oppegard		

=== Ice dancing ===
Rank	Name	CD	OD	FD
1	Judy Blumberg / Michael Seibert			
2	Carol Fox / Richard Dalley			
3	Kim Krohn / Barry Hagan			
4	Elisa Spitz / Scott Gregory			
5	Nancy Berghoff / James Bowser			
6	Ellen Pulver / Donald Adair			
7	Susan Dymecki / Anthony Bardin			
8	Robi Shepherd / Kelly Witt			
9	Cathleen Marron / Jay Pinkerton			
10	Janice Kindrachuk / Blake Hobson			

== Junior results ==
=== Men ===
Rank	Name	CF	SP	FS
1	Paul Wylie	4		
2	John Filbig			
3	James Cygan			

=== Ladies ===
Rank	Name	CF	SP	FS
1	Jill Frost			1
2	Kelly Webster			3
3	Jennifer Newman			2

=== Pairs ===
Rank	Name	SP	FS
1	Deborah Lynch / Keith Green		2
2	Cara Gill / Craig Gill		1
3	Natalie Seybold / Wayne Seybold		

=== Ice dancing ===
Rank	Name	CD	OD	FD
1	Anne Spiewak / Keith Lichtman	1	1	1
2	Susie Wynne / Joseph Druar		2	2
3	Kelleigh Perot / Ralph Ball			4
4	Sandra Fabrocini / James Yorke			3
5	Lynn Smith / Russ Witherby	5		5
6	Lynda Malek / Alexander Miller			7
7	Michelle Dornan / David McInally			6
8	Kimberly Hasler / David Purves			8
9	Andrea Curtis / Michael Curtis			9
