= Millier =

Millier is a surname. Notable people with the surname include:

- Anne Millier, American ice dancer
- Arthur Millier (c. 1894–1975), British-born American painter, etcher, and art critic
- Harvey Millier, American ice dancer, brother of Anne

== See also ==
- Tonne
