= Dymecki =

Dymecki (Polish feminine: Dymecka; plural: Dymeccy) is a surname. Notable people with the surname include:

- Dobromir Dymecki (born 1985), Polish actor
- Susan Dymecki (born 1960), American geneticist and neuroscientist
