= Carolyn Rodriguez =

Carolyn Rodriguez, may refer to:

- Carolyn I. Rodriguez, Puerto Rican scientist and researcher
- Carolyn Jane Rodriguez, Minnesotan politician
