= Allen Schramm =

American figure skater

Personal information
- Born: c. 1961 (age 64–65)

Figure skating career
- Country: United States
- Coach: Peter Dunfield
- Skating club: Skating Club of New York

Allen Schramm (born c. 1961) is an American former competitive figure skater. He is the 1978 Nebelhorn Trophy champion, 1978 Grand Prix International St. Gervais champion, 1979 Prague Skate silver medalist, and 1980 NHK Trophy bronze medalist.

He is the son of Ray Schramm, who skated for Ice Follies with his twin brother, Roy. Originally from San Francisco, Allen Schramm was coached by Peter Dunfield at New York's Sky Rink and represented the Skating Club of New York. He and his wife, Angela Schramm (Greenhow), coached at the Detroit Skating Club in Bloomfield Hills, Michigan until moving to Texas after 2002. They now work at the Stars Figure Skating Club of Texas.

== Competitive highlights ==
International
Event	1975-76	1978–79	1979–80	1980–81
Nebelhorn Trophy		1st		
NHK Trophy				3rd
Prague Skate			2nd	
St. Gervais		1st		
National
U.S. Championships	4th J	7th	10th	
Eastern Sectionals		1st		
J = Junior
