= Konstantin Kostin (figure skater) =

Latvian figure skater

Personal information
- Full name: Konstantin Kostin
- Other names: Konstantīns Kostins
- Born: 4 September 1973 (age 52) Riga
- Height: 1.70 m (5 ft 7 in)

Figure skating career
- Country: Latvia (1992–2001); Soviet Union (through 1991)

Konstantin V. Kostin (Russian: Константин Костин, Latvian: Konstantīns Kostins; born 4 September 1973) is a Latvian figure skater. He competed for the Soviet Union through 1991 and then for Latvia from 1992 to the end of his career in 2001. He is the 1992 World Junior silver medalist and 1992 Karl Schäfer Memorial bronze medalist.

== Personal life ==
Kostin was born on 4 September 1973 in Riga, Latvia. He studied psychology in Russia at the Moscow Sociological Institute.

== Career ==
=== Competitive ===
Early in his career, Kostin represented the Soviet Union. He won the silver medal at the 1992 World Junior Championships, held in late 1991 in Hull, Canada.

He first competed for Latvia in January 1992, placing 9th at the European Championships in Lausanne, Switzerland. In February, he placed 20th at the 1992 Winter Olympics in Albertville, France. At the start of the following season, he was awarded the bronze medal at the 1992 Karl Schäfer Memorial.

Kostin's highest continental placement was 4th, which he achieved at the 1993 European Championships in Helsinki, Finland. His highest placement at the World Figure Skating Championships was 13th, in that same year. He competed at five World Championships (1992, 1993, 1997, 2000 and 2001).

Kostin finished 8th at his sole Grand Prix event, the 2000 Trophée Lalique.

=== Post-competitive ===
Kostin has served as the director of skating at the Yarmouth Ice Club in Kingston, Massachusetts, and an international technical specialist for Latvia. He coached Michelle Boulos.

== Competitive highlights ==
GP: Grand Prix

International
Event	91–92	92–93	93–94	94–95	95–96	96–97	97–98	98–99	99–00	00–01
Olympics	20th									
Worlds	14th	13th				17th			24th	35th
Europeans	9th	4th								14th
GP Lalique										8th
Inter. de Paris		8th								
NHK Trophy		7th								
Schäfer Memorial		3rd								10th
International: Junior
Junior Worlds	2nd									
Blue Swords	1st J									
National
Latvian Champ.		1st								1st
J = Junior level
