= Amy Webster =

American ice dancer

Amy Webster (born March 3, 1969) is a former American ice dancer. Webster began her skating career in Yarmouth, Maine. With partner Ron Kravette, she won the bronze medal at the United States Figure Skating Championships in 1994 and 1995, and finished fourth in 1993 and 1997. Webster and Kravette won the gold medal at the 1993 United States Olympic Festival in San Antonio, and were the alternate pair for the 1994 Winter Olympics in Lillehammer. She turned professional in July 1997 and later appeared in Champions on Ice events.

== Competitive highlights ==
GP: Champions Series (Grand Prix)

=== With Kravette ===
International
Event	92–93	93–94	94–95	95–96	96–97
GP Nations Cup				10th	
GP Skate America					11th
Piruetten	4th				
Skate Canada		9th			
National
U.S. Championships	4th	3rd	3rd	5th	4th
Eastern Sectionals			1st	1st	1st

=== With Erickson ===
International
Event	1989–90	1990–91	1991–92
Skate America		10th	
Schäfer Memorial			1st
National
U.S. Championships	8th	5th	5th
Eastern Sectionals			1st

=== With Millier ===
National
Event	1984–85	1985–86
U.S. Championships	7th J	WD J
J = Junior level; WD = Withdrew
