= Carolyn I. Rodriguez =

Puerto Rican psychiatrist

Carolyn Rodriguez
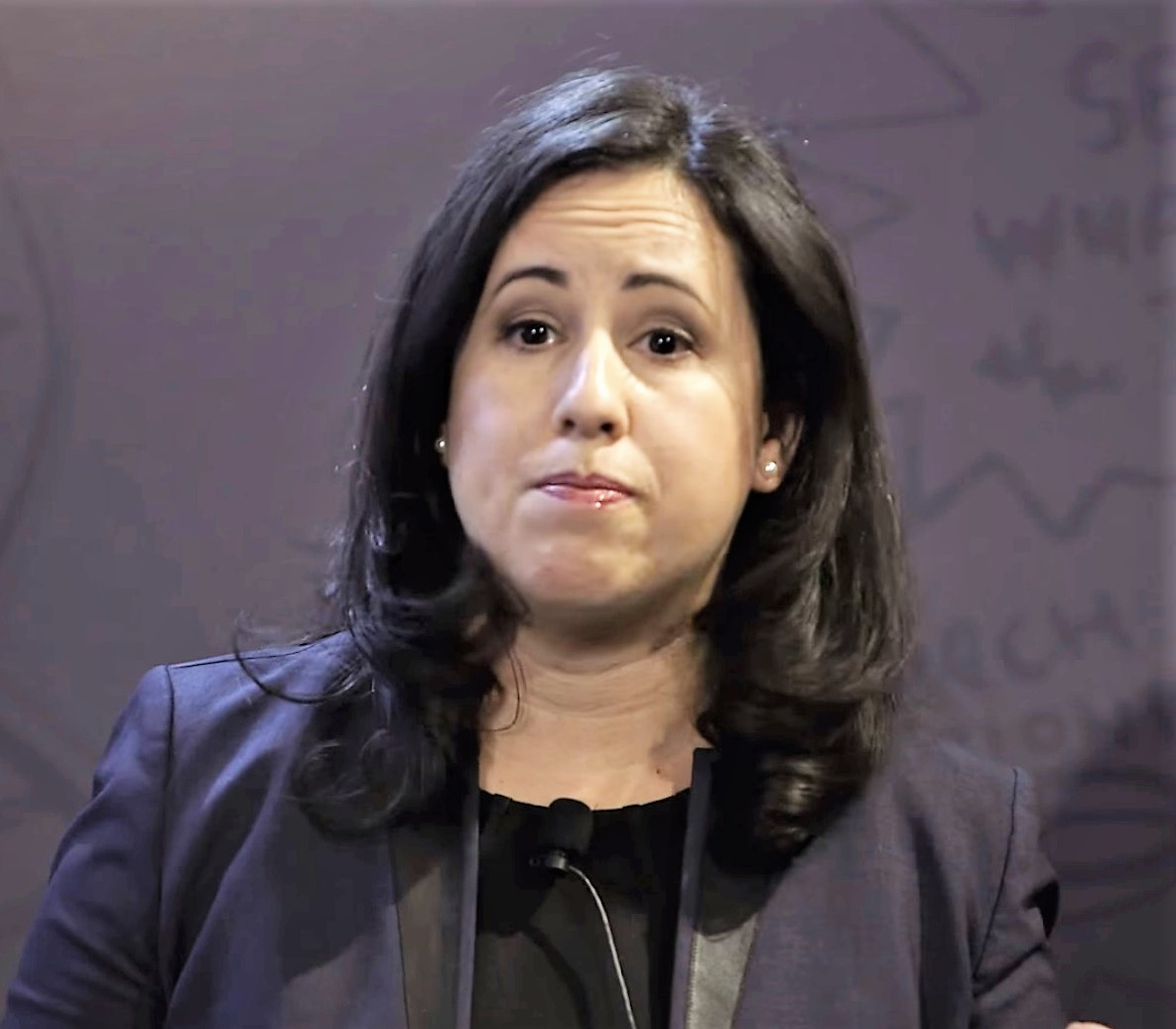
- Rodriguez speaks at the World Economic Forum in 2019
- Born: c. 1981 (age 44–45); San Juan, Puerto Rico
- Education: Harvard University
- Known for: Discovering therapeutic potential of Ketamine in treating OCD
- Scientific career
- Fields: Neuroscience, psychiatry
- Workplaces: Stanford University

Carolyn I. Rodriguez is a Puerto Rican psychiatrist, neuroscientist, and clinical researcher developing treatments for obsessive compulsive disorder as well as mapping circuit dysfunction in the human brain. Rodriguez holds appointments in both clinical and academic departments at Stanford University. Rodriguez is a Clinical Lab Director at the Stanford Center for Cognitive and Neurobiological Imaging, an associate professor and Associate Chair of Psychiatry and Behavioral Sciences, and a Director of several specialized translational research programs.

== Early life and education ==
Rodriguez was born in San Juan, Puerto Rico. She moved to Boston for her undergraduate degree in Computer Science at Harvard University. After graduating in 1996, Rodriguez stayed in Boston to pursue her MD-PhD training within the Harvard-MIT Health Sciences and Technology program where she conducted research in Neuroscience and completed her MD training at Harvard Medical School. During her PhD, Rodriguez was mentored by Susan Dymecki where she developed an innovative genetic technology to map the development of the Precerebellar System in rodents. Her technology has been cited hundreds of times and is now widely used many researchers in neuroscience.

Rodriguez moved to New York City to complete her internship, residency, and postdoctoral training at Columbia University Medical Center-NYSPI. In 2005, Rodriguez completed her Internship in Pediatrics and in 2008, she completed her Residency in both Pediatrics and Psychiatry. Rodriguez narrowed her clinical and research focus towards understanding and treating patients with Obsessive–compulsive disorder. When she first treated a patient with OCD, she was taken aback by how disabling the disease was and she became frustrated by both the lack of treatments and the long time course before existing treatments begin to relieve patients symptoms. She became motivated to help patients with OCD by exploring avenues to innovate treatments that have rapid effects on patients.

Rodriguez continued on to Fellowship training at Columbia under the mentorship of Helen Blair Simpson. Rodriguez explored the rapid therapeutic effects of Ketamine as a treatment for OCD. Rodriguez was recruited to Stanford University in 2015.

=== Tool development for precerebellar afferent system ontogeny ===
During her graduate studies, Rodriguez wanted to test the hypothesis that precerebellar neurons originate from the dorsal neuroepithelium, but she needed a tool to do so. To determine the origins of the precerebellar neurons, Rodriguez developed a genetic tool, using flip-recombinase, that allowed for irreversible fluorescent tagging of descendent cells from a specific progenitor. Applying this tool. Rodriguez localized the origins of the precerebellar neurons to Wnt1 expressing dorsal neural progenitors. She later improved the efficacy of her tool by creating an enhanced version, called FLPe, that had 10 fold improved activity compared to the previous iteration. Using FLPe, Rodriguez was able to determine molecular differences in the primordial cell population that gave rise to unique subsystems of cerebellar cells, suggesting that differentiation may occur even earlier than originally appreciated. Rodriguez's genetic tool development and novel findings were published in Neuron in 2000 and have been cited numerous times due to their utility in neuronal fate mapping.

=== Obsessive-compulsive disorder and hoarding disorder ===
Rodriguez published a case study exploring the difficulty in diagnosing and treating an individual with signs of both OCD and schizophrenia, and she displayed the efficacy of treating OCD with glutamate modulators posing future questions about their longitudinal use in treating OCD.

Rodriguez and her colleagues tested a novel glutamate modulator, minocycline, to assess its potential for relief of OCD symptoms as an alternative to SSRIs. They found that minocycline might ameliorate early onset OCD and improve symptoms of primary hoarding, and their results overall suggest that further studies are warranted to explore minocycline as a therapeutic agent for early-onset OCD. In 2015, Rodriguez published a groundbreaking paper in Neurospychopharmacology highlighting the therapeutic potential of a different glutamate modulating compound, Ketamine, in treating OCD. They found significant decreases in obsessions that lasted for more than one week. Rodriuguez's study was the first randomized controlled trial to show that modulating glutamate signalling could have rapid and long-lasting therapeutic effects for patients with OCD.

Rodriguez also discovered abnormally high rates of Hoarding Disorder (HD) in the population of individuals in New York seeking help from Eviction Intervention Services. Her findings highlighted the potential of treating HD in reducing homelessness in New York and Rodriguez began to explore new and improved treatments for HD. In a case report, she assessed the use of methylphenidate, an amphetamine, in treating HD and it showed improvements in some individuals suggesting further research into applying amphetamine compounds in a clinical setting for HD.

== Career and research ==
In 2015, Rodriguez joined the faculty at Stanford University as an Assistant Professor of Psychiatry and Behavioral Sciences and a member of the Wu Tsai Neurosciences Institute. Rodriguez was also appointed the Director of the Stanford Hoarding Disorders Research Program, the Director of the Translational OCD Research Program, and the Director of the Translational Therapeutics Lab, which is also the Rodriguez Lab. Rodriguez's lab focuses on understanding the neurobiological mechanisms of emotion and behavior in order to develop rapid acting therapeutics for mental illnesses. They focus on drug discovery and participate in clinical trials to test mechanisms and efficacy of their compounds and treatments in the human brain. The main illness that the lab focuses on currently is OCD, they also work on Hoarding Disorder and Posttraumatic Stress Disorder.

Rodriguez also provides clinical mental health care for veterans as a consultation liaison psychiatrist. In 2018, Rodriguez was promoted to Associate Chair of Inclusion and Diversity at Stanford Medical School in the Department of Psychiatry and Behavioral Sciences, and she took on the role of Clinical Lab Director at the Stanford Center for Cognitive and Neurobiological Imaging.

=== Glutamate modulation as a treatment for OCD ===
Following Rodriguez's successful postdoctoral work at Columbia elucidating the therapeutic potential of Ketamine in treating OCD, Rodriguez continued to pursue a further understanding of this therapeutic avenue and ways to improve its efficacy in patients. To assess the neurochemical effects of Ketamine, Rodriguez and her colleagues used proton magnetic resonance spectroscopy. They found that subjects treated with Ketamine had higher GABA levels than controls, and these findings support data showing that patients with OCD have decreased GABAergic activity. Their finding pointed to a novel mechanism of ketamine action and underlying GABA abnormality in patients with OCD.

While Ketamine was effective in ameliorating symptoms, its side effects include nausea and dissociation, so Rodriguez and her colleagues sought to find another glutamate modulatory compound to treat OCD with fewer side effects. They found that Rapastinel, a NMDAR glycine-site partial agonist, showed similar improvements in obsessions associated with OCD while accompanied by fewer side effects compared to ketamine treatment. Though the short term effects were positive, it did not have long lasting effects like ketamine thus calling for further developments in therapeutics.

To explore underlying mechanisms of Ketamine's actions and find ways to reduce the dissociative effects of Ketamine, Rodriguez and her team tested opioid receptor antagonism as a means to reduce dissociations in patients. They surprisingly found that opioid signalling plays an important role in mediating ketamines acute anti-depressant effects but does not seem to play as dominant a role in mediating the dissociative effects.

== Advocacy ==
Rodriguez is a past Chair of the American College of Neuropsychopharmacology Underrepresented Minority Task Force.

Rodriguez also advocates for equity, inclusion, and diversity in science and medicine. She recently co-authored an article in the Harvard Business Review discussing the barriers that women face in medicine and that broader diversity can improve innovative potential. She also helps to outline critical yet simple steps that can be achieved quickly to begin to make changes to improve the numbers of women in leadership positions in medicine and academia.

As a writer for the Huffington Post, Rodriguez has written articles educating the public about the importance of research and how they can get involved in advancing research towards treating and curing mental illnesses like OCD. Her writing has also created an avenue for public awareness of the stages of ketamine research for use in mental illness.

== Awards and honors ==
- 2019 Presidential Early Career Award for Scientists and Engineers (PECASE)
- 2018 Chairman's Annual Award for Excellence Across Multiple Missions – Stanford Medical School
- 2017 Eva King Killam Research Award for Outstanding Translational Research Contributions – ACNP
- 2017 A.E. Bennett Research Award for Outstanding Contributions to Clinical/Translational Research – Society for Biological Psychiatry
- 2017 Gerald R. Klerman Award Honorable Mention for outstanding clinical research achievement – Brain and Behavior Research Foundation
- 2015 Harold Amos Medical Faculty Development Award, Robert Wood Johnson Foundation
- 2014 Neuropsychopharmacology Editor's Award for Transformative Original Report (NEATOR) Award, American College of Neuropsychopharmacology
- 2014 Robins/Guze Award, American Psychopathological Association
- 2009 and 2014 Young Investigator Award from Brain and Behavior Research Foundation

== Select publications ==
- "Effects of Rapastinel (Formerly GLYX-13) on Serum Brain-Derived Neurotrophic Factor in Obsessive-Compulsive Disorder". Omer Linkovski, Hanyang Shen, Jordana Zwerling, Maria Filippou-Frye, Booil Jo, Elisabeth Cordell, Thomas B. Cooper, Helen Blair Simpson, Ronald M. Burch, Joseph R. Moskal, Francis Lee, Carolyn I. Rodriguez, J. Clin. Psychiatry. 2018 Jan/Feb;79(1):17l11824
- "Increased functional connectivity between the default mode and salience networks in unmedicated adults with obsessive-compulsive disorder." Posner J, Song I, Lee S, Rodriguez CI, Moore H, Marsh R, Blair Simpson H. HUMAN BRAIN MAPPING. 2016
- "Can expose-based CBT extend the effects of intravenous ketamine in obsessive-compulsive disorder? an open-label trial." Rodriguez, C. I., Wheaton, M., Zwerling, J., Steinman, S. A., Sonnenfeld, D., Galfalvy, H., Simpson, H. B. JOURNAL OF CLINICAL PSYCHIATRY. 2016; 77 (3): 408-409
- "In vivo effects of ketamine on glutamate-glutamine and gamma-aminobutyric acid in obsessive-compulsive disorder: Proof of concept." Rodriguez, C. I., Kegeles, L. S., Levinson, A., Ogden, R. T., Mao, X., Milak, M. S., Vermes, D., Xie, S., Hunter, L., Flood, P., Moore, H., Shungu, D. C., Simpson, H. B. Psychiatry research. 2015; 233 (2): 141–7.
- "Bridging the Divide: Advances and Challenges in Understanding the Impact of Race and Ethnicity on the Mental Health of Older Adults." Rodriguez, C. I., Zwerling, J., Sonnenfeld, D. AMERICAN JOURNAL OF GERIATRIC PSYCHIATRY. 2015; 23 (6): 545-547
- "Randomized Controlled Crossover Trial of Ketamine in Obsessive-Compulsive Disorder: Proof-of-Concept." Rodriguez, C. I., Kegeles, L. S., Levinson, A., Feng, T., Marcus, S. M., Vermes, D., Flood, P., Simpson, H. B. NEUROPSYCHOPHARMACOLOGY. 2013; 38 (12): 2475–2483
- "Prevalence and Correlates of Difficulty Discarding Results From a National Sample of the US Population." Rodriguez, C. I., Simpson, H. B., Liu, S., Levinson, A., Blanco, C. JOURNAL OF NERVOUS AND MENTAL DISEASE. 2013; 201 (9): 795-801
- "Prevalence of Hoarding Disorder in Individuals at Potential Risk of Eviction in New York City A Pilot Study." Rodriguez, C. I., Herman, D., Alcon, J., Chen, S., Tannen, A., Essock, S., Simpson, H. B. JOURNAL OF NERVOUS AND MENTAL DISEASE. 2012; 200 (1): 91-94
- "Minocycline Augmentation of Pharmacotherapy in Obsessive-Compulsive Disorder: An Open-Label Trial." Rodriguez, C. I., Bender, J., Marcus, S. M., Snape, M., Rynn, M., Simpson, H. B.. JOURNAL OF CLINICAL PSYCHIATRY. 2010; 71 (9): 1247–1249
- "High-efficiency deleter mice show that FLPe is an alternative to Cre-loxP." Rodriguez, C. I., Buchholz, F., Galloway, J., Sequerra, R., Kasper, J., Ayala, R., Stewart, A. F., Dymecki, S. M. NATURE GENETICS. 2000; 25 (2): 139-140
- "Origin of the precerebellar system." Rodriguez, C. I., Dymecki, S. M. NEURON. 2000; 27 (3): 475-486
