= Lysiane Lauret Challenge =

The Lysiane Lauret Challenge or Trophée Lysiane Lauret (earlier known as Morzine Avoriaz and Danse sur Glace de Grenoble) was an international figure skating competition held in Morzine, France. It was generally held in March or April. Medals were awarded in ice dancing.

== Medalists ==
Ice dancing medalists
Year	Title	Gold	Silver	Bronze	Details
1982	Morzine Avoriaz				
1983	Morzine Avoriaz	(Soviet Union) Marina Klimova / Sergei Ponomarenko	(United Kingdom) Wendy Sessions / Stephen Williams	(Czechoslovakia) Jindra Holá / Karol Foltán	
1984	Morzine Avoriaz		(Canada) Kelly Johnson / John Thomas		
1985	Morzine Avoriaz	(United States) Suzanne Semanick / Scott Gregory	(Soviet Union) Irina Zhuk / Oleg Petrov	(Italy) Isabella Michelli / Roberto Pelizzola	
1986	Morzine Avoriaz	(Soviet Union) Maia Usova / Alexander Zhulin	(United States) Renee Roca / Donald Adair	(Italy) Isabella Michelli / Roberto Pelizzola	
1987	Danse sur Glace de Grenoble	(Austria) Kathrin Beck / Christoff Beck	(Hungary) Klara Engi / Attila Toth	(Italy) Lia Trovati / Roberto Pelizzola	
1988	Danse sur Glace de Grenoble	(Austria) Kathrin Beck / Christoff Beck	(Hungary) Klara Engi / Attila Toth	(Italy) Lia Trovati / Roberto Pelizzola	
1989	Danse sur Glace de Grenoble	(Hungary) Klara Engi / Attila Toth	(United States) Suzanne Semanick / Ron Kravette	(Soviet Union) Svetlana Liapina / Georgi Sur	
1990	Danse sur Glace de Grenoble	(Soviet Union) Ilona Melnichenko / Gennady Kaskov	(Soviet Union) Irina Romanova / Igor Yaroshenko	(Soviet Union) Anjelika Krylova / Vladimir Leliukh	
1991	Danse sur Glace de Grenoble	(Soviet Union) Aliki Stergiadu / Juris Razgulajevs	(United States) Elizabeth McLean / Ron Kravette	(Soviet Union) Irina Lobacheva / Alexei Pospelov	
1992	Lysiane Lauret	(Commonwealth of Independent States) Anjelika Krylova / Vladimir Fedorov	(Latvia) Aliki Stergiadu / Juris Razgulajevs	(Italy) Anna Croci / Luca Mantovani	
1993	Lysiane Lauret	(Ukraine) Irina Romanova / Igor Yaroshenko	(Uzbekistan) Aliki Stergiadu / Juris Razgulajevs	(Russia) Irina Lobacheva / Ilia Averbukh	
1994	Lysiane Lauret				
1995	Lysiane Lauret	(Lithuania) Margarita Drobiazko / Povilas Vanagas	(Italy) Barbara Fusar-Poli / Maurizio Margaglio	(Russia) Ekaterina Gvozdkova / Nikolai Morozov	
1996	Lysiane Lauret	(Italy) Barbara Fusar-Poli / Maurizio Margaglio	(Poland) Sylwia Nowak / Sebastian Kolasinski	(Russia) Olga Sharutenko / Dmitri Naumkin	
1997	Lysiane Lauret	(Italy) Diane Gerencser / Pasquale Camerlengo	(Russia) Anna Semenovich / Vladimir Fedorov	(United Kingdom) Marika Humphreys / Philip Askew	
1998	Lysiane Lauret	(Israel) Galit Chait / Sergei Sakhnovski	(United States) Naomi Lang / Peter Tchernyshev	(France) Alia Ouabdelsselam / Benjamin Delmas	
