= Bobby Beauchamp =

American figure skater

Personal information
- Born: c. 1962

Figure skating career
- Country: United States
- Discipline: Men's singles
- Coach: Mabel Fairbanks; John Nicks
- Retired: c. 1986

Bobby Beauchamp (born c. 1962) is an American former competitive figure skater. He is the 1979 World Junior silver medalist, 1983 Skate America bronze medalist, and 1983 U.S. national pewter medalist. He won the bronze medal at the 1987 World Professional Championships in Jaca, Spain.

Beauchamp was raised in Culver City, California. He began skating as a nine-year-old, as a form of physical therapy, having been born with a club foot affecting his left leg. He trained at the Culver City Ice Arena and the Santa Monica Ice Chalet, coached by Mabel Fairbanks and John Nicks.

After ending his competitive career, Beauchamp skated with the Ice Capades. As of 2017, he is a skating coach at Ice Station in Valencia, California.

== Competitive highlights ==
International
Event	78–79	81–82	82–83	83–84	84–85	85–86
NHK Trophy	6th					
Skate America				3rd		
Skate Canada			6th			
International: Junior
World Junior Champ.	2nd					
National
U.S. Championships	2nd J	7th	4th	8th	7th	10th
U.S. Olympic Festival					?	
Eastern Sectionals			1st		1st	
J = Junior level
