= Michelle Boulos =

American figure skater

Personal information
- Born: December 24, 1988 (age 37) Fort Ord, California, U.S.
- Height: 5 ft 5 in (1.65 m)

Figure skating career
- Country: United States
- Skating club: The Skating Club of Boston
- Retired: 2008

Michelle Boulos (born December 24, 1988) is an American former competitive figure skater who competed in ladies' singles. She won one international medal, silver at the 2007 Ondrej Nepela Memorial. Her coaches included Evy Scotvold, Mary Scotvold, Konstantin Kostin, Suna Murray, and Peter Johansson.

== Results ==
International
| Event | 2003–04 | 2004–05 | 2005–06 | 2006–07 | 2007–08 |
|---|---|---|---|---|---|
| Ondrej Nepela Memorial | | | | | 2nd |
National
| U.S. Championships | 8th J. | | 15th | 9th | |
| Eastern Sectionals | 3rd J. | 9th | 4th | 3rd | 8th |
| New England Regionals | 2nd J. | 3rd | 1st | 1st | |
J. = Junior level
