= Suzanne Semanick =

American figure skater (born 1967)

Suzanne Marie "Suzy" Semanick (born May 18, 1967, in Bridgeville, Pennsylvania) is an American former figure skater. She competed in ice dance at the 1988 Winter Olympics with Scott Gregory. The pair won the gold medal at the U.S. Figure Skating Championships twice. She later paired with Ron Kravette and won two bronze medals at the United States Figure Skating Championships. She is now a coach and choreographer in Newark, Delaware and Aston, Pennsylvania.

== Results ==
=== With Alexander Miller ===
National
Event	1983
U.S. Championships	1st J
J = Junior level

=== With Scott Gregory ===
International
Event	1984–85	1985–86	1986–87	1987–88
Winter Olympics				6th
World Champ.	12th	5th	5th	
Morzine Avoriaz	1st			
NHK Trophy			2nd	
Skate America			2nd	
Skate Canada			2nd	
National
U.S. Champ.	3rd	2nd	1st	1st
Eastern Sectionals	1st	1st		

=== With Ron Kravette ===
International
Event	1988–89	1989–90
Danse sur Glace de Grenoble	2nd	
Nations Cup		2nd
Skate Canada International		1st
Skate Electric	3rd	
National
U.S. Championships	3rd	3rd
Eastern Sectionals	1st	1st
