= Ron Kravette =

American ice dancer

Ron Kravette (born June 17, 1963) is a retired American ice dancer. With partner Suzanne Semanick, he won the bronze medal at the United States Figure Skating Championships in 1989 and 1990. After skating with Elizabeth McLean (4th in the US in 1991) for a time, he teamed with Amy Webster, and they were national bronze medalists in 1994 and 1995, and 4th in the US in 1993 and 1997. They were 1st at the US Olympic Festival in 1993. Kravette also previously skated with partner Colette Huber.They were US Junior Dance champions in 1986. Ron has an AA from Orange Coast College (1983), a BA in History from the University of California, Irvine (1986), an MA in Government from Harvard University (2006), and is currently a PhD candidate in Global Studies at the University of Massachusetts, Lowell.

Ron's sister, Aimee Kravette, was also a competitive figure skater.

More recently, Kravette is a skating coach and history teacher at a community college. He had a book, entitled Collapse: How the Fall of the Soviet Union Changed Figure Skating in the United States and the World, published in 2011. He has been a 5-year member of the US Figure Skating's Board of Directors, a US National Technical Specialist in ice dance, and was awarded the Professional Skating Association's (PSA) Presidential Award of Excellence for coaching in 2020 and 2021.

== Competitive highlights ==
GP: Champions Series (Grand Prix)

=== With Webster ===
International
Event	92–93	93–94	94–95	95–96	96–97
GP Nations Cup				10th	
GP Skate America					11th
Piruetten	4th				
Skate Canada		9th			
National
U.S. Championships	4th	3rd	3rd	5th	4th
Eastern Sectionals			1st	1st	1st

=== With McLean ===
International
Event	1990–91	1991–92
Danse sur Glace de Grenoble	2nd	
NHK Trophy		9th
National
U.S. Championships	4th	6th
Eastern Sectionals	1st	

=== With Semanick ===
International
Event	1988–89	1989–90
Danse sur Glace de Grenoble	2nd	
Nations Cup		2nd
Skate Canada International		1st
Skate Electric	3rd	
National
U.S. Championships	3rd	3rd
Eastern Sectionals	1st	1st

=== With Huber ===
National
Event	1984–85	1985–86
U.S. Championships	8th J	1st J
J = Junior level
