= Rosie Tovi =

American figure skater

Rosanna "Rosie" Tovi is an American former competitive figure skater who competed in ladies' singles. She is the 1982 Asko Cup champion, 1983 U.S. national junior bronze medalist, and 1992 Eastern Sectional champion. She competed internationally at Prague Skate, Skate Canada International and the Asko Cup. Her coaches included Carlo Fassi, Frank Carroll, and John Nicks.

Tovi finished in the top ten at the 1992 U.S. Championships. She was inducted into the Skating Club of Lake Placid Hall of Fame. After turning professional in 1992, she performed pairs and singles. She was named British Professional champion following her performance at the 1998 World Professional Championships in Jaca, Spain. She traveled the world starring in tours, shows and TV specials including Dorothy Hamill's Cinderella Frozen in Time Tour and ABC-TV special and Torvill and Dean's Ice Adventures Tour and BBC television special. She also played Ariel in Disney On Ice's The Little Mermaid.

Tovi has worked as a skating coach and choreographer and was named to the Professional Skaters Association Honor Roll of Coaches. She has also developed DVD figure skating lessons and a line of skating wear called Rosie Wear. She is the founder and chief executive officer of World Ice Events, LLC a skating event production and management company located in Manhattan. In May 2009 World Ice Events produced Stand Up For Life, a benefit show for Susan G. Komen For The Cure. The event was held in Essex County, New Jersey and featured Olympic champion Oksana Baiul, hosted by Olympian JoJo Starbuck and a cast of forty skaters.

== Results ==
International
Event	1982–83	1983–84	1990–91	1991–92
Asko Cup	1st			
Prague Skate		8th		
National
U.S. Championships	3rd J		12th	10th
Eastern Sectionals				1st
J = Junior level
