= Jordan Miller (figure skater) =

American figure skater

Personal information
- Born: New York, New York, U.S.
- Height: 5 ft 8 in (1.73 m)

Figure skating career
- Country: United States
- Coach: Jeff DiGregorio, Jeff Schneider
- Skating club: Skating Club of New York

Jordan Miller (born in New York, New York) is an American figure skater. He is the 2006 US National Junior silver medalist, 2007 US National Senior competitor, and won the silver medal at the 2006 Ondrej Nepela Memorial. Miller also worked as a figure skating judge but has moved on to pursue a career in law and is currently studying at the University of Virginia School of Law.

== Competitive highlights ==
Event	1996-97	1997-98	1998-99	1999-00	2000-01	2001-02	2002-03	2003-04	2004-05	2005-06	2006-07
U.S. Championships										2nd J.	12th
Ondrej Nepela Memorial											2nd
Eastern Sectionals		8th N.	14th J.	12th J.	10th J.					1st J.	
Pacific Coast Sectionals							5th J.	9th J.	5th J.		
North Atlantic Regionals	5th N.	4th N.			3rd J.					1st J.	
Northwest Pacific Regionals							2nd J.	2nd J.			

- J = Junior level
