= Barry Hagan =

American figure skater

Barry James Hagan (August 2, 1957 – September 26, 1993) was an American figure skater. Competing in ice dance with partner Kim Krohn, he won the bronze medal at the U.S. Figure Skating Championships in 1981.

Away from the ice, Hagan was struck by a car and knocked through a plate glass door while working as a department store security guard in July 1981. The driver of the car was an angry store customer.

Hagan died in hospice of an AIDS-related illness in Long Beach, California, aged 36. in 1993 at age 36.
