= Lee Harris (figure skater) =

Personal information
- Born: October 16, 1981 (age 44) Windsor, Ontario, Canada

Figure skating career
- Country: United States
- Skating club: Detroit SC
- Began skating: 1984
- Retired: 2006

Lee Harris (born October 16, 1981) is a skating coach for the Columbus Blue Jackets and former pair skater who competed internationally for the United States. With partner Colette Appel, he is the 2002 U.S. national junior champion and placed 12th at the 2002 World Junior Championships. They were fourth at two ISU Junior Grand Prix events and on the senior level at the 2003 Finlandia Trophy.

A native of Harrow, Ontario, Harris practiced both ice hockey and figure skating from the age of three. He also played Jr. Hockey for the Belle River Canadians and Kingsville Comets in the Great Lakes Junior C Hockey League (GLJCHL) from 1996 to 1999. Harris settled on figure skating at age 18.

After splitting with his previous partner, Harris paired with Colette Appel in 2000, after getting invited to Newington, Connecticut, by Appel's mother to train with her. While in Connecticut, he was roommates with Alexei Yagudin. The pair of Harris and Appel "burst on to the scene" by winning the 2002 U.S. national junior title. They made their senior debut at the 2003 Finlandia Trophy, finishing in fourth place.

In 2006, Harris retired from competitive figure skating and began a five-year professional skating career going on tour with Royal Caribbean Cruise ships.

== Coaching career ==
After retiring from Royal Caribbean, Harris began coaching at the Chiller Skating Rinks in Columbus, Ohio. In 2012 and 2013 he became a National Level Figure Skating Coach when his Novice pair team competed at the U.S. National figure skating championships.

In 2014, Harris was hired by the Columbus Blue Jackets (NHL) as their skating coach. Harris works with both the Columbus Blue Jackets players and their AHL affiliate team.

In 2017, Harris was added onto the Ohio State Buckeyes men's ice hockey team's coaching staff as the on-ice conditioning specialist (consultant).

== Programs ==
(with Colette Appel)

Season	Short program	Free skating
2005–2006	Finished Symphony by ATB	Waterworld by James Newton Howard
2001–2002	The Children by Robert Parsons	Dragonheart by Randy Edelman

== Results ==
(pairs with Colette Appel)

Results
International
Event	2001–02	2002–03	2003–04	2004–05	2005–06
Finlandia Trophy			4th		
International: Junior
World Junior Championships	12th				
JGP Serbia		4th			
JGP Slovakia		4th			
National
U.S. Championships	1st J.	3rd J.	15th	11th	12th
J. = Junior level; JGP = Junior Grand Prix

== Personal life ==
Harris was previously married to Marcy Hinzmann, his skating partner on the Royal Caribbean cruise ship tours. He married Chelsea Koenigseker in 2015.
