= Emmanuel Savary =

American figure skater (born 1998)

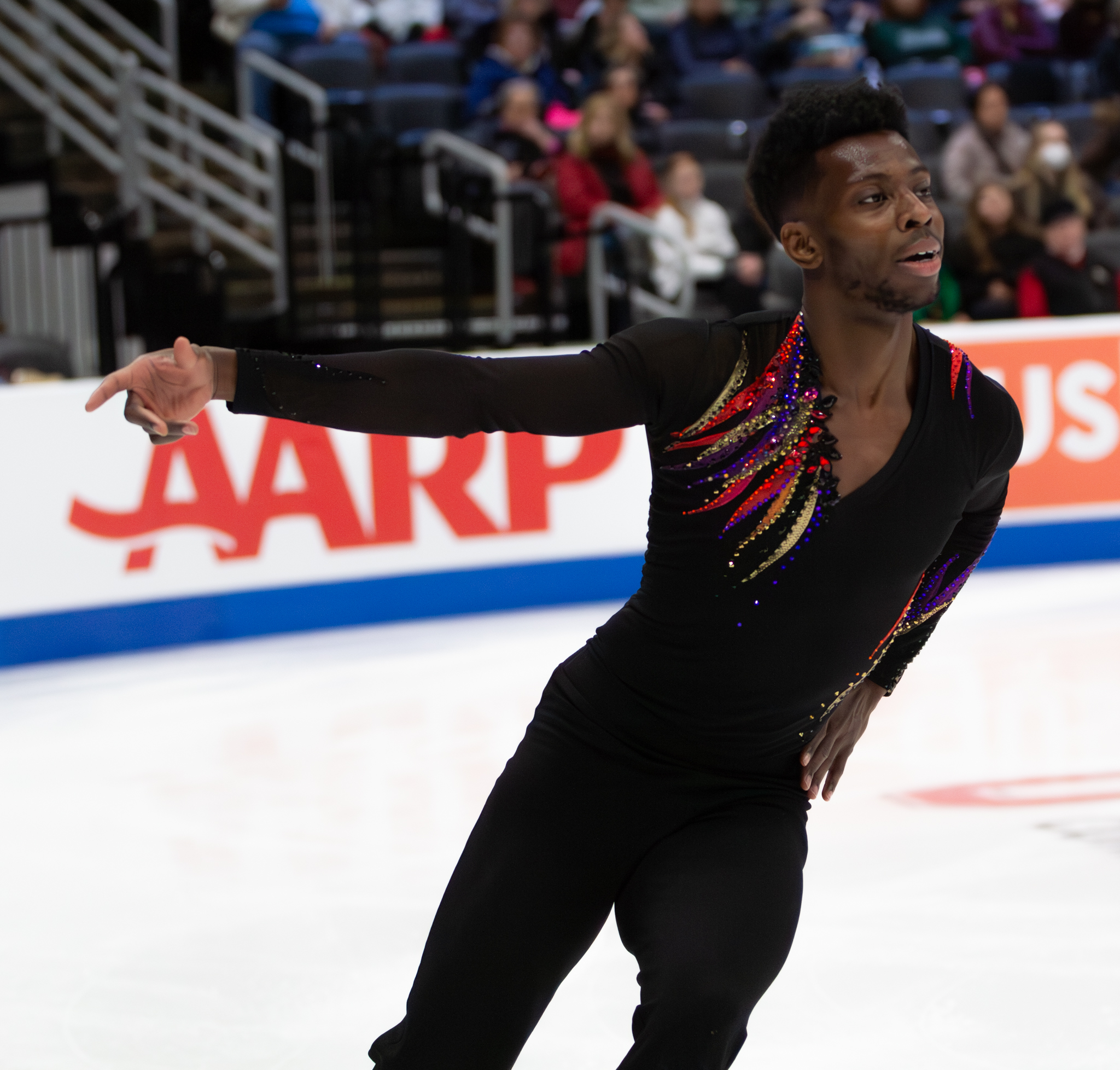
- Savary at the 2026 U.S. Championships

Personal information
- Born: January 6, 1998 (age 28) Hollywood, Florida, U.S.
- Home town: Newark, Delaware, U.S.
- Height: 5 ft 10 in (1.79 m)

Figure skating career
- Country: United States
- Discipline: Men's singles
- Coach: Jeff DiGregorio; Pamela Gregory
- Skating club: University of Delaware Figure Skating Club
- Began skating: 2001

Emmanuel Savary (born January 6, 1998) is an American figure skater. He graduated from Glasgow High School in Glasgow, Delaware in June 2016 and his brother is former ice skater Joel Savary. He and Starr Andrews were the only two African Americans to take part in the 2020 U.S. Figure Skating Championships.

Savary is of Jamaican descent.

== Programs ==
Season	Short program	Free skating
2011–2012	Black Cat, White Cat by Goran Bregović choreo. by David Wilson	The Lion King by Hans Zimmer choreo. by David Wilson
2016–2017	Viejos Aires by Nuevo Tango Ensamble choreo. by Evgeni Platov	House of Flying Daggers; Fearless by Shigeru Umebayashi; Crouching Tiger, Hidden Dragon by Tan Dun choreo. by Evgeni Platov
2024–2025	Purple Rain by Prince choreo. by Emmanuel Savary	Saturn by Sleeping at Last choreo. by Emmanuel Savary
2025–2026	Purple Rain by Prince choreo. by Emmanuel Savary	Saturn by Sleeping at Last choreo. by Emmanuel Savary

== Competitive highlights ==
- JGP – Event of the ISU Junior Grand Prix Series
- TBD – Assigned
- WD – Withdrew from competition

Competition placements at senior level
Season	2015–16	2016–17	2017–18	2018–19	2024–25	2025–26
U.S. Championships	13th	13th	18th	11th	13th	16th
Maria Olszewska Memorial					3rd	
Philadelphia Summer	4th					
Tayside Trophy						6th

Competition placements at junior level
Season	2010–11	2011–12	2015–16
U.S. Championships	5th	12th	
JGP Japan			12th
JGP Latvia		14th	
Triglav Trophy			1st

== Detailed results ==
=== Senior level ===
Results in the 2024–25 season
Date	Event	SP		FS		Total	
Date	Event	P	Score	P	Score	P	Score
Jan 20–26, 2025	(United States) 2025 U.S. Championships	14	70.48	13	129.71	13	200.19
Mar 4–9, 2025	(Poland) 2025 Maria Olszewska Memorial	3	62.00	3	117.33	3	179.33

Results in the 2025–26 season
Date	Event	SP		FS		Total	
Date	Event	P	Score	P	Score	P	Score
Oct 11–12, 2025	(United Kingdom) 2025 Tayside Trophy	7	62.32	5	120.33	6	182.65
Jan 4–11, 2026	(United States) 2026 U.S. Championships	15	60.21	15	127.93	16	188.14
