= Pavel Filchenkov =

Russian ice dancer

Personal information
- Full name: Pavel Filchenkov
- Born: July 9, 1986 (age 39) Nizhny Novgorod

Figure skating career
- Country: United States
- Coach: Natalya Linichuk; Gennadiy Karponosov

Pavel Filchenkov (born July 9, 1986, Nizhny Novgorod) is a Russian ice dancer.

With partner Alexandra Volchek, Filchenkov competed in Russia, and represented Russia internationally on the junior-level from 2002 to 2004. They competed at the Russian Cup, a series of Russian domestic competitions, for several years, including 2005 and 2006.

The best international placement for Volchek and Filchenkov was a first-place finish at the 2003 Helena Pajovic Cup & Belgrade Trophy in Belgrade, Serbia. They also represented Russia at the 2003 Baltic Cup in Poland.

In July 2008, Filchenkov teamed up with Virginia Hoptman to compete for Azerbaijan. They are coached by Natalya Linichuk and Gennadiy Karponosov at Iceworks Skating Complex in Aston, Pennsylvania.

In 2012, he competed for the United States with his new partner, Ginna Hoptman. They placed 11th at the U.S. Championships.
