= Elisa Spitz =

American figure skater

Elisa Hope Spitz-Iuliano (born May 17, 1963, in Short Hills, New Jersey) is an American former figure skater. She competed in ice dance at the 1984 Winter Olympics with Scott Gregory. Elisa is the mother of two sons, Joe Iuliano and Mike Iuliano. Elisa's eldest son Joe is a former NCAA Div. I Football player at Morehead State University. Mike is currently a musician featuring in songs alongside DJ4B, Kyle Woodcock, and many other well-known artists in the industry. Mike's stagename is DJ M.I and is a member of Secret Sauce.

== Results ==
(with Scott Gregory)

International
Event	79–80	80–81	81–82	82–83	83–84
Winter Olympics					10th
World Champ.			8th	7th	10th
NHK Trophy			4th		
Skate America			4th	1st	1st
Skate Canada		4th		1st	
National
U.S. Champ.	6th	4th	3rd	2nd	3rd
Eastern Sectionals				1st	
