= Newbold Black =

American hockey player

Personal information
- Full name: Edgar Newbold Black IV
- Nationality: American
- Born: June 11, 1929 Philadelphia, Pennsylvania, U.S.
- Died: June 1, 2013 (aged 83)
- Height: 6 ft 0 in (183 cm)
- Weight: 157 lb (71 kg)

Sport
- Sport: Field hockey

Edgar Newbold Black IV (June 11, 1929 – June 1, 2013) was an American field hockey player. He competed in the men's tournament at the 1956 Summer Olympics.
