= Priscilla Hill =

American figure skater

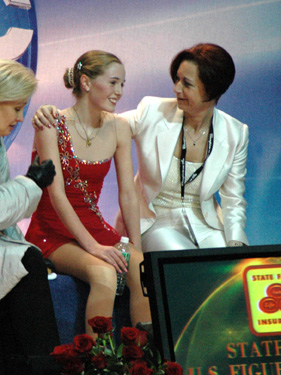
- Priscilla Hill with Katherine Hadford.

Personal information
- Born: October 4, 1961 (age 64)

Figure skating career
- Country: United States
- Retired: 1982

Priscilla Hill-Wampler (born October 4, 1961) is an American figure skating coach and former competitor. She is a two-time U.S. national medalist (silver in 1981, bronze in 1978) and finished within the top ten at two World Championships. She won gold at three international events – the 1974 Nebelhorn Trophy, the 1975 Prague Skate, and 1977 Richmond Trophy. In 1975, she became the first American woman to land the triple loop jump in competition.

== Personal life ==
Priscilla Hill was born on October 4, 1961. She would marry Jon Wampler, a commercial airline pilot. In 2005, she was diagnosed with Graves' disease. After pausing her coaching career in 2012, she became a certified Sporting Group and Terrier Group groomer with the National Dog Grooming Association of America and also began competing in agility events with her dogs.

== Competitive career ==
Hill passed her eighth compulsory figures test and gold freestyle test at the age of nine, possibly the youngest person ever to do so. In 1972, at age 11, she was the youngest senior lady ever to compete at the United States Figure Skating Championships.

Early in her career, Hill was coached by Howard Nicholson in Lake Placid, New York. Due to the distance from her hometown of Lexington, Massachusetts, during the school year she only got occasional lessons and otherwise had to practice on her own at a local rink.

Hill won the bronze medal at the U.S. Figure Skating Championships in 1978 and the silver in 1981. In 1975 she landed a triple loop in competition, at the Prague Skate in Czechoslovakia. She finished 9th at the 1978 World Championships and 7th in 1981. She missed the 1980 Olympic season due to injury and was not able to challenge for a spot on the Olympic team.

== Professional and coaching career ==
Hill performed with the Ice Capades in 1984 and 1985. She worked as a coach at the University of Delaware Figure Skating Club before moving to coach at The Pond Ice Arena in Newark, Delaware in 2003. In 2007, she moved again, this time to the Skating Club of Wilmington Ice Rink in Wilmington, Delaware.

Hill's most decorated former student is Johnny Weir, whom she coached to the gold medal at the 2001 World Junior Championships and three U.S. national titles (2004, 2005, and 2006). She was named the 2004 U.S. Figure Skating Association Coach of the Year for her work with Weir. Other former students include Ashley Wagner, Melissa Gregory / Denis Petukhov, Jenna Syken, Katherine Hadford, Vanessa James, Blake Rosenthal, Christine Zukowski, Katherine Copely, Dean Copely, Andrea Varraux / David Pelletier, Christopher Berneck, and Viktor Pfeifer.

Hill-Wampler paused her coaching career in 2012. In 2018, she became the skating director at the Patriot Ice Center in Newark, Delaware.

== Competitive highlights ==
International
| Event | 73–74 | 73-74 | 74–75 | 75–76 | 76–77 | 77–78 | 78–79 | 80–81 | 81–82 |
|---|---|---|---|---|---|---|---|---|---|
| World Champ. | | | | | | 9th | | 7th | |
| Nebelhorn Trophy | | | 1st | | | | | | |
| Prague Skate | | | | 1st | | | | | |
| Richmond Trophy | | | | | | 1st | | | |
National
| U.S. Championships | 13th | 6th | | | 4th | 3rd | | 2nd | 6th |
| Eastern Sectionals | | 1st | | 1st | 1st | 1st | 1st | | |
