= Lucille Ash =

American figure skater

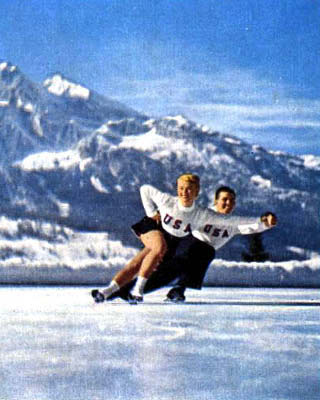

Personal information
- Full name: Lucille Mary Ash McClure
- Born: Lucille Mary Ash McClure; May 26, 1935 (age 91) Colorado Springs, Colorado, U.S.

Figure skating career
- Country: America
- Partner: Sully Kothmann
- Skating club: Broadmoor Skating Club

Lucille Mary Ash McClure (born May 26, 1935) is an American former figure skater who competed in pairs with Sully Kothmann. They twice captured the silver medal at the United States Figure Skating Championships and competed at the 1956 Winter Olympics. She was born in Colorado Springs, Colorado. She attended Colorado College and was a member of Kappa Alpha Theta.

== Results ==
(with Kothmann)

Event	1954	1955	1956
Winter Olympics			7th
World Championships		8th	6th
U.S. Championships	3rd	2nd	2nd
