= Scott Gregory (ice skater) =

American ice dancer (born 1959)

Scott Chase Gregory (born July 31, 1959 in Auburn, New York) is an American former competitive ice dancer.

He was born and raised in Skaneateles, New York.

He competed at the 1984 Winter Olympics with Elisa Spitz. He then paired with Suzanne Semanick, with whom he won the gold medal at the U.S. Figure Skating Championships twice and competed at the Olympics in 1988. He retired from skating that year due to back injuries.

He was inducted into the Delaware Sports Hall of Fame in 2017.

Gregory is married to former figure skater Pam Gregory, who now coaches Kimmie Meissner.

== Results ==
=== With Elisa Spitz ===
International
Event	79–80	80–81	81–82	82–83	83–84
Winter Olympics					10th
World Champ.			8th	7th	10th
NHK Trophy			4th		
Skate America			4th	1st	1st
Skate Canada		4th		1st	
National
U.S. Champ.	6th	4th	3rd	2nd	3rd
Eastern Sectionals				1st	

=== With Suzanne Semanick ===
International
Event	1984–85	1985–86	1986–87	1987–88
Winter Olympics				6th
World Champ.	12th	5th	5th	
Morzine Avoriaz	1st			
NHK Trophy			2nd	
Skate America			2nd	
Skate Canada			2nd	
National
U.S. Champ.	3rd	2nd	1st	1st
Eastern Sectionals	1st	1st		
