= Andree Anderson =

American ice dancer

Personal information
- Full name: Andree Anderson
- Other names: Andree Jacoby
- Born: Chicago, Illinois

Figure skating career
- Country: United States
- Partner: Donald Jacoby
- Skating club: Buffalo SC
Medal record
Figure skating
Ice dancing
Representing the United States
World Championships
| Silver medal – second place | 1959 Colorado Springs | Ice dancing |
| Bronze medal – third place | 1958 Paris | Ice dancing |
North American Championships
| Silver medal – second place | 1959 Toronto | Ice dancing |

Andree Anderson was an American ice dancer born in Chicago, Illinois. She was inducted in the United States Figure Skating Hall of Fame in 1997 along with her skating partner and husband, Donald Jacoby.

== Career ==
Andree Anderson was the 1958 and 1959 U.S. national champion. She and Donald Jacoby were the 1959 World silver medalists and the 1958 World bronze medalists.

The Jacobys turned professional in 1959 in order to tour with Ice Follies.

== Results ==
(with Donald Jacoby)

| Event | 1957 | 1958 | 1959 |
|---|---|---|---|
| World Championships | | 3rd | 2nd |
| North American Championships | | | 2nd |
| U.S. Championships | 2nd | 1st | 1st |
