= Alice Cook (figure skater) =

American figure skater

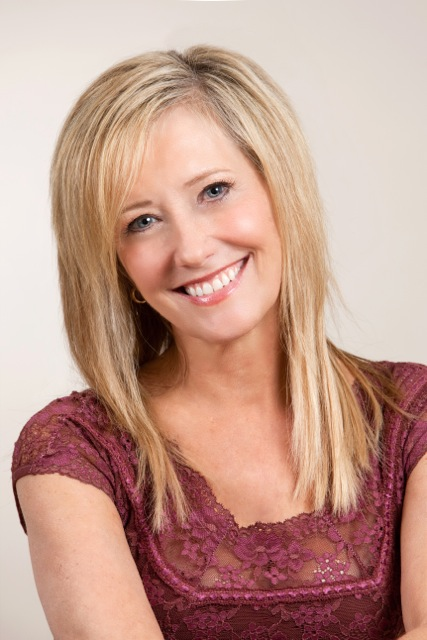

Personal information
- Full name: Alice Maxine Cook
- Born: November 30, 1955 (age 70) Lansing, Michigan, U.S.
- Height: 5 ft 2 in (1.57 m)
- Spouse: Patrick Voke

Figure skating career
- Country: United States

Alice Maxine Cook (born November 30, 1955) is an American sports reporter and an Olympic figure skater, in pair skating. Her partner was William Fauver. She is the 1976 U.S. silver medalist. They represented the United States at the 1976 Winter Olympics, where they placed 12th. One month later Cook and her partner placed 9th in the World Championships in Sweden.

== Career ==
Following her skating career, Cook became a television sports reporter. She began her career at Boston, Massachusetts' WSBK-TV as a sports producer. In October 1984, Cook was hired by WBZ-TV. She worked there as a sports reporter until 2010, when she decided not to accept an offer to continue as a free lancer. Cook has reported for ESPN. She hosted the figure skating coverage for Turner Sports during the 1998 Winter Olympics. She has won the Action for Children's Television award, two Service to Children awards from the NAB, several Parents' Choice Awards for the program "Rap Around", and the Gracie Award (named for Gracie Allen), given for excellence in portraying women in a positive light, for a segment on Mari-Rae Sopper, a former gymnast killed in the 9/11 incident.

In 2011, Cook became president and founder of "She's Game Sports." She's Game Sports is a new media company dedicated to women who consider themselves knowledgeable and passionate fans of sports. Shesgamesports.com is website designed to inform, entertain, and engage women who make sports part of their daily conversation and lifestyle. In 2012, Cook became featured on Boston.com with her own sports blog.

== Personal life ==
Cook earned a Bachelor of Arts degree in history and speech communication at Boston College, graduating magna cum laude. She is married with three children and lives in the Greater Boston area.

== Competitive highlights ==
=== With Fauver ===
International
Event	1975–76
Winter Olympics	12th
World Championships	9th
Nebelhorn Trophy	2nd
National
U.S. Championships	2nd
