= Marcy Hinzmann =

American pair skater

Personal information
- Full name: Marcy Hinzmann-Simpson
- Born: May 26, 1982 (age 44) Norman, Oklahoma, U.S.
- Height: 5 ft 1 in (1.54 m)

Figure skating career
- Country: United States
- Skating club: Winterhurst FSC
- Began skating: 1990
- Retired: May 30, 2006

Marcy Hinzmann-Simpson (born May 26, 1982) is an American former competitive pair skater. With Aaron Parchem, she is the 2006 U.S. national silver medalist and competed at the 2006 Winter Olympics.

== Personal life ==
Marcy Hinzmann was born May 26, 1982, in Norman, Oklahoma, the eldest of three children. Her mother is from Venezuela. Hinzmann is married to former NHL hockey player Todd Simpson and settled in Kelowna, British Columbia.

== Career ==
Hinzmann began skating at age eight. As a singles skater, she was coached by Carol Heiss Jenkins. After switching to pairs, she skated with Ronnie Biancosino from around 2000 to 2002 and then with Steve Hartsell for one season.

Hinzmann teamed up with Aaron Parchem in 2003. She tore the anterior cruciate ligament in her left knee during a practice in August 2004 and skated with the injury during the season. She underwent surgery following the U.S. Championships in January 2005 and was off the ice for four months.

The pair won the bronze medal at the 2005 U.S. Championships and silver in 2006. They were selected to represent the United States at the 2006 Winter Olympics, where they finished 13th. The pair then placed 11th at the 2006 World Championships.

Hinzmann ended her competitive career on May 30, 2006, and went on to skate professionally with Lee Harris on cruise ships and in gala shows. She participated in the third season of the Canadian television show Battle of the Blades, partnered with Todd Simpson.

== Programs ==
(with Parchem)

Season	Short program	Free skating
2005–2006	The Mission by Ennio Morricone performed by Yo-Yo Ma	Esperanza by Maxime Rodriguez; Once Upon a Time in Mexico by Robert Rodriguez
2004–2005	Hey You; The Fletcher Memorial Home by Pink Floyd	Esperanza by Maxime Rodriguez; Once Upon a Time in Mexico by Robert Rodriguez
2003–2004	Tosca by Giacomo Puccini	Coeur Brave by Maxime Rodriguez

== Results ==
=== With Parchem ===
International
Event	2003–04	2004–05	2005–06
Winter Olympics			13th
World Championships			11th
Four Continents Champ.			4th
GP Skate America			4th
Bofrost Cup on Ice		6th	
Finlandia Trophy	3rd		
Nebelhorn Trophy		1st	3rd
National
U.S. Championships	7th	3rd	2nd

=== With Hartsell ===
National
Event	2003
U.S. Championships	9th

=== With Biancosino ===
National
Event	2001	2002
U.S. Championships	8th J.	12th
J. = Junior level
