= Jane Vaughn =

American figure skater

Personal information
- Born: 31 July 1921
- Died: 25 March 2016 (aged 94)

Figure skating career
- Country: United States
- Skating club: Philadelphia SC & HS

Jane Vaughn (married: Sullivan) (July 31, 1921 - March 25, 2016) was an American figure skater. She won the United States Figure Skating Championships in 1940 and 1941.

She was inducted into the U.S. Figure Skating Hall Of Fame in 1996. She was the older sister of Arthur Vaughn Jr.

== Results ==
Event	1937	1938	1939	1940	1941	1942
U.S. Championships	3rd J	4th	4th	3rd	1st	1st
