= Robert Swenning =

American figure skater

Personal information
- Born: July 25, 1924 Greenwich, Connecticut
- Died: November 8, 2012 (aged 88)

Figure skating career
- Country: United States
Medal record
Representing the United States
Pairs figure skating
North American Championships
Silver medal – second place	1947 Ottawa	Pairs

Robert Joseph "Bob" Swenning (July 25, 1924 – November 8, 2012) was an American figure skater. He was born in Greenwich, Connecticut. He originally competed in ice dance, winning the gold medal at the 1945 United States Figure Skating Championships with partner Kathe Mehl Williams. He later switched to pairs skating and teamed up with Yvonne Sherman. The duo won the 1947 U.S. title, placed fourth at the 1948 Winter Olympic Games, and finished fifth at that year's World Figure Skating Championship. He later paired with Agnes Tyson and won the bronze medal at the 1955 U.S. Championships.

== Pairs ==
(with Sherman)

Event	1947	1948
Winter Olympics		4th
World Championships		5th
North American Championships	2nd	
U.S. Championships	1st	2nd

(with Tyson)

Event	1955
U.S. Championships	3rd

== Ice Dance ==
(with Williams)

Event	1945
U.S. Championships	1st

== Men's singles ==
Event	1944	1945	1946	1947	1948
U.S. Championships	3rd J	3rd J	3rd J	1st J	WD
