= Arthur Vaughn Jr. =

Figure skater (1924–2007)

Personal information
- Born: February 13, 1924
- Died: January 17, 2007 (aged 82)

Figure skating career
- Country: United States
- Coach: Gustave Lussi (former)
- Skating club: Philadelphia SC & HS

Arthur Vaughn Jr. (February 13, 1924 – January 17, 2007) was an American figure skater. He won the United States Figure Skating Championships in 1943. He was inducted into the U.S. Figure Skating Hall of Fame in 2001.

He was the brother of Jane Vaughn.

== Results ==
(men's singles)

Event	1939	1940	1941	1942	1943
U.S. Championships	1st J	4th	2nd	3rd	1st
