= Irene Maguire =

American figure skater

Personal information
- Born: November 17, 1929
- Died: April 10, 2016 (aged 86)

Figure skating career
- Country: United States
- Retired: 1950
Medal record
Representing United States
Pairs' Figure skating
North American Championships
Bronze medal – third place	1949 Philadelphia	Pairs
Ice dancing Figure skating
North American Championships
Silver medal – second place	1949 Philadelphia	Ice dancing

Irene Maguire (November 17, 1929 - April 10, 2016) was an American figure skater. She competed in pairs and ice dance with Walter Muehlbronner, whom she married in 1951. They won national silver medals in both pairs and ice dance in 1949 and 1950. The two continued skating as professionals, billed as "Walter and Irene" for 7 years, in the Ice Follies.

== Results ==
(pairs with Muehlbronner)

Event	1949	1950
World Championships	10th	
North American Championships	3rd	
U.S. Championships	2nd	2nd

(ice dance with Muehlbronner)

Event	1949	1950
North American Championships	2nd	
U.S. Championships	2nd	2nd
