= Lois Waring =

American figure skater (1930–1989)

Personal information
- Born: June 3, 1930 Baltimore
- Died: February 21, 1989 (aged 58) Norwich, Vermont, U.S.

Figure skating career
- Country: United States
Medal record
Representing the United States
Ice dancing
North American Championships
Gold medal – first place	1949 Philadelphia	Ice dancing
Gold medal – first place	1947 Ottawa	Ice dancing

Lois Waring (June 3, 1930 – February 21, 1989) was an American figure skater. She competed in ice dance with Walter Bainbridge, and later with Michael McGean. She was the national champion with Bainbridge in 1947–1949 and North American Champion in 1947 and 1949. With McGean, she was the national champion in 1950 and 1952. Waring died in Norwich, Vermont on February 21, 1989, at the age of 58.

== Results ==
(with Bainbridge)

Event	1946	1947	1948	1949
North American Championships		1st		1st
U.S. Championships	2nd	1st	1st	1st

(with McGean)

Event	1950	1951	1952
U.S. Championships	1st		1st
