= Harvey Millier =

American ice dancer

Personal information
- Other names: Skip

Figure skating career
- Country: United States
Medal record
Representing the United States
Figure skating
Ice dancing
North American Championships
Silver medal – second place	1971 Peterborough	Ice dancing

Harvey "Skip" Millier III is an American former ice dancer who competed with his sister Anne Millier.

== Results ==
(with Millier)

Event	1970	1971	1972	1973	1974	1975
World Championships	10th	9th	7th	10th	13th	
North American Championships		2nd				
U.S. Championships	2nd	2nd	2nd	2nd	2nd	4th
