= Anne Millier =

American ice dancer

Ann E Millier
Figure skating career
- Country: United States
Medal record
Representing the United States
Figure skating
Ice dancing
North American Championships
Silver medal – second place	1971 Peterborough	Ice dancing

Ann Millier is an American ice dancer. She competed with her brother Harvey Millier.

== Results ==
(with Millier)

Event	1970	1971	1972	1973	1974	1975
World Championships	10th	9th	7th	10th	13th	
North American Championships		2nd				
U.S. Championships	2nd	2nd	2nd	2nd	2nd	4th
