= William Fauver =

American pair skater

Personal information
- Full name: William Benjamin Fauver
- Born: March 2, 1954 (age 72) Cleveland
- Height: 1.75 m (5 ft 9 in)

Figure skating career
- Country: United States
- Skating club: Cuyahoga Country Club

William Benjamin Fauver (born March 2, 1954, in Cleveland, Ohio) is an American former pair skater.

== Career ==
Early in his career, Fauver competed in junior pairs with Susan Jackson. By 1972, he was competing in junior pair skating with Patty Morton.

Fauver competed in senior pair skating with partner Alice Cook. They won the silver medal at the 1976 U.S. Championships and represented the United States at the 1976 Winter Olympics where they placed 12th.

After several years away from competition, Fauver returned with new partner Lee Ann Miller. They won three silver medals at the U.S. national championships (1981, 1983, 1984) and the 1982 bronze medal. They represented the United States at the 1984 Winter Olympics, where they placed 10th.

== Competitive highlights ==
=== Pairs with Lea Ann Miller ===
International
Event	1979-80	1980–81	1981–82	1982–83	1983–84
Winter Olympic Games					10th
World Championships		10th	8th	7th	10th
Skate America			4th	2nd	
National
U.S. Championships	7th	2nd	3rd	2nd	2nd

=== Pairs with Alice Cook ===
International
Event	1975–1976
Winter Olympic Games	12th
World Championships	9th
Nebelhorn Trophy	2nd
National
U.S. Championships	2nd

=== Junior Pairs with Morton ===
Event	1972
U.S. Championships	8th Junior

=== Novice Pairs with Jackson ===
Event	1970
U.S. Championships	4th Novice
