= Donald Jacoby =

American ice dancer

Personal information
- Full name: Donald Arthur Jacoby

Figure skating career
- Country: United States
- Partner: Andree Anderson
- Skating club: Buffalo SC
- Retired: 1959
Medal record
Figure skating
Ice dancing
Representing the United States
North American Championships
Silver medal – second place	1959 Toronto	Ice dancing
Silver medal – second place	1953 Cleveland	Ice dancing

Donald Jacoby was an American ice dancer. With partner and wife Andree Anderson, he was the 1958 and 1959 U.S. national champion. They were the 1959 World silver medalists and the 1958 World bronze medalist.

The Jacobys turned professional in 1959 in order to tour with Holiday On Ice.

He was posthumously inducted into the United States Figure Skating Hall of Fame in 1997.

== Results ==
=== Ice Dance ===
(with Virginia Hoyns)

Event	1951	1952	1953
North American Championships			2nd
U.S. Championships	2nd		2nd

(with Andree Anderson)

Event	1957	1958	1959
World Championships		3rd	2nd
North American Championships			2nd
U.S. Championships	2nd	1st	1st

=== Men's singles ===
Event	1948	1949
U.S. Championships	3rd J	2nd J
