= Charles Brinkman =

American figure skater

Charles W. Brinkman (1928–2003) was an American figure skater. He competed in pairs and won two bronze medals at the U.S. Figure Skating Championships, the first with Patty Sonnekson in 1946 and another with Carolyn Welch the following year. Also in 1946, he won the Middle Atlantic men's figure skating title. He was later a ski instructor.

== Results ==
(Pairs with Sonneson)

Event	1946
U.S. Championships	3rd

(Pairs with Welch)

Event	1947
U.S. Championships	3rd

(Men's singles)

Event	1946	1947	1948
U.S. Championships	2nd J	3rd J	5th J
