= Carleton Hoffner Jr. =

American figure skater (1931–2020)

Figure skating career
- Country: United States
- Partner: Anne Davies
Medal record
Representing United States
Pairs' Figure skating
World Championships
Bronze medal – third place	1949 Paris	Pairs
Ice dancing
North American Championships
Bronze medal – third place	1949 Philadelphia	Ice dancing
Silver medal – second place	1947 Ottawa	Ice dancing

Carleton Crosby Hoffner Jr. (April 23, 1931 – April 21, 2020) was an American figure skater who competed in both ice dance and pairs with partner Anne Davies. They won the dance title at the 1946 U.S. Figure Skating Championships and won the bronze medal in pairs at the 1949 World Figure Skating Championships.

Hoffner died at home in Palo Alto on April 21, 2020, aged 88.

== Results ==
(Pairs with Davies)

Event	1949	1950
World Championships	3rd	
U.S. Championships	3rd	3rd

(Ice Dance with Davies)

Event	1945	1946	1947	1948	1949	1950
North American Championships			2nd		3rd	
U.S. Championships	3rd	1st	2nd	2nd		3rd

(Men's singles)

Event	1946	1947	1948	1949
U.S. Championships	4th J	4th J	7th J	8th J
