= Walter Bainbridge =

American figure skater (1930–2024)

Personal information
- Full name: Walter H. Bainbridge, Jr.
- Other names: Red
- Born: May 5, 1930 Corpus Christi, Texas, U.S.
- Died: September 22, 2024 (aged 94) Rockford, Illinois, U.S.

Figure skating career
- Country: United States
Medal record
Representing the United States
Ice dancing
North American Championships
Gold medal – first place	1949 Philadelphia	Ice dancing
Gold medal – first place	1947 Ottawa	Ice dancing

Walter "Red" H. Bainbridge Jr. (May 5, 1930 – September 22, 2024) was an American figure skater. He began skating in Washington state, when his father, geologist Walter H. Bainbridge, was posted there between 1938 and 1945. He competed in ice dance with Lois Waring. He was the national champion with Waring in 1947-1949 and North American Champion in 1947 and 1949. He was inducted into the Professional Skaters Association Hall of Fame in 2009.

Bainbridge died on September 22, 2024, at the age of 94.

== Results ==
(with Waring)

Event	1946	1947	1948	1949
North American Championships		1st		1st
U.S. Championships	2nd	1st	1st	1st

(Men's singles)

Event	1947	1948	1949
U.S. Championships	7th J	2nd J	11th J
