= Anne Davies (figure skater) =

American figure skater 91930–1995)

Personal information
- Born: December 21, 1930 Pennsylvania
- Died: February 25, 1995 (aged 64) Leesburg, Virginia

Figure skating career
- Country: United States
Medal record
Representing the United States
Pairs' Figure skating
World Championships
Bronze medal – third place	1949 Paris	Pairs
Ice dancing
North American Championships
Bronze medal – third place	1949 Philadelphia	Ice dancing
Silver medal – second place	1947 Ottawa	Ice dancing

Anne Davies Rieley (December 21, 1930 – February 25, 1995) was an American figure skater who competed in both ice dance and pairs with partner Carleton Hoffner. They won the dance title at the 1946 U.S. Figure Skating Championships and won the bronze medal in pairs at the 1949 World Figure Skating Championships.

== Results ==
(Pairs with Hoffner)

Event	1949	1950
World Championships	3rd	
U.S. Championships	3rd	3rd

(Ice Dance with Hoffner)

Event	1945	1946	1947	1948	1949	1950
North American Championships			2nd		3rd	
U.S. Championships	3rd	1st	2nd	2nd		3rd
