= Walter Muehlbronner =

German-American figure skater

Personal information
- Born: Walter Eugen Mühlbronner; 10 February 1922 Stuttgart, Germany
- Died: 17 November 2005 (aged 83) Blue Bell, Pennsylvania

Figure skating career
- Country: United States
Medal record
Representing United States
Pairs' Figure skating
North American Championships
| Bronze medal – third place | 1949 Philadelphia | Pairs |
Ice dancing Figure skating
North American Championships
| Silver medal – second place | 1949 Philadelphia | Ice dancing |

Walter Eugene Muehlbronner (born Walter Eugen Mühlbronner; 10 February 1922 – 17 November 2005) was a German-American figure skater. He became a U.S. citizen in 1946. He competed in pairs and ice dance with Irene Maguire, whom he married in 1951. They won national silver medals in both pairs and ice dance in 1949 and 1950. The two continued skating as professionals, billed as "Walter and Irene" for 7 years, in the Ice Follies.

In later years, he settled in Philadelphia, working first as a figure skating teacher, then as a skating club manager. He was president of the Professional Skaters Association for a few years in the early 1970s, and retired from skating in 1990.

== Results ==
(pairs with Maguire)

| Event | 1949 | 1950 |
|---|---|---|
| World Championships | 10th | |
| North American Championships | 3rd | |
| U.S. Championships | 2nd | 2nd |

(ice dance with Maguire)

| Event | 1949 | 1950 |
|---|---|---|
| North American Championships | 2nd | |
| U.S. Championships | 2nd | 2nd |
