= Susan Dymecki =

American geneticist (born 1960)

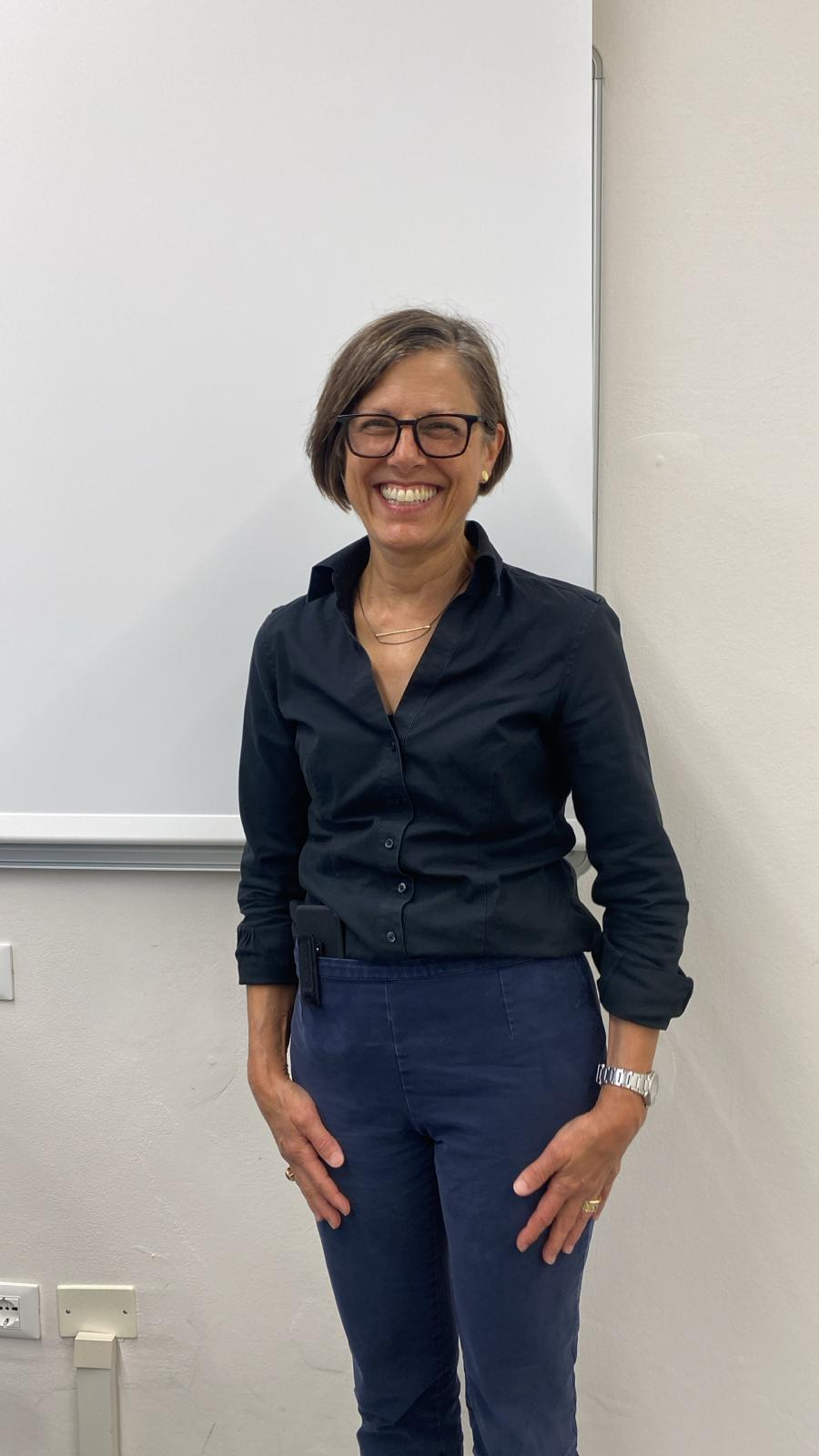
- Born: 19 June 1960 (age 66); Philadelphia, Pennsylvania, U.S.
- Education: University of Pennsylvania, Johns Hopkins University School of Medicine
- Known for: Flp-FRT genetic recombination tools, mapping serotonergic heterogeneity and function
- Awards: Rita Allen Foundation Scholar, Gulf Oil Outstanding Achievement in Biomedical Science Award, AAAS Member
- Scientific career
- Fields: Neuroscience, genetics
- Workplaces: Harvard Medical School

Susan M. Dymecki (born June 19, 1960) is an American geneticist and neuroscientist and director of the Biological and Biomedical Sciences PhD Program at Harvard University. Dymecki is also a professor in the Department of Genetics and the principal investigator of the Dymecki Lab at Harvard. Her lab characterizes the development and function of unique populations of serotonergic neurons in the mouse brain. To enable this functional dissection, Dymecki has pioneered several transgenic tools for probing neural circuit development and function. Dymecki also competed internationally as an ice dancer, placing 7th in the 1980 U.S. Figure Skating Championships.

== Early life and education ==
Dymecki was born in Philadelphia, Pennsylvania, on June 19, 1960. Before becoming a scientist, Dymecki was a competitive ice dancer. She started ice dancing when she was 13 years old and competed at the national level within the United States during high school.

Dymecki pursued a Bachelor of Science in Engineering at the University of Pennsylvania, and during this time she competed internationally in ice dancing. When Dymecki was 20 years old, she and her ice dancing partner ranked 6th in the United States. After taking a year off to compete, she completed her bachelor's degree and then stayed at UPenn to complete a Master of Science in Engineering. During her master's, she worked in the lab of Carl Theodore Brighton exploring the use of electric current in stimulating osteogenesis.

After completing her master's degree, she pursued her MD-PhD in 1985 at the Johns Hopkins School of Medicine, studying under Stephen Desiderio. During her PhD, Dymecki discovered a new gene expressed in B cells, called blk for B Lymphoid Kinase, which helps to initiate an immune response. After completing her MD-PhD training in 1992, Dymecki became a Helen Hay Whitney Fellow and John Merck Scholar at the Carnegie Institution for Science in the Department of Embryology in Washington, DC. While completing her postdoctoral training, she pioneered novel genetic tools with which to study development in the mammalian nervous system. In 1997, Dymecki filed a patent for her genetic tool, which consisted of DNA constructs that enable transgenic expression of FRT recombination sites and a Flp recombinase in non-human mammals. Her technology has aided many researchers in achieving gene insertion, deletion, and modulation as well as label cell lineages to explore developmental stages.

=== Identification of B Lymphoid Kinase ===
During graduate school, Dymecki isolated and characterized a novel gene, blk, named after B Lymphoid Kinase. This gene encodes a tyrosine kinase protein, and is specifically expressed in B cell lineages. Through further characterization of the transcriptional of blk, Dymecki found that none of its transcriptional start sites are preceded by TATA elements, AT-rich elements, or other common start site motifs. Dymecki also found that blk is expressed in pro-, pre-, and mature B cells, but not the antibody producing plasma cells.

=== Flp recombinase tool development ===
During Dymecki's postdoctoral work at the Carnegie Institute, she pioneered the development of novel vectors that enabled targeted genetic manipulation of specific populations of mammalian cells. Using Flp recombinase, Dymecki shows that her genetic constructs can be expressed in mammalian cells to activate specific genes. In a following paper in 1996, Dymecki showed that her tool not only worked in cell culture, but also in vivo in living transgenic mice to mediate gene insertion and deletion via recombination at FRT sites. Dymecki's paper was the inaugural paper to show that Flp technology could be used to make specific alterations to the mouse genome.

== Career and research ==
In 1998, Dymecki joined the faculty at Harvard Medical School and became an associate professor in the Department of Genetics. Dymecki's involvement with graduate education led her to become the associate director of the Biological and Biomedical Sciences PhD program in 2004. By 2010, Dymecki was promoted to full professor in the Department of Genetics, and the following year she became the director of the Biological and Biomedical Science PhD Program at Harvard.

As the principal investigator of the Dymecki Lab, Dymecki runs a research program dedicated to exploring the development and function of serotonin neurons in the rodent brain. Since Dymecki has found that serotonergic neurons are implicated in a wide range of critical processes from respiration, to thermal regulation, to emotional state, her research addresses fundamental questions about how the specific neural subtypes and circuits underlying these processes develop such that they can be targeted in the future to treat disease.

=== Innovation of Flp recombinase transgenic tools ===
After establishing Flp recombinase as an available genetic tool for site specific recombination in the mouse brain, Dymecki further optimized this tool. By creating the FLPe deleter strain, which uses an enhanced, thermostable version of Flp, Dymecki found that her tool was just as effective as the already established Cre-loxP tools. Since highly specific targeting of cell populations requires combinatorial genetic strategies, Dymecki's optimization enabled Flp and Cre to be used together in mammalian transgenic systems to perform highly targeted mutations. Following this optimization, Dymecki and her team created a FLPer (“flipper”) mouse line that has global, constitutive Flp expression that can be used to label specific cell populations, or to be crossed with other strains to create opportunities for cell-type specific conditional knockouts.

=== Serotonergic diversity in mouse brain ===
Dymecki's lab uses their transgenic tools to probe the diversity of serotonin neurons in the central nervous system. Using a variety of genetic profiling and developmental mapping techniques, Dymecki and her team were able to identify various subpopulations of serotonin neurons within the brainstem, and show the immense transcriptional diversity both between and within anatomically defined subpopulations of serotonin neurons. They also found that these transcriptional, anatomical, and molecular differences, lead to differences in function.

=== Serotonin neurons in aggression ===
Narrowing in on specific subtypes of serotonin neurons has enabled Dymecki and her team to identify the unique behaviors modulated by specific populations of serotonin neurons. For example, the Pet1+ serotonin neurons that also express either dopamine receptor 1 or dopamine receptor 2 were shown to be implicated in aggression. When these neural subtypes were silenced, male aggressive behavior in mice was increased, suggesting the unique role played in a behavior by a very specific population of brainstem serotonergic neurons. Dymecki and her colleagues then found that serotonergic neurons also mediate aggression in Drosophila. They found two serotonergic projections, a GABAergic projection that decreased aggression when stimulated, and a cholinergic projection that increased aggression when stimulated.

=== Serotonin in respiration ===
Dymecki and her team have characterized the role of serotonin neurons in the regulation of breathing dynamics. By chemogenetically manipulating single sub-populations of serotonin neurons, they found one population, expressing Egr1-Pet1 that increases ventilation in response to acidosis. Following this study, Dymecki and her colleagues identified another unique serotonin population, this time characterized by Tac1-Pet1 that are also implicated in driving ventilation but differ in their projection targets and methods of sensing inhaled CO_{2}.

== Awards and honors ==
- 2018 Elected Member of the American Academy of Arts and Sciences
- 2017 A. Clifford Barger Excellence in Mentoring Award
- 2016 Rita Allen Scientific Advisory Committee
- 2012 Distinguished Investigator Grantees Brain and Behavior Research
- 2004 Biological and Biomedical Sciences Ph.D. Program mentoring award
- 1999 Rita Allen Foundation Alumna Scholar
- Harvard Medical School Morgan-Zinsser Teaching Faculty Fellowship Award
- Gulf Oil Outstanding Achievement in Biomedical Science Award
- Helen Hay Whitney Fellow
- John Merck Scholar

== Select publications ==
- Serotonergic Modulation of Aggression in Drosophila Involves GABAergic and Cholinergic Opposing Pathways. Alekseyenko OV, Chan YB, Okaty BW, Chang Y, Dymecki SM, Kravitz EA. Curr Biol 2019-06-18
- Embracing diversity in the 5-HT neuronal system. Okaty BW, Commons KG, Dymecki SM. Nat Rev Neurosci 2019-04-04
- Acute perturbation of Pet1-neuron activity in neonatal mice impairs cardiorespiratory homeostatic recovery. Dosumu-Johnson RT, Cocoran AE, Chang Y, Nattie E, Dymecki SM. Elife 2018-10-23
- Sexual dimorphism of microglia and synapses during mouse postnatal development. Weinhard L, Neniskyte U, Vadisiute A, di Bartolomei G, Aygün N, Riviere L, Zonfrillo F, Dymecki S, Gross C. Dev Neurobiol 2018-06-01
- Activity of Tachykinin1-Expressing Pet1 Raphe Neurons Modulates the Respiratory Chemoreflex. Hennessy ML, Corcoran AE, Brust RD, Chang Y, Nattie EE, Dymecki SM. J Neurosci 2017-02-15
- Impaired respiratory and body temperature control upon acute serotonergic neuron inhibition. Ray RS, Corcoran AE, Brust RD, Kim JC, Richerson GB, Nattie E, Dymecki SM. Science 2011-07-29
- Linking genetically defined neurons to behavior through a broadly applicable silencing allele. Kim JC, Cook MN, Carey MR, Shen C, Regehr WG, Dymecki SM. Neuron 2009-08-13
- Molecularly and temporally separable lineages form the hindbrain roof plate and contribute differentially to the choroid plexus. Hunter NL, Dymecki SM. Development 2007-10-01
- Assembly of the brainstem cochlear nuclear complex is revealed by intersectional and subtractive genetic fate maps. Farago AF, Awatramani RB, Dymecki SM. Neuron 2006-04-20
- Hindbrain rhombic lip is composed of discrete progenitor cell populations allocated by Pax6. Landsberg RL, Awatramani RB, Hunter NL, Farago AF, DiPietrantonio HJ, Rodriguez CI, Dymecki SM. Neuron 2005-12-22
- Origin of the precerebellar system. Rodriguez CI, Dymecki SM. Neuron 2000-09-01
- High-efficiency deleter mice show that FLPe is an alternative to Cre-loxP. Rodríguez CI, Buchholz F, Galloway J, Sequerra R, Kasper J, Ayala R, Stewart AF, Dymecki SM. Nat Genet 2000-06-01
- Flp recombinase promotes site-specific DNA recombination in embryonic stem cells and transgenic mice. Dymecki SM. Proc Natl Acad Sci U S A 1996-06-11
- A modular set of Flp, FRT and lacZ fusion vectors for manipulating genes by site-specific recombination. Dymecki SM. Gene 1996-06-01
- Specific expression of a tyrosine kinase gene, blk, in B lymphoid cells. Dymecki SM, Niederhuber JE, Desiderio SV. Science 1990-01-19
