= Cheyenne Mountain High School =

Public high school in Colorado Springs, Colorado, U.S.

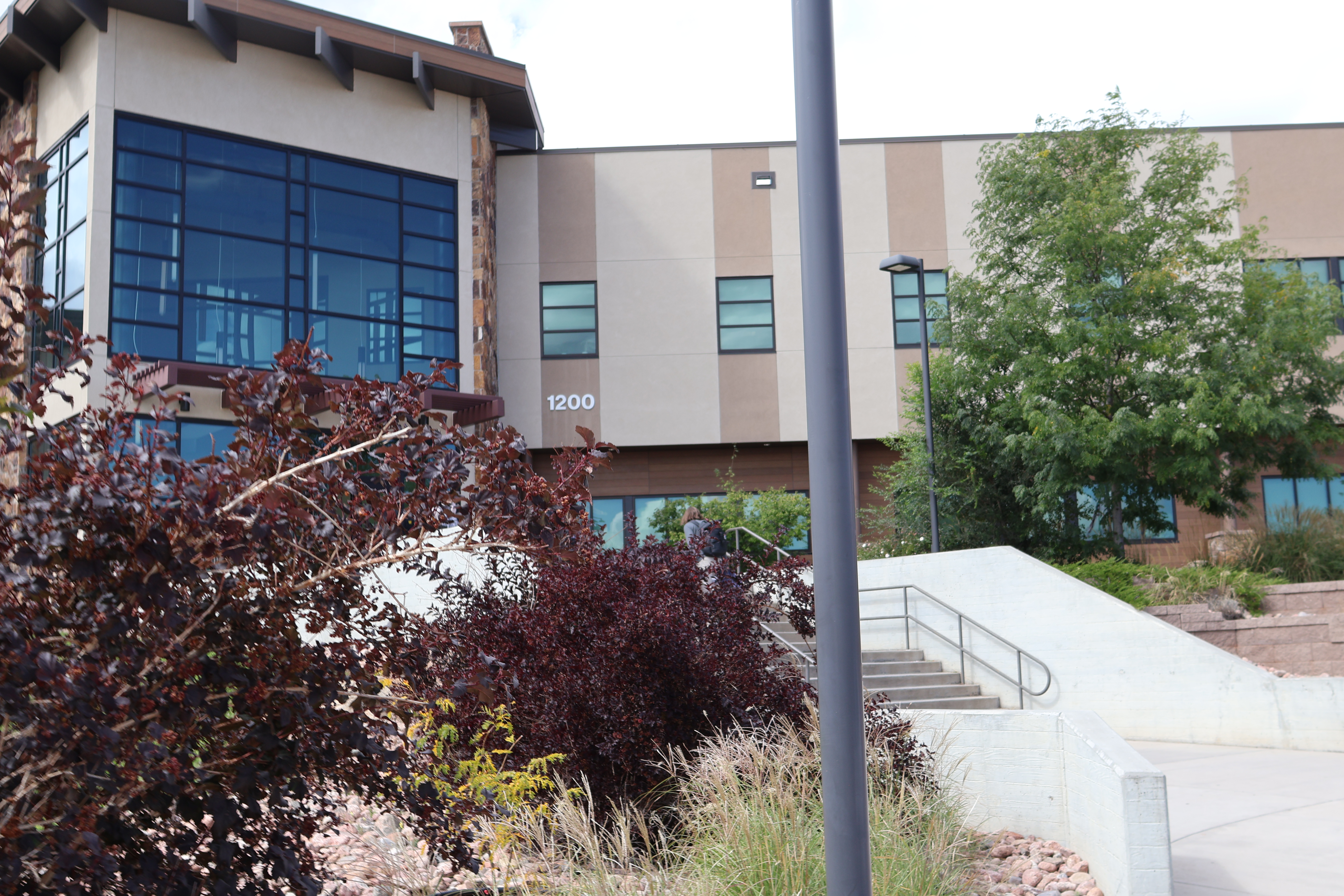
- Campus of Cheyenne Mountain High School in 2025

Location
- 1200 Cresta Road; Colorado Springs, Colorado 80906; United States; 38°48′17″N 104°51′30″W

Information
- Former name: Cheyenne Mountain District Twelve
- Type: Public high school
- Established: 1872; 154 years ago
- School district: Cheyenne Mountain School District 12
- Superintendent: David Peak
- CEEB code: 060268
- NCES School ID: 080294000211
- Principal: Carrie Brenner
- Teaching staff: 75.30 (on an FTE basis) (2023−2024)
- Grades: 9–12
- Gender: Coeducational
- Enrollment: 1,268 (2023–2024)
- Student to teacher ratio: 16.84
- Campus type: Suburban
- Colors: Maroon and white
- Athletics conference: Colorado High School Activities Association
- Mascot: Red-Tailed Hawk
- Feeder schools: Cheyenne Mountain Junior High
- Website: cmhs.cmsd12.org

Cheyenne Mountain High School is a comprehensive public high school in Colorado Springs, Colorado, United States. Founded as Cheyenne Mountain District Twelve (D12), it graduated its first class in 1872. Operated by the Cheyenne Mountain School District 12, it is the only high school in the school district.

Cheyenne Mountain High School was established in 1872, serving as a single room schoolhouse for children of ranchers near Cheyenne Creek. In 1874, Cheyenne Mountain High School was moved to a location near to where The Broadmoor would ultimately be built in order to accommodate more students in the Broadmoor area. The high school was moved again in 1962, with a total of 359 students, and in 2005, the old administrative building was converted into the Cheyenne Mountain Heritage Center. Extracurricular activities include a speech and debate team, theater, yearbook, equestrianism, and other sports. The school is an annual recipient of the John Irwin School of Excellence & Governor's Distinguished Improvement Award, and a two-time National Blue Ribbon School. In competitions such as the International Championship of High School A Cappella, the school has won titles. The Cheyenne Mountain High School has participated in the past at national venues and conferences, including the National Scholastic Arts Competition and the National Bands of America Concert Festival.

Notable alumni include multiple U.S. Olympic gold medalists, as well as professional athletes, such as former National Football League (NFL) player Matt Darwin and Major League Baseball (MLB) players Brandon McCarthy and Dave Mlicki. In addition, Cheyenne Mountain has educated a Medal of Honor recipient, Floyd K. Lindstrom.

== History ==
=== Development ===
Cheyenne Mountain High School, formerly District Twelve, was named after the Cheyenne Mountain and the Cheyenne indigenous people, and was opened in 1872. The Cheyenne Mountain Indian was its mascot. The first school year lasted three months, and the school had exactly one teacher and about nine students.

In 1876, as more families settled in the Colorado Territory, District 12 constructed an additional six classrooms. The school hosted grades one through twelve, and the school year was expanded to about seven months. Thereafter, the Colorado Springs and Interurban Railway System was established and serviced the Cheyenne Mountain Country Club, bringing more families to the area. In 1899, construction of a new larger school began due to the growing number of students. The school was relocated to its present location in 1968.

=== Mascot ===
The Cheyenne Mountain Indian was the mascot of the high school, which was subject to controversy, and as a result, over a dozen Native American students and multiple Native American tribal leaders voiced their concern to the school in 2021. On March 7, 2021, the school board voted to retire the current high school mascot, a Indigenous Cheyenne Mountain Native American from the North American Great Plains wearing a traditional feathered headdress. On July 7, 2021, the school board adopted the red-tailed hawk as the new mascot.

== Academics ==
=== Enrollment ===
As of the 2024–25 school year, Cheyenne Mountain High School had an enrollment of 1,268 students and 75.30 classroom teachers (on an FTE basis), for a student–teacher ratio of 16.84. The teacher population has declined by 5.0 percent in a span of five years.

Despite the school's rather stable enrollment since 1872, 15 percent of students are economically disadvantaged. The total minority enrollment is 30 percent. As of the 2024–25 school year, the largest racial/ethnic group at the high school are White Americans, followed by Hispanic and Latino Americans and then by multiracial Americans.

=== Awards ===
The school is an annual recipient of the John Irwin School of Excellence and a two-time National Blue Ribbon School. The 2024 U.S News & World Report of high school rankings listed Cheyenne Mountain as #849 in its National Rankings and #24 in its Colorado high school rankings. It was also rated the #1 school in Colorado by Niche.com in 2020 and 2025.

=== Curriculum ===
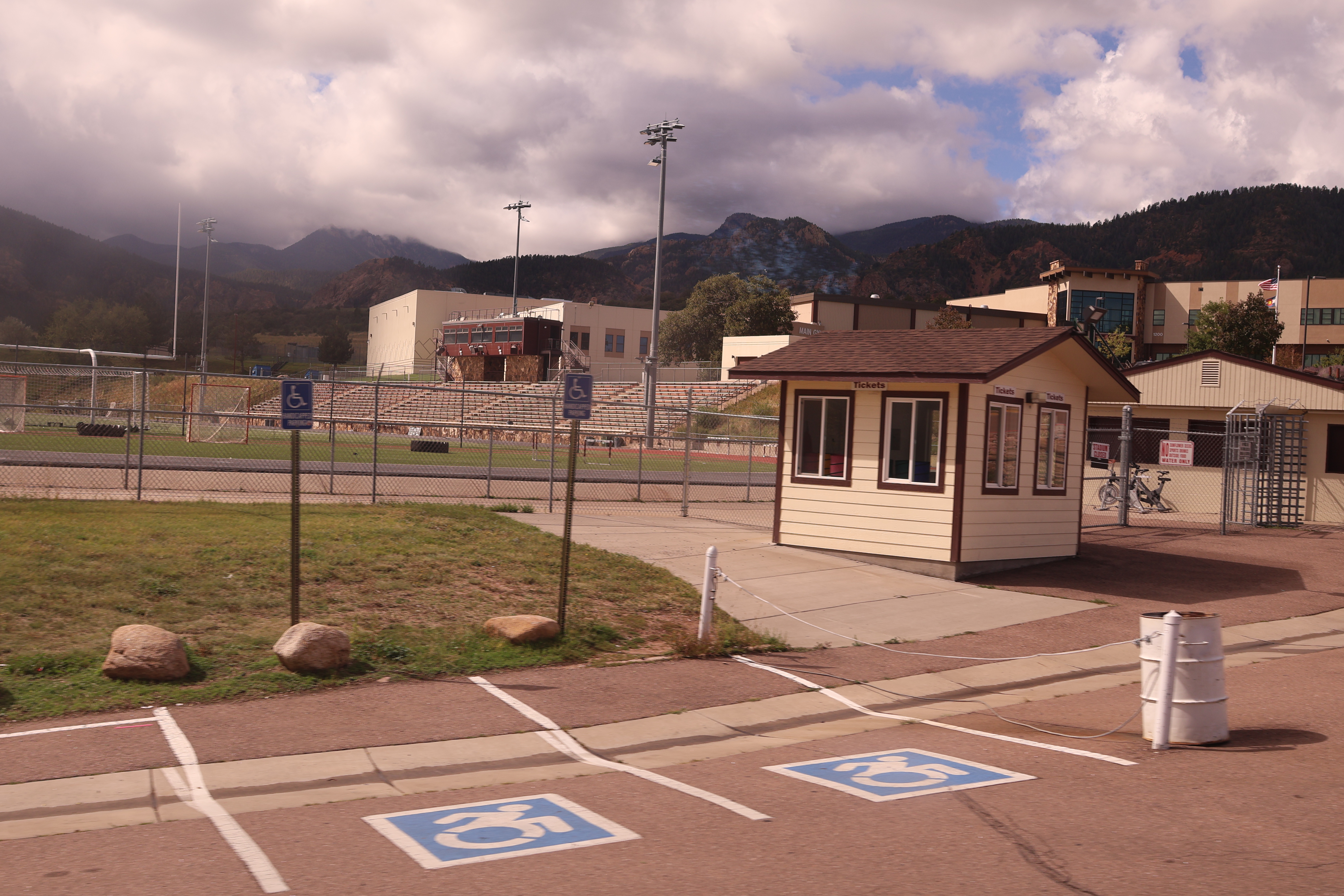
Stadium at the high school

The minimum graduation requirements for Cheyenne Mountain include eight semesters of English; six semesters of math, science, and social science; one semester of health; physical education; and one year of fine arts. Cheyenne recommends students take at least two years of a foreign language. In 2024, 95.0 percent of the student body achieved and met graduation standards.

As of 2025, the school's curriculum offered 32 Advanced Placement (AP) classes. This includes STEM fields (science, technology, engineering, mathematics), social sciences, visual and performing arts, and language courses and their literature complements in English and Spanish. The school's honors and AP classes are offered under a "withdraw fail, withdraw pass" policy; students are encouraged to take advanced courses if they feel like they can.

== Extracurricular activities ==
=== Athletics ===
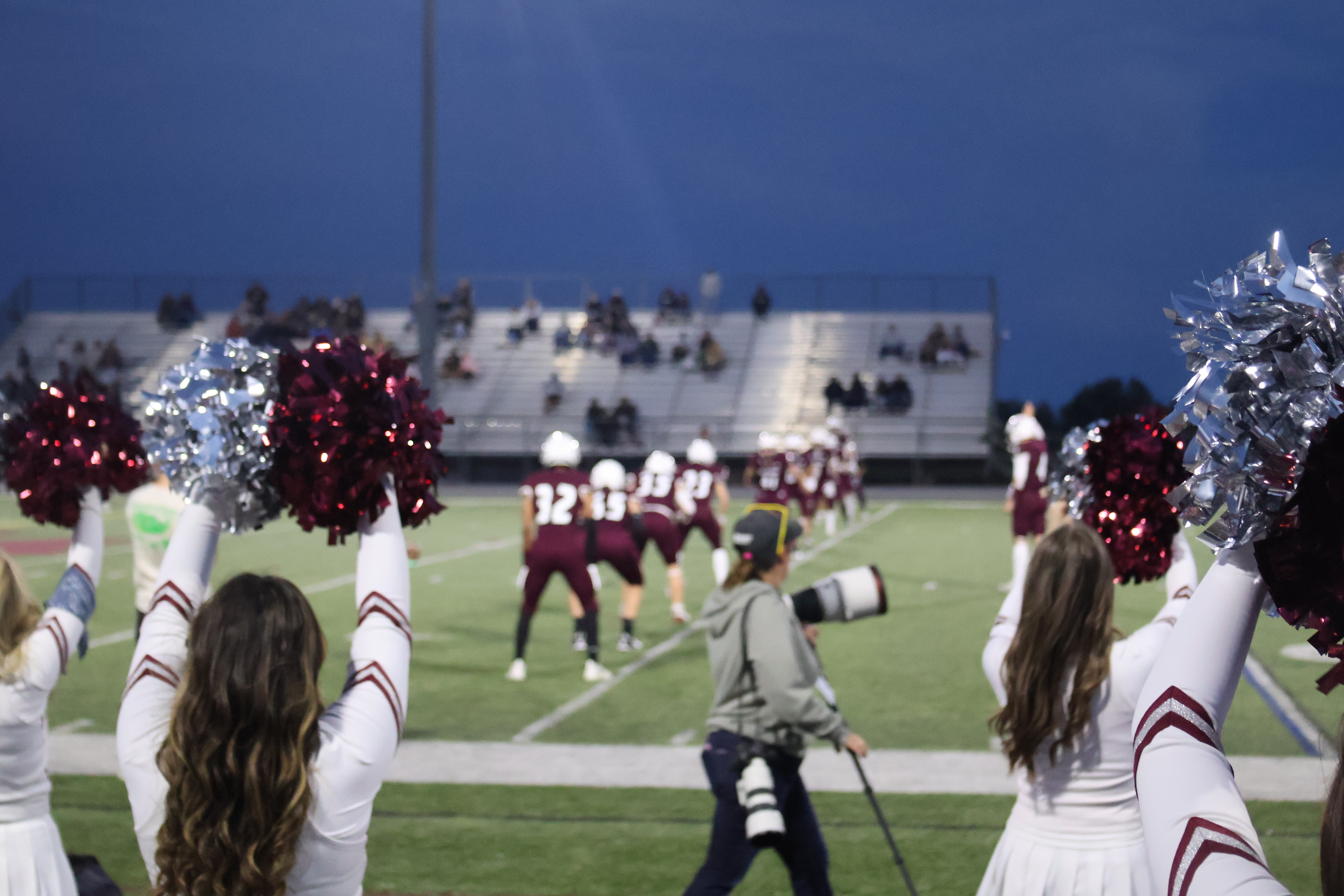
Cheyenne Mountain cheerleaders and football team

In 2025, the school offered a variety of athletic sport teams. The sports are run under the Cheyenne Mountain Athletics Boosters, and include ice hockey (boys), tennis, cheer, cross country, soccer, swimming, golf, lacrosse, field hockey (girls), football (boys), baseball (boys), track and field, basketball, volleyball (girls), and wrestling. The school provides both facilities and an athletic trainer to accommodate the sport teams. The school's athletic rival is the Air Academy High School.

As of 2025, Cheyenne Mountain High School has won over 100 state championships: the most in the entire Colorado Springs metropolitan area. Cheyenne Mountain competes in the Colorado High School Activities Association (CHSAA). Several school athletic teams have won multiple 4A titles, including baseball (boys), basketball (boys and girls), cheerleading, and cross country, in addition to football, golf (boys), ice hockey (boys), lacrosse (boys), track, soccer (girls and boys), swimming (girls and boys), tennis (girls and boys), volleyball (girls), and wrestling (boys). In 2023, the cross country team recorded the second fastest team average in high school history.

=== Civic engagement and clubs ===
Cheyenne Mountain High School's civic engagement teams emphasize public speaking. The school hosts a competition, governed by the Colorado High School Activities Association (CHSAA), known as the "Dragon's Backbone" speech and debate competition. The competition lasts over twelve hours and features 28 schools from Colorado. Other featured clubs at Cheyenne Mountain include the Cheyenne Mountain Equestrian Team, theater, and yearbook.

=== Music ===
The A Cappella, jazz and show choirs compete on Colorado High School Activities Association (CHSAA) circuit. The band performs at local high school football games and global competitions. The school's A Capella Crimson was the International Championship of High School A Capella champions in both 2005 and 2025, and runner-up in 2006 and 2007. The Cheyenne A Cappella Slate was the International Championship of High School A Capella runner-up in 2006. In 2021, a student from Cheyenne Mountain recorded and edited a 22-minute film achieving 3,000 views on YouTube to raise money for refugees and spread global awareness about the war in Ukraine by using piano.

== Notable alumni ==
=== Broadmoor Skating Club ===
Notable Cheyenne alumni who trained at the Broadmoor Skating Club include the following figure skaters and Olympians.

- Max Aaron: 2013 U.S. national champion
- Jeremy Abbott: 2014 Olympic bronze medalist, 2008 Grand Prix Final gold medalist, two-time Four Continents Championship bronze medalist (2007, 2011), and four-time U.S. national champion (2009–10, 2012, 2014)
- Rachael Flatt: 2008 World Junior Champion gold medalist and 2010 U.S. national champion
- Peggy Fleming: 1968 Olympic gold medalist, three-time World Championship gold medalist (1966–68)
- Alexe Gilles: 2008 Junior Grand Prix Final bronze medalist
- Piper Gilles: four-time World Championship medalist (two silver, two bronze), two-time Four Continents Championship gold medalist (2024–25), 2022 Grand Prix Final gold medalist, four-time Canadian national champion
- David Jenkins: 1960 Olympic gold medalist, 1956 Olympic bronze medalist, three-time World Championship gold medalist, and four-time U.S. national champion
- Caryn Kadavy: 1987 World Championship bronze medalist, four-time U.S. national medalist (one silver, three bronze)
- Ann Patrice McDonough: 2002 World Junior Championship gold medalist and 2000 Junior Grand Prix Final gold medalist
- Keauna McLaughlin: 2010 Four Continents Championship silver medalist, 2007 World Junior Championship gold medalist, 2006 Junior Grand Prix gold medalist, two-time U.S. national champion (2008–09)
- Brandon Mroz: two-time Junior Grand Prix Final silver medalist (2007–08), 2009 U.S. national silver medalist
- Alex Shibutani: two-time 2018 Olympic bronze medalist, three-time World Championship medalist (one silver, two bronze), 2016 Four Continents Championship gold medalist, two-time Grand Prix Final bronze medalist (2016–17), 2009 World Junior Championship silver medalist, 2009 Junior Grand Prix Final bronze medalist, and two-time U.S. national champion (2016–17)
- Jill Trenary: 1990 World Championship gold medalist, 1989 World Championship bronze medalist, three-time U.S. national champion (1987, 1989–90), U.S. Figure Skating Hall of Fame
- Stephanie Westerfeld: 1961 U.S. national silver medalist
- Agnes Zawadzki: two-time Junior Grand Prix Final medalist (one silver, one bronze), and two-time U.S. national championship bronze medalist (2012–13)

=== Olympic and professional athletes ===
- Canyon Barry: shooting guard for the Iowa Wolves (NBA G League)
- Matt Darwin: tackle for the Philadelphia Eagles
- Amro El Geziry: 2020 Olympic competitor in the men's pentathlon (for the United States); Olympic competitor in the men's pentathlon (2008, 2012, and 2016 for Egypt)
- Amber English: 2020 Olympic gold medalist in the women's skeet
- Brandon McCarthy: Major League Baseball (MLB) pitcher
- Dave Mlicki: Major League Baseball (MLB) pitcher

=== Other ===
- Floyd K. Lindstrom: Medal of Honor recipient of the United States Army
- John Arthur Love: former governor of Colorado (1963−1973)
