= Jeri Campbell =

American figure skater

Jeri Campbell (born 1970) is an American former figure skater in ladies' singles. She won the Junior title at the 1987 U.S. Figure Skating Championships, and was an alternate for the 1988 Winter Olympic Games after finishing fourth at the 1988 U.S. Figure Skating Championships.

== Career ==
At the U.S. Figure Skating Championships, Campbell was second on the novice level in 1984 and won the junior title in 1987, ahead of Kristi Yamaguchi (second) and Tonia Kwiatkowski (third). She finished fourth at the 1988 U.S. Figure Skating Championships behind Debi Thomas, Jill Trenary and Caryn Kadavy, and was named an alternate to the Olympic team. She won the 1987 Golden Spin of Zagreb and the 1988 Skate Electric Challenge in the UK (not to be confused with the St. Ivel/Skate Electric International). At the 1989 U.S. Championships she placed second in the compulsories and sixth in the short program before withdrawing before the long program.

Campbell turned professional in 1991 and went on to work in several shows, including Dorothy Hamill's Cinderalla on Ice tour (1993–94), for two years as Dorothy in the North American tour of The Wizard of Oz on Ice (1995–97), and touring the United Kingdom with the Torvill and Dean Winter Express tour (1997–98).

Since 2000, Campbell has worked as a coach and choreographer.

== Competitive highlights ==
International
Event	1984–85	1985–86	1986–87	1987–88	1988–89	1989–90	1990–91
Skate America					5th		
Internat. de Paris					4th		
Golden Spin				1st			
National
U.S. Championships	7th J.	7th J.	1st J.	4th	WD	5th	9th
