= 1987 U.S. Figure Skating Championships =

Figure skating competition

- Type: National Championship
- Date: January
- Season: 1986–87
- Location: Tacoma, Washington

Champions
- Men's singles: Brian Boitano
- Ladies' singles: Jill Trenary
- Pairs: Jill Watson / Peter Oppegard
- Ice dance: Suzanne Semanick / Scott Gregory
- Previous: 1986 U.S. Championships
- Next: 1988 U.S. Championships

The 1987 U.S. Figure Skating Championships took place in January 1987 at the Tacoma Dome in Tacoma, Washington. Medals were awarded in four colors: gold (first), silver (second), bronze (third), and pewter (fourth) in four disciplines – men's singles, ladies' singles, pair skating, and ice dancing – across three levels: senior, junior, and novice.

The event was one of the criteria used to select the U.S. teams for the 1987 World Championships.

== Senior results ==
=== Men ===
Rank	Name	CF	SP	FS
1	Brian Boitano	1	1	1
2	Christopher Bowman	5	2	2
3	Scott Williams	3	3	4
4	Daniel Doran	2	4	5
5	Paul Wylie	4	7	3
6	Angelo d'Agostino	7	5	6
7	Scott Kurttila	9	8	7
8	Rudy Galindo	10	6	8
9	James Cygan	8	9	9
10	Doug Mattis	6	14	12
11	Erik Larson	11	10	11
12	Stephen Rice	13	11	10
13	Tom Zakrajsek	12	12	15
14	David Liu	17	13	13
15	Mark Mitchell	14	15	14
16	Eddie Shipstad	15	17	17
17	Jon Robinson	18	16	16
18	Troy Goldstein	16	18	18

=== Ladies ===
Rank	Name	CF	SP	FS
1	Jill Trenary	2	2	1
2	Debi Thomas	1	1	2
3	Caryn Kadavy	3	9	3
4	Tiffany Chin	4	3	5
5	Tonya Harding	8	7	4
6	Cindy Bortz	9	4	6
7	Tracey Damigella	5	8	7
8	Holly Cook	7	5	9
9	Kathryn Adams	6	13	11
10	Yvonne Gomez	11	11	10
11	Julie Wasserman	12	6	12
12	Rory Flack	19	10	8
13	Kelly Ann Szmurlo	10	14	15
14	Carrie Weber	17	12	13
15	Elisa Scheuerman	15	15	14
16	Dawn Victorson	13	20	17
17	Lily Lee	18	18	16
18	Danielle-Alyse Babaian	16	19	18
19	Joan Colignon	14	17	20
20	Micki McMahon	20	16	19

=== Pairs ===
Rank	Name	SP	FS
1	Jill Watson / Peter Oppegard	2	1
2	Gillian Wachsman / Todd Waggoner	1	3
3	Katy Keeley / Joseph Mero	4	2
4	Natalie Seybold / Wayne Seybold	3	4
5	Kristi Yamaguchi / Rudy Galindo	8	5
6	Calla Urbanski / Michael Blicharski	6	6
7	Ashley Stevenson / Scott Wendland	7	7
8	Heidi Franks / Luke Hohmann	12	8
9	Maria Lako / Joel McKeever	10	10
10	Karen Courtland / Joshua Roberts	5	12
11	Elaine Asanakis / Christopher Hefner	13	9
12	Sharon Carz / Doug Williams	11	11
13	Kellee Murchison / Robert Pellaton	9	14
14	April Malakoff / Rocky Marval	14	13
15	Sherry Kern / Michael Kern	15	15

=== Ice dancing ===
Rank	Name
1	Suzanne Semanick / Scott Gregory
2	Renée Roca / Donald Adair
3	Susan Wynne / Joseph Druar
4	April Sargent / Russ Witherby
5	Karen Knieriem / Leif Erickson
6	Ann Hensel / James Yorke
7	Jill Aleisa Heiser / Michael Verlich
8	Dorothy Rodek / Robert Nardozza
9	Colette Huber / Ron Kravette
10	Jodie Balogh / Jerod Swallow
11	Tracy Sniadach / John D'Amelio
12	Laura Everngam / Jerry Santoferrara
13	Beth McLean / Ari Lieb
14	Tonia Kleinsasser / Daniel Stahl
15	Jeanne Miley / Anthony Bardin

== Junior results ==
=== Men ===
Rank	Name	CF	SP	FS
1	Todd Eldredge		6	2
2	Patrick Brault		1	1
3	Craig Heath			
...				
5	Shepherd Clark			
...				
11	Aren Nielsen			
...				

=== Ladies ===
Rank	Name
1	Jeri Campbell
2	Kristi Yamaguchi
3	Tonia Kwiatkowski
4	Nancy Kerrigan
...	

=== Pairs ===
Rank	Name
1	Kellie Creel / David McGovern
2	Michelle Laughlin / Mark Naylor
3	Julianne Thompson / Brian Geddeis
4	Sara Powell / Robert Powell
5	Lara Dunlap / John Denton
6	Wendy Weston / David Goodman
7	Paula Visingardi / Jeffrey Meyers
...	

=== Ice dancing ===
Rank	Name
1	Jennifer Benz / Jeffrey Benz

== Novice results ==
=== Men ===
Rank	Name
1	John Baldwin Jr.
2	Damon Allen

=== Ladies ===
Rank	Name
1	Amy Holmberg
2	Berkley Villard

! 3 | Tarah Donelan |}
