= Denise Benning =

Canadian pair skater

Personal information
- Born: September 1, 1967 (age 58) Windsor, Ontario
- Height: 155 cm (5 ft 1 in)

Figure skating career
- Country: Canada
- Discipline: Pair skating
- Partner: Lyndon Johnston
- Retired: 1988

Denise Benning-Reid, née Benning, (born September 1, 1967) is a Canadian former competitive pair skater. With her skating partner, Lyndon Johnston, she is the 1985 NHK Trophy bronze medalist, the 1985 Skate Canada International bronze medalist, the 1986 Skate America silver medalist, and a three-time Canadian national medalist (silver in 1986 and 1987, bronze in 1988). The pair finished fifth at three consecutive World Championships and sixth at the 1988 Winter Olympics in Calgary.

Benning also won three consecutive national fours titles with Johnston and other skaters from 1986 to 1988.

== Early life ==
Benning was born in Windsor, Ontario on September 1, 1967 and moved to Tecumseh with her family in 1970. The family moved back in 1982. She has a younger sister.

== Career ==
Benning began skating at age 7 and started to compete by age 9. At age 14, she first tried pair skating while training in Kitchener, Ontario during the summer. Beginning that fall, she commuted to Kitchener from her hometown of Windsor, training Thursday through Saturday and boarding with a local family. She moved to Preston, Ontario in 1985, when she was 17.

She initially paired up with Alan Kerslake. They competed at Benning's first Canadian National Championships in 1983, where they placed 4th in the novice category. They were the 1984 novice Canadian champions, then won bronze in 1985 at the junior level.

After Lyndon Johnston's previous partner, Melinda Kunhegyi, retired from competition to focus on school, Benning paired up with him in mid-September 1985. She learned the short program Johnston and Kunhegyi had prepared in an hour, and less than a week after they paired up, Skate Canada asked if they had a long program ready, which they performed for officials less than two weeks later. They had only been skating together for five weeks when they were named to the 1985 Skate Canada International team a week before the event. The pair's large height difference - Johnston was 5 ft 11 in (1.80 m) and Benning 5 ft 1 in (1.55 m) - caused difficulties with their timing, and Johnston initially had issues with pulled muscles in his back.

The pair placed 3rd at Skate Canada, then placed third again at the NHK Trophy. At their first Canadian Championships together, they won the short program. In the free skate, however, they had issues on 8 of their 15 elements and finished in second place overall. The pair were also part of the winning four skating group.

They were assigned to the 1986 World Championships, where they placed 6th in the short program. Johnston had hurt his neck ahead of the competition and required a cervical collar when he wasn't skating, and he had a pulled muscle in his thigh, which he aggravated during their free skate. However, the pair moved up a place after the free skate to finish in 5th place.

The next season, the pair won the silver medal at Skate America. Afterward, having been given feedback that their free program needed improvement, they reworked the majority of the program, adding music from Swan Lake and removing pauses in the choreography. Two weeks later, they placed 3rd in the short program at Skate Canada International. Benning expressed happiness with their placement and said, "After a performance like that, it leaves you with a lot of confidence." However, in the free skate, they had problems with multiple jumps and fell to 5th place overall.

At the Canadian Championships, Benning fell on their side-by-side double loop jumps in the short program. She characterized it as a fluke mistake, saying, "It wasn't one of those misses because I was out of it, in fact I was really into the routine." They went into the free skate in third place but moved up to win the silver medal. In the fours event, they won a second consecutive title. At the 1987 World Championships, they placed 6th in the short program and moved up to 5th after the free skate. They were the highest-ranked Canadian pair at the competition, and their placement meant that Canada could enter three pairs at the upcoming 1988 Winter Olympics. Benning comforted and expressed sympathy for fellow competitor Cynthia Coull, skating with Mark Rowsom; the pair had been 4th in the short program, ahead of Benning and Johnston, but fell to 6th after a difficult free skate in which Coull fell and missed a number of subsequent elements.

At the beginning of the 1987–1988 season, Benning and Johnston competed at the St. Ivel International. Despite Benning falling three times in their free skate, the pair won the gold medal and received the highest artistic scores of the competition. Benning said of the competition, "Tonight definitely wasn't our best performance, but it's something we can use as a learning experience."

The pair created a new free program ahead of the central Canadian divisional championships, using music from Carmen. Benning noted that she enjoyed the character of the titular Carmen and that the program would not end with her dying, as Carmen does in the opera: "I refuse to die." They were the favorites to win the 1988 Canadian Championships but instead finished 3rd after Benning fell on two throw jumps. They won a third national title in the fours event.

At the 1988 Winter Olympics, held in the pair's home country of Canada, Benning felt nervous before their program but was able to calm down with help from the team's sports psychologist, who asked fellow Canadian skater Brian Orser to tell her about his experience at the 1984 Winter Olympics. They finished in 6th place, the highest ranking of the Canadian pairs. A newspaper in Benning's hometown, The Windsor Star, received criticism for a photo of the pair they placed on their front page, which depicted the pair performing a unique spin and which was called "unacceptable" and "in poor taste". This led the paper to publish an editorial explaining that they only had access to two photos of Benning and her partner, and only one of those was in color, which they selected. The lead editor also discussed the limitations on their photographer at the Games. Benning's mother asked for a print of the photo and said she was glad for the local support shown to her daughter.

Ahead of the 1988 World Championships, Benning and Johnston changed their short program to remove a throw jump and replace it with a lift, as Benning was more skilled with lifts. They again placed 6th in the short program and moved up to 5th place after the free skate.

Following the end of the season, Benning considered moving to a professional skating career or continuing her education. In May, she announced she would no longer wished to compete and that Johnston would be continuing with a new partner, as they had not found any offers for professional ice shows that they were interested in taking.

== Post-competitive career ==
Benning married Paul Reid, with whom she has two children. She received a degree in sports administration from the University of Windsor and has worked as a part-time coach and in event management. She was inducted into the Windsor/Essex Sports Hall of Fame in 2003. In 2024, she and Johnston were also inducted into the Cambridge Sports Hall of Fame.

== Results ==
=== Pairs with Lyndon Johnston ===
International
Event	1985–86	1986–87	1987–88
Winter Olympics			6th
World Championships	5th	5th	5th
NHK Trophy	3rd		
Skate America		2nd	
Skate Canada	3rd	5th	
St. Ivel International			1st
National
Canadian Championships	2nd	2nd	3rd
