= 1986 Skate America =

- Season: 1986–87
- Location: Portland, Maine
- Host: U.S. Figure Skating
- Venue: Cumberland County Civic Center

Champions
- Men's singles: (United States) Brian Boitano
- Ladies' singles: (United States) Tiffany Chin
- Pairs: (United States) Katy Keely / Joseph Mero
- Ice dance: (France) Isabelle Duchesnay / Paul Duchesnay
- Previous: 1985 Skate America
- Next: 1988 Skate America

The 1986 Skate America was held at the Cumberland County Civic Center in Portland, Maine. Medals were awarded in the disciplines of men's singles, ladies' singles, pair skating, and ice dancing.

== Results ==
=== Men ===
Rank	Name	Nation	TFP	CF	SP	FS
1	Brian Boitano	United States	2.0	1	1	1
2	Viktor Petrenko	Soviet Union			2	2
3	Daniel Doran	United States			3	3
4	Grzegorz Filipowski	Poland			5	4
5	Heiko Fischer	West Germany			9	7
6	Matthew Hall	Canada			7	5
7	Paul Wylie	United States			8	6
8	Tatsuya Fujii	Japan			4	10
9	Cameron Medhurst	Australia			13	9
10	Philippe Roncoli	France			11	8
11	Oliver Höner	Switzerland			6	14
12	Alessandro Riccitelli	Italy			15	11
13	Jaimee Eggleton	Canada			10	12
14	Peter Johansson	Sweden			12	13
15	Oula Jaaskelainen	Finland			14	15

=== Ladies ===
Rank	Name	Nation	TFP	CF	SP	FS
1	Tiffany Chin	United States	3.4	1	2	2
2	Tonya Harding	United States	6.2	8	1	1
3	Agnès Gosselin	France	6.6	4	3	3
4	Tracey Damigella	United States	7.2	2	5	4
5	Patricia Schmidt	Canada		3		8
6	Natalia Gorbenko	Soviet Union			4	
7	Sachie Yuki	Japan				
8	Pamela Giangualano	Canada				
9	Tamara Teglassy	Hungary				
10	Zeljka Cizmesija	Yugoslavia				
11	Lotta Falkenback	Sweden				
12	Pauline Lee	Chinese Taipei				

=== Pairs ===
Rank	Name	Nation	TFP	SP	FS
1	Katy Keeley / Joseph Mero	United States	2.2	3	1
2	Denise Benning / Lyndon Johnston	Canada	2.8	2	2
3	Lyudmila Koblova / Andrei Kalitin	Soviet Union	3.4	1	3
4	Laurene Collin / John Penticost	Canada	5.6	4	4
5	Kristi Yamaguchi / Rudy Galindo	United States	7.0	5	5
6	Lori Blasko / Todd Sand	United States	8.4	6	6
7	Cheryl Peake / Andrew Naylor	United Kingdom	9.8	7	7

=== Ice dancing ===
CD1: Westminster Waltz
CD2: Yankee Polka
CD3: Rhumba

Rank	Name	Nation	TFP	CD1	CD2	CD3	OSP	FD
1	Isabelle Duchesnay / Paul Duchesnay	France	3.0	2	2	2	2	1
2	Suzanne Semanick / Scott Gregory	United States	3.0	1	1	1	1	2
3	Jo-Anne Borlase / Scott Chalmers	Canada	6.0	3	3	3	3	3
4	Jill Heiser / Michael Verlich	United States	8.6	4	5	4	5	4
5	Jodie Balogh / Jerod Swallow	United States	9.6	5	4	6	4	5
6	Stefania Calegari / Pasquale Camerlengo	Italy	11.8	6	6	5	6	6
7	Elizabeth Coates / Alan Abretti	United Kingdom	14.0	7	7	7	7	7
8	Melanie Cole / Martin Smith	Canada	16.0	8	8	8	8	8
9	Ursula Howlik / Herbert Howlik	Austria	18.0	9	9	9	9	9
