= Lyudmila Koblova =

Russian pair skater

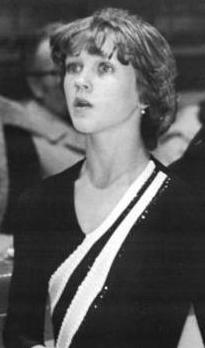
- Lyudmila Koblova in November 1982 at the 1982 Blue Swords

Personal information
- Native name: Людмила Вячеславовна Коблова
- Full name: Lyudmila Vyacheslavovna Koblova
- Other names: Liudmila/Ludmila
- Born: 26 May 1967 (age 59) Gorky, Russian SFSR, Soviet Union

Figure skating career
- Country: Soviet Union
- Partner: Andrei Kalitin
- Coach: Irina Rodnina
- Retired: 1980s

Lyudmila Vyacheslavovna Koblova (Russian: Людмила Вячеславовна Коблова; born 26 May 1967) is a Russian former pair skater who competed for the Soviet Union. With her skating partner, Andrei Kalitin, she won seven international medals, including gold at the 1985 Nebelhorn Trophy and bronze at the 1986 Skate America.

After retiring from competition, Koblova became a skating coach in Russia. She formerly coached Viktoria Borzenkova, Andrei Chuvilaev, Kristina Astakhova, and Nikita Bochkov.

== Competitive highlights ==
With Kalitin

International
Event	82–83	83–84	84–85	85–86	86–87	87–88	88–89
Blue Swords	3rd						
Nebelhorn Trophy				1st			
Prague Skate					3rd		
Prize of Moscow News				7th	3rd	10th	6th
Skate America					3rd		
St. Ivel International	1st						
St. Gervais International				2nd			
