= Cheyenne Mountain School District 12 =

School district in Colorado Springs, Colorado U.S.

Cheyenne Mountain School District 12 (CMSD12)

Address
- 1775 La Clede Street Colorado Springs, Colorado, 80906; United States
- Coordinates: 38°49′19″N 104°50′20″W

District information
- Type: Public
- Motto: A Tradition of Excellence... Reaffirming our Beliefs
- Grades: Pre-K/K–12
- Established: 1872 (154 years ago)
- Superintendent: David Peak
- School board: Five members
- Schools: Pre one, elementary five, middle one, high one
- Budget: $61,322,000 (2024–25)
- NCES District ID: 0802940
- Affiliation: Colorado High School Activities Association

Students and staff
- Enrollment: 3,763 (2024–2025)
- Teachers: 250.53 (on full-time equivalent basis, 2024–2025
- Staff: 250.53 (2024–2025)
- Student–teacher ratio: 15.02 (2024–2025)

Other information
- Website: www.cmsd12.org

The Cheyenne Mountain School District 12 (CMSD12) is a unified, and public school district located in Colorado Springs, Colorado, United States, south of Denver, Colorado. It embodies one pre-school, five elementary schools, one junior high school, and one comprehensive high school.

CMSD12 was formed in 1884. Student enrollment for the 2024–25 school year is 3,737 and it spends an average of $15,113 per pupil and maintains a student-to-teacher ratio of 15:0.2 (which is well above the county average of $10,000 and the state average of $11,317).

The district's high school is a member of the Colorado High School Activities School Activity Association (CHSAA) organization. During 2025, Niche.com ranked Cheyenne Mountain High School the number best school district in the state of Colorado.

== History ==
Before the formation of the district, students were served education in a small shed from 1860 to 1871, and later during 1872 it was served at a rustic, rural, single room schoolhouse twelve foot long cabin overlooking Cheyenne Mountain for adolescents created by settlers of Colorado including Daniel Kinsman, Carter Harlan and Marcus Foster, which would become the high school. During 1872 the first educator named Mary Harlan taught nine pupils, the first school year lasted a combined total of roughly three months.

First School
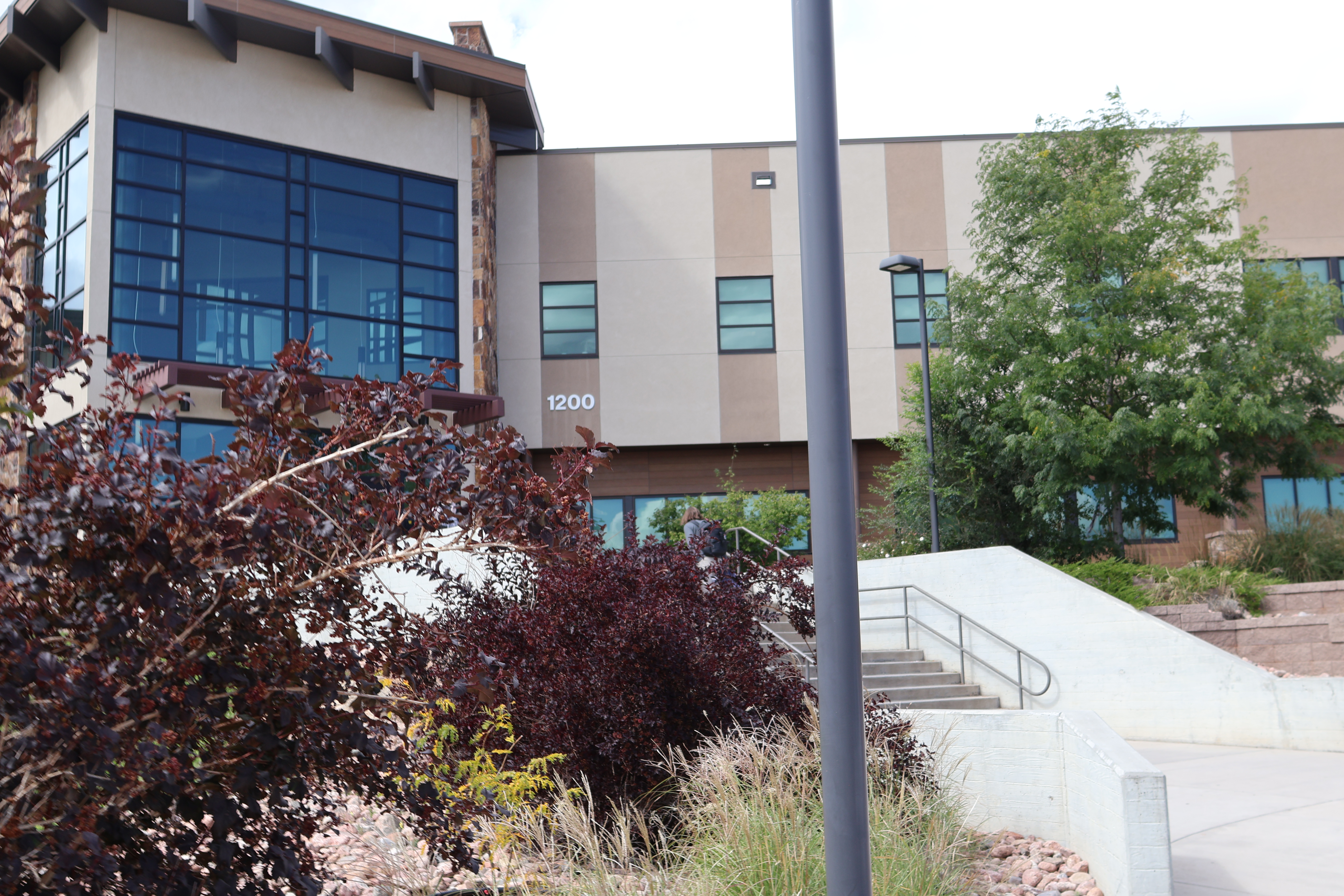
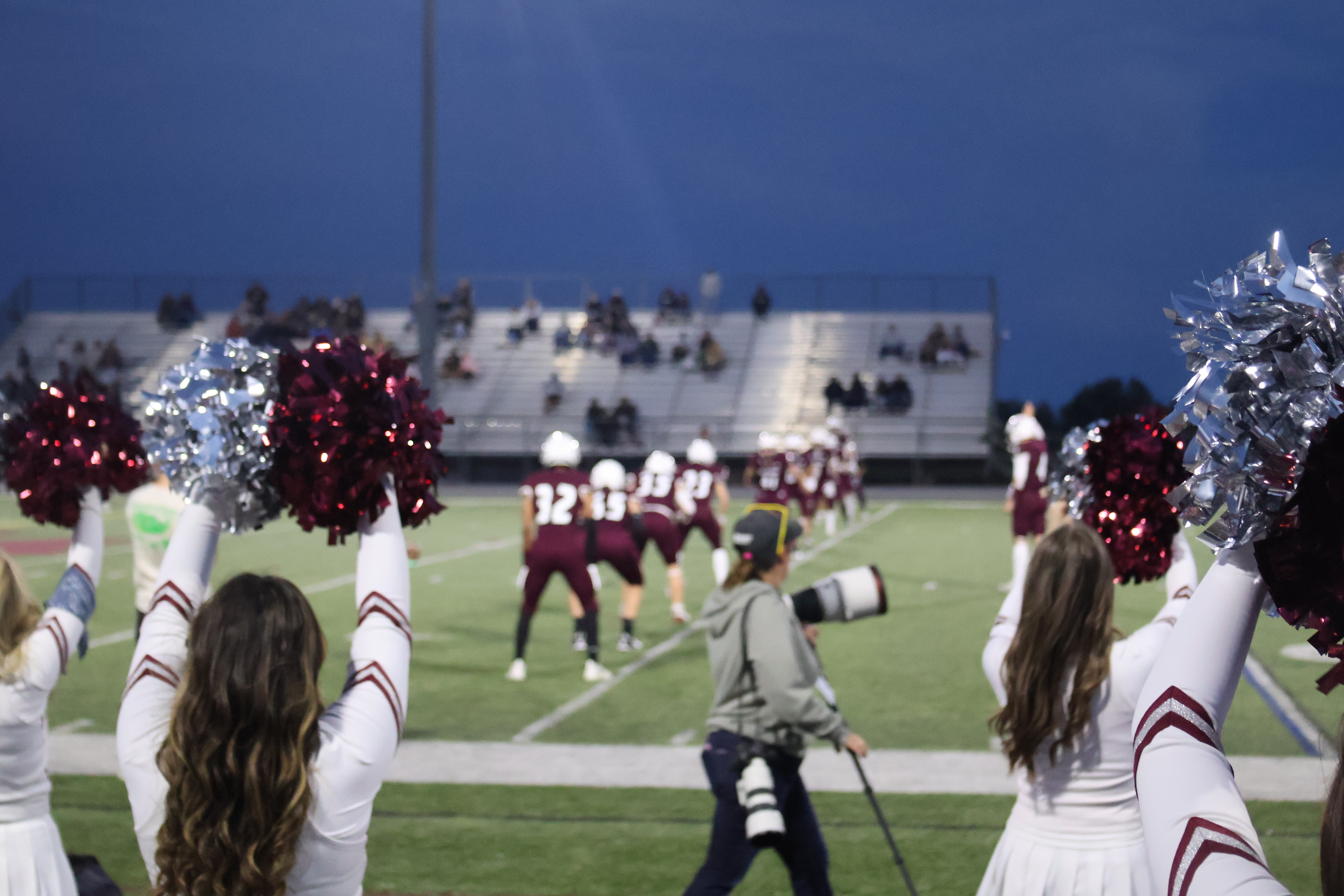
Cheyenne Mountain High School; Cheyenne Mountain Stadium during a game

Growing at a steady pace and fueled by suburbanization, by 1910 the new district was deemed too small to accommodate all of its students, and as a result an additional six rooms on the school campus were designed and in 1959 a gym was added onto the side of the school. And an additional two new elementary schools were approved for construction in 1955. An additional elementary school was created during 1956, known as Broadmoor Elementary and in 1962 the old high school was converted into a $2 million middle school during which the high school, Cheyenne Mountain High School was relocated.

As with other school districts across the United States, Cheyenne Mountain School District took measures to implement distance learning after the onset of the COVID-19 pandemic to prevent the spread of the virus. Initially, students attended school remotely on October 23, 2020. On November 9, 2020, the district would later eventually open the year with a transition to a hybrid in-person and virtual learning model.

== Administration ==
Cheyenne Mountain School District supplies students with Chromebook tablets, which operate on ChromeOS. In addition, the district uses Google Apps for Education for student email and document storage and Infinite Campus Parent Portal for student record-keeping. District 12 is known to use linewize which is a network filter powered by Qoria. CMSD five-member Board of Education governs the district and selects the superintendent. Each member of the Board of education upon being elected by the public is expected to serve a four-year term.

== General information ==
Composition (2024–25)
- White: 71.6%
- Asian/Pacific Islander: 2.9%
- Hispanic/Latino: 15.5%
- Black: 1.9%
- American Indian/Alaska Native: 0.4%
- Multiracial: 0.4%

Source: US News & World Report

Student enrollment for the 2024–25 school year is 3,725 and it spends an average of $15,113 per pupil and maintains a student-to-teacher ratio of 15:0.2 (this is above the county average of $10,000 and the state average of $11,317).

=== Location and area ===
The Cheyenne Mountain School District covers the southwestern land in the city of Colorado Springs. The main administrative facility is located at 1755 La Clede Street in Colorado Springs.

=== Demographics ===
In the 2024–25 school year, the Cheyenne Mountain School District enrolled approximately 3,737 students; of which 269 (7.2 percent) were eligible for free lunch or reduced-price lunch. The student body is 51% male and 49% female and 7.2 percent of students are economically disadvantaged.

Historical enrollment in the Cheyenne Mountain District 12 Public School District (1872–1966)

Year	Enroll.	±% p.a.
1872	9	—
1961	1,785	+6.12%

Year	Enroll.	±% p.a.
1965	1,900	+1.57%
1966	2,110	+11.05%

Year	Enroll.	±% p.a.
2025	3,737	+0.97%
2026	3,800	+1.69%

Year	Enroll.	±% p.a.

Year	Enroll.	±% p.a.

- 1961, 1965, 1966

== Schools ==
=== Cheyenne Mountain High School ===
Cheyenne Mountain High School (called Cheyenne or CMHS) was founded as Cheyenne Mountain District Twelve. Its first class graduated in 1872. The school has been named a National Blue Ribbon School. The mascot is the red tailed hawk. The Cheyenne Mountain High School has 1,268 students 9–12.

Student body

As of the 2024–25 school year, the high schools largest ethnicity were White Americans, followed by Hispanic and Latino Americans and then by Multiracial Americans.

=== Cheyenne Mountain Junior High ===
Cheyenne Mountain Junior High is a feeder school to Cheyenne Mountain High School and is located near the school on W. Cheyenne Road. In addition both schools are known to participate in the gifted and talented program. And during the 2025−25 school year it had an enrollment of 887 students.

=== Cheyenne Mountain Elementary School ===
Cheyenne Mountain Elementary School is an elementary school located in district 12 with an enrolment of 326 students in 2023−24.

=== Cañon School ===
Cañon school is the only preschool in the district and as of the 2023–24 school year had a student population of 326 students.

=== Broadmoor Elementary School ===
Broadmoor Elementary School is a public co-ed comprehensive school in Colorado Springs, Colorado. The student population of Broadmoor Elementary School is 326 and the school serves K-6.

=== Gold Camp Elementary School ===
Gold Camp Elementary School is a public, co-ed comprehensive school in Colorado Springs Colorado located above and behind the Cheyenne Mountain High School on Gold Camp Road. The student population for the 2023–24 educational year was 451.

Piñon Valley Elementary School
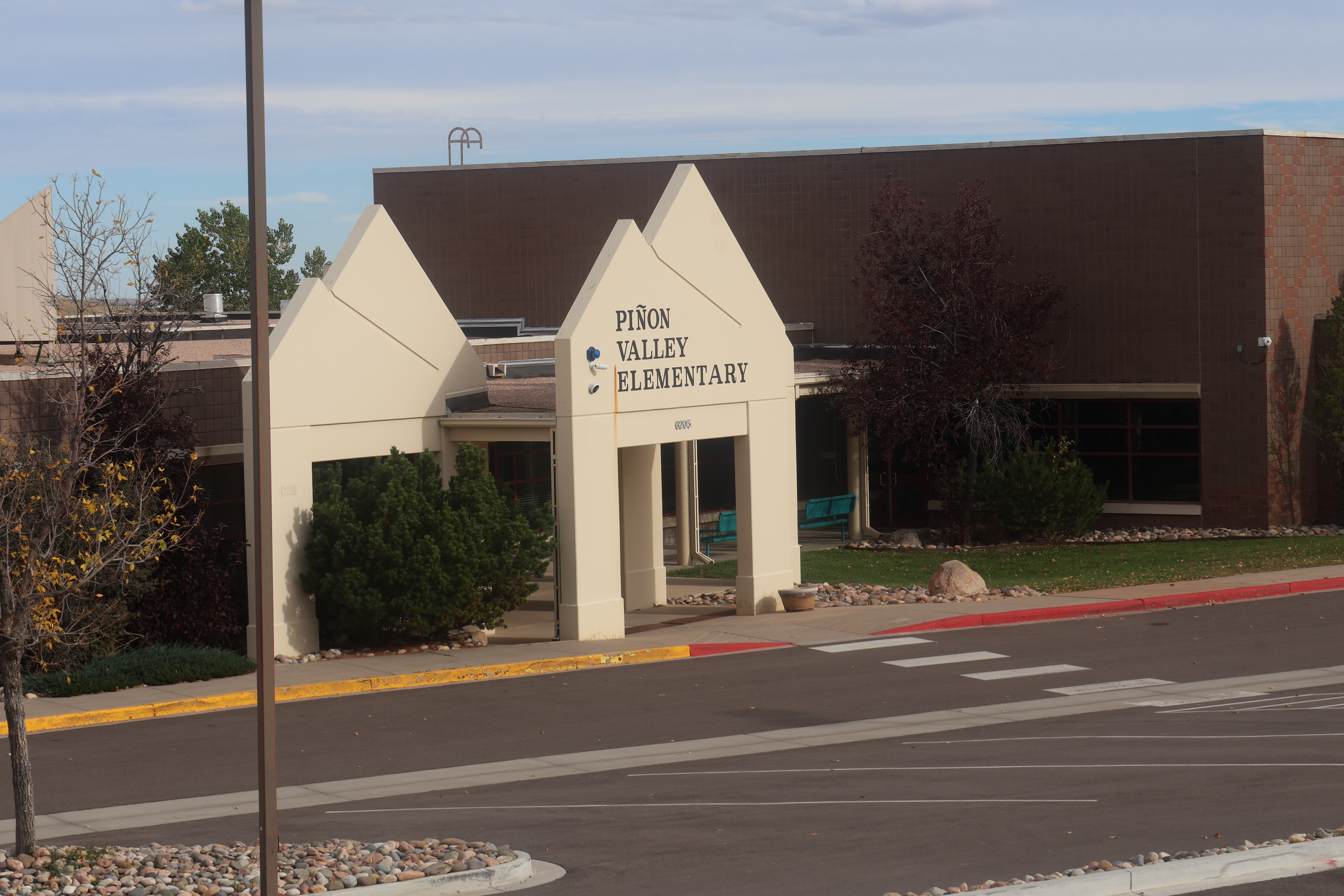
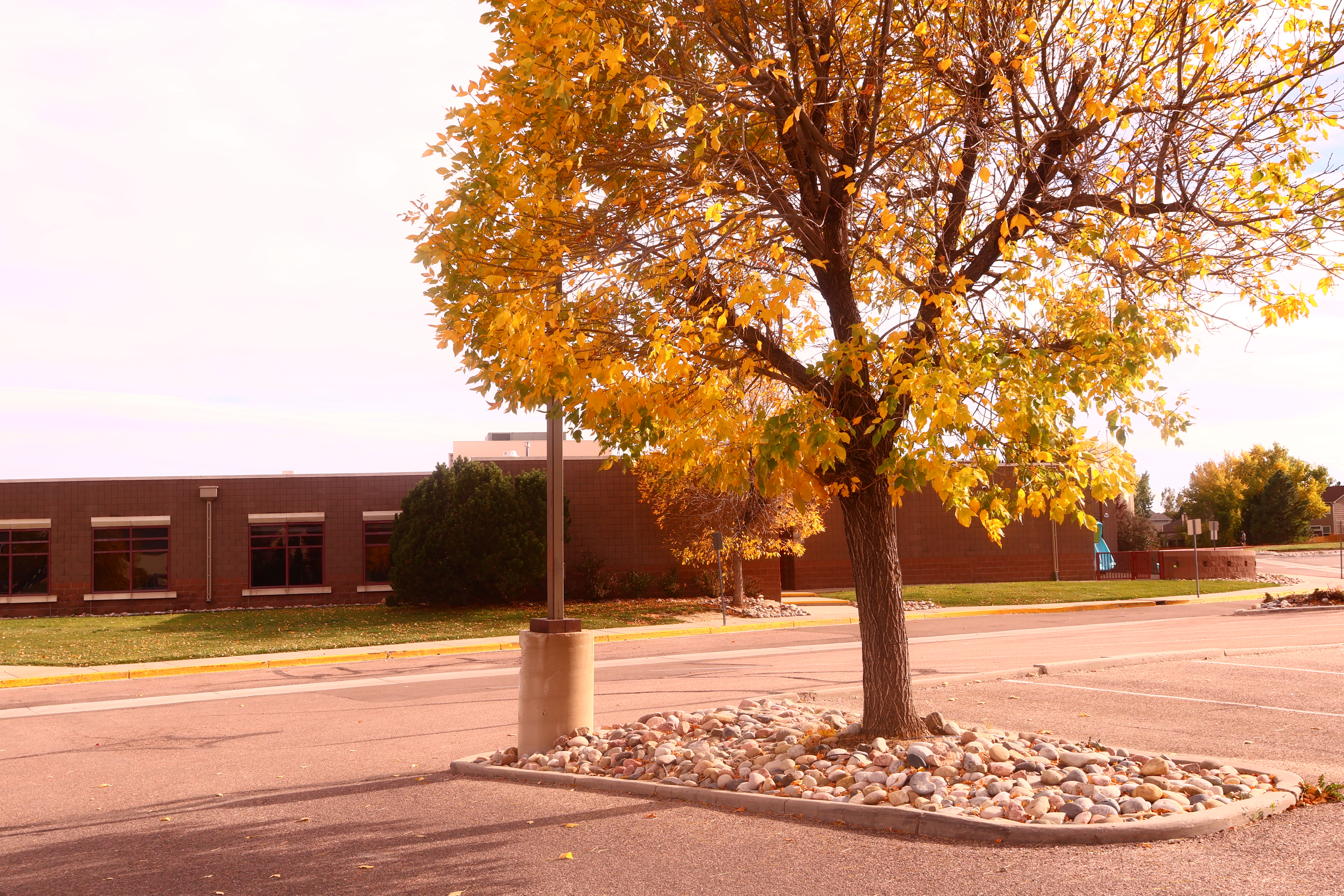

=== Piñon Valley Elementary School ===
Piñon Valley Elementary School serves K–6 and during the 2023–24 had about 327 students. The kindergarten operated on a half day schedule during both 2023 and 2024. In 2025, Niche.com recognized it as the eighth best elementary school in the state of Colorado.

=== Skyway Elementary School ===
Skyway Elementary School serves K–6 and had an enrolment of 305 during the 2023–24 school year.

=== Zebulon Pike Youth Services Center ===
There are seven schools in the Cheyenne Mountain School District. In addition to these schools, the district provides educational services to the Zebulon Pike Youth Services Center.

== Transportation ==
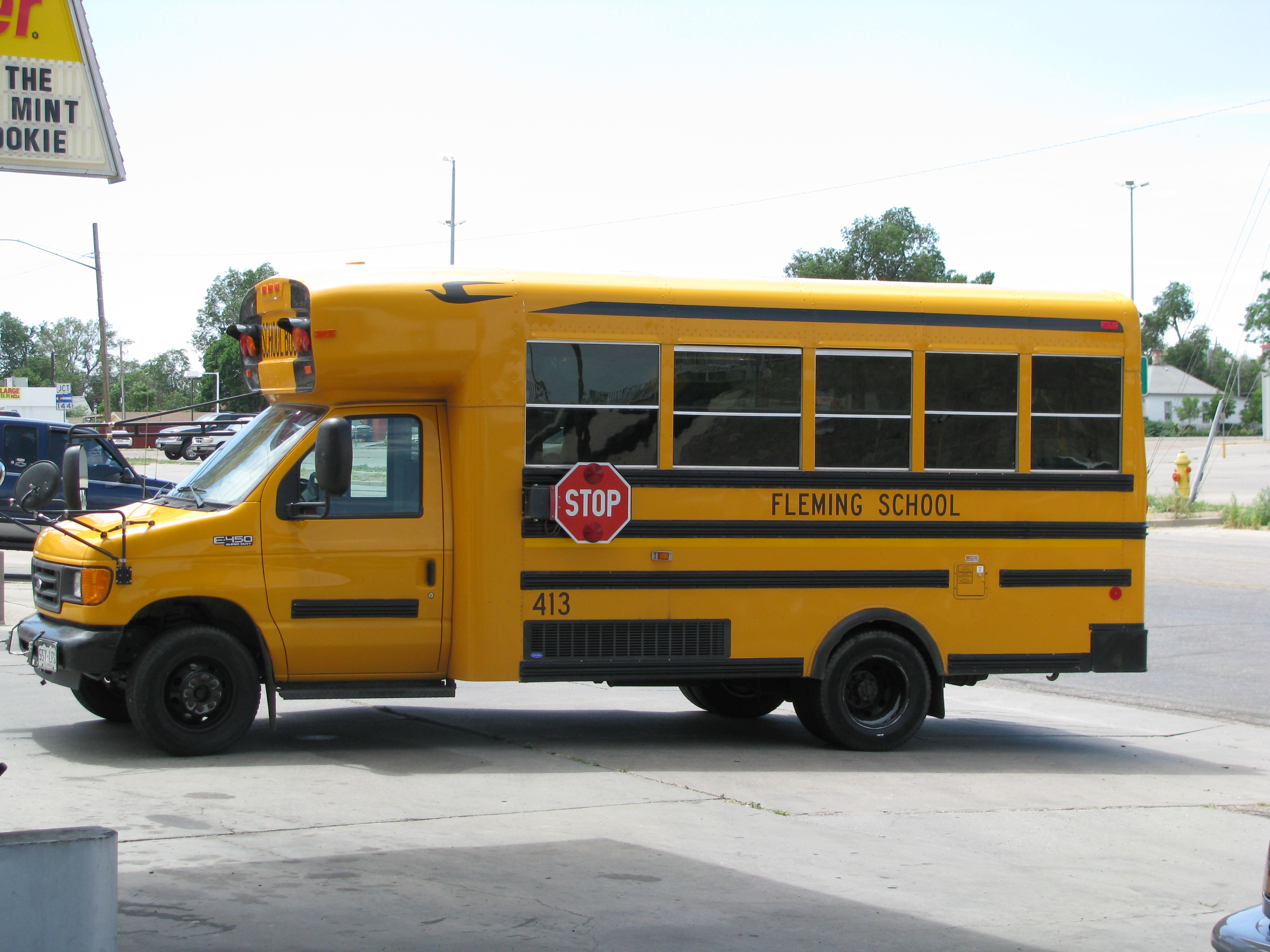
Small bus used for people with accommodations

Cheyenne Mountains School Board invested a vast majority of its budget in its schools and in student oriented programs. As a result of an investment in their schools Cheyenne has fewer resources for support services. As a result, the Cheyenne Mountain School District re-utilizes a bus system for athletic and educational field trips and camping. It does not provide daily student transportation to the school. However, the District, does transport for disabled students as in accordance with federal law and the transport of students who go to the Zebulon Pike's Youth Service Center.

== See also ==
- Cheyenne Mountain High School
- List of school districts in Colorado
