= Katy Keeley =

American pair skater

Personal information
- Full name: Kathryn Keeley
- Born: c. 1966 (age 59–60)
- Height: 4 ft 11 in (150 cm)

Figure skating career
- Country: United States
- Partner: Joseph Mero; Gary Kemp
- Coach: John Nicks
- Retired: 1989

Kathryn "Katy" Keeley (born c. 1966) is an American former pair skater. With her skating partner, Joseph Mero, she won silver at the 1984 St. Ivel International, gold at the 1986 Skate America, bronze at the 1987 Skate Canada International, bronze at the 1987 NHK Trophy, and bronze at the 1988 Grand Prix International de Paris. They are four-time U.S. national medalists, having won bronze in 1987 and 1989, and pewter in 1986 and 1988.

== Personal life ==
The daughter of a naval officer, Keeley was born c. 1966 and was raised with two brothers. During her skating career, she resided in Costa Mesa, California and worked as a foodserver in Newport Beach.

Her son, Ryan, was born around 2004 and her daughter, Megan, two years later. As of August 2014, she was working as a surgical nurse at Hoag Hospital in Newport Beach, California.

== Skating career ==
=== Early career ===
Keeley switched from singles to pairs in 1983, when John Baldwin Sr. asked her to skate with Gary Kemp. The pair won silver medals at two international events in the same year — Nebelhorn Trophy and Grand Prix International St. Gervais. They placed 6th at the 1983 Prague Skate and 7th at the 1984 U.S. Championships. At the end of the season, Kemp left amateur skating for a professional career while Keeley chose to remain an amateur.

=== Partnership with Mero ===
Keeley teamed up with Joseph Mero in 1984. John Nicks served as their coach throughout their career as a pair.

Keeley/Mero's first international medal, a silver, came at the 1984 St. Ivel International in England. They stepped onto a national podium for the first time at the 1986 U.S. Championships, taking the pewter medal for fourth place. The following season, they won gold at the 1986 Skate America and bronze at the 1987 U.S. Championships.

In the 1987–1988 Olympic season, Keeley/Mero won bronze at the 1987 Skate Canada International and 1987 NHK Trophy before placing fourth at the 1988 U.S. Championships. In 1988, Keeley sustained a concussion at an ice show in London.

1988–1989 was Keeley/Mero's fifth season together. Granted free ice time at the Ice Capades Chalet in Costa Mesa, California, the pair was training on-ice daily from 9 a.m. to 1 p.m. They won the bronze medal at the 1988 Grand Prix International de Paris and then received bronze at the 1989 U.S. Championships. After nationals, they decided to retire from competition.

== Competitive highlights ==
=== With Mero ===
International
Event	84–85	85–86	86–87	87–88	88–89
International de Paris					3rd
NHK Trophy				3rd	
Prize of Moscow News			4th		
Skate America			1st		
Skate Canada		4th		3rd	
St. Ivel International	2nd				
National
U.S. Championships	5th	4th	3rd	4th	3rd

=== With Kemp ===
International
Event	1982-83	1983–84
Grand Prix International St. Gervais		2nd
Nebelhorn Trophy		2nd
Prague Skate		6th
National
U.S. Championships	6th	7th
