= Lyndon Johnston =

Canadian pair skater

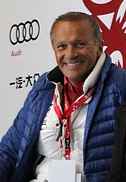
- Johnston in 2016

Personal information
- Born: December 4, 1961 (age 64) Hamiota, Manitoba, Canada
- Height: 1.80 m (5 ft 11 in)

Figure skating career
- Country: Canada
- Partner: Cindy Landry; Denise Benning; Melinda Kunhegyi
- Skating club: Hamiota FSC
- Retired: 1990
Medal record
Representing Canada
Figure skating: Pairs
World Championships
Silver medal – second place	1989 Paris	Pairs

Lyndon Johnston (born December 4, 1961) is a Canadian former pair skater. With Cindy Landry, he is the 1989 World silver medallist and 1990 Canadian national champion.

== Personal life ==
Johnston was born on December 4, 1961, in Hamiota, Manitoba.

== Career ==
Johnston represented Hamiota Figure Skating Club.

=== Partnership with Kunhegyi ===
In 1981, Johnston and his partner, Melinda Kunhegyi, won three international medals – silver at the Nebelhorn Trophy, gold at the Prague Skate, and gold at the Grand Prix International St. Gervais. In 1982, they took silver at the St. Ivel International.

During the 1983–1984 season, the pair won bronze at the 1983 Skate America and then silver at the 1984 Canadian Championships. They placed 12th at the 1984 Winter Olympics in Sarajevo, Yugoslavia.

In their final season together, Kunhegyi/Johnston won silver at the Ennia Challenge Cup and Canadian Championships. They placed fifth at the 1985 World Championships in Tokyo, Japan.

Kunhegyi/Johnston won three national titles in four skating, taking gold in 1982, 1984, and 1985.

=== Partnership with Benning ===
In the 1985–1986 season, Johnston began competing with Denise Benning. The pair won several international medals, including bronze at the 1985 NHK Trophy, bronze at the 1985 Skate Canada International, silver at the 1986 Skate America, and gold at the 1987 St. Ivel International. At the Canadian Championships, they became three-time pair skating medallists (silver in 1986 and 1987, bronze in 1988) and three-time four skating champions (1986–1988).

Benning/Johnston finished fifth at three consecutive World Championships and sixth at the 1988 Winter Olympics in Calgary, Alberta, Canada.

=== Partnership with Landry ===
Later in 1988, Johnston teamed up with Cindy Landry from Quebec. The pair won silver at the 1989 World Championships and gold at the 1990 Canadian Championships. After placing 9th at the 1990 World Championships, they both turned professional.

Johnston was inducted into the Manitoba Sports Hall of Fame and Museum in 1993.

== Results ==
=== Men's singles ===
National
Event	1981–82
Canadian Champ.	1st J

=== Pairs with Kunhegyi ===
International
Event	1981–82	1982–83	1983–84	1984–85
Winter Olympics			12th	
World Champ.				5th
Ennia Cup				2nd
Nebelhorn Trophy	2nd			
Prague Skate	1st			
Skate America			3rd	
St. Gervais	1st			
St. Ivel		2nd		
National
Canadian Champ.			2nd	2nd

=== Pairs with Benning ===
International
Event	1985–86	1986–87	1987–88
Winter Olympics			6th
World Championships	5th	5th	5th
NHK Trophy	3rd		
Skate America		2nd	
Skate Canada	3rd	5th	
St. Ivel International			1st
National
Canadian Championships	2nd	2nd	3rd

=== Pairs with Landry ===
International
Event	1988–89	1989–90
World Championships	2nd	9th
Nebelhorn Trophy	1st	
Skate Canada International		2nd
St. Gervais International	1st	
National
Canadian Championships	2nd	1st
