= Andrei Kalitin =

Pair skater

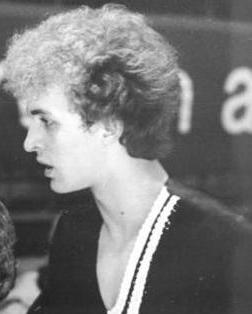
- Andrei Kalitin in November 1982 at the 1982 Blue Swords

Personal information
- Native name: Андрей Калитин
- Born: 1960s

Figure skating career
- Country: Soviet Union
- Partner: Lyudmila Koblova
- Coach: Irina Rodnina
- Retired: 1980s

Andrei Kalitin (Russian: Андрей Калитин) is a former pair skater who competed for the Soviet Union. With his skating partner, Lyudmila Koblova, he won seven international medals, including gold at the 1985 Nebelhorn Trophy and bronze at the 1986 Skate America.

== Competitive highlights ==
With Koblova

International
Event	82–83	83–84	84–85	85–86	86–87	87–88	88–89
Blue Swords	3rd						
Nebelhorn Trophy				1st			
Prague Skate					3rd		
Prize of Moscow News				7th	3rd	10th	6th
Skate America					3rd		
St. Ivel International	1st						
St. Gervais International				2nd			
