= Joseph Mero =

American former pair skater (born 1965)

Personal information
- Born: c. 1965 (age 60–61)
- Height: 6 ft (183 cm)

Figure skating career
- Country: United States
- Partner: Katy Keeley, Tammy Crowson, Maria Lako
- Coach: John Nicks
- Retired: 1994

Joseph Mero (born c. 1965) is an American former pair skater. With his skating partner, Katy Keeley, he won silver at the 1984 St. Ivel International, gold at the 1986 Skate America, bronze at the 1987 Skate Canada International, bronze at the 1987 NHK Trophy, and bronze at the 1988 Grand Prix International de Paris. They are four-time U.S. national medalists, having won bronze in 1987 and 1989, and pewter in 1986 and 1988.

== Personal life ==
Joseph Mero was born c. 1965. His father, Joseph Mero Sr., worked at a paper plant in Detroit, and his mother, Bernie, had emphysema.

== Skating career ==
=== Early career ===
Mero began roller skating as a five-year-old and switched to ice skating six years later. Competing with Maria Lako, he placed 5th in junior pairs at the 1983 U.S. Championships. He and Tammy Crowson won the junior bronze medal at the 1984 U.S. Championships.

=== Partnership with Keeley ===
Mero teamed up with Katy Keeley in 1984. John Nicks served as their coach throughout their career as a pair.

Keeley/Mero's first international medal, a silver, came at the 1984 St. Ivel International in England. They stepped onto a national podium for the first time at the 1986 U.S. Championships, taking the pewter medal for fourth place. The following season, they won gold at the 1986 Skate America and bronze at the 1987 U.S. Championships.

In the 1987–1988 Olympic season, Keeley/Mero won bronze at the 1987 Skate Canada International and 1987 NHK Trophy before placing fourth at the 1988 U.S. Championships. In 1988, Keeley sustained a concussion at an ice show in London.

1988–1989 was Keeley/Mero's fifth season together. Granted free ice time at the Ice Capades Chalet in Costa Mesa, California, the pair was training on-ice daily from 9 a.m. to 1 p.m. They won the bronze medal at the 1988 Grand Prix International de Paris and then received bronze at the 1989 U.S. Championships. After nationals, they decided to retire from competition.

=== Partnership with Urbanski ===
He skated one season with Calla Urbanski in 1993–1994, winning the Eastern Sectionals but placing 7th at the 1994 U.S. Figure Skating Championships.

=== Ban by USFSA ===
He is now banned for life from the USFSA and Professional Skaters Association after a hearing found him guilty of Code of Ethics violations relating to harassment and abuse.

== Competitive highlights ==
=== With Keeley ===
International
Event	84–85	85–86	86–87	87–88	88–89
International de Paris					3rd
NHK Trophy				3rd	
Prize of Moscow News			4th		
Skate America			1st		
Skate Canada		4th		3rd	
St. Ivel International	2nd				
National
U.S. Championships	5th	4th	3rd	4th	3rd

=== With Lako and Crowson ===
National
Event	1982–83 (Lako)	1983–84 (Crowson)
U.S. Championships	5th J	3rd J

=== With Calla Urbanski ===
National
Event	1993–94
U.S. Championships	7th
