= Tiffany Chin =

American figure skater

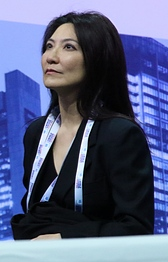

Personal information
- Born: October 3, 1967 (age 59) Oakland, California
- Home town: San Diego, California, U.S.
- Height: 5 ft 3 in (1.60 m)

Figure skating career
- Country: United States
- Retired: 1987
Medal record
Representing the United States
Figure skating: Ladies' singles
World Championships
Bronze medal – third place	1985 Tokyo	Ladies' singles
Bronze medal – third place	1986 Geneva	Ladies' singles
World Junior Championships
Gold medal – first place	1981 London, ON	Ladies' singles

Tiffany Chin
- Traditional Chinese: 陳婷婷
- Simplified Chinese: 陈婷婷
Transcriptions
Standard Mandarin
- Hanyu Pinyin: Chén Tíngtíng
Yue: Cantonese
- Jyutping: Chan4 Ting4 Ting4

Audrey Tiffany Chin (born October 3, 1967) is an American figure skating coach and former competitor. She is a two-time World bronze medalist (1985–1986), a two-time Skate America champion (1983, 1986), and the 1985 U.S. national champion.

== Personal life ==
Chin was born on October 3, 1967, in Oakland, California. She grew up in San Diego, California. She graduated with a BA in English from University of California, Los Angeles. Her son was born in February 2004.

== Career ==
=== Early career ===
Chin won the 1981 World Junior Championships, held in December 1980 in London, Ontario, Canada, after finishing in eighth place in compulsory figures and in second place in both the short program and the free skate. According to figure skating historian James R. Hines, Chin "won the event because of inconsistencies among her competitors". In 1982, she came in fifth place at the U.S. Nationals.

Originally trained by Mabel Fairbanks as a young child, Chin switched to Janet Champion under the recommendation of Fairbanks. Her mother, Marjorie, later fired Champion and had her daughter train with Frank Carroll, who led Chin to her World Junior title. However, Marjorie had some serious disagreements with Carroll which led Carroll to resign. Chin was one of Carroll's first students. Chin then worked with John Nicks.

=== 1983–1984 season ===
At the 1984 U.S. Championships, she placed fourth in the compulsory figures but won both the short and long programs. Finishing second to Rosalynn Sumners, she was awarded the silver medal and was named in the U.S. team to the 1984 Winter Olympic in Sarajevo. At the Olympics, Chin placed 12th in the compulsory figures but climbed to fourth overall after placing second in the short program and third in the free skate. She missed the World Championships due to injury.

=== 1984–1985 season ===
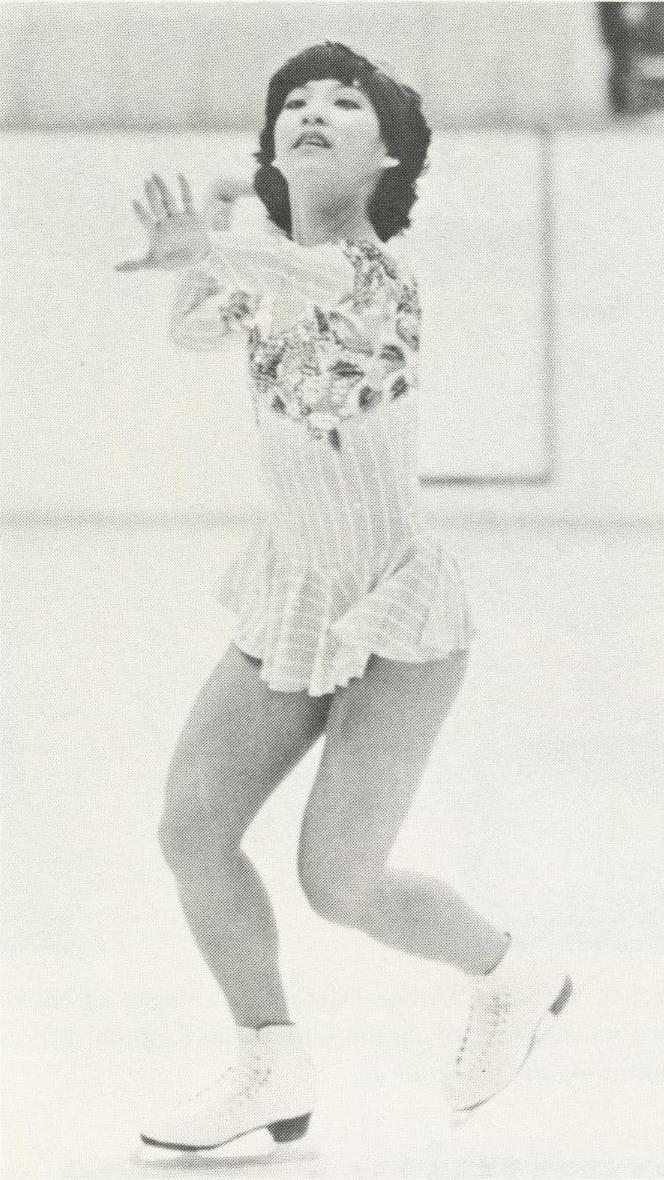
Chin circa 1984

Chin began the next Olympic quadrennium with silver at the 1984 Skate Canada International, where she finished second to Japan's Midori Ito. Chin experienced a decline in consistency and technical level from the previous season; she relied almost exclusively on the triple toe and did not even attempt a triple flip or land a successful triple salchow all season. She won the gold medal at the 1985 U.S. Championships. Despite a fall in the short program and a conservative long program, she finished first in all three phases of the competition at Her U.S. national title was the first singles' title for an Asian-American or anyone of non-European descent.

At the 1985 World Championships, Chin was in a strong position to contend for the title after placing second in both the compulsory figures and the short program. However, in her free skate, she popped her triple Salchow into a single and fell on her final double axel, finishing third in the free program and third overall behind Katarina Witt and Kira Ivanova. As had been the case all season, the toe loop was the only triple she executed successfully. In the summer of 1985, her mother, Marjorie, pulled her off the ice for three months due to her muscle imbalance.

After a growth spurt and a recurring injury (a muscle imbalance affecting her legs, arms, and hips) that caused her to lose many of her triple jumps, Chin left Nicks in 1985 and went on to train with Don Laws.

=== 1985–1986 season ===
After undergoing a course of traditional medicine and chiropractic treatments, Chin began to relearn her skating technique under a new coach, Don Laws. She entered the 1986 U.S. Championships as an underdog and finished third overall behind Debi Thomas and Caryn Kadavy. Chin qualified for the World Championships in Geneva, where she placed fourth in the compulsories and tied for second in the short program to enter the long program in third place. With Witt defeating Thomas in the long program, Chin as the last skater was in position to win the gold by winning the free skate, or to aid Witt in passing Thomas for the gold should she have split them in the long program. A fourth-place finish in the long program (behind Witt, Thomas, and Elizabeth Manley) with one clean triple jump, one other triple with a slight touch down, several double axels, and good presentation scores, was enough to give her the bronze medal overall behind Thomas and Witt.

=== 1986–1987 season ===
In the fall of 1986, Chin returned to Nicks as her coach. She switched again to Carroll prior to the 1987 U.S. Championships. At that event she was in third place after the compulsory figures and short program, but was unable to complete a triple jump or clean double axel in her long program and dropped to fourth overall, failing to qualify for the World Championships for the first time since her U.S. senior national debut in 1982. Needing only a 4th-place finish in the long program after Kadavy's poor short program, Chin's long program was narrowly beaten by a young Tonya Harding, dropping Chin behind Kadavy and off the world team.

Sensing only slim chances of making the Olympic team against the trifecta of Thomas, Kadavy, and Trenary, Chin retired from Olympic-eligible skating in the fall of 1987. According to figure skating historian James R. Hines, Chin suffered with injuries throughout her career, which might have affected her decision to retire.

=== Professional and coaching career ===
Chin toured professionally and competed occasionally in professional events, finishing fourth at the 1987 Nutrasweet World Professional Figure Skating Championships and second at the 1990 U.S. Open behind Elizabeth Manley.

Chin remained involved in figure skating by becoming a coach. Her former students include Beatrisa Liang and Hounsh Munshi. Liang left Chin in 2004 when Chin took some time off from coaching because she was expecting a child. Chin became a technical specialist in 2006, receiving national status a year later.

On May 3, 2009, Chin was honored by the Los Angeles Chinese Historical Society of Southern California in "Celebrating Chinese Americans in Sports".

In 2010, Chin became the coach of Australia's Kailani Craine, who would qualify a spot at the 2018 Winter Olympics and 2022 Winter Olympics.

== Later years ==
Chin was inducted into the United States Figure Skating Hall of Fame in January, 2022.

== Competitive highlights ==
International
Event	80–81	81–82	82–83	83–84	84–85	85–86	86–87
Winter Olympics				4th			
World Champ.			9th		3rd	3rd	
Skate America				1st			1st
Skate Canada					2nd		
NHK Trophy			3rd				
International: Junior
World Junior Champ.	1st						
National
U.S. Championships		5th	3rd	2nd	1st	3rd	4th
