= Melinda Kunhegyi =

Canadian former competitive pair skater (born 1965)

Personal information
- Born: December 1, 1965 (age 60) Guelph, Ontario, Canada
- Height: 1.65 m (5 ft 5 in)

Figure skating career
- Country: Canada
- Partner: Lyndon Johnston
- Skating club: Preston FSC, Cambridge
- Retired: c. 1985

Melinda Kunhegyi (born December 1, 1965) is a Canadian former competitive pair skater. With her skating partner, Lyndon Johnston, she is the 1981 Prague Skate champion, the 1981 Grand Prix International St. Gervais champion, and a two-time Canadian national silver medalist. They competed together at the 1984 Winter Olympics.

== Personal life ==
Kunhegyi was born on December 1, 1965, in Guelph, Ontario, Canada.

== Career ==
Kunhegyi represented the Preston Figure Skating Club in Cambridge, Ontario.

In 1981, Kunhegyi and Lyndon Johnston won three international medals – silver at the Nebelhorn Trophy, gold at the Prague Skate, and gold at the Grand Prix International St. Gervais. In 1982, they took silver at the St. Ivel International.

During the 1983–1984 season, the pair won bronze at the 1983 Skate America and then silver at the 1984 Canadian Championships. They placed 12th at the 1984 Winter Olympics in Sarajevo, Yugoslavia.

In their final season together, Kunhegyi/Johnston won silver at the Ennia Challenge Cup and Canadian Championships. They placed fifth at the 1985 World Championships in Tokyo, Japan.

Kunhegyi/Johnston won three national titles in four skating, taking gold in 1982, 1984, and 1985.

== Results ==
pairs with Johnston

International
Event	1981–82	1982–83	1983–84	1984–85
Winter Olympics			12th	
World Champ.				5th
Ennia Cup				2nd
Nebelhorn Trophy	2nd			
Prague Skate	1st			
Skate America			3rd	
St. Gervais	1st			
St. Ivel		2nd		
National
Canadian Champ.			2nd	2nd
Canadian Junior Champ.	4th		3rd	
