= John T. Irwin =

American academic (1940–2019)

- John T. Irwin in his home
- Born: April 24, 1940; Houston, Texas
- Died: December 20, 2019 (age 79)
- Awards: Christian Gauss Prize (1994)

Academic work
- Institutions: Johns Hopkins University
- Notable works: Doubling and Incest/Repetition and Revenge: A Speculative Reading of Faulkner (1975) Mystery to a Solution: Poe, Borges. and the Analytical Detective Story (1994)

John Thomas Irwin (April 24, 1940 – December 20, 2019) was an American poet and literary critic. He was the Decker Professor in the Humanities and Professor in The Writing Seminars and the English Department at Johns Hopkins University.

== Background ==
Irwin was born in Houston, Texas, and received his bachelor's degree in English at the University of St. Thomas in Houston. Following a stint in the US Navy, he received his Master's degree and PhD in English from Rice University. He began his teaching career as an assistant professor in the English department at Johns Hopkins University in 1970 but left Johns Hopkins in 1974 to become the editor of The Georgia Review at the University of Georgia. Dr. Irwin returned to Johns Hopkins to become professor and chair of The Writing Seminars department. After that, he accepted a joint appointment in the English department and in 1984 received an endowed chair, the Decker Professorship in the Humanities.

== Publications ==
Irwin's first book of literary criticism, Doubling and Incest/Repetition and Revenge: A Speculative Reading of Faulkner, was published by Johns Hopkins University Press in 1975.

His second book of literary criticism, American Hieroglyphics: The Symbol of the Egyptian Hieroglyphics in the American Renaissance, was published by Yale University Press in 1980.

His third book of literary criticism, Mystery to a Solution: Poe, Borges. and the Analytical Detective Story, was published by Johns Hopkins University Press in 1994. It won the Christian Gauss Prize from Phi Beta Kappa for the best scholarly book in the humanities published in 1994 and also won the Aldo Scaglione Prize in comparative literature from the Modern Language Association for the best scholarly book published in the field of comparative literature the same year.

His fourth book of literary criticism, Unless the Threat of Death Is Behind Them: Hard-Boiled Fiction and Film Noir, was published by Johns Hopkins University Press in 2006.

His fifth book of literary criticism, Hart Crane's Poetry: Appollinaire Lived in Paris, I Live in Cleveland, Ohio, was published by Johns Hopkins University Press in 2011.

His sixth book of literary criticism, F. Scott Fitzgerald's Fiction: An Almost Theatrical Innocence, was published by Johns Hopkins University Press in 2014.

Irwin wrote four books of poetry under the pen name John Bricuth: The Heisenberg Variations (University of Georgia Press, 1976), Just Let Me Say This About That: A Narrative Poem (Overlook Press, 2003), As Long As It's Big: A Narrative Poem (Johns Hopkins University Press, 2005), and Pure Products of America, Inc.: A Narrative Poem (Johns Hopkins University Press, 2015).

== Chess ==
Irwin was a noted chess aficionado, with a "prodigious memory for chess." Named in his honor, the John T. Irwin National Tournament of Senior State Champions is a national championship run annually by US Chess in conjunction with the U.S. Open.

== Partial bibliography ==
Academic

- Doubling and Incest/Repetition and Revenge: A Speculative Reading of Faulkner (Baltimore, MD: Johns Hopkins University Press, 1975).
- American Hieroglyphics: The Symbol of the Egyptian Hieroglyphics in the American Renaissance (New Haven, CT: Yale University Press, 1980).
- The Mystery to a Solution: Poe, Borges, and the Analytical Detective Story (Baltimore, MD: Johns Hopkins University Press, 1994).
- Unless the Threat of Death Is Behind Them: Hard-Boiled Fiction and Film Noir (Baltimore, MD: Johns Hopkins University Press, 2006).
- Hart Crane's Poetry: Appollinaire Lived in Paris, I Live in Cleveland, Ohio (Baltimore, MD: Johns Hopkins University Press, 2011).
- F. Scott Fitzgerald's Fiction: An Almost Theatrical Innocence (Baltimore, MD: Johns Hopkins University Press, 2014).

Reviews

- T. Irwin, John T., "The Crisis of Regular Forms" [Review of On the Edge of the Knife by Charles Edward Eaton; Birth and Copulation and Death by Harry Morris; Coat on a Stick by Rolfe Humphries; The Geography of Lograire by Thomas Merton; New and Selected Poems by David Wagoner; The World Before Us: Poems 1950-70 by Theodore Weiss], The Sewanee Review, Vol. 81, No. 1 (Winter, 1973), pp. 158–171.

Poetry

- Irwin, John T. (as John Bricuth), The Heisenberg Variations (Georgia: University of Georgia Press, 1976).
- Irwin, John T. (as John Bricuth), Just Let Me Say This About That, Sewanee Writers' Series (New York: Overlook Press, 1998).
- Irwin, John T. (Ed.), Words Brushed by Music: Twenty-Five Years of the Johns Hopkins Poetry Series (Johns Hopkins: Poetry and Fiction, Foreword by Anthony Hecht (Baltimore, MD: Johns Hopkins University Press, 2004).
- Irwin, John T. (as John Bricuth), As Long As It's Big: A Narrative Poem (Baltimore, MD: Johns Hopkins University Press, 2005).
- Irwin, John T. (as John Bricuth), Pure Products of America, Inc.: A Narrative Poem (Baltimore, MD: Johns Hopkins University Press, 2015).
