= Caryn Kadavy =

American figure skater

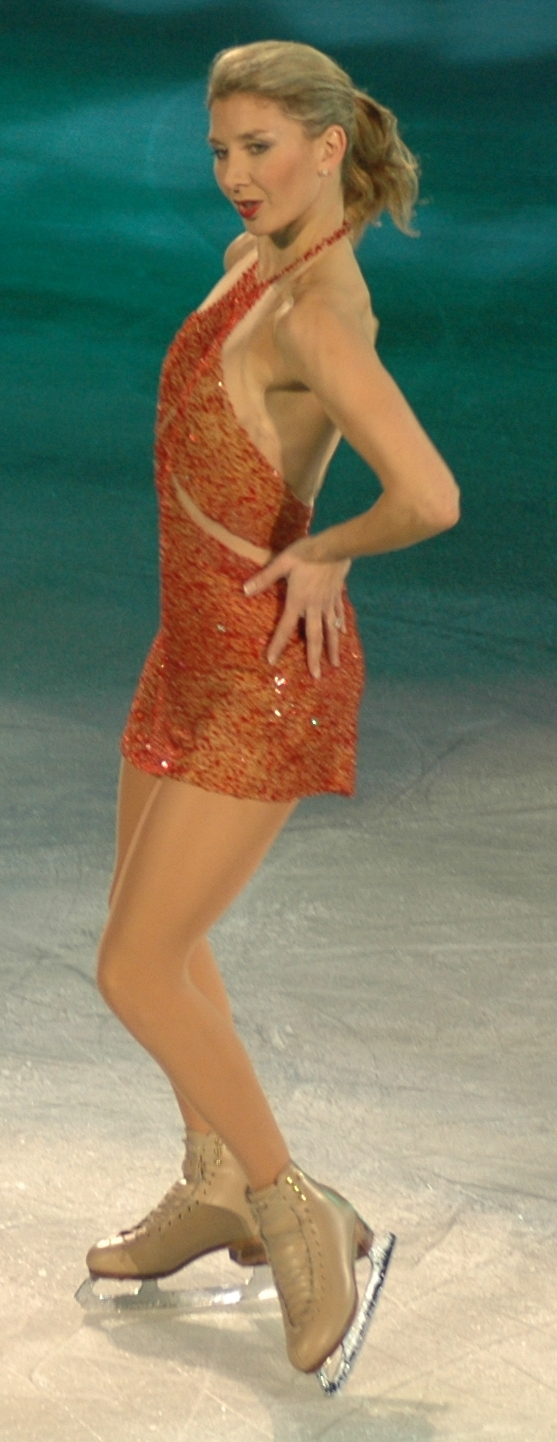
- Kadavy performing in 2006

Personal information
- Born: December 9, 1967 (age 58) Erie, Pennsylvania, U.S.
- Height: 5 ft 4 in (1.62 m)

Figure skating career
- Country: United States
- Retired: 1989
Medal record
Ladies' Figure skating
Representing the United States
World Championships
Bronze medal – third place	1987 Cincinnati	Ladies' singles

Caryn Kadavy (born December 9, 1967) is an American professional figure skater and former competitor. She is the 1987 World bronze medalist and a four-time U.S. national medalist. She also competed at the 1988 Winter Olympics.

== Career ==
Kadavy was born in Erie, Pennsylvania. As an amateur, she won medals at the U.S. Championships four years in a row, including silver in 1986. She won several competitions in 1985: the U.S. Olympic Festival, Skate Canada International, and the Moscow News Cup. She was a top-ten finisher at the World Figure Skating Championships three times, including a bronze medal in 1987.

Kadavy's initial breakthrough was a bronze medal at the 1985 U.S. Figure Skating Championships, where she placed 2nd behind overall winner Tiffany Chin, but ahead of Debi Thomas in the long program. Due to poor figures and a fall in the short program, she settled for bronze, and due to only 2 spots being allotted to U.S. women for that years Worlds due to Elaine Zayak's retirement (at the time the rules were that at least one skater who earned the number of spots for a country had to fill one of those spots to maintain that number), narrowly missed the World Team. In 1986 she came into Nationals having won 2 international competitions already, and after winning the short program over both Debi Thomas and Tiffany Chin, seemed to be in strong position to win her first National title. However following Thomas's brilliant 5 triple free skate, a nervous Kadavy made a couple of major mistakes, and lost the title by a 6–3 split, winning silver and qualifying for her first Worlds. There she placed a disappointing 8th, with mistakes in all 3 phases. This was the beginning of her reputation as a nervy and inconsistent competitor.

At the 1987 Nationals she again went in as a strong threat for the title, especially with defending Champion Debi Thomas injured and in subpar condition (Thomas would in fact lose the title to a young upstart, Kadavy's training partner Jill Trenary). After placing 3rd in the compulsory figures, Kadavy skated a disastrous short program featuring a major adel fall, and where she placed only 9th. With a respectable free skating performance, Kadavy was able to narrowly climb back up to 3rd and make the team due to Tiffany Chin's own disastrous long program performance where she failed to land even a double axel cleanly. At Worlds she delivered her best competition to date, skating strongly in all 3 phases - compulsory figures, short program, and long program - to win the bronze. She narrowly lost silver to Debi Thomas by a 6-3 verdict in the long program, and might have won silver or even gold but for popping both a triple toe and double axel in the dying stages of her program. This silenced many of her critics, and set her up as a potential major contender for the podium at the 1988 Calgary Olympics.

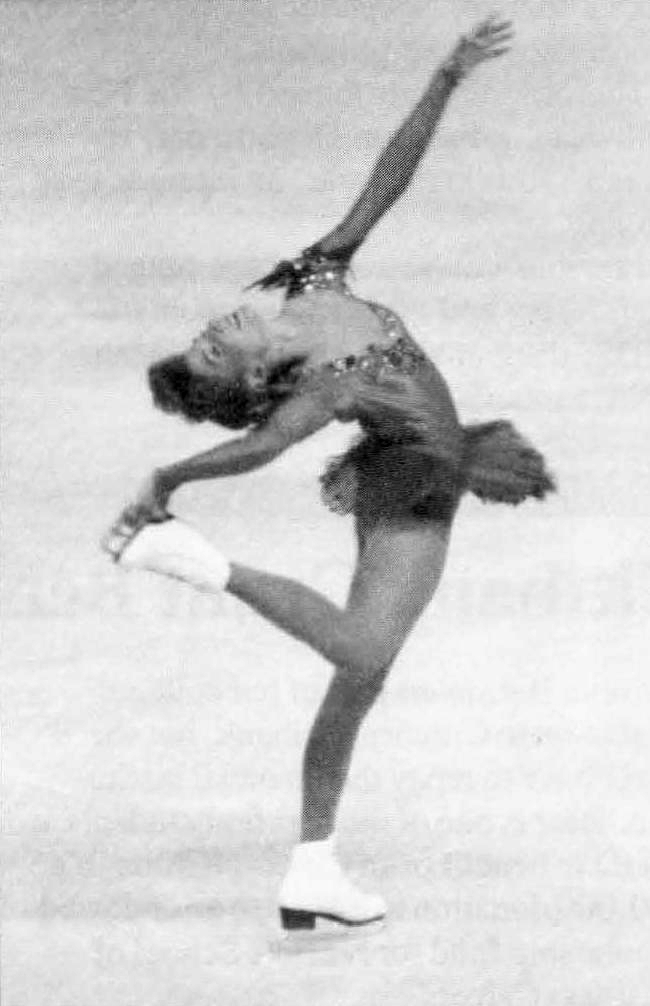
Kadavy circa 1988

At the 1988 Winter Olympics, she was in 6th place after the short program but withdrew prior to the free skate due to the flu. During this period, Kadavy was coached by Carlo Fassi at the Broadmoor Skating Club; she also worked with Toller Cranston prior to the 1987–88 season. In December 1988, she underwent an operation to remove a cyst on an ovary. She withdrew from the 1989 U.S. Championships due to a stress fracture in one ankle and a pinched nerve in the other.

Kadavy went on to skate regularly in professional ice shows throughout the 1990s and early 2000s, and is still active as of 2010. She has won numerous professional championships, including Miko Masters (1993), Hershey's Kisses (1993 and 1994), U.S. Open (1993), Canadian Pro (1996), and Ladies Pro Final (1997), as well as numerous team competitions. She is currently a skating teacher in Minneapolis, Minnesota. As a professional she was heavily praised by Scott Hamilton, Dick Button, Peggy Fleming, amongst others, as showing the complete package of ladies skating, combining strong technical ability for a pro (capable of a triple loop, triple toe, triple salchow, and double axel), strong spins, speed, and wonderful artistry, along with a wider variety of artistic choices and programs than she had displayed as an amateur where she had been known mostly just for a balletic skating style. It was noted by many how she had gained the confidence and consistency as a professional competitor, which had held her back as an amateur.

== Competitive highlights ==
International
Event	1984–1985	1985–1986	1986–1987	1987–1988
Winter Olympic Games				WD
World Championships		8th	3rd	7th
Golden Spin of Zagreb				1st
Skate Canada International		1st		
Prize of Moscow News		1st		
St. Ivel International				1st
National
U.S. Championships	3rd	2nd	3rd	3rd
