= Jill Trenary =

American figure skater

Personal information
- Born: Jill Ann Trenary; August 1, 1968 (age 57) Minnetonka, Minnesota, U.S.
- Height: 5 ft 4 in (1.62 m)
- Spouse: Christopher Dean (m. 1994; div. 2010)

Figure skating career
- Country: United States
- Retired: 1997
Medal record
Ladies' figure skating
Representing the United States
World Championships
Gold medal – first place	1990 Halifax	Ladies' singles
Bronze medal – third place	1989 Paris	Ladies' singles

Jill Ann Trenary (born August 1, 1968) is an American former figure skater. She is the 1990 World champion and a three-time U.S. national champion. She was inducted to the United States Figure Skating Hall of Fame in 2002.

== Career ==
Originally from Minnetonka, Minnesota, at the age of 16, she relocated to Colorado Springs, Colorado to train with noted coach Carlo Fassi. Trenary won the U.S. junior title in 1985. During a warm-up in 1985, she collided with another skater, whose blade sliced Trenary's calf muscles and severed an artery in her left leg.

Trenary placed 5th in her first senior national championships in 1986. Later that summer she won the U.S. Olympic Festival. In fall 1986 she placed second to Elizabeth Manley at the St. Ivel International. At the U.S. championships in 1987, she finished second in both the compulsory figures and short program, where she landed a triple flip jump for the first time in her combination. In the long program Trenary landed four clean triple jumps, including the triple flip, and she upset reigning world champion Debi Thomas to take her first senior national title. At the 1987 World Championships, she rallied from 11th in the compulsory figures to place fourth in the short program, again landing the triple flip jump in combination, and fifth in the long program, to place 7th overall. In 1988, Thomas regained the U.S. title, with Trenary finishing second. Trenary placed 4th at the 1988 Winter Olympics. She was 5th at the 1988 World Championships, where she fell on the triple flip in both her short and long programs. Due to her strength in compulsory figures, Trenary again won the U.S. Championships in 1989, although she was defeated by Kristi Yamaguchi in the free skating. Trenary won bronze at the 1989 World Championships.. In 1989 in the Skate America she made a number of mistakes in both the long and the short programme and came second to Tonya Harding.

In 1990, Trenary won both the U.S. and World titles. Her strength in the compulsory figures was the deciding factor at the 1990 World Championships. She was 5th in the short program and second in the free skate to Midori Ito but her top placement in the figures kept her in the lead overall. The International Skating Union eliminated figures after that season. After she won her World title, her coach, Carlo Fassi, returned to live in his home country, Italy, and Trenary began working with Kathy Casey.

Trenary's triple jumps included the toe loop, salchow, and flip, which was quite competitive for a female singles skater in the mid-to-late 1980s. One of her signature moves was a combination of a one-foot Axel into a triple salchow.

In January 1991, Trenary underwent surgery to drain her ankle after she developed a staph infection. As a result, she withdrew from the 1991 U.S. Championships. In March 1991, Trenary moved to Cleveland, Ohio, to work with Carol Heiss Jenkins.

With the elimination of compulsory figures—formerly Trenary's strength—from competition, the technical standard for jumping in women's skating had risen greatly, with the top skaters all attempting five or six different triples. Trenary's injury was slow to heal and she had problems regaining her former standard of jumps, much less learning new ones. She planned to compete at the 1992 U.S. Championships, beginning her comeback in fall 1991 at Skate Canada, where she finished second in the short program to Surya Bonaly, but dropped to fourth overall after the long program, where she was unable to successfully land any triple jumps. She qualified for the 1992 U.S. Nationals by winning the 1991 Midwestern Sectional Championships with an uneven performance: after a strong short program in which she landed a triple flip combination, she was unable to land any triple jumps in the long program. She ended her bid to qualify for the 1992 Winter Olympics in December 1991.

After turning professional, Trenary toured with the Tom Collins Tour of Champions and Stars on Ice for several years. Prior to the 1993 World Championships, the eventual winner and soon-to-be Olympic champion, Oksana Baiul, cited Trenary as her favorite skater for her beauty and style. Although Trenary's early professional competitive career was uneven, in 1996 she skated particularly strong programs, choreographed by her then-husband, Christopher Dean, to George Winston's "Variations on a Theme by Pachelbel", and to Nancy Sinatra's "These Boots Are Made for Walkin'" as part of the U.S. team in its victory over the world team in Ice Wars.

Trenary retired from skating in 1997 after developing a life-threatening blood clot in her shoulder.

== Personal life ==
Trenary married British ice dancer Christopher Dean on October 15, 1994. They have two sons, Jack Robert and Sam Colin. Dean's agent confirmed in March 2010 the couple had separated.

== Competitive highlights ==
International
Event	83–84	84–85	85–86	86–87	87–88	88–89	89–90	90–91	91–92
Winter Olympics					4th				
World Champ.				7th	5th	3rd	1st		
Goodwill Games								2nd	
Skate America							2nd		
Skate Canada						2nd			4th
Fujifilm Trophy					2nd				
Int. de Paris					1st				
Moscow News				2nd					
St. Ivel				2nd					
National
U.S. Champ.	4th J	1st J	5th	1st	2nd	1st	1st		
J = Junior level
