= 1931 U.S. Figure Skating Championships =

Figure skating competition

- Type: National Championship
- Date: March 20 – 21
- Season: 1930–31
- Location: Boston, Massachusetts
- Host: Skating Club of Boston
- Venue: Boston Arena

Champions
- Men's singles: Roger F. Turner (Senior) & Joseph K. Savage (Junior)
- Women's singles: Maribel Vinson (Senior) & Margaret Bennett (Junior)
- Pairs: Beatrix Loughran and Sherwin C. Badger (Senior) & Nancy Follett and F. Ashton Parmenter (Junior)
- Ice dance: Theresa Weld Blanchard and Nathaniel W. Niles
- Previous: 1930 U.S. Championships
- Next: 1932 U.S. Championships

The 1931 U.S. Figure Skating Championships were held from March 20–21 at the Boston Arena in Boston, Massachusetts. Gold, silver, and bronze medals were awarded in men's singles and women's singles at the senior, junior, and novice levels, pair skating at the senior and junior levels, and ice dance at the senior level.

== Senior results ==
=== Men's singles ===
Men's results
Rank	Skater
1st place, gold medalist(s)	Roger F. Turner
2nd place, silver medalist(s)	J. Lester Madden
3rd place, bronze medalist(s)	George E. B. Hill
4	Gail Borden II
5	William J. Nagle

=== Women's singles ===
Women's results
Rank	Skater
1st place, gold medalist(s)	Maribel Y. Vinson
2nd place, silver medalist(s)	Edith Secord
3rd place, bronze medalist(s)	Hulda Berger
4	Virginia Badger

=== Pairs ===
Pairs' results
Rank	Team
1st place, gold medalist(s)	Beatrix Loughran; Sherwin C. Badger
2nd place, silver medalist(s)	Maribel Y. Vinson; George E. B. Hill
3rd place, bronze medalist(s)	Grace E. Madden; J. Lester Madden
4	Theresa Weld Blanchard; Nathaniel W. Niles

=== Ice dance ===
Ice dance results
Rank	Team
1st place, gold medalist(s)	Theresa Weld Blanchard; Nathaniel William Niles

== Junior results ==
=== Men's singles ===
Men's results
Rank	Skater
1st place, gold medalist(s)	Joseph K. Savage
2nd place, silver medalist(s)	Lyman E. Wakefield Jr.
3rd place, bronze medalist(s)	Robin Lee
4	George Boltres
5	Bruce Mapes
6	R. G. Janson
7	H. R. Robertson
8	A. E. Janson
9	E. Brigham

=== Women's singles ===
Women's results
Rank	Skater
1st place, gold medalist(s)	Margaret Bennett
2nd place, silver medalist(s)	Louise Weigel
3rd place, bronze medalist(s)	Grace E. Madden
4	Estelle Weigel
5	Audrey Peppe
6	Gordon
7	Hoyt
8	Follett
9	Herbst
10	Sherman
11	Turner

=== Pairs ===
Pairs' results
Rank	Team
1st place, gold medalist(s)	Nancy Follett; F. Ashton Parmenter
2nd place, silver medalist(s)	Ethel R. Bijur; Bedell H. Harned
3rd place, bronze medalist(s)	Gertrude Dutton; Harold Hartshorne
