= 1933 U.S. Figure Skating Championships =

Figure skating competition

- Type: National Championship
- Date: March 17 – 18
- Season: 1932–33
- Location: New Haven, Connecticut
- Host: New Haven Figure Skating Club

Champions
- Men's singles: Roger F. Turner (Senior) & William Swallender (Junior)
- Women's singles: Maribel Vinson (Senior) & Estelle Weigel (Junior)
- Pairs: Maribel Vinson and George E. B. Hill (Senior) & Eva Schwerdt and William H. Bruns (Junior)
- Ice dance: Suzanne Davis and Frederick Goodridge
- Previous: 1932 U.S. Championships
- Next: 1934 U.S. Championships

The 1933 U.S. Figure Skating Championships were held from March 17-18 in New Haven, Connecticut. Gold, silver, and bronze medals were awarded in men's singles and women's singles at the senior, junior, and novice levels, pair skating at the senior and junior levels, and ice dance at the senior level.

== Senior results ==
=== Men's singles ===
Men's results
Rank	Skater
1st place, gold medalist(s)	Roger F. Turner
2nd place, silver medalist(s)	J. Lester Madden
3rd place, bronze medalist(s)	Robin Lee

=== Women's singles ===
Women's results
Rank	Skater
1st place, gold medalist(s)	Maribel Y. Vinson
2nd place, silver medalist(s)	Suzanne Davis
3rd place, bronze medalist(s)	Louise Weigel
4	Hulda Berger

=== Pairs ===
Pairs' results
Rank	Team
1st place, gold medalist(s)	Maribel Y. Vinson; George E. B. Hill
2nd place, silver medalist(s)	Grace E. Madden; J. Lester Madden
3rd place, bronze medalist(s)	Gertrude Meredith; Joseph K. Savage
4	Nancy Follett; Fred A. Parmenter

=== Ice dance ===
Ice dance results
Rank	Team
1st place, gold medalist(s)	Suzanne Davis; Frederick Goodridge
2nd place, silver medalist(s)	Gertrude Meredith; Joseph K. Savage
3rd place, bronze medalist(s)	Grace E. Madden; J. Lester Madden

== Junior results ==
=== Men's singles ===
Men's results
Rank	Skater
1st place, gold medalist(s)	William Swallender
2nd place, silver medalist(s)	Bruce Mapes
3rd place, bronze medalist(s)	Lyman Wakefield
4	Richard L. Hapgood
5	George Boltres
6	A. Vitvitsky
7	R. Janson
8	A. Janson

=== Women's singles ===
Women's results
Rank	Skater
1st place, gold medalist(s)	Estelle Weigel
2nd place, silver medalist(s)	Valerie Jones
3rd place, bronze medalist(s)	Grace Madden
4	Audrey Peppe

=== Pairs ===
Pairs' results
Rank	Team
1st place, gold medalist(s)	Eva Schwerdt; William H. Bruns
2nd place, silver medalist(s)	Polly Blodgett; Bernard Fox
3rd place, bronze medalist(s)	Jane Nicholson; E. A. Hellmund
4	G. Dutton; Harold Hartshorne
5	Wilkinson; Wilkinson
6	Salsinger; H. E. Cook
7	M. Davenport; H. Davenport
