= 1934 U.S. Figure Skating Championships =

Figure skating competition

- Type: National Championship
- Date: March 9 – 10
- Season: 1933–34
- Location: Philadelphia, Pennsylvania

Champions
- Men's singles: Roger F. Turner (Senior) & George R. Boltres (Junior)
- Women's singles: Suzanne Davis (Senior) & Valerie Jones (Junior)
- Pairs: Grace Madden and J. Lester Madden (Senior) & Polly Blodgett and Roger F. Turner (Junior)
- Ice dance: Suzanne Davis and Frederick Goodridge
- Previous: 1933 U.S. Championships
- Next: 1935 U.S. Championships

The 1934 U.S. Figure Skating Championships were held from March 9-10 in Philadelphia, Pennsylvania. Gold, silver, and bronze medals were awarded in men's singles and women's singles at the senior, junior, and novice levels, pair skating at the senior and junior levels, and ice dance at the senior level.

== Senior results ==
=== Men's singles ===
Men's results
Rank	Skater
1st place, gold medalist(s)	Roger F. Turner
2nd place, silver medalist(s)	Robin Lee
3rd place, bronze medalist(s)	George E. B. Hill
4	J. Lester Madden
5	William Swallender
6	William J. Nagle

=== Women's singles ===
Women's results
Rank	Skater
1st place, gold medalist(s)	Suzanne Davis
2nd place, silver medalist(s)	Louise Weigel
3rd place, bronze medalist(s)	Estelle Weigel
4	Audrey Peppe
5	Hulda Berger

=== Pairs ===
Pairs' results
Rank	Team
1st place, gold medalist(s)	Grace E. Madden; J. Lester Madden
2nd place, silver medalist(s)	Eva Schwerdt; William H. Bruns

=== Ice dance ===
Ice dance results
Rank	Team
1st place, gold medalist(s)	Suzanne Davis; Frederick Goodridge
2nd place, silver medalist(s)	Grace E. Madden; J. Lester Madden
3rd place, bronze medalist(s)	R. English; L. Fogassey

== Junior results ==
=== Men's singles ===
Men's results
Rank	Skater
1st place, gold medalist(s)	George R. Boltres
2nd place, silver medalist(s)	Wilfred MacDonald
3rd place, bronze medalist(s)	Richard L. Hapgood
4	Arthur F. Preusch
5	Roland Janson
6	Arthur E. Janson
7	Robert Rothman

=== Women's singles ===
Women's results
Rank	Skater
1st place, gold medalist(s)	Valerie Jones
2nd place, silver medalist(s)	Frances Johnson
3rd place, bronze medalist(s)	Polly Blodgett
4	Grace Madden
5	A. Kloss
6	K. Durbrow
7	A. Haroldson
8	E. Berger
9	M. Sherman

=== Pairs ===
Pairs' results
Rank	Team
1st place, gold medalist(s)	Polly Blodgett; Roger Turner
2nd place, silver medalist(s)	Oliver Haupt; Jean Schulte
3rd place, bronze medalist(s)	R. English; L. Fogassey
4	Mrs. Arthur Preusch; Arthur Preusch
5	E. Frazier; R. Ruhnka
