= 1943 U.S. Figure Skating Championships =

Figure skating competition

- Type: National championships
- Date: March 6 – 8
- Season: 1942–43
- Location: New York City, New York
- Host: Skating Club of New York
- Venue: Madison Square Garden

Champions
- Men's singles: Arthur Vaughn Jr. (Senior) & Edward LeMaire (Junior)
- Women's singles: Gretchen Merrill (Senior) & Hildegarde Balmain (Junior)
- Pairs: Doris Schubach and Walter Noffke (Senior) & Betty Schalow and Arthur Preusch Jr. (Junior)
- Ice dance: Marcella May and James Lochead Jr. (Senior) & Dorothy Glazier and Lyman Wakefield Jr. (Junior)
- Previous: 1942 U.S. Championships
- Next: 1944 U.S. Championships

The 1943 U.S. Figure Skating Championships were held from March 6–8 at Madison Square Garden in New York City. Gold, silver, and bronze medals were awarded in men's singles, women's singles, pair skating, and ice dance at the senior, junior, and novice levels. This was the first year that the Silver dance was contested at the U.S. Championships.

== Senior results ==
=== Men's singles ===
Men's results
Rank	Skater
1st place, gold medalist(s)	Arthur Vaughn Jr.
2nd place, silver medalist(s)	Arthur Preusch Jr.
3rd place, bronze medalist(s)	William Nagle

=== Women's singles ===
Women's results
Rank	Skater
1st place, gold medalist(s)	Gretchen Merrill
2nd place, silver medalist(s)	Dorothy Goos
3rd place, bronze medalist(s)	Janette Ahrens
4	Ramona Allen
5	Phebe Tucker
6	Jane Zeiser
7	Dorothy Glazier

=== Pairs ===
Pairs' results
Rank	Team
1st place, gold medalist(s)	Doris Schubach; Walter Noffke
2nd place, silver medalist(s)	Janette Ahrens; Robert Uppgren
3rd place, bronze medalist(s)	Dorothy Goos; Edward LeMaire

=== Ice dance (Gold dance) ===
Ice dance results
Rank	Team
1st place, gold medalist(s)	Marcella May; James Lochead Jr.
2nd place, silver medalist(s)	Marjorie Parker Smith; Joseph Savage
3rd place, bronze medalist(s)	Nettie Prantel Meier; Harold Hartshorne
4	Mary McLaughlin; Jack Andresen
5	Elizabeth Dripps; J.J. Kohlhas
6	Barbara Griffin; Louis Cody

== Junior results ==
=== Men's singles ===
Men's results
Rank	Skater
1st place, gold medalist(s)	Edward LeMaire
2nd place, silver medalist(s)	Marcus Nelson
3rd place, bronze medalist(s)	James Lochead Jr.
4	Wilhelm Junker

=== Women's singles ===
Women's results
Rank	Skater
1st place, gold medalist(s)	Hildegarde Balmain
2nd place, silver medalist(s)	Mabel MacPherson
3rd place, bronze medalist(s)	Betsy Nichols
4	Barbara Raymond
5	Shirley Lander
6	Yvonne Sherman
7	Margaret Grant
8	Fay Kirby
9	Beverly Licht
10	Britta Lundequist
11	Patty Sonnekson

=== Pairs ===
Pairs' results
Rank	Team
1st place, gold medalist(s)	Betty Schalow; Arthur Preusch Jr.
2nd place, silver medalist(s)	Ruth Flint; Lyman Wakefield Jr.
3rd place, bronze medalist(s)	Karol Kennedy; Peter Kennedy
4	Donna Jean Pospisil; Jean-Pierre Brunet
5	Hildegarde Balmain; Robert Swenning
6	Marilyn Grace; James Lochead Jr.
7	Ann Robinson; John House
8	Barbara deJulio; Austin Holt

=== Ice dance (Silver dance) ===
Ice dance results
Rank	Team
1st place, gold medalist(s)	Dorothy Glazier; Lyman Wakefield Jr.
2nd place, silver medalist(s)	Nancy Blair; Michael McGean
3rd place, bronze medalist(s)	Kathe Mehl; Allan Van Alstyne
4	Marjorie House; John House
5	Betty Jean Higgins; Vernon Duckett
6	Betty Jane Courtright; Peter Girardot
7	Janet Raymond; John Gayton
8	Annemarie Junker; Wilhelm Junker
9	Jeanne Hart; Ralph Teal
