= 1937 U.S. Figure Skating Championships =

Figure skating competition

- Type: National championships
- Date: February 12 – 13
- Season: 1936–37
- Location: Chicago, Illinois
- Host: Chicago Figure Skating Club
- Venue: Chicago Stadium

Champions
- Men's singles: Robin Lee (Senior) & Ollie E. Haupt Jr. (Junior)
- Women's singles: Maribel Vinson (Senior) & Joan Tozzer (Junior)
- Pairs: Maribel Vinson and George Hill (Senior) & Ardelle Kloss and Roland Janson (Junior)
- Ice dance: Nettie Prantel and Harold Hartshorne
- Previous: 1936 U.S. Championships
- Next: 1938 U.S. Championships

The 1937 U.S. Figure Skating Championships were held from February 12-13 at the Chicago Stadium in Chicago, Illinois. Gold, silver, and bronze medals were awarded in men's singles and women's singles at the senior, junior, and novice levels, pair skating at the senior and junior levels, and ice dance at the senior level.

== Senior results ==
=== Men's singles ===
Men's results
Rank	Skater
1st place, gold medalist(s)	Robin Lee
2nd place, silver medalist(s)	Erie Reiter
3rd place, bronze medalist(s)	William J. Nagle

=== Women's singles ===
Women's results
Rank	Skater
1st place, gold medalist(s)	Maribel Vinson
2nd place, silver medalist(s)	Polly Blodgett
3rd place, bronze medalist(s)	Katherine Durbrow

=== Pairs ===
Pairs' results
Rank	Team
1st place, gold medalist(s)	Maribel Vinson; George Hill
2nd place, silver medalist(s)	Grace Madden; J. Lester Madden
3rd place, bronze medalist(s)	Joan Tozzer; M. Bernard Fox
4	Polly Blodgett; Roger Turner
5	Mrs. William Bruns; William Bruns

=== Ice dance ===
Ice dance results
Rank	Team
1st place, gold medalist(s)	Nettie Prantel; Harold Hartshorne
2nd place, silver medalist(s)	Marjorie Parker; Joseph Savage
3rd place, bronze medalist(s)	Ardelle Kloss; Roland Janson

== Junior results ==
=== Men's singles ===
Men's results
Rank	Skater
1st place, gold medalist(s)	Ollie E. Haupt Jr.
2nd place, silver medalist(s)	Eugene Turner
3rd place, bronze medalist(s)	Eugene Reichel

=== Women's singles ===
Women's results
Rank	Skater
1st place, gold medalist(s)	Joan Tozzer
2nd place, silver medalist(s)	Frances Johnson
3rd place, bronze medalist(s)	Jane Vaughn
4	Charlotte Walther
5	Ardelle Kloss

=== Pairs ===
Pairs' results
Rank	Team
1st place, gold medalist(s)	Ardelle Kloss; Roland Janson
2nd place, silver medalist(s)	Helen Barrett; Ted Harper
3rd place, bronze medalist(s)	Marjorie Parker; Howard Meredith
4	Mrs. Eduardo Hellmund; Eduardo Hellmund
5	Mrs. James Lowden; James Lowden
6	Frances Johnson; Eugene Reichel
7	Angeline Knapp; Jay Pike
8	Mrs. Arthur Preusch; Arthur Preusch
