= 1927 U.S. Figure Skating Championships =

Figure skating competition

- Type: National Championship
- Date: February 10 – 11
- Season: 1926-27
- Location: New Haven, Connecticut & New York City, New York
- Venue: New Haven Arena & Madison Square Garden

Champions
- Men's singles: Nathaniel William Niles (Senior) & Frederick Goodridge (Junior)
- Women's singles: Beatrix Loughran (Senior) & Suzanne Davis (Junior)
- Pairs: Theresa Weld Blanchard and Nathaniel William Niles (Senior) & Maribel Vinson and Thornton Coolidge (Junior)
- Previous: 1926 U.S. Championships
- Next: 1928 U.S. Championships

The 1927 U.S. Figure Skating Championships were held from February 10-11 at the New Haven Arena in New Haven, Connecticut. Gold, silver, and bronze medals were awarded in men's singles and women's singles at the senior, junior, and novice levels and in pair skating at the senior and junior levels.

== Senior results ==
=== Men ===
Rank	Name
1	Nathaniel William Niles
2	Roger F. Turner
3	George Braakman
4	Chris I. Christenson
5	Ferrier T. Martin

=== Ladies ===
Rank	Name
1	Beatrix Loughran
2	Maribel Vinson
3	Theresa Weld
4	Rosalie Knapp

=== Pairs ===
Rank	Name
1	Theresa Weld Blanchard / Nathaniel William Niles
2	Beatrix Loughran / Raymond Harvey
3	Ada Bauman / George Braakman
4	Grace Munstock / Joel B. Liberman
5	Mrs. Ferrier T. Martin / Ferrier T. Martin

== Junior results ==
=== Men ===
Rank	Name
1	Frederick Goodridge
2	Gail Borden
3	Roy Shipstad
4	J. Lester Madden
5	Raymond Harvey
6	Thornton Coolidge
7	Joseph K. Savage
8	George E. B. Hill
9	Robert Reed
10	William J. Nagle
11	Edmond F. Brigham
12	Paul Carriere
13	Luther D. Shepard

=== Ladies ===
Rank	Name
1	Suzanne Davis
2	Grace Munstock
3	Margaret Bennett
4	M. Herbst

=== Pairs ===
Rank	Name
1	Maribel Vinson / Thornton Coolidge
2	A. Boyrer / Gail Borden
3	Dorothy Weld / Richard L. Hapgood
4	Grace Madden / J. Lester Madden
