= 1939 U.S. Figure Skating Championships =

Figure skating competition

- Type: National championships
- Date: January 19 – 21
- Season: 1938–39
- Location: St. Paul, Minnesota
- Host: St. Paul Figure Skating Club

Champions
- Men's singles: Robin H. Lee (Senior) & Arthur R. Vaughn (Junior)
- Women's singles: Joan Tozzer (Senior) & Gretchen Merrill (Junior)
- Pairs: Joan Tozzer and M. Bernard Fox (Senior) & Betty Lee Bennett and John Kinney (Junior)
- Ice dance: Sandy MacDonald and Harold Hartshorne
- Previous: 1938 U.S. Championships
- Next: 1940 U.S. Championships

The 1939 U.S. Figure Skating Championships were held from January 19-21 at the St. Paul Figure Skating Club in St. Paul, Minnesota. Gold, silver, and bronze medals were awarded in men's singles and women's singles at the senior, junior, and novice levels, pair skating at the senior and junior levels, and ice dance at the senior level.

== Senior results ==
=== Men's singles ===
Men's results
Rank	Skater
1st place, gold medalist(s)	Robin H. Lee
2nd place, silver medalist(s)	Ollie E. Haupt Jr.
3rd place, bronze medalist(s)	Eugene Turner
4	William J. Nagle

=== Women's singles ===
Women's results
Rank	Skater
1st place, gold medalist(s)	Joan Tozzer
2nd place, silver medalist(s)	Audrey Peppe
3rd place, bronze medalist(s)	Charlotte Walther
4	Jane Vaughn
5	Polly Blodgett

=== Pairs ===
Pairs' results
Rank	Team
1st place, gold medalist(s)	Joan Tozzer; M. Bernard Fox
2nd place, silver medalist(s)	Mrs. William Penn-Gaskell Hall; William Penn-Gaskell Hall
3rd place, bronze medalist(s)	Mrs. William H. Bruns Jr.; William H. Bruns Jr.

=== Ice dance (Gold dance) ===
Ice dance results
Rank	Team
1st place, gold medalist(s)	Sandy MacDonald; Harold Hartshorne
2nd place, silver medalist(s)	Nettie C. Prantel; Joseph K. Savage
3rd place, bronze medalist(s)	Marjorie Parker; Joseph K. Savage
4	Edith Preusch; Arthur F. Preusch

== Junior results ==
=== Men's singles ===
Men's results
Rank	Skater
1st place, gold medalist(s)	Arthur R. Vaughn
2nd place, silver medalist(s)	Arthur Preusch Jr.
3rd place, bronze medalist(s)	Bud Brennan
4	Robert Premer

=== Women's singles ===
Women's results
Rank	Skater
1st place, gold medalist(s)	Gretchen Merrill
2nd place, silver medalist(s)	Dorothy Snell
3rd place, bronze medalist(s)	Shirley Bowman
4	Mary Louise Premer
5	Phebe Tucker
6	Elinor Leeds Weiler
7	Dorothy L. Glazier
8	Nancy Meyer

=== Pairs ===
Pairs' results
Rank	Team
1st place, gold medalist(s)	Betty Lee Bennett; John Kinney
2nd place, silver medalist(s)	Ruth English; Louis Pitts
3rd place, bronze medalist(s)	Nettie Prantel; George Boltres
4	Joane Frazier; James Greene
5	Dorothy Beymer; Ralph Beymer
6	Angeline Knapp; J. N. Pike
7	Enola Schramm; Rae Schramm
