= 1940 U.S. Figure Skating Championships =

Figure skating competition

- Type: National championships
- Date: February 9 – 10
- Season: 1939-40
- Location: Cleveland, Ohio
- Host: Cleveland Skating Club

Champions
- Men's singles: Eugene Turner (Senior) & Bobby Specht (Junior)
- Women's singles: Joan Tozzer (Senior) & Ramona Allen (Junior)
- Pairs: Joan Tozzer and M. Bernard Fox (Senior) & Dorothy Glazier and Stephen Tanner (Junior)
- Ice dance: Sandy MacDonald and Harold Hartshorne
- Previous: 1939 U.S. Championships
- Next: 1941 U.S. Championships

The 1940 U.S. Figure Skating Championships were held from February 9-10 at the Cleveland Skating Club in Cleveland, Ohio. Gold, silver, and bronze medals were awarded in men's singles and women's singles at the senior, junior, and novice levels, pair skating at the senior and junior levels, and ice dance at the senior level.

== Senior results ==
=== Men's singles ===
Men's results
Rank	Skater
1st place, gold medalist(s)	Eugene Turner
2nd place, silver medalist(s)	Ollie E. Haupt Jr.
3rd place, bronze medalist(s)	Skippy Baxter
4	Arthur R. Vaughn Jr.
5	William J. Nagle

=== Women's singles ===
Women's results
Rank	Skater
1st place, gold medalist(s)	Joan Tozzer
2nd place, silver medalist(s)	Heddy Stenuf
3rd place, bronze medalist(s)	Jane Vaughn
4	Gretchen Merrill
5	Charlotte Walther
6	Dorothy Snell

=== Pairs ===
Pairs' results
Rank	Team
1st place, gold medalist(s)	Joan Tozzer; M. Bernard Fox
2nd place, silver medalist(s)	Heddy Stenuf; Skippy Baxter
3rd place, bronze medalist(s)	Mrs. William H. Bruns Jr.; William H. Bruns Jr.
4	Nancy Follett; Roger F. Turner

=== Ice dance (Gold dance) ===
Ice dance results
Rank	Team
1st place, gold medalist(s)	Sandy MacDonald; Harold Hartshorne
2nd place, silver medalist(s)	Nettie C. Prantel; George R. Boltres
3rd place, bronze medalist(s)	Vernafay Thysell; Paul F. Harrington
4	Barbara Ann Gingg; J. Drexel Gibbins

== Junior results ==
=== Men's singles ===
Men's results
Rank	Skater
1st place, gold medalist(s)	Bobby Specht
2nd place, silver medalist(s)	Murray Galbraith
3rd place, bronze medalist(s)	Sheldon Galbraith
4	Arthur F. Preusch Jr.
5	Robert Uppgren
6	Robert F. Premer

=== Women's singles ===
Women's results
Rank	Skater
1st place, gold medalist(s)	Ramona Allen
2nd place, silver medalist(s)	Betsy Nichols
3rd place, bronze medalist(s)	Roberta Jenks
4	Dorothy Glazier
5	Barbara Ann Gingg
6	Phebe Tucker
7	Yvonne Sherman
8	Dorothy B. Lee
9	Shirley Bowman
10	Joan Mitchell
11	Mary Louise Premer
12	Marjory E. Newell
13	Gloria Haupt

=== Pairs ===
Pairs' results
Rank	Team
1st place, gold medalist(s)	Dorothy Glazier; Stephen Tanner
2nd place, silver medalist(s)	Nettie C. Prantel; George R. Boltres
3rd place, bronze medalist(s)	Jean H. Matzke; Robert R. Matzke
4	Mrs. Howard E. Wilkinson; Howard E. Wilkinson
5	Joanne Frazier; James Greene
6	Angeline Knapp; J. N. Pike
7	Suzanne Uksila; Paul Pavliska
8	Dorothy Beymer; Ralph Beymer
