= 1946 U.S. Figure Skating Championships =

Figure skating competition

1946 US Figure Skating Championships
- Type: National Championship
- Date: February 28 – March 2
- Season: 1945-46
- Location: Chicago, Illinois
- Host: Chicago Figure Skating Club
- Venue: Chicago Stadium

Champions
- Men's singles: Richard Button (Senior); John Lettengarver (Junior)
- Women's singles: Gretchen Van Zandt Merrill (Senior); Barbara Jones (Junior)
- Pairs: Donna Jeanne Pospisil and Jean Pierre Brunet (Senior); Yvonne Sherman and Robert Swenning (Junior)
- Ice dance: Anne Davies and Carleton Hoffner Jr. (Senior); Vivian H. Queisser and Richard C. Queisser (Junior)
- Previous: 1945 U.S. Championships
- Next: 1947 U.S. Championships

The 1946 U.S. Figure Skating Championships were held from February 28-March 2 at the Chicago Stadium in Chicago, Illinois. Gold, silver, and bronze medals were awarded in four disciplines – men's singles, women's singles, pair skating, and ice dancing – across three levels: senior, junior, and novice. Senior Men's singles returned after a two year absence as the skaters returned from WWII.

== Senior results ==
=== Men ===
Rank	Name
1	Richard Button
2	James Lochead Jr.
3	John Tuckerman
4	Patrick Kazda

=== Women ===
Rank	Name
1	Gretchen Van Zandt Merrill
2	Janette Ahrens
3	Madelon Olson
4	Eileen Seigh
5	Roberta Jenks Burns

=== Pairs ===
Rank	Name
1	Donna Jean Pospisil / Jean Pierre Brunet
2	Karol Kennedy / Peter Kennedy
3	Patty Sonnekson / Charles W. Brinkman
4	Beverly Dean Osburn / Patrick Kazda

=== Ice dancing (Gold dance) ===
Rank	Name
1	Anne Davies / Carleton Hoffner Jr.
2	Lois Waring / Walter H. Bainbridge
3	Carmel Waterbury / Edward Bodel
4	Marcella May Willis / Frank H. Davenport

== Junior results ==
=== Men ===
Rank	Name
1	John Lettengarver
2	Charles W. Brinkman
3	Robert Swenning
4	Carleton Hoffner Jr.

=== Women ===
Rank	Name
1	Barbara Jones
2	Yvonne Sherman
3	Shirley Irene Lander
4	Lois Johnson
5	Jane Weiss
6	Joan Swanston
7	Helen Uhl
8	Bonnie Paterson
9	Carole Gregory
10	Barbara Uhl
11	Donna Jeanne Pospisil
12	Slavka Kohout
13	Kay Lindstrom
14	Betty Jane Ricker
15	Carolyn Welch

=== Pairs ===
Rank	Name
1	Yvonne Sherman / Robert Swenning
2	Harriet Sutton / John Lettengarver
3	Barbara De Julio / Herman Maricich
4	Anne Davies / Carleton C. Hoffner Jr.
5	Jane Schellentrager / Riki Bliss
6	Joan Erickson / Joan Erickson
7	Marilyn Thomsen / Marlyn Thomsen
8	Nancy Sue Jenkins / Hayes Alan Jenkins

=== Ice dancing (Silver dance) ===
Rank	Name
1	Vivian H. Queisser / Richard C. Queisser
2	Vera Halliday / E. Tefft Barker
3	Camilfa Cliff / Sidney J. Moore
4	Sidney J. Moore / Donald E. Laws
