= 1945 U.S. Figure Skating Championships =

Figure skating competition

1945 US Figure Skating Championships
- Type: National Championship
- Date: March 2 – March 5
- Season: 1944-45
- Location: New York City, New York
- Host: Skating Club of New York
- Venue: Madison Square Garden

Champions
- Men's singles: None (Senior); Richard Button (Junior)
- Women's singles: Gretchen Van Zandt Merrill (Senior); Eileen Seigh (Junior)
- Pairs: Donna Jeanne Pospisil and Jean Pierre Brunet (Senior); Betty Jean Higgins and Lyman E. Wakefield Jr. (Junior)
- Ice dance: Kathe Mehl Williams and Robert Swenning (Senior); Patsy Jones and Walter H. Bainbridge Jr. (Junior)
- Previous: 1944 U.S. Championships
- Next: 1946 U.S. Championships

The 1945 U.S. Figure Skating Championships were held from March 2-5 at Madison Square Garden in New York City. Gold, silver, and bronze medals were awarded in three disciplines – women's singles, pair skating, and ice dancing – across three levels: senior, junior, and novice. For the second year in a row, Men's singles was only competed for at the junior and novice levels, as most of the country's top male figure skaters were in the military due to WWII.

== Senior results ==
=== Women ===
Rank	Name
1	Gretchen Van Zandt Merrill
2	Janette Ahrens
3	Madelon Olson
4	Margaret Grant
5	Phebe Tucker
6	Dorothy Glazier

=== Pairs ===
Rank	Name
1	Donna Jean Pospisil / Jean Pierre Brunet
2	Ann McGean / Michael McGean
3	Marcella May / James Lochead Jr.

=== Ice dancing (Gold dance) ===
Rank	Name
1	Kathe Mehl Williams / Robert Swenning
2	Marcella May / James Lochead Jr.
3	Mary Andresen / Jack Andresen

== Junior results ==
=== Men ===
Rank	Name
1	Richard Button
2	Michael McGean
3	Robert Swenning

=== Women ===
Rank	Name
1	Eileen Seigh
2	Yvonne Sherman
3	Joan Swanston
4	Shirley Lander
5	Barbara Uhl
6	Jeanne Leroux
7	Joan Yocum
8	Helen Uhl
9	Margaret Field
10	Charlotte Kaye
11	Beverley Compton

=== Pairs ===
Rank	Name
1	Betty Jean Higgins / Lyman E. Wakefield Jr.
2	Yvonne Sherman / Robert Swenning
3	Karol Kennedy / Peter Kennedy
4	Yvonne Cameron / Dean Cameron
5	Nancy Lemmon / Charles W. Brinkman
6	Sally Blair / Huntington Blair
7	Anne Davies / Carleton C. Hoffner Jr.
8	Nancy Sue Jenkins / Hayes Alan Jenkins

=== Ice dancing (Silver dance) ===
Rank	Name
1	Patsy Jones / Walter H. Bainbridge Jr.
2	Yvonne Cameron / Dean Cameron
3	Vivian Halliday / Richard C. Queisser
4	Ruth Parkinson / David J. Speck
