= Robin Lee =

Robin Lee may refer to:

- Robin Lee (figure skater) (1919–1997), American figure skater
- Robin Lee (singer) (born 1963), American country music singer and songwriter, or her self-titled debut album

== See also ==
- Robyn Lee (born 1999), Zimbabwean swimmer
