= Militano =

Militano is an Italian surname. Notable people with the surname include:

- Mark Militano (born 1954), American figure skater
- Melissa Militano (1955–2024), American figure skater
