= 1924 U.S. Figure Skating Championships =

- Type: National Championship
- Date: February 17 – February 19
- Location: Philadelphia, Pennsylvania
- Previous: 1923 U.S. Championships
- Next: 1925 U.S. Championships

The 1924 U.S. Figure Skating Championships were held on February 17 through 19 in Philadelphia, Pennsylvania.

== Senior results ==
=== Men ===
Nathaniel Niles led in the figures portion of the competition, but was overtaken by Sherwin Badger, who excelled in the free skate.

Rank	Name
1	Sherwin Badger
2	Nathaniel Niles
3	Chris Christenson
4	George Braakman

=== Ladies ===
Rank	Name
1	Theresa Weld Blanchard
2	Rosalie Knapp

=== Pairs ===
Rank	Name
1	Theresa Weld Blanchard / Nathaniel Niles
2	Grace Munstock / Joel Liberman

== Junior results ==
=== Men ===
Rank	Name
1	Egbert Carey
2	Charles Wyman
3	Heaton Robertson
4	R.H. Turner
5 (tie)	Richard Hapgood
5 (tie)	Ferrier Martin
7	Savage
8	Lee
9	Coolidge

=== Ladies ===
Rank	Name
1	Maribel Vinson
2	Guinevere Knott
3	Julia Honan
4	Edith Nichols
5	Ada Bauman
6	Gertrude Meredith
7	Berger
8	MacKenzie
9	Sloan
10	Knapp
11	Herbst
12	Bieg
13	Pancoast

=== Pairs ===
Rank	Name
1	Ada Bauman / George Braakman
2	Goode / Greene
3	Howe / Howe
4	Carey / Carey
5	Sloan / Robertson
6	Weld / Hapgood
