= 1926 U.S. Figure Skating Championships =

- Type: National Championship
- Date: February 15 – February 16
- Location: Boston
- Previous: 1925 U.S. Championships
- Next: 1927 U.S. Championships

The 1926 U.S. Figure Skating Championships were held on February 15 and 16 in Boston.

== Senior results ==
=== Men ===
Rank	Name
1	Chris Christenson
2	Nathaniel Niles
3	Ferrier Martin

=== Ladies ===
Rank	Name
1	Beatrix Loughran
2	Theresa Weld Blanchard
3	Maribel Vinson
4	Lillian Cramer

=== Pairs ===
Rank	Name
1	Theresa Weld Blanchard / Nathaniel Niles
2	Sidney Goode / James Greene
3	Grace Munstock / Joel Liberman

== Junior results ==
=== Men ===
Rank	Name
1	Roger Turner
2	Joseph Savage
3	Heaton Robertson
4	Thornton Coolidge
5	Raymond Harvey
6	J.C. Hawthorne
7	E.F. Brigham
8	H.E. Schleicher
9	Dr. L.D. Shepard

=== Ladies ===
Rank	Name
1	Julia Honan
2	Grace Munstock
3	Hudla Berger
4	M. Herbst
5	Virginia Slattery

=== Pairs ===
Rank	Name
1	Beatrix Loughran / Raymond Harvey
2	Dorothy Weld / Richard Hapgood
3	Virginia Slattery / F.T. Martin
4	Gertrude Dutton / T.L. Coolidge
5	Ethel Bijur / B.H. Harned
6	Molly Frothingham / B.H. Dickson
