= Mark Militano =

American pair skater

Personal information
- Full name: Mark William Militano
- Born: March 28, 1954 (age 72) Rockville Centre, New York
- Height: 5 ft 5.5 in (166 cm)

Figure skating career
- Country: United States
- Skating club: SC of New York
Medal record
Pairs' Figure skating
Representing United States
North American Championships
Silver medal – second place	1971 Peterborough	Pairs

Mark William Militano (born March 28, 1954, in Rockville Centre, New York) is an American pair skater. With sister Melissa Militano, he is the 1973 U.S. national champion. They represented the United States at the 1972 Winter Olympics where they placed 7th.

Militano began skating seriously by the age of 7. Two years later, he formed a pair with his sister Melissa. They lived on Long Island and were trained by Peter Dunfield at Sky Rink in New York City.

Militano had an early interest in composing music, and he and his sister skated to one of his compositions when they were still in their teens. Later in life, Militano wrote music that was used by Nancy Kerrigan for her short programs at both the 1992 and 1994 Winter Olympics.

As of 2010, Militano and his wife, former competitor Jana Sjodin, run a coaching, music, and choreography business in the Minneapolis area, Milimar Inc.

== Competitive highlights ==
(with Melissa Militano)

International
Event	1969	1970	1971	1972	1973
Winter Olympics				7th	
World Championships	8th	8th	6th	9th	8th
North American Champ.	4th		2nd		
National
U.S. Championships	3rd	2nd	2nd	2nd	1st
