= Carmel Bodel =

American figure skater

Personal information
- Full name: Carmel Waterbury Bodel
- Born: 1912
- Died: October 13, 2013 (aged 100–101) Chico, California, U.S.

Figure skating career
- Country: United States
- Partner: Edward Bodel
Medal record
Figure skating
Ice dancing
Representing the United States
World Championships
Bronze medal – third place	1954 Oslo	Ice dancing
North American Championships
Gold medal – first place	1955 Regina	Ice dancing
Bronze medal – third place	1953 Cleveland	Ice dancing
Gold medal – first place	1951 Calgary	Ice dancing

Carmel Waterbury Bodel (1912 - 2013) was an American figure skater, competing in ice dance with Edward Bodel. At the U.S. Figure Skating Championships, the Bodels won the bronze medal in 1946 and 1949, the year they married each other, and the gold medal three times, in 1951, 1954, and 1955. They came in first place at the North American Championships in 1951 and 1955 and won the bronze medal at the 1954 World Figure Skating Championships.

== Competitive highlights ==
(with Edward)

Event	1946	1949	1951	1952	1953	1954	1955	1956	1957
World Championships				4th	7th	3rd	4th	6th	7th
North American Championships			1st		3rd		1st		
U.S. Championships	3rd	3rd	1st	3rd	3rd	1st	1st	2nd	4th
