= Carolyn Welch =

American figure skater (1922–2020)

Carolyn Mae Welch (September 11, 1922 - May 7, 2020) was an American figure skater. She competed in pairs and won the bronze medals at the 1947 U.S. Figure Skating Championships with partner Charles Brinkman.

== Results ==
(Pairs with Brinkman)

Event	1947
U.S. Championships	3rd
