= Skating Club of New York =

Organization in New York City

- Formation: 1863
- Location: New York City
- Website: www.thescny.org

The Skating Club of New York is a figure skating club in New York City. It was founded in 1863 and is the second oldest skating club in the United States. It was one of the founding members of the United States Figure Skating Association. The club has EIN 13-1692586 as a 501(c)(3) Public Charity. In 2023 it claimed $583,299 in total revenue and $375,743 in total assets.

Among the skaters who have represented the club in competition are U.S. national champions Scott Allen, Sherwin Badger, Jean-Pierre Brunet, Jason Dungjen, Harold Hartshorne, Kyoko Ina, Sonya Klopfer, Robin Lee, Beatrix Loughran, Sandy MacDonald, Rocky Marval, Mark Militano, Melissa Militano, Marjorie Parker, Donna Jeanne Pospisil, Nettie Prantel, Joseph Savage, Yvonne Sherman, Robert Swenning, Johnny Weir, Kathe Williams, Elaine Zayak, Adam Rippon, Maia Shibutani, and Alex Shibutani, plus Olympic champions Sarah Hughes, Carol Heiss, and Dorothy Hamill.
