= U.S. Figure Skating Championships =

Recurring figure skating competition

- Status: Active
- Genre: National championships
- Frequency: Annual
- Country: United States
- Inaugurated: 1914
- Previous event: 2026 U.S. Championships
- Next event: 2027 U.S. Championships
- Organizer: U.S. Figure Skating

The U.S. Figure Skating Championships are an annual figure skating competition organized by U.S. Figure Skating to crown the national champions of the United States. The first U.S. Championships were held in 1914 in New Haven, Connecticut, and featured the men's, women's, and pairs events. Skaters may qualify for the national championships by competing at either the Pacific Coast Sectional Finals, Eastern Sectional Finals, Midwestern Sectional Finals, U.S. Ice Dance Finals, or U.S. Pairs Finals. The results of the competition are among the criteria used to determine the American teams to the World Championships, Four Continents Championships, and Winter Olympics. They have been held without interruption since 1920.

Medals are awarded in men's singles, women's singles, pair skating, and ice dance at the senior level. Dick Button and Roger Turner are tied for winning the most U.S. Championship titles in men's singles (with seven each), while Maribel Vinson and Michelle Kwan are tied for winning the titles in women's singles (with nine each). Theresa Weld-Blanchard and Nathaniel Niles hold the record in pair skating (with nine), while Madison Chock and Evan Bates hold the record in ice dance (with seven).

== History ==
The inaugural U.S. Championships took place in 1914 in New Haven, Connecticut, and was contested by skaters from both the United States and Canada. Norman Scott of Canada won the men's event, as well as the pairs' event with his partner, Jeanne Chevalier. Theresa Weld of the United States won the women's event. No competitions were held from 1915 to 1917 due to World War I, nor again in 1919. The championships returned in 1920 and have been held without interruption since. Ice dance was added in 1936, incorporating the waltz, fourteenstep, tango, and foxtrot. A live orchestra provided the music. There were no full cancellations of the championships due to World War II as there had been during World War I; only the senior men's events were cancelled in 1944 and 1945, because all but one of the skaters who would have competed had enlisted in the military. Arthur Preusch II, the only senior men's competitor who had remained in the United States, performed instead in exhibition.

Approximately two weeks after the 1961 U.S. Championships, the airplane carrying most of the U.S. national team to the World Championships in Prague crashed while on approach to Brussels Airport in Belgium. All passengers on board Sabena Flight 548 were killed, including all of the recently crowned U.S. champions: men's champion Bradley Lord, women's champion Laurence Owen, pairs champions Maribel Owen and Dudley Richards, and ice dance champions Diane Sherbloom and Larry Pierce. Nine-time U.S. champion and coach Maribel Vinson-Owen, mother of both Laurence and Maribel, was on the flight as well. Also killed were men's silver medalist Gregory Kelley, women's silver medalist Stephanie Westerfeld, women's bronze medalist Rhode Lee Michelson, pairs silver medalists Ila Ray Hadley and Ray Hadley Jr., pairs bronze medalists Laurie Hickox and William Hickox, ice dance silver medalists Dona Lee Carrier and Roger Campbell, and ice dance bronze medalists Patricia Dineen and Robert Dineen, in addition to fourteen family members, coaches, and skating officials who were accompanying the team. Out of respect, the 1961 World Championships were cancelled the next day.

Beginning with the 1988 U.S. Championships, pewter medals have been awarded to the fourth-place finishers in each event. Compulsory figures, which had been a required element of men's and women's single skating since the championships began, were retired after the 1990 U.S. Championships, although they continued as a separate event for men and women from 1991 to 1999, when they were retired altogether.

On January 6, 1994, one day before she was scheduled to compete at the 1994 U.S. Championships, Nancy Kerrigan was struck above the knee by an assailant with a baton and was forced to withdraw from the competition. Subsequent investigations determined that the assailant had been hired by the ex-husband of fellow skater Tonya Harding with the intention of preventing Kerrigan from competing at the U.S. Championships and the upcoming Winter Olympics in Lillehammer. Although Harding originally won the women's event at the 1994 U.S. Championships, U.S. Figure Skating later stripped her of that title.

During the COVID-19 pandemic, the 2021 U.S. Championships were still held, albeit in a sealed arena with no live audience present. The sound of an audience was piped into the arena, seats were filled with fan cutouts, and the athletes' friends and families could be seen cheering them on via strategically-placed monitors.

Three days after the 2025 U.S. Championships, a group of twenty-eight skaters, coaches, and family members flying to Washington, D.C., were killed when their airplane collided with a military helicopter and crashed into the Potomac River. Coaches Evgenia Shishkova and Vadim Naumov, the parents of U.S. skater Maxim Naumov, who had just won the pewter medal in the senior men's event, were among those killed.

The 2027 U.S. Championships are scheduled to be held from January 5 to 10 at the Maverik Center in Salt Lake City, Utah.

== Qualification ==
Beginning with the 2022–23 season, skaters qualify for the U.S. Championships by competing in the National Qualifying Series (NQS), a series of regional competitions running from mid-July to early October. Skaters compete in one of three sections (Pacific Coast, Midwestern, or Eastern) based on geographic location. The highest-placed skaters and teams across all competitions advance to the NQS finals (Pacific Coast Sectional Finals, Eastern Sectional Finals, Midwestern Sectional Finals, U.S. Ice Dance Finals, or U.S. Pairs Finals). The top juvenile, intermediate, and novice skaters are invited to the National High Performance Development Camp, while junior and senior skaters advance to the U.S. Championships. Athletes may also receive a bye to the NQS finals by being assigned to and competing at an international assignment from an approved list.

Advancement to the U.S. Figure Skating Championships:

- Single skating: 18 spots available
  - Athletes receiving a bye
  - Top two from each section, plus the next best scores nationwide until the maximum number of entrants is met
- Pair skating: 12 spots available
  - Athletes receiving a bye
  - Next best scores from the NQS Finals until the maximum number of entrants is met
- Ice dance: 15 spots available
  - Athletes receiving a bye
  - Next best scores from the NQS Finals until the maximum number of entrants is met

Skaters can earn the right at the U.S. Championships without qualifying through a sectional championship by accomplishing any of the following:

1. Placing in the top five in their respective discipline at the previous U.S. Championships at the senior level
2. Selection to the previous year's World Championship team
3. Winning a medal at any Winter Olympic Games (excluding the team event)
4. Qualifying for the Junior Grand Prix of Figure Skating Final or Grand Prix of Figure Skating Final
5. Competing at three international competitions from an approved list

== Medalists ==
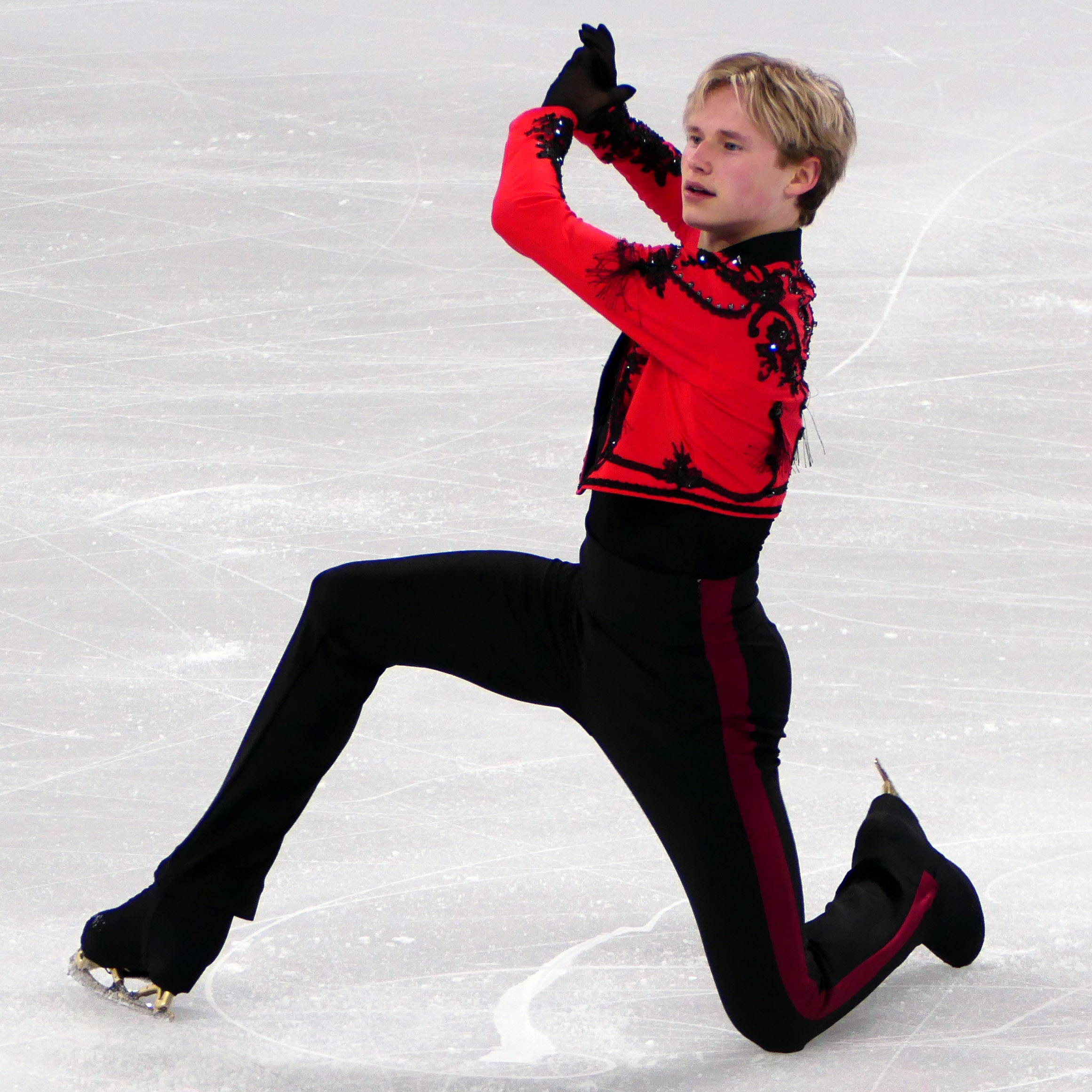
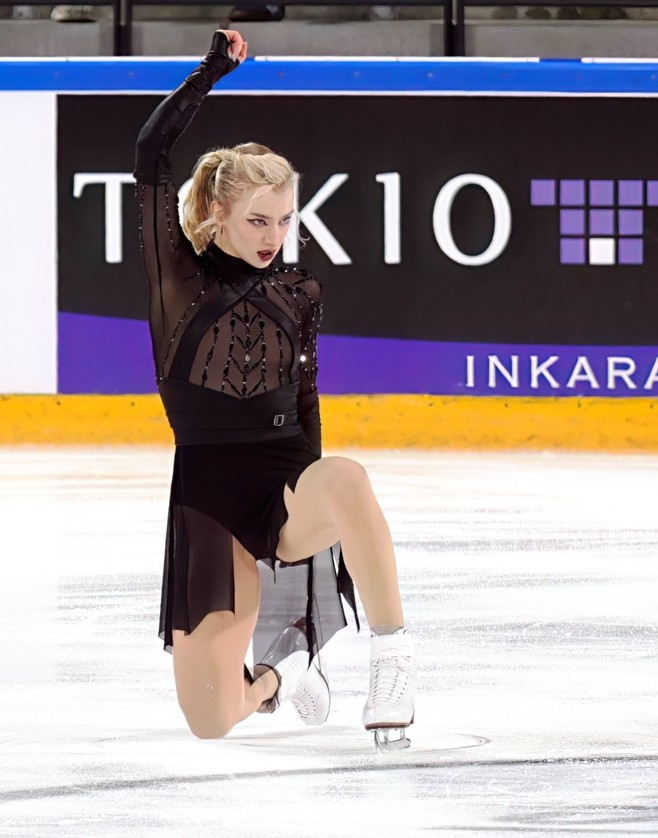
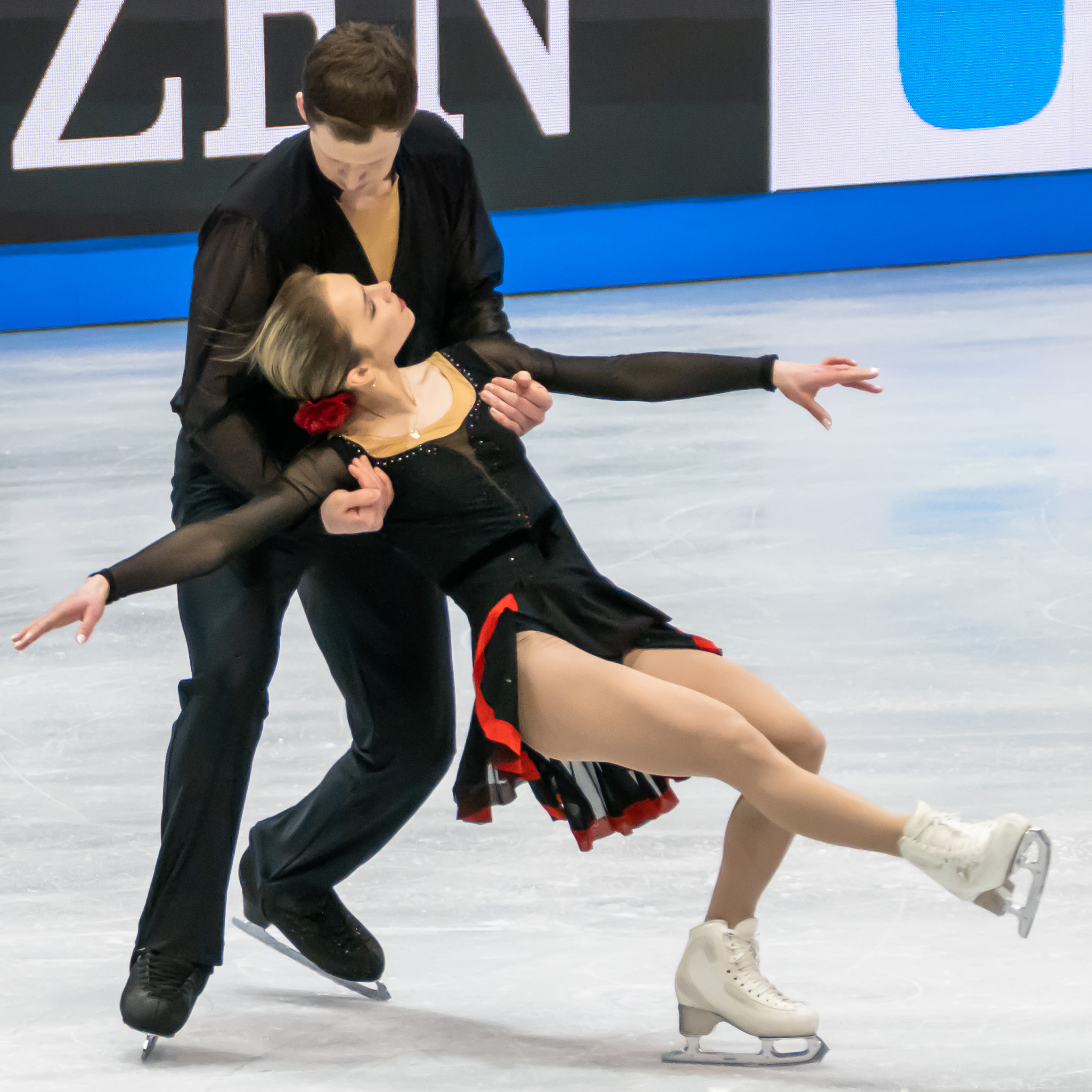
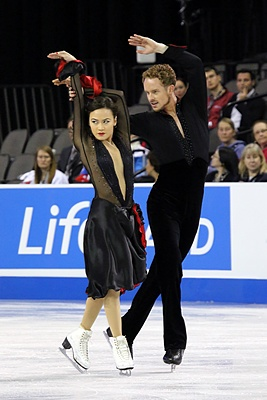
From left to right: The reigning U.S. figure skating champions: Ilia Malinin (men's singles); Amber Glenn (women's singles); Alisa Efimova and Misha Mitrofanov (pair skating); and Madison Chock and Evan Bates (ice dance)

=== Men's singles ===
Senior men's event medalists
Year	Location	Gold	Silver	Bronze	Pewter	Ref.
1914	New Haven	Norman Scott (Canada)	Edward Howland	Nathaniel Niles	No pewter medal awarded	
1915–17	No competitions due to World War I					
1918	New York City	Nathaniel Niles	Karl Engel	Edward Howland	No pewter medal awarded	
1919	No competition held					
1920	New York City	Sherwin Badger	Nathaniel Niles	Petros Wahlman	No pewter medals awarded	
1921	Philadelphia	Sherwin Badger	Nathaniel Niles	Edward Howland	No pewter medals awarded	
1922	Boston	Sherwin Badger	Nathaniel Niles	No other competitors		
1923	New Haven	Sherwin Badger	Chris Christenson	Julius Nelson	No pewter medals awarded	
1924	Philadelphia	Sherwin Badger	Nathaniel Niles	Chris Christenson	No pewter medals awarded	
1925	New York City	Nathaniel Niles	George Braakman	Carl Engel	No pewter medals awarded	
1926	Boston	Chris Christenson	Nathaniel Niles	Ferrier Martin	No pewter medals awarded	
1927	New York City	Nathaniel Niles	Roger Turner	George Braakman	No pewter medals awarded	
1928	New Haven	Roger Turner	Fredrick Goodridge	Walter Langer	No pewter medals awarded	
1929	New York City	Roger Turner	Fredrick Goodridge	J. Lester Madden	No pewter medals awarded	
1930	Providence	Roger Turner	J. Lester Madden	George Hill	No pewter medals awarded	
1931	Boston	Roger Turner	J. Lester Madden	George Hill	No pewter medals awarded	
1932	New York City	Roger Turner	J. Lester Madden	Gail Borden	No pewter medals awarded	
1933	New Haven	Roger Turner	J. Lester Madden	Robin Lee	No pewter medals awarded	
1934	Philadelphia	Roger Turner	Robin Lee	George Hill	No pewter medals awarded	
1935	New Haven	Robin Lee	Roger Turner	J. Lester Madden	No pewter medals awarded	
1936	New York City	Robin Lee	Erle Reiter	George Hill	No pewter medals awarded	
1937	Chicago	Robin Lee	Erle Reiter	William Nagle	No pewter medals awarded	
1938	Philadelphia	Robin Lee	Erle Reiter	Ollie Haupt Jr.	No pewter medals awarded	
1939	Saint Paul	Robin Lee	Ollie Haupt Jr.	Eugene Turner	No pewter medals awarded	
1940	Cleveland	Eugene Turner	Ollie Haupt Jr.	Skippy Baxter	No pewter medals awarded	
1941	Boston	Eugene Turner	Arthur Vaughn Jr.	William Nagle	No pewter medals awarded	
1942	Chicago	Bobby Specht	William Grimditch	Arthur Vaughn Jr.	No pewter medals awarded	
1943	New York City	Arthur Vaughn Jr.	Arthur Preusch II	William Nagle	No pewter medals awarded	
1944	Minneapolis	No senior men's competitions due to World War II				
1945	New York City	No senior men's competitions due to World War II				
1946	Chicago	Dick Button	James Lochead Jr.	John Tuckerman	No pewter medals awarded	
1947	Berkeley	Dick Button	John Lettengarver	James Grogan	No pewter medals awarded	
1948	Colorado Springs	Dick Button	James Grogan	John Lettengarver	No pewter medals awarded	
1949	Colorado Springs	Dick Button	James Grogan	Hayes Alan Jenkins	No pewter medals awarded	
1950	Washington, D.C.	Dick Button	Hayes Alan Jenkins	Richard Dwyer	No pewter medals awarded	
1951	Seattle	Dick Button	James Grogan	Hayes Alan Jenkins	No pewter medals awarded	
1952	Colorado Springs	Dick Button	James Grogan	Hayes Alan Jenkins	No pewter medals awarded	
1953	Hershey	Hayes Alan Jenkins	Ronald Robertson	Dudley Richards	No pewter medals awarded	
1954	Los Angeles	Hayes Alan Jenkins	David Jenkins	Ronald Robertson	No pewter medals awarded	
1955	Colorado Springs	Hayes Alan Jenkins	David Jenkins	Hugh Graham Jr.	No pewter medals awarded	
1956	Philadelphia	Hayes Alan Jenkins	Ronald Robertson	David Jenkins	No pewter medals awarded	
1957	Berkeley	David Jenkins	Tim Brown	Tom Moore	No pewter medals awarded	
1958	Minneapolis	David Jenkins	Tim Brown	Tom Moore	No pewter medals awarded	
1959	Rochester	David Jenkins	Tim Brown	Robert Lee Brewer	No pewter medals awarded	
1960	Seattle	David Jenkins	Tim Brown	Robert Lee Brewer	No pewter medals awarded	
1961	Colorado Springs	Bradley Lord	Gregory Kelley	Tim Brown	No pewter medals awarded	
1962	Boston	Monty Hoyt	Scott Allen	David Edwards	No pewter medals awarded	
1963	Long Beach	Thomas Litz	Scott Allen	Monty Hoyt	No pewter medals awarded	
1964	Cleveland	Scott Allen	Thomas Litz	Monty Hoyt	No pewter medals awarded	
1965	Lake Placid	Gary Visconti	Scott Allen	Tim Wood	No pewter medals awarded	
1966	Berkeley	Scott Allen	Gary Visconti	Billy Chapel	No pewter medals awarded	
1967	Omaha	Gary Visconti	Scott Allen	Tim Wood	No pewter medals awarded	
1968	Philadelphia	Tim Wood	Gary Visconti	John Misha Petkevich	No pewter medals awarded	
1969	Seattle	Tim Wood	John Misha Petkevich	Gary Visconti	No pewter medals awarded	
1970	Tulsa	Tim Wood	John Misha Petkevich	Kenneth Shelley	No pewter medals awarded	
1971	Buffalo	John Misha Petkevich	Kenneth Shelley	Gordon McKellen Jr.	No pewter medals awarded	
1972	Long Beach	Kenneth Shelley	John Misha Petkevich	Gordon McKellen Jr.	No pewter medals awarded	
1973	Minneapolis	Gordon McKellen Jr.	Robert Bradshaw	David Santee	No pewter medals awarded	
1974	Providence	Gordon McKellen Jr.	Terry Kubicka	Charles Tickner	No pewter medals awarded	
1975	Oakland	Gordon McKellen Jr.	Terry Kubicka	Charles Tickner	No pewter medals awarded	
1976	Colorado Springs	Terry Kubicka	David Santee	Scott Cramer	No pewter medals awarded	
1977	Hartford	Charles Tickner	Scott Cramer	David Santee	No pewter medals awarded	
1978	Portland	Charles Tickner	David Santee	Scott Hamilton	No pewter medals awarded	
1979	Cincinnati	Charles Tickner	Scott Cramer	David Santee	No pewter medals awarded	
1980	Atlanta	Charles Tickner	David Santee	Scott Hamilton	No pewter medals awarded	
1981	San Diego	Scott Hamilton	David Santee	Robert Wagenhoffer	No pewter medals awarded	
1982	Indianapolis	Scott Hamilton	Robert Wagenhoffer	David Santee	No pewter medals awarded	
1983	Pittsburgh	Scott Hamilton	Brian Boitano	Mark Cockerell	No pewter medals awarded	
1984	Salt Lake City	Scott Hamilton	Brian Boitano	Mark Cockerell	No pewter medals awarded	
1985	Kansas City	Brian Boitano	Mark Cockerell	Scott Williams	No pewter medals awarded	
1986	Uniondale	Brian Boitano	Scott Williams	Daniel Doran	No pewter medals awarded	
1987	Tacoma	Brian Boitano	Christopher Bowman	Scott Williams	No pewter medals awarded	
1988	Denver	Brian Boitano	Paul Wylie	Christopher Bowman	Daniel Doran	
1989	Baltimore	Christopher Bowman	Daniel Doran	Paul Wylie	Erik Larson	
1990	Salt Lake City	Todd Eldredge	Paul Wylie	Mark Mitchell	Erik Larson	
1991	Minneapolis	Todd Eldredge	Christopher Bowman	Paul Wylie	Mark Mitchell	
1992	Orlando	Christopher Bowman	Paul Wylie	Mark Mitchell	Scott Davis	
1993	Phoenix	Scott Davis	Mark Mitchell	Michael Chack	Aren Nielsen	
1994	Detroit	Scott Davis	Brian Boitano	Aren Nielsen	Todd Eldredge	
1995	Providence	Todd Eldredge	Scott Davis	Aren Nielsen	Damon Allen	
1996	San Jose	Rudy Galindo	Todd Eldredge	Daniel Hollander	Scott Davis	
1997	Nashville	Todd Eldredge	Michael Weiss	Daniel Hollander	Scott Davis	
1998	Philadelphia	Todd Eldredge	Michael Weiss	Scott Davis	Shepherd Clark	
1999	Salt Lake City	Michael Weiss	Trifun Zivanovic	Timothy Goebel	Matthew Savoie	
2000	Cleveland	Michael Weiss	Timothy Goebel	Trifun Zivanovic	Matthew Savoie	
2001	Boston	Timothy Goebel	Todd Eldredge	Matthew Savoie	Michael Weiss	
2002	Los Angeles	Todd Eldredge	Timothy Goebel	Michael Weiss	Matthew Savoie	
2003	Dallas	Michael Weiss	Timothy Goebel	Ryan Jahnke	Scott Smith	
2004	Atlanta	Johnny Weir	Michael Weiss	Matthew Savoie	Ryan Jahnke	
2005	Portland	Johnny Weir	Timothy Goebel	Evan Lysacek	Matthew Savoie	
2006	St. Louis	Johnny Weir	Evan Lysacek	Matthew Savoie	Michael Weiss	
2007	Spokane	Evan Lysacek	Ryan Bradley	Johnny Weir	Jeremy Abbott	
2008	Saint Paul	Evan Lysacek	Johnny Weir	Stephen Carriere	Jeremy Abbott	
2009	Cleveland	Jeremy Abbott	Brandon Mroz	Evan Lysacek	Ryan Bradley	
2010	Spokane	Jeremy Abbott	Evan Lysacek	Johnny Weir	Ryan Bradley	
2011	Greensboro	Ryan Bradley	Richard Dornbush	Ross Miner	Jeremy Abbott	
2012	San Jose	Jeremy Abbott	Adam Rippon	Ross Miner	Armin Mahbanoozadeh	
2013	Omaha	Max Aaron	Ross Miner	Jeremy Abbott	Joshua Farris	
2014	Boston	Jeremy Abbott	Jason Brown	Max Aaron	Joshua Farris	
2015	Greensboro	Jason Brown	Adam Rippon	Joshua Farris	Max Aaron	
2016	Saint Paul	Adam Rippon	Max Aaron	Nathan Chen	Grant Hochstein	
2017	Kansas City	Nathan Chen	Vincent Zhou	Jason Brown	Grant Hochstein	
2018	San Jose	Nathan Chen	Ross Miner	Vincent Zhou	Adam Rippon	
2019	Detroit	Nathan Chen	Vincent Zhou	Jason Brown	Tomoki Hiwatashi	
2020	Greensboro	Nathan Chen	Jason Brown	Tomoki Hiwatashi	Vincent Zhou	
2021	Las Vegas	Nathan Chen	Vincent Zhou	Jason Brown	Yaroslav Paniot	
2022	Nashville	Nathan Chen	Ilia Malinin	Vincent Zhou	Jason Brown	
2023	San Jose	Ilia Malinin	Jason Brown	Andrew Torgashev	Maxim Naumov	
2024	Columbus	Ilia Malinin	Jason Brown	Camden Pulkinen	Maxim Naumov	
2025	Wichita	Ilia Malinin	Andrew Torgashev	Camden Pulkinen	Maxim Naumov	
2026	St. Louis	Ilia Malinin	Andrew Torgashev	Maxim Naumov	Jacob Sanchez	

=== Women's singles ===
Senior women's event medalists
Year	Location	Gold	Silver	Bronze	Pewter	Ref.
1914	New Haven	Theresa Weld	Edith Rotch	No other competitors		
1915–17	No competitions due to World War I					
1918	New York City	Rosemary Beresford	Theresa Weld	No other competitors	No pewter medal awarded	
1919	No competition held					
1920	New York City	Theresa Weld-Blanchard	Lilian Cramer	Martha Brown	No pewter medal awarded	
1921	Philadelphia	Theresa Weld-Blanchard	Lilian Cramer	No other competitors		
1922	Boston	Theresa Weld-Blanchard	Beatrix Loughran	No other competitors		
1923	New Haven	Theresa Weld-Blanchard	Beatrix Loughran	Lilian Cramer	No pewter medal awarded	
1924	Philadelphia	Theresa Weld-Blanchard	Rosalie Knapp	No other competitors		
1925	New York City	Beatrix Loughran	Theresa Weld-Blanchard	Rosalie Knapp	No pewter medals awarded	
1926	Boston	Beatrix Loughran	Theresa Weld-Blanchard	Maribel Vinson	No pewter medals awarded	
1927	New York City	Beatrix Loughran	Maribel Vinson	Theresa Weld-Blanchard	No pewter medals awarded	
1928	New Haven	Maribel Vinson	Suzanne Davis	No other competitors		
1929	New York City	Maribel Vinson	Edith Secord	Suzanne Davis	No pewter medals awarded	
1930	Providence	Maribel Vinson	Edith Secord	Suzanne Davis	No pewter medals awarded	
1931	Boston	Maribel Vinson	Edith Secord	Hulda Berger	No pewter medals awarded	
1932	New York City	Maribel Vinson	Margaret Bennett	Louise Weigel	No pewter medals awarded	
1933	New Haven	Maribel Vinson	Suzanne Davis	Louise Weigel	No pewter medals awarded	
1934	Philadelphia	Suzanne Davis	Louise Weigel	Estelle Weigel	No pewter medals awarded	
1935	New Haven	Maribel Vinson	Suzanne Davis	Louise Weigel	No pewter medals awarded	
1936	New York City	Maribel Vinson	Louise Weigel	Audrey Peppe	No pewter medals awarded	
1937	Chicago	Maribel Vinson	Polly Blodgett	Katherine Durbrow	No pewter medals awarded	
1938	Philadelphia	Joan Tozzer	Audrey Peppe	Polly Blodgett	No pewter medals awarded	
1939	Saint Paul	Joan Tozzer	Audrey Peppe	Charlotte Walther	No pewter medals awarded	
1940	Cleveland	Joan Tozzer	Hedy Stenuf	Jane Vaughn	No pewter medals awarded	
1941	Boston	Jane Vaughn	Gretchen Merrill	Charlotte Walther	No pewter medals awarded	
1942	Chicago	Jane Vaughn	Gretchen Merrill	Phebe Tucker	No pewter medals awarded	
1943	New York City	Gretchen Merrill	Dorothy Goos	Janette Ahrens	No pewter medals awarded	
1944	Minneapolis	Gretchen Merrill	Dorothy Goos	Ramona Allen	No pewter medals awarded	
1945	New York City	Gretchen Merrill	Janette Ahrens	Madelon Olson	No pewter medals awarded	
1946	Chicago	Gretchen Merrill	Janette Ahrens	Madelon Olson	No pewter medals awarded	
1947	Berkeley	Gretchen Merrill	Janette Ahrens	Eileen Seigh	No pewter medals awarded	
1948	Colorado Springs	Gretchen Merrill	Yvonne Sherman	Helen Uhl	No pewter medals awarded	
1949	Colorado Springs	Yvonne Sherman	Gretchen Merrill	Virginia Baxter	No pewter medals awarded	
1950	Washington, D.C.	Yvonne Sherman	Sonya Klopfer	Virginia Baxter	No pewter medals awarded	
1951	Seattle	Sonya Klopfer	Tenley Albright	Virginia Baxter	No pewter medals awarded	
1952	Colorado Springs	Tenley Albright	Frances Dorsey	Helen Geekie	No pewter medals awarded	
1953	Hershey	Tenley Albright	Carol Heiss	Margaret Graham	No pewter medals awarded	
1954	Los Angeles	Tenley Albright	Carol Heiss	Frances Dorsey	No pewter medals awarded	
1955	Colorado Springs	Tenley Albright	Carol Heiss	Catherine Machado	No pewter medals awarded	
1956	Philadelphia	Tenley Albright	Carol Heiss	Catherine Machado	No pewter medals awarded	
1957	Berkeley	Carol Heiss	Joan Schenke	Claralyn Lewis	No pewter medals awarded	
1958	Minneapolis	Carol Heiss	Carol Wanek	Lynn Finnegan	No pewter medals awarded	
1959	Rochester	Carol Heiss	Nancy Heiss	Barbara Ann Roles	No pewter medals awarded	
1960	Seattle	Carol Heiss	Barbara Ann Roles	Laurence Owen	No pewter medals awarded	
1961	Colorado Springs	Laurence Owen	Stephanie Westerfeld	Rhode Lee Michelson	No pewter medals awarded	
1962	Boston	Barbara Ann Roles	Lorraine Hanlon	Victoria Fisher	No pewter medals awarded	
1963	Long Beach	Lorraine Hanlon	Christine Haigler	Karen Howland	No pewter medals awarded	
1964	Cleveland	Peggy Fleming	Albertina Noyes	Christine Haigler	No pewter medals awarded	
1965	Lake Placid	Peggy Fleming	Christine Haigler	Albertina Noyes	No pewter medals awarded	
1966	Berkeley	Peggy Fleming	Albertina Noyes	Pamela Schneider	No pewter medals awarded	
1967	Omaha	Peggy Fleming	Albertina Noyes	Jennie Walsh	No pewter medals awarded	
1968	Philadelphia	Peggy Fleming	Albertina Noyes	Janet Lynn	No pewter medals awarded	
1969	Seattle	Janet Lynn	Julie Lynn Holmes	Albertina Noyes	No pewter medals awarded	
1970	Tulsa	Janet Lynn	Julie Lynn Holmes	Dawn Glab	No pewter medals awarded	
1971	Buffalo	Janet Lynn	Julie Lynn Holmes	Suna Murray	No pewter medals awarded	
1972	Long Beach	Janet Lynn	Julie Lynn Holmes	Suna Murray	No pewter medals awarded	
1973	Minneapolis	Janet Lynn	Dorothy Hamill	Juli McKinstry	No pewter medals awarded	
1974	Providence	Dorothy Hamill	Juli McKinstry	Kath Malmberg	No pewter medals awarded	
1975	Oakland	Dorothy Hamill	Wendy Burge	Kath Malmberg	No pewter medals awarded	
1976	Colorado Springs	Dorothy Hamill	Linda Fratianne	Wendy Burge	No pewter medals awarded	
1977	Hartford	Linda Fratianne	Barbie Smith	Wendy Burge	No pewter medals awarded	
1978	Portland	Linda Fratianne	Lisa-Marie Allen	Priscilla Hill	No pewter medals awarded	
1979	Cincinnati	Linda Fratianne	Lisa-Marie Allen	Carrie Rugh	No pewter medals awarded	
1980	Atlanta	Linda Fratianne	Lisa-Marie Allen	Sandy Lenz	No pewter medals awarded	
1981	San Diego	Elaine Zayak	Priscilla Hill	Lisa-Marie Allen	No pewter medals awarded	
1982	Indianapolis	Rosalynn Sumners	Vikki de Vries	Elaine Zayak	No pewter medals awarded	
1983	Pittsburgh	Rosalynn Sumners	Elaine Zayak	Tiffany Chin	No pewter medals awarded	
1984	Salt Lake City	Rosalynn Sumners	Tiffany Chin	Elaine Zayak	No pewter medals awarded	
1985	Kansas City	Tiffany Chin	Debi Thomas	Caryn Kadavy	No pewter medals awarded	
1986	Uniondale	Debi Thomas	Caryn Kadavy	Tiffany Chin	No pewter medals awarded	
1987	Tacoma	Jill Trenary	Debi Thomas	Caryn Kadavy	No pewter medals awarded	
1988	Denver	Debi Thomas	Jill Trenary	Caryn Kadavy	Jeri Campbell	
1989	Baltimore	Jill Trenary	Kristi Yamaguchi	Tonya Harding	Holly Cook	
1990	Salt Lake City	Jill Trenary	Kristi Yamaguchi	Holly Cook	Nancy Kerrigan	
1991	Minneapolis	Tonya Harding	Kristi Yamaguchi	Nancy Kerrigan	Tonia Kwiatkowski	
1992	Orlando	Kristi Yamaguchi	Nancy Kerrigan	Tonya Harding	Lisa Ervin	
1993	Phoenix	Nancy Kerrigan	Lisa Ervin	Tonia Kwiatkowski	Tonya Harding	
1994	Detroit	No champion (Note: In June 1994, U.S. Figure Skating voted to strip Tonya Harding of her 1994 title. However, the competition results were not changed and the title was left vacant.)	Michelle Kwan	Nicole Bobek	Elaine Zayak	
1995	Providence	Nicole Bobek	Michelle Kwan	Tonia Kwiatkowski	Kyoko Ina	
1996	San Jose	Michelle Kwan	Tonia Kwiatkowski	Tara Lipinski	Sydne Vogel	
1997	Nashville	Tara Lipinski	Michelle Kwan	Nicole Bobek	Angela Nikodinov	
1998	Philadelphia	Michelle Kwan	Tara Lipinski	Nicole Bobek	Tonia Kwiatkowski	
1999	Salt Lake City	Michelle Kwan	Naomi Nari Nam	Angela Nikodinov	Sarah Hughes	
2000	Cleveland	Michelle Kwan	Sasha Cohen	Sarah Hughes	Angela Nikodinov	
2001	Boston	Michelle Kwan	Sarah Hughes	Angela Nikodinov	Jennifer Kirk	
2002	Los Angeles	Michelle Kwan	Sasha Cohen	Sarah Hughes	Angela Nikodinov	
2003	Dallas	Michelle Kwan	Sarah Hughes	Sasha Cohen	Ann Patrice McDonough	
2004	Atlanta	Michelle Kwan	Sasha Cohen	Jennifer Kirk	Amber Corwin	
2005	Portland	Michelle Kwan	Sasha Cohen	Kimmie Meissner	Jennifer Kirk	
2006	St. Louis	Sasha Cohen	Kimmie Meissner	Emily Hughes	Katy Taylor	
2007	Spokane	Kimmie Meissner	Emily Hughes	Alissa Czisny	Beatrisa Liang	
2008	Saint Paul	Mirai Nagasu	Rachael Flatt	Ashley Wagner	Caroline Zhang	
2009	Cleveland	Alissa Czisny	Rachael Flatt	Caroline Zhang	Ashley Wagner	
2010	Spokane	Rachael Flatt	Mirai Nagasu	Ashley Wagner	Sasha Cohen	
2011	Greensboro	Alissa Czisny	Rachael Flatt	Mirai Nagasu	Agnes Zawadzki	
2012	San Jose	Ashley Wagner	Alissa Czisny	Agnes Zawadzki	Caroline Zhang	
2013	Omaha	Ashley Wagner	Gracie Gold	Agnes Zawadzki	Courtney Hicks	
2014	Boston	Gracie Gold	Polina Edmunds	Mirai Nagasu	Ashley Wagner	
2015	Greensboro	Ashley Wagner	Gracie Gold	Karen Chen	Polina Edmunds	
2016	Saint Paul	Gracie Gold	Polina Edmunds	Ashley Wagner	Mirai Nagasu	
2017	Kansas City	Karen Chen	Ashley Wagner	Mariah Bell	Mirai Nagasu	
2018	San Jose	Bradie Tennell	Mirai Nagasu	Karen Chen	Ashley Wagner	
2019	Detroit	Alysa Liu	Bradie Tennell	Mariah Bell	Hanna Harrell	
2020	Greensboro	Alysa Liu	Mariah Bell	Bradie Tennell	Karen Chen	
2021	Las Vegas	Bradie Tennell	Amber Glenn	Karen Chen	Alysa Liu	
2022	Nashville	Mariah Bell	Karen Chen	Isabeau Levito	Gabriella Izzo	
2023	San Jose	Isabeau Levito	Bradie Tennell	Amber Glenn	Starr Andrews	
2024	Columbus	Amber Glenn	Josephine Lee	Isabeau Levito	Sarah Everhardt	
2025	Wichita	Amber Glenn	Alysa Liu	Sarah Everhardt	Bradie Tennell	
2026	St. Louis	Amber Glenn	Alysa Liu	Isabeau Levito	Bradie Tennell	

=== Pairs ===
Senior pairs' event medalists
Year	Location	Gold	Silver	Bronze	Pewter	Ref.
1914	New Haven	(Canada); Jeanne Chevalier; Norman Scott; (Canada)	Theresa Weld; Nathaniel Niles	Eleanor Crocker; Edward Howland	No pewter medals awarded	
1915–17	No competitions due to World War I					
1918	New York City	Theresa Weld; Nathaniel Niles	Clara Frothingham; Sherwin Badger	No other competitors		
1919	No competition held					
1920	New York City	Theresa Weld-Blanchard; Nathaniel Niles	Edith Rotch; Sherwin Badger	No other competitors		
1921	Philadelphia	Theresa Weld-Blanchard; Nathaniel Niles	Mrs. Edward Howland; Edward Howland	Clara Frothingham; Charles Rotch	No pewter medals awarded	
1922	Boston	Theresa Weld-Blanchard; Nathaniel Niles	Mrs. Edward Howland; Edward Howland	Edith Rotch; Francis Munroe	No pewter medals awarded	
1923	New Haven	Theresa Weld-Blanchard; Nathaniel Niles	No other competitors			
1924	Philadelphia	Theresa Weld-Blanchard; Nathaniel Niles	Grace Munstock; Joel Liberman	No other competitors		
1925	New York City	Theresa Weld-Blanchard; Nathaniel Niles	Ada Bauman; George Braakman	Grace Munstock; Joel Liberman	No pewter medals awarded	
1926	Boston	Theresa Weld-Blanchard; Nathaniel Niles	Sydney Goode; James Greene	Grace Munstock; Joel Liberman	No pewter medals awarded	
1927	New York City	Theresa Weld-Blanchard; Nathaniel Niles	Beatrix Loughran; Raymond Harvey	Ada Bauman; George Braakman	No pewter medals awarded	
1928	New Haven	Maribel Vinson; Thornton Coolidge	Theresa Weld-Blanchard; Nathaniel Niles	Ada Bauman; George Braakman	No pewter medals awarded	
1929	New York City	Maribel Vinson; Thornton Coolidge	Theresa Weld-Blanchard; Nathaniel Niles	Edith Secord; Joseph Savage	No pewter medals awarded	
1930	Providence	Beatrix Loughran; Sherwin Badger	Maribel Vinson; George Hill	Edith Secord; Joseph Savage	No pewter medals awarded	
1931	Boston	Beatrix Loughran; Sherwin Badger	Maribel Vinson; George Hill	Grace Madden; J. Lester Madden	No pewter medals awarded	
1932	New York City	Beatrix Loughran; Sherwin Badger	Maribel Vinson; George Hill	Gertrude Meredith; Joseph Savage	No pewter medals awarded	
1933	New Haven	Maribel Vinson; George Hill	Grace Madden; J. Lester Madden	Gertrude Meredith; Joseph Savage	No pewter medals awarded	
1934	Philadelphia	Grace Madden; J. Lester Madden	Eva Schwerdt; William Bruns Jr.	No other competitors		
1935	New Haven	Maribel Vinson; George Hill	Grace Madden; J. Lester Madden	Eva Schwerdt; William Bruns Jr.	No pewter medals awarded	
1936	New York City	Maribel Vinson; George Hill	Polly Blodgett; Roger Turner	Marjorie Parker; Howard Meredith	No pewter medals awarded	
1937	Chicago	Maribel Vinson; George Hill	Grace Madden; J. Lester Madden	Joan Tozzer; Bernard Fox	No pewter medals awarded	
1938	Philadelphia	Joan Tozzer; Bernard Fox	Grace Madden; J. Lester Madden	Ardelle Sanderson; Roland Janson	No pewter medals awarded	
1939	Saint Paul	Joan Tozzer; Bernard Fox	Annah Hall; William Penn-Gaskell Hall III	Eva Schwerdt Bruns; William Bruns Jr.	No pewter medals awarded	
1940	Cleveland	Joan Tozzer; Bernard Fox	Hedy Stenuf; Skippy Baxter	Eva Schwerdt Bruns; William Bruns Jr.	No pewter medals awarded	
1941	Boston	Donna Atwood; Eugene Turner	Patricia Vaeth; Jack Might	Joan Mitchell; Bobby Specht	No pewter medals awarded	
1942	Chicago	Doris Schubach; Walter Noffke	Janette Ahrens; Robert Uppgren	Margaret Field; Jack Might	No pewter medals awarded	
1943	New York City	Doris Schubach; Walter Noffke	Janette Ahrens; Robert Uppgren	Dorothy Goos; Edward LeMaire	No pewter medals awarded	
1944	Minneapolis	Doris Schubach; Walter Noffke	Janette Ahrens; Arthur Preusch II	Marcella May; James Lochead Jr.	No pewter medals awarded	
1945	New York City	Donna Pospisil; Jean-Pierre Brunet	Ann McGean; Michael McGean	Marcella May; James Lochead Jr.	No pewter medals awarded	
1946	Chicago	Donna Pospisil; Jean-Pierre Brunet	Karol Kennedy; Peter Kennedy	Patty Sonnekson; Charles Brinkman	No pewter medals awarded	
1947	Berkeley	Yvonne Sherman; Robert Swenning	Karol Kennedy; Peter Kennedy	Carolyn Welch; Charles Brinkman	No pewter medals awarded	
1948	Colorado Springs	Karol Kennedy; Peter Kennedy	Yvonne Sherman; Robert Swenning	Harriet Sutton; Lyman Wakefield Jr.	No pewter medals awarded	
1949	Colorado Springs	Karol Kennedy; Peter Kennedy	Irene Maguire; Walter Muehlbronner	Anne Davies; Carleton Hoffner Jr.	No pewter medals awarded	
1950	Washington, D.C.	Karol Kennedy; Peter Kennedy	Irene Maguire; Walter Muehlbronner	Anne Davies; Carleton Hoffner Jr.	No pewter medals awarded	
1951	Seattle	Karol Kennedy; Peter Kennedy	Janet Gerhauser; John Nightingale	Anne Holt; Austin Holt	No pewter medals awarded	
1952	Colorado Springs	Karol Kennedy; Peter Kennedy	Janet Gerhauser; John Nightingale	No other competitors		
1953	Hershey	Carole Ann Ormaca; Robin Greiner	Margaret Graham; Hugh Graham Jr.	Kay Servatius; Sully Kothmann	No pewter medals awarded	
1954	Los Angeles	Carole Ann Ormaca; Robin Greiner	Margaret Graham; Hugh Graham Jr.	Lucille Ash; Sully Kothmann	No pewter medals awarded	
1955	Colorado Springs	Carole Ann Ormaca; Robin Greiner	Lucille Ash; Sully Kothmann	Agnes Tyson; Robert Swenning	No pewter medals awarded	
1956	Philadelphia	Carole Ann Ormaca; Robin Greiner	Lucille Ash; Sully Kothmann	Maribel Owen; Charles Foster	No pewter medals awarded	
1957	Berkeley	Nancy Ludington; Ronald Ludington	Mary Jane Watson; John Jarmon	Anita Tefkin; James Barlow	No pewter medals awarded	
1958	Minneapolis	Nancy Ludington; Ronald Ludington	Sheila Wells; Robin Greiner	Maribel Owen; Dudley Richards	No pewter medals awarded	
1959	Rochester	Nancy Ludington; Ronald Ludington	Gayle Freed; Karl Freed	Maribel Owen; Dudley Richards	No pewter medals awarded	
1960	Seattle	Nancy Ludington; Ronald Ludington	Maribel Owen; Dudley Richards	Ila Ray Hadley; Ray Hadley Jr.	No pewter medals awarded	
1961	Colorado Springs	Maribel Owen; Dudley Richards	Ila Ray Hadley; Ray Hadley Jr.	Laurie Hickox; William Hickox	No pewter medals awarded	
1962	Boston	Dorothyann Nelson; Pieter Kollen	Judianne Fotheringill; Jerry Fotheringill	Vivian Joseph; Ronald Joseph	No pewter medals awarded	
1963	Long Beach	Judianne Fotheringill; Jerry Fotheringill	Vivian Joseph; Ronald Joseph	Patti Gustafson; Pieter Kollen	No pewter medals awarded	
1964	Cleveland	Judianne Fotheringill; Jerry Fotheringill	Vivian Joseph; Ronald Joseph	Cynthia Kauffman; Ronald Kauffman	No pewter medals awarded	
1965	Lake Placid	Vivian Joseph; Ronald Joseph	Cynthia Kauffman; Ronald Kauffman	Joanne Heckart; Gary Clark	No pewter medals awarded	
1966	Berkeley	Cynthia Kauffman; Ronald Kauffman	Susan Berens; Roy Wagelein	Page Paulsen; Larry Dusich	No pewter medals awarded	
1967	Omaha	Cynthia Kauffman; Ronald Kauffman	Susan Berens; Roy Wagelein	Betty Lewis; Richard Gilbert	No pewter medals awarded	
1968	Philadelphia	Cynthia Kauffman; Ronald Kauffman	Sandi Sweitzer; Roy Wagelein	JoJo Starbuck; Kenneth Shelley	No pewter medals awarded	
1969	Seattle	Cynthia Kauffman; Ronald Kauffman	JoJo Starbuck; Kenneth Shelley	Melissa Militano; Mark Militano	No pewter medals awarded	
1970	Tulsa	JoJo Starbuck; Kenneth Shelley	Melissa Militano; Mark Militano	Sheri Thrapp; Larry Duisch	No pewter medals awarded	
1971	Buffalo	JoJo Starbuck; Kenneth Shelley	Melissa Militano; Mark Militano	Barbara Brown; Doug Berndt	No pewter medals awarded	
1972	Long Beach	JoJo Starbuck; Kenneth Shelley	Melissa Militano; Mark Militano	Barbara Brown; Doug Berndt	No pewter medals awarded	
1973	Minneapolis	Melissa Militano; Mark Militano	Gale Fuhrman; Joel Fuhrman	Emily Benenson; Johnny Johns	No pewter medals awarded	
1974	Providence	Melissa Militano; Johnny Johns	Tai Babilonia; Randy Gardner	Erika Susman; Thomas Huff	No pewter medals awarded	
1975	Oakland	Melissa Militano; Johnny Johns	Tai Babilonia; Randy Gardner	Emily Benenson; Jack Courtney	No pewter medals awarded	
1976	Colorado Springs	Tai Babilonia; Randy Gardner	Alice Cook; William Fauver	Emily Benenson; Jack Courtney	No pewter medals awarded	
1977	Hartford	Tai Babilonia; Randy Gardner	Gail Hamula; Frank Sweiding	Sheryl Franks; Michael Botticelli	No pewter medals awarded	
1978	Portland	Tai Babilonia; Randy Gardner	Gail Hamula; Frank Sweiding	Sheryl Franks; Michael Botticelli	No pewter medals awarded	
1979	Cincinnati	Tai Babilonia; Randy Gardner	Vicki Heasley; Robert Wagenhoffer	Sheryl Franks; Michael Botticelli	No pewter medals awarded	
1980	Atlanta	Tai Babilonia; Randy Gardner	Caitlin Carruthers; Peter Carruthers	Sheryl Franks; Michael Botticelli	No pewter medals awarded	
1981	San Diego	Caitlin Carruthers; Peter Carruthers	Lea Ann Miller; William Fauver	Beth Flora; Ken Flora	No pewter medals awarded	
1982	Indianapolis	Caitlin Carruthers; Peter Carruthers	Lea Ann Miller; William Fauver	Maria DiDomenico; Burt Lancon	No pewter medals awarded	
1983	Pittsburgh	Caitlin Carruthers; Peter Carruthers	Lea Ann Miller; William Fauver	Jill Watson; Burt Lancon	No pewter medals awarded	
1984	Salt Lake City	Caitlin Carruthers; Peter Carruthers	Lea Ann Miller; William Fauver	Jill Watson; Burt Lancon	No pewter medals awarded	
1985	Kansas City	Jill Watson; Peter Oppegard	Natalie Seybold; Wayne Seybold	Gillian Wachsman; Todd Waggoner	No pewter medals awarded	
1986	Uniondale	Gillian Wachsman; Todd Waggoner	Jill Watson; Peter Oppegard	Natalie Seybold; Wayne Seybold	No pewter medals awarded	
1987	Tacoma	Jill Watson; Peter Oppegard	Gillian Wachsman; Todd Waggoner	Katy Keeley; Joseph Mero	No pewter medals awarded	
1988	Denver	Jill Watson; Peter Oppegard	Gillian Wachsman; Todd Waggoner	Natalie Seybold; Wayne Seybold	Katy Keeley; Joseph Mero	
1989	Baltimore	Kristi Yamaguchi; Rudy Galindo	Natalie Seybold; Wayne Seybold	Katy Keeley; Joseph Mero	Sharon Carz; Doug Williams	
1990	Salt Lake City	Kristi Yamaguchi; Rudy Galindo	Natasha Kuchiki; Todd Sand	Sharon Carz; Doug Williams	Calla Urbanski; Mark Naylor	
1991	Minneapolis	Natasha Kuchiki; Todd Sand	Calla Urbanski; Rocky Marval	Jenni Meno; Scott Wendland	Sharon Carz; Doug Williams	
1992	Orlando	Calla Urbanski; Rocky Marval	Jenni Meno; Scott Wendland	Natasha Kuchiki; Todd Sand	Karen Courtland; Todd Reynolds	
1993	Phoenix	Calla Urbanski; Rocky Marval	Jenni Meno; Scott Wendland	Karen Courtland; Todd Reynolds	Katie Wood; Joel McKeever	
1994	Detroit	Jenni Meno; Todd Sand	Kyoko Ina; Jason Dungjen	Karen Courtland; Todd Reynolds	Natasha Kuchiki; Rocky Marval	
1995	Providence	Jenni Meno; Todd Sand	Kyoko Ina; Jason Dungjen	Stephanie Stiegler; Lance Travis	Shelby Lyons; Brian Wells	
1996	San Jose	Jenni Meno; Todd Sand	Kyoko Ina; Jason Dungjen	Shelby Lyons; Brian Wells	Stephanie Stiegler; John Zimmerman	
1997	Nashville	Kyoko Ina; Jason Dungjen	Jenni Meno; Todd Sand	Stephanie Stiegler; John Zimmerman	Shelby Lyons; Brian Wells	
1998	Philadelphia	Kyoko Ina; Jason Dungjen	Shelby Lyons; Brian Wells	Danielle Hartsell; Steve Hartsell	Tiffany Stiegler; Johnnie Stiegler	
1999	Salt Lake City	Danielle Hartsell; Steve Hartsell	Kyoko Ina; John Zimmerman	Laura Lynn Handy; J. Paul Binnebose	Tiffany Stiegler; Johnnie Stiegler	
2000	Cleveland	Kyoko Ina; John Zimmerman	Tiffany Scott; Philip Dulebohn	Larisa Spielberg; Craig Joeright	Amanda Magarian; Jered Guzman	
2001	Boston	Kyoko Ina; John Zimmerman	Tiffany Scott; Philip Dulebohn	Danielle Hartsell; Steve Hartsell	Stephanie Kalesavich; Aaron Parchem	
2002	Los Angeles	Kyoko Ina; John Zimmerman	Tiffany Scott; Philip Dulebohn	Stephanie Kalesavich; Aaron Parchem	Rena Inoue; John Baldwin Jr.	
2003	Dallas	Tiffany Scott; Philip Dulebohn	Katie Orscher; Garrett Lucash	Rena Inoue; John Baldwin Jr.	Larisa Spielberg; Craig Joeright	
2004	Atlanta	Rena Inoue; John Baldwin Jr.	Katie Orscher; Garrett Lucash	Tiffany Scott; Philip Dulebohn	Jennifer Don; Jonathon Hunt	
2005	Portland	Katie Orscher; Garrett Lucash	Rena Inoue; John Baldwin Jr.	Marcy Hinzmann; Aaron Parchem	Tiffany Scott; Philip Dulebohn	
2006	St. Louis	Rena Inoue; John Baldwin Jr.	Marcy Hinzmann; Aaron Parchem	Katie Orscher; Garrett Lucash	Tiffany Scott; Rusty Fein	
2007	Spokane	Brooke Castile; Benjamin Okolski	Rena Inoue; John Baldwin Jr.	Naomi Nari Nam; Themistocles Leftheris	Amanda Evora; Mark Ladwig	
2008	Saint Paul	Keauna McLaughlin; Rockne Brubaker	Rena Inoue; John Baldwin Jr.	Brooke Castile; Benjamin Okolski	Tiffany Vise; Derek Trent	
2009	Cleveland	Keauna McLaughlin; Rockne Brubaker	Caydee Denney; Jeremy Barrett	Rena Inoue; John Baldwin Jr.	Amanda Evora; Mark Ladwig	
2010	Spokane	Caydee Denney; Jeremy Barrett	Amanda Evora; Mark Ladwig	Rena Inoue; John Baldwin Jr.	Brooke Castile; Benjamin Okolski	
2011	Greensboro	Caitlin Yankowskas; John Coughlin	Amanda Evora; Mark Ladwig	Caydee Denney; Jeremy Barrett	Mary Beth Marley; Rockne Brubaker	
2012	San Jose	Caydee Denney; John Coughlin	Mary Beth Marley; Rockne Brubaker	Amanda Evora; Mark Ladwig	Gretchen Donlan; Andrew Speroff	
2013	Omaha	Marissa Castelli; Simon Shnapir	Alexa Scimeca; Chris Knierim	Felicia Zhang; Nathan Bartholomay	Lindsay Davis; Mark Ladwig	
2014	Boston	Marissa Castelli; Simon Shnapir	Felicia Zhang; Nathan Bartholomay	Caydee Denney; John Coughlin	Alexa Scimeca; Chris Knierim	
2015	Greensboro	Alexa Scimeca; Chris Knierim	Haven Denney; Brandon Frazier	Tarah Kayne; Daniel O'Shea	Madeline Aaron; Max Settlage	
2016	Saint Paul	Tarah Kayne; Daniel O'Shea	Alexa Scimeca; Chris Knierim	Marissa Castelli; Mervin Tran	Madeline Aaron; Max Settlage	
2017	Kansas City	Haven Denney; Brandon Frazier	Marissa Castelli; Mervin Tran	Ashley Cain; Timothy LeDuc	Deanna Stellato; Nathan Bartholomay	
2018	San Jose	Alexa Scimeca Knierim; Chris Knierim	Tarah Kayne; Daniel O'Shea	Deanna Stellato; Nathan Bartholomay	Ashley Cain; Timothy LeDuc	
2019	Detroit	Ashley Cain; Timothy LeDuc	Haven Denney; Brandon Frazier	Deanna Stellato; Nathan Bartholomay	Tarah Kayne; Daniel O'Shea	
2020	Greensboro	Alexa Scimeca Knierim; Chris Knierim	Jessica Calalang; Brian Johnson	Tarah Kayne; Daniel O'Shea	Ashley Cain; Timothy LeDuc	
2021	Las Vegas	Alexa Knierim; Brandon Frazier	Jessica Calalang; Brian Johnson	Ashley Cain; Timothy LeDuc	Audrey Lu; Misha Mitrofanov	
2022	Nashville	Ashley Cain-Gribble; Timothy LeDuc	Jessica Calalang; Brian Johnson	Audrey Lu; Misha Mitrofanov	Emily Chan; Spencer Akira Howe	
2023	San Jose	Alexa Knierim; Brandon Frazier	Emily Chan; Spencer Akira Howe	Ellie Kam; Daniel O'Shea	Sonia Baram; Daniel Tioumentsev	
2024	Columbus	Ellie Kam; Daniel O'Shea	Alisa Efimova; Misha Mitrofanov	Valentina Plazas; Maximiliano Fernandez	Chelsea Liu; Balázs Nagy	
2025	Wichita	Alisa Efimova; Misha Mitrofanov	Katie McBeath; Daniil Parkman	Ellie Kam; Daniel O'Shea	Emily Chan; Spencer Akira Howe	
2026	St. Louis	Alisa Efimova; Misha Mitrofanov	Ellie Kam; Daniel O'Shea	Katie McBeath; Daniil Parkman	Emily Chan; Spencer Akira Howe	

=== Ice dance ===
Senior ice dance event medalists
Year	Location	Gold	Silver	Bronze	Pewter	Ref.
1936	New York City	Marjorie Parker; Joseph Savage	Nettie Prantell; Harold Hartshorne	Clara Frothingham; Ashton Parmeter	No pewter medals awarded	
1937	Chicago	Nettie Prantell; Harold Hartshorne	Marjorie Parker; Joseph Savage	Ardelle Kloss; Roland Janson	No pewter medals awarded	
1938	Philadelphia	Nettie Prantell; Harold Hartshorne	Katherine Durbrow; Joseph Savage	Louise Weigel Atwell; Otto Dallmayr	No pewter medals awarded	
1939	Saint Paul	Sandy MacDonald; Harold Hartshorne	Nettie Prantell; Joseph Savage	Marjorie Parker; George Boltres	No pewter medals awarded	
1940	Cleveland	Sandy MacDonald; Harold Hartshorne	Nettie Prantell; George Boltres	Vernafay Thysell; Paul Harrington	No pewter medals awarded	
1941	Boston	Sandy MacDonald; Harold Hartshorne	Elizabeth Kennedy; Eugene Turner	Edith Whetstone; Alfred Richards Jr.	No pewter medals awarded	
1942	Chicago	Edith Whetstone; Alfred Richards Jr.	Sandy MacDonald; Harold Hartshorne	Ramona Allen; Herman Torrano	No pewter medals awarded	
1943	New York City	Marcella May; James Lochead Jr.	Marjorie Parker Smith; Joseph Savage	Nettie Prantel Meier; Harold Hartshorne	No pewter medals awarded	
1944	Minneapolis	Marcella May; James Lochead Jr.	Kathe Mehl; Harold Hartshorne	Mary Anderson; Jack Anderson	No pewter medals awarded	
1945	New York City	Kathe Mehl Williams; Robert Swenning	Marcella May Willis; James Lochead Jr.	Anne Davies; Carleton Hoffner Jr.	No pewter medals awarded	
1946	Chicago	Anne Davies; Carleton Hoffner Jr.	Lois Waring; Walter Bainbridge	Carmel Waterbury; Edward Bodel	No pewter medals awarded	
1947	Berkeley	Lois Waring; Walter Bainbridge Jr.	Anne Davies; Carleton Hoffner Jr.	Marcella May Willis; Frank Davenport	No pewter medals awarded	
1948	Colorado Springs	Lois Waring; Walter Bainbridge Jr.	Anne Davies; Carleton Hoffner Jr.	Irene Maguire; Walter Muehlbronner	No pewter medals awarded	
1949	Colorado Springs	Lois Waring; Walter Bainbridge Jr.	Irene Maguire; Walter Muehlbronner	Carmel Bodel; Edward Bodel	No pewter medals awarded	
1950	Washington, D.C.	Lois Waring; Michael McGean	Irene Maguire; Walter Muehlbronner	Anne Davies; Carleton Hoffner Jr.	No pewter medals awarded	
1951	Seattle	Carmel Bodel; Edward Bodel	Virginia Hoyns; Donald Jacoby	Carol Ann Peters; Daniel Ryan	No pewter medals awarded	
1952	Colorado Springs	Lois Waring; Michael McGean	Carol Ann Peters; Daniel Ryan	Carmel Bodel; Edward Bodel	No pewter medals awarded	
1953	Hershey	Carol Ann Peters; Daniel Ryan	Virginia Hoyns; Donald Jacoby	Carmel Bodel; Edward Bodel	No pewter medals awarded	
1954	Los Angeles	Carmel Bodel; Edward Bodel	Phyllis Forney; Martin Forney	Patsy Riedel; Roland Junso	No pewter medals awarded	
1955	Colorado Springs	Carmel Bodel; Edward Bodel	Joan Zamboni; Roland Junso	Phyllis Forney; Martin Forney	No pewter medals awarded	
1956	Philadelphia	Joan Zamboni; Roland Junso	Carmel Bodel; Edward Bodel	Sidney Arnold; Franklin Nelson	No pewter medals awarded	
1957	Berkeley	Sharon McKenzie; Bert Wright	Joan Zamboni; Roland Junso	Carmel Bodel; Edward Bodel	No pewter medals awarded	
1958	Minneapolis	Andree Jacoby; Donald Jacoby	Claire O'Neill; John Bejshak Jr.	Susan Sebo; Tim Brown	No pewter medals awarded	
1959	Rochester	Andree Jacoby; Donald Jacoby	Margie Ackles; Charles Phillips Jr.	Judy Ann Lamar; Ronald Ludington	No pewter medals awarded	
1960	Seattle	Margie Ackles; Charles Phillips Jr.	Marilyn Meeker; Larry Pierce	Yvonne Littlefield; Roger Campbell	No pewter medals awarded	
1961	Colorado Springs	Diane Sherbloom; Larry Pierce	Dona Lee Carrier; Roger Campbell	Patricia Dineen; Robert Dineen	No pewter medals awarded	
1962	Boston	Yvonne Littlefield; Peter Betts	Dorothyann Nelson; Pieter Kollen	Lorna Dyer; King Cole	No pewter medals awarded	
1963	Long Beach	Sally Schantz; Stanley Urban	Yvonne Littlefield; Peter Betts	Lorna Dyer; John Carrell	No pewter medals awarded	
1964	Cleveland	Darlene Streich; Charles Fetter Jr.	Carole MacSween; Robert Munz	Lorna Dyer; John Carrell	No pewter medals awarded	
1965	Lake Placid	Kristin Fortune; Dennis Sveum	Lorna Dyer; John Carrell	Susan Urban; Stanley Urban	No pewter medals awarded	
1966	Berkeley	Kristin Fortune; Dennis Sveum	Lorna Dyer; John Carrell	Susan Urban; Stanley Urban	No pewter medals awarded	
1967	Omaha	Lorna Dyer; John Carrell	Alma Davenport; Roger Berry	Judy Schwomeyer; James Sladky	No pewter medals awarded	
1968	Philadelphia	Judy Schwomeyer; James Sladky	Vicki Camper; Eugene Heffron	Debbie Gerken; Raymond Tiedemann	No pewter medals awarded	
1969	Seattle	Judy Schwomeyer; James Sladky	Joan Bitterman; Brad Hislop	Debbie Gerken; Raymond Tiedemann	No pewter medals awarded	
1970	Tulsa	Judy Schwomeyer; James Sladky	Anne Millier; Harvey Millier	Debbie Ganson; Brad Hislop	No pewter medals awarded	
1971	Buffalo	Judy Schwomeyer; James Sladky	Anne Millier; Harvey Millier	Mary Karen Campbell; Johnny Johns	No pewter medals awarded	
1972	Long Beach	Judy Schwomeyer; James Sladky	Anne Millier; Harvey Millier	Mary Karen Campbell; Johnny Johns	No pewter medals awarded	
1973	Minneapolis	Mary Karen Campbell; Johnny Johns	Anne Millier; Harvey Millier	Jane Pankey; Richard Horne	No pewter medals awarded	
1974	Providence	Colleen O'Connor; Jim Millns	Anne Millier; Harvey Millier	Michelle Ford; Glenn Patterson	No pewter medals awarded	
1975	Oakland	Colleen O'Connor; Jim Millns	Judi Genovesi; Kent Weigle	Michelle Ford; Glenn Patterson	No pewter medals awarded	
1976	Colorado Springs	Colleen O'Connor; Jim Millns	Judi Genovesi; Kent Weigle	Susan Kelley; Andrew Stroukoff	No pewter medals awarded	
1977	Hartford	Judi Genovesi; Kent Weigle	Susan Kelley; Andrew Stroukoff	Michelle Ford; Glenn Patterson	No pewter medals awarded	
1978	Portland	Stacey Smith; John Summers	Carol Fox; Richard Dalley	Susan Kelley; Andrew Stroukoff	No pewter medals awarded	
1979	Cincinnati	Stacey Smith; John Summers	Carol Fox; Richard Dalley	Judy Blumberg; Michael Seibert	No pewter medals awarded	
1980	Atlanta	Stacey Smith; John Summers	Judy Blumberg; Michael Seibert	Carol Fox; Richard Dalley	No pewter medals awarded	
1981	San Diego	Judy Blumberg; Michael Seibert	Carol Fox; Richard Dalley	Kim Krohn; Barry Hagan	No pewter medals awarded	
1982	Indianapolis	Judy Blumberg; Michael Seibert	Carol Fox; Richard Dalley	Elisa Spitz; Scott Gregory	No pewter medals awarded	
1983	Pittsburgh	Judy Blumberg; Michael Seibert	Elisa Spitz; Scott Gregory	Carol Fox; Richard Dalley	No pewter medals awarded	
1984	Salt Lake City	Judy Blumberg; Michael Seibert	Carol Fox; Richard Dalley	Elisa Spitz; Scott Gregory	No pewter medals awarded	
1985	Kansas City	Judy Blumberg; Michael Seibert	Renée Roca; Donald Adair	Suzanne Semanick; Scott Gregory	No pewter medals awarded	
1986	Uniondale	Renée Roca; Donald Adair	Suzanne Semanick; Scott Gregory	Lois Luciani; Russ Witherby	No pewter medals awarded	
1987	Tacoma	Suzanne Semanick; Scott Gregory	Renée Roca; Donald Adair	Susan Wynne; Joseph Druar	No pewter medals awarded	
1988	Denver	Suzanne Semanick; Scott Gregory	Susan Wynne; Joseph Druar	April Sargent; Russ Witherby	Renée Roca; James Yorke	
1989	Baltimore	Susan Wynne; Joseph Druar	April Sargent; Russ Witherby	Suzanne Semanick; Ron Kravette	Jeanne Miley; Michael Verlich	
1990	Salt Lake City	Susan Wynne; Joseph Druar	April Sargent; Russ Witherby	Suzanne Semanick; Ron Kravette	Jeanne Miley; Michael Verlich	
1991	Minneapolis	Elizabeth Punsalan; Jerod Swallow	April Sargent; Russ Witherby	Jeanne Miley; Michael Verlich	Elizabeth McLean; Ron Kravette	
1992	Orlando	April Sargent-Thomas; Russ Witherby	Rachel Mayer; Peter Breen	Elizabeth Punsalan; Jerod Swallow	Jeanne Miley; Michael Verlich	
1993	Phoenix	Renée Roca; Gorsha Sur	Susan Wynne; Russ Witherby	Elizabeth Punsalan; Jerod Swallow	Amy Webster; Ron Kravette	
1994	Detroit	Elizabeth Punsalan; Jerod Swallow	Susan Wynne; Russ Witherby	Amy Webster; Ron Kravette	Wendy Millette; Jason Tebo	
1995	Providence	Renée Roca; Gorsha Sur	Elizabeth Punsalan; Jerod Swallow	Amy Webster; Ron Kravette	Kate Robinson; Peter Breen	
1996	San Jose	Elizabeth Punsalan; Jerod Swallow	Renée Roca; Gorsha Sur	Eve Chalom; Mathew Gates	Kate Robinson; Peter Breen	
1997	Nashville	Elizabeth Punsalan; Jerod Swallow	Eve Chalom; Mathew Gates	Kate Robinson; Peter Breen	Amy Webster; Ron Kravette	
1998	Philadelphia	Elizabeth Punsalan; Jerod Swallow	Jessica Joseph; Charles Butler	Naomi Lang; Peter Tchernyshev	Eve Chalom; Mathew Gates	
1999	Salt Lake City	Naomi Lang; Peter Tchernyshev	Eve Chalom; Mathew Gates	Deborah Koegel; Oleg Fediukov	Beata Handra; Charles Sinek	
2000	Cleveland	Naomi Lang; Peter Tchernyshev	Jamie Silverstein; Justin Pekarek	Deborah Koegel; Oleg Fediukov	Beata Handra; Charles Sinek	
2001	Boston	Naomi Lang; Peter Tchernyshev	Tanith Belbin; Benjamin Agosto	Jessica Joseph; Brandon Forsyth	Beata Handra; Charles Sinek	
2002	Los Angeles	Naomi Lang; Peter Tchernyshev	Tanith Belbin; Benjamin Agosto	Melissa Gregory; Denis Petukhov	Beata Handra; Charles Sinek	
2003	Dallas	Naomi Lang; Peter Tchernyshev	Tanith Belbin; Benjamin Agosto	Melissa Gregory; Denis Petukhov	Loren Galler-Rabinowitz; David Mitchell	
2004	Atlanta	Tanith Belbin; Benjamin Agosto	Melissa Gregory; Denis Petukhov	Loren Galler-Rabinowitz; David Mitchell	Kendra Goodwin; Brent Bommentre	
2005	Portland	Tanith Belbin; Benjamin Agosto	Melissa Gregory; Denis Petukhov	Lydia Manon; Ryan O'Meara	Tiffany Stiegler; Sergey Magerovskiy	
2006	St. Louis	Tanith Belbin; Benjamin Agosto	Melissa Gregory; Denis Petukhov	Jamie Silverstein; Ryan O'Meara	Morgan Matthews; Maxim Zavozin	
2007	Spokane	Tanith Belbin; Benjamin Agosto	Melissa Gregory; Denis Petukhov	Meryl Davis; Charlie White	Kimberly Navarro; Brent Bommentre	
2008	Saint Paul	Tanith Belbin; Benjamin Agosto	Meryl Davis; Charlie White	Kimberly Navarro; Brent Bommentre	Emily Samuelson; Evan Bates	
2009	Cleveland	Meryl Davis; Charlie White	Emily Samuelson; Evan Bates	Kimberly Navarro; Brent Bommentre	Madison Hubbell; Keiffer Hubbell	
2010	Spokane	Meryl Davis; Charlie White	Tanith Belbin; Benjamin Agosto	Emily Samuelson; Evan Bates	Kimberly Navarro; Brent Bommentre	
2011	Greensboro	Meryl Davis; Charlie White	Maia Shibutani; Alex Shibutani	Madison Chock; Greg Zuerlein	Madison Hubbell; Keiffer Hubbell	
2012	San Jose	Meryl Davis; Charlie White	Maia Shibutani; Alex Shibutani	Madison Hubbell; Zachary Donohue	Lynn Kriengkrairut; Logan Giulietti-Schmitt	
2013	Omaha	Meryl Davis; Charlie White	Madison Chock; Evan Bates	Maia Shibutani; Alex Shibutani	Madison Hubbell; Zachary Donohue	
2014	Boston	Meryl Davis; Charlie White	Madison Chock; Evan Bates	Maia Shibutani; Alex Shibutani	Madison Hubbell; Zachary Donohue	
2015	Greensboro	Madison Chock; Evan Bates	Maia Shibutani; Alex Shibutani	Madison Hubbell; Zachary Donohue	Kaitlin Hawayek; Jean-Luc Baker	
2016	Saint Paul	Maia Shibutani; Alex Shibutani	Madison Chock; Evan Bates	Madison Hubbell; Zachary Donohue	Anastasia Cannuscio; Colin McManus	
2017	Kansas City	Maia Shibutani; Alex Shibutani	Madison Chock; Evan Bates	Madison Hubbell; Zachary Donohue	Elliana Pogrebinsky; Alex Benoit	
2018	San Jose	Madison Hubbell; Zachary Donohue	Maia Shibutani; Alex Shibutani	Madison Chock; Evan Bates	Kaitlin Hawayek; Jean-Luc Baker	
2019	Detroit	Madison Hubbell; Zachary Donohue	Madison Chock; Evan Bates	Kaitlin Hawayek; Jean-Luc Baker	Lorraine McNamara; Quinn Carpenter	
2020	Greensboro	Madison Chock; Evan Bates	Madison Hubbell; Zachary Donohue	Kaitlin Hawayek; Jean-Luc Baker	Christina Carreira; Anthony Ponomarenko	
2021	Las Vegas	Madison Hubbell; Zachary Donohue	Madison Chock; Evan Bates	Kaitlin Hawayek; Jean-Luc Baker	Caroline Green; Michael Parsons	
2022	Nashville	Madison Chock; Evan Bates	Madison Hubbell; Zachary Donohue	Kaitlin Hawayek; Jean-Luc Baker	Caroline Green; Michael Parsons	
2023	San Jose	Madison Chock; Evan Bates	Caroline Green; Michael Parsons	Christina Carreira; Anthony Ponomarenko	Emilea Zingas; Vadym Kolesnik	
2024	Columbus	Madison Chock; Evan Bates	Christina Carreira; Anthony Ponomarenko	Emily Bratti; Ian Somerville	Caroline Green; Michael Parsons	
2025	Wichita	Madison Chock; Evan Bates	Christina Carreira; Anthony Ponomarenko	Caroline Green; Michael Parsons	Emilea Zingas; Vadym Kolesnik	
2026	St. Louis	Madison Chock; Evan Bates	Emilea Zingas; Vadym Kolesnik	Christina Carreira; Anthony Ponomarenko	Caroline Green; Michael Parsons	

== Compulsory figures ==
Competitions in compulsory figures were held for the last time at the 1999 U.S. Championships in Salt Lake City.

=== Men's figures ===
Men's figures event medalists
Year	Location	Gold	Silver	Bronze	Pewter	Ref.
1991	Minneapolis	Craig Heath	Michael Weiss	Gig Siruno	Brian Schmidt	
1992	Orlando	Brian Schmidt	Gig Siruno	Troy Goldstein	Scott Cormier	
1993	Phoenix	Gig Siruno	Brian Schmidt	J. Robert Morris	Troy Goldstein	
1994	Detroit	Gig Siruno	Brian Schmidt	Eddie Gornik	Jay Cochon	
1995	Providence	John Baldwin Jr.	Kevin Donovan	Everett Weiss	Anthony Chicalace	
1996	San Jose	Everett Weiss	Anthony Chicalace	Anthony Bardin	Brian Beutsch	
1997	Nashville	Everett Weiss	Robert Shmalo	No other competitors		

=== Women's figures ===
Women's figures event medalists
Year	Location	Gold	Silver	Bronze	Pewter	Ref.
1991	Minneapolis	Kelly Ann Szmurlo	Jennifer Leng	Karen Ann Gooley	Leigh Keiser	
1992	Orlando	Kelly Ann Szmurlo	Sarah Gendreau	Sharon Sargent	Karen Ann Gooley	
1993	Phoenix	Kelly Ann Szmurlo	Carese Busby	Kristin Meyer	Karen Ann Gooley	
1994	Detroit	Melanie Dupon	Kristin Meyer	Carese Busby	Shannon Livingston	
1995	Providence	Lisa Bryson	Melanie Dupon	Jennifer Blount	Cassy Papajohn	
1996	San Jose	Cassy Papajohn	Melanie Dupon	McKenzie Savidge	Jennifer Blount	
1997	Nashville	Melanie Dupon	McKenzie Savidge	Sarah Devereaux	Brandy Biddle	
1998	Philadelphia	Cassy Papajohn	Lynne Petta	Sarah Devereaux	Elizabeth Handley	
1999	Salt Lake City	Lisa Frenzel Swain	Sonja Gullen	Lauren Hill & Lynne Petta (tied)	No pewter medal awarded	

== Records ==
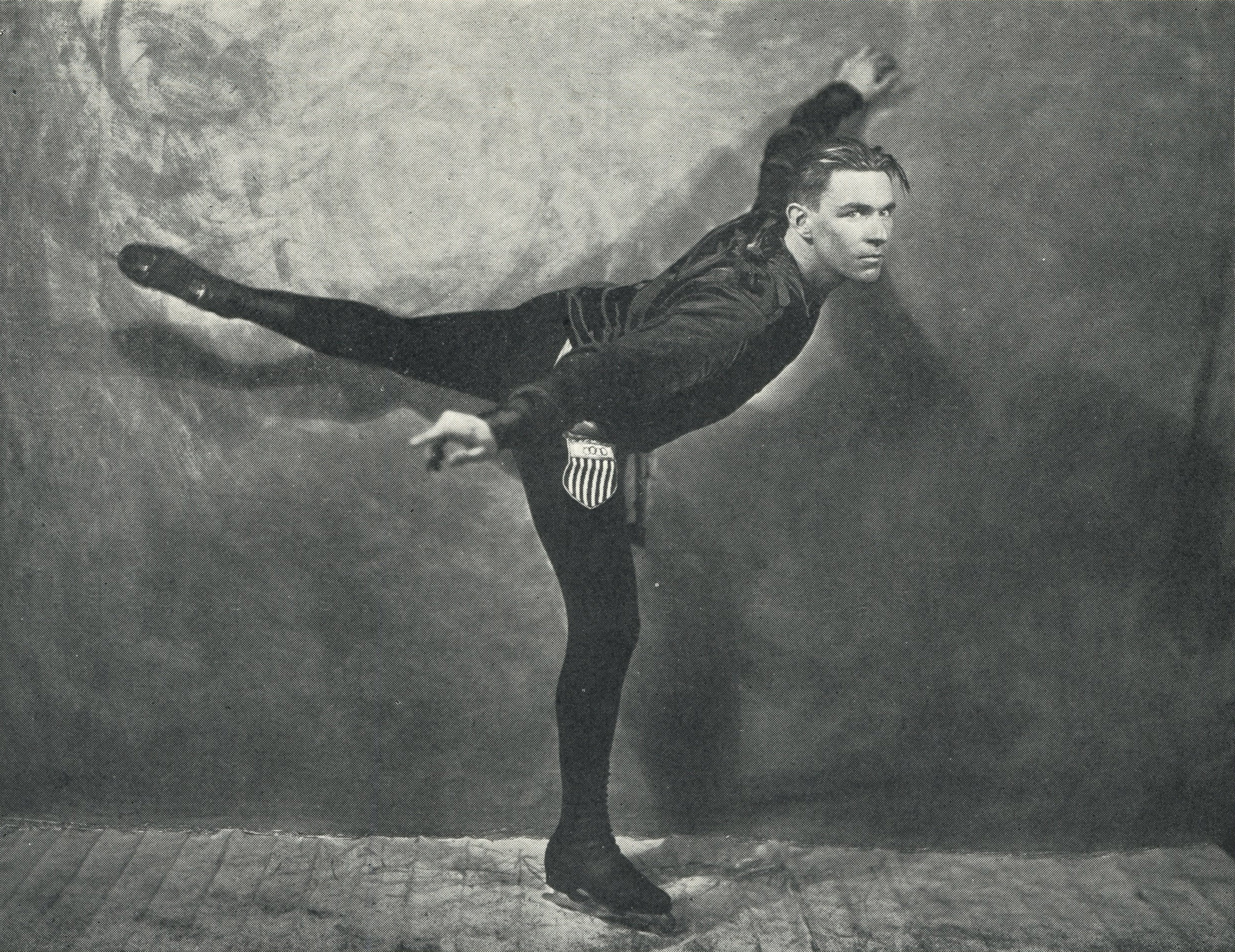
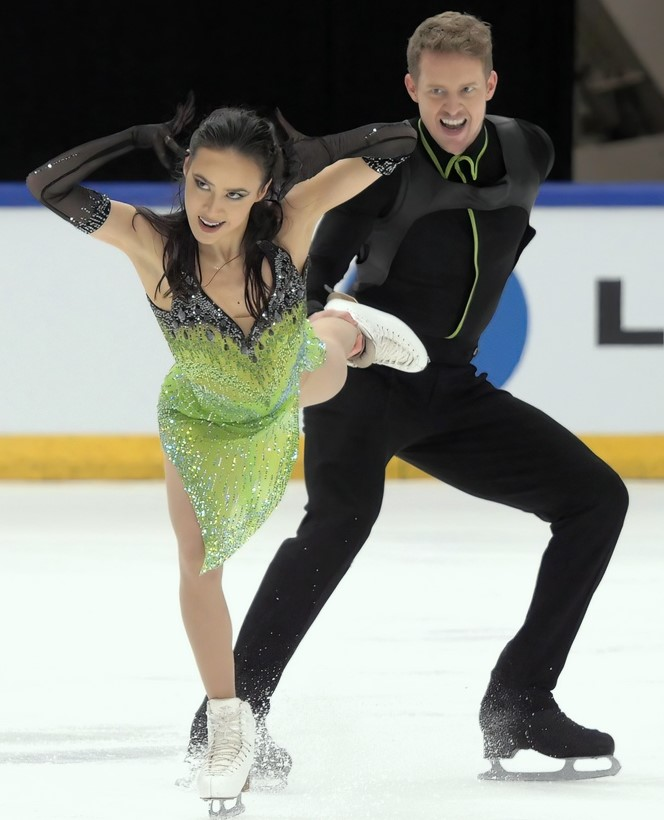
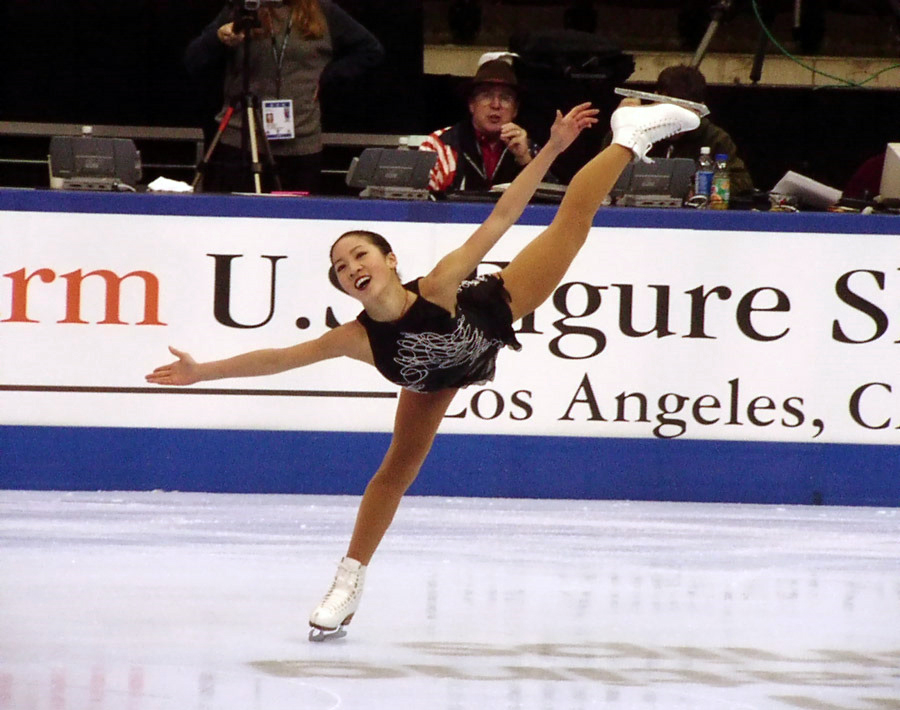
From left to right: Roger Turner won seven U.S. Championship titles in men's singles; Madison Chock and Evan Bates won seven U.S. Championship titles in ice dance; and Michelle Kwan won nine U.S. Championship titles in women's singles.

Records
Discipline	Most championship titles			
Discipline	Skater(s)	No.	Years	Ref.
Men's singles	Dick Button	7	1946–52	
Men's singles	Roger Turner	7	1928–34	
Women's singles	Michelle Kwan	9	1996; 1998–2005	
Women's singles	Maribel Vinson	9	1928–33; 1935–37	
Pairs	Theresa Weld-Blanchard; Nathaniel Niles	9	1918; 1920–27	
Ice dance	Madison Chock; Evan Bates	7	2015; 2020; 2022–26	
