= George Braakman =

American figure skater

George Theodore Braakman (1903 – 1965) was an American figure skater. He competed as a singles skater and as a pair skater with Ada Bauman.

== Results ==
=== Singles ===
Event	1923	1924	1925	1926	1927
U.S. Championships	1st J	4th	2nd		3rd

=== Pairs ===
(with Bauman)

Event	1925	1926	1927	1928
U.S. Championships	2nd		3rd	3rd
