= Robin Lee (figure skater) =

American figure skater

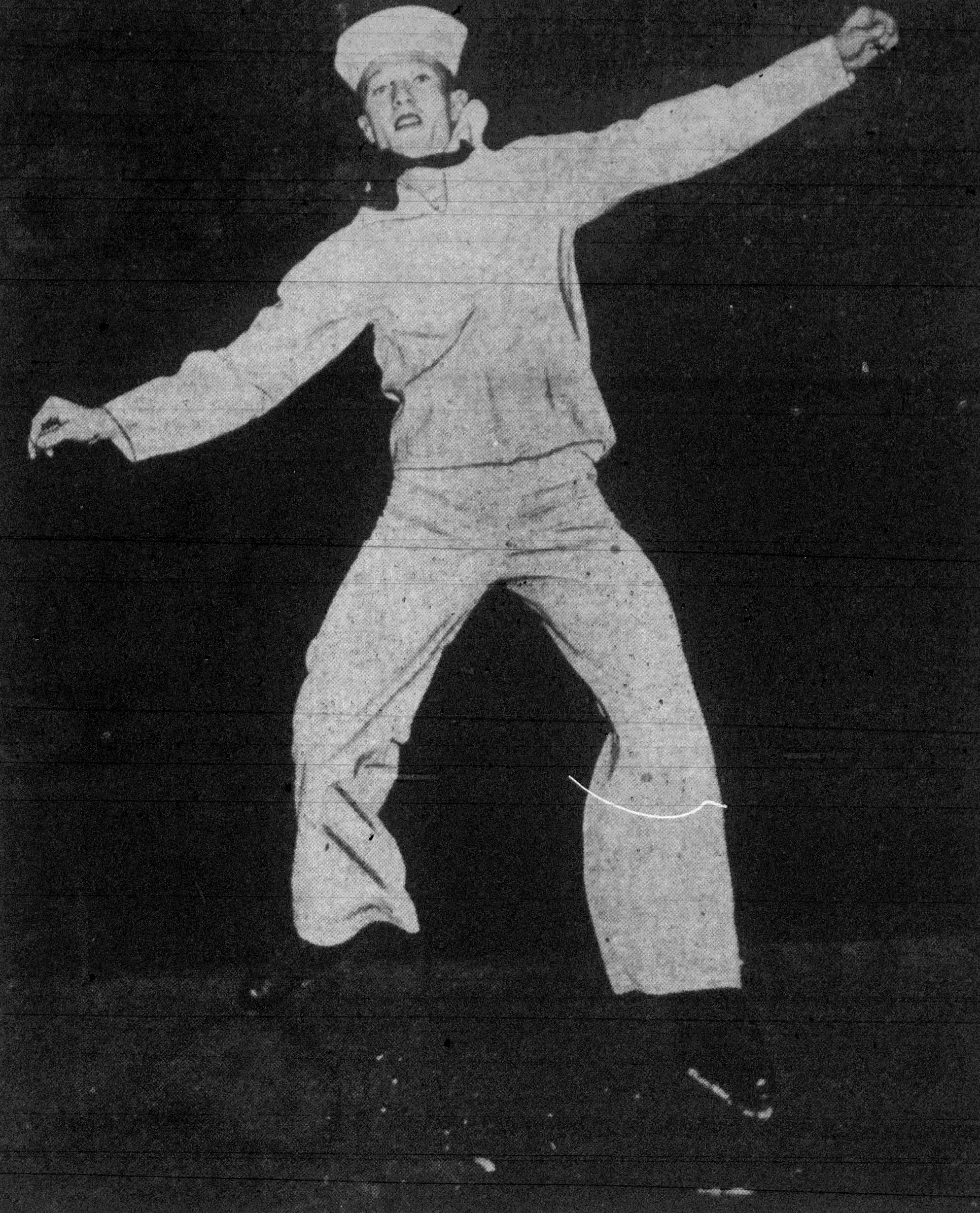
- Lee, circa 1942

Personal information
- Full name: Robin Huntington Lee
- Born: December 2, 1919 Saint Paul, Minnesota
- Died: October 8, 1997 (aged 77) Minneapolis, Minnesota

Figure skating career
- Country: United States
- Skating club: St. Paul FSC; Chicago FSC; SC of New York; FSC of Minneapolis
Medal record
Representing United States
Men's Figure skating
North American Championships
Silver medal – second place	1939 Toronto	Men's singles
Silver medal – second place	1935 Montreal	Men's singles
Bronze medal – third place	1933 New York	Men's singles
U.S. Championships
Gold medal – first place	1935 New Haven	Men’s Singles
Gold medal – first place	1936 New York City	Men’s Singles
Gold medal – first place	1937 Chicago	Men’s Singles
Gold medal – first place	1938 Philadelphia	Men’s Singles
Gold medal – first place	1939 Saint Paul	Men’s Singles
Silver medal – second place	1934 Philadelphia	Men’s Singles
Bronze medal – third place	1933 New Haven	Men’s Singles

Robin Huntington Lee (December 2, 1919 in Saint Paul, Minnesota – October 8, 1997 in Minneapolis) was an American figure skater. He was the 1935-1939 U.S. national champion. At age 12, he became the youngest skater to win the junior national title. At the 1935 United States Figure Skating Championships, at the age of 15, he became the first and, as of 2008, the only skater to defeat a seven time national champion in the United States.

Lee represented the United States at the 1936 Winter Olympics, where he placed 12th. He was selected to compete at the 1940 Winter Olympics, which were canceled due to World War II. During the War, Lee served in the U.S. Navy. After the War, Lee skated professionally in ice shows and worked as a coach.

Lee was inducted into the U.S. Figure Skating Hall of Fame in 1995. He attended Erasmus Hall High School.

The Robin Lee Midwest Open is a USFS sanctioned competition held each year in the summer by Lee's home club, the Figure Skating Club of Minneapolis, named in his honor.

== Competitive highlights ==
Event	1931	1932	1933	1934	1935	1936	1937	1938	1939
Winter Olympic Games						12th			
World Championships		9th				8th			
North American Championships			3rd		2nd				2nd
U.S. Championships	3rd J	1st J	3rd	2nd	1st	1st	1st	1st	1st
Levels: J = Junior
