= Louise Weigel =

American figure skater (1912–1982)

Personal information
- Full name: Louise E. Weigel Atwill
- Born: August 26, 1912 Buffalo, New York
- Died: 1982 (aged 69–70) Buffalo, New York

Figure skating career
- Country: United States

Louise E. Weigel Atwill (August 26, 1912 in Buffalo, New York – December 1982 in Buffalo) was an American figure skater. She competed in the Winter Olympic Games twice and twice won the ladies silver medal at the United States Figure Skating Championships. Her younger sister, Estelle Weigel, also skated in the Olympics.

On October 9, 2018, Louise was inducted into the Greater Buffalo (NY) Sports Hall of Fame along with her sisters, Estelle and Mary.

== Results ==
Event	1930	1931	1932	1933	1934	1935	1936
Winter Olympics			14th				21st
U.S. Championships			3rd	3rd	2nd	3rd	2nd
U.S. Junior Championships	2nd J	2nd J	1st J				
