= Hulda Berger =

American figure skater (1891–1951)

Hulda Berger (August 15, 1891 - August 24, 1951) was an American figure skater. She won the ladies bronze medal at the 1931 U.S. Figure Skating Championships. Berger died on August 24, 1951.

== Results ==
Event	1926	1928	1929	1930	1931	1932	1933	1934
U.S. Championships	3rd J	2nd J	2nd J	1st J	3rd	7th	4th	5th
