= Marjorie Parker Smith =

American figure skater

Personal information
- Born: March 3, 1916
- Died: January 17, 2009 (aged 92)
Medal record
Representing United States
Fours' Figure skating
North American Championships
Bronze medal – third place	1939 Toronto	Fours

Marjorie Parker Smith (March 3, 1916 – January 17, 2009) was an American figure skater who competed in ice dancing, pair skating, single skating, and fours in the latter part of the 1930s.

Nearly fifty years later, she again gained championship status in running the 300-yard and the 600-yard dashes.

Parker Smith was a member of the first official United States Ice Dancing Championship team and an inductee in the United States Figure Skating Hall of Fame, Class of 2009. She also was on the board of directors of the Society of Old Brooklynites where she was a life member. Parker Smith devoted many hours of volunteer service to NYC-based WABC Radio's 'Call For Action' program.

She died aged 92 on January 17, 2009, at her home in Brooklyn, New York.

Parker Smith was inducted into United States Figure Skating Hall of Fame January 23, 2009, in the “Golden” category at the 2009 United States Figure Skating Championships in Cleveland.

== Figure skating results ==
=== Pairs ===
(with Howard Meredith)

Event	1936
U.S. Championships	3rd

=== Ice dance ===
(with Joseph Savage)

Event	1936	1937	1943
U.S. Championships	1st	2nd	2nd

(with George Boltres)

Event	1938	1939
U.S. Championships	4th	3rd

=== Fours ===
(with Nettie Prantel, Joseph Savage, and George Boltres)

Event	1939
North American Championships	3rd

=== Other medals ===
- Gold: 1936 U.S. National Dance Champion
- Gold: 1939 Dance Fours (Skating Club of New York)
- Bronze: National Novice Single
- Bronze: National Senior Pair

== Master track & field - World records ==
- 1984 600 yard dash (2.23.5 minutes)
- 1985 300 yard dash (71.50 seconds)
