= Audrey Peppe =

American figure skater

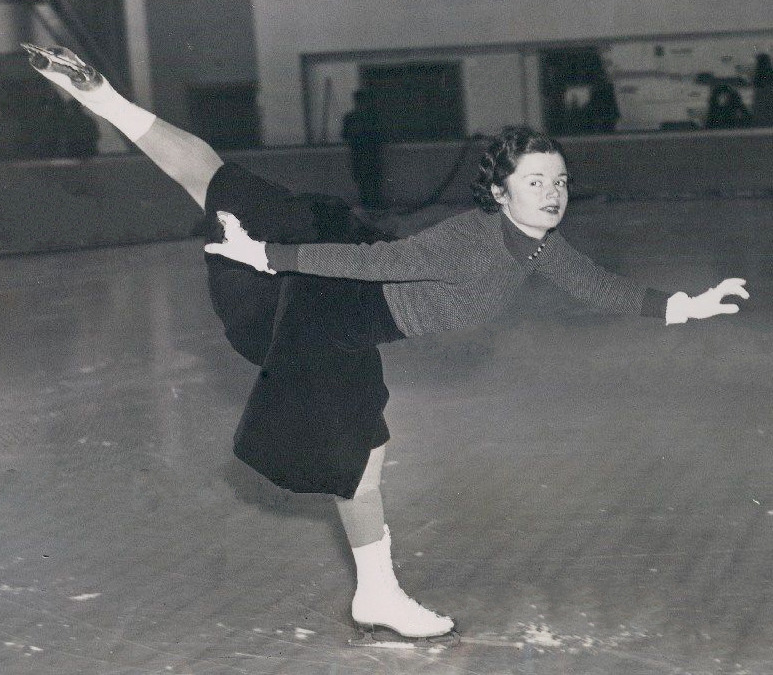
- Peppe in 1935

Personal information
- Full name: Audrey Frances Peppe
- Born: October 12, 1917 New York City
- Died: April 1, 1992 (aged 74) Queens, New York, U.S.
- Home town: Long Beach, New York, U.S.
- Spouses: David Benner (m. 1940, div. 19??); Robert Rapee (m. 1944)

Figure skating career
- Country: United States
- Skating club: Skating Club of New York
- Retired: 1939; turned professional in 1940 and ran the figure skating program at Sun Valley, Idaho. Later taught skating at the Skating Club of New York

Audrey Frances Peppe (later Benner, October 12, 1917 – April 1, 1992) was an American figure skater. She was the 1936 U.S. bronze medalist and 1938–1939 silver medalist. She lost the 1938 national title to Joan Tozzer by 1/10 of a point. Peppe competed at the 1936 Winter Olympics, where she placed twelfth in the singles event. She turned professional in December 1939.

Peppe was the niece of Beatrix Loughran, who also coached her. In May 1940 she married David Benner but the marriage did not last. In 1944 she married Robert Rapee, son of symphony conductor Ernö Rapée. They had one child.

== Results ==
Event	1932	1933	1934	1936	1937	1938	1939
Winter Olympics				12th			
World Championships				13th	12th		
European Championships					11th		
U.S. Championships	3rd J	4th J	4th	3rd		2nd	2nd
