= Suzanne Davis (figure skater) =

American figure skater (1912–1991)

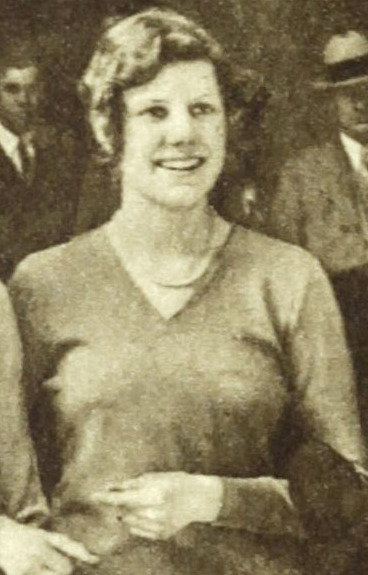
- Davis at the 1930 World Championship

Personal information
- Other names: Suzanne Davis King Bradshaw
- Born: February 7, 1912 Waban, Massachusetts, U.S.
- Died: July 28, 1991 (aged 79) Richmond, Virginia, U.S.

Figure skating career
- Country: United States
- Skating club: SC of Boston
Medal record
Ladies' figure skating
Representing the United States
North American Championships
Bronze medal – third place	1935 Montreal	Ladies' singles
Bronze medal – third place	1933 New York	Ladies' singles
Bronze medal – third place	1929 Boston	Ladies' singles

Suzanne Davis King Bradshaw (née Davis; February 7, 1912 – July 28, 1991) was an American figure skater who competed in ladies singles. She was the 1934 U.S. national champion.

== Early life ==
Suzanne Davis was born on February 7, 1912, in Waban, Massachusetts. She graduated from Erskine Junior College in Boston.

== Career ==
She began skating at the age of nine and joined the Skating Club of Boston at the age of 13. At 15, she was the National Junior Ladies Champion. In 1929, she was a member of the United States World Team. She competed in the 1932 Winter Olympics and finished twelfth in the ladies singles competition. She placed second in the U.S. Ladies Championship in 1933. She won the U.S. Ladies Championship in 1934. She won the U.S. Dance Championship with partner Frederick Goodridge in 1934.

She retired from competitive skating in 1935 and became a U.S. Figure Skating Association national judge and skated in charity benefits. She helped establish the Skating Club of Richmond in 1974. In 1986, she appeared on "The Show of Champions" on ABC's Wide World of Sports. She was on the local boards of the American Red Cross and Girl Scouts. She was a president and honorary board member of the Virginia Home. She was president of Three Chopt Garden Club. She was Richmond Newspapers' Christmas Mother in 1979.

== Personal life ==
Davis married William Haven King in 1935 and moved to Richmond, Virginia. They had one daughter and son, Susan and William Haven Jr. Her husband died in 1978. She later married William Richmond Bradshaw.

She died on July 28, 1991, at Stuart Circle Hospital in Richmond.

== Results ==
Event	1927	1928	1929	1930	1931	1932	1933	1934	1935
Winter Olympics						12th			
World Championships				6th		11th			
North American Championships			3rd				3rd		3rd
U.S. Championships	1st J	2nd	3rd	3rd			2nd	1st	2nd
