= J. Lester Madden =

American figure skater

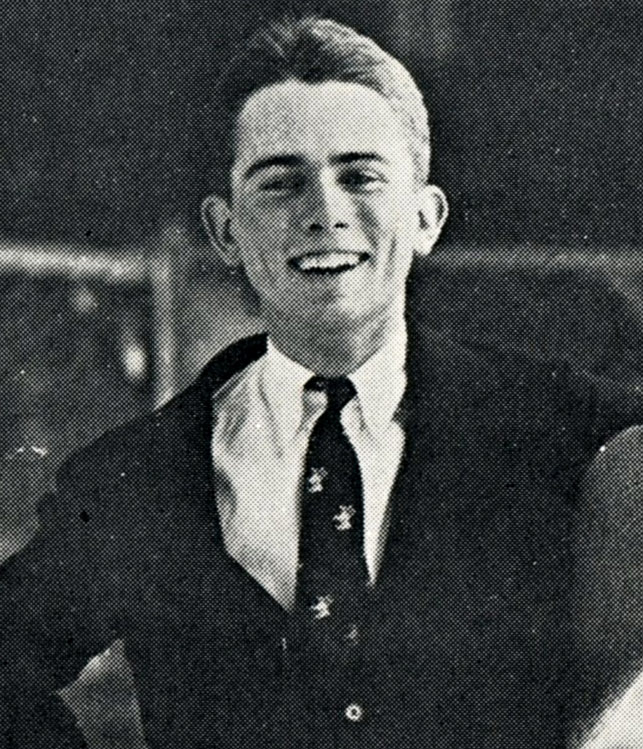
- Madden in 1929

Personal information
- Full name: James Lester Madden
- Born: December 13, 1909 Boston, Massachusetts
- Died: September 15, 1984 (aged 74) Boston, Massachusetts

Figure skating career
- Country: United States
- Skating club: SC of Boston
Medal record
Representing United States
Men's figure skating
North American Championships
Bronze medal – third place	1935 Montreal	Men's singles
Silver medal – second place	1933 New York	Men's singles
Pairs Figure skating
North American Championships
Bronze medal – third place	1937 Boston	Pairs

James Lester Madden (December 13, 1909 – September 15, 1984) was an American figure skater who competed in men's singles and pair skating. His pairs partner was his sister, Grace. He and Grace Madden were the 1934 U.S. national pairs champions.

He was born and died in Boston, Massachusetts.

In singles, he placed seventh at the 1932 Winter Olympics. In pairs, he and Grace Madden placed 11th at the 1936 Winter Olympics.

He graduated from Harvard University and Harvard Business School.

== Results ==
(men's singles)

Event	1927	1928	1929	1930	1931	1932	1933	1934	1935
Winter Olympic Games						7th			
World Championships				7th		6th			
North American Championships							2nd		3rd
U.S. Championships	4th J	1st J	3rd	2nd	2nd	2nd	2nd	4th	2nd

(pairs with Grace Madden)

Event	1931	1932	1933	1934	1935	1936	1937	1938
Winter Olympic Games						11th		
World Championships						6th		
North American Championships							3rd	
U.S. Championships	3rd	4th	2nd	1st	2nd		2nd	2nd
