= George Hill (figure skater) =

American figure skater

Personal information
- Full name: George Edward Bellows Hill
- Born: April 24, 1907 Boston, Massachusetts, U.S.
- Died: September 17, 1992 (aged 85) Kentfield, California, U.S.

Figure skating career
- Country: United States
- Discipline: Men's singles, pairs
- Partner: Maribel Vinson
- Skating club: SC of Boston
Medal record
North American Championships
Silver medal – second place	1937 Boston	Pairs
Gold medal – first place	1935 Montreal	Pairs

George Edward Bellows Hill (April 24, 1907 in Boston, Massachusetts – September 17, 1992 in Kentfield, California) was an American figure skater who competed in single skating and pair skating. As a pair skater, he was the 1933, 1935, 1936, and 1937 U.S. national champion with partner Maribel Vinson. As a single skater, he was the 1930, 1931, 1934, and 1936 U.S. bronze medalist.

He competed in singles at the 1931 World Figure Skating Championships, where he placed 11th. He represented the United States at the 1936 Winter Olympics in both singles and pairs. He placed 22nd in singles and 5th in pairs with Vinson.

He graduated from Harvard College in 1933 and from Massachusetts Institute of Technology in 1937.

== Competitive highlights ==
=== Single skating ===
Event	1927	1928	1929	1930	1931	1932	1933	1934	1935	1936
Winter Olympic Games										22nd
World Championships					11th					
U.S. Championships	8th J	2nd J	1st J	3rd	3rd			3rd		3rd

=== Pair skating with Vinson ===
Event	1930	1931	1932	1933	1934	1935	1936	1937
Winter Olympic Games							5th	
World Championships		5th					5th	
North American Championships						1st		2nd
U.S. Championships	2nd	2nd	2nd	1st		1st	1st	1st
