= Gretchen Merrill =

American figure skater

Personal information
- Other names: Queenie
- Born: November 2, 1925 Boston, Massachusetts
- Died: April 22, 1965 (aged 39) Windsor, Connecticut

Figure skating career
- Country: United States
- Skating club: Skating Club of Boston
Medal record
Representing the United States
Ladies' Figure skating
World Championships
Bronze medal – third place	1947 Stockholm	Ladies' singles
European Championships
Silver medal – second place	1947 Davos	Ladies' singles
North American Championships
Silver medal – second place	1945 New York	Ladies' singles

Gretchen Merrill (November 2, 1925 – April 22, 1965) was an American figure skater. Gretchen was a six-time (1943–1948) U.S. national champion and thrice placed second in 1941, 1942 and 1949. She was the 1947 European silver medalist and World bronze medalist, winning those medals in the first World and Europeans Championships to be held since 1939. She was the second and last American woman to win a medal at the European Championships; following 1948, the competition was restricted to skaters representing European countries. Merrill placed 8th at the 1948 Winter Olympics.

She was married to William O. Gay and died in 1965. She was inducted into the United States Figure Skating Hall of Fame in 2000.

== Results ==
Event	1939	1940	1941	1942	1943	1944	1945	1946	1947	1948	1949
Winter Olympics										8th	
World Championships									3rd		
European Championships									2nd		
North American Championships							2nd				
U.S. Championships	1st J	4th	2nd	2nd	1st	1st	1st	1st	1st	1st	2nd
