= Grace Madden =

American figure skater (1911–1987)

Personal information
- Full name: Grace E. Madden
- Born: July 30, 1911 Marblehead, Massachusetts, U.S.
- Died: June 14, 1987 (aged 75) Darien, Connecticut, U.S.

Figure skating career
- Country: United States
- Skating club: SC of Boston
Medal record
Representing United States
Pairs Figure skating
North American Championships
| Bronze medal – third place | 1937 Boston | Pairs |

Grace E. Madden (married name: Ward; born July 30, 1911, in Marblehead, Massachusetts, died June 14, 1987, in Darien, Connecticut) was an American pair skater. With brother J. Lester Madden, she was the 1934 U.S. national champion. They competed at the 1936 Winter Olympics and placed 11th.

== Results ==
(pairs with J. Lester Madden)

| Event | 1931 | 1932 | 1933 | 1934 | 1935 | 1936 | 1937 | 1938 |
|---|---|---|---|---|---|---|---|---|
| Winter Olympic Games | | | | | | 11th | | |
| World Championships | | | | | | 6th | | |
| North American Championships | | | | | | | 3rd | |
| U.S. Championships | 3rd | 4th | 2nd | 1st | 2nd | | 2nd | 2nd |
