= Yvonne Sherman =

American figure skater

Personal information
- Born: May 3, 1930 Colorado Springs, Colorado
- Died: February 2, 2005 (aged 74)

Figure skating career
- Country: United States
Medal record
Representing the United States
Ladies' figure skating
World Championships
Bronze medal – third place	1950 London	Ladies' singles
Silver medal – second place	1949 Paris	Ladies' singles
North American Championships
Gold medal – first place	1949 Philadelphia	Ladies' singles
Bronze medal – third place	1947 Ottawa	Ladies' singles
Pairs figure skating
North American Championships
Silver medal – second place	1947 Ottawa	Pairs

Yvonne C. Sherman Tutt (May 3, 1930 – February 2, 2005) was an American figure skater. She won the gold medal at the U.S. Figure Skating Championships twice in ladies' single skating and once in pair skating with Robert Swenning. Sherman competed in both disciplines in the 1948 Winter Olympics.

After her competitive career ended, Sherman became a skating judge. She was married to William Thayer Tutt, a prominent skating administrator and promoter from Colorado Springs. Both Tutts were inducted into the United States Figure Skating Hall of Fame in 1991.

== Results ==
=== Singles ===
Event	1940	1941	1943	1945	1946	1947	1948	1949	1950
Winter Olympics							6th		
World Championships							6th	2nd	3rd
North American Championships						3rd		1st	
U.S. Championships	7th J	10th J	6th J	2nd J	2nd J	1st J	2nd	1st	1st

=== Pairs ===
(with Swenning)

Event	1947	1948
Winter Olympics		4th
World Championships		5th
North American Championships	2nd	
U.S. Championships	1st	2nd
