= Harold Hartshorne =

American ice dancer

Personal information
- Full name: Harold Hartshorne
- Born: September 8, 1891 New York City, US
- Died: February 15, 1961 (aged 69) Berg-Kampenhout, Flemish Brabant, Belgium
- Cause of death: Plane crash

Figure skating career
- Country: United States
- Partner: Kathe Mehl; Nettie Prantell; Sandy MacDonald
- Skating club: SC of New York

Harold Hartshorne (September 8, 1891 – February 15, 1961) was an American ice dancer.

With partner Nettie Prantell, he was the 1937-1938 U.S. Champion and 1943 bronze medalist. With partner Sandy MacDonald, he was the 1939-1941 U.S. Champion and 1942 silver medalist. With partner Kathe Mehl, he is the 1944 U.S. silver medalist.

After his competitive career ended, Hartshorne became a skating judge. He was en route to the World Figure Skating Championships with colleagues and athletes, when his plane (Sabena Flight 548) crashed near Brussels, Belgium, killing all on board. His wife, Louisa, was also killed in the crash.

He was one of the founders of the Skating Club of New York. At the time of his death, in 1961, he was the president of the Skating Club of New York and the U.S. Figure Skating dance committee chairman.

He attended Princeton University.

The Hartshorne Estate at 80 Oakes Road, Little Silver, New Jersey is on the list of Monmouth County Historic Sites. The home was designed by renowned architect, Roger Bullard.

In 1981, twenty years after his death, Hartshorne was inducted into the United States Figure Skating Hall of Fame.

== Results ==
=== Ice Dance ===
(with Prantell)

| Event | 1936 | 1937 | 1938 | 1943 |
|---|---|---|---|---|
| U.S. Championships | 2nd | 1st | 1st | 3rd |

(with MacDonald)

| Event | 1939 | 1940 | 1941 | 1942 |
|---|---|---|---|---|
| U.S. Championships | 1st | 1st | 1st | 2nd |

(with Mehl)

| Event | 1944 |
|---|---|
| U.S. Championships | 2nd |
