= William Nagle (figure skater) =

American figure skater

William Joseph Nagle (May 9, 1885 – April 10, 1970) was an American figure skater who competed in men's singles. He finished eighth at the World Figure Skating Championships in 1930 and eleventh at the 1932 Winter Olympics. He won the bronze medal at the United States Figure Skating Championships in 1937, 1941, and 1943, all after his 50th birthday. He was born in Jersey City, New Jersey.
