= U.S. Junior Figure Skating Championships =

Recurring figure skating competition

- Status: Active
- Genre: National championships
- Frequency: Annual
- Country: United States
- Inaugurated: 1918
- Previous event: 2026 U.S. Championships
- Next event: 2027 U.S. Championships
- Organizer: U.S. Figure Skating

The U.S. Junior Figure Skating Championships are an annual figure skating competition organized by U.S. Figure Skating to crown the junior-level national champions of the United States. Medals are awarded in men's singles, women's singles, pair skating, and ice dance. The first U.S. Championships for junior-level skaters were held in 1918 in New York City, and featured the men's and women's events. Skaters may qualify for the national championships by competing at either the Pacific Coast Sectional Finals, Eastern Sectional Finals, Midwestern Sectional Finals, U.S. Ice Dance Finals, or U.S. Pairs Finals. The results of the competition are among the criteria used to determine the American teams to the World Junior Championships. They have been held without interruption since 1920.

Beginning with the 1988 U.S. Championships, pewter medals have been awarded to the fourth-place finishers in each event. Compulsory figures, which had been a required element of men's and women's single skating since the championships began, were retired after the 1990 U.S. Championships, although they continued as a separate event for men and women from 1991 to 1999, when they were retired altogether.

During the COVID-19 pandemic, the 2021 U.S. Championships were still held, albeit in a sealed arena with no live audience present. The sound of an audience was piped into the arena, seats were filled with fan cutouts, and the athletes' friends and families could be seen cheering them on via strategically-placed monitors.

Three days after the 2025 U.S. Championships, a group of twenty-eight skaters, coaches, and family members flying to Washington, D.C., were killed when their airplane collided with a military helicopter and crashed into the Potomac River. Coaches Evgenia Shishkova and Vadim Naumov, the parents of U.S. skater Maxim Naumov, who had just won the pewter medal in the senior men's event, were among those killed.

The 2027 U.S. Championships are scheduled to be held from January 5 to 10 at the Maverik Center in Salt Lake City, Utah.

== Qualification ==
Beginning with the 2022–23 season, skaters qualify for the U.S. Championships by competing in the National Qualifying Series (NQS), a series of regional competitions running from mid-July to early October. Skaters compete in one of three sections (Pacific Coast, Midwestern, or Eastern) based on geographic location. The highest-placed skaters and teams across all competitions advance to the NQS finals (Pacific Coast Sectional Finals, Eastern Sectional Finals, Midwestern Sectional Finals, U.S. Ice Dance Finals, or U.S. Pairs Finals). The top juvenile, intermediate, and novice skaters are invited to the National High Performance Development Camp, while junior and senior skaters advance to the U.S. Championships. Athletes may also receive a bye to the NQS finals by being assigned to and competing at an international assignment from an approved list.

Advancement to the U.S. Figure Skating Championships:

- Single skating: 18 spots available
  - Athletes receiving a bye
  - Top two from each section, plus the next best scores nationwide until the maximum number of entrants is met
- Pair skating: 12 spots available
  - Athletes receiving a bye
  - Next best scores from the NQS Finals until the maximum number of entrants is met
- Ice dance: 15 spots available
  - Athletes receiving a bye
  - Next best scores from the NQS Finals until the maximum number of entrants is met

Skaters can earn the right at the U.S. Championships without qualifying through a sectional championship by accomplishing any of the following:

1. Placing in the top five in their respective discipline at the previous U.S. Championships at the senior level
2. Selection to the previous year's World Championship team
3. Winning a medal at any Winter Olympic Games (excluding the team event)
4. Qualifying for the Junior Grand Prix of Figure Skating Final or Grand Prix of Figure Skating Final
5. Competing at three international competitions from an approved list

== Medalists ==
=== Men's singles ===
Junior men's event medalists
Year	Location	Gold	Silver	Bronze	Pewter	Ref.
1918	New York City	Sherwin Badger	Emil Fuchs	No other competitors		
1919	No competition held					
1920	New York City	Oscar Richard	Charles Wyman	Emil Fuchs	No pewter medals awarded	
1921	Philadelphia	George Greenslee	Raymond Harvey	Einar Josephson & Charles McCarthy (tied)	No pewter medals awarded	
1922	Boston	Louis Van Washburn	Charles Wyman	Charles Rotch	No pewter medals awarded	
1923	New Haven	George Braakman	Charles Wyman	Heaton Robertson	No pewter medals awarded	
1924	Philadelphia	Egbert Carey Jr.	Charles Wyman	Heaton Robertson	No pewter medals awarded	
1925	New York City	Ferrier Martin	Joseph Savage	Heaton Robertson	No pewter medals awarded	
1926	Boston	Roger Turner	Joseph Savage	Heaton Robertson	No pewter medals awarded	
1927	New York City	Frederick Goodridge	Gail Borden II	Roy Shipstad	No pewter medals awarded	
1928	New Haven	J. Lester Madden	George Hill	Roy Shipstad	No pewter medals awarded	
1929	New York City	George Hill	Joseph Savage	William Nagle	No pewter medals awarded	
1930	Providence	Gail Borden II	Heaton Robertson	Robert Rothman	No pewter medals awarded	
1931	Boston	Joseph Savage	Lyman Wakefield	Robin Lee	No pewter medals awarded	
1932	New York City	Robin Lee	Bruce Mapes	George Boltres	No pewter medals awarded	
1933	New Haven	William Swallender	Bruce Mapes	Lyman Wakefield	No pewter medals awarded	
1934	Philadelphia	George Boltres	Wilfred MacDonald	Richard Hapgood	No pewter medals awarded	
1935	New Haven	Erie Relter	Bruce Mapes	Ollie Haupt Jr.	No pewter medals awarded	
1936	New York City	Bernard Fox	Ollie Haupt Jr.	Eugene Reichel	No pewter medals awarded	
1937	Chicago	Ollie Haupt Jr.	Eugene Turner	Eugene Reichel	No pewter medals awarded	
1938	Philadelphia	Eugene Turner	Leonard Brennan	Edward Berkson	No pewter medals awarded	
1939	Saint Paul	Arthur Vaughn Jr.	Arthur Preusch Jr.	Bud Brennan	No pewter medals awarded	
1940	Cleveland	Bobby Specht	Murray Galbraith	Sheldon Galbraith	No pewter medals awarded	
1941	Boston	William Grimditch Jr.	Arthur Preusch Jr.	Edward LeMaire	No pewter medals awarded	
1942	Chicago	Walter Sahlin	Edward LeMaire	Robert Premer	No pewter medals awarded	
1943	New York City	Edward LeMaire	Marcus Nelson	James Lochead Jr.	No pewter medals awarded	
1944	Minneapolis	James Lochead Jr.	Michael McGean	Robert Swenning	No pewter medals awarded	
1945	New York City	Richard Button	Michael McGean	Robert Swenning	No pewter medals awarded	
1946	Chicago	John Lettengarver	Charles Brinkman	Robert Swenning	No pewter medals awarded	
1947	Berkeley	Robert Swenning	Dudley Richards	Charles Brinkman	No pewter medals awarded	
1948	Colorado Springs	Hayes Alan Jenkins	Walter Bainbridge Jr.	Donald Jacoby	No pewter medals awarded	
1949	Colorado Springs	Richard Dwyer	Donald Jacoby	Dudley Richards	No pewter medals awarded	
1950	Washington, D.C.	Donald Laws	Barry Gorman	Evy Scotvold II	No pewter medals awarded	
1951	Seattle	Dudley Richards	Evy Scotvold II	David Jenkins	No pewter medals awarded	
1952	Colorado Springs	Ronald Robertson	Armando Rodriguez	David Jenkins	No pewter medals awarded	
1953	Hershey	David Jenkins	William Nick	Tim Brown	No pewter medals awarded	
1954	Los Angeles	Tim Brown	Raymond Blommer	William Nick	No pewter medals awarded	
1955	Colorado Springs	Tom Moore	Robert Lee Brewer	Barlow Nelson	No pewter medals awarded	
1956	Philadelphia	Robert Lee Brewer	Barlow Nelson	Bradley Lord	No pewter medals awarded	
1957	Berkeley	Bradley Lord	James Short	Lorin Caccamise	No pewter medals awarded	
1958	Minneapolis	James Short	Gregory Kelley	Lorin Caccamise	No pewter medals awarded	
1959	Rochester	Gregory Kelley	Don Mike Anthony	Frank Carroll	No pewter medals awarded	
1960	Seattle	Douglas Ramsay	Bruce Heiss	Frank Carroll	No pewter medals awarded	
1961	Colorado Springs	Monty Hoyt	Scott Allen	David Edwards	No pewter medals awarded	
1962	Boston	Thomas Litz	Gary Visconti	Buddy Zack	No pewter medals awarded	
1963	Long Beach	Billy Chapel	Richard Callaghan	Tim Wood	No pewter medals awarded	
1964	Cleveland	Tim Wood	Duane Maki	Richard Callaghan	No pewter medals awarded	
1965	Lake Placid	Paul McGrath	Robert Black	Ron Frank	No pewter medals awarded	
1966	Berkeley	John Misha Petkevich	James Disbrow	W. Patrick Lalor	No pewter medals awarded	
1967	Omaha	Roger Bass	Gordon McKellen	Torrey Sun	No pewter medals awarded	
1968	Philadelphia	Kenneth Shelley	Richard Inglesi	John Baldwin	No pewter medals awarded	
1969	Seattle	John Baldwin	Doug Berndt	Kenneth Class	No pewter medals awarded	
1970	Tulsa	Richard Ewell III	Jimmy Demogines	Mahlon Bradley	No pewter medals awarded	
1971	Buffalo	David Santee	Mahlon Bradley	Scott Cramer	No pewter medals awarded	
1972	Long Beach	Terry Kubicka	Scott Cramer	John Carlow	No pewter medals awarded	
1973	Minneapolis	John Carlow Jr.	Scott Cramer	Bill Schneider	No pewter medals awarded	
1974	Providence	Randy Gardner	Ken Newfield	Perry Jewell	No pewter medals awarded	
1975	Oakland	Tim Zink	Perry Jewell	Scott Sherman	No pewter medals awarded	
1976	Colorado Springs	Scott Hamilton	Mark Cockerell	Dave Kinser	No pewter medals awarded	
1977	Hartford	Robert Wagenhoffer	Reggie Stanley	Reggie Raiford	No pewter medals awarded	
1978	Portland	Brian Boitano	Patrick Hughes	James Santee	No pewter medals awarded	
1979	Cincinnati	James Santee	Bobby Beauchamp	Stuart Bailey	No pewter medals awarded	
1980	Atlanta	Tom Dickson	Paul Wylie	Jim White	No pewter medals awarded	
1981	San Diego	Paul Wylie	John Filbig	James Cygan	No pewter medals awarded	
1982	Indianapolis	James Cygan	Daniel Doran	Christopher Bowman	No pewter medals awarded	
1983	Pittsburgh	Christopher Bowman	Angelo D'Agostino	Daniel Doran	No pewter medals awarded	
1984	Salt Lake City	William Lawe	Winfrid Mayer	Doug Mattis	No pewter medals awarded	
1985	Kansas City	Doug Mattis	Erik Larson	Rudy Galindo	No pewter medals awarded	
1986	Uniondale	Mark Mitchell	Erik Larson	Rudy Galindo	No pewter medals awarded	
1987	Tacoma	Todd Eldredge	Patrick Brault	Craig Heath	No pewter medals awarded	
1988	Denver	Christopher Mitchell	Aren Nielsen	Cameron Birky	Shepherd Clark	
1989	Baltimore	Shepherd Clark	Colin Vander Veen	John Baldwin Jr.	Scott Davis	
1990	Salt Lake City	Scott Davis	Michael Chack	John Baldwin Jr.	Steven B. Smith	
1991	Minneapolis	Damon Allen	John Baldwin Jr.	Ryan Hunka	Steven B. Smith	
1992	Orlando	Ryan Hunka	Daniel Hollander	John Baldwin Jr.	John Bevan	
1993	Phoenix	Michael Weiss	Matthew Kessinger	John Bevan	Clifford Retamar	
1994	Detroit	Jere Michael	Jason Sylvia	John Bevan	Matthew Kessinger	
1995	Providence	Matthew Kessinger	Trifun Zivanovic	Ryan Jahnke	Derrick Delmore	
1996	San Jose	Timothy Goebel	Jeff Merica	Ryan Jahnke	Justin Dillon	
1997	Nashville	Matt Savoie	Justin Dillon	Michael Edgren	Kurt Fromknecht	
1998	Philadelphia	Scott Smith	Braden Overett	Kurt Fromknecht	Daniel Lee	
1999	Salt Lake City	Ryan Bradley	Don Baldwin	Parker Pennington	Johnny Weir	
2000	Cleveland	Evan Lysacek	Parker Pennington	Benjamin Miller	Daniel Lee	
2001	Boston	Parker Pennington	Benjamin Miller	Michael Villarreal	Shaun Rogers	
2002	Los Angeles	Nicholas LaRoche	Shaun Rogers	Benjamin Miller	Matthew Lind	
2003	Dallas	Dennis Phan	Jordan Brauninger	Adam Aronowitz	Christopher Toland	
2004	Atlanta	Christopher Toland	Jason Wong	Wesley Campbell	Tommy Steenberg	
2005	Portland	Jeremy Abbott	Craig Ratterree	Michael Peters	Douglas Razzano	
2006	St. Louis	Stephen Carriere	Jonathan Trinh	Geoffry Varner	Daisuke Murakami	
2007	Spokane	Eliot Halverson	Brandon Mroz	Austin Kanallakan	Curran Oi	
2008	Saint Paul	Adam Rippon	Brandon Mroz	Andrew Gonzales	Richard Dornbush	
2009	Cleveland	Ross Miner	Keegan Messing	Alexander Johnson	Grant Hochstein	
2010	Spokane	Jason Brown	Joshua Farris	Max Aaron	Scott Dyer	
2011	Greensboro	Max Aaron	Alexander Zahradnicek	Alexander Aiken	Steven Evans	
2012	San Jose	Nathan Chen	Timothy Dolensky	Philip Warren	Harrison Choate	
2013	Omaha	Vincent Zhou	Shotaro Omori	Nathan Chen	Jimmy Ma	
2014	Boston	Nathan Chen	Jordan Moeller	Jimmy Ma	Chase Belmontes	
2015	Greensboro	Andrew Torgashev	Kevin Shum	Paolo Borromeo	Alexei Krasnozhon	
2016	Saint Paul	Tomoki Hiwatashi	Kevin Shum	Alexei Krasnozhon	Paolo Borromeo	
2017	Kansas City	Alexei Krasnozhon	Camden Pulkinen	Ryan Dunk	Eric Sjoberg	
2018	San Jose	Camden Pulkinen	Dinh Tran	Maxim Naumov	Ryan Dunk	
2019	Detroit	Ryan Dunk	Dinh Tran	Joonsoo Kim	Peter Liu	
2020	Greensboro	Maxim Naumov	Eric Sjoberg	Liam Kapeikis	Lucas Altieri	
2021	Las Vegas	Eric Prober	Joseph Klein	Samuel Mindra	Jacob Sanchez	
2022	Nashville	Kai Kovar	Will Annis	Maxim Zharkov	Joseph Klein	
2023	San Jose	Lucas Broussard	Jacob Sanchez	Robert Yampolsky	Daniil Murzin	
2024	Columbus	Lucius Kazanecki	Taira Shinohara	Aleksandr Fegan	Beck Strommer	
2025	Wichita	Lorenzo Elano	Aleksandr Fegan	Patrick Blackwell	Kirk Haugeto	
2026	St. Louis	Patrick Blackwell	Caleb Farrington	Louis Mallane	Nicholas Brooks	

=== Women's singles ===
Junior women's event medalists
Year	Location	Gold	Silver	Bronze	Pewter	Ref.
1918	New York City	Clara Frothingham	Rosaline Dunn	Lillian Cramer	No pewter medal awarded	
1919	No competition held					
1920	New York City	Rosaline Dunn	Sonia Wilson	Beatrix Loughran	No pewter medals awarded	
1921	Philadelphia	Beatrix Loughran	Guinevere Knott	Rosalie Knapp	No pewter medals awarded	
1922	Boston	Helen Stantial	Rosalie Knapp	Guinevere Knott	No pewter medals awarded	
1923	New Haven	Rosalie Knapp	Ada Bauman	Miss Cabot	No pewter medals awarded	
1924	Philadelphia	Maribel Vinson	Guinevere Knott	Julia Honan	No pewter medals awarded	
1925	New York City	Ada Bauman	Julia Honan	Gertrude Meredith	No pewter medals awarded	
1926	Boston	Julia Honan	Grace Munstock	Hulda Berger	No pewter medals awarded	
1927	New York City	Suzanne Davis	Grace Munstock	Margaret Bennett	No pewter medals awarded	
1928	New Haven	Virginia Badger	Hulda Berger	Evelyn Chandler Mapes	No pewter medals awarded	
1929	New York City	Evelyn Chandler Mapes	Hulda Berger	Grace Madden	No pewter medals awarded	
1930	Providence	Hulda Berger	Louise Weigel	Margaret Bennett	No pewter medals awarded	
1931	Boston	Margaret Bennett	Louise Weigel	Grace Madden	No pewter medals awarded	
1932	New York City	Louise Weigel	Estelle Weigel	Audrey Peppe	No pewter medals awarded	
1933	New Haven	Estelle Weigel	Valerie Jones	Grace Madden	No pewter medals awarded	
1934	Philadelphia	Valerie Jones	Frances Johnson	Polly Blodgett	No pewter medals awarded	
1935	New Haven	Polly Blodgett	Frances Johnson	A.V. Kloss	No pewter medals awarded	
1936	New York City	Katherine Durbrow	Joan Tozzer	Mary Weigel	No pewter medals awarded	
1937	Chicago	Joan Tozzer	Frances Johnson	Jane Vaughn	No pewter medals awarded	
1938	Philadelphia	Charlotte Walther	Dorothy Snell	Mary C. Taylor	No pewter medals awarded	
1939	Saint Paul	Gretchen Merrill	Dorothy Snell	Shirley Bowman	No pewter medals awarded	
1940	Cleveland	Ramona Allen	Betsy Nichols	Roberta Jenks	No pewter medals awarded	
1941	Boston	Donna Atwood	Roberta Jenks	Phebe Tucker	No pewter medals awarded	
1942	Chicago	Dorothy Goos	Janette Ahrens	Betsy Nichols	No pewter medals awarded	
1943	New York City	Hildegarde Balmain	Mabel MacPherson	Betsy Nichols	No pewter medals awarded	
1944	Minneapolis	Madelon Olson	Shirley Lander	Joan Yocum	No pewter medals awarded	
1945	New York City	Eileen Seigh	Yvonne Sherman	Joan Swanston	No pewter medals awarded	
1946	Chicago	Barbara Jones	Yvonne Sherman	Shirley Lander	No pewter medals awarded	
1947	Berkeley	Yvonne Sherman	Barbara Torrano	Helen Uhl	No pewter medals awarded	
1948	Colorado Springs	Virginia Baxter	Margaret Graham	Faris Nourse	No pewter medals awarded	
1949	Colorado Springs	Sonya Klopfer	Margaret Graham	Gloria Peterson	No pewter medals awarded	
1950	Washington, D.C.	Tenley Albright	Margaret Graham	Slavka Kohout	No pewter medals awarded	
1951	Seattle	Frances Dorsey	Janet Gerhauser	Patricia Firth	No pewter medals awarded	
1952	Colorado Springs	Carol Heiss	Patricia Firth	Betty Lynne Stogner	No pewter medals awarded	
1953	Hershey	Patricia Firth	Catherine Machado	Mary Ann Dorsey	No pewter medals awarded	
1954	Los Angeles	Catherine Machado	Sherry Dorsey	Claralynn Lewis	No pewter medals awarded	
1955	Colorado Springs	Nancy Heiss	Janice Marie Crappa	Sherry Dorsey	No pewter medals awarded	
1956	Philadelphia	Joan Schenke	Lynn Finnegan	Sherry Dorsey	No pewter medals awarded	
1957	Berkeley	Carol Joyce Wanek	Lynn Finnegan	Stephanie Westerfeld	No pewter medals awarded	
1958	Minneapolis	Barbara Ann Roles	Stephanie Westerfeld	Laurence Owen	No pewter medals awarded	
1959	Rochester	Laurence Owen	Stephanie Westerfeld	Rhode Lee Michelson	No pewter medals awarded	
1960	Seattle	Karen Howland	Rhode Lee Michelson	Vicky Fisher	No pewter medals awarded	
1961	Colorado Springs	Lorraine Hanlon	Carol Noir	Lynn Thomas	No pewter medals awarded	
1962	Boston	Christine Haigler	Myrna Bodek	Albertina Noyes	No pewter medals awarded	
1963	Long Beach	Albertina Noyes	Joya Utermohlen	Peggy Fleming	No pewter medals awarded	
1964	Cleveland	Carol Noir	Taffy Pergament	Louise Wakefield	No pewter medals awarded	
1965	Lake Placid	Sharon Bates	Pamela Schneider	Sondra Lee Holmes	No pewter medals awarded	
1966	Berkeley	Janet Lynn	Gail Newberry	Wendy Jones	No pewter medals awarded	
1967	Omaha	Julie Lynn Holmes	Patty Grazier	Flizie Gorgan	No pewter medals awarded	
1968	Philadelphia	Barbara Ray	Lise Gantz	Wen-An Sun	No pewter medals awarded	
1969	Seattle	Louise Vacca	Mary Lynn Gelderman	Audrey King	No pewter medals awarded	
1970	Tulsa	Juli McKinstry	Dorothy Hamill	Melissa Militano	No pewter medals awarded	
1971	Buffalo	Melissa Militano	Mary Marley	Patricia Shelley	No pewter medals awarded	
1972	Long Beach	Wendy Burge	Laurie Brandel	Barbara Salomon	No pewter medals awarded	
1973	Minneapolis	Laurie Brandel	Linda Fratianne	Kim McIsaac	No pewter medals awarded	
1974	Providence	Barbara Smith	Teresa Foy	Tracey Cahill	No pewter medals awarded	
1975	Oakland	Lisa-Marie Allen	Jeanne Chapman	Leslie Glenn	No pewter medals awarded	
1976	Colorado Springs	Carrie Rugh	Jeanne Chapman	Sandy Lenz	No pewter medals awarded	
1977	Hartford	Sandy Lenz	Cindy Perpich	Clarissa Perrella	No pewter medals awarded	
1978	Portland	Jill Sawyer	Alicia Risberg	Cindy Moyers	No pewter medals awarded	
1979	Cincinnati	Elaine Zayak	Jacki Farrell	Lynn Smith	No pewter medals awarded	
1980	Atlanta	Vikki de Vries	Tiffany Chin	Melissa Jeanne Thomas	No pewter medals awarded	
1981	San Diego	Jill Frost	Kelly Webster	Jennifer Newman	No pewter medals awarded	
1982	Indianapolis	Lorilee Pritchard	Staci McMullin	Kathy Rissmiller	No pewter medals awarded	
1983	Pittsburgh	Kathryn Adams	Yvonne Gómez	Rosanna Tovi	No pewter medals awarded	
1984	Salt Lake City	Allison Oki	Tracey Ernst	Jana Sjodin	No pewter medals awarded	
1985	Kansas City	Jill Trenary	Tracey Damigella	Holly Cook	No pewter medals awarded	
1986	Uniondale	Cindy Bortz	Julie Wasserman	E. Rory Flack	No pewter medals awarded	
1987	Tacoma	Jeri Campbell	Kristi Yamaguchi	Tonia Kwiatkowski	No pewter medals awarded	
1988	Denver	Dena Galech	Jennifer Leng	Shenon Badre	Jessica Mills	
1989	Baltimore	Kyoko Ina	Jessica Mills	Tisha Walker	Geremi Weiss	
1990	Salt Lake City	Alice Sue Claeys	Geremi Weiss	Dana MacDonald	Nicole Bobek	
1991	Minneapolis	Lisa Ervin	Joanna Ng	Karen Anne Gooley	Tristen Vega	
1992	Orlando	Carolina Song	Lisa Matras	Lefki Terzakis	Teresa Aiello	
1993	Phoenix	Michelle Cho	Jenna Pitman	Teresa Aiello	Tanya Street	
1994	Detroit	Jennifer Karl	Amanda Ward	Lisa Bell	Crisha Gossard	
1995	Providence	Sydne Vogel	Tara Lipinski	Brittney McConn	Amy D'Entremont	
1996	San Jose	Shelby Lyons	Erin Sutton	Diana Miro	Serena Phillips	
1997	Nashville	Andrea Gardiner	Erin Pearl	Morgan Rowe	J.J. Matthews	
1998	Philadelphia	Sarah Hughes	Andrea Aggeler	Erin Pearl	Naomi Nari Nam	
1999	Salt Lake City	Sara Wheat	Sasha Cohen	Jennifer Kirk	Elizabeth Kwon	
2000	Cleveland	Ann Patrice McDonough	Lisa Nesuda	Kathryn Orscher	Dirke O'Brien Baker	
2001	Boston	Joan Cristobal	Alissa Czisny	Lindsey Weber	Colette Irving	
2002	Los Angeles	Louann Donovan	Jennifer Don	Felicia Beck	Adriana DeSanctis	
2003	Dallas	Erica Archambault	Natalie Mecher	Danielle Kahle	Alexandra Patterson	
2004	Atlanta	Kimmie Meissner	Katy Taylor	Brianna Perry	Erin Reed	
2005	Portland	Sandra Jean Rucker	Christine Zukowski	Megan Oster	Tenile Victorsen	
2006	St. Louis	Megan Hyatt	Rachael Flatt	Melissa Bulanhagui	Ashley Wagner	
2007	Spokane	Mirai Nagasu	Caroline Zhang	Ashley Wagner	Blake Rosenthal	
2008	Saint Paul	Alexe Gilles	Angela Maxwell	Brittney Rizo	Kristine Musademba	
2009	Cleveland	DeeDee Leng	Ellie Kawamura	Christina Gao	Kristiene Gong	
2010	Spokane	Agnes Zawadzki	Yasmin Siraj	Lindsay Davis	Kiri Baga	
2011	Greensboro	Courtney Hicks	Lauren Dinh	Katarina Kulgeyko	McKinzie Daniels	
2012	San Jose	Gracie Gold	Ashley Cain	Hannah Miller	Barbie Long	
2013	Omaha	Polina Edmunds	Mariah Bell	Barbie Long	Karen Chen	
2014	Boston	Amber Glenn	Tyler Pierce	Ashley Shin	Bradie Tennell	
2015	Greensboro	Bradie Tennell	Olivia Serafini	Vivian Le	Elena Taylor	
2016	Saint Paul	Emily Chan	Vivian Le	Megan Wessenberg	Rebecca Peng	
2017	Kansas City	Kaitlyn Nguyen	Starr Andrews	Ashley Lin	Emmy Ma	
2018	San Jose	Alysa Liu	Pooja Kalyan	Ting Cui	Hanna Harrell	
2019	Detroit	Gabriella Izzo	Audrey Shin	Emilia Murdock	Sarah Jung	
2020	Greensboro	Lindsay Thorngren	Isabeau Levito	Calista Choi	Isabelle Inthisone	
2021	Las Vegas	Isabeau Levito	Kanon Smith	Clare Seo	Ava Marie Ziegler	
2022	Nashville	Clare Seo	Ava Marie Ziegler	Josephine Lee	Katie Shen	
2023	San Jose	Soho Lee	Keira Hilbelink	Elyce Lin-Gracey	Sherry Zhang	
2024	Columbus	Logan Higase-Chen	Keira Hilbelink	Cleo Park	Emilia Nemirovsky	
2025	Wichita	Sophie Joline von Felten	Skylar Lautowa-Peguero	Jessica Jurka	Emilia Nemirovsky	
2026	St. Louis	Angela Shao	Annika Chao	Hannah Kim	Jessica Jurka	

=== Pairs ===
Junior pairs event medalists
Year	Location	Gold	Silver	Bronze	Pewter	Ref.
1923	New Haven	Ruth Chapman; Joseph Chapman	Mrs. Sloan; Heaton Robertson	No other competitors		
1924	Philadelphia	Ada Bauman; George Braakman	Sydney Goode; James Greene	Mrs. H.W. Howe; H.W. Howe	No pewter medals awarded	
1925	New York City	Sydney Goode; James Greene	Dorothy Weld; Richard Hapgood	Mrs. H.W. Howe; H.W. Howe	No pewter medals awarded	
1926	Boston	Beatrix Loughran; Raymond Harvey	Dorothy Weld; Richard Hapgood	Virginia Slattery; Ferrier Martin	No pewter medals awarded	
1927	New York City	Maribel Vinson; Thornton Coolidge	A. Boyrer; Gail Borden	Dorothy Weld; Richard Hapgood	No pewter medals awarded	
1928	New Haven	Grace Madden; J. Lester Madden	Dorothy Weld; Richard Hapgood	Ethel Bijur; Bedell Harned	No pewter medals awarded	
1929	New York City	Dorothy Weld; Richard Hapgood	Ethel Bijur; Bedell Harned	No other competitors		
1930	Providence	Helen Herbst; William Nagle	Virginia Martin; Ferrier Martin	Dorothea Sanders; Heaton Robertson	No pewter medals awarded	
1931	Boston	Nancy Follett; Fred Parmenter	Ethel Bijur; Bedell Harned	Gertrude Dutton; Harold Hartshorne	No pewter medals awarded	
1932	New York City	Virginia Martin; Ferrier Martin	Miriam Davenport; Howard Davenport	Gertrude Dutton; Harold Hartshorne	No pewter medals awarded	
1933	New Haven	Eva Schwerdt; William Bruns Jr.	Polly Blodgett; Bernard Fox	Jane Nicholson; E.A. Hellmund	No pewter medals awarded	
1934	Philadelphia	Polly Blodgett; Roger Turner	Jeanne Schulte; Ollie Haupt Jr.	Mrs. R. English; Mr. L. Fogassey	No pewter medals awarded	
1935	New Haven	Jeanne Schulte; Ollie Haupt Jr.	Mrs. R. English; Mr. L. Fogassey	Marjorie Parker; Howard Meredith	No pewter medals awarded	
1936	New York City	Joan Tozzer; Bernard Fox	Marjorie Parker; Howard Meredith	Mrs. Arthur Preusch; Arthur Preusch	No pewter medals awarded	
1937	Chicago	Ardelle Kloss; Roland Janson	Helen Barrett; Ted Harper	Marjorie Parker; Howard Meredith	No pewter medals awarded	
1938	Philadelphia	Annah Hall; William Penn-Gaskell Hall III	Ruth English; Louis Pitts	Angeline Knapp; J.N. Pike	No pewter medals awarded	
1939	Saint Paul	Betty Lee Bennett; John Kinney	Ruth English; Louis Pitts	Nettie Prantel; George Boltres	No pewter medals awarded	
1940	Cleveland	Dorothy Glazier; Stephen Tanner	Nettie Prantel; George Boltres	Jean Matzke; Robert Matzke	No pewter medals awarded	
1941	Boston	Doris Schubach; Walter Noffke	Dorothy Goos; Edward LeMaire	Joanne Frazier; James Greene	No pewter medals awarded	
1942	Chicago	Dorothy Goos; Edward LeMaire	Donna Pospisil; Jean-Pierre Brunet	Karol Kennedy; Peter Kennedy	No pewter medals awarded	
1943	New York City	Betty Schalow; Arthur Preusch Jr.	Ruth Flint; Lyman Wakefield Jr.	Karol Kennedy; Peter Kennedy	No pewter medals awarded	
1944	Minneapolis	Donna Pospisil; Jean-Pierre Brunet	Karol Kennedy; Peter Kennedy	Sally Blair; Huntington Blair	No pewter medals awarded	
1945	New York City	Betty Jean Higgins; Lyman Wakefield Jr.	Yvonne Sherman; Robert Swenning	Karol Kennedy; Peter Kennedy	No pewter medals awarded	
1946	Chicago	Yvonne Sherman; Robert Swenning	Harriet Sutton; John Lettengarver	Barbara De Julio; Herman Maricich	No pewter medals awarded	
1947	Berkeley	Harriet Sutton; John Lettengarver	Anne Davies; Carleton Hoffner Jr.	Marilyn McDonald; Harlan Bennett	No pewter medals awarded	
1948	Colorado Springs	Anne Davies; Carleton Hoffner Jr.	Anne Hall; James Philips	Jane Schellentrager; Riki Bliss	No pewter medals awarded	
1949	Colorado Springs	Lois Waring; Walter Bainbridge Jr.	Janet Gerhauser; John Nightingale	Mary Louisa Haas; Jack Woodstrom	No pewter medals awarded	
1950	Washington, D.C.	Janet Gerhauser; John Nightingale	Caryl Johns; Jack Jost	Beverly Young; Robert Keyes	No pewter medals awarded	
1951	Seattle	Caryl Johns; Jack Jost	Barbara Ziem; Armando Rodriguez	Lucille Ash; Carl Chamberlin	No pewter medals awarded	
1952	Colorado Springs	Sharon Choate; Richard Bromley	Barbara Davis; William Lemmon	Patsy Ann Buck; Martin Coonan	No pewter medals awarded	
1953	Hershey	Norma McCullagh; Robert Goodfellow Jr.	Mary Kay Keller; Richard Keller	Susan Sebo; Lee Carroll Owen	No pewter medals awarded	
1954	Los Angeles	Dawn May; David Hertz	Sandra Hardin; James Barlow	Joan Zamboni; Charles Coulon	No pewter medals awarded	
1955	Colorado Springs	Maribel Owen; Charles Foster	Patricia Kilgore; James Barlow	Mary Kay Keller; Richard Keller	No pewter medals awarded	
1956	Philadelphia	Nancy Rouillard; Ronald Ludington	Mary Kay Keller; Richard Keller	Sharon Constable; John Hertz	No pewter medals awarded	
1957	Berkeley	Ila Ray Hadley; Ray Hadley Jr.	Sharon Constable; John Hertz	Margaret Jurmo; Roy Pringle	No pewter medals awarded	
1958	Minneapolis	Gayle Freed; Karl Freed	Mary Lou Raymond; Jack Nankervis	Judianne Fotheringill; Jerry Fotheringill	No pewter medals awarded	
1959	Rochester	Judianne Fotheringill; Jerry Fotheringill	Gail Kizer; Lonnie Kane	Laurie Hickox; William Hickox	No pewter medals awarded	
1960	Seattle	Laurie Hickox; William Hickox	Vivian Joseph; Ronald Joseph	Mary McGrath; Jeff Flowers	No pewter medals awarded	
1961	Colorado Springs	Vivian Joseph; Ronald Joseph	Dorothyann Nelson; Pieter Kollen	Irma Staro; Richard Callaghan	No pewter medals awarded	
1962	Boston	Elizabeth George; Paul George	Cynthia Kauffman; Ronald Kauffman	Joanne Heckert; Gary Clark	No pewter medals awarded	
1963	Long Beach	Cynthia Kauffman; Ronald Kauffman	Yvonne Littlefield; Peter Betts	Joanne Heckert; Gary Clark	No pewter medals awarded	
1964	Cleveland	Barbara Yaggi; Gene Floyd	Barbara Hartwig; Bobby Mecay	Dianne Boucas; Roger Collard	No pewter medals awarded	
1965	Lake Placid	Page Paulsen; Larry Dusich	Susan Berens; Roy Wagelein	Betty Lewis; Richard Gilbert	No pewter medals awarded	
1966	Berkeley	Betty Jean Lewis; Richard Gilbert	Sandi Sweitzer; Jerry Entwistle	JoJo Starbuck; Kenneth Shelley	No pewter medals awarded	
1967	Omaha	JoJo Starbuck; Kenneth Shelley	Kaite Walker; James Disbrow	Michelle Viaux; Roger Collard	No pewter medals awarded	
1968	Philadelphia	Tisha Baird; Richard Inglesi	Jill Ritchie; Ralph Meredith	Melissa Militano; Mark Militano	No pewter medals awarded	
1969	Seattle	Jannat Thompson; John Baldwin	Kathy Normile; Gregory Taylor	Barbara Brown; Doug Berndt	No pewter medals awarded	
1970	Tulsa	Barbara Brown; Doug Berndt	Laurie Brandel; James Hulick	Cathy Mishkin; Donald Bonacci	No pewter medals awarded	
1971	Buffalo	Cynthia Van Valkenburg; James Hulick	Gale Fuhrman; Joel Fuhrman	Michelle McCladdie; Richard Ewell	No pewter medals awarded	
1972	Long Beach	Michelle McCladdie; Richard Ewell III	Suki Hoagland; Mike Sahlin	Georgia Truffini; Bill McPike	No pewter medals awarded	
1973	Minneapolis	Tai Babilonia; Randy Gardner	Patty Morton; William Fauver	Erika Susman; Tom Huff	No pewter medals awarded	
1974	Providence	Lisa Carey; Douglas Varvais	Sheryl Franks; Mike Botticelli	Rebecca Loghrey; Mike Chaplin	No pewter medals awarded	
1975	Oakland	Lorene Mitchell; Donald Mitchell	Lori Mills; David Kirby	Lyndy Marron; Hal Marron	No pewter medals awarded	
1976	Colorado Springs	Tracy Prussack; Scott Prussack	Dana Reisman; Ed Reisman	Danelle Porter; John Maddison	No pewter medals awarded	
1977	Hartford	Vicki Heasley; Robert Wagenhoffer	Maria DiDomenico; Larry Schrier	Mary Lou Robinson; Ray Belmonte	No pewter medals awarded	
1978	Portland	Maria DiDomenico; Larry Schrier	Beth Flora; Ken Flora	Leanne LaBrake; Jeffrey LaBrake	No pewter medals awarded	
1979	Cincinnati	Rosemary Sweeney; Daniel Salera	Danielle Porter; Burt Lancon	Elizabeth Chabot; Peter Oppegard	No pewter medals awarded	
1980	Atlanta	Dana Graham; Paul Wylie	Deborah Lynch; Keith Green	Maryan Amaral; Bryan Amaral	No pewter medals awarded	
1981	San Diego	Deborah Lynch; Keith Green	Cara Gill; Craig Gill	Natalie Seybold; Wayne Seybold	No pewter medals awarded	
1982	Indianapolis	Natalie Seybold; Wayne Seybold	Susan Dungjen; Jason Dungjen	Amy Lynn Grossman; Robert Davenport	No pewter medals awarded	
1983	Pittsburgh	Susan Dungjen; Jason Dungjen	Sandy Hurtubise; Karl Kurtz	Sue Falzone; Michael Blicharski	No pewter medals awarded	
1984	Salt Lake City	Ginger Tse; Archie Tse	Jeannine Jones; Tony Jones	Tammy Crowson; Joseph Mero	No pewter medals awarded	
1985	Kansas City	Deveny Deck; Luke Hohmann	Shelly Propson; Jerod Swallow	Lori Blasko; Todd Sand	No pewter medals awarded	
1986	Uniondale	Kristi Yamaguchi; Rudy Galindo	Ashley Stevenson; Scott Wendland	Shanda Smith; Brandon Smith	No pewter medals awarded	
1987	Tacoma	Kellie Lynn Creel; David McGoveran	Michelle Laughlin; Mark Naylor	Julianne Thompson; Brian Geddeis	No pewter medals awarded	
1988	Denver	Kenna Bailey; John Denton	Jennifer Heurlin; John Frederiksen	Natasha Kuchiki; Richard Alexander	Paula Visingardi; Jeb Rand	
1989	Baltimore	Jennifer Heurlin; John Frederiksen	Natasha Kuchiki; Richard Alexander	Anne-Marie Wells; Brian Wells	Angela Deneweth; John Liotta	
1990	Salt Lake City	Tristan Vega; Richard Alexander	Susan Ann Purdy; Scott Chiamulera	Aimee Offner; Brian Helgenberg	Kara Paxton; Brad Cox	
1991	Minneapolis	Aimee Offner; Brian Helgenberg	Cambria Goodman; Steven Moore	Kara Paxton; Brad Cox	Nicole Sciarrotta; Gregory Sciarrotta	
1992	Orlando	Nicole Sciarrotta; Gregory Sciarrotta	Dawn Piepenbrink; Nick Castaneda	Robin Heckler; Jeff Tilley	Andrea Catoia; Paul Dulebohn	
1993	Phoenix	Stephanie Stiegler; Lance Travis	Robin Heckler; Jeff Tilley	Liberte Sheldon; Russ Scott	Cheryl Marker; Todd Price	
1994	Detroit	Nicole Bateson-Rock; Keith Tindall	Cheryl Marker; Todd Price	Sara Ward; J. Paul Binnebose	Danielle Hartsell; Steve Hartsell	
1995	Providence	Danielle Hartsell; Steve Hartsell	Erin Elbe; Jeffrey Weiss	Nicole Perry; Paul Dulebohn	Melanie Lambert; Fred Palascak	
1996	San Jose	Natalie Vlandis; Jered Guzman	Naomi Grabow; Benjamin Oberman	Jacki Davidson; J. Paul Binnebose	Tiffany Stiegler; Johnnie Stiegler	
1997	Nashville	Tiffany Stiegler; Johnnie Stiegler	Katie Barnhart; Charles Bernard	Tiffany Scott; Philip Dulebohn	Laura Handy; James Peterson	
1998	Philadelphia	Heather Allebach; Matt Evers	Jaisa MacAdam; Garrett Lucash	Larisa Spielberg; Craig Joeright	Tiffany Sfikas; Josiah Modes	
1999	Salt Lake City	Sima Ganaba; Amir Ganaba	Jaisa MacAdam; Garrett Lucash	Megan Sierk; Dustin Sierk	Katie Gadkowski; Derek Trent	
2000	Cleveland	Stephanie Kalesavich; Aaron Parchem	Sima Ganaba; Amir Ganaba	Jessica Waldstein; Garrett Lucash	Megan Sierk; Dustin Sierk	
2001	Boston	Deborah Blinder; Jeremy Allen	Kristen Roth; Michael McPherson	Brandilyn Sandoval; Derek Trent	Christen Dean; Joshua Murphy	
2002	Los Angeles	Colette Appel; Lee Harris	Janice Mayne; Josh Martin	Tiffany Vise; Laureano Ibarra	Christie Baca; Scott Smith	
2003	Dallas	Amy Howerton; Steven Pottenger	Brittany Vise; Nicholas Kole	Colette Appel; Lee Harris	Chelsea Meador; Josh Martin	
2004	Atlanta	Shantel Jordan; Jeremy Barrett	Brooke Castile; Benjamin Okolski	Andrea Varraux; David Pelletier	Sydney Schmidt; Christopher Pottenger	
2005	Portland	Mariel Miller; Rockne Brubaker	Julia Vlassov; Drew Meekins	Chloé Katz; Joseph Lynch	Keauna McLaughlin; Ethan Burgess	
2006	St. Louis	Kendra Moyle; Andy Seitz	Bridget Namiotka; John Coughlin	Julia Vlassov; Drew Meekins	Kaela Pflumm; Christopher Pottenger	
2007	Spokane	Keauna McLaughlin; Rockne Brubaker	Bianca Butler; Joseph Jacobsen	Jessica Rose Paetsch; Jon Nuss	Kaela Pflumm; Christopher Pottenger	
2008	Saint Paul	Jessica Rose Paetsch; Jon Nuss	Tracy Tanovich; Michael Chau	Chelsi Guillen; Danny Curzon	Andrea Best; Trevor Young	
2009	Cleveland	Tracy Tanovich; Michael Chau	Brynn Carman; Chris Knierim	Marissa Castelli; Simon Shnapir	Britney Simpson; Nathan Miller	
2010	Spokane	Felicia Zhang; Taylor Toth	Britney Simpson; Nathan Miller	Erika Smith; Nathan Bartholomay	Carolyn-Ann Alba; Chris Knierim	
2011	Greensboro	Ashley Cain; Joshua Reagan	Andrea Poapst; Chris Knierim	Cassie Andrews; Timothy LeDuc	Brynn Carman; A.J. Reiss	
2012	San Jose	Haven Denney; Brandon Frazier	Britney Simpson; Matthew Blackmer	Kylie Duarte; Colin Grafton	Jessica Calalang; Zack Sidhu	
2013	Omaha	Britney Simpson; Matthew Blackmer	Jessica Calalang; Zack Sidhu	Madeline Aaron; Max Settlage	Chelsea Liu; Devin Perini	
2014	Boston	Madeline Aaron; Max Settlage	Chelsea Liu; Devin Perini	AnnaMarie Pearce; Jason Pacini	Elise Middleton; Anthony Evans	
2015	Greensboro	Caitlin Fields; Ernie Utah Stevens	Chelsea Liu; Brian Johnson	Olivia Allan; Austin Hale	Lindsay Weinstein; Jacob Simon	
2016	Saint Paul	Joy Weinberg; Maximiliano Fernandez	Lindsay Weinstein; Jacob Simon	Meiryla Findley; Austin Hale	Madeleine Gallagher; Justin Highgate-Brutman	
2017	Kansas City	Nica Digerness; Danny Neudecker	Elli Kopmar; Jonah Barrett	Alexandria Yao; Austin Hale	Lindsay Weinstein; Jacob Simon	
2018	San Jose	Audrey Lu; Misha Mitrofanov	Sarah Feng; TJ Nyman	Laiken Lockley; Keenan Prochnow	Nadine Wang; Spencer Akira Howe	
2019	Detroit	Laiken Lockley; Keenan Prochnow	Kate Finster; Balázs Nagy	Isabelle Martins; Ryan Bedard	Maria Mokhova; Ivan Mokhov	
2020	Greensboro	Kate Finster; Balázs Nagy	Anastasiia Smirnova; Danil Siianytsia	Winter Deardorff; Mikhail Johnson	Cate Fleming; Jedidiah Isbell	
2021	Las Vegas	Anastasiia Smirnova; Danil Siianytsia	Isabelle Martins; Ryan Bedard	Valentina Plazas; Maximiliano Fernandez	Catherine Rivers; Timmy Chapman	
2022	Nashville	Sonia Baram; Daniel Tioumentsev	Isabelle Martins; Ryan Bedard	Catherine Rivers; Timmy Chapman	Megan Wessenberg; Blake Eisenbach	
2023	San Jose	Ellie Korytek; Timmy Chapman	Naomi Williams; Lachlan Lewer	Lilianna Murray; Jordan Gillette	Olivia Flores; Luke Wang	
2024	Columbus	Olivia Flores; Luke Wang	Naomi Williams; Lachlan Lewer	Sydney Cooke; Matthew Kennedy	Adele Zheng; Andy Deng	
2025	Wichita	Reagan Moss; Jakub Galbavy	Olivia Flores; Luke Wang	Saya Carpenter; Jon Maravilla	Sofia Jarmoc; Luke Witkowski	
2026	St. Louis	Reagan Moss; Jakub Galbavy	Sofia Jarmoc; Luke Witkowski	Milada Kovar; Jared McPike	Alena Kerr; Sam Herbert	

=== Ice dance ===
Junior ice dance event medalists
Year	Location	Gold	Silver	Bronze	Pewter	Ref.
1943	New York City	Dorothy Glazier; Lyman Wakefield Jr.	Nancy Blair; Michael McGean	Kathe Mehl; Allen Van Alstyne	No pewter medals awarded	
1944	Minneapolis	Marilyn Grace; William Hoyt	Nancy Blair; Michael McGean	Elisabeth Daub; William Hickok	No pewter medals awarded	
1945	New York City	Patsy Jones; Walter Bainbridge Jr.	Yvonne Cameron; Dean Cameron	Vivian Halliday; Richard Queisser	No pewter medals awarded	
1946	Chicago	Vivian Queisser; Richard Queisser	Vera Halliday; E. Tefft Barker	Camilla Cliff; Sidney Moore	No pewter medals awarded	
1947	Berkeley	Renee Stein; Sidney Moore	Nancy Miller; Donald Laws	Irene Maguire; Walter Muehlbronner	No pewter medals awarded	
1948	Colorado Springs	Mary Firth; Donald Laws	Vera Halliday; Edward Picken	Jean Coulter; Charles Brinkman II	No pewter medals awarded	
1949	Colorado Springs	Vera Ruth Elliott; Rex Cook	Vera Halliday; Edward Picken	Carol Ann Peters; Daniel Ryan	No pewter medals awarded	
1950	Washington, D.C.	Carol Ann Peters; Daniel Ryan	Caryl Johns; Jack Jost	Vera Halliday; Edward Picken	No pewter medals awarded	
1951	Seattle	Caryl Johns; Jack Jost	Terryl Johnson; Gerald Woodstrom	Jane Holmes; Carl Chamberlin	No pewter medals awarded	
1952	Colorado Springs	Elizabeth Chambers; Roger Chambers Jr.	Katrine Neil; William Neil	Kristina Hunting; Thomas Sherritt	No pewter medals awarded	
1953	Hershey	Katrine Neil; William Neil Jr.	Sidney Ann Foster; Franklin Nelson	Rose Mary Lyons; Joseph Nowack	No pewter medals awarded	
1954	Los Angeles	Sidney Ann Foster; Franklin Nelson	Joan Zamboni; Charles Coulon	Barbara Stein; Ray Sato	No pewter medals awarded	
1955	Colorado Springs	Barbara Stein; Ray Sato	Jacqueline Holm; Bert Wright	Charlene Adams; Lee Carroll Owen	No pewter medals awarded	
1956	Philadelphia	Aileen Kahre; Charles Phillips Jr.	Claire O'Neill; John Bejshak Jr.	Barbara Ann Roles; James Short	No pewter medals awarded	
1957	Berkeley	Claire O'Neill; John Bejshak Jr.	Margie Ackles; Howie Harrold	Gail Kizer; John E. Allen	No pewter medals awarded	
1958	Minneapolis	Judy Ann Lamar; Ronald Ludington	Barbara Ann Roles; James Short	Marilyn Meeker; Larry Pierce	No pewter medals awarded	
1959	Rochester	Marilyn Meeker; Larry Pierce	Diane Sherbloom; Roger Campbell	Patricia Dineen; Robert Dineen	No pewter medals awarded	
1960	Seattle	Patricia Dineen; Robert Dineen	Ila Ray Hadley; Ray Hadley Jr.	Dorothyann Nelson; Pieter Kollen	No pewter medals awarded	
1961	Colorado Springs	Rosemary McEvoy; Ralph Owen	Ila Ray Hadley; Ray Hadley Jr.	Dorothyann Nelson; Pieter Kollen	No pewter medals awarded	
1962	Boston	Susan Bright; Robert Munz	Carole MacSween; Raymond Chenson	Peggy Eastman; Richard Hirsch	No pewter medals awarded	
1963	Long Beach	Carole MacSween; Raymond Chenson	Darlene Streich; Charles Fetter Jr.	Sally Crook; Edward Smith Jr.	No pewter medals awarded	
1964	Cleveland	Kristin Fortune; Claude Sweet	Dale Lynne; Russell Bowen	Sandra Schwomeyer; James Pennington	No pewter medals awarded	
1965	Lake Placid	Kathy Flaherty; Roger Berry	Sandra Schwomeyer; James Pennington	Dolly Rodenbaugh; Thomas Lescinski	No pewter medals awarded	
1966	Berkeley	Dolly Rodenbaugh; Thomas Lescinski	Barrett Brown; Gary Palmer	Suzanne Gillespie; John Bickel	No pewter medals awarded	
1967	Omaha	Debbi Gerken; Keith Galgot	Susan Roberts; Bill Roberts	Caren Cady; Warren Danner	No pewter medals awarded	
1968	Philadelphia	Joan Bitterman; Brad Hislop	Margaret Millier; Don Bachlott	Caren Cady; Danny Danner	No pewter medals awarded	
1969	Seattle	Candace Johnstone; Bruce Bowland	Paula Stolbach; Richard Stolbach	Carol Paulsen; Jerry Leonard	No pewter medals awarded	
1970	Tulsa	Mary Bonacci; Gerard Lane	Jane Pankey; Richard Horne	Cathleen Casey; Francis Cassella	No pewter medals awarded	
1971	Buffalo	Cathleen Casey; Francis Cassella	Myra Chrien; David Chrien	Beatrice Sexton; James Thorn	No pewter medals awarded	
1972	Long Beach	Michelle Ford; Glenn Parriott	Shareen Finley; Curt Finley	Andrea Peterson; Guy Sexton	No pewter medals awarded	
1973	Minneapolis	Judi Genovesi; Kent Weigle	Jennifer Young; David Young	Joy Cushner; Stephen Kanter	No pewter medals awarded	
1974	Providence	Jennifer Young; David Young	Deborah Mansfield; Frederick Maynard III	Carolyn Fortuna; Robert Mock	No pewter medals awarded	
1975	Oakland	Deborah Mansfield; Frederick Maynard III	Jo Ann Schneider; Richard Griffin	Carol Fox; Richard Dalley	No pewter medals awarded	
1976	Colorado Springs	Bonnie Burton; William Burton	Carol Fox; Richard Dalley	Kim Krohn; Barry Hagan	No pewter medals awarded	
1977	Hartford	Kelly Morris; Michael Seibert	Felicia DiGiusto; Donald Adair	Sue Park; Patrick Shannon	No pewter medals awarded	
1978	Portland	Judy Ferris; Scott Gregory	Becky Lee Baker; Rick Berg	Judy Blumberg; Robert Engler	No pewter medals awarded	
1979	Cincinnati	Elisa Spitz; Stanley Makman	Renée Roca; Andrew Ouellette	Robi Shepard; Kelly Witt	No pewter medals awarded	
1980	Atlanta	Terri Slater; David Lipowitz	Diana Georgeou; Ari Lieb	Janice Kindrachuk; Blake Hobson	No pewter medals awarded	
1981	San Diego	Anne Spiewak; Keith Lichtman	Susan Wynne; Joseph Druar	Kelleigh Perot; Ralph Ball	No pewter medals awarded	
1982	Indianapolis	Amanda Newman; Jerry Santoferrara	Lynda Malek; Alexander Miller	Kristan Lowery; Chip Rossbach	No pewter medals awarded	
1983	Pittsburgh	Suzanne Semanick; Alexander Miller	Kandi Amelon; Alec Binnie	Colleen McGuire; William Lyons III	No pewter medals awarded	
1984	Salt Lake City	Christina Yatsuhashi; Keith Yatsuhashi	April Sargent; John D'Amelio	Dorothy Rodek; Robert Nordozza	No pewter medals awarded	
1985	Kansas City	Jodie Balogh; Jerod Swallow	Tonia Kleinsasser; Daniel Stahl	Jill Helser; Michael Verlich	No pewter medals awarded	
1986	Uniondale	Colette Huber; Ron Kravette	Lisa Grove; Charles Sinek	Kimberly Barget; James Schilling	No pewter medals awarded	
1987	Tacoma	Jennifer Benz; Jeffrey Benz	Ann-Morton Neale; Dee Pascoe	Amy Webster; John Millier	No pewter medals awarded	
1988	Denver	Elizabeth Punsalan; Shawn Rettstatt	Tiffany Veltre; Duane Greenleaf	Jennifer Goolsbee; Peter Chupa	Rachel Mayer; Peter Breen	
1989	Baltimore	Rachel Mayer; Peter Breen	Wendy Millette; James Curtis	Jeannine Jones; Michael Shroge	Ann-Morton Neale; Laurance Shaffer	
1990	Salt Lake City	Beth Buhl; Neale Smull	Krista Schulz; Jonathan Stine	Rachel Lane; Eric Meier	Cheryl Demkowski; Jeff Czarnecki	
1991	Minneapolis	Kimberly Callahan; Robert Peal	Rachel Lane; Eric Meier	Michelle Maier; Tony Darnell	Jennifer Nieman; Jonathan Stine	
1992	Orlando	Christine Fowler; Garrett Swasey	Cheryl Demkowski; Sean Gales	Kimberley Hartley; Michael Sklutovsky	Rachel Lane; Tony Darnell	
1993	Phoenix	Kimberley Hartley; Michael Sklutovsky	Christina Fitzgerald; Mark Fitzgerald	Tiffani Tucker; Frank Singley	Carissa Green; Greg Maddalone	
1994	Detroit	Laura Gayton; Oleg Fediukov	Carissa Green; Greg Maddalone	Eve Chalom; Mathew Gates	Nicole Dumonceaux; John Repucci	
1995	Providence	Eve Chalom; Mathew Gates	Kristina Feliciano; Alex Jacoby	Jessica Joseph; Charles Butler	Dawn Ponte; Paul Frey	
1996	San Jose	Jessica Joseph; Charles Butler	Naomi Lang; John Lee	Tami Tyler; Jonathan Nichols	Azumi Sagara; Jonathan Magalnick	
1997	Nashville	Jessica Joseph; Charles Butler	Kerrie O'Donnell; Brandon Forsyth	Jamie Silverstein; Justin Pekarek	Melissa Gregory; James Shuford	
1998	Philadelphia	Melissa Gregory; James Shuford	Jamie Silverstein; Justin Pekarek	Crystal Beckerdite; Raphael Kelling	Cerise Henzes; Walter Lang	
1999	Salt Lake City	Jamie Silverstein; Justin Pekarek	Emilie Nussear; Brandon Forsyth	Crystal Lynn Beckerdite; Matt Healy	Alison Newman; Michel Klus	
2000	Cleveland	Tanith Belbin; Benjamin Agosto	Emilie Nussear; Brandon Forsyth	Jesica Valentine; Matthew Kossack	Lia Nitake; Ryan O'Meara	
2001	Boston	Lydia Manon; Michel Klus	Kendra Goodwin; Chris Obzansky	Kakani Young; Ikaika Young	Melissa Ralph; Ryan O'Meara	
2002	Los Angeles	Loren Galler-Rabinowitz; David Mitchell	Melissa Ralph; Ryan O'Meara	Kendra Goodwin; Chris Obzansky	Kirsten Frisch; Brent Bommentre	
2003	Dallas	Morgan Matthews; Maxim Zavozin	Kirsten Frisch; Brent Bommentre	Flo Steed; Augie Hill	Carly Donowick; Leo Ungar	
2004	Atlanta	Morgan Matthews; Maxim Zavozin	Meryl Davis; Charlie White	Trina Pratt; Todd Gilles	Kirsten Frisch; Augie Hill	
2005	Portland	Trina Pratt; Todd Gilles	Caitlin Mallory; Brent Holdburg	Kimmerly Lauten; Augie Hill	Meghan McCullough; Joel Dear	
2006	St. Louis	Meryl Davis; Charlie White	Emily Samuelson; Evan Bates	Jane Summersett; Elliot Pennington	Kaitlyn Weaver; Charles Clavey	
2007	Spokane	Emily Samuelson; Evan Bates	Madison Hubbell; Keiffer Hubbell	Lynn Kriengkrairut; Logan Giulietti-Schmitt	Piper Gilles; Timothy McKernan	
2008	Saint Paul	Madison Hubbell; Keiffer Hubbell	Piper Gilles; Timothy McKernan	Madison Chock; Greg Zuerlein	Maia Shibutani; Alex Shibutani	
2009	Cleveland	Madison Chock; Greg Zuerlein	Maia Shibutani; Alex Shibutani	Piper Gilles; Zachary Donohue	Shannon Wingle; Timothy McKernan	
2010	Spokane	Maia Shibutani; Alex Shibutani	Rachel Tibbetts; Collin Brubaker	Piper Gilles; Zachary Donohue	Isabella Cannuscio; Ian Lorello	
2011	Greensboro	Charlotte Lichtman; Dean Copely	Lauri Bonacorsi; Travis Mager	Anastasia Cannuscio; Colin McManus	Anastasia Olson; Jordan Cowan	
2012	San Jose	Alexandra Aldridge; Daniel Eaton	Lauri Bonacorsi; Travis Mager	Lorraine McNamara; Quinn Carpenter	Rachel Parsons; Michael Parsons	
2013	Omaha	Alexandra Aldridge; Daniel Eaton	Kaitlin Hawayek; Jean-Luc Baker	Lorraine McNamara; Quinn Carpenter	Holly Moore; Daniel Klaber	
2014	Boston	Kaitlin Hawayek; Jean-Luc Baker	Lorraine McNamara; Quinn Carpenter	Rachel Parsons; Michael Parsons	Holly Moore; Daniel Klaber	
2015	Greensboro	Lorraine McNamara; Quinn Carpenter	Rachel Parsons; Michael Parsons	Elliana Pogrebinsky; Alex Benoit	Holly Moore; Daniel Klaber	
2016	Saint Paul	Lorraine McNamara; Quinn Carpenter	Rachel Parsons; Michael Parsons	Elliana Pogrebinsky; Alex Benoit	Christina Carreira; Anthony Ponomarenko	
2017	Kansas City	Rachel Parsons; Michael Parsons	Christina Carreira; Anthony Ponomarenko	Lorraine McNamara; Quinn Carpenter	Chloe Lewis; Logan Bye	
2018	San Jose	Christina Carreira; Anthony Ponomarenko	Caroline Green; Gordon Green	Chloe Lewis; Logan Bye	Eliana Gropman; Ian Somerville	
2019	Detroit	Caroline Green; Gordon Green	Avonley Nguyen; Vadym Kolesnik	Eliana Gropman; Ian Somerville	Oona Brown; Gage Brown	
2020	Greensboro	Avonley Nguyen; Vadym Kolesnik	Katarina Wolfkostin; Jeffrey Chen	Oona Brown; Gage Brown	Molly Cesanek; Yehor Yehorov	
2021	Las Vegas	Katarina Wolfkostin; Jeffrey Chen	Oona Brown; Gage Brown	Katarina DelCamp; Ian Somerville	Isabella Flores; Dimitry Tsarevski	
2022	Nashville	Leah Neset; Artem Markelov	Angela Ling; Caleb Wein	Elianna Peal; Ethan Peal	Vanessa Pham; Jonathan Rogers	
2023	San Jose	Leah Neset; Artem Markelov	Helena Carhart; Volodymyr Horovyi	Jenna Hauer; Benjamin Starr	Elianna Peal; Ethan Peal	
2024	Columbus	Leah Neset; Artem Markelov	Yahli Pedersen; Jeffrey Chen	Elianna Peal; Ethan Peal	Jenna Hauer; Benjamin Starr	
2025	Wichita	Hana Maria Aboian; Daniil Veselukhin	Elianna Peal; Ethan Peal	Caroline Mullen; Brendan Mullen	Michelle Deych; Ryan Hu	
2026	St. Louis	Hana Maria Aboian; Daniil Veselukhin	Jasmine Robertson; Chase Rohner	Jane Calhoun; Mark Zheltyshev	Aneta Vaclavikova; William Lissauer	

== Compulsory figures ==
Competitions in compulsory figures were held for the last time at the 1999 U.S. Championships in Salt Lake City.

=== Men's figures ===
Junior men's figures event medalists
Year	Location	Gold	Silver	Bronze	Pewter	Ref.
1991	Minneapolis	Laurent Massé	Mark Drouillard	Scott Tonidandel	Vearle Klinger	
1992	Orlando	Jay Cochon	Mark Drouillard	Jeffrey Adler	Eddie Gornik	
1993	Phoenix	Everett Weiss	Jeffrey Adler	Shaun Ditmar	Anthony Chicalace	
1994	Detroit	Erik Schulz	Anthony Chicalace	John Wright	Ryan Jahnke	
1995	Providence	Christopher Malato	Colin Bennett	Michael Keller	Jonathan Lawrence	
1996	San Jose	Lloyd Sarbacker	Colin Bennett	Robert Shmalo	Christopher Mattern	
1997	Nashville	Scott Sarbacker	Christopher Mattern	Colin Bennett	Scott Sheets	

=== Women's figures ===
Junior women's figures event medalists
Year	Location	Gold	Silver	Bronze	Pewter	Ref.
1991	Minneapolis	Casey Link	Caroline Murray	Jennifer Blount	Sabrina Vora	
1992	Orlando	Jessica Posada	Jennifer Carlson	Kristin Knotts	Sara Brock	
1993	Phoenix	Leah Hardy	Shirley Pang	Melanie Dupon	Sarah Ohlmiller	
1994	Detroit	Jennifer Clark	Karlene Marie Machovec	Cassy Papajohn	Theresa Cho	
1995	Providence	Jamie Wunderlich	Lyndsey Read	Kristen Varney	Jennifer Rickard	
1996	San Jose	Evelynn Raphael	Elizabeth Handley	Cammi Bruns	Mya Rose Zapata	
1997	Nashville	Cammi Bruns	Emily Best	Jessica Vieth	Heather Lee	
1998	Philadelphia	Kharen Kloeffer & Brooke Pitman (tied)	No silver medals awarded	Josselyn Baumgartner	Alecia Moore	
1999	Salt Lake City	Jessica Koslow & Erin White (tied)	No silver medals awarded	Lindsey Westbrook	Kristin Griffitts	
