= 1975 U.S. Figure Skating Championships =

Figure skating competition

1975 US Figure Skating Championships
- Type: National Championship
- Date: January 29 – February 1
- Season: 1974-75
- Location: Oakland, California
- Venue: St. Moritz ISC

Champions
- Men's singles: Gordon McKellen (Senior); Tim Zink (Junior)
- Women's singles: Dorothy Hamill (Senior); Lisa-Marie Allen (Junior)
- Pairs: Melissa Militano and Johnny Johns (Senior); Lorene Mitchell and Donald Mitchell (Junior)
- Ice dance: Colleen O'Connor and Jim Millns (Senior); Deborah Mansfield and Frederick Maynard (Junior)
- Previous: 1974 U.S. Championships
- Next: 1976 U.S. Championships

The 1975 U.S. Figure Skating Championships were held from January 29-February 1 at the St. Moritz ISC in Oakland, California. Gold, silver, and bronze medals were awarded in four disciplines – men's singles, women's singles, pair skating, and ice dancing – across three levels: senior, junior, and novice.

The event determined the U.S. teams for the 1975 World Figure Skating Championships.

== Senior results ==
=== Men ===
Rank	Name
1	Gordon McKellen
2	Terry Kubicka
3	Charles Tickner
4	Ken Newfield
5	David Santee
6	John Carlow, Jr.
7	Scott Cramer
8	Randy Gardner
9	Mahlon Bradley
10	Scott Henderson
11	Billy Schneider
12	Ronnie Green

=== Women ===
Rank	Name
1	Dorothy Hamill
2	Wendy Burge
3	Kath Malmberg
4	Barbie Smith
5	Priscilla Hill
6	Juli McKinstry
7	Linda Fratianne
8	Barbara Salomon
9	Teri Klindworth
10	Karen DeAngelo
11	Paula Larson
12	Ingrid Blomstrom

=== Pairs ===
Rank	Name
1	Melissa Militano / Johnny Johns
2	Tai Babilonia / Randy Gardner
3	Emily Benenson / Jack Courtney
4	Erica Susman / Thomas Huff
5	Alice Cook / Bill Fauver
6	Gale Fuhrman / Joel Fuhrman
7	Sheryl Franks / Mike Botticelli
8	Lisa Carey / Douglas Varvais
9	Gail Hamula / Phillipp Grout
10	Beth Sweiding / Frank Sweiding
11	Judy Ferris / Kirk Wyse

=== Ice dancing (Gold dance) ===
Rank	Name
1	Colleen O'Connor / Jim Millns
2	Judi Genovesi / Kent Weigle
3	Michelle Ford / Glenn Patterson
4	Ann Millier / Skip Millier
5	Susan Kelley / Andrew Stroukoff
6	Debbie Ganson / Gerry Lane
7	Jackie Booth / Michael Podmore
8	Jennifer Vogel / David Siebert
9	Jennifer Young / Frank Recco
10	Cathy Macri / Tim Hodges
11	Sara Hill / Paul Steiner
12	Dee Oseroff / Craig Bond

== Junior results ==
=== Men ===
Rank	Name
1	Tim Zink
2	Perry Jewell
3	Scott Sherman
4	Richard Rigby
5	Scott Carson
6	Dave Kinser
7	Scott Hamilton
8	Hal Marron
9	William Woehrle

=== Women ===
Rank	Name
1	Lisa-Marie Allen
2	Jeanne Chapman
3	Leslie Glenn
4	Kathy Gelecinsky
5	Tammy Gambill
6	Robin Wagner
7	Jeanette Evans
8	Emily Wendell
9	Susan McLauthlin
10	Noelle Bjornson
11	Missy McCandless

=== Pairs ===
Rank	Name
1	Lorene Mitchell / Donald Mitchell
2	Lori Mills / David Kirby
3	Lyndy Marron / Hal Marron
4	Tracy Prussack / Scott Prussack
5	Allison Washer / Peter Oppegard
6	Holly Blunt / Bruce Hurd
7	Rebecca Loghry / Mike Chapin
8	Robyn Rock / Scott Henderson
9	Janet Van Camp / Gordon Black
10	Caitlin Carruthers / Peter Carruthers

=== Ice dancing (Silver dance) ===
Rank	Name
1	Deborah Mansfield / Frederick Maynard
2	Jo Ann Schneider / Richard Griffin
3	Carol Fox / Richard Dalley
4	Diana Runde / Kenneth Simler
5	Cathy Marron / Hal Marron
6	Bonnie Burton / William Burton
7	Carolyn Fortuna / Kevin Moran
8	Sharon Parker / Mickey McCann
9	Helen Zinn / Richard Murphy

== Sources ==
- "Nationals", Skating magazine, Apr 1975
