= 1971 U.S. Figure Skating Championships =

Figure skating competition

1971 US Figure Skating Championships
- Type: National Championship
- Date: January 27 – 31
- Season: 1970–71
- Location: Buffalo, New York
- Venue: Memorial Auditorium; Dann Memorial Rink (figures)
- Previous: 1970 U.S. Championships
- Next: 1972 U.S. Championships

The 1971 U.S. Figure Skating Championships was held in Buffalo, New York on January 27–31. The compulsory figure competitions were held at Dann Memorial Rink, while the free skating events were held at the Memorial Auditorium. Medals were awarded in three colors: gold (first), silver (second), and bronze (third) in four disciplines – men's singles, ladies' singles, pair skating, and ice dancing – across three levels: senior, junior, and novice.

The event determined the U.S. team for the 1971 World Championships.

In addition to Kenneth Shelley, this event was notable for the number of other skaters competing successfully in multiple disciplines. As well as placing second in senior pairs, Melissa Militano won the junior ladies' title, landing a rare triple toe loop as she had at the previous year's championships. Besides winning a bronze medal in ice dance with Mary Karen Campbell, Johnny Johns competed in senior pairs with another partner, and placed a very respectable 6th in the senior men's division. Sheri Thrapp competed in both senior ladies and senior pairs. Another unusual crossover was the junior pair team of Sheryl Trueman and Jack Courtney who had been World Champions in artistic roller skating in 1969—as a team in pair skating, and Courtney individually in men's single skating. This was their first season of competition on the ice.

== Senior results ==
=== Men ===
The men's title was vacant due to the retirement of 1970 champion Tim Wood. The title was won by John Misha Petkevich, while Ken Shelley (pulling double duty by competing in singles as well as pairs) took the silver and young Gordon McKellen placed third.

Rank	Name
1	John Misha Petkevich
2	Kenneth Shelley
3	Gordon McKellen
4	James Demogines
5	Roger Bradshaw
6	Johnny Johns
7	Jeffrey Hall
8	Mark Rehfield
9	Dean Hiltzik
10	Charles Tickner
11	Gilbert Sosa
12	David Baltin

=== Ladies ===
The ladies' competition featured the usual match of this era between Janet Lynn and Julie Lynn Holmes. Holmes had a small lead after the compulsory figures but Lynn pulled ahead in the free skating, in spite of missing an attempt at a triple toe loop. Holmes included an unusual inside double Axel in her free skating.

Rank	Name
1	Janet Lynn
2	Julie Lynn Holmes
3	Suna Murray
4	Dawn Glab
5	Dorothy Hamill
6	Joanne Darakjy
7	Cindy Watson
8	Sheri Thrapp
9	Juli McKinstry
10	Diane Goldstein
11	Julia Johnson
12	Maud-Frances Dubos

=== Pairs ===
Defending champions JoJo Starbuck / Kenneth Shelley retained their title with a unanimous decision. Their program included new elements which were considered especially daring for the time—a double twist lift and an overhead lift with three positions. The young team of Melissa / Mark Militano finished second, and third place went to Barbara Brown / Doug Berndt in spite of a frightening fall.

Rank	Name
1	JoJo Starbuck / Kenneth Shelley
2	Melissa Militano / Mark Militano
3	Barbara Brown / Doug Berndt
4	Sheri Thrapp / Larry Dusich
5	Kathy Normile / Gregory Taylor
6	Cathy Mishkin / Donald Bonacci
7	Julianne Johnson / Kent Johnson
8	Laura Johnson / Johnny Johns
9	Sherry Vangieson / Dennis Vangieson
10	Ann Pasaric / Dan Pasaric

=== Ice dancing (Gold dance) ===
Judy Schwomeyer / James Sladky dominated the dance event to win their third consecutive national title.

Rank	Name
1	Judy Schwomeyer / James Sladky
2	Anne Millier / Harvey Millier
3	Mary Karen Campbell / Johnny Johns
4	Debbie Ganson / Brad Hislop
5	Jane Pankey / Richard Horne
6	Gretchen Stuart / Nicholas Volanski
7	Debbie Gerken / Peter Bilous
8	Victoria Pedu / Roger Bennett

== Junior results ==
=== Men ===
Rank	Name
1	David Santee
2	Mahlon Bradley
3	Scott Cramer
4	William Schneider
5	Nathan Alden
6	Perry Hutchings
7	Stephen Savino
8	Ted Engelking
9	Roger Glenn
10	Joel Goodrich
11	Alex Rubio

=== Ladies ===
Rank	Name
1	Melissa Militano
2	Mary Marley
3	Patricia Shelley
4	Donna Albert
5	Althea Samson
6	Elizabeth Freeman
7	Kath Malmberg
8	Paula Larson
9	Donna Arquilla
10	Adelie Boucher

=== Pairs ===
Rank	Name
1	Cynthia Van Valkenburg / James Hulick
2	Gale Fuhrman / Joel Fuhrman
3	Michelle McCladdie / Richard Ewell
4	Becky Hale / Jeff Hale
5	Kristin Gilbert / James Huffer
6	Georgia Truffini / Bill McPike
7	Nancy Glenn / Roger Glenn
8	Sheryl Trueman / Jack Courtney
9	Cynthia Conner / Warren Keahey

=== Ice dancing (Silver dance) ===
Rank	Name
1	Cathleen Casey / Francis Cassella
2	Myra Chrien / David Chrien
3	Beatrice Sexton / James Thorn
4	Jane Hickey / Robert Young
5*	Laurie Martin / Fred Martin
6*	Sarah Hill / Roger Fortin
7*	Dorothy Barker / Herbert Swain
8*	Karen Warloe / Richard Kolodziej
9*	Suzanne Metzel / Ronald Radke

* Eliminated before final round

== Sources ==
- "Nationals", Skating magazine, April 1971
