= 1979 U.S. Figure Skating Championships =

Figure skating competition

1979 US Figure Skating Championships
- Type: National Championship
- Date: January 30 – February 3
- Season: 1978-79
- Location: Cincinnati, Ohio
- Venue: Queen City FSC

Champions
- Men's singles: Charles Tickner (Senior); James Santee (Junior)
- Women's singles: Linda Fratianne (Senior); Elaine Zayak (Junior)
- Pairs: Tai Babilonia and Randy Gardner (Senior); Rosemary Sweeney and Daniel Salera (Junior)
- Ice dance: Stacey Smith and John Summers (Senior); Elisa Spitz and Stanley Makman (Junior)
- Previous: 1978 U.S. Championships
- Next: 1980 U.S. Championships

The 1979 U.S. Figure Skating Championships were held from January 30-February 3 at the Queen City FSC in Cincinnati, Ohio. Gold, silver, and bronze medals were awarded in four disciplines – men's singles, women's singles, pair skating, and ice dancing – across three levels: senior, junior, and novice.

The event determined the U.S. teams for the 1979 World Figure Skating Championships.

== Senior results ==
=== Men ===
Rank	Name
1	Charles Tickner
2	Scott Cramer
3	David Santee
4	Scott Hamilton
5	Robert Wagenhoffer
6	John Carlow
7	Allen Schramm
8	Brian Boitano
9	Reggie Raiford
10	Ted Masdea
11	Bill Tilghman
12	Richard Rigby

=== Women ===
Rank	Name
1	Linda Fratianne
2	Lisa-Marie Allen
3	Carrie Rugh
4	Sandy Lenz
5	Alicia Risberg
6	Jill Sawyer
7	Simone Grigorescu
8	Cindy Moyers
9	Kelsy Ufford
10	Aimee Kravette
11	Laura McDonald
12	Suzie Brasher

=== Pairs ===
Rank	Name
1	Tai Babilonia / Randy Gardner
2	Vicki Heasley / Robert Wagenhoffer
3	Sheryl Franks / Mike Botticelli
4	Tracy Prussack / Scott Prussack
5	Lea Ann Miller / William Fauver
6	Marie DiDomenico / Larry Schrier
7	Caitlin Carruthers / Peter Carruthers
8	Lyndy Marron / Hal Marron
9	Kathie Laisure / Brian Kader
10	Leanne La Brake / Jeffrey La Brake

=== Ice dancing (Gold dance) ===
Rank	Name
1	Stacey Smith / John Summers
2	Carol Fox / Richard Dalley
3	Judy Blumberg / Michael Seibert
4	Kim Krohn / Barry Hagan
5	Dee Oseroff / Craig Bond
6	Karen Mankowich / Douglas Mankowich
7	Ellen Pulver / Donald Adair
8	Sheila Corcoran / J.J. Kohlhas Jr
9	Bonnie Burton / William Burton
10	Judy Ferris / Scott Gregory
11	Cathleen Marron / Jay Pinkerton

== Junior results ==
=== Men ===
Rank	Name
1	James Santee
2	Bobby Beauchamp
3	Stuart Bailey
4	Tom Dickson
5	Jim White
6	Nathan Birch
7	Robert Faulkner
8	Timothy Murphy
9	David Michalowski
10	Eddie Dom

=== Women ===
Rank	Name
1	Elaine Zayak
2	Jackie Farrell
3	Lynn Smith
4	Joyce Newell
5	Vicki Heasley
6	Kristie Hogan
7	Melissa Thomas
8	Dana Graham
9	Michelle Schelske
10	Alysse Soll
10	Bunny Blake

=== Pairs ===
Rank	Name
1	Rosemary Sweeney / Daniel Salera
2	Danelle Porter / Burt Lancon
3	Elizabeth Chabot / Peter Oppegard
4	Beth Flora / Ken Flora
5	Dana Graham / Paul Wylie
6	Lynne Freeman / Jay Freeman
7	Maryan Amaral / Bryan Amaral
8	Cara Gill / Craig Gill
9	Jennifer Rhiule / Robbie Baker
10	Dawn Roberge / Dale Roberge

=== Ice dancing (Silver dance) ===
Rank	Name
1	Elisa Spitz / Stanley Makman
2	Renee Roca / Andrew Ouellette
3	Robi Shepard / Kelly Witt
4	Terri Slate / David Lipowitz
5	Susan De Rosa / Michael McIntyre
6	Diana Georgeou / Ari Lieb
7	Carol Shultz / Bill Eddy
8	Shannon Conn / Jack Hackett
9	Deanna Stone / Randy Branca

== Sources ==
- "Nationals", Skating magazine, Mar 1979
