= 1978 U.S. Figure Skating Championships =

Figure skating competition

1978 US Figure Skating Championships
- Type: National Championship
- Date: February 8 – February 11
- Season: 1977–78
- Location: Portland, Oregon
- Host: Oregon Skating Council
- Venue: Memorial Coliseum

Champions
- Men's singles: Charles Tickner (Senior); Brian Boitano (Junior)
- Women's singles: Linda Fratianne (Senior); Jill Sawyer (Junior)
- Pairs: Tai Babilonia and Randy Gardner (Senior); Marie DiDomenico and Larry Schrier (Junior)
- Ice dance: Stacey Smith and John Summers (Senior); Judy Ferris and Scott Gregory (Junior)
- Previous: 1977 U.S. Championships
- Next: 1979 U.S. Championships

The 1978 U.S. Figure Skating Championships were held from February 8–11 at the Memorial Coliseum in Portland, Oregon. Gold, silver, and bronze medals were awarded in four disciplines – men's singles, women's singles, pair skating, and ice dancing – across three levels: senior, junior, and novice.

The event determined the U.S. teams for the 1978 World Figure Skating Championships.

== Senior results ==
=== Men ===
Rank	Name
1	Charles Tickner
2	David Santee
3	Scott Hamilton
4	Scott Cramer
5	John Carlow Jr
6	Robert Wagenhoffer
7	Mahlon Bradley
8	Mark Cockerell
9	Billy Schneider
10	Tim Zink
11	David Kinser

=== Women ===
Rank	Name
1	Linda Fratianne
2	Lisa-Marie Allen
3	Priscilla Hill
4	Carrie Rugh
5	Kelsy Ufford
6	Sandy Lenz
7	Aimee Kravette
8	Editha Dotson
9	Jeanne Chapman
10	Suzie Brasher
11	Carol Hansen

=== Pairs ===
Rank	Name
1	Tai Babilonia / Randy Gardner
2	Gail Hamula / Frank Sweiding
3	Sheryl Franks / Mike Botticelli
4	Vicki Heasley / Robert Wagenhoffer
5	Judi Owens / William Fauver
6	Tracy Prussack / Scott Prussack
7	Kathie Laisure / Brian Kader
8	Caitlin Carruthers / Peter Carruthers
9	Lyndy Marron / Hal Marron
10	Lorene Mitchell / Donald Mitchell
11	Cheryl Stewart / Jeffrey Stewart

=== Ice dancing (Gold dance) ===
Rank	Name
1	Stacey Smith / John Summers
2	Carol Fox / Richard Dalley
3	Susan Kelley / Andrew Stroukoff
4	Kim Krohn / Barry Hagan
5	Karen Mankowich / Douglas Mankowich
6	Sheila Corcoran / J.J. Kohlhas Jr
7	Hae Sue Park / Patrick Shannon
8	Bonnie Burton / William Burton
9	Dee Oseroff / Craig Bond
10	Nancy Berghoff / Eric Walden

== Junior results ==
=== Men ===
Rank	Name
1	Brian Boitano
2	Patrick Hughes
3	James Santee
4	Robert Faulkner
5	George Scolarl Jr
6	David Michalowski
7	Richard Zander
8	Richard Perez
9	Gregory Estey

=== Women ===
Rank	Name
1	Jill Sawyer
2	Alicia Risberg
3	Cindy Moyers
4	Lynn Smith
5	Kristy Hogan
6	Sandy Hurtubise
7	Lori Benton
8	Pamela Fates
9	Tina Miezio
10	Dana Graham

=== Pairs ===
Rank	Name
1	Marie DiDomenico / Larry Schrier
2	Beth Flora / Ken Flora
3	Leanne La Brake / Jeffrey La Brake
4	Michelle Dornan / Alan Wardin
5	Lynne Freeman / Jay Freeman
6	Elizabeth Chabot / Peter Oppegard
7	Lea Ann Miller / Chuck Shaull
8	Elizabeth Gillis / Michael Dee
9	Dana Graham / Paul Wylie

=== Ice dancing (Silver dance) ===
Rank	Name
1	Judy Ferris / Scott Gregory
2	Becky Lee Baker / Rick Berg
3	Judy Blumberg / Bob Engler
4	Laura Lansinger / Andrew Ouellette
5	Susan Costantino / Philip Piasecki
6	Karen Berzon / Gary Forman
7	Angela Kruse / R. Eric Jacobson
8	Robi Shepard / Kelly Witt
9	Lisa Stillwell / Robert Lanford
10	Terri Slate / David Lipowitz

== Sources ==
- "Nationals", Skating magazine, Mar 1978
