= 1976 U.S. Figure Skating Championships =

Figure skating competition

1976 US Figure Skating Championships
- Type: National Championship
- Date: January 7 – January 10
- Season: 1975-76
- Location: Colorado Springs, Colorado
- Venue: Broadmoor Skating Club

Champions
- Men's singles: Terry Kubicka (Senior); Scott Hamilton (Junior)
- Women's singles: Dorothy Hamill (Senior); Carrie Rugh (Junior)
- Pairs: Tai Babilonia and Randy Gardner (Senior); Tracy Prussack and Scott Prussack (Junior)
- Ice dance: Colleen O'Connor and Jim Millns (Senior); Bonnie Burton and William Burton (Junior)
- Previous: 1975 U.S. Championships
- Next: 1977 U.S. Championships

The 1976 U.S. Figure Skating Championships were held from January 7-10 at the Broadmoor Skating Club in Colorado Springs, Colorado. Gold, silver, and bronze medals were awarded in four disciplines – men's singles, women's singles, pair skating, and ice dancing – across three levels: senior, junior, and novice.

The event determined the U.S. teams for the 1976 World Figure Skating Championships and the 1976 Winter Olympics.

== Senior results ==
=== Men ===
Rank	Name
1	Terry Kubicka
2	David Santee
3	Scott Cramer
4	Charles Tickner
5	Mahlon Bradley
6	Randy Gardner
7	Tim Zink
8	Chris Kales
9	Perry Jewell
10	Billy Schneider
11	Frank Sweiding
WD	Ken Newfield

=== Women ===
Rank	Name
1	Dorothy Hamill
2	Linda Fratianne
3	Wendy Burge
4	Kath Malmberg
5	Priscilla Hill
6	Karen DeAngelo
7	Barbara Salomon
8	Elisabeth Freeman
9	Lisa-Marie Allen
10	Suzle Brasher
11	Teri Klindworth
12	Editha Dotson
WD	Barbie Smith

=== Pairs ===
Rank	Name
1	Tai Babilonia / Randy Gardner
2	Alice Cook / Bill Fauver
3	Emily Benenson / Jack Courtney
4	Gale Fuhrman / Joel Fuhrman
5	Lisa Carey / Douglas Varvais
6	Sheryl Franks / Mike Botticelli
7	Lorene Mitchell / Donald Mitchell
8	Holly Blunt / Bruce Hurd
9	Janet Van Camp / Gordon Black
10	Joyce Hanson / Anthony Kudrna

=== Ice dancing (Gold dance) ===
Rank	Name
1	Colleen O'Connor / Jim Millns
2	Judi Genovesi / Kent Weigle
3	Susan Kelley / Andrew Stroukoff
4	Michelle Ford / Glenn Patterson
5	Dee Oseroff / Craig Bond
6	Jennifer Vogel / David Siebert
7	Debbie Ganson / Gerry Lane
8	Cathy Macri / Tim Hodges
9	Stacey Smith / John Summers
10	Jackie Booth / Eric Walden
11	Deborah Mansfield / Frederick Maynard
12	Kathy Russell / David Hold
13	Cathy Marron / Hal Marron

== Junior results ==
=== Men ===
Rank	Name
1	Scott Hamilton
2	Mark Cockerell
3	Dave Kinser
4	Allen Schramm
5	Richard Rigby
6	Orest Jowyk
7	Robert Wagenhoffer
8	Ted Masdea
9	Ray Belmonte
WD	Reggie Stanley

=== Women ===
Rank	Name
1	Carrie Rugh
2	Jeanne Chapman
3	Sandy Lenz
4	Martha Jowyk
5	Clarissa Perrella
6	Tracy Doyle
7	Kathy Gelecinsky
8	Sally Anderson
9	Laura McDonald
10	Carol Hansen

=== Pairs ===
Rank	Name
1	Tracy Prussack / Scott Prussack
2	Dana Reisman / Edward Reisman
3	Danelle Porter / John Maddison
4	Martha Jowyk / Orest Jowyk
5	Kathie Laisure / Brian Kader
6	Marylou Robinson / Ray Belmonte
7	Joy Hoepfl / Bruce Forciea
8	Debbie Weinstein / Richard Dodson
9	Caitlin Carruthers / Peter Carruthers

=== Ice dancing (Silver dance) ===
Rank	Name
1	Bonnie Burton / William Burton
2	Carol Fox / Richard Dalley
3	Kim Krohn / Barry Hagan
4	Diana Runde / Kenneth Simler
5	Felicia DiGiusto / Donald Adair
6	Karen Berzon / Gary Forman
7	Kelly Morris / Michael Seibert
8	Marianne Souza / Mickey McCann
9	Laura Pierce / Rick Berg

== Sources ==
- "Nationals", Skating magazine, Feb 1976
