= 1966 U.S. Figure Skating Championships =

Figure skating competition

- Type: National Championship
- Date: January 26 – 29
- Season: 1965–66
- Location: Berkeley, California
- Host: St. Moritz Ice Skating Club

Champions
- Men's singles: Scott Allen (Senior); John Misha Petkevich (Junior)
- Women's singles: Peggy Fleming (Senior); Janet Lynn (Junior)
- Pairs: Cynthia Kauffman and Ronald Kauffman (Senior); Betty Lewis and Richard Gilbert (Junior)
- Ice dance: Kristin Fortune and Dennis Sveum (Senior); Dolly Rodenbaugh and Thomas Lescinski (Junior)
- Previous: 1965 U.S. Championships
- Next: 1967 U.S. Championships

The 1966 U.S. Figure Skating Championships were held in Berkeley, California from January 26 to 29, 1966. Medals were awarded in three colors: gold (first), silver (second), and bronze (third) in four disciplines – men's singles, ladies' singles, pair skating, and ice dancing – across three levels: senior, junior, and novice.

The event determined the U.S. team for the 1966 World Championships.

== Senior results ==
=== Men ===
Rank	Name
1	Scott Allen
2	Gary Visconti
3	Billy Chapel
4	Tim Wood
5	Paul McGrath
6	Duane Maki
7	Richard Callaghan
8	Ronnie Frank

=== Ladies ===
Rank	Name
1	Peggy Fleming
2	Albertina Noyes
3	Pamela Schneider
4	Sharon Bates
5	Sondra Lee Holmes
6	Taffy Pergament
7	Myrna Bodek
8	Louise Wakefield
9	Joya Utermohlen

=== Pairs ===
Rank	Name
1	Cynthia Kauffman / Ronald Kauffman
2	Susan Berens / Roy Wagelein
3	Page Paulsen / Larry Dusich

=== Ice dancing (Gold dance) ===
Rank	Name
1	Kristin Fortune / Dennis Sveum
2	Lorna Dyer / John Carrell
3	Susan Urban / Stanley Urban
4	Sandra Schwomeyer / James Pennington
5	Alma Davenport / Roger Berry
6	Judy Schwomeyer / James Sladky
7	Janet Burhans / Nicholas Burhans
8	Wilma Piper / Thomas Easton
9*	Vicki Camper / Eugene Heffron
10*	Barbara McEvoy / John Hubschmitt
11*	Dianne Tyler / Bruce Tyler
12*	Kristine Myers / Michael Wayland

*Eliminated before Final Round

== Junior results ==
=== Men ===
Rank	Name
1	John Misha Petkevich
2	James Disbrow
3	W. Patrick Lalor
4	Barry Munns
5	Johnny Moore
6	Jeffrey Hall
7	Gordon McKellen Jr.
8	Dana Charette
9	Chris Young

=== Ladies ===
Rank	Name
1	Janet Lynn
2	Gail Newberry
3	Wendy Jones
4	Ardith Paul
5	Julie Lynn Holmes
6	Coco Gram
7	Annetta Baird
8	Diane Schatz
9	Kim Millett

=== Pairs ===
Rank	Name
1	Betty Lewis / Richard Gilbert
2	Sandi Sweitzer / Jerry Entwistle
3	JoJo Starbuck / Kenneth Shelley
4	Dede Dahlberg / Lowell Green
5	Michelle Viaux / Roger Collard
6	Wen-an Sun / Torrey Sun
7	Bona-Dai Beckstrom / Bobby Mecay
8	Susan Gearhart / Bud Gearhart

=== Ice dancing (Silver dance) ===
Rank	Name
1	Dolly Rodenbaugh / Thomas Lescinski
2	Barrett Brown / Gary Palmer
3	Suzanne Gillespie / John Bickel
4	Susan Roberts / Bill Roberts
5*	Ellen Grande / Michael Mynatt
6*	Jean Bomberg / Monroe Meier
7*	Gay Fendler / Preston Ervin
8*	Colleen O'Connor / Terry Berry
9*	Donna Young / Eddie Marshall
10*	Donna Lee Marsh / Curt Croxford
11*	Christine Simon / Bill Moyers

*Eliminated before Final Round
