= 1973 U.S. Figure Skating Championships =

Figure skating competition

1973 US Figure Skating Championships
- Type: National Championship
- Date: January 24 – 27
- Season: 1972-73
- Location: Bloomington, Minnesota
- Venue: Metropolitan Sports Center
- Previous: 1972 U.S. Championships
- Next: 1974 U.S. Championships

The 1973 U.S. Figure Skating Championships was held from January 24–27 at the Metropolitan Sports Center in Bloomington, Minnesota. Medals were awarded in three colors: gold (first), silver (second), and bronze (third) in four disciplines – men's singles, ladies' singles, pair skating, and ice dancing – across three levels: senior, junior, and novice.

The event determined the U.S. teams for the 1973 World Figure Skating Championships.

== Senior results ==
=== Men ===
Rank	Name
1	Gordon McKellen
2	Robert Bradshaw
3	David Santee
4	Terry Kubicka
5	John Baldwin, Sr.
6	Charles Tickner
7	Stephen Savino
8	Mark Rehfield
9	Mahlon Bradley
10	Scott Henderson

=== Ladies ===
Rank	Name
1	Janet Lynn
2	Dorothy Hamill
3	Juli McKinstry
4	Diane Goldstein
5	Wendy Burge
6	Kath Malmberg
7	Donna Arquilla
8	Suna Murray
9	Donna Albert
10	Mary Marley
11	Laura Johnson
12	Elizabeth Freeman
13	Priscilla Hill

=== Pairs ===
Rank	Name
1	Melissa Militano / Mark Militano
2	Gale Fuhrman / Joel Fuhrman
3	Emily Benenson / Johnny Johns
4	Debbie Hughes / Phillipp Grout
5	Cozette Cady / Jack Courtney
6	Jodie Martin / Robert Berry
7	Cynthia Van Valkenberg / Jim Hulick

=== Ice dancing (Gold dance) ===
Rank	Name
1	Mary Karen Campbell / Johnny Johns
2	Anne Millier / Harvey Millier
3	Jane Pankey / Richard Horne
4	Colleen O'Connor / Jim Millns
5	Susan Ogletree / Gerard Lane
6	Karen Ralle / Curt Finley
7	Elizabeth Blatherwick / Robert Kaine
8	Christine Linney / Bruce Bowland
9	Jane Hickey / Robert Young
10	Barbara Wayland / Michael Wayland
11	Linda Stroh / Barry Stroh

== Sources ==
- "Nationals", Skating magazine, Apr 1973
