= 1970 U.S. Figure Skating Championships =

Figure skating competition

- Type: National Championship
- Date: February 4 – 7
- Season: 1969–70
- Location: Tulsa, Oklahoma
- Venue: Tulsa Assembly Center
- Previous: 1969 U.S. Championships
- Next: 1971 U.S. Championships

The 1970 U.S. Figure Skating Championships was held at the Tulsa Assembly Center in Tulsa, Oklahoma from February 4 through 7, 1970. Medals were awarded in three colors: gold (first), silver (second), and bronze (third) in four disciplines – men's singles, ladies' singles, pair skating, and ice dancing – across three levels: senior, junior, and novice.

The event determined the U.S. team for the 1970 World Championships.

Attendees at the competition noted that the standard of athleticism was rising among skaters in the lower-level divisions. Of particular note was Melissa Militano, who became one of the first female skaters to land a triple toe loop in winning the bronze medal in the junior ladies' event. Another trend was the domination of skaters from California rather than the traditional skating strongholds of the Northeast and Midwest.

== Senior results ==
=== Men ===
Tim Wood likewise defended his title in a unanimous decision. Wood dominated the compulsory figures part of the competition but skated conservatively in the free skating as he was dealing with a sprained ankle. John Misha Petkevich, previously known primarily for his free skating ability, was a surprising second in the figures, but some found his program to music from "On the Waterfront" jarring, and his costume—a stretch jumpsuit with a white eyelet shirt—was considered unusually daring as well. Meanwhile, Kenneth Shelley, who finished third, was the audience favorite of the free skating. Shelley was also the winner of the pairs event with his partner JoJo Starbuck.

Rank	Name
1	Tim Wood
2	John Misha Petkevich
3	Kenneth Shelley
4	Roger Bass
5	John Baldwin, Sr.
6	Gordon McKellen
7	Patrick Lalor
8	James Stuart
9	Robert Bradshaw
10	Gilbert Sosa
11	Doug Berndt

=== Ladies ===
Janet Lynn repeated as champion in a unanimous decision of the judges over Julie Lynn Holmes. Lynn won the compulsory figures as well as the free skating, where she skated to Claude Debussy's "Rain Forest".

Rank	Name
1	Janet Lynn
2	Julie Lynn Holmes
3	Dawn Glab
4	Jennie Walsh
5	Joanne Darakjy
6	Suna Murray
7	Cindy Watson
8	Mary Gelderman
9	Christo Ito
10	Susanne Susic
11	Maud-Frances Dubos

=== Pairs ===
JoJo Starbuck / Kenneth Shelley (also 3rd in men's event) won the title, following the retirement of the 1969 champions Cynthia Kauffman / Ronald Kauffman. The pairs field was considered relatively weak at this event.

Rank	Name
1	JoJo Starbuck / Kenneth Shelley
2	Melissa Militano / Mark Militano
3	Sheri Thrapp / Larry Dusich
4	Kathy Normile / Gregory Taylor
5	Sherry Vangieson / Dennis Vangieson
6	Ann Pasaric / Dan Pasaric

=== Ice dancing (Gold dance) ===
Judy Schwomeyer / James Sladky claimed their third consecutive national title.

Rank	Name
1	Judy Schwomeyer / James Sladky
2	Anne Millier / Harvey Millier
3	Debbie Ganson / Brad Hislop
4	Kathy West / Paul Spruell
5	Debbie Gerken / Ray Tiedemann
6	Mary Campbell / Johnny Johns
7	Dianne Tyler / Bruce Tyler
8	Candace Johnstone / Bruce Bowland
9	Ginni Luttenton / Eddie Marshall
10	Joan Sherbloom / Tom Easton
11	Barbara McEvoy / Michael Wayland

== Junior results ==
=== Men ===
Rank	Name
1	Richard Ewell III
2	Jimmy Demogines
3	Mahlon Bradley
4	Mark Rehfield
5	Roger Glenn
6	Dean Hiltzik
7	Charles Tickner
8	David DeCaprio
9	Ted Engelking
10	Will Smith

=== Ladies ===
Rank	Name
1	Juli McKinstry
2	Dorothy Hamill
3	Melissa Militano
4	Julia Johnson
5	Kath Malmberg
6	Diane Goldstein
7	Scootie Paulsen
8	Deborah Milne
9	Audrey King
10	Candy Aylor
11	Patti Barz
12	Karen Zambrzicky
13	Pegeen Naughton

=== Pairs ===
Rank	Name
1	Barbara Brown / Doug Berndt
2	Laurie Brandel / James Hulick
3	Cathy Mishkin / Donald Bonacci
4	Susan Jackson / Bill Fauver
5	Lisa Illsley / Daniel Henry
6	Gale Fuhrman / Joel Fuhrman
7	Nancy Glenn / Roger Glenn
8	Georgia Truffini / Bill McPike
9	Julianne Johnson / Kent Johnson

=== Ice dancing (Silver dance) ===
Rank	Name
1	Mary Bonacci / Gerard Lane
2	Jane Pankey / Richard Horne
3	Cathleen Casey / Francis Cassella
4	Susan Dresel / Michael Fisher
5*	Laurie MacPherson / Fred Martin
6*	Carol Paulsen / Jerry Leonard
7*	Kathleen Ryan / Jeffrey Caird
8*	Dorothy Barker / Herb Swain
9*	Karen Warlos / Richard Kolodziej
10*	Myra Chrien / David Chrien

* Eliminated before final round

== Sources ==
- "U.S. Championships", Skating magazine, April 1970
