= 1974 U.S. Figure Skating Championships =

Figure skating competition

1974 US Figure Skating Championships
- Type: National Championship
- Date: February 6 – 9
- Season: 1973-74
- Location: Providence, Rhode Island
- Venue: Providence Civic Center
- Previous: 1973 U.S. Championships
- Next: 1975 U.S. Championships

The 1974 U.S. Figure Skating Championships was held from February 6-9 at the Providence Civic Center in Providence, Rhode Island. Medals were awarded in three colors: gold (first), silver (second), and bronze (third) in four disciplines – men's singles, ladies' singles, pair skating, and ice dancing – across three levels: senior, junior, and novice.

The event determined the U.S. teams for the 1974 World Figure Skating Championships.

== Senior results ==
=== Men ===
Rank	Name
1	Gordon McKellen
2	Terry Kubicka
3	Charles Tickner
4	John Carlow, Jr.
5	David Santee
6	Scott Cramer
7	John Baldwin, Sr.
8	James Demogines
9	Mahlon Bradley
10	Stephen Savino
10	William Schneider

=== Ladies ===
Rank	Name
1	Dorothy Hamill
2	Juli McKinstry
3	Kath Malmberg
4	Wendy Burge
5	Donna Arquilla
6	Priscilla Hill
7	Diane Goldstein
8	Roberta Loughland
9	Donna Albert
10	Paula Larson
11	Barbara Salomon
12	Elisabeth Freeman

=== Pairs ===
Rank	Name
1	Melissa Militano / Johnny Johns
2	Tai Babilonia / Randy Gardner
3	Erica Susman / Thomas Huff
4	Cynthia Van Valkenberg / Phillipp Grout, Jr.
5	Beth Sweiding / Frank Sweiding
6	Suki Hoagland / Michael Sahlin

=== Ice dancing (Gold dance) ===
Rank	Name
1	Colleen O'Connor / Jim Millns
2	Ann Millier / Skip Millier
3	Michelle Ford / Glenn Patterson
4	Jane Pankey / Richard Horne
5	Judi Genovesi / Kent Weigle
6	Susan Kelley / Andrew Stroukoff
7	Karen Ralle / Curt Finley
8	Christine Linney / Bruce Bowland
9	Liz Blatherwick / Robert Kaine
10	Myra Chrien / David Chrien
11	Kathy Russell / Paul Steiner

== Sources ==
- "Nationals", Skating magazine, Apr 1974
