= 1972 U.S. Figure Skating Championships =

Figure skating competition

1972 US Figure Skating Championships
- Type: National Championship
- Date: January 13 – 16
- Season: 1971–72
- Location: Long Beach, California
- Venue: Long Beach Arena
- Previous: 1971 U.S. Championships
- Next: 1973 U.S. Championships

The 1972 U.S. Figure Skating Championships was held from January 13–16 at the Long Beach Arena in Long Beach, California. Medals were awarded in three colors: gold (first), silver (second), and bronze (third) in four disciplines – men's singles, ladies' singles, pair skating, and ice dancing – across three levels: senior, junior, and novice.

The event determined the U.S. teams for the 1972 Winter Olympics and 1972 World Championships.

The 1972 Championships marked the introduction of a significant innovation: the use of a computer to calculate the competition results for the first time at the U.S. Championships. The initial version of the scoring software, called "Hal", was written by volunteer Al Beard in FORTRAN, and ran via a remote terminal link on a time-sharing system donated by Honeywell in Minneapolis, where Beard was employed. Although the computer results were used for public announcements of the results, the rules of the time actually required hand computation of the official results, so this was done after the fact.

== Senior results ==
=== Men ===
The men's competition saw something of an upset as defending champion John Misha Petkevich had a poor free skating, missing both his triple salchow and triple loop jumps. Kenneth Shelley, on the other hand, had one of the best performances of his career, allowing him to take the title with the first-place votes of 4 of the 7 judges. He became the first skater to win national titles in both senior men and pairs since 1941, and the first in postwar history to qualify for the Winter Olympics in two disciplines.

Rank	Name
1	Kenneth Shelley
2	John Misha Petkevich
3	Gordon McKellen
4	John Baldwin, Sr.
5	Robert Bradshaw
6	James Demogines
7	Richard Ewell
8	David Santee
9	Stephen Savino
10	Dean Hiltzik
11	Perry Hutchings
12	Mahlon Bradley

=== Ladies ===
In compulsory figures, Julie Lynn Holmes took the lead over Janet Lynn. But Lynn easily won the free skating with a faultless performance while Holmes skated cautiously. Second place in the free skating went to Dorothy Hamill, who probably performed the most difficult program but nonetheless could not overcome her deficit in the figures to reach the podium. Suna Murray captured the bronze medal.

Rank	Name
1	Janet Lynn
2	Julie Lynn Holmes
3	Suna Murray
4	Dorothy Hamill
5	Jennie Walsh
6	Juli McKinstry
7	Patricia Shelley
8	Melissa Militano
9	Diane Goldstein
10	Kath Malmberg
11	Julia Johnson
12	Mary Marley
13	Denise Cahill

=== Pairs ===
The previous years' champions JoJo Starbuck / Kenneth Shelley easily defended their title without serious challenge. The pairs competition this year was notable for the new and innovative lifts performed by the second-place team Melissa Militano / Mark Militano as well as by Starbuck / Shelley. The Militanos also included a throw double axel and side-by-side double axels in their program, elements that only a few top pairs in the world were attempting in this era, but they could not match the speed and unison of the champions.

Rank	Name
1	JoJo Starbuck / Kenneth Shelley
2	Melissa Militano / Mark Militano
3	Barbara Brown / Doug Berndt
4	Cozette Cady / Jack Courtney
5	Gale Fuhrman / Joel Fuhrman
6	Cathy Mishkin / Donald Bonacci
7	Cynthia Van Valkenberg / Jim Hulick
8	Laura Johnson / Johnny Johns
9	Kathy Normile / Gregory Taylor
10	/ Kent Johnson

=== Ice dancing (Gold dance) ===
The previous years' champions Judy Schwomeyer / Jim Sladky easily defended their title without serious challenge.

Rank	Name
1	Judy Schwomeyer / James Sladky
2	Anne Millier / Harvey Millier
3	Mary Karen Campbell / Johnny Johns
4	Debbie Ganson / Brad Hislop
5	Jane Pankey / Richard Horne
6	Kathleen West / Rollie Arthur
7	Colleen O'Connor / Jim Millns
8	Cathleen Casey / Francis Cassella
9	Susan Ogletree / Gerard Lane
10	Christine Linney / Bruce Bowland
11	Linda Stroh / Barry Stroh
12	Ginger Snyder / Robert Castle
WD	Barbara Wayland / Michael Wayland

== Junior results ==
=== Men ===
Rank	Name
1	Terry Kubicka
2	Scott Cramer
3	John Carlow
4	William Schneider
5	Terry Tunks
6	Chris Kales
7	Robert Graham
8	Scott Henderson
9	Neil Rubin
10	Nathan Alden
11	Tom Hilfman

=== Ladies ===
Rank	Name
1	Wendy Burge
2	Laurie Brandel
3	Barbara Salomon
4	Donna Arquilla
5	Candyce Wenborg
6	Jannat Thompson
7	Elizabeth Freeman
8	Ruth Cohen
9	Betsy Hobson
10	Diane Dennison

=== Pairs ===
Rank	Name
1	Michelle McCladdie / Richard Ewell
2	Suki Hoagland / Mike Sahlin
3	Georgia Truffini / Bill McPike
4	Jodie Martin / Robert Berry
5	Kristin Gilbert / David DeCaprio
6	Becky Hale / Jeff Hale
7	Deborah Robbins / Jack Colern
8	Patty Morton / Bill Fauver
9	Sheryl Franks / Michael Botticelli

=== Ice dancing (Silver dance) ===
Rank	Name
1	Michelle Ford / Glenn Parriott
2	Shareen Finley / Curt Finley
3	Andrea Peterson / Guy Sexton
4	Beatrice Sexton / James Thorn
5*	Joy Cushner / Stephen Kanter
6*	Laurie Martin / Fred Martin
7*	Sara Hill / Roger Fortin
8*	Stacey Smith / Frank Recco
9*	Mitzi Robinson / Richard Kolodziej
10*	Marcia Fugina / Charles Larson

* Eliminated before final round

== Sources ==
- "Nationals", Skating magazine, Mar 1972
