= Hunka =

Hunka may refer to:

- Ryan Hunka, American former athlete
- Yaroslav Hunka, a Ukrainian former soldier of Waffen SS "Galician", that was naturalized as a Canadian citizen.
- A Hunka Hunka Burns in Love, an episode of the Simpsons
- Hunka Lunka, a studio album by Shamaani Duo
