= 1955 U.S. Figure Skating Championships =

Figure skating competition

1955 US Figure Skating Championships
- Type: National Championship
- Date: March 30 – April 2
- Season: 1954-55
- Location: Colorado Springs, Colorado
- Venue: Broadmoor Skating Club

Champions
- Men's singles: Hayes Alan Jenkins (Senior); Tom Moore (Junior)
- Women's singles: Tenley Albright (Senior); Nancy Heiss (Junior)
- Pairs: Carole Ann Ormaca and Robin Greiner (Senior); Maribel Owen and Charles Foster (Junior)
- Ice dance: Carmel Bodel and Edward Bodel (Senior); Barbara Stein and Ray Sato (Junior)
- Previous: 1954 U.S. Championships
- Next: 1956 U.S. Championships

The 1955 U.S. Figure Skating Championships were held from March 14-17 at the Broadmoor Skating Club in Colorado Springs, Colorado. Gold, silver, and bronze medals were awarded in four disciplines – men's singles, women's singles, pair skating, and ice dancing – across three levels: senior, junior, and novice.

== Senior results ==
=== Men ===
Rank	Name
1	Hayes Alan Jenkins
2	David Jenkins
3	Hugh C. Graham Jr
4	Tim Brown
5	Raymond Blommer

=== Women ===
Rank	Name
1	Tenley Albright
2	Carol Heiss
3	Catherine Machado
4	Patricia Firth
5	Mary Ann Dorsey
6	Claralynn Lewis
7	Miggs Dean

=== Pairs ===
Rank	Name
1	Carole Ann Ormaca / Robin Greiner
2	Lucille Ash / Sully Kothman
3	Agnes Tyson / Richard Swenning

=== Ice dancing (Gold dance) ===
Rank	Name
1	Carmel Bodel / Edward Bodel
2	Joan Zamboni / Roland Junso
3	Phyllis Forney / Martin Forney
4	Sidney Foster / Franklin Nelson
5	Virginia Hoyns / William Kipp
6	Kathleen Heyler / Thomas Sherritt

== Junior results ==
=== Men ===
Rank	Name
1	Tom Moore
2	Robert Brewer
3	Barlow Nelson
4	Lorin Caccamise
5	David Travers
6	Lee Carroll Owen

=== Women ===
Rank	Name
1	Nancy Heiss
2	Janice Marie Crappa
3	Sherry Dorsey
4	Dee Dee Wayland
5	Muriel Reich
6	Charlene Adams
7	Carol Keyes
8	Gladys Irene Jacobs
9	Karin Hepp

=== Pairs ===
Rank	Name
1	Maribel Owen / Charles Foster
2	Patricia Kilgore / James Barlow
3	Mary Kay / Richard Keller
4	Joan Schenke / John Jarmon
5	Janet Harley / Roy Pringle
6	Nancy Heiss / Bruce Heiss
7	Melinda Lelliott / Art Jenkins

=== Ice dancing (Silver dance) ===
Rank	Name
1	Barbara Stein / Ray Sato
2	Jacqueline Holm / Bert Wright
3	Charlene Adams / Lee Carroll Owen
4	Jane Holmes / Robert James
5	Margie Ackles / Charles J. Coulon Jr
6	Sharon McKenzie / Howard Harrold
7	Eleanor Cowell / Sydney Reiss
8	Marilyn Grace / Peter Moesel
