= Gail Borden (figure skater) =

American figure skater (1907–1991)

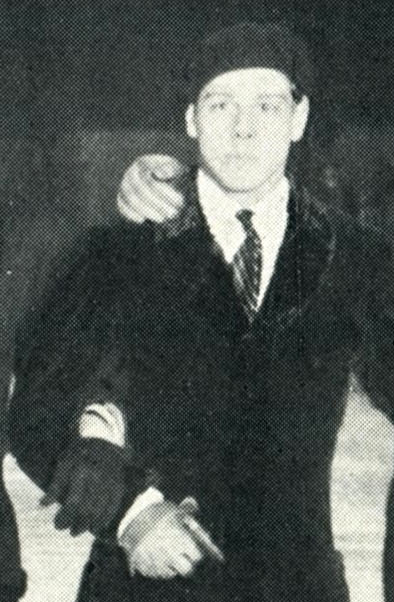
- Borden in 1930

Personal information
- Full name: Gail Borden II
- Born: February 19, 1907 New York, New York, U.S.
- Died: September 11, 1991 (aged 84)

Figure skating career
- Country: United States
- Discipline: Men's singles

Gail Borden II (February 19, 1907 – September 11, 1991) was a 1932 Olympic figure skater in men's singles for the United States, and also placed in the World Figure Skating Championships of 1930 and 1934. He later became a radio and television figure, commenting on hunting and fishing sports. He is the great-grandson of Gail Borden, the inventor of condensed milk.

== Biography ==
Borden was born in New York City. He pursued the sport of men's figure skating from early in his life. He competed at the World Figure Skating Championships in 1930, finishing sixth; and 1934, coming in eighth.

In 1932 he won the bronze medal at the United States Figure Skating Championships, and finished eighth in men's singles at the 1932 Winter Olympics in Lake Placid, New York. Later he married the daughter of Norwegian Olympic diver, Nils Tvedt.

Following his skating career, Borden became a securities broker in New York. He also sailed in competition, and became very interested in hunting and fishing. He also became a wildlife artist. He supported conservation. For year he was a member of the Maidstone Club of East Hampton, the Devon Yacht Club, and the New York Yacht Club.

In 1950 Borden moved from East Hampton, New York to Winter Park, Florida. There he became a member of the Winter Park Racquet Club. He was featured for years on the radio program Hunting & Fishing Club of the Air. He also was featured on the television show The Sportsmans Club from the 1950s through the 1960s.

== Results ==
| Event | 1927 | 1930 | 1931 | 1932 | 1933 | 1934 |
|---|---|---|---|---|---|---|
| Winter Olympic Games | | | | 8th | | |
| World Championships | | 6th | | | | 8th |
| North American Championships | | | 3rd | | | |
| U.S. Championships | 2nd J | 1st J | 4th | 3rd | | |
