= Richard Callaghan =

Former figure skating coach

Richard S. Callaghan is an American former figure skating coach. He is best known as the long-time coach of Todd Eldredge, the 1996 World champion and a six-time U.S. national champion. He also coached Nicole Bobek to her national title, and Tara Lipinski to Olympic, World, and national titles.

Several of Callaghan's former students have accused him of sexually abusing them as minors. Following an investigation into his conduct sparked by allegations reported to the United States Center for SafeSport by a former student, and a decision by an arbitrator, Callaghan was subjected to a suspension and an indefinite ban on coaching minor skaters. In March 2018, Callaghan was suspended from all participation in sports under the auspices of U.S. Olympic Committee member organizations.

== Biography ==
As a competitive skater, Callaghan was coached by Don Laws. His best finish was 5th at the 1965 U.S. Championships. He turned professional in 1967, touring with Ice Capades and Holiday on Ice before he began to coach in 1972. He worked in Rochester, New York, Philadelphia, Colorado Springs, and San Diego before settling in the Detroit area in 1992.

In March 1999, Callaghan announced his resignation from his position at the Detroit Skating Club and his intention to retire at the end of that skating season. In April 1999, The New York Times reported that Callaghan had been accused of sexual misconduct by Craig Maurizi, one of his former students who had continued to work with him for many years as a coaching assistant. Maurizi alleged that Callaghan had engaged in inappropriate sexual conduct with him beginning when he was 15 years old, more than 20 years previously. The Times article additionally quoted two other former students who also claimed to have been molested by Callaghan. Callaghan denied the charges and alleged that Maurizi was attempting to destroy his professional reputation as the result of a dispute the previous year that arose when Lipinski fired Callaghan and named Maurizi as her official coach. In the Times article, Maurizi also claimed to have maintained a romantic and sexual relationship with Callaghan, which was consensual in nature, until he was around 30 years old.

Maurizi filed a grievance against Callaghan with United States Figure Skating Association (USFSA), but the grievance was dismissed in June 1999 without a hearing on the grounds that he had waited too long to file it. Until May, the chairman of the grievance committee, Steve Hazen, said that senior members tried to keep him from reviewing the case. In October 1999, a three-member panel of the Professional Skaters Association said it had found no violation of its ethics standards. As a consequence of the case and the publicity it caused, the USFSA did adopt a formal policy on sexual harassment and other forms of abuse, and has since taken aggressive action against other coaches accused of sexual misconduct with their students. In March 2018, Callaghan was suspended from all participation in sports under the auspices of U.S. Olympic Committee member organizations.

Callaghan said he had grown tired of the travel and grind of being a top coach and that his planned retirement had nothing to do with the grievance. He ultimately did not retire but instead moved to another rink in the Detroit area where he continued to coach Eldredge and other skaters, including Angela Nikodinov, Shizuka Arakawa, and Jennifer Kirk. He is currently based in Coral Gables, Florida where he coached Kimmie Meissner. He now lives in Naples, Florida, and coaches at Germain Arena.

In October 2022, as part of a legal settlement with one of his accusers, Callaghan agreed to no longer coach minor skaters.

== Suspension ==
Callaghan faced allegations of sexual abuse of a minor, which he has denied, brought in a lawsuit filed by a former student in August 2019. Following allegations of sexual abuse reported to the United States Center for SafeSport by a former student, an 18-month investigation resulted in Callaghan receiving a lifetime ban from the sport after it was concluded that he had sexually, physically, and emotionally abused skaters. He appealed this decision to an arbitrator, which resulted in the lifetime ban being lifted and the imposition of a three-year suspension, 15-year probation, and 100 hours of community service. The arbitrator stated that this was due to having to follow the legal standards of the time, which he called "absurd and draconian". Callaghan's suspension by SafeSport concluded in December 2022.

== Results ==
=== Singles career ===
Event	1961	1962	1963	1964	1965
U.S. Championships	5th N.	5th J.	2nd J.	3rd J	6th

=== Ice dancing with Irma Staro ===
Event	1961	1962
U.S. Championships	3rd J.	4th J.
