= Margaret Bennett (figure skater) =

American figure skater (1910–1984)

Margaret Helen Bennett (September 17, 1910 – June 7, 1984) was an American figure skater. She won the silver medal at the U.S. Figure Skating Championships in 1932 and competed in that year's Winter Olympics.

In 1930 Bennett competed in the United States' national skating championship. In 1931 Bennett placed second in the national championship.

Bennett won the state junior skating championship and placed fourth in the North American skating championship.

As of 1935, Bennett was skating professionally and teaching skating.

Bennett was born in Minneapolis, Minnesota and died in Chester, Connecticut.

== Results ==
Event	1927	1928	1930	1931	1932
Winter Olympic Games					11th
World Championships					12th
U.S. Championships	3rd J	5th J	3rd J	1st J	2nd
