= Jeb Rand =

- Born: Jeb Rand; Marietta, Georgia, United States
- Occupation(s): Live show writer, producer, director
- Website: www.randproductions.com

Jeb Rand is an American former amateur and professional figure skater. Rand is the president and executive producer of Rand Enterprises And Productions, Inc., a Las Vegas, Nevada-based production company.

== Skating career ==
As an amateur skater, Rand was a three-time national team member for U.S. Figure Skating from 1986 to 1988.

Rand skated professionally for 15 years with his wife in principal roles for Disney on Ice (1990–91), Chapel Gordon Productions Las Vegas (1992), Stars on Ice – Italian Tour (1993–94), Ice Capades (1996–97), and Radio City Music Hall's Christmas Spectacular in New York City (1998–2005).

== Personal life ==
Rand is married to Jennifer Rand; they have two daughters, Hayden, born in 2008, and Mackenzie, born in 2010.
