= 1956 U.S. Figure Skating Championships =

Figure skating competition

1956 US Figure Skating Championships
- Type: National Championship
- Date: March 14 – March 17
- Season: 1955-56
- Location: Philadelphia, Pennsylvania
- Host: Philadelphia Skating Club and Humane Society
- Venue: Philadelphia Arena

Champions
- Men's singles: Hayes Alan Jenkins (Senior); Robert Lee Brewer (Junior)
- Women's singles: Tenley Albright (Senior); Joan Schenke (Junior)
- Pairs: Carole Ann Ormaca and Robin Greiner (Senior); Nancy Rouillard and Ronald Ludington (Junior)
- Ice dance: Joan Zamboni and Roland Junso (Senior); Aileen Kahre and Charles Phillips Jr (Junior)
- Previous: 1955 U.S. Championships
- Next: 1957 U.S. Championships

The 1956 U.S. Figure Skating Championships were held from March 14-17 at the Philadelphia Arena in Philadelphia, Pennsylvania. Gold, silver, and bronze medals were awarded in four disciplines – men's singles, women's singles, pair skating, and ice dancing – across three levels: senior, junior, and novice.

== Senior results ==
=== Men ===
Rank	Name
1	Hayes Alan Jenkins
2	Ronald Robertson
3	David Jenkins
4	Tim Brown
5	Thomas Moore
6	Raymond Blommer

=== Women ===
Rank	Name
1	Tenley Albright
2	Carol Heiss
3	Catherine Machado
4	Claralynn Lewis
5	Nancy Heiss
6	Mary Ann Dorsey
7	Charlene Adams

=== Pairs ===
Rank	Name
1	Carole Ann Ormaca / Robin Greiner
2	Lucille Ash / Sully Kothman
3	Maribel Owen / Charles Foster
4	Carol Lux / James Barlow

=== Ice dancing (Gold dance) ===
Rank	Name
1	Joan Zamboni / Roland Junso
2	Carmel Bodel / Edward Bodel
3	Sidney Arnold / Franklin Nelson
4	Sharon McKenzie / Bert Wright
5	Susan Sebo / Tim Brown

== Junior results ==
=== Men ===
Rank	Name
1	Robert Lee Brewer
2	Barlow Nelson
3	Bradley Lord
4	Tommy Weinreich
5	James Short
6	Richard Swenning
7	Peter Betts
8	Robin Greiner
9	David Shulman

=== Women ===
Rank	Name
1	Joan Schenke
2	Lynn Finnegan
3	Sherry Dorsey
4	Carol Wanek
5	Karin Hepp
6	DeeDee Wayland
7	Carol Keyes
8	Tonny Hoonhout
9	Gladys Irene Jacobs

=== Pairs ===
Rank	Name
1	Nancy Rouillard / Ronald Ludington
2	Mary Kay / Richard Keller
3	Sharon Constable / Johnny Hertz
4	Antoinette Abell / Robert Keyes
5	Margaret Jurmo / Roy Pringle
6	Nancy Lee Copeland / Roy Cofer
7	Gayle Benvie / Karl Freed
8	Bridget O'Rourke / Carl Olsson

=== Ice dancing (Silver dance) ===
Rank	Name
1	Aileen Kahre / Charles Phillips Jr
2	Claire O'Neill / John J. Bejshak Jr
3	Barbara Roles / James Short
4	Margie Ackles / Howie Harrold
5	Judy Lamar / Ronald Ludington
6	Patricia Major / Peter Moesel
7	Eleanor Reiss / Sydney Reiss
8	Judy Kay Boner / Edwin Zschau
9	Gail Kizer / Roy Speeg
