= Edward LeMaire =

American figure skater (1924–1961)

- Born: October 26, 1924
- Died: February 15, 1961 (aged 36) near Brussels, Belgium
- Resting place: Greenwood Union Cemetery; Rye, New York, U.S.
- Education: Yale University; University of Nevada
- Occupation: Figure skater
- Spouse: Muriel Gerli (m. 1945)
- Children: 3

Edward LeMaire (October 26, 1924 – February 15, 1961) was an American figure skater who competed in pairs and men's singles.

== Early life ==
Edward LeMaire was born on October 26, 1924. His father was a figure skater and his mother was a performer with the Reynolds circus family. At the age of seven, LeMaire skated at an exhibition at the 1932 Winter Olympics. He attended Yale University and graduated from the University of Nevada with a degree in mining engineering in 1952.

== Career ==
In pairs, LeMaire won the junior title at the United States Figure Skating Championships in 1942 and won a bronze medal in senior pairs the following year with Dorothy Goos. Also in 1943, he captured the junior men's national title.

LeMaire was a Navy pilot during World War II. He also competed in professional roller skating competitions and was a national champion. He worked as an investment broker. He was a coach for the U.S. skating team.

== Personal life ==
LeMaire married Muriel Gerli in 1945. They had two daughters and a son, Dorinda, Diana and Richard Osborn. They lived in Rye, New York.

LeMaire was en route to the World Figure Skating Championships on February 15, 1961, when his plane (Sabena Flight 548) crashed near Brussels, Belgium, killing all on board, including the U.S. figure skating team. His 14-year-old son Richard was also killed in the crash. He was buried next to his son at Greenwood Union Cemetery in Rye.

== Results ==
men's singles

Event	1941	1942	1943
U.S. Championships	3rd J.	2nd J.	1st J.

pairs with Goos

Event	1942	1943
U.S. Championships	1st J.	3rd
