= Suzie Brasher =

American figure skater

Personal information
- Born: 1960 or 1961

Figure skating career
- Country: United States

Suzie Brasher (born in 1960 or 1961) is an American former competitive figure skater. She won the World Junior Championships in 1976, its inaugural year. She was first in compulsory figures, second in the short program, and first in the free skate. Brasher, then a student at Olympus High School in Holladay, Utah, was named the 1976 Sportsperson of the Year in Utah.

She is now a coach at Cottonwood Heights FSC in Salt Lake City, Utah.

== Results ==
International
Event	1975–76	1976–77
Skate Canada International		6th
International: Junior
World Junior Championships	1st	
