= Ryan Hunka =

American figure skater

Figure skating career
- Country: United States
- Discipline: Men's singles
- Coach: Carol Heiss Jenkins; Glyn Watts

Ryan Hunka is an American former competitive figure skater. He is the 1991 Nebelhorn Trophy champion and 1991 Grand Prix International St. Gervais bronze medalist.

Having begun skating at age five, Hunka was coached from the age of eight by Carol Heiss Jenkins and Glyn Watts in Cleveland, Ohio. He won the U.S. national novice title in February 1990. Two years later, he became the U.S. national junior champion. He finished in the top ten at three World Junior Championships – 1991 (Budapest), 1992 (Hull, Quebec), and 1993 (Seoul).

After retiring from competition, Hunka became the president and CEO of Creative Innovations Intl. Inc. and Miracle Management Corporation. He was the director of operations for Major League Figure Skating and founded PrimeTime Figure Skating. He was the director of skating at clubs in Brooklyn, New York; Omaha, Nebraska; and the Amherst Skating Club in Amherst, New York.

== Competitive highlights ==
International
Event	1990–91	1991–92	1992–93
Nebelhorn Trophy		1st	
International St. Gervais		3rd	
International: Junior
World Junior Champ.	9th	8th	9th
National
U.S. Championships	3rd J	1st J	13th
