= Tim Wood (figure skater) =

American figure skater (born 1948)

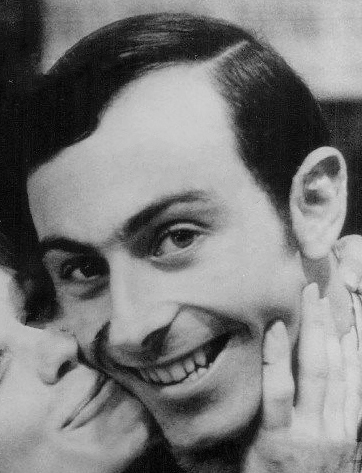
- Wood with Gabriele Seyfert in 1969

Personal information
- Full name: Timothy Lyle Wood
- Born: June 21, 1948 (age 78) Highland Park, Michigan, U.S.
- Height: 178 cm (5 ft 10 in)

Figure skating career
- Country: United States
- Skating club: Detroit Skating Club
Medal record
figure skating: Men's singles
Representing United States
Olympic Games
Silver medal – second place	1968 Grenoble	Singles
World Championships
Gold medal – first place	1970 Ljubljana	Singles
Gold medal – first place	1969 Colorado Springs	Singles
Silver medal – second place	1968 Geneva	Singles
North American Championships
Gold medal – first place	1969 Oakland	Singles
U.S. Championships
Gold medal – first place	1968 Philadelphia	Men’s Singles
Gold medal – first place	1969 Seattle	Men’s Singles
Gold medal – first place	1970 Tulsa	Men’s Singles
Bronze medal – third place	1965 Lake Placid	Men’s Singles
Bronze medal – third place	1967 Omaha	Men’s Singles

Timothy Lyle Wood is an American former figure skater. He is a two-time World champion, a 1968 Olympic silver medalist and a three-time U.S. national champion.

== Personal life ==
Born on June 21, 1948, in Highland Park, Michigan, Timothy Lyle Wood is the youngest of four sons of Kenneth Wood, a surgeon known for his work with lung cancer patients. In 1968, he was a pre-law student at John Carroll University. He later attended a graduate school in accounting.

== Skating career ==
Wood was taught by the English coach Ronnie Baker at the Detroit Skating Club from the age of seven. He became the U.S. national novice champion in the 1961–62 season. On the junior level, he was awarded the bronze medal at the 1963 U.S. Championships and won the title in 1964.

The following season, Wood advanced to the senior level and took bronze at the 1965 U.S. Championships in Lake Placid, New York. Assigned to his first major international events, he placed 5th at the North American Championships and 13th at the World Championships in Colorado Springs, Colorado.

Fourth at the 1966 U.S. Championships, he returned to the top three the following year. He finished 9th at the 1967 World Championships in Vienna, Austria.

At the 1968 U.S. Championships in Philadelphia, Wood defeated Gary Visconti and John Misha Petkevich to win the first of his three U.S. national titles. The trio were selected to represent the U.S. at the 1968 Winter Olympics in Grenoble, France. Still coached by Baker, Wood won the Olympic silver medal after placing second in the compulsory figures and third in the free skate. He stood on the podium with Austria's Wolfgang Schwarz (gold) and France's Patrick Péra (bronze). Wood attributed his success to becoming mature enough to conquer his competition nerves, and to training harder. While also a university student, he spent 7 and a half hours a day training, including at least four hours just on compulsory figures. Competing in Geneva, Switzerland at the 1968 World Championships, he finished second to the defending World champion Emmerich Danzer of Austria, who had been fourth at the Olympics.

In 1969, Wood successfully defended his national title against Petkevich and won the 1969 North American Championships ahead of Canada's Jay Humphry. He then won his first World title, finishing ahead of Czechoslovakia's Ondrej Nepela and France's Patrick Péra at the event in Colorado Springs, Colorado.

Prevailing against Petkevich, Wood became national champion for the third consecutive year at the 1970 U.S. Championships in Tulsa, Oklahoma. He then overcame a challenge from Nepela to win the 1970 World Championships in Ljubljana, Yugoslavia.

During Wood's professional skating career, he performed with the Ice Capades, Ice Follies and Holiday on Ice.

== Later life ==
Wood formed a limited liability company, TLW, in 1996, and has expressed interest in opening a sports complex in California. In May 2015, it was reported that several investors had filed lawsuits against him.

== Results ==
International
Event	1962	1963	1964	1965	1966	1967	1968	1969	1970
Winter Olympics							2nd		
World Championships				13th		9th	2nd	1st	1st
North American Champ.				5th		5th		1st	
National
U.S. Championships	1st N.	3rd J.	1st J.	3rd	4th	3rd	1st	1st	1st
Levels: N. = Novice; J. = Junior
