= Don Laws =

American figure skater and coach

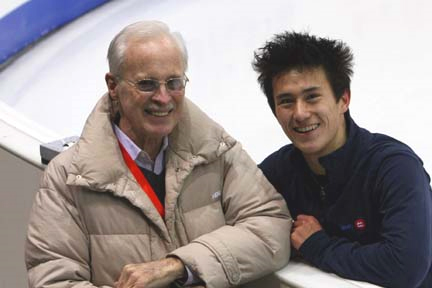
- Laws with Patrick Chan in 2007

Personal information
- Born: May 30, 1929 Washington, D.C., U.S.
- Died: December 2, 2014 (aged 85) Sandy Spring, Maryland, U.S.

Figure skating career
- Country: United States
- Discipline: Men's singles, Ice dance
- Partner: Mary Firth (former)
- Coach: Osborne Colson (former)
- Retired: 1951

Don Laws (May 30, 1929 – December 2, 2014) was an American figure skater and coach.

== Personal life ==
Don Laws was born on May 30, 1929, in Washington, D.C. He had a brother, Willard Laws, and sister, Laura Keesling. In 1951, he joined the United States Army Security Agency.

Laws died of heart failure on December 2, 2014, in Sandy Spring, Maryland.

== Career ==
Don Laws competed in single skating and ice dancing. With his ice dancing partner, Mary Firth, he won the U.S. junior title in 1948. In men's singles, he won the 1950 U.S. junior title and placed seventh at the 1951 World Championships in Milan, Italy. He was coached by Osborne Colson.

After retiring from competitive skating, Laws became a coach. His students included Scott Hamilton, Tiffany Chin, Michael Weiss, and Patrick Chan.

Laws was inducted into the United States Figure Skating Hall of Fame in 2001 and the Professional Skaters Association Coaches Hall of Fame in 2004. In 2005, he received a "Lifetime Achievement Award" from the Michael Weiss Foundation. Laws was one of the Americans who help create the ISU Judging System, which replaced the 6.0 scoring system in 2004. He was a former president of the Professional Skaters Association and a Lifetime Achievement Honorary Member of that association. He served on the International Skating Union's Singles and Pairs Committee.

An inspiring biography, "Don Laws: The Life of an Olympic Figure Skating Coach" written by Beverly Ann Menke and including a foreword by Scott Hamilton, was published in 2012.
