= Jill Sawyer =

American figure skater

Personal information
- Born: January 13, 1963 (age 63) Seattle, WA
- Home town: Tacoma, WA

Figure skating career
- Country: United States
- Retired: 1979

Jill Sawyer also known as Hotdog Sawyer is an American former competitive figure skater from Tacoma, Washington. She is the 1978 World Junior champion and the 1978 Prague Skate champion.

Sawyer trained in Tacoma, Washington, coached by Kathy Casey. As a 14-year-old, she drew attention for her ability to land the triple lutz, then a rare jump in ladies' singles.

In 1978, Sawyer won gold at the World Junior Championships and Prague Skate. She ceased competing soon after.

== Competitive highlights ==
International
Event	1976–77	1977–78	1978–79
World Junior Championships		1st	
Prague Skate			1st
National
U.S. Championships	1st N.	1st J.	6th
Levels: N. = Novice; J. = Junior
