= Emily Benenson =

American figure skater (born 1957)

Emily Benenson (born 1957) is an American figure skater. She competed in pairs with partner Johnny Johns, and the duo won a bronze medal at the 1973 U.S. Figure Skating Championships. After their partnership ended, she paired with Jack Courtney.

== Competitive Highlights ==
(with Courtney)

| Event | 1975 | 1976 |
|---|---|---|
| U.S. Championships | 3rd | 3rd |

(with Johns)

| Event | 1973 |
|---|---|
| U.S. Championships | 3rd |

=== (with Johns) ===
1973

- U.S. Championships - 3rd

=== (with Courtney) ===
1975

- U.S. Championships - 3rd

1976

- U.S. Championships - 3rd
