= Carol Fox (figure skater) =

American figure skater

Carol Jean Fox (born November 7, 1956, in Ypsilanti, Michigan) is an American figure skater. She competed in ice dance with Richard Dalley at the 1984 Winter Olympics. Prior to ice dancing, Carol and her partner Richard Dalley were competitive roller figure skaters and competed out of the Riverside Skating Club in Livonia, Michigan.

== Results ==
(with Richard Dalley)

Event	1977–78	1978–79	1979–80	1980–81	1981–82	1982–83	1983–84
Winter Olympic Games							5th
World Championships	8th	11th		6th	5th		8th
U.S. Championships	2nd	2nd	3rd	2nd	2nd	3rd	2nd
Skate America			6th				
Skate Canada International					1st		
NHK Trophy				1st		2nd	
Nebelhorn Trophy	2nd						
