= Richard Dalley =

American former competitive ice dancer

Richard John Dalley (born August 2, 1957) is an American former competitive ice dancer.

Born in Detroit, Michigan, he competed in ice dance with Carol Fox at the 1984 Winter Olympics. The dance team is probably the most decorated team never to have won the US Championships. Richard and his partner Carol Fox were competitive roller figure skaters prior to changing to ice skating. They competed out of the Riverside Skating Club in Livonia, Michigan.

== Results ==
(with Carol Fox)

| Event | 1977–78 | 1978–79 | 1979–80 | 1980–81 | 1981–82 | 1982–83 | 1983–84 |
|---|---|---|---|---|---|---|---|
| Winter Olympic Games | | | | | | | 5th |
| World Championships | 8th | 11th | | 6th | 5th | | 8th |
| U.S. Championships | 2nd | 2nd | 3rd | 2nd | 2nd | 3rd | 2nd |
| Skate America | | | 6th | | | | |
| Skate Canada International | | | | | 1st | | |
| NHK Trophy | | | | 1st | | 2nd | |
| Nebelhorn Trophy | 2nd | | | | | | |
