= Johnny Johns =

American figure skater (1951–2026)

Personal information
- Born: August 9, 1951
- Died: February 20, 2026 (aged 74) Naples, Florida, U.S.

Figure skating career
- Country: United States
- Partner: Melissa Militano; Mary Campbell; Emily Benenson; Laura Johnson
- Coach: Ronald Ludington
- Retired: c. 1975
Medal record
Representing United States
Figure skating: Ice dancing
North American Championships
Bronze medal – third place	1971 Peterborough	Ice dancing

Johnny Johns (August 9, 1951 – February 20, 2026) was an American figure skating competitor and coach. Competing in ice dancing with Mary Campbell, he became the 1973 national champion and finished 6th at the 1973 World Championships. Competing as a pair skater with Melissa Militano, he became a two-time (1974 and 1975) U.S. national champion and finished 6th at the 1975 World Championships.

== Background ==
Johns was born on August 9, 1951. He is from the Detroit area. For a number of years he split his time between skating and Little League Baseball, where he had developed the ability to pitch both left- and right-handed. He attended regular schools during his skating career and studied at the University of Delaware in the early 1970s.

== Skating career ==
=== Competitive ===
Johns began learning to skate as a family activity when he was eight years old. He learned how to do jumps in both directions and also developed a very smooth stroking style.

When his coach left the Detroit area, Johns began to work with Ronald Ludington, who insisted that he give up on baseball and concentrate of skating year-round. Ludington was responsible for pairing him up first with Mary Karen Campbell in dance, and then with Laurie Johnson in pairs.

Johns and Mary Campbell became the 1973 national champions in ice dancing. They competed together at three World Championships, achieving their highest placement, 6th, in 1973.

He and Melissa Militano won the U.S. national pairs' title in 1974 and 1975. They placed 8th at the 1974 World Championships and 6th in 1975.

=== Post-competitive ===
Johns coached at the Detroit Skating Club for 27 years before moving to the Arctic Edge Ice Arena in Canton, Michigan in 2006. He coached Marcy Hinzmann / Aaron Parchem to the Olympics and Steve Hartsell / Danielle Hartsell to a World Junior title. He also coached Brooke Castile / Ben Okolski and Tessa Virtue / Scott Moir. In January 2019, he relocated to the Hertz Arena in Estero, Florida.

Johns died of complications from knee surgery on February 20, 2026, at the age of 74.

== Results ==
=== Men's singles ===
National
Event	1971
U.S. Championships	6th

=== Pairs with Johnson and Benenson ===
National
Event	1971^{1}	1972^{1}	1973^{2}
U.S. Championships	8th	8th	3rd
^{1} With Laura Johnson^{2} With Emily Benenson

=== Pairs with Militano ===
International
Event	1974	1975
World Championships	8th	6th
National
U.S. Championships	1st	1st

=== Ice dancing with Campbell ===
International
Event	69–70	70–71	71–72	72–73
World Championships		10th	10th	6th
North American Champ.		3rd		
Nebelhorn Trophy				1st
National
U.S. Championships	6th	3rd	3rd	1st

== Sources ==
- Skatabase: 1970s Pairs
- Skatabase: 1970s Ice dancing
