= John Misha Petkevich =

American former figure skater (born 1949)

Personal information
- Full name: John Misha Petkevich
- Born: March 3, 1949 (age 77) Minneapolis, Minnesota, U.S.
- Height: 5 ft 9 in (1.74 m)

Figure skating career
- Country: United States
- Skating club: Great Falls FSC
Medal record
Men's figure skating
Representing United States
North American Championships
| Gold medal – first place | 1971 Peterborough | Men's singles |
| Bronze medal – third place | 1969 Oakland | Men's singles |

John Misha Petkevich (born March 3, 1949, in Minneapolis) is an American former figure skater. He is the 1971 U.S. national champion and North American champion. He placed 6th at the 1968 Winter Olympics and 5th at the 1972 Winter Olympics. His best finish at the World Championships was 4th in 1972; he placed 5th in 1969, 1970, and 1971. In 1972, he won the gold medal at the World University Games.

The son of a radiologist, Dr. Frank Michael Petkevich, and Delphine Marie (Proulx) Petkevich, Petkevich first tried skating at age two, but was eight years old when he began to actively pursue the sport, and age 14 when he became serious about competing. He grew up in Great Falls, Montana, where he was coached to the Olympic level by Arthur Bourke. He later worked with Gustave Lussi. Petkevich was known as a particularly dynamic free skater for his time. His emphasis on freer musical expression and less rigid body lines set him apart from most other men's singles competitors of his era. He has also been credited with innovating fashion for male competitors by wearing a more athletic costume of a jumpsuit and turtleneck sweater rather than the more formal suit-and-tie outfit that was otherwise universal in the 1960s. By the early 1970s, many other skaters had emulated Petkevich's costume style.

He earned a spot on the 1968 Olympic team at age 18 by edging out Scott Allan for third place at that year's U.S. Figure Skating championships. Fourth after the compulsory figures, he earned a standing ovation for a dramatic performance that included a jump he invented called the Bourkey, after his coach, described by Sports Illustrated as “jump in which he kicks sideways, whirls, arches and generally hangs around up in the air long enough to wash out a pair of sweat socks.”

Petkevich was the recipient of an unusual trophy. At the 1947 World Figure Skating Championships, Ulrich Salchow was particularly impressed by Dick Button's skating, and gave him one of his own trophies. Following the 1972 Olympics, Button passed on Salchow's trophy to Petkevich. In 2010, Petkevich passed the trophy to Paul Wylie, keeping alive the meaning of the trophy which is meant to reward a skater for having had a material impact on the sport.

While still a competitive skater, Petkevich attended Harvard University, and graduated in 1973. In 1970, while at Harvard, he founded An Evening with Champions, a long-running annual ice show that raises money to benefit the Jimmy Fund and Dana–Farber Cancer Institute. Following his skating career, Petkevich originally intended to go to medical school, but after attending University of Oxford as a Rhodes scholar, and studying virology, he earned a Ph.D. in cell biology in 1978. Petkevich studied music privately, was a Fellow in the Music Department at Harvard, and was composer-in-residence at Eliot House, Harvard. He has composed a clarinet quintet, a piano trio, a sonata for piano and a number of songs in different genre. Most of the compositions have been played in small concerts.

In 1983, he joined Hambrecht & Quist where he was Head of Healthcare Banking and a biotechnology analyst. From 1987 to 1989, he pursued healthcare investment banking. In 1989, he joined Robertson Stephens & Co. as Managing Director and served several roles including Head of Healthcare Banking and ultimately became Head of Investment Banking. He founded The Petkevich Group, a boutique advisory firm where he was chairman and CEO from 1998 to 2005. In 2006, he was a co-founder of BladeRock Capital, an investment firm that focused on life science companies. It made investments in undervalued public (and selectively, in private) companies, which are developing medical breakthrough products that address critical and severe unmet medical needs. In 2015, BladeRock Capital was renamed V2M Capital and was reorganized with Petkevich as the sole chief investment officer. As of 2021, Petkevich remains Chief Investment Officer at V2M Capital, LLC. On August 26, 2024, Petkevich co-founded XBL, Inc. along with Dr. Malcolm Gefter. He currently serves as Executive Chairman, President and Treasurer. The company is founded on two technology platforms, AI computational model and peptide medicinal chemistry platform, licensed from MIT.

Petkevich is on the board of trustees of the United States Figure Skating Foundation, serves as its President and Chairman. Previously, he served on the board of the San Francisco Opera, on the advisory board of the Gladstone Institute, and on the foundation board of UCSF.

Petkevich is married to Elisabeth Silby Petkevich and the couple has three children, Kathryn, Drew, and Nicky.

Petkevich is the author of Figure Skating: Championship Techniques (ISBN 0-452-26209-7), one of the standard reference works on figure skating technique. He has also served as a figure skating analyst for NBC, CBS, and ESPN.

== Results ==
| Event | 1965 | 1966 | 1967 | 1968 | 1969 | 1970 | 1971 | 1972 |
|---|---|---|---|---|---|---|---|---|
| Winter Olympics | | | | 6th | | | | 5th |
| World Championships | | | | | 5th | 5th | 5th | 4th |
| North American Championships | | | | | 3rd | | 1st | |
| U.S. Championships | 5th J. | 1st J. | 4th | 3rd | 2nd | 2nd | 1st | 2nd |
