= Gordon McKellen =

American figure skater (born 1953)

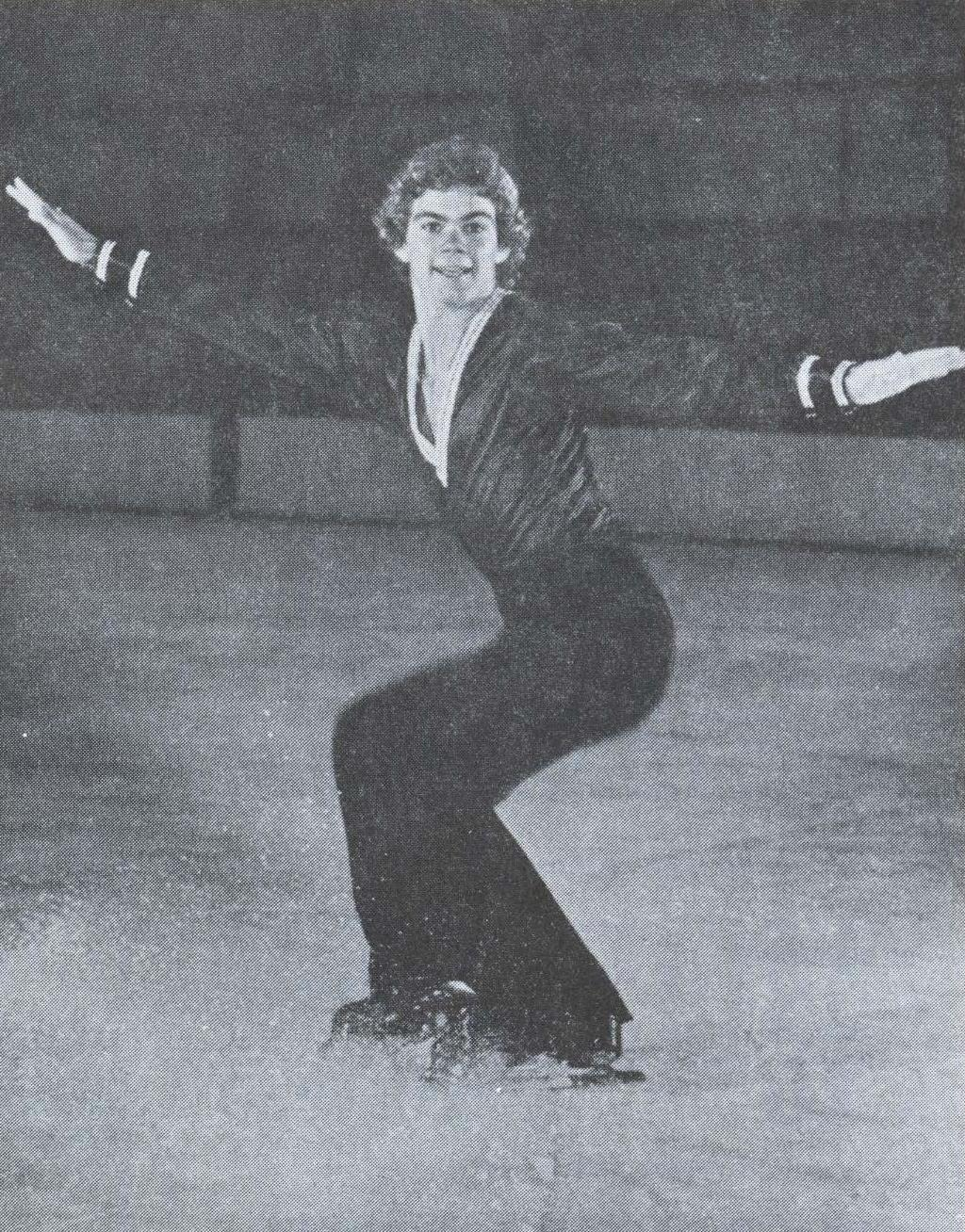
- McKellen circa 1973

Personal information
- Born: August 26, 1953 (age 73) Reading, Pennsylvania, U.S.

Figure skating career
- Country: United States
- Retired: 1975

Gordon Riley "Gordie" McKellen Jr. (born August 26, 1953) is an American former competitive figure skater. He is the 1973–75 U.S. national champion and placed tenth at the 1972 Winter Olympics.

== Personal life ==
McKellen was born on August 26, 1953, in Reading, Pennsylvania. His parents, Leila and Gordon "Tuffy" Sr., owned an ice rink, and his father was a member of the 1940s ice skating duo, the McKellen Brothers.

In 1977, McKellen married American figure skater Kath Malmberg, who gave birth to their two children in the 1980s.

== Career ==
McKellen won three consecutive U.S. national titles. He was selected to represent the United States at the 1972 Winter Olympics and finished tenth. His highest placement at the World Championships was 5th, in 1975.

Although other skaters had practiced triple axels before then, McKellen was the first skater to attempt them in public performances. He landed several in exhibition in 1974–1975, as King of the Lake Placid Winter Festival exhibition and during the exhibitions following his third National championship win in Providence. The triple axel was not landed in competition until Vern Taylor did it in 1978.

McKellen retired from competitive skating after the 1975 season after his coach, Slavka Kohout, left her position at the Wagon Wheel rink in Rockton, Illinois, where McKellen had been training. He toured with Toller Cranston's "The Ice Show" company after turning professional.

McKellen was inducted into the United States Figure Skating Hall of Fame in 1998.

In July 2001, he was banned for life from U.S. Figure Skating because of allegations of inappropriate behavior and actions with underage female skaters.

== Results ==
International
Event	64–65	65-66	66-67	69–70	70–71	71–72	72–73	73–74	74–75
Winter Olympics						10th			
World Champ.					9th	8th	7th	6th	5th
Prague Skate							1st		
National
U.S. Champ.	6th N	7th J	2nd J	6th	3rd	3rd	1st	1st	1st
N = Novice level; J = Junior level

== See also ==
- Skatabase: 1970s Worlds
- Skatabase: 1972 Olympics
- Hamilton, Scott (1999). Landing It, ISBN 1-57566-466-6.
