= Charlie Tickner =

American figure skater (born 1953)

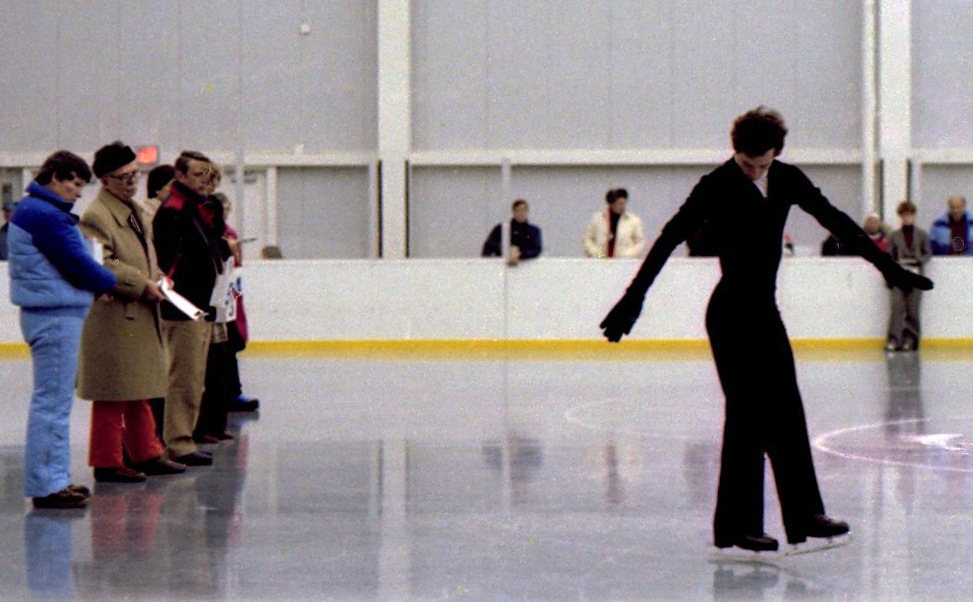
- Tickner executing a compulsory figure at the 1980 Winter Olympics

Personal information
- Born: November 13, 1953 (age 72) Lafayette, California, U.S.

Figure skating career
- Country: United States
Medal record
Men's figure skating
Representing United States
Olympic Games
Bronze medal – third place	1980 Lake Placid	Men's singles
World Championships
Bronze medal – third place	1980 Dortmund	Men's singles
Gold medal – first place	1978 Ottawa	Men's singles

Charles Frederick Tickner (born November 13, 1953, in Lafayette, California) is an American figure skater.

Tickner won the gold medal at the 1978 World Figure Skating Championships, skating to music from Georges Bizet's Carmen and Jules Massenet's Le Cid for his long program. He also won the bronze medal at the 1980 Winter Olympics and the 1980 World Championships.

He is married and has three sons, and he currently resides in the East Bay, California. He is now a private figure skating coach.

== Results ==
International
Event	69–70	70–71	71–72	72–73	73–74	74–75	75–76	76–77	77–78	78–79	79–80
Winter Olympics											3rd
World Championships								5th	1st	4th	3rd
Skate Canada						3rd			2nd	2nd	
Nebelhorn					2nd						
Prague Skate							1st				
St. Gervais					1st						
U.S. Championships	7th J	10th		6th	3rd	3rd	4th	1st	1st	1st	1st
