= Artistic Skating World Championships =

Highest level competition for artistic skating

The Artistic Skating World Championships ('Worlds') is an annual artistic roller skating competition sanctioned by World Skate (previously the International Roller Sports Federation; FIRS) in which elite figure skaters compete for the title of World Champion. First held in 1946, the event is regarded the most prestigious of the sport and a world title is considered to be the highest competitive achievement in artistic skating. Skaters compete in many different categories such as men's singles, ladies singles, pairs, and junior categories at the World Championships.

Due to the 2022 Russian invasion of Ukraine, World Skate banned Russian and Belarusian athletes and officials from its competitions, and will not stage any events in Russia or Belarus in 2022.

== Medalists ==
=== Senior Men's Combined (1947–2014) ===
Year	Location	Gold	Silver	Bronze
1947	(United States) Washington, D.C.	(United States) Donald Mounce	(Switzerland) Karl Peter	(Belgium) Fernand Leemans
1949	(Spain) Barcelona	(Switzerland) Peter Karl		
1951	(Italy) Turin	(West Germany) Freimut Stein		
1952	(West Germany) Dortmund	(West Germany) Freimut Stein		
1955	(Spain) Barcelona	(West Germany) Franz Nigel	(United States) William Ferraro	(West Germany) Herbert Beyer
1956	(Spain) Barcelona	(West Germany) Franz Nigel		
1958	(Italy) Bologna	(West Germany) Franz Nigel		
1959	(West Germany) Berlin	(West Germany) Karl-Heinz Losch		
1961	(Italy) Bologna	(West Germany) Karl-Heinz Losch		
1962	(United States) Miami	(West Germany) Karl-Heinz Losch		
1965	(Spain) Madrid	(West Germany) Hans-Dieter Dahmen		
1966	(West Germany) Essen	(West Germany) Karl-Heinz Losch		
1967	(United States) Birmingham	(West Germany) Hans-Dieter Dahmen		
1968	(Spain) Vigo	(United States) Jack Courtney		
1970	(United States) Lincoln	(West Germany) Michael Obrecht		
1971	(Spain) Barcelona	(West Germany) Michael Obrecht		
1972	(West Germany) Bremen	(West Germany) Michael Obrecht		
1973	(West Germany) Essen	(United States) Randy Dayney		
1974	(Spain) A Coruña	(West Germany) Michael Obrecht		
1975	(Australia) Brisbane	(Switzerland) Leonardo Lienhard		
1976	(Italy) Rome	(West Germany) Thomas Nieder		
1977	(Canada) Montreal	(West Germany) Thomas Nieder		
1978	(Portugal) Lisbon	(West Germany) Thomas Nieder		
1979	(West Germany) Altenau	(West Germany) Michael Butzke		
1980	(Colombia) Bogotá	(West Germany) Michael Butzke		
1981	(New Zealand) Nelson	(West Germany) Hunter Windham	(West Germany) Joachim Helmle	(Italy) Michele Biserni
1982	(West Germany) Bremerhaven	(West Germany) Michael Butzke	(West Germany) Joachim Helmle	(United Kingdom) Paul McIlhone
1983	(United States) Fort Worth	(West Germany) Joachim Helmle	(Italy) Michele Biserni	(East Germany) Thomas Scherhag
1984	(Japan) Tokyo	(Italy) Michele Biserni	(Italy) Michele Tolomini	(Canada) Jeff Brabant
1985	(Italy) Rimini	(Italy) Michele Biserni	(Italy) Michele Tolomini	
1986	(Colombia) Bogotá	(Italy) Michele Tolomini	(Italy) Michele Biserni	(Italy) Sandro Guerra
1987	(New Zealand) Auckland	(Italy) Sandro Guerra	(Italy) Samo Kokorovec	(Australia) Paul Irving
1988	(United States) Pensacola	(Italy) Sandro Guerra	(United States) Kevin Carroll	(Italy) Samo Kokorovec
1989	(Italy) Roccaraso	(Italy) Sandro Guerra	(Italy) Samo Kokorovec	(West Germany) Thomas Löhe
1990	(Germany) Hanau	(Italy) Samo Kokorovec	(Italy) Patrick Venerucci	(West Germany) Markus Kaiser
1991	(Australia) Sydney	(Italy) Sandro Guerra	(Italy) Samo Kokorovec	(West Germany) Markus Kaiser
1992	(United States) Tampa	(Italy) Sandro Guerra	(Italy) Samo Kokorovec	(Spain) Ricardo Planiol
1993	(France) Bordeaux	(Italy) Samo Kokorovec	(Italy) Mauro Mazzoni	(Australia) Jayson Sutcliffe
1994	(Italy) Salsomaggiore	(United Kingdom) Lee Taylor	(Italy) Emiliano Tigani	(Australia) Jayson Sutcliffe
1995	(Colombia) San Juan de Girón	(Australia) Jayson Sutcliffe	(United Kingdom) Lee Taylor	(Italy) Francesco Cerisola
1996	(Argentina) Mar Del Plata	(Italy) Francesco Cerisola	(Argentina) Walter Iglesias	(Australia) Jayson Sutcliffe
1997	(Spain) Reus	(Italy) Mauro Mazzoni	(Italy) Francesco Cerisola	(Germany) Adrian Stolzenberg
1998	(Colombia) Bogotá	(Italy) Daniele Tofani	(Italy) Mauro Mazzoni	(Germany) Adrian Stolzenberg
1999	(Australia) Gold Coast	(Germany) Adrian Stolzenberg	(Italy) Daniele Tofani	(Italy) Mauro Mazzoni
2000	(United States) Springfield	(Germany) Adrian Stolzenberg	(Italy) Daniele Tofani	(Italy) Mauro Mazzoni
2001	(Italy) Florence	(Italy) Leonardo Pancani	(Italy) Luca D'Alisera	(Germany) Frank Albiez
2002	(Germany) Wuppertal	(Germany) Frank Albiez	(Italy) Luca D'Alisera	(Spain) José Ramón
2003	(Argentina) Buenos Aires	(Italy) Luca D'Alisera	(Italy) Leonardo Pancani	(Germany) Frank Albiez
2004	(United States) Fresno	(Italy) Luca D'Alisera	(Germany) Frank Albiez	(Italy) Pietro Mazzetti
2005	(Italy) Rome	(Italy) Roberto Riva	(Italy) Luca D'Alisera	(Germany) Daniel Müller
2006	(Spain) Murcia	(Italy) Roberto Riva	(Italy) Luca D'Alisera	(Germany) Frank Albiez
2007	(Australia) Gold Coast	(Italy) Roberto Riva	(Germany) Christian von Känel	(Spain) Carles Gasset
2008	(Chinese Taipei) Kaohsiung	(Italy) Roberto Riva	(Switzerland) Raphael Egli	(Spain) Carles Gasset
2009	(Germany) Freiburg	(Germany) Markus Lell	(Spain) Carles Gasset	(Switzerland) Raphael Egli
2010	(Portugal) Portimão	(Germany) Markus Lell	(Italy) Marco Santucci	(Germany) Christian von Känel
2011	(Brazil) Brasília	(Germany) Markus Lell	(Brazil) Gustavo Casado	(Italy) Marco Santucci
2012	(New Zealand) Auckland	(Germany) Markus Lell	(Brazil) Gustavo Casado	(France) Pierre Mériel
2013	(Chinese Taipei) Taipei	(Italy) Simone Porzi	(Germany) Markus Lell	(Brazil) Gustavo Casado
2014	(Spain) Reus	(Brazil) Gustavo Casado	(France) Pierre Mériel	(Italy) Enrico Sansone

=== Senior Ladies Combined (1947–2014) ===
Year	Location	Gold	Silver	Bronze
1947	(United States) Washington, D.C.	(Switzerland) Ursula Wehrli	(United States) June Henrich	(United States) Charlotte Ludwig
1949	(Spain) Barcelona	(Italy) Franca Rio		
1951	(Italy) Turin	(Italy) Franca Rio		
1952	(West Germany) Dortmund	(West Germany) Lotte Cadenbach		
1955	(Spain) Barcelona	(West Germany) Helene Koch	(West Germany) Lotte Cadenbach	(Belgium) Diana Fret
1956	(Spain) Barcelona	(West Germany) Rita Blumenberg		
1958	(Italy) Bologna	(West Germany) Marika Lilius		
1959	(West Germany) Berlin	(West Germany) Ute Kitz		
1961	(Italy) Bologna	(West Germany) Marlies Fahse		
1962	(United States) Miami	(Switzerland) Fraenzi Schmidt		
1965	(Spain) Madrid	(West Germany) Astrid Bader		
1966	(West Germany) Essen	(West Germany) Astrid Bader		
1967	(United States) Birmingham	(West Germany) Astrid Bader		
1968	(Spain) Vigo	(West Germany) Astrid Bader		
1970	(United States) Lincoln	(West Germany) Christine Kieutzfeld		
1971	(Spain) Barcelona	(West Germany) Petra Haeusler		
1972	(West Germany) Bremen	(West Germany) Petra Haeusler		
1973	(West Germany) Essen	(West Germany) Sigrid Muellenbach		
1974	(Spain) A Coruña	(West Germany) Sigrid Muellenbach		
1975	(Australia) Brisbane	(West Germany) Sigrid Muellenbach		
1976	(Italy) Rome	(United States) Natalie Dunn		
1977	(Canada) Montreal	(United States) Natalie Dunn		
1978	(Portugal) Lisbon	(United States) Natalie Dunn		
1979	(West Germany) Altenau	(West Germany) Petra Schneider		
1980	(Colombia) Bogotá	(West Germany) Petra Emert		
1981	(New Zealand) Nelson	(West Germany) Petra Emert		
1982	(West Germany) Bremerhaven	(West Germany) Claudia Bruppacher		
1983	(United States) Fort Worth	(West Germany) Petra Schneider		
1984	(Japan) Tokyo	(West Germany) Claudia Bruppacher	(West Germany) Petra Schneider	
1985	(Italy) Rimini	(Italy) Chiara Sartori	(West Germany) Frederique Florentin	(Italy) Sara Tomassini
1986	(Colombia) Bogotá	(Italy) Chiara Sartori	(Italy) Sara Tomassini	(Italy) Rafaella del Vinaccio
1987	(New Zealand) Auckland	(Italy) Chiara Sartori	(Italy) Rafaella del Vinaccio	(Italy) Sara Tomassini
1988	(United States) Pensacola	(Italy) Rafaella del Vinaccio	(West Germany) Frederique Florentin	(West Germany) Marina Kielmann
1989	(Italy) Roccaraso	(Italy) Rafaella del Vinaccio	(Italy) Sabrina Versalli	(West Germany) Marina Kielmann
1990	(Germany) Hanau	(Italy) Rafaella del Vinaccio	(West Germany) Marina Kielmann	(Italy) Sabrina Versalli
1991	(Australia) Sydney	(Italy) Rafaella del Vinaccio	(United States) April Dayney	(Italy) Simona Allori
1992	(United States) Tampa	(Italy) Rafaella del Vinaccio	(United States) April Dayney	(Italy) Simona Allori
1993	(France) Bordeaux	(Italy) Letizia Tinghi	(Italy) Simona Allori	(United States) Jennifer Rodriguez
1994	(Italy) Salsomaggiore	(Italy) Letizia Tinghi	(Italy) Silvia Piersigilli	(Spain) Antela Parada
1995	(Colombia) San Juan de Girón	(Italy) Letizia Tinghi	(Italy) Silvia Piersigilli	(Spain) Antela Parada
1996	(Argentina) Mar Del Plata	(Italy) Giusi Locane	(Spain) Antela Parada	(France) Laure Bourguignon
1997	(Spain) Reus	(Italy) Sabrini Tomassini	(Spain) Antela Parada	(Germany) Elke Dederichs
1998	(Colombia) Bogotá	(Germany) Elke Dederichs	(Italy) Christina Bartolozzi	(Italy) Sabrini Tomassini
1999	(Australia) Gold Coast	(Italy) Elisa Faccioti	(Spain) Natalia Ridao	(Germany) Elke Dederichs
2000	(United States) Springfield	(Italy) Elisa Faccioti	(Italy) Christina Bartolozzi	(Germany) Elke Dederichs
2001	(Italy) Florence	(Italy) Elisa Faccioti	(Italy) Christina Bartolozzi	(Portugal) Liliana Andrade
2002	(Germany) Wuppertal	(Italy) Tanja Romano	(Germany) Patricia Stolzenberg	(Portugal) Diana Ribeiro
2003	(Argentina) Buenos Aires	(Italy) Tanja Romano	(Germany) Patricia Stolzenberg	(Portugal) Diana Ribeiro
2004	(United States) Fresno	(Italy) Tanja Romano	(Germany) Patricia Stolzenberg	(Portugal) Diana Ribeiro
2005	(Italy) Rome	(Italy) Tanja Romano	(Portugal) Liliana Andrade	(Portugal) Diana Ribeiro
2006	(Spain) Murcia	(Italy) Tanja Romano	(Spain) Monica Ribeiro	(Portugal) Liliana Andrade
2007	(Australia) Gold Coast	(Italy) Tanja Romano	(Slovenia) Lucija Mlinaric	(Germany) Sandra Woyciechowski
2008	(Chinese Taipei) Kaohsiung	(Italy) Tanja Romano		
2009	(Germany) Freiburg	(Italy) Tanja Romano	(Germany) Inga Knorr	(Slovenia) Lucija Mlinaric
2010	(Portugal) Portimão	(Italy) Debora Sbei	(Italy) Tanja Romano	(Switzerland) Fabienne Bachmann
2011	(Brazil) Brasília	(Italy) Debora Sbei	(Slovenia) Lucija Mlinric	(Spain) Carla Pey Gómez
2012	(New Zealand) Auckland	(Italy) Debora Sbei	(Slovenia) Lucija Mlinric	(Slovenia) Nika Arcon
2013	(Chinese Taipei) Taipei	(Italy) Debora Sbei	(Italy) Silvia Nemesio	(Argentina) Elizabeth Soler
2014	(Spain) Reus	(Italy) Debora Sbei	(Slovenia) Lucija Mlinric	(Italy) Silvia Nemesio

=== Senior Men's Figures ===
Year	Location	Gold	Silver	Bronze
1980	(Colombia) Bogotá	(West Germany) Michael Butzke		
1981	(New Zealand) Nelson	(West Germany) Michael Butzke		
1982	(West Germany) Bremerhaven	(West Germany) Michael Butzke		(United States) Tony Saint-Jacques
1983	(United States) Fort Worth	(United States) Tony Saint-Jacques		
1984	(Japan) Tokyo	(United States) Tony Saint-Jacques	(Italy) Michele Biserni	(Italy) Michele Tolomini
1985	(Italy) Rimini	(Italy) Michele Biserni		(United States) Scott Myers
1986	(Colombia) Bogotá	(United States) Skip Clinton		
1987	(New Zealand) Auckland	(United States) Kevin Carroll	(United States) Skip Clinton	
1988	(United States) Pensacola	(United States) Kevin Carroll		(United States) Justin Bates
1989	(Italy) Roccaraso	(Italy) Sandro Guerra	(United States) Skip Clinton	(United States) Justin Bates
1990	(Germany) Hanau	(United States) Justin Bates	(Italy) Samo Kokorovec	(Germany) Markus Kaiser
1991	(Australia) Sydney	(United States) Justin Bates	(Italy) Sandro Guerra	(United States) Steven Findlay
1992	(United States) Tampa	(Italy) Sandro Guerra	(United States) Steven Findlay	(United States) Justin Bates
1993	(France) Bordeaux	(United States) Steven Findlay	(United States) Justin Bates	(Italy) Samo Kokorovec
1994	(Italy) Salsomaggiore	(United States) Steven Findlay	(United States) Richard Saucedo	(United States) Ron Zander
1995	(Colombia) San Juan de Girón	(United States) Steven Findlay	(United States) Ron Zander	(Italy) Francesco Cerisola
1996	(Argentina) Mar Del Plata	(United States) Steven Findlay	(United States) Ron Zander	(Italy) Francesco Cerisola
1997	(Spain) Reus	(Italy) Francesco Cerisola	(Italy) Daniele Tofani	(Germany) Stefan Müller
1998	(Colombia) Bogotá	(Germany) Stefan Müller	(Germany) Adrian Stolzenberg	(Italy) Daniele Tofani
1999	(Australia) Gold Coast	(Germany) Adrian Stolzenberg	(Italy) Daniele Tofani	(Germany) Frank Albiez
2000	(United States) Springfield	(Italy) Leonardo Pancani	(United States) John Jacobson	(United States) Jason Nelson
2001	(Italy) Florence	(Germany) Daniel Müller	(Germany) Frank Albiez	(Italy) Leonardo Pancani
2002	(Germany) Wuppertal	(Italy) Leonardo Pancani	(Italy) Daniele Tofani	(Germany) Daniel Müller
2003	(Argentina) Buenos Aires	(Italy) Leonardo Pancani	(Germany) Frank Albiez	(United States) Jason Nelson
2004	(United States) Fresno	(Germany) Frank Albiez	(Italy) Pietro Mazzetti	(Germany) Daniel Müller
2005	(Italy) Rome	(United States) Kyle Turley	(Germany) Frank Albiez	(Germany) Daniel Müller
2006	(Spain) Murcia	(Italy) Roberto Riva	(United States) Kyle Turley	(Germany) Frank Albiez
2007	(Australia) Gold Coast	(Italy) Roberto Riva	(United States) Kyle Turley	(Germany) Christian von Känel
2008	(Chinese Taipei) Kaohsiung	(Italy) Roberto Riva	(Switzerland) Raphael Egli	(Germany) Christian von Känel
2009	(Germany) Freiburg	(Italy) Marco Santucci	(Italy) Andrea Poli	(United States) Kyle Turley
2010	(Portugal) Portimão	(Italy) Andrea Poli	(United States) Kyle Turley	(Italy) Marco Santucci
2011	(Brazil) Brasília	(Italy) Andrea Poli	(Germany) Markus Lell	(Italy) Elis Carriero
2012	(New Zealand) Auckland	(Italy) Elis Carriero	(Argentina) Luis De Mattia	(Italy) Marco Santucci
2013	(Chinese Taipei) Taipei	(Germany) Markus Lell	(Argentina) Luis De Mattia	(Italy) Simone Porzi
2014	(Spain) Reus	(Argentina) Luis De Mattia	(Germany) Markus Lell	(Italy) Simone Porzi
2015	(Colombia) Cali	(Argentina) Luis De Mattia	(Germany) Markus Lell	(Italy) Marco Santucci
2016	(Italy) Novara	(Germany) Markus Lell	(Italy) Marco Santucci	(Argentina) Luis De Mattia
2017	(China) Nanjing	(Brazil) Felipe Werle	(Italy) Marco Santucci	(Argentina) Luis De Mattia
2018	(France) La Roche-sur-Yon	(Germany) Aaron Wunder	(Argentina) Luis De Mattia	(Germany) Tim Jendricke
2019	(Spain) Barcelona	(Italy) Davide Arminchiardi	(Brazil) Felipe Werle	(Germany) Aaron Wunder
2021	(Paraguay) Asunción	(Colombia) Brayan Carreño	(Italy) Mirco Schiavoni	(Brazil) Felipe Werle

=== Senior Ladies Figures (1980–2021) ===
Year	Location	Gold	Silver	Bronze
1980	(Colombia) Bogotá	(West Germany) Petra Emert		
1981	(New Zealand) Nelson	(West Germany) Petra Emert		
1982	(West Germany) Bremerhaven	(West Germany) Claudia Bruppacher		
1983	(United States) Fort Worth	(West Germany) Claudia Bruppacher		
1984	(Japan) Tokyo	(West Germany) Claudia Bruppacher		
1985	(Italy) Rimini	(Italy) Chiara Sartori		
1986	(Colombia) Bogotá	(Italy) Chiara Sartori		
1987	(New Zealand) Auckland	(Italy) Chiara Sartori		
1988	(United States) Pensacola	(West Germany) Frederique Florentin		
1989	(Italy) Roccaraso	(United States) Lynn Suwinski		
1990	(Germany) Hanau	(Italy) Raffaella del Vinaccio		
1991	(Australia) Sydney	(Italy) Raffaella del Vinaccio		
1992	(United States) Tampa	(Italy) Raffaella del Vinaccio		
1993	(France) Bordeaux	(Italy) Letizia Tinghi		
1994	(Italy) Salsomaggiore	(United States) April Daney		
1995	(Colombia) San Juan de Girón	(Italy) Letizia Tinghi		
1996	(Argentina) Mar Del Plata	(United States) Angie Maffei		
1997	(Spain) Reus	(Italy) Letizia Tinghi		
1998	(Colombia) Bogotá	(Argentina) María Giannatassio		
1999	(Australia) Gold Coast	(United States) April Daney		
2000	(United States) Springfield	(United States) April Daney		
2001	(Italy) Florence	(Italy) Elisa Faccioti		
2002	(Germany) Wuppertal	(Italy) Elisa Faccioti	(Germany) Nathalie Heinz	(United States) Tracey Wilson
2003	(Argentina) Buenos Aires	(Germany) Nathalie Heinz	(Italy) Cristina Giulianini	(Germany) Constanze Hobfeld
2004	(United States) Fresno	(Germany) Nathalie Heinz		
2005	(Italy) Rome	(Italy) Cristina Giulianini		
2006	(Spain) Murcia	(Germany) Sandra Woyciechowski	(Italy) Cristina Giulianini	(Spain) Mónica Gimeno Coma
2007	(Australia) Gold Coast	(Germany) Sandra Woyciechowski	(Italy) Cristina Giulianini	(Italy) Candida Cocchi
2008	(Chinese Taipei) Kaohsiung	(Germany) Sandra Woyciechowski		
2009	(Germany) Freiburg	(Germany) Julia Woyciechowski	(Italy) Elisa Giunti	(Germany) Sandra Woyciechowski
2010	(Portugal) Portimão	(Germany) Julia Woyciechowski	(Italy) Elisa Giunti	(Germany) Sandra Woyciechowski
2011	(Brazil) Brasília	(Argentina) María Emilia Albertarelli	(Argentina) Mariángeles Mantuano	(Germany) Sandra Woyciechowski
2012	(New Zealand) Auckland	(Argentina) Mariángeles Mantuano	(Argentina) Anabella Mendoz	(Italy) Debora Sbei
2013	(Chinese Taipei) Taipei	(Argentina) Mariángeles Mantuano	(Italy) Elisa Giunti	(Argentina) Elizabeth Soler
2014	(Spain) Reus	(Argentina) Mariángeles Mantuano	(Argentina) Anabella Mendoz	(Italy) Debora Sbei
2015	(Colombia) Cali	(Argentina) Anabella Mendoz	(Italy) Cristina Berti	(Italy) Giada Cavataio
2016	(Italy) Novara	(Argentina) Anabella Mendoz	(Italy) Giada Cavataio	(Argentina) Elizabeth Soler
2017	(China) Nanjing	(Argentina) Anabella Mendoz	(Italy) Giada Cavataio	(Argentina) Elizabeth Soler
2018	(France) La Roche-sur-Yon	(Italy) Giada Cavalaio	(Argentina) Anabella Mendoz	(Argentina) Giselle Soler
2019	(Spain) Barcelona	(Italy) Chiara Trentini	(Italy) Elettra Signorini	(Italy) Elena Donadella
2021	(Paraguay) Asunción	(Argentina) Giselle Soler	(Argentina) Anabella Mendoz	(Colombia) Astrid Carolina Báez

=== Senior Men's Freeskating ===
Year	Location	Gold	Silver	Bronze
1980	(Colombia) Bogotá	(United States) Kelly Mahon		(United States) Michael Glatz
1981	(New Zealand) Nelson	(United States) Tim McGuire		
1982	(West Germany) Bremerhaven	(United States) Tim McGuire		(United States) Rick Monturo
1983	(United States) Fort Worth	(United States) Tim McGuire	(United States) Scott Cohen	
1984	(Japan) Tokyo	(Italy) Michele Biserni	(Italy) Michele Sartorato	(United States) Bryan Denney
1985	(Italy) Rimini	(United States) Scott Cohen		(United States) Gregg Smith
1986	(Colombia) Bogotá	(United States) Scott Cohen	(United States) Gregg Smith	
1987	(New Zealand) Auckland	(United States) Gregg Smith	(United States) Scott Cohen	(United States) David DeMotte
1988	(United States) Pensacola	(United States) Gregg Smith		(United States) David DeMotte
1989	(Italy) Roccaraso	(United States) Scott Cohen	(Italy) Sandro Guerra	(United States) David DeMotte
1990	(Germany) Hanau	(United States) Scott Cohen	(Australia) Jayson Sutcliffe	(Italy) Patrick Venerucci
1991	(Australia) Sydney	(United States) Scott Cohen	(Italy) Sandro Guerra	(Italy) Patrick Venerucci
1992	(United States) Tampa	(United States) Heath Medeiros	(Australia) Jayson Sutcliffe	(United States) Eric Anderson
1993	(France) Bordeaux	(United States) Heath Medeiros	(United States) Eric Anderson	(Australia) Jayson Sutcliffe
1994	(Italy) Salsomaggiore	(United States) Heath Medeiros	(United States) Eric Anderson	(Australia) Jayson Sutcliffe
1995	(Colombia) San Juan de Girón	(Australia) Jayson Sutcliffe	(United States) Eric Anderson	(Argentina) Walter Iglesias
1996	(Argentina) Mar Del Plata	(Colombia) Edwin Guevara	(Argentina) Walter Iglesias	(United States) Eric Anderson
1997	(Spain) Reus	(United States) Eric Anderson	(Italy) Mauro Mazzoni	(Italy) Luca Lallai
1998	(Colombia) Bogotá	(Colombia) Edwin Guevara	(Italy) Mauro Mazzoni	(Argentina) Walter Iglesias
1999	(Australia) Gold Coast	(Italy) Luca Lallai	(Italy) Mauro Mazzoni	(Germany) Adrian Stolzenberg
2000	(United States) Springfield	(Italy) Luca Lallai	(United States) Eric Anderson	(Italy) Mauro Mazzoni
2001	(Italy) Florence	(Italy) Luca Lallai	(Italy) Luca D'Alisera	(Argentina) Daniel Arriola
2002	(Germany) Wuppertal	(Italy) Luca Lallai	(Italy) Luca D'Alisera	(Argentina) Daniel Arriola
2003	(Argentina) Buenos Aires	(Italy) Luca D'Alisera	(Italy) Andrea Barbieri	(Argentina) Daniel Arriola
2004	(United States) Fresno	(Italy) Luca D'Alisera	(Italy) Andrea Barbieri	(Argentina) Daniel Arriola
2005	(Italy) Rome	(Italy) Roberto Riva	(Italy) Andrea Barbieri	(Italy) Luca D'Alisera
2006	(Spain) Murcia	(Italy) Luca D'Alisera	(Italy) Roberto Riva	(Argentina) Daniel Arriola
2007	(Australia) Gold Coast	(Italy) Roberto Riva	(Italy) Andrea Barbieri	(Argentina) Daniel Arriola
2008	(Chinese Taipei) Kaohsiung	(Italy) Roberto Riva	(Italy) Andrea Barbieri	(Brazil) Marcel Stürmer
2009	(Germany) Freiburg	(Italy) Andrea Barbieri	(Italy) Pierluca Tocco	(Argentina) Daniel Arriola
2010	(Portugal) Portimão	(Italy) Andrea Barbieri	(Argentina) Daniel Arriola	(Brazil) Marcel Stürmer
2011	(Brazil) Brasília	(Italy) Dario Betti	(Brazil) Marcel Stürmer	(Italy) Andrea Aracu
2012	(New Zealand) Auckland	(Italy) Dario Betti	(Brazil) Marcel Stürmer	(Germany) Markus Lell
2013	(Chinese Taipei) Taipei	(Brazil) Gustavo Casado	(Italy) Andrea Girotto	(Italy) Simone Porzi
2014	(Spain) Reus	(Italy) Alessandro Amadesi	(Brazil) Gustavo Casado	(Italy) Andrea Girotto
2015	(Colombia) Cali	(Italy) Andrea Girotto	(Italy) Luca Lucaroni	(Brazil) Gustavo Casado
2016	(Italy) Novara	(Italy) Luca Lucaroni	(Italy) Alessandro Amadesi	(Italy) Andrea Girotto
2017	(China) Nanjing	(Italy) Luca Lucaroni	(Italy) Andrea Girotto	(Italy) Alessandro Amadesi
2018	(France) La Roche-sur-Yon	(Italy) Luca Lucaroni	(Spain) Pere Marsinyach	(Italy) Alessandro Amadesi
2019	(Spain) Barcelona	(Italy) Luca Lucaroni	(Spain) Pere Marsinyach	(Spain) Sergio Canales
2021	(Paraguay) Asunción	(Spain) Pau García	(Italy) Luca Lucaroni	(Italy) Alessandro Liberatore
2022	(Argentina) Buenos Aires	(Spain) Pau García	(Italy) Alessandro Liberatore	(Spain) Héctor Díez
2023	(Colombia) Ibagué	(Spain) Pau García	(Spain) Kilian Gomis	(Portugal) Diogo Craveiro
2024	(Italy) Rimini	(Italy) Alessandro Liberatore	(Portugal) Diogo Craveiro	(Spain) Lucas Yañéz
2025	(China) Beijing	(Spain) Héctor Díez	(Spain) Arnau Pérez	(Portugal) Diogo Craveiro
2026	(Paraguay) Asunción	(Spain) Guillermo Gómez	(Spain) Unai Cereijo	(Brazil) Erik Leite

=== Senior Ladies Freeskating ===
Year	Location	Gold	Silver	Bronze
1980	(Colombia) Bogotá	(United States) Anna Conklin		
1981	(New Zealand) Nelson	(United States) Tina Kneisley		
1982	(West Germany) Bremerhaven	(United States) Kathleen O'Brien		
1983	(United States) Fort Worth	(United States) Tina Kneisley		
1984	(Japan) Tokyo	(United States) Tina Kneisley		
1985	(Italy) Rimini	(Italy) Chiara Sartori		
1986	(Colombia) Bogotá	(Italy) Chiara Sartori		
1987	(New Zealand) Auckland	(Italy) Chiara Sartori		
1988	(United States) Pensacola	(Italy) Raffaella del Vinaccio		
1989	(Italy) Roccaraso	(Italy) Raffaella del Vinaccio		
1990	(Germany) Hanau	(Italy) Raffaella del Vinaccio		
1991	(Australia) Sydney	(Italy) Raffaella del Vinaccio		
1992	(United States) Tampa	(Italy) Raffaella del Vinaccio		
1993	(France) Bordeaux	(United States) Rechelle Hanson		
1994	(Italy) Salsomaggiore	(United States) Dezera Salas		
1995	(Colombia) San Juan de Girón	(Australia) Tammy Bryant		
1996	(Argentina) Mar Del Plata	(Spain) Antela Parada		
1997	(Spain) Reus	(Italy) Sabrini Tomassini		
1998	(Colombia) Bogotá	(Italy) Cristina Bartolozzi		
1999	(Australia) Gold Coast	(United States) Heather Mulkey		
2000	(United States) Springfield	(Italy) Erica Colaceci		
2001	(Italy) Florence	(United States) Heather Mulkey		
2002	(Germany) Wuppertal	(United States) Heather Mulkey	(Italy) Alice Baldan	(Spain) Laura Sánchez
2003	(Argentina) Buenos Aires	(Italy) Tanja Romano	(United States) Heather Mulkey	(Italy) Sonia Traversa
2004	(United States) Fresno	(Italy) Tanja Romano	(Italy) Sonia Traversa	(Argentina) Noemí Coronel
2005	(Italy) Rome	(Italy) Tanja Romano	(Spain) Laura Sánchez	(Italy) Annalisa Graziosi
2006	(Spain) Murcia	(Italy) Tanja Romano	(Argentina) Melisa Linsalata	(Italy) Ilenia Baldisser
2007	(Australia) Gold Coast	(Italy) Tanja Romano	(Spain) Laura Sánchez	(Italy) Ilenia Baldisser
2008	(Chinese Taipei) Kaohsiung	(Italy) Tanja Romano	(Italy) Rosalba Genito	(Italy) Annalisa Graziosi
2009	(Germany) Freiburg	(Italy) Debora Sbei	(Italy) Tanja Romano	(Italy) Cristina Trani
2010	(Portugal) Portimão	(Italy) Tanja Romano	(Italy) Debora Sbei	(Italy) Cristina Trani
2011	(Brazil) Brasília	(Italy) Debora Sbei	(Slovenia) Lucija Mlinarić	(Spain) Carla Pey
2012	(New Zealand) Auckland	(Italy) Debora Sbei	(Slovenia) Lucija Mlinarić	(Italy) Cristina Trani
2013	(Chinese Taipei) Taipei	(Italy) Cristina Trani	(Italy) Debora Sbei	(Italy) Silvia Nemesio
2014	(Spain) Reus	(Italy) Debora Sbei	(Italy) Silvia Lambruschi	(Slovenia) Lucija Mlinarić
2015	(Colombia) Cali	(Italy) Debora Sbei	(Italy) Silvia Nemesio	(Spain) Mónica Gimeno
2016	(Italy) Novara	(Italy) Silvia Nemesio	(Italy) Debora Sbei	(Spain) Mónica Gimeno
2017	(China) Nanjing	(Italy) Silvia Nemesio	(Spain) Mónica Gimeno	(Italy) Silvia Lambruschi
2018	(France) La Roche-sur-Yon	(Italy) Silvia Nemesio	(Italy) Letizia Ghiroldi	(Italy) Silvia Lambruschi
2019	(Spain) Barcelona	(Italy) Rebecca Tarlazzi	(Italy) Letizia Ghiroldi	(Spain) Carla Escrich
2021	(Paraguay) Asunción	(Italy) Rebecca Tarlazzi	(Spain) Andrea Silva	(Italy) Letizia Ghiroldi
2022	(Argentina) Buenos Aires	(Italy) Rebecca Tarlazzi	(Italy) Giada Luppi	(Spain) Carla Escrich
2023	(Colombia) Ibagué	(Italy) Rebecca Tarlazzi	(Spain) Carla Escrich	(Italy) Giada Luppi
2024	(Italy) Rimini	(Italy) Benedetta Altezza	(Italy) Gioia Fiori	(Spain) Elna Francés
2025	(China) Beijing	(Portugal) Madalena Costa	(Italy) Gioia Fiori	(Spain) Sira Bella
2026	(Paraguay) Asunción	(Portugal) Madalena Costa	(Spain) Sira Bella	(Spain) Elna Francés

=== Senior Men's Solo Dance ===
Year	Location	Gold	Silver	Bronze
2008	(Chinese Taipei) Kaohsiung	(Italy) Daniel Morandin		
2009	(Germany) Freiburg	(Portugal) Hugo Chapouto	(Italy) Daniel Morandin	(Italy) Diego Brun
2010	(Portugal) Portimão	(Portugal) Hugo Chapouto	(Italy) Daniel Morandin	(Italy) Diego Brun
2011	(Brazil) Brasília	(Italy) Daniel Morandin	(Italy) Alessandro Spigai	(France) Maxime Duponchel
2012	(New Zealand) Auckland	(Italy) Alessandro Spigai	(Italy) Daniel Morandin	(Portugal) Paulo Santos
2013	(Chinese Taipei) Taipei	(Italy) Alessandro Spigai	(Italy) Daniel Morandin	(Portugal) Ricardo Pinto
2014	(Spain) Reus	(Italy) Daniel Morandin	(Italy) Alessandro Spigai	(Portugal) Ricardo Pinto
2015	(Colombia) Cali	(Portugal) Ricardo Pinto	(Italy) Alessandro Spigai	(Italy) Daniel Morandin
2016	(Italy) Novara	(Italy) Daniel Morandin	(Portugal) Ricardo Pinto	(Italy) Alessandro Spigai
2017	(China) Nanjing	(Portugal) Ricardo Pinto	(Italy) Daniel Morandin	(Portugal) Pedro Walgode
2018	(France) La Roche-sur-Yon	(Portugal) Ricardo Pinto	(Italy) Daniel Morandin	(Italy) Alessandro Spigai
2019	(Spain) Barcelona	(Italy) Daniel Morandin	(Italy) Mattia Qualizza	(Portugal) Pedro Walgode
2021	(Paraguay) Asunción	(Spain) Llorenç Àlvarez	(Italy) Mattia Qualizza	(Portugal) Pedro Walgode
2022	(Argentina) Buenos Aires	(Colombia) Brayan Carreño	(Italy) Giovanni Piccolantonio	(Spain) Llorenç Àlvarez
2023	(Colombia) Ibagué	(Portugal) Pedro Walgode	(Spain) Llorenc Álvarez	(Colombia) Brayan Carreño
2024	(Italy) Rimini	(Italy) Gherardo Altieri	(Colombia) Brayan Carreño	(Italy) Giorgio Casella
2025	(China) Beijing	(Colombia) Brayan Carreño	(Italy) Gherardo Altieri	(Italy) Raoul Allegranti
2026	(Paraguay) Asunción	(Colombia) Brayan Carreño	(Argentina) Facundo Nieva	(Italy) Yuri Allegranti

=== Senior Ladies Solo Dance ===
Year	Location	Gold	Silver	Bronze
2009	(Germany) Freiburg	(Italy) Paola Fraschini	(France) Florence Gerber	(Italy) Valeria Camurri
2010	(Portugal) Portimão	(Italy) Paola Fraschini	(United States) Erin Ovens-Scalzitti	(France) Florence Gerber
2011	(Brazil) Brasília	(Italy) Paola Fraschini	(Italy) Valeria Camurri	(France) Florence Gerber
2012	(New Zealand) Auckland	(Italy) Paola Fraschini	(Italy) Anna Remondini	(United States) Nicole Leonard
2013	(Chinese Taipei) Taipei	(Italy) Paola Fraschini	(Italy) Anna Remondini	(Colombia) Viviana Osorio
2014	(Spain) Reus	(Italy) Paola Fraschini	(Italy) Silvia Stibilj	(Colombia) Viviana Osorio
2015	(Colombia) Cali	(Italy) Silvia Stibilj	(Italy) Anna Remondini	(Colombia) Viviana Osorio
2016	(Italy) Novara	(Italy) Silvia Stibilj	(Colombia) Viviana Osorio	(Argentina) Cecilia Liendo
2017	(China) Nanjing	(Italy) Silvia Stibilj	(Portugal) Ana Walgode	(Italy) Dalila Laneve
2018	(France) La Roche-sur-Yon	(Italy) Silvia Stibilj	(Italy) Rachele Campagnol	(Brazil) Ana Beatriz Morais
2019	(Spain) Barcelona	(Italy) Silvia Stibilj	(Portugal) Ana Walgode	(Italy) Anna Remondini
2021	(Paraguay) Asunción	(Spain) Natalia Baldizzone	(Germany) Emilia Zimermann	(Italy) Asya Sofia Testoni
2022	(Argentina) Buenos Aires	(Germany) Emilia Zimermann	(Spain) Natalia Baldizzone	(Italy) Asya Sofia Testoni
2023	(Colombia) Ibagué	(Italy) Roberta Sasso	(Spain) Natalia Baldizzone	(Paraguay) Erika Alarcón
2024	(Italy) Rimini	(Italy) Roberta Sasso	(Spain) Natalia Baldizzone	(Italy) Asya Sofia Testoni
2025	(China) Beijing	(Italy) Roberta Sasso	(Paraguay) Erika Alarcón	(Italy) Caterina Artoni
2026	(Paraguay) Asunción	(Italy) Roberta Sasso	(Spain) Natalia Baldizzone	(Brazil) Gabriella Giraldi

=== Senior Pairs ===
Year	Location	Gold	Silver	Bronze
1947	(United States) Washington, D.C.	(Belgium) Fernand Leemans / Elvire Collin	(United Kingdom) Kenneth Byrne / Jean Phetean	(Switzerland) Peter Karl / G. Müller
1949	(Spain) Barcelona	(United Kingdom) Kenneth Byrne / Jean Phetean		
1951	(Italy) Turin	(West Germany) Paul Falk / Ria Baran		
1952	(West Germany) Dortmund	(West Germany) Gunther Koch / Sigrid Knake		
1955	(Spain) Barcelona	(West Germany) Gunther Koch / Sigrid Knake	(West Germany) Werner Mensching / Rita Blumenberg	(United Kingdom) Albert Wilson / Sheila Anderson
1956	(Spain) Barcelona	(West Germany) Gunther Koch / Sigrid Knake		(New Zealand) William Mudford / Adrienne Mudford
1958	(Italy) Bologna	(West Germany) Werner Mensching / Rita Blumenberg		
1959	(West Germany) Berlin	(West Germany) Dieter Fingerle / Schneider		
1961	(Italy) Bologna	(West Germany) Werner Hofmann / Margot Ludolph		
1962	(United States) Miami	(West Germany) Werner Hofmann / Margot Ludolph		
1965	(Spain) Madrid	(West Germany) Dieter Fingerle / Uta Keller		
1966	(West Germany) Essen	(West Germany) Dieter Fingerle / Uta Keller		
1967	(United States) Birmingham	(West Germany) Dieter Fingerle / Uta Keller	(United States) Jack Courtney / Sheryl Truman	(West Germany) Eberhard Rausch / Brunnhilde Bassler
1968	(Spain) Vigo	(United States) Jack Courtney / Sheryl Truman		
1970	(United States) Lincoln	(United States) Ron Robovitsky / Gail Robovitsky		
1971	(Spain) Barcelona	(United States) Ron Robovitsky / Gail Robovitsky		
1972	(West Germany) Bremen	(United States) Ron Robovitsky / Gail Robovitsky		
1973	(West Germany) Essen	(United States) Louis Stovall / Vicki Handyside		
1974	(Spain) A Coruña	(United States) Ron Sabo / Sue McDonald		
1975	(Australia) Brisbane	(United States) Ron Sabo / Darlene Waters		
1976	(Italy) Rome	(United States) Ron Sabo / Darlene Waters		
1977	(Canada) Montreal	(United States) Ray Chappata / Karen Mejia		
1978	(Portugal) Lisbon	(United States) Pat Jones / Robbie Coleman		
1979	(West Germany) Altenau	(United States) Ray Chappata / Karen Mejia		
1980	(Colombia) Bogotá	(United States) Paul Price / Tina Kneisley		
1981	(New Zealand) Nelson	(United States) Paul Price / Tina Kneisley		
1982	(West Germany) Bremerhaven	(United States) Paul Price / Tina Kneisley		
1983	(United States) Fort Worth	(United States) John Arishita / Tammy Jerue		
1984	(Japan) Tokyo	(United States) John Arishita / Tammy Jerue		
1985	(Italy) Rimini	(United States) John Arishita / Tammy Jerue	(United States) Ken Benson / Robyn Young	(United States) Andy Roy / Jennifer Leck
1986	(Colombia) Bogotá	(United States) John Arishita / Tammy Jerue	(United States) Ken Benson / Robyn Young	(United States) Andy Roy / Jennifer Leck
1987	(New Zealand) Auckland	(Italy) Fabio Trevisani / Monica Mezzadri	(United States) Ken Benson / Robyn Young	(United States) Larry McGrew / Nicky Armstrong
1988	(United States) Pensacola	(Italy) Fabio Trevisani / Monica Mezzadri	(United States) David DeMotte/ T. Vaugh	(United States) Larry McGrew / Tina Jerue
1989	(Italy) Roccaraso	(United States) David DeMotte / Nicky Armstrong	(United States) Larry McGrew / Tina Jerue	(West Germany) Thomas Löhe / Nicole Friedel
1990	(Germany) Hanau	(United States) Larry McGrew / Tina Jerue	(United States) David DeMotte / Nicky Armstrong	(West Germany) Thomas Löhe / Nicole Friedel
1991	(Australia) Sydney	(United States) Larry McGrew / Tina Jerue	(Italy) Patrick Venerucci / Maura Ferri	(United States) John Fetrow / Jodi Davidson
1992	(United States) Tampa	(Italy) Patrick Venerucci / Maura Ferri	(United States) John Fetrow / Jodi Davidson	(United States) David DeMotte / Dezera Salas
1993	(France) Bordeaux	(Italy) Patrick Venerucci / Maura Ferri	(United States) John Fetrow / Jodi Davidson	(United States) David DeMotte / Dezera Salas
1994	(Italy) Salsomaggiore	(Italy) Patrick Venerucci / Beatrice Palazzi	(Italy) Alessandro D'Agostini / Eleonora Busono	(Italy) Flavio Mauricio Fisolo / Maria Gabriela Mugica
1995	(Colombia) San Juan de Girón	(Italy) Patrick Venerucci / Beatrice Palazzi	(Italy) Alessandro D'Agostini / Eleonora Busono	(Italy) Flavio Mauricio Fisolo / Maria Gabriela Mugica
1996	(Argentina) Mar Del Plata	(Italy) Patrick Venerucci / Beatrice Palazzi	(Italy) Flavio Mauricio Fisolo / Maria Gabriela Mugica	(Italy) Massimiliano Cotelli / Francesca Colombo
1997	(Spain) Reus	(Italy) Patrick Venerucci / Beatrice Palazzi	(Italy) Massimiliano Cotelli / Francesca Colombo	(United States) Jason Cohen / Bernadette Stringer
1998	(Colombia) Bogotá	(Italy) Patrick Venerucci / Beatrice Palazzi	(Italy) Flavio Mauricio Fisolo / Maria Gabriela Mugica	(Italy) Matteo Cecchetti / Laura Marcocchini
1999	(Australia) Gold Coast	(Italy) Patrick Venerucci / Beatrice Palazzi	(United States) Jason Cohen / Bernadette Stringer	(Italy) Giovanni Dallarda / Gaia Grandi
2000	(United States) Springfield	(Italy) Patrick Venerucci / Beatrice Palazzi	(Italy) Alessandro Bontempi / Francesca Colombo	(Italy) Flavio Mauricio Fisolo / Maria Gabriela Mugica
2001	(Italy) Florence	(Italy) Patrick Venerucci / Beatrice Palazzi	(Italy) Federico Degli Esposti / Marika Zanforlin	(Italy) Giovanni Dallarda / Gaia Grandi
2002	(Germany) Wuppertal	(Italy) Patrick Venerucci / Beatrice Palazzi	(Italy) Federico Degli Esposti / Marika Zanforlin	(Italy) Lorenzo Ronci / Carlotta Casadei
2003	(Argentina) Buenos Aires	(Italy) Federico Degli Esposti/Marika Zanforlin	(Italy) Giovanni Dallarda/Gaia Grandi	(Italy) Enrico Fabbri/Michela Ermetii
2004	(United States) Fresno	(Italy) Federico Degli Esposti/Marika Zanforlin	(Italy) Andrea Barbieri/Irene Nardo	(Italy) Giovanni Dallarda/Gaia Grandi
2005	(Italy) Rome	(Italy) Federico Degli Esposti/Marika Zanforlin	(Italy) Andrea Barbieri/Irene Nardo	(Italy) Enrico Fabbri/Laura Marzocchini
2006	(Spain) Murcia	(Italy) Federico Degli Esposti/Marika Zanforlin	(Italy) Enrico Fabbri/Laura Marzocchini	(Italy) Emanuele Cioffetti/Debora Sbei
2007	(Australia) Gold Coast	(Italy) Enrico Fabbri/Laura Marzocchini	(Italy) Matteo Guarise/Sara Venerucci	(Italy) Emanuele Cioffetti/Debora Sbei
2008	(Chinese Taipei) Kaohsiung	(Italy) Matteo Guarise/Sara Venerucci	(Italy) David Postiglione/Silvia Pasquini	(Italy) Danilo Decembrini/Francesca Lacarelli
2009	(Germany) Freiburg	(Italy) Daniele Ragazzi/Giulia Merli	(United States) Robert Hines/Aubrey Orcutt	(Argentina) Javier Anzil/Jesica Machín
2010	(Portugal) Portimão	(Italy) Danilo Decembrino/Sara Venerucci	(Italy) Enrico Fabbri/Laura Marzocchini	(United States) Robert Hines/Aubrey Orcutt
2011	(Brazil) Brasília	(Italy) Danilo Decembrino/Sara Venerucci	(Italy) Marco Garelli/Pamela Cappeler	(Italy) Enrico Fabbri/Laura Marzocchini
2012	(New Zealand) Auckland	(Italy) Danilo Decembrino/Sara Venerucci	(Italy) Daniele Ragazzi/Giulia Merli	(Italy) Marco Garelli/Pamela Cappeler
2013	(Chinese Taipei) Taipei	(Italy) Danilo Decembrino/Sara Venerucci	(Italy) Marco Garelli/Pamela Cappeler	(Argentina) Javier Anzil/Florencia Moyano
2014	(Spain) Reus	(Italy) Marco Garelli/Elena Lago	(Italy) Andrea Laurenzi/Federica Vico	(France) Nathanael Fouloy/Marine Portet
2015	(Colombia) Cali	(Italy) Luca Lucaroni/Rebecca Tarlazzi	(Italy) Marco Garelli/Elena Lago	(Italy) Mateo Rizzo/Sharon Giannini
2016	(Italy) Novara	(Italy) Luca Lucaroni/Rebecca Tarlazzi	(Italy) Marco Garelli/Sara Venerucci	(Italy) Nicola Merlani/Alessia Gambardelli
2017	(China) Nanjing	(Italy) Luca Lucaroni/Rebecca Tarlazzi	(Italy) Marco Garelli/Sara Venerucci	(Italy) Alberto Peruch/Isabella Genchi
2018	(France) La Roche-sur-Yon	(Italy) Luca Lucaroni/Rebecca Tarlazzi	(Italy) Mateo Rizzo/Sharon Giannini	(Italy) Alberto Peruch/Isabella Genchi
2019	(Spain) Barcelona	(Italy) Luca Lucaroni/Rebecca Tarlazzi	(Italy) Federico Rossi/Alice Esposito	(Italy) Marco Garelli/Gaia Colucci
2021	(Paraguay) Asunción	(Italy) Luca Lucaroni/Rebecca Tarlazzi	(Italy) Federico Rossi/Alice Esposito	(Italy) Federico Calzolari/Arianna Ferrentino
2022	(Argentina) Buenos Aires	(Italy) Luca Lucaroni/Rebecca Tarlazzi	(Italy) Federico Rossi/Alice Esposito	(Italy) Tommaso Cortini/Micol Mills
2023	(Colombia) Ibagué	(Italy) Federico Rossi / Alice Esposito	(Italy) Tomasso Cortini / Micol Mills	(Italy) Alessandro Bozzini / Alice Piazzi
2024	(Italy) Rimini	(Italy) Alice Esposito / Federico Rossi	(Italy) Micol Mills / Tommaso Cortini	(Italy) Caterina Locuratolo / Jacopo Russo
2025	(China) Beijing	(Italy) Tommaso Cortini / Micol Millis	(Italy) Josè Enrico Inglese / Angelica Polli	(United States) Michael Slowey / Susanna Spatz
2026	(Paraguay) Asunción	(Italy) Josè Enrico Inglese / Angelica Polli	(Italy) Tommaso Cortini / Micol Mills	(Italy) Alessandro Bozzini / Gloria Di Bella

=== Senior Couple Dance ===
Year	Location	Gold	Silver	Bronze
1947	(United States) Washington, D.C.	(United States) Fred Ludwig / Killip Gallagher	(United Kingdom) Kenneth Byrne / Jean Phetean	(United States) William Weicker / Patricia McIlwain
1949	(Spain) Barcelona	(United Kingdom) Kenneth Byrne / Jean Phetean		
1951	(Italy) Turin	(United Kingdom) Ellin / Mercer		
1952	(West Germany) Dortmund	(United Kingdom) Ellin / Mercer		
1955	(Spain) Barcelona	(West Germany) Karl-Heinz Beyer / Marga Schaefer	(West Germany) Gunther Koch / Sigrid Knake	(United Kingdom) Malcolm Whelan / Mary Grainger
1956	(Spain) Barcelona	(West Germany) Gunther Koch / Sigrid Knake		
1958	(Italy) Bologna	(United Kingdom) Cooper / Cooper		
1959	(West Germany) Berlin	(West Germany) Peter Kwiet / Rita Paucka		
1961	(Italy) Bologna	(West Germany) Peter Kwiet / Rita Kwiet		
1962	(United States) Miami	(United Kingdom) Colclough / Colclough		
1965	(Spain) Madrid	(United Kingdom) Colclough / Colclough		
1966	(West Germany) Essen	(West Germany) Hans-Jurgen Schamberger / Marta Schamberger		
1967	(United States) Birmingham	(West Germany) Hans-Jurgen Schamberger / Marta Schamberger		
1968	(Spain) Vigo	(United States) Donald Rudaliewicz / Rita Smith		
1970	(United States) Lincoln	(United States) Richard Horne / Jane Pankey		
1971	(Spain) Barcelona	(United States) Richard Horne / Jane Pankey		
1972	(West Germany) Bremen	(United States) Thomas Straker / Bonnie Lambert		
1973	(West Germany) Essen	(United States) James Stephens / Jane Puracchio		
1974	(Spain) A Coruña	(West Germany) Doensdorf / Henke		
1975	(Australia) Brisbane	(United States) Kerry Cavazzi / Jane Puracchio		
1976	(Italy) Rome	(United States) Kerry Cavazzi / Jane Puracchio		
1977	(Canada) Montreal	(United States) Dan Little / Fleurette Arsenault		
1978	(Portugal) Lisbon	(United States) Dan Little / Fleurette Arsenault		
1979	(West Germany) Altenau	(United States) Dan Little / Fleurette Arsenault		
1980	(Colombia) Bogotá	(West Germany) Achenbach / Carels		
1981	(New Zealand) Nelson	(United States) Mark Howard / Cindy Smith		
1982	(West Germany) Bremerhaven	(United States) Mark Howard / Cindy Smith		
1983	(United States) Fort Worth	(United States) David Golub / Angie Fabiano		
1984	(Japan) Tokyo	(United States) David Golub / Angie Fabiano		
1985	(Italy) Rimini	(West Germany) Martin Hauss / Andrea Steudte	(United States) Scott Myers / Anna Danks	(United States) Rob Galambos / Jeannie Parks
1986	(Colombia) Bogotá	(United States) Scott Myers / Anna Danks	(West Germany) Peter Wulf / Michaela Mitzlaff	(Italy) Roberto Stanzani / Rossani Rinaldi
1987	(New Zealand) Palmerston	(United States) Rolf Ferando / Lori Walsh	(West Germany) Peter Wulf / Michaela Mitzlaff	(United States) Allen Desterhaft / Julie Hider
1988	(United States) Pensacola	(West Germany) Peter Wulf / Michaela Mitzlaff	(United States) Greg Goody / Jodee Viola	(United States) Allen Desterhaft / Julie Hider
1989	(Italy) Roccaraso	(United States) Greg Goody / Jodee Viola	(Italy) Alberto Borsarini / Claudia Rinaldi	(United States) Richard Green / Kyoko Harada
1990	(West Germany) Hanau	(United States) Greg Goody / Jodee Viola	(Italy) Alberto Borsarini / Claudia Rinaldi	(United States) Richard Green / Kyoko Harada
1991	(Australia) Sydney	(United States) Greg Goody / Jodee Viola	(Italy) Alberto Borsarini / Claudia Rinaldi	(United States) Doug Wait / Deanna Monahan
1992	(United States) Tampa	(United States) Doug Wait / Deanna Monahan	(United States) Timothy Patten / Lisa Friday	(Italy) Alberto Borsarini / Claudia Rinaldi
1993	(France) Bordeaux	(United States) Doug Wait / Deanna Monahan	(United States) Timothy Patten / Lisa Friday	(United States) Trey Knight / Kyoko Harada
1994	(Portugal) Funchal	(United States) Timothy Patten / Lisa Friday	(United States) Steven Siegmann / Tara Graney	(United States) Trey Knight / Kyoko Harada
1995	(Colombia) Bucaramanga	(United States) Trey Knight / Kyoko Harada	(United States) Timothy Patten / Hild	(Germany) Axel Haber / Swantje Gebauer
1996	(Argentina) Mar del Plata	(Germany) Axel Haber / Swantje Gebauer	(United States) Timothy Patten / Tara Graney	(United States) Jeffrey Clement / Harriet Graham
1997	(Spain) Reus	(Germany) Axel Haber / Swantje Gebauer	(United States) Timothy Patten / Tara Graney	(Italy) Fabio Grossi / Monica Brutti
1998	(Colombia) Bogotá	(United States) Ronald Brenn / Candi Powderly	(United States) Adam White / Melissa Quinn	(United States) Jeffrey Clement / Harriet Graham
1999	(Australia) Gold Coast	(United States) Timothy Patten / Tara Graney	(Italy) Marco Bornati / Emanuela Bornati	(Italy) Fabio Grossi / Monica Brutti
2000	(United States) Springfield	(United States) Adam White / Melissa Quinn	(Italy) Marco Bornati / Emanuela Bornati	(United States) Timothy Patten / Tara Anderson
2001	(Italy) Florence	(United States) Adam White / Melissa Quinn	(Italy) Marco Bornati / Emanuela Bornati	(Spain) Pedro Moreno / Soledad Martínez
2001	(Italy) Florence	(United States) Adam White / Melissa Quinn	(Italy) Marco Bornati / Emanuela Bornati	(Spain) Pedro Moreno / Soledad Martínez
2002	(Germany) Wuppertal	(Italy) Marco Bornati /Emanuela Bornati	(United States) Adam White / Melissa Quinn	(Spain) Pedro Moreno / Soledad Martínez
2004	(United States) Fresno	(Italy) Marco Bornati/Monika Coffele	(Italy) Gabriele Gaparini/Enrica Gasparini	(Italy) Mirko Pontello/Melissa De Candido
2005	(Italy) Rome	(Italy) Mirko Pontello/Melissa De Candido	(United States) Logan Boggs/Julie Locke	(Italy) Marco Bornati/Monika Coffele
2006	(Spain) Murcia	(Italy) Mirco Pontello/Melissa De Candido	(United States) Logan Boggs/Julie Locke	(United States) Kyle Turley/Heather Menard
2007	(Australia) Gold Coast	(Italy) Marco Bornati/Emanuela Bornati	(United States) Kyle Turley/Heather Menard	(Italy) Mirco Pontello/Melissa De Candido
2008	(Chinese Taipei) Kaohsiung	(Italy) Gabriele Gasparini/Enrica Gasparini	(Italy) Mirco Pontello/Melissa De Candido	(United States) Kyle Turley/Heather Menard
2009	(Germany) Freiburg	(Italy) Mirco Pontello/Melissa De Candido	(United States) Kyle Turley/Heather Menard-Turley	(Italy) Filippo Lodi Forni/Elena Leoni
2010	(Portugal) Portimão	(Italy) Mirco Pontello/Melissa De Candido	(United States) Kyle Turley/Heather Menard-Turley	(Italy) Filippo Lodi Forni/Elena Leoni
2011	(Brazil) Brasília	(Italy) Mirco Pontello/Melissa De Candido	(United States) Kyle Turley/Heather Menard-Turley	(Italy) Alessandro Spigai/Anna Remondini
2012	(New Zealand) Auckland	(Italy) Alessandro Spigai/Anna Remondini	(Italy) Filippo Lodi Forni/Elena Leoni	(Italy) Alberto Cazzoli/Cinzia Roana
2013	(Chinese Taipei) Taipei	(Italy) Alessandro Spigai/Anna Remondini	(Italy) Daniel Morandin/Melissa De Candido	(Italy) Andrea Bassi/Silvia Stibilj
2014	(Spain) Reus	(Italy) Daniel Morandin/Melissa De Candido	(Italy) Alessandro Spigai/Elena Leoni	(Italy) Andrea Bassi/Silvia Stibilj
2015	(Colombia) Cali	(Italy) Alessandro Spigai/Elena Leoni	(Italy) Andrea Bassi/Silvia Stibilj	(Portugal) Pedro Walgode/Ana Walgode
2016	(Italy) Novara	(Italy) Alessandro Spigai/Elena Leoni	(Italy) Andrea Bassi/Silvia Stibilj	(Italy) Alberto Maffei/Rachele Campagnol
2017	(China) Nanjing	(Italy) Danile Morandin/Anna Remondini	(Italy) Andrea Bassi/Silvia Stibilj	(Portugal) José Souto/Mariana Souto
2018	(France) La Roche-sur-Yon	(Italy) Daniel Morandin/Anna Remondini	(Italy) Andrea Bassi/Silvia Stibilj	(Portugal) José Cruz/Daniela Dias
2019	(Spain) Barcelona	(Italy) Daniel Morandin/Anna Remondini	(Portugal) Pedro Walgode/Ana Walgode	(Italy) Silvia Stibilj/Andrea Bassi
2021	(Paraguay) Asunción	(Italy) Giovanni Piccolantonio/Asya Sofia Testoni	(Portugal) Pedro Walgode/Ana Walgode	(Italy) Mattia Qualizza/Rachele Campagnol
2022	(Argentina) Buenos Aires	(Portugal) Pedro Walgode/Ana Walgode	(Italy) Giovanni Piccolantonio/Asya Sofia Testoni	(Italy) Raoul Allegranti/Caterina Artoni
2023	(Colombia) Ibagué	(Italy) Gherardo Altieri / Roberta Sasso	(Italy) Nicholas Masiero / Martina Nuti	(Italy) Raoul Alegranti / Caterina Artoni
2024	(Italy) Rimini	(Italy) Roberta Sasso / Gherardo Altieri	(Italy) Caterina Artoni / Raoul Allegranti	(Italy) Martina Nuti / Nicholas Masiero
2025	(China) Beijing	(Italy) Gherardo Altieri / Roberta Sasso	(Italy) Raoul Allegranti / Caterina Artoni	(Colombia) Jeshua Folleco / María Muñoz
2026	(Paraguay) Asunción	(Italy) Gherardo Altieri / Roberta Sasso	(Italy) Raoul Allegranti / Caterina Artoni	(Colombia) Jeshua Folleco / María Muñoz

=== Senior Men Inline ===
Year	Location	Gold	Silver	Bronze
2002	(Germany) Wuppertal	(Australia) Jayson Suttcliffe	(United States) Sean Arisco	(Chinese Taipei) Chien-Hao wang
2003	(Argentina) Buenos Aires	(Argentina) Walter Iglesias	(Australia) Jayson Suttcliffe	(Italy) Lorenzo Ronci
2004	(United States) Fresno	(Italy) Lorenzo Ronci	(Brazil) Gustavo Casado	(Argentina) Adrian Baturin
2005	(Italy) Rome	(Australia) Jayson Suttcliffe	(Argentina) Jordan Segovia	(Brazil) Gustavo Casado
2006	(Spain) Murcia	(Argentina) Carlos Urquía	(Brazil) Gustavo Casado	(France) Eric Traonouez
2007	(Australia) Gold Coast	(Brazil) Gustavo Casado	(Chinese Taipei) Hwang Chin-wei	(Argentina) Carlos Urquía
2008	(Chinese Taipei) Kaohsiung	(France) Eric Traonouez	(Argentina) Carlos Urquía	(Italy) Marco Viotto
2009	(Germany) Friburgo	(Brazil) Gustavo Casado	(France) Eric Traonouez	(Argentina) Carlos Urquía
2010	(Portugal) Portimão	(Chinese Taipei) Tsao Chih-i	(Argentina) Carlos Urquía	(Chinese Taipei) Lee Chun
2011	(Brazil) Brasília	(Argentina) Carlos Urquía	(Brazil) Diego Dores	(Chinese Taipei) Lee Chun
2012	(New Zealand) Auckland	(Chinese Taipei) Lee Chun	(India) Anup Kumar Yama	(Argentina) Carlos Urquía
2013	(Chinese Taipei) Taipei	(India) Anup Kumar Yama	(Argentina) Carlos Urquía	(Chinese Taipei) Lee Chun
2014	(Spain) Reus	(Chinese Taipei) Lee Chun	(Argentina) Carlos Urquía	(India) Anup Kumar Yama
2015	(Colombia) Cali	(Chinese Taipei) Yi-Fan chen	(Argentina) Carlos Urquía	(United States) Colin Motely
2016	(Italy) Novara	(Chinese Taipei) Yi-Fan chen	(Argentina) Carlos Urquía	(Italy) Antonio Panfili
2017	(China) Nanjing	(Chinese Taipei) Yi-Fan chen	(Italy) Antonio Panfili	(Chinese Taipei) Hung-Yu chien
2018	(France) La Roche-sur-Yon	(Chinese Taipei) Yi-Fan chen	(Italy) Antonio Panfili	(Chinese Taipei) Hung-Yu chien
2019	(Spain) Barcelona	(Chinese Taipei) Yi-Fan chen	(Chinese Taipei) Hung-Yu chien	(Italy) Antonio Panfili
2021	(Paraguay) Asunción	(United States) Collin Motley	(Chinese Taipei) Yi-Fan chen	(Italy) Antonio Panfili
2022	(Argentina) Buenos Aires	(Chinese Taipei) Yi-Fan chen	(Italy) Antonio Panfili	(Chinese Taipei) Bo-yu chen
2023	(Colombia) Ibagué	(United States) Collin Motley	(Italy) Antonio Panfili	(Chinese Taipei) Chen Bo-yu
2024	(Italy) Rimini	(United States) Collin Motley	(Chinese Taipei) Chen Yi-fan	(Spain) David Gutiérrez
2025	(China) Beijing	(Italy) Elvis Martinello	(Spain) David Gutiérrez	(Chinese Taipei) Chen Yi-fan
2026	(Paraguay) Asunción	(Chinese Taipei) Chen Yi-fan	(Italy) Elvis Martinello	(Russia) Egor Tomilin

=== Senior Women Inline ===
Year	Location	Gold	Silver	Bronze
2002	(Germany) Wuppertal	(Italy) Silvia Marangoni	(United States) Aubrey Orcutt	(Italy) Anna Iannucci
2003	(Argentina) Buenos Aires	(Australia) Tammy Bryant	(Italy) Silvia Marangoni	(Argentina) Daniela Rodas
2004	(United States) Fresno	(Italy) Silvia Marangoni	(Australia) Kristen Slade	(New Zealand) Sarah-Jane Jones
2005	(Italy) Rome	(Australia) Tammy Bryant	(Italy) Silvia Marangoni	(Australia) Kristen Slade
2006	(Spain) Murcia	(Italy) Silvia Marangoni	(Australia) Kristen Slade	(New Zealand) Sarah-Jane Jones
2007	(Australia) Gold Coast	(Italy) Silvia Marangoni	(Australia) Kristen Slade	(United States) Courtney Donovan
2008	(Taiwan) Kaohsiung	(Italy) Silvia Marangoni	(United States) Natalie Motley	(Chinese Taipei) Hsin Chia-ling
2009	(Germany) Friburgo	(Italy) Silvia Marangoni	(United States) Natalie Motley	(Chinese Taipei) Hsin Chia-ling
2010	(Portugal) Portimão	(Italy) Silvia Marangoni	(United States) Natalie Motley	(New Zealand) Kristen Slade
2011	(Brazil) Brasília	(Italy) Silvia Marangoni	(United States) Natalie Motley	(United States) Courtney Donovan
2012	(New Zealand) Auckland	(Italy) Silvia Marangoni	(United States) Natalie Motley	(New Zealand) Kristen Slade
2013	(Chinese Taipei) Taipei	(Italy) Silvia Marangoni	(Chinese Taipei) Hsin Chin-ling	(United States) Natalie Motley
2014	(Spain) Reus	(United States) Natalie Motley	(Italy) Silvia Marangoni	(Chinese Taipei) Hsin Chin-ling
2015	(Colombia) Cali	(Italy) Silvia Marangoni	(Argentina) Lucia Kindebaluc	(Argentina) Valentina Escobar
2016	(Italy) Novara	(United States) Natalie Motley	(Germany) Claudia Pfeifer	(France) Serena Giraud
2017	(China) Nanjing	(Germany) Claudia Pfeifer	(France) Serena Giraud	(Italy) Metka Kuk
2018	(France) La Roche-sur-Yon	(United States) Natalie Motley	(Russia) Anastasia Nosova	(France) Serena Giraud
2019	(Spain) Barcelona	(Italy) Chiara Censori	(Russia) Anastasia Nosova	(Italy) Metka Kuk
2021	(Paraguay) Asunción	(France) Serena Giraud	(Italy) Metka Kuk	(Italy) Chiara Censori
2022	(Argentina) Buenos Aires	(Italy) Sofia Paronetto	(Argentina) Leila Aciar	(Brazil) Maysa Todeschi
2023	(Colombia) Ibagué	(Italy) Sofia Paronetto	(Argentina) Leila Aciar	(Brazil) Maysa Todeschi
2024	(Italy) Rimini	(Spain) Paula Romaguera	(Italy) Sofia Ciacia	(Italy) Alessia Bilancioni
2025	(China) Beijing	(Spain) Paula Romaguera	(Italy) Clara Barattoni	(Italy) Sofia Ciacia
2026	(Paraguay) Asunción	(Italy) Sofia Ciacia	(Italy) Clara Barattoni	(Argentina) Giuliana Scamarda

=== Precision Team ===
Year	Location	Gold	Silver	Bronze
1999	(Australia) Gold Coast	(Germany) Dream Team	(Germany) Formation of Hanau	(Germany) Skate Attack
2000	(United States) Springfield	(Germany) Dream Team	(Germany) Skate Attack	(Denmark) Team X-Treme
2001	(Italy) Florence	(Germany) Dream Team	(Germany) Skate Attack	(Germany) Team Supreme
2002	(Germany) Wuppertal	(Germany) Dream Team	(Germany) Skate Attack	(Denmark) Team X-Treme
2003	(Argentina) Buenos Aires	(Argentina) Millennium	(Germany) Skate Attack	(Argentina) Grupo Buenos Aires
2004	(United States) Fresno	(Germany) Skate Attack	(Germany) Dream Team	(Argentina) Tradequip
2005	(Italy) Rome	(Germany) Skate Attack	(Germany) Dream Team	(Italy) Sincro Roller Bologna
2006	(Spain) Murcia	(Argentina) Tradequip	(Argentina) Millennium	(Germany) Skate Attack
2007	(Australia) Gold Coast	(Argentina) La Plata	(Germany) Skate Attack	(Argentina) Tradequip
2008	(Chinese Taipei) Kaohsiung	(Argentina) Millennium		
2009	(Germany) Freiburg	(Germany) Dream Team	(Italy) Albinea - Mach 3	(Italy) Sincro Roller
2010	(Portugal) Portimão	(Argentina) Millennium	(Italy) Infinity	(Germany) Dream Team
2011	(Brazil) Brasília	(Argentina) Millennium	(Argentina) Precision Skate	(Italy) Precision Team Albinea
2012	(New Zealand) Auckland	(Argentina) Millennium	(Argentina) Roller Dreams	(Italy) Sincro Roller
2013	(Chinese Taipei) Taipei	(Argentina) Millennium	(Italy) Sincro Roller	(Argentina) Precision Skate
2014	(Spain) Reus	(Argentina) Roller Dreams	(Argentina) Millennium	(Italy) Sincro Roller
2015	(Colombia) Cali	(Argentina) Millennium	(Argentina) Roller Dreams	(Italy) Sincro Roller
2016	(Italy) Novara	(Italy) Sincro Roller	(Argentina) Roller Dreams	(Argentina) Precision Skates
2017	(China) Nanjing	(Argentina) Millennium	(Italy) Precision Team Albinea	(Italy) Sincro Roller
2018	(France) La Roche-sur-Yon	(Argentina) Millennium	(Argentina) Roller Dreams - Grease	(Italy) Sincro Roller Calderara - Skeletons
2019	(Spain) Barcelona	(Germany) Dream Team - Battle Cry	(Argentina) Roller Dream - Diosas de la India	(Italy) Precision Team Albinea - Irish Tales
2021	(Paraguay) Asunción	(Argentina) Roller Dreams	(Italy) Sincrolimpic	(Italy) Sincro Roller
2022	(Argentina) Buenos Aires	(Argentina) Roller Dreams	(Italy) Precision Skate Bologna	(Italy) Sincro Roller
2023	(Colombia) Ibagué	(Argentina) Roller Dreams	(Italy) Precision Skate Bologna	(Italy) Sincro Roller
2024	(Italy) Rimini	(Italy) Precision Skate Bologna	(Germany) Dream Team	(Argentina) Roller Dreams
2025	(China) Beijing	(Italy) Monza Precision Team	(Italy) Sincro Roller	(Italy) Precision Skate Bologna
2026	(Paraguay) Asunción	(Italy) Sincro Roller	(Italy) Monza Precision Team	(Argentina) Roller Dreams

=== Large Show Team ===
Year	Location	Gold	Silver	Bronze
2002	(Germany) Wuppertal	(Italy) Color of the World	This is Brazil	(United States) Blast from the past
2003	(Argentina) Buenos Aires	(Italy) In Memoriam	(Argentina) Surprise	(Spain) CPA OLOT - Roots
2004	(United States) Fresno	(Spain) CPA OLOT - Freedom	(Italy) A Game of Notes	(Italy) It happened in Sarajevo
2005	(Italy) Rome	(Spain) CPA OLOT - Animal Instinct	(Argentina) La Historia	(Italy) Cristal Skating
2006	(Spain) Murcia	(Spain) CPA Olot	(Argentina) Shwart	(Spain) Patinage El Masnou
2007	(Australia) Gold Coast	(Spain) CPA OLOT - Very Fragile	(Italy) Rebellion	(Argentina) Carmen
2008	(Chinese Taipei) Kaohsiung	(Italy) Jokers		
2009	(Germany) Freiburg	(Spain) CPA OLOT - Seduction	(Spain) Atómico	(Italy) Vanity:Narcisius and the Lake
2010	(Portugal) Portimão	(Spain) Open Step	(Italy) Travelling Towards Immortality	(Italy) Galileo Goes To Hell
2011	(Brazil) Brasília	(Italy) Emilio Salgari 1862–1911	(Spain) Superstition	
2012	(New Zealand) Auckland	(Spain) Reus Deportiu	(Spain) CPA Olot	(Italy) Royal Eagles
2013	(Chinese Taipei) Taipei	(Spain) CPA Olot	(Italy) Cristal Skating	(Argentina) Master Show
2014	(Spain) Reus	(Spain) CPA Olot - Breathe	(Spain) Patinatge El Masnou - Labyrinth	(Spain) Cristal Skating - Gran Casino
2015	(Colombia) Cali	(Spain) CPA Olot - Survive	(Italy) Royal Eagle - The Arabian nights: 1001 nights	(Spain) CPA Girona - Doing and undoing
2016	(Italy) Novara	(Spain) CPA Olot - Get met out of here	(Spain) CPA Girona - Midnight	(Italy) Diamante - Mother board
2017	(China) Nanjing	(Spain) CPA Olot - I'm Innocent	(Spain) CEPA Girona - Slaves of Wealth	(Italy) Diamante - The Producer
2018	(France) La Roche-sur-Yon	(Spain) CPA Olot - Without Options	(Spain) CEPA Girona - Here I am	(Italy) Royal Eagles - Un Oceano di Ricordi
2019	(Spain) Barcelona	(Spain) CEPA Girona - Bacterium	(Spain) CPA Olot - Don't clip my wings	(Italy) Diamante - Through the eyes of a child
2021	(Paraguay) Asunción	(Spain) CPA Olot	(Italy) Cristal Skating	(Italy) Show Roller Team
2022	(Argentina) Buenos Aires	(Argentina) Millennium	(Spain) CPA Olot	(Spain) CEPA Girona
2023	(Colombia) Ibagué	(Spain) CPA Olot	(Spain) CPA Girona	(Spain) CPA Tona
2024	(Italy) Rimini	(Spain) CPA Olot	(Italy) Cristal Skating	(Spain) CPA Girona
2025	(China) Beijing	(Spain) CPA Olot	(Spain) CPA Girona	(Italy) Cristal Skating
2026	(Paraguay) Asunción	(Spain) CPA Olot	(Italy) Royal Eagles	(Spain) CPA Tona

=== Small Show Team ===
Year	Location	Gold	Silver	Bronze
2007	(Australia) Gold Coast	(Spain) Chemistry	(Brazil) Chicago	(Argentina) West Side Story
2008	(Chinese Taipei) Kaohsiung	(Italy) Odi et Amo		
2009	(Germany) Freiburg	(Italy) The Cossack Army	(Argentina) Carlos Gardel	(Italy) The Choice
2010	(Portugal) Portimão	(Italy) Zodiac	(Italy) Migration	(Spain) Today I'll Fly
2011	(Brazil) Brasília	(Italy) Let's Swing	(Argentina) Fire Inside	(Argentina) Who?
2012	(New Zealand) Auckland	(Italy) Evolution	(Italy) Division	(Brazil) Wheels On Fire
2013	(Chinese Taipei) Taipei	(Italy) Division	(Argentina) Iazury	(Spain) Blanes
2014	(Spain) Reus	(Italy) Division - El lento conquistador	(Spain) L'Aldea CP - II	(Spain) Blanes Fundacio - As time goes by
2015	(Colombia) Cali	(Italy) Division - Sevilla 1820	(Italy) Roma Roller Team - The Academy awards	(Brazil) CRSG - The Arabian nights
2016	(Italy) Novara	(Italy) New Age - The Light Inside	(Italy) Division - Cruiser to Naples	(Brazil) CRSG - Topsy Turvy
2017	(China) Nanjing	(Italy) Division - Love for a Stranger	(Spain) Patinatge Artistic Macanet - Try Again?	(Italy) New Age - Seasons of Life
2018	(France) La Roche-sur-Yon	(Italy) Roma Roller Team - Leonardo da Vinci	(Italy) Division - Io ho vinto	(Spain) CP L'Aldea - Tame me
2019	(Spain) Barcelona	(Spain) CP L'Aldea - Without the Sun	(Spain) CPA Gondomar - Saint Mary	(Italy) Roma Roller Team - The medicine evolution
2021	(Paraguay) Asunción	(Italy) Roma Roller Team	(Spain) CP Matadepera	(Brazil) CRSG
2022	(Argentina) Buenos Aires	(Spain) CPA Tona	(Italy) Déjà Vu	(Spain) CPA Gondomar
2023	(Colombia) Ibagué	(Spain) CPA Tona	(Spain) Artistic Skating Cunit	(Italy) Roma Roller Dream
2024	(Italy) Rimini	(Spain) Artistic Skating Cunit	(Italy) Déjà Vu	(Spain) CPA Tona
2025	(China) Beijing	(Spain) Artístic Skating Cunit	(Spain) CPA Tona	(Italy) Déjà Vu
2026	(Paraguay) Asunción	(Spain) Artístic Skating Cunit	(Spain) CPA Tona	(Italy) Evolution

=== Quartets ===
Year	Location	Gold	Silver	Bronze
2015	(Colombia) Cali	(Italy) Celebrity - B. Crazy	(Italy) Neovis - Now or never	(Spain) Reus Deportiu - Black leather
2016	(Italy) Novara	(Italy) Celebrity - Notturno	(Portugal) RM - Seven nations army	(Spain) CP Pareits - María
2017	(China) Nanjing	(Portugal) The Project - Are you Mambo?	(Italy) Celebrity - Dance With Me	(Italy) Neovis - The other part of me
2018	(France) La Roche-sur-Yon	(Italy) Neovis - The beginning of the end	(Portugal) The Project - Boys are Back	(Italy) Celebrity - Song of the World
2019	(Spain) Barcelona	(Italy) Celebrity - Piano Concerto No. 3	(Italy) Neovis - Pink or blue	(Portugal) Say Yes - Your majesty
2021	(Paraguay) Asunción	(Italy) Celebrity	(Italy) Neovis	(Spain) Artistic Skating Cunit
2022	(Argentina) Buenos Aires	(Italy) Celebrity	(Spain) Vortex	(Italy) Deja Vu
2023	(Colombia) Ibagué	(Spain) Vortex	(Italy) Celebrity	(Spain) Clover
2024	(Italy) Rimini	(Spain) Vortex	(Portugal) Rolar4Sk8	(Italy) Celebrity
2025	(China) Beijing	(Spain) Vortex	(Portugal) Rolar4Sk8	(Colombia) Vento
2026	(Paraguay) Asunción	(Spain) Vortex	(Colombia) Vento	(Italy) Neovis

== See also ==
- World Skate
