= San Vito al Tagliamento =

San Vito al Tagliamento San Vît dal Tiliment (Friulian)
- Comune
- Comune di San Vito al Tagliamento
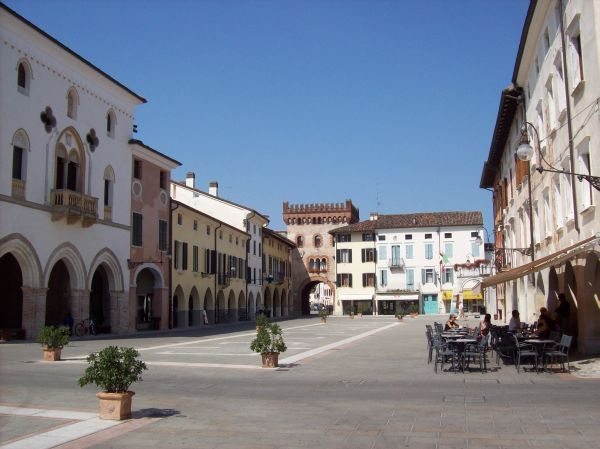
- Piazza del Pololo

- Coat of arms

- Location within Italy Location within Friuli-Venezia Giulia
- Coordinates: 45°54′N 12°52′E
- Country: Italy
- Region: Friuli-Venezia Giulia
- Province: Pordenone (PN)
- Frazioni: Carbona, Gleris, Ligugnana, Madonna di Rosa, Prodolone, Rosa, Savorgnano

Government
  - Mayor: Alberto Bernava (civic list)

Area
  - Total: 60.88 km^{2} (23.51 sq mi)
- Elevation: 30 m (98 ft)

Population (2015)
  - Total: 15 106
  - Density: 0.25/km^{2} (0.64/sq mi)
- Demonym: Sanvitesi
- Time zone: UTC+1 (CET)
  - Summer (DST): UTC+2 (CEST)
- Postal code: 33078
- Dialing code: 0434
- Patron saint: Saint Vito
- Saint day: June 15
- Website: Official website

San Vito al Tagliamento (Friulian: San Vît dal Tiliment) is a comune (municipality) in the Regional decentralization entity of Pordenone, in the Italian region of Friuli-Venezia Giulia, located about 80 kilometres (50 mi) northwest of Trieste and about 20 kilometres (12 mi) southeast of Pordenone.

== Main sights ==
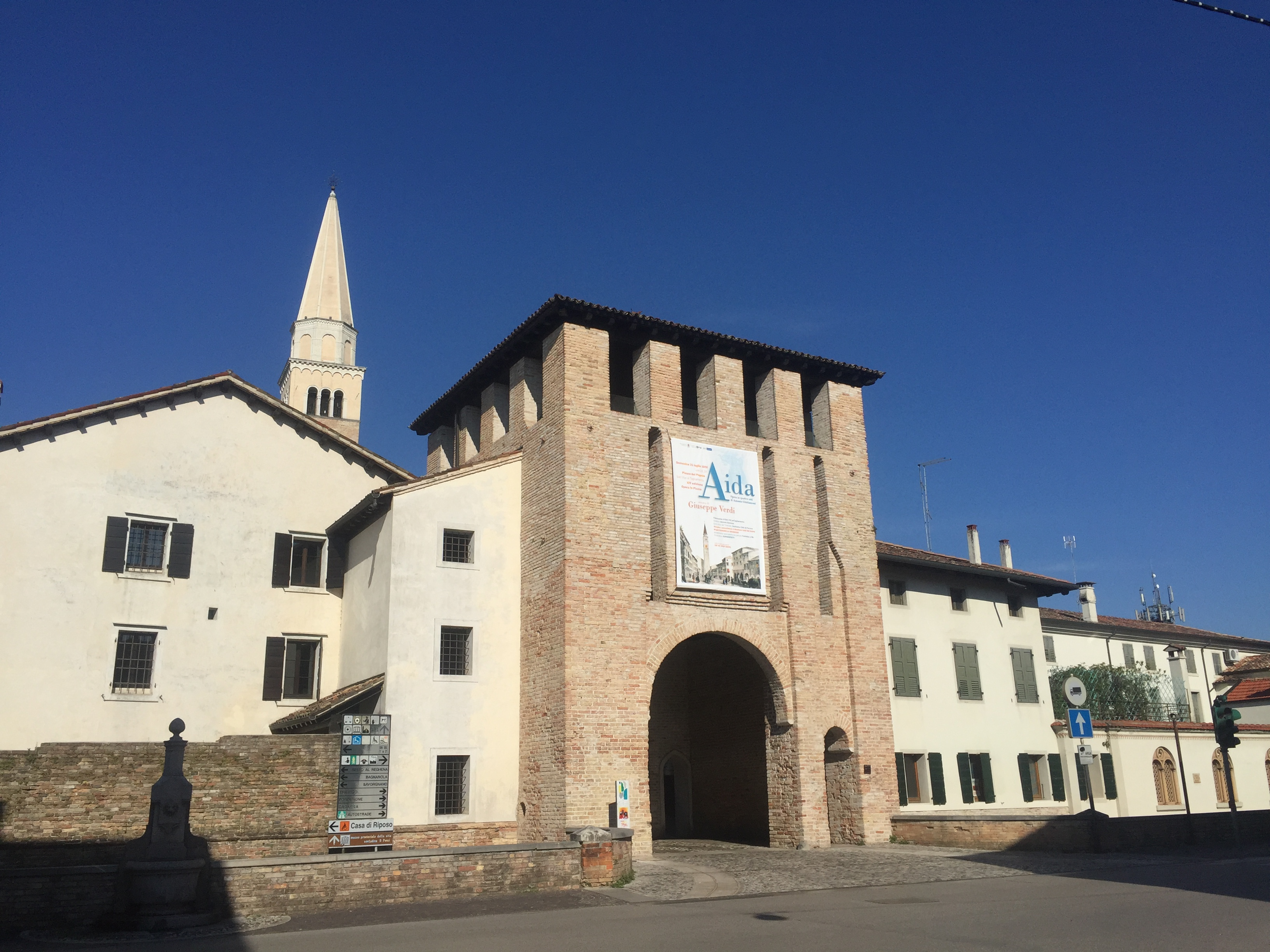
Eastern tower (13th century)

It is a medieval town on the right bank of the Tagliamento river.

The main attractions are:

- Three towers of the old medieval walls, one of which houses a small archaeological museum
- Church of San Lorenzo (1479)
- Church of Santa Maria dei Battuti, housing works by Pomponio Amalteo and Giovanni Antonio Pilacorte.
- Palazzo Rota, now the Town Hall
- The Duomo, with a triptych by Andrea Bellunello and works by Amalteo, Gaspare Diziani and Padovanino

== International relations ==
=== Twin towns — sister cities ===
San Vito al Tagliamento is twinned with:

- Rixheim, France
- Stadtlohn, Germany
- Nagyatád, Hungary
- Sankt Veit an der Glan, Austria

== People ==
- Antonio Altan (end of 14th century – 1450), bishop and papal envoy
- Pomponio Amalteo (1505–1588), painter
- Paolo Sarpi (1552–1623), religious, theologian, historian and scientist hailing from San Vito
- Anton Lazzaro Moro (1687–1764), religious and naturalist
- Pietro Angelo Cristofoli (1841–1920), soldier in Garibaldi's army
- Zefferino Tomè (1905–1979), politician, Senator of the Republic and former city mayor
- Claudio Fogolin (1872–1945), cofounder Lancia company
- Federico Morassutti (1876–1954), entrepreneur and philanthropist, a prominent member of the Morassutti family
- Arnaldo Mussolini (1885–1931), reporter and politician, Benito Mussolini's brother. He was a teacher in San Vito.
- Riccardo Cassin (1909–2009), mountaineer
- Vito Mussolini (1912–1963), reporter and Italian politician, Benito Mussolini's nephew
- Carlo Tullio Altan (1916–2005), anthropologist, sociologist and philosopher
- Anna Maria Frisacco (1916–2012), tennis player
- Franco Castellano (1957), actor
- Andrea Cessel (1969), basketball player
- Filippo Cristante (1977), football player
- Bryan Cristante (1995), football player
- Massimo Donati (1981), football player
- Melissa Comin De Candido (1983), figure roller skater
- Giuseppe Enrico Gastaldis (unknown – unknown), agronomist
- Carlo Pegorer (1955), politician, Senathor of the Republic since 2006
- Alberto Fasulo (1976), film director, Marc'Aurelio d'oro winner at Festival del cinema di Roma 2013 edition
- Alessandro Comodin (1982), film director, screenwriter, photographer, film editor

== Trivia ==
- Benito Mussolini's brother taught in San Vito al Tagliamento for several years. First at Gleris and later at Falcon-Vial's institute.
- In San Vito al Tagliamento, it is possible to find the miraculous painting about "Madonna di Rosa" crowned by Pope Leo XIII "Queen and protectress of Tagliamento and his inhabitants".
- In the yard in front of Ligugnana's church there is the sculpture of Saint Lawrence, sculpted by Pierino Sam (1921–2010).

== Gallery ==
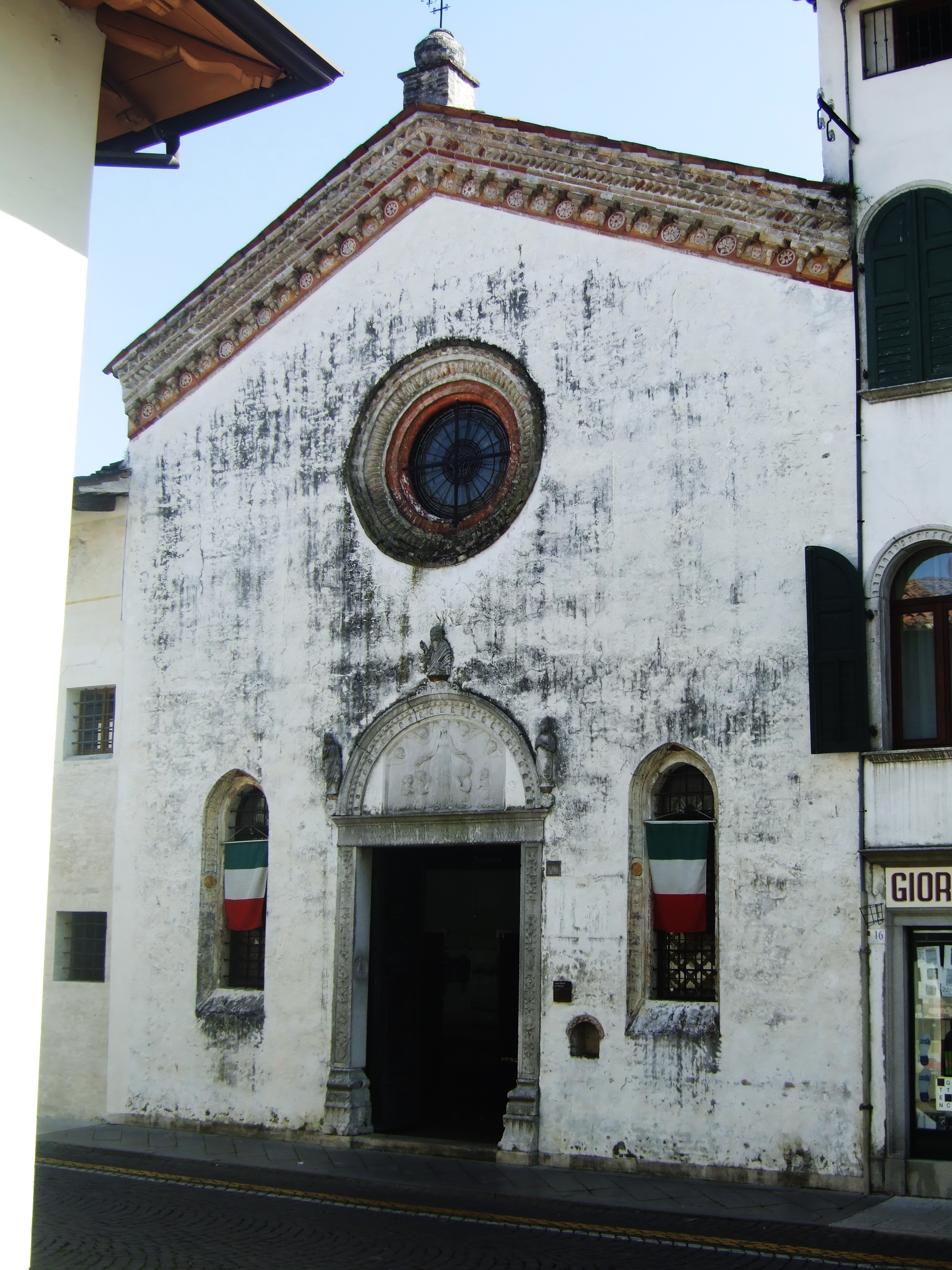
Church of Santa Maria dei Battuti

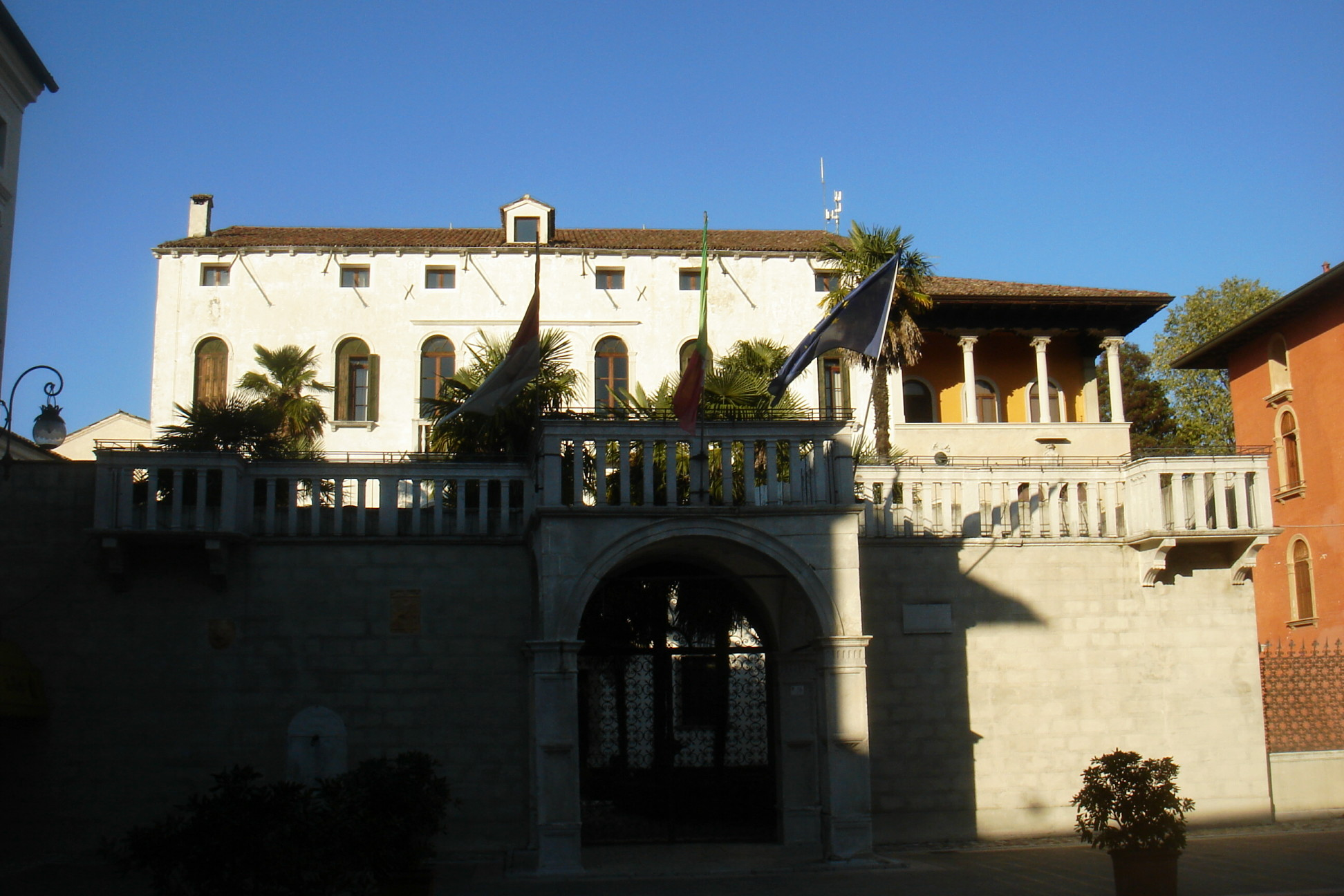
Palazzo Rota palace (town hall) in Piazza del Popolo

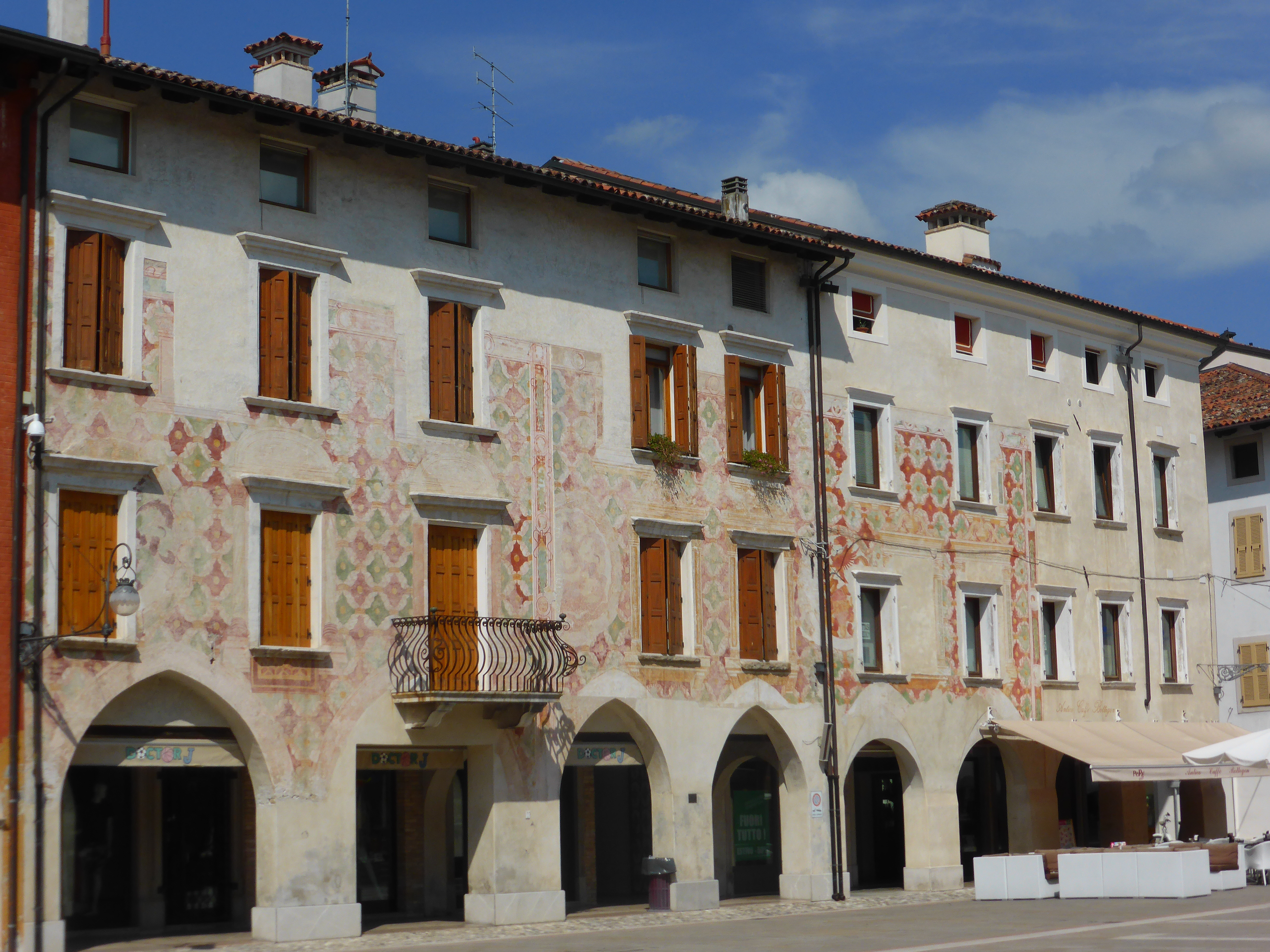
Frescoed palaces on the north-east side of Piazza del Popolo

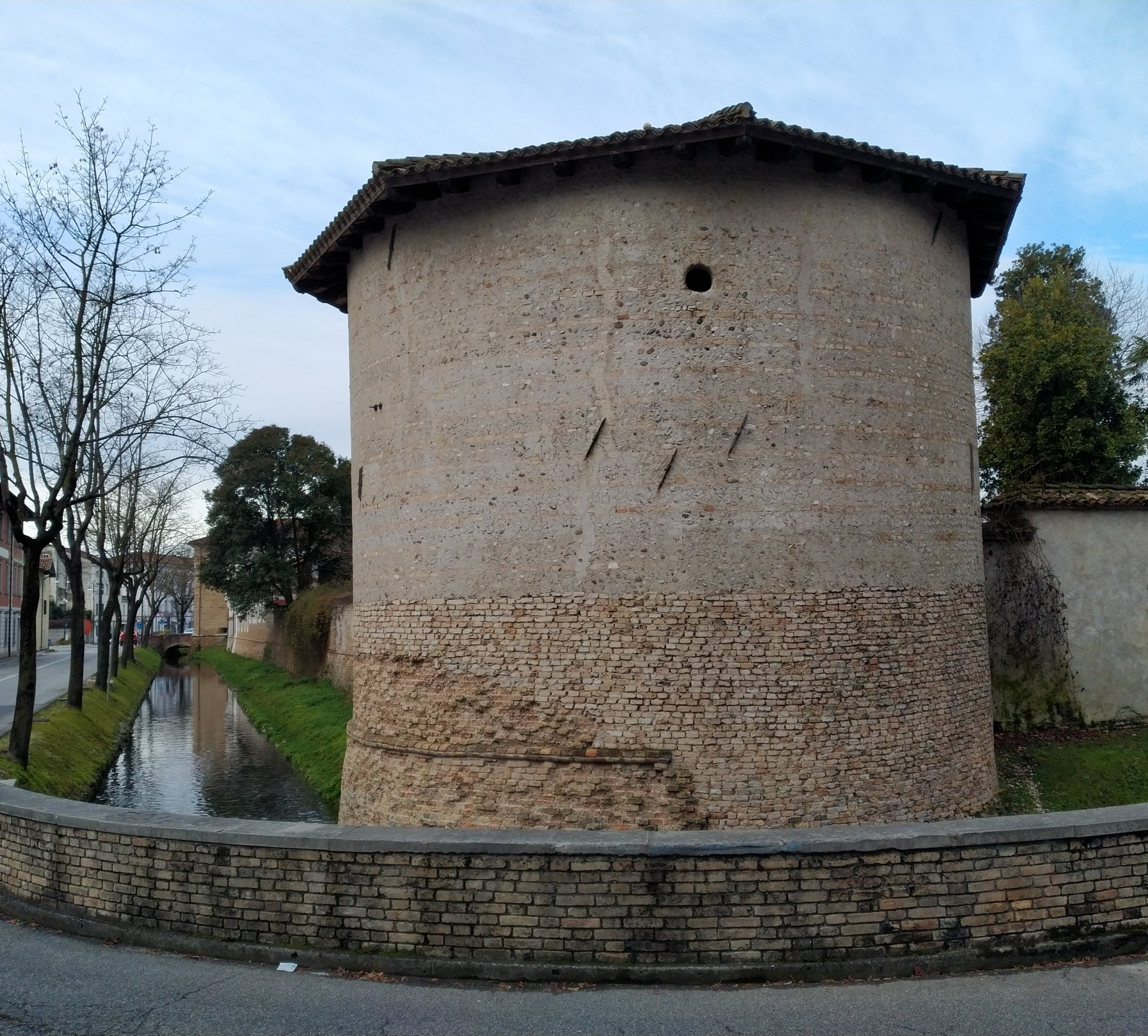
Tower at the south-east corner of the walls (16th century)

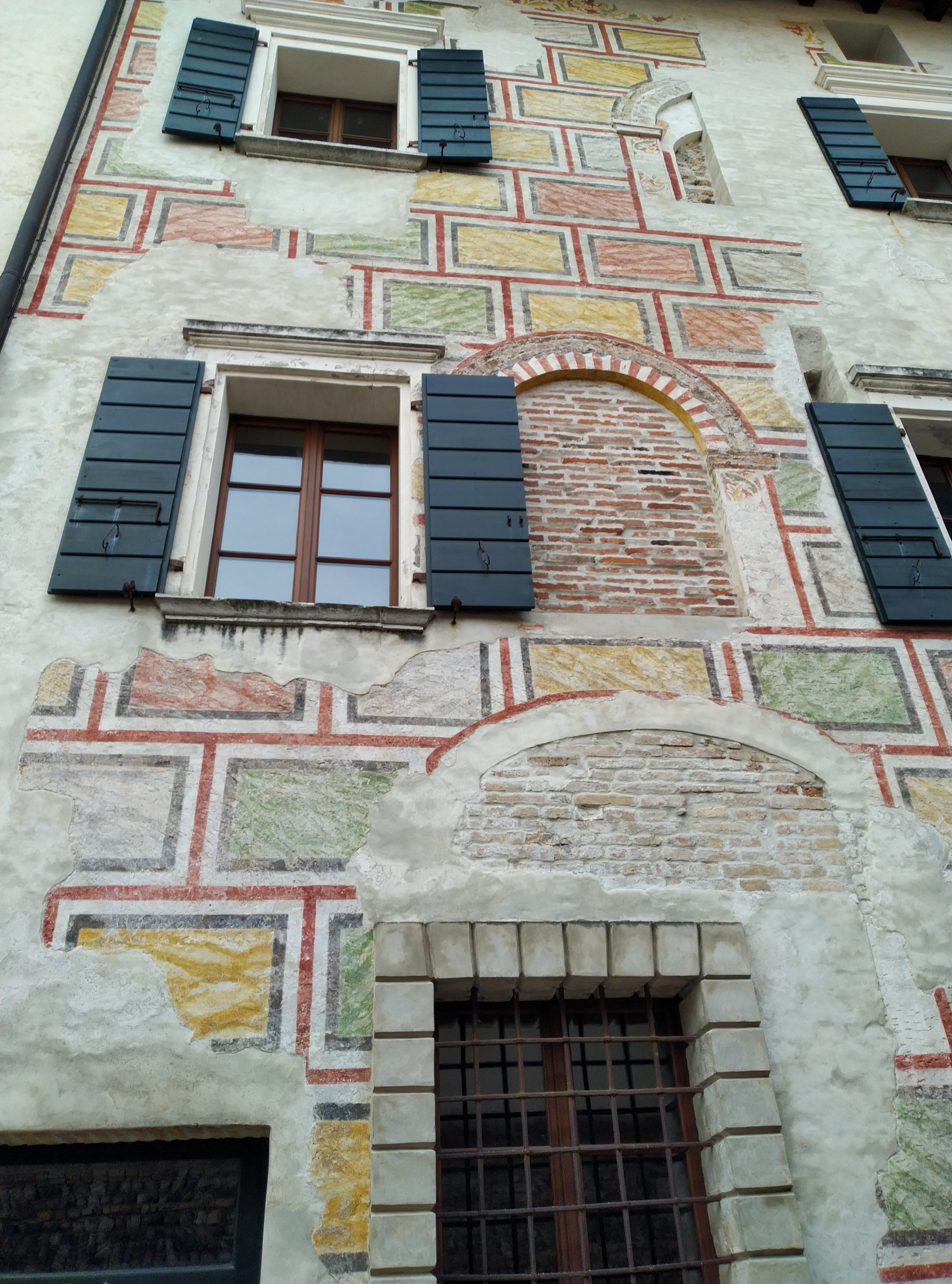
Palace of the old castle – detail of the frescoes on the north-west wall

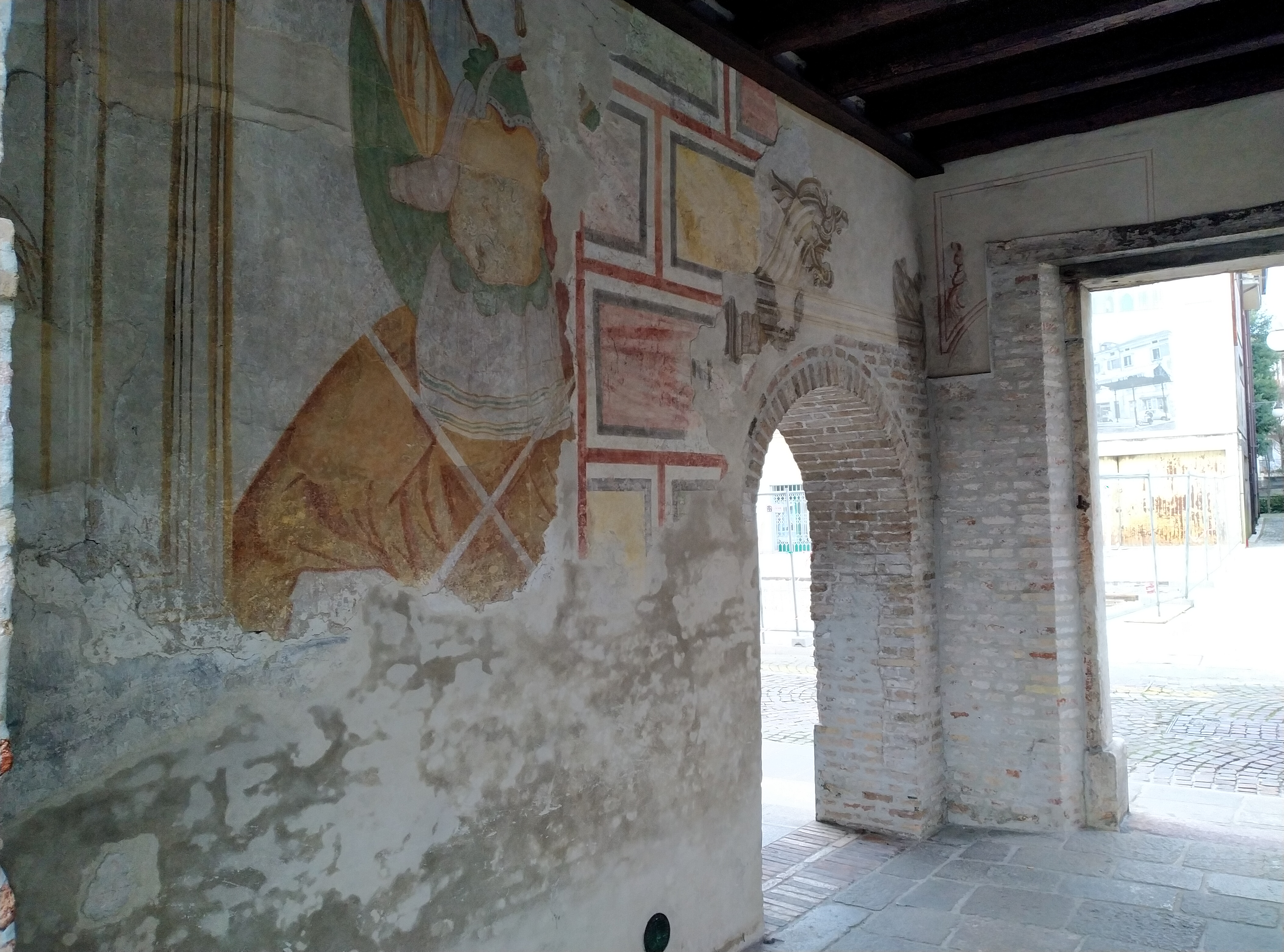
Frescoed gallery in the northwest corner of the old castle's palace
