= Roller sports at the 2009 World Games =

At the 2009 World Games in Kaohsiung, three different roller sports disciplines were contested: artistic roller skating, inline speed skating and inline hockey. The speed events were held July 17–19 at Yangming Skating Rink. The artistic events took place July 21–22 and the inline hockey competition occurred July 23–26, both at the I-Shou University Gymnasium.

== Artistic roller skating ==
Event	Gold	Silver	Bronze
Men freeskating	Carles Gasset (ESP)	Roberto Riva (ITA)	Marcel Sturmer (BRA)
Women freeskating	Tanja Romano (ITA)	Nika Arcon (SLO)	Monika Lis (GER)
Pairs	Italy; Sara Venerucci; Matteo Guarise	United States; Aubrey Orcutt; Robert Hines	Germany; Christiane Reich; Hannes Muschol
Dance	Italy; Enrica Gasparini; Gabriele Gasparini	Spain; Ayelen Morales; Oscar Molins	United States; Erin Ovens; Jonathan Cross

== Inline speed skating ==
=== Men ===
Event	Gold	Silver	Bronze
300 m time trial	Lo Wei-lin (TPE)	Andres Felipe Munoz (COL)	Pedro Armando Causil (COL)
500 m	Andres Felipe Munoz (COL)	Lo Wei-lin (TPE)	Lee Myung Kyu (KOR)
1000 m	Pedro Armando Causil (COL)	Alexis Contin (FRA)	Claudio Naselli (ITA)
10000 m points race	Yann Guyader (FRA)	Nelson Garzon (COL)	Daniel Alvarez (VEN)
15000 m	Jorge Luis Cifuentes (COL)	Yann Guyader (FRA)	Andres Felipe Munoz (COL)

=== Women ===
Event	Gold	Silver	Bronze
300 m time trial	Huang Yu-ting (TPE)	Hsu Chiao-jen (TPE)	Lim Jin Seon (KOR)
500 m	Huang Yu-ting (TPE)	Lim Jin Seon (KOR)	Yersi Puello (COL)
1000 m	Huang Yu-ting (TPE)	Hsu Chiao-jen (TPE)	Nicole Begg (NZL)
10000 m points race	Woo Hyo Sook (KOR)	Martha Lucia Ramírez (COL)	Nicole Begg (NZL)
15000 m	Woo Hyo Sook (KOR)	Martha Lucia Ramírez (COL)	Pan Yi-chin (TPE)

== Inline hockey ==
=== Men ===
Rank	Team	Pld	W	D	L	GF	GA	Pts	(United States)	(France)	(Czech Republic)	(Switzerland)	(Italy)	(Chinese Taipei)
1st place, gold medalist(s)	United States	5	5	0	0	25	9	10		5:1	2:1	6:5	5:2	7:0
2nd place, silver medalist(s)	France	5	3	1	1	19	10	7	1:5		4:1	3:1	3:3	8:0
3rd place, bronze medalist(s)	Czech Republic	5	3	0	2	18	10	6	1:2	1:4		5:2	3:1	8:1
4	Switzerland	5	2	0	3	23	16	4	5:6	1:3	2:5		6:1	9:1
5	Italy	5	1	1	3	11	17	3	2:5	3:3	1:3	1:6		4:0
6	Chinese Taipei	5	0	0	5	2	36	0	0:7	0:8	1:8	1:9	0:4	
