= Roberto Riva =

Personal information
- Nationality: Italian
- Born: 23 October 1986 (age 39) Monza, Italy

Sport
- Country: Italy
- Sport: Artistic roller skating
Medal record
Men's artistic roller skating
Representing Italy
World Championships
Gold medal – first place	2005 Rome	Combined event
Gold medal – first place	2005 Rome	Freeskating
Gold medal – first place	2006 Murcia	Combined event
Gold medal – first place	2006 Murcia	Figures
Gold medal – first place	2007 Gold Coast	Combined event
Gold medal – first place	2007 Gold Coast	Figures
Gold medal – first place	2007 Gold Coast	Freeskating
Gold medal – first place	2008 Kaohsiung	Combined event
Gold medal – first place	2008 Kaohsiung	Figures
Gold medal – first place	2008 Kaohsiung	Freeskating
Silver medal – second place	2006 Murcia	Freeskating
World Games
Silver medal – second place	2009 Kaohsiung	Freeskating

Roberto Riva (born 23 October 1986 in Monza) is an Italian artistic roller skater, 10 times world champion at the Artistic Skating World Championship.

== Biography ==
Riva won the silver medal, in freeskating, at the 2009 World Games held in Kaohsiung.

== Achievements ==
Year	Competition	Venue	Position	Event	Notes
2005	Artistic Skating World Championship	(Italy) Rome	1st	Combined event	
2005	Artistic Skating World Championship	(Italy) Rome	1st	Freeskating	
2006	Artistic Skating World Championship	(Spain) Murcia	1st	Combined event	
2006	Artistic Skating World Championship	(Spain) Murcia	1st	Figures	
2006	Artistic Skating World Championship	(Spain) Murcia	2nd	Freeskating	
2007	Artistic Skating World Championship	(Australia) Gold Coast	1st	Combined event	
2007	Artistic Skating World Championship	(Australia) Gold Coast	1st	Figures	
2007	Artistic Skating World Championship	(Australia) Gold Coast	1st	Freeskating	
2008	Artistic Skating World Championship	(Chinese Taipei) Kaohsiung	1st	Combined event	
2008	Artistic Skating World Championship	(Chinese Taipei) Kaohsiung	1st	Figures	
2008	Artistic Skating World Championship	(Chinese Taipei) Kaohsiung	1st	Freeskating	
2009	World Games	(Chinese Taipei) Kaohsiung	2nd	Freeskating	

== See also ==
- Most successful athlete in each sport at the World Championships
