= 2003 Artistic World Skating Championships =

The 2003 Artistic World Skating Championships was the second Artistic Skating World Championship. The event was held in the Luna Park Stadium, in Buenos Aires, Argentina.

The championship was held between 8 and 23 November 2003.

== Results ==
=== Senior Men's Freestyle ===
| Gold | Silver | Bronze |
|---|---|---|
| (Italy) Luca D'Alisera | (Italy) Andrea Barbieri | (Argentina) Daniel Arriola |

=== Senior Ladies Freestyle ===
| Gold | Silver | Bronze |
|---|---|---|
| (Italy) Tanja Romano | (United States) Heather Mulkey | (Italy) Sonia Traversa |

=== Senior Pairs ===
| Gold | Silver | Bronze |
|---|---|---|
| (Italy) Federico Degli Esposti/Marika Zanforlin | (Italy) Giovanni Dallarda/Gaia Grandi | (Italy) Enrico Fabbri/Michela Ermetii |

=== Senior Dance ===
| Gold | Silver | Bronze |
|---|---|---|
| (Italy) Fabio Grossi/Michela Pizzi | (United States) Adam White/Melissa Quinn | (Italy) Marco Bornati/Emanuela Bornati |

=== Senior Men Inline ===
| Gold | Silver | Bronze |
|---|---|---|
| (Argentina) Walter Iglesias | (Australia) Jayson Suttcliffe | (Italy) Lorenzo Ronci |

=== Senior Women Inline ===
| Gold | Silver | Bronze |
|---|---|---|
| (Australia) Tammy Bryant | (Italy) Silvia Marangoni | (Argentina) Daniela Rodas |
