= Jack Courtney (figure skater) =

American pair skater (born 1953)

Jack Courtney (born February 10, 1953) is a former American pair skater. He competed with partners Sheryl Trueman, Cozette Cady, and Emily Benenson. Courtney was a world champion in artistic roller skating in 1969, both in men's singles and in pairs with Trueman. They switched to ice skating in July 1970 and competed for the first time in the 1970-71 season at the junior pairs level, finishing 8th in that division at the 1971 U.S. Championships.

In the 1971-72 season, Courtney teamed with Cozette Cady and moved up to the senior level. They placed 4th at the 1972 U.S. Championships.

== Competitive highlights ==
(with Benenson)

Event	1975	1976	1977
U.S. Championships	3rd	3rd	

(with Cozette Cady)

Event	1971-72	1972-73
U.S. Championships	4th	5th
Nebelhorn Trophy		1st
