= Anastasia Nosova =

Russian inline artistic roller skater (born 1998)

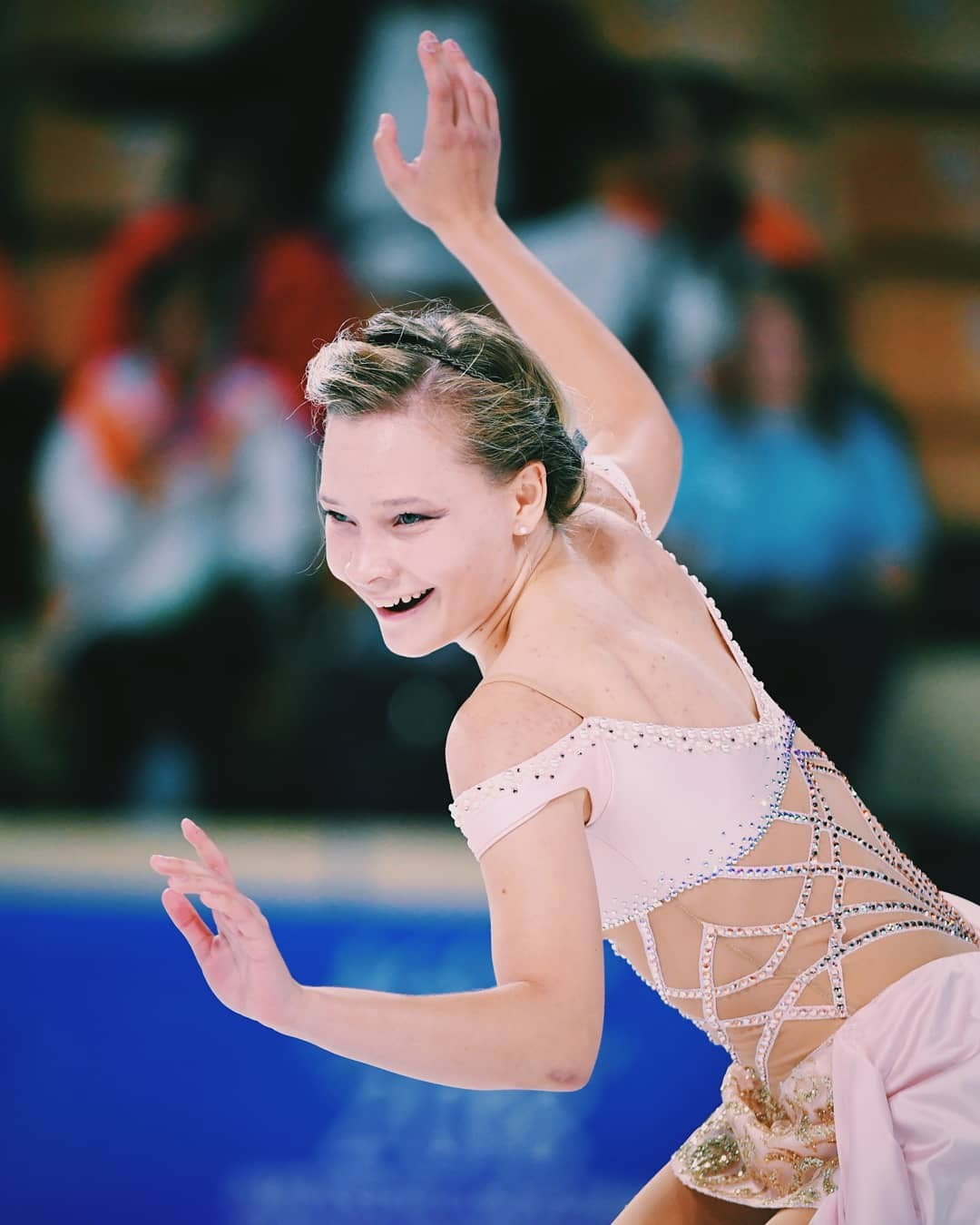
- Anastasia Nosova at World Championship 2018

Personal information
- Native name: Анастасия Антоновна Носова
- Full name: Anastasia Antonovna Nosova
- Other names: Anastasia Nosova
- Born: 28 July 1998 (age 27) Saratov, Russia
- Home town: Zelenograd, Russia

Figure skating career
- Country: Russia

Anastasia Antonovna Nosova (Russian: Анастасия Антоновна Носова) (born 28 July 1998) is a Russian inline artistic roller skater. She is two-times Russian national champion, three-times WIFSA World Open champion, two-times European champion, World champion 2016, vice-champion of World Roller Games 2017 in Junior Ladies Inline, vice-World champion 2018 in Senior Ladies Inline.

She was the first World champion in inline artistic roller skating in Junior category.

Due to the 2022 Russian invasion of Ukraine, World Skate banned Russian athletes from its competitions, and will not stage any events in Russia in 2022.

== Start of career in figure skating ==
She started her skating career on ice in Saratov, Russia, when she was 4 years old. She was 5 when her family moved to Moscow and she came to another figure skating club.

== Inline Artistic Roller Skating ==
Anastasia Nosova came to the floor at 2016 after trauma at figure skating competition on ice. She won Inline Artistic Russian Championship in Junior Category and took her ticket to 6th WIFSA World Open, where she won gold medal and to her first World Championship in Novara, Italy. In Novara Anastasia took gold medal. It was the first gold medal in Junior Category in history at World Championship and the first Worlds Gold for Russia. At 2017 she stood European champion and two-times WIFSA World Open champion in Dijon, France and vice-champion of World Roller Games in Nanjing, China. After World Roller Games she changed the coach and moved from Eismont Elena to Elisabet Martin-Mora, who is teaching a lot of top artistic inline roller skaters all around the World. At 2018 Anastasia came to Senior category, she confirmed her European and WIFSA World Open titles in Cork, Ireland and won silver medal at World Championship 2018 in La Vendee, France.
