= Melissa Comin De Candido =

Italian figure roller skater

Personal information
- Full name: Melissa Comin De Candido
- Born: 28 July 1983 (age 42) San Vito al Tagliamento
- Home town: Casarsa della Delizia
- Height: 1.60 m (5 ft 3 in)

Figure skating career
- Country: Italy

Melissa Comin De Candido (born 28 July 1983) is an Italian figure roller skater. She is an eight-time World medalist (2005, 2006, 2009, 2010, 2011 gold, 2008 silver, 2004, 2007 bronze), a one-time European medalist (2002 bronze) and a six-time Italian Champion.
