= Markus Kaiser =

Canadian soccer player (born 2002)

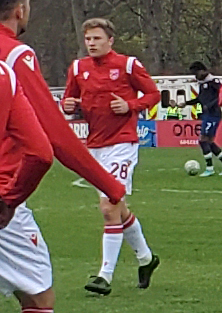
- Kaiser with Cavalry FC in 2022

Personal information
- Date of birth: April 18, 2002 (age 24)
- Place of birth: Calgary, Alberta, Canada
- Height: 1.75 m (5 ft 9 in)
- Position: Midfielder

Youth career
- Willow Ridge-Carburn SC
- Calgary Foothills FC

College career
Years	Team	Apps	(Gls)
2020–	UBC Thunderbirds	77	(3)

Senior career*
Years	Team	Apps	(Gls)
2022	Cavalry FC	6	(0)
2025	Calgary Rangers SC	10	(1)
2026–	Calgary Foothills FC	13	(0)
- * Club domestic league appearances and goals as of September 9, 2026

Markus Kaiser (born April 18, 2002) is a Canadian soccer player who plays as a midfielder for Calgary Foothills FC in the Alberta Premier League.

== Early life ==
Kaiser began playing soccer at age five with Willow Ridge-Carburn SC. He later joined the Calgary Foothills FC youth program. In 2019, he captained the Foothills U17 team, en route to winning the national championship.

== University career ==
In October 2019, Kaiser committed to attend the University of British Columbia and play for their men's soccer team beginning in the fall of 2020. On November 19, 2021, he scored his first goal in the national championship consolation semifinal against the Laval Rouge et Or. In 2021 and 2022, he was named an Academic All-Canadian. In November 2023, he was named a Canada West Player of the Week and at the end of the season was named a Second Team All-Star.

== Club career ==
At the 2022 CPL-U Sports Draft, Kaiser was selected in the second round (14th overall) by Cavalry FC. In May 2022, he signed a U Sports developmental contract with the club, allowing him to maintain his university eligibility. In August, he departed the club to return to UBC, per the terms of his developmental contract. Kaiser played for League1 Alberta club Calgary Foothills in the 2023 League1 Alberta Exhibition Series.

In 2025, Kaiser played with Calgary Rangers SC in League1 Alberta.

== International career ==
In March 2017, he made his debut in the Canadian national program attending a Canada U15 team identification camp.

== Personal life ==
He is the younger brother of fellow soccer player Daniel Kaiser.
