= San Juan de Girón =

Girón San Juan de Girón
- Municipality
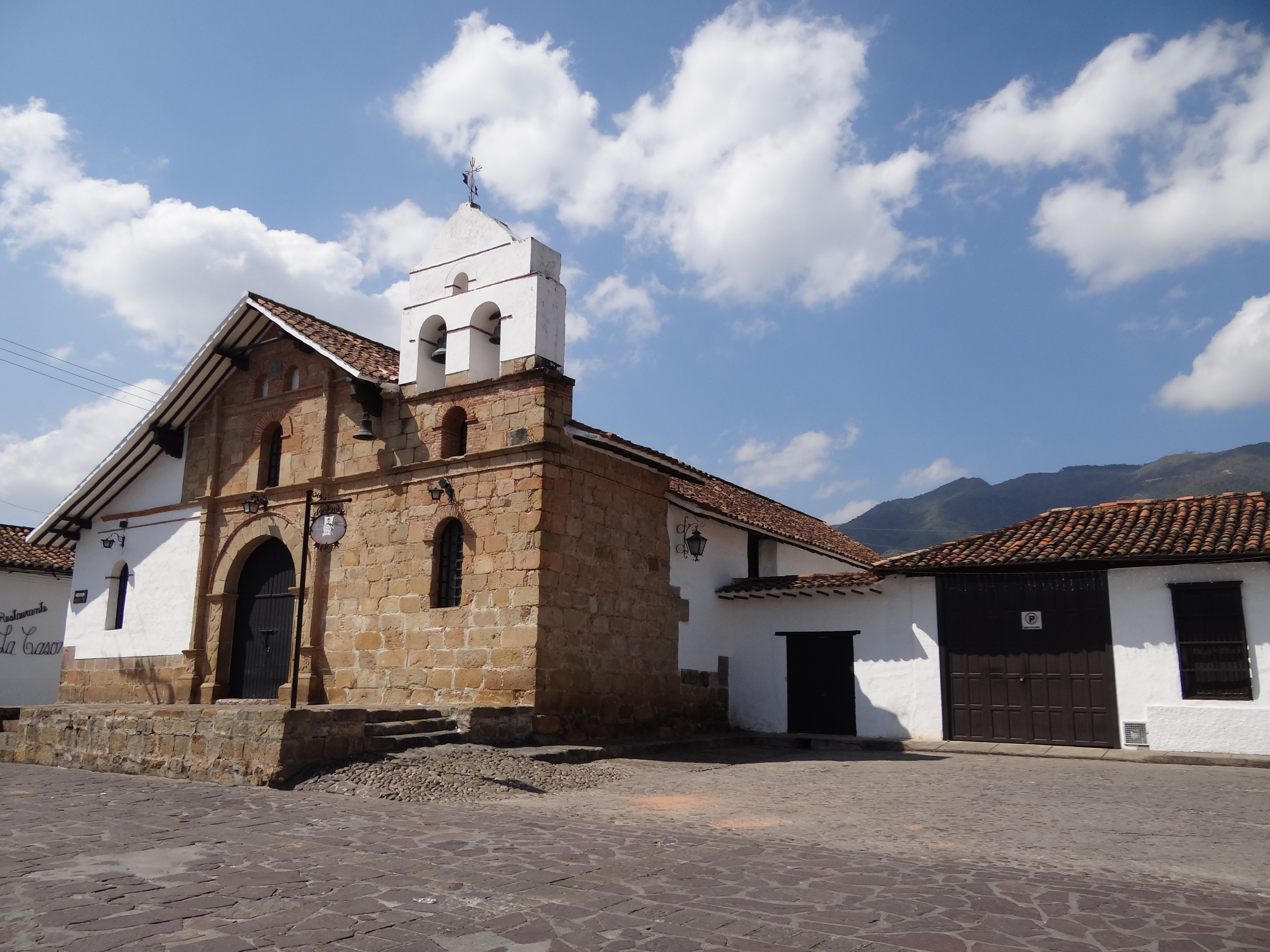
- Nieves Chapel

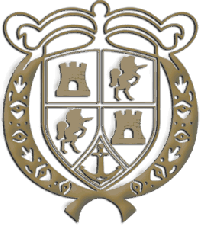
- Flag Coat of arms

- Location of the municipality and town of Girón in the Santander Department of Colombia
- Coordinates: 7°4′15″N 73°10′23″W
- Country: Colombia
- Department: Santander Department
- Province: Soto
- Founded: January 14, 1631
- Moved: December 30, 1968
- Founder: Francisco Mantilla de los Ríos

Government
  - Mayor: Campo Elías Ramirez

Area
  - Municipality: 493 km^{2} (190 sq mi)
  - Urban: 9.74 km^{2} (3.76 sq mi)
- Elevation: 706 m (2,316 ft)

Population (2020 est.)
  - Municipality: 206,005
  - Density: 418/km^{2} (1,080/sq mi)
  - Urban: 152,582
  - Urban density: 15,700/km^{2} (40,600/sq mi)
- DANE
- Demonym: Gironés
- Time zone: UTC-5 (Colombia Standard Time)
- Area code: 57 + 7
- Website: Official website (in Spanish)

San Juan de Girón (better known as Girón), formerly: Villa de los Caballeros de Girón, is a municipality of the Santander Department, which is part of the Bucaramanga Metropolitan area in northeastern Colombia.

== Pueblo Patrimonio ==
Girón was declared a Colombian Pueblo Patrimonio (heritage town) by the Colombian government in 2010.

== National Monument ==
The municipality is known National Monument of Colombia for its old sector characterized by its Spanish colonial architecture (cobblestone streets, houses with white walls, large dark brown and/or black doors, and clay tile roofs).

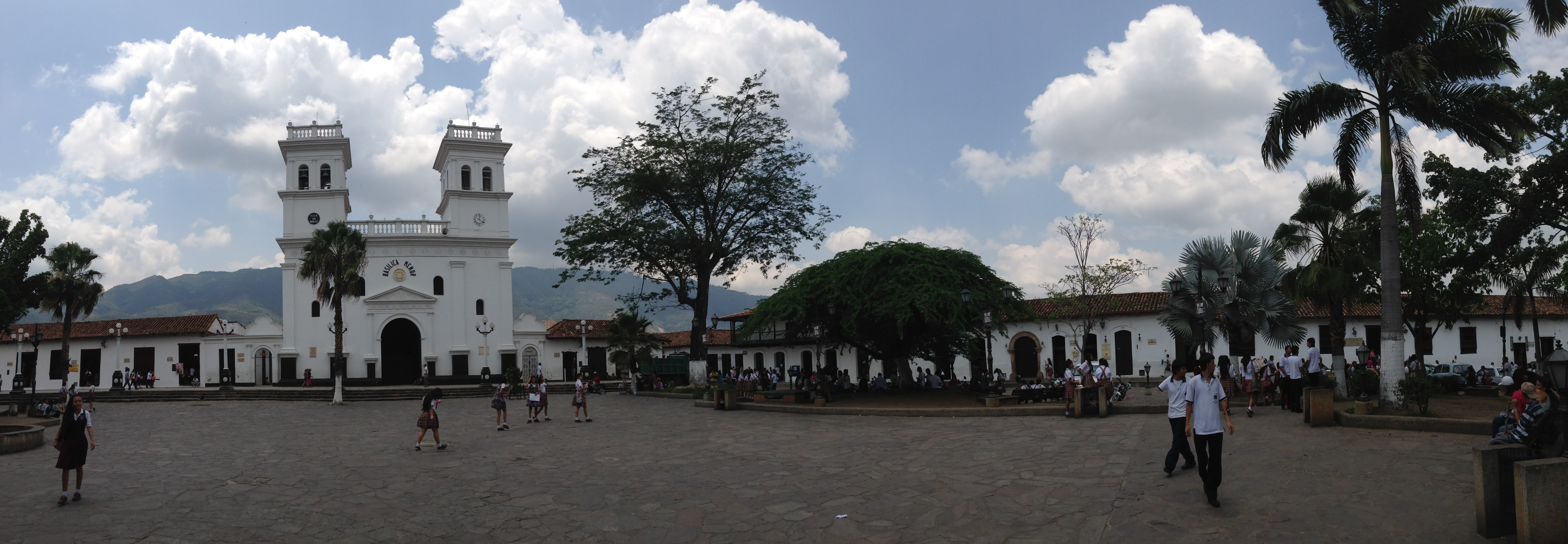
Old sector of the city in Giron, Santander, Colombia.

== Climate ==
Climate data for San Juan de Girón (Llano Grande), elevation 777 m (2,549 ft), (1981–2010)
Month	Jan	Feb	Mar	Apr	May	Jun	Jul	Aug	Sep	Oct	Nov	Dec	Year
Mean daily maximum °C (°F)	30.9 (87.6)	30.7 (87.3)	30.7 (87.3)	30.4 (86.7)	30.8 (87.4)	30.9 (87.6)	31.0 (87.8)	31.2 (88.2)	31.2 (88.2)	30.4 (86.7)	30.4 (86.7)	30.5 (86.9)	30.8 (87.4)
Daily mean °C (°F)	25.2 (77.4)	25.4 (77.7)	25.5 (77.9)	25.3 (77.5)	25.3 (77.5)	25.2 (77.4)	25.2 (77.4)	25.3 (77.5)	25.2 (77.4)	25.1 (77.2)	25.0 (77.0)	25.1 (77.2)	25.2 (77.4)
Mean daily minimum °C (°F)	19.1 (66.4)	19.5 (67.1)	19.9 (67.8)	20.0 (68.0)	20.1 (68.2)	19.6 (67.3)	19.2 (66.6)	19.4 (66.9)	19.4 (66.9)	19.6 (67.3)	19.6 (67.3)	19.2 (66.6)	19.5 (67.1)
Average precipitation mm (inches)	38.5 (1.52)	70.8 (2.79)	105.5 (4.15)	95.0 (3.74)	102.1 (4.02)	71.7 (2.82)	71.3 (2.81)	75.7 (2.98)	90.7 (3.57)	119.6 (4.71)	82.6 (3.25)	25.1 (0.99)	936.3 (36.86)
Average precipitation days	6	7	11	14	15	13	14	15	15	15	10	5	139
Average relative humidity (%)	75	74	76	77	78	78	77	76	76	77	77	76	77
Source: Instituto de Hidrologia Meteorologia y Estudios Ambientales
