= Antonio Panfili =

Italian figure skater

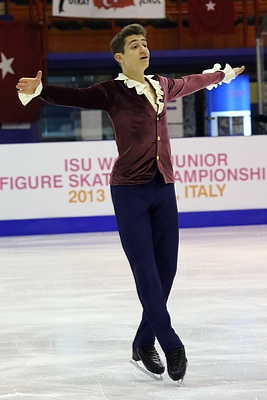

Personal information
- Born: 27 November 1993 (age 32) Venice, Italy
- Home town: Noale, Italy
- Height: 1.72 m (5 ft 7 1/2 in)

Figure skating career
- Country: Italy
- Coach: Roberta Panfili (sister)
- Began skating: 2000
Medal record
Representing Italy
Inline figure skating: Men's singles
WIFSA World Open
| Gold medal – first place | 2016 Milano | Men's singles |
FIRS World Championships
| Bronze medal – third place | 2016 Novara | Men's singles |

Antonio Panfili (born 27 November 1993) is an Italian figure skater, since 2014 he became an in-line figure skater. He is also both an ice and inline coach. He placed 22nd at the 2013 World Junior Championships, 1st at the WIFSA World Open 2016 and 3rd at the FIRS World Championships 2016. He is part of the Pattinaggio Creativo group of skater artist both ice and inline and he performs in many events and in a TV show, Tu Si Que Vales.

== Programs ==
| Season | Short program | Free skating |
|---|---|---|
| 2018-2019 | Minions by Heitor Pereira | Teardrop by Massive Attack |
| 2017-2018 | La La Land by Justin Hurwitz | The Great Gatsby by Craig Armstrong |
| 2016-2017 | Il mondo by Jimmy Fontana | Limelight by Charlie Chaplin |
| 2015-2016 | Il mondo by Jimmy Fontana | Once Upon a Time in the West by Ennio Morricone |
| 2014-2015 | Casanova by Alexandre Desplat | Zorba the Greek by Mikis Theodorakis |
| 2013-2014 | Casanova by Alexandre Desplat | The Sicilian Clan by Ennio Morricone |
| 2012-2013 | Casanova by Alexandre Desplat | Sing, Sing, Sing by Louis Prima |

== Competitive highlights Ice Figure Skating ==
International
| Event | 2009–10 | 2010–11 | 2011–12 | 2012–13 | 2013–14 |
|---|---|---|---|---|---|
| Dragon Trophy | | | | 5th | |
| Finlandia | | | | | 14th |
| Gardena | | | 5th | 8th | 6th |
| Hellmut Seibt | | | | | 9th |
| Merano Cup | | 4th J. | 5th J. | | 11th |
International: Junior
| Event | 2009–10 | 2010–11 | 2011–12 | 2012–13 | 2013–14 |
| Junior Worlds | | | | 22nd | |
| JGP Germany | | | | 9th | |
| JGP Slovenia | | | | 16th | |
| Printemps | | | 3rd J. | | |
| Santa Claus Cup | | | WD | 3rd J. | |
| Skate Celje | 1st J. | | 1st J. | | |
| Triglav Trophy | | 9th J. | 4th J. | | |
National
| Event | 2009–10 | 2010–11 | 2011–12 | 2012–13 | 2013–14 |
| Italian Champ. | 8th J. | 5th J. | 1st J. E | 5th | 5th |

== Competitive highlights Inline Figure Skating ==
International
| Event | 2014–15 | 2015–16 | 2016–17 | 2017–18 | 2018–19 |
|---|---|---|---|---|---|
| World Championships | | 3rd | 2nd | 2nd | |
| European Championships | | | 1st | 1st | |
| WIFSA World Open | | 1st | 2nd | 2nd | |
| Diamond Skate Trophy | | 1st | 1st | 1st | 1st |
| Open de Toulouse | | | | | 1st |
| Open Ukraine | | | | | 1st |
| Trofeo Int. Roll Line | | 1st | 1st | | |
National
| Event | 2014–15 | 2015–16 | 2016–17 | 2017–18 | 2018–19 |
| Campionato Interregionale Inline | | | | | 1st |
| Campionati Italiani AICS | 1st | | | | |
| Trofeo Nazionale Open Inline | 2nd | 1st | | | |
