= Natalie Dunn =

American roller-skater

Natalie Dunn, also known as Natalie Dunn Fries, (born 1956) was the first American woman to win the world championship in figure roller-skating, which she did in 1976. She won her first event at age seven, and won the national women's single at age sixteen.

She was inducted into the Bob Elias Kern County Sports Hall of Fame in February 1978.

In 1979, the Supersisters trading card set was produced and distributed; one of the cards featured Dunn's name and picture.

There is at least one book about her, Natalie Dunn: World Roller Skating Champion by Gloria D. Miklowitz, published by Harcourt Brace Jovanovich in 1979.
