= 787 =

787 may refer to:

== In general ==
- 787 (number), an integer, a number in the 700s
- AD 787, a year in the Common Era
- 787 BC, a year Before the Common Era

== Places ==
- Area code 787, for telephones in Puerto Rico under the North American Numbering Plan
- Highway 787, any of several routes numbered 787; see List of highways numbered 787
- 787 Moskva (asteroid #787), the asteroid Moskva, the 787th asteroid registered

== Military units ==
- 787 Naval Air Squadron, British Royal Navy Fleet Air Arm

=== Ships with the pennant number ===
- USS James E. Kyes (DD-787), a U.S. Navy Cold War era Gearing class destroyer
- USS Marpessa (SP-787), a WW1 U.S. Navy patrol yacht
- USS Washington (SSN-787), a Virginia class U.S. Navy nuclear-powered attack submarine
- Kittanning (YTB-787), a U.S. Navy Natick class tugboat
- HMCS Kingfisher (PCS 787), a Royal Canadian Navy Cold War era Bird class patrol vessel

== Vehicular ==
- Boeing 787 Dreamliner, a jet airliner
- Mazda 787/787B, a Japanese rotary-engine race car which won the 1991 Le Mans Race
- Porsche 787, a race car from the 1960s
- 787 series (JR Kyushu), a train model operated by JR Kyushu

== Other uses ==
- "787" (song), a song by Ivy Queen
- 787 Crew, a U.S. dance team
