= USS Leary (DD-158) =

American Wickes-class destroyer

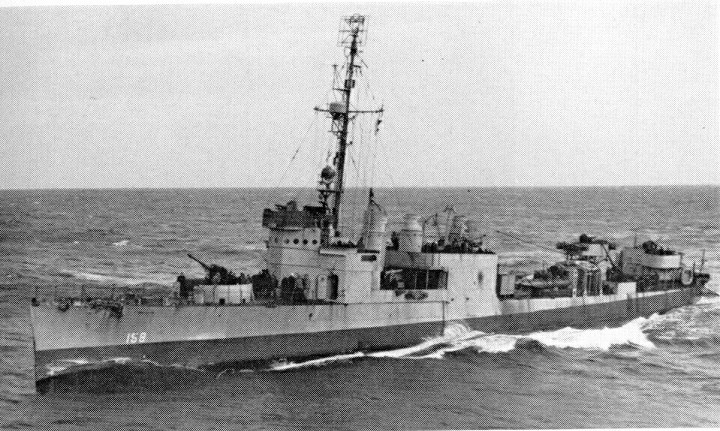
- USS Leary wearing measure 22 camouflage

History

United States
- Name: Leary
- Namesake: Clarence F. Leary
- Builder: New York Shipbuilding, Camden, New Jersey
- Laid down: 6 March 1918
- Launched: 18 December 1918
- Commissioned: 5 December 1919
- Decommissioned: 29 June 1922
- Recommissioned: 1 May 1930
- Fate: Sunk, 24 December 1943

General characteristics
- Class & type: Wickes-class destroyer
- Displacement: 1,090 long tons (1,107 t)
- Length: 314 ft (96 m)
- Beam: 30.5 ft (9.3 m)
- Draft: 12 ft (3.7 m)
- Speed: 35 knots (65 km/h; 40 mph)
- Complement: 176 officers and enlisted
- Armament: 6 × 3 in (76 mm)/23 guns, 6 × 21 in (533 mm) torpedo tubes, 2 × depth charge tracks, 1 × Y-gun

USS Leary (DD-158) was a Wickes-class destroyer in the United States Navy during World War II. She was named for Lieutenant Clarence F. Leary, posthumously awarded the Navy Cross in World War I.

Commissioned in 1919, she saw a number of fleet exercises and training cruises, as well as a period of decommissioning from 1922 to 1930. With the outbreak of World War II, she escorted a number of convoys to Iceland, the Caribbean, and west Africa to support the war effort, later being upgraded to serve as an anti-submarine warfare vessel. On 24 December 1943, while escorting Card through rough seas in the North Atlantic, she was torpedoed three times by the German submarine U-275 and sank with the loss of 98 men.

== Design and construction ==
Leary was one of 111 Wickes-class destroyers built by the United States Navy between 1917 and 1919. She, along with nine of her sisters, were constructed at New York Shipbuilding Corporation shipyards in Camden, New Jersey using specifications and detail designs drawn up by Bethlehem Steel.

She had a standard displacement of 1,090 tonnes (1,070 long tons; 1,200 short tons) an overall length of 314 feet (96 m), a beam of 30 feet 6 inches (9.30 m) and a draught of 12 feet (3.7 m). On trials, Leary reached a speed of 35 knots (65 km/h; 40 mph). She was armed with four 4"/50 caliber guns, two 3"/23 caliber guns, and twelve 21-inch (533 mm) torpedo tubes. She had a regular crew complement of 176 officers and enlisted men. She was driven by two Curtis steam turbines powered by four Yarrow boilers.

Specifics on Leary's performance are not known, but she was one of the group of Wickes-class destroyers known unofficially as the 'Liberty Type' to differentiate them from the destroyers constructed from detail designs drawn up by Bath Iron Works, which used Parsons or Westinghouse turbines. The 'Liberty' type destroyers deteriorated badly in service, and in 1929 all 60 of this group were retired by the Navy. Actual performance of these ships was far below intended specifications especially in fuel economy, with most only able to make 2,300 nautical miles (4,300 km; 2,600 mi) at 15 knots (28 km/h; 17 mph) instead of the design standard of 3,100 nautical miles (5,700 km; 3,600 mi) at 20 knots (37 km/h; 23 mph). The class also suffered problems with turning and weight.

She was the first ship to be named for Clarence F. Leary. A subsequent USS Leary would be commissioned, this one a Gearing-class destroyer completed in 1945.

== Service history ==
Leary was laid down on 6 March 1918 and launched on 18 December 1918. She was sponsored by Mrs. Anne Leary, the mother of Clarence F. Leary. She was commissioned on 5 December 1919.

She departed Boston on 28 January 1920, underwent her shakedown cruise in the Caribbean and then conducted training operations along the East Coast of the United States. In January 1921, she joined the Pacific Battle Fleet, and through February took part in a large-scale battle exercise off the coast of Peru. In March, Leary transited the Panama Canal and reported to the commander of Naval Station Guantanamo Bay, Cuba. She then was on station during bombing tests conducted by the U.S. Army Air Forces against naval targets, overseen by Billy Mitchell. She resumed her training exercises off the Caribbean until June 1922, when in accordance with the Washington Naval Conference, she was decommissioned at the Philadelphia Naval Yard.

Recommissioned on 1 May 1930 with a home port in Newport, Rhode Island, Leary alternated between the Pacific Fleet and the Atlantic Fleet, carrying out training maneuvers and taking part in several fleet problems. After 1935, most of her time was taken up conducting training cruises for reserves and midshipmen. In April 1937, she underwent a shipyard overhaul, including being equipped with a radar. Leary was the first U.S. navy vessel to be equipped with the device. This was a temporary, month long experimental installation.

In September 1939, Leary and Hamilton established a continuous patrol off the coast of New England against German U-boats. On 9 September 1941, she began escort missions to Iceland. DANFS reports that she was also the first to make radar contact with a German U-boat, while escorting a British convoy in the North Atlantic on 17–25 November 1941. This is at odds with her overhaul at the New York Navy Yard in November. This was a yard period where she was rearmed, and might have actually had radar installed. For her to have made contact in the North Atlantic sometime in mid November, then return for an extensive yard period, with plans dated November 29, is unlikely. She is supposedly out on another convoy run on December 4.

With the entry of the United States into World War II following the Japanese attack on Pearl Harbor, Leary undertook regular convoy escort duties. After 26 February 1942, she spent a year escorting convoys from a mid-ocean meeting point to Icelandic ports. On 7 February 1943, she left for Boston and reassignment. During this time, she was given a shipyard overhaul at Boston Navy Yard and converted into an anti-submarine warfare ship. On 1 March, she left Boston for Guantanamo Bay, and undertook anti-submarine exercises with R-5. She then resumed escort duty, and made several trips to Trinidad and several Caribbean ports. Returning to New York on 25 June, she began escorting transatlantic convoys, and successfully escorted two of them through Aruba and to Algiers and Casablanca. She later joined Task Group 21.41 under the command of Captain Arnold J. Isbell and escorting Card.

On 24 December 1943, the task group was caught in a storm in the North Atlantic when at 01:58 in the morning, Leary made a ping on a U-boat off her starboard bow. After her commander, James E. Kyes, ordered her to battle stations but before the destroyer could react, she was struck by a G7es torpedo fired by the German submarine U-275. The torpedo struck her starboard side and detonated in the after engine room, killing all of the men there and damaging both propeller shafts. She quickly developed a 20 degree list to starboard, and was unable to move in the heavy seas. Unbeknownst to the task group, a second German submarine, U-382 fired at Leary but missed. Soon after, Kyes ordered the crew to abandon ship. Two additional torpedoes from U-275 rocked the ship, and it rapidly sank, stern first. She took 98 men with her, including Kyes. Survivors were picked up by her sister ship, Schenck.

Three or four minutes after the second torpedo hit, the executive officer, Lt. R. B. Watson, concluded a quick inspection of the ship, during which he found a thick, gooey substance covering the deck. He was astonished to see two seamen sitting on a torpedo tube, calmly eating Boston cream pie. The cook had just baked a batch, the explosion spattering most of it on the deck.

Leary received one battle star for her service in World War II. For his actions in ensuring the safety of his crew, Kyes was posthumously awarded the Navy Cross. The Gearing-class destroyer James E. Kyes was later named for him.

== Convoys escorted ==
Convoy	Escort Group	Dates	Notes
HX 152		30 Sep – 9 October 1941	from Newfoundland to Iceland prior to US declaration of war
ON 26		20–29 Oct 1941	from Iceland to Newfoundland prior to US declaration of war
ON 28		31 Oct – 3 November 1941	from Iceland to Newfoundland prior to US declaration of war
HX 160		17–25 Nov 1941	from Newfoundland to Iceland prior to US declaration of war; 1st US RADAR detection of submarine
ON 41		4–10 Dec 1941	from Iceland to Newfoundland: war declared during convoy
HX 167		29 December 1941 – 7 January 1942	from Newfoundland to Iceland
ON 55		15–18 Jan 1942	from Iceland to Newfoundland
HX 175	MOEF group A4	15–23 Feb 1942	from Newfoundland to Iceland
SC 77		11–14 April 1942	Iceland shuttle
SC 79		21 April 1942	Iceland shuttle
SC 81		5 May 1942	Iceland shuttle
SC 84		17 May 1942	Iceland shuttle
ON 102		14–21 June 1942	from Iceland to United States
SC 99		12 September 1942	Iceland shuttle
SC 101		28–30 Sep 1942	Iceland shuttle
ON 140		19–24 Oct 1942	Iceland shuttle
SC 105		25–26 Oct 1942	Iceland shuttle
Convoy SC 107		5–7 Nov 1942	Iceland shuttle
SC 109		20–25 Nov 1942	Iceland shuttle
SC 110		2 December 1942	Iceland shuttle
ON 152		11–15 Dec 1942	Iceland shuttle
SC 112		16–19 Dec 1942	Iceland shuttle
ON 160		14–21 Jan 1943	Iceland shuttle
HX 223		22 January 1943	Iceland shuttle
