= 787 series =

787 series may refer to

- 787 series (JR Kyushu), a type of train in Japan
- Boeing 787 Dreamliner, a series of airliners produced by Boeing in the United States

== See also ==
- 787 (disambiguation), various topics
