= James Ellsworth =

James Ellsworth may refer to:

- James Ellsworth (industrialist) (1849–1925), American industrialist, founder of Ellsworth, Pennsylvania
- James Ellsworth (wrestler) (1984), ring name of American professional wrestler James Morris
- James Ellsworth, one of FBI agents who broke the Duquesne Spy Ring

== See also ==
- James Ellsworth De Kay (1792–1851) American zoologist
- James Ellsworth Noland (1920–1992) U.S. Representative from Indiana and United States federal judge
- James E. Kyes (Commander James Ellsworth Kyes, 1906–1943), American naval officer
