= USS Leary =

USS Leary may refer to the following ships of the United States Navy:

- USS Leary (DD-158), a Wickes-class destroyer launched in 1918 and sunk in action in 1943
- USS Leary (DD-879), a Gearing-class destroyer launched in 1945; decommissioned in 1973; transferred to Spain as Langara; struck and scrapped in 1992

== See also ==
- USS Richard P. Leary
