= German submarine U-275 =

German World War II submarine

Coordinates: 50°36′N 0°04′E

History

Nazi Germany
- Name: U-275
- Ordered: 10 April 1941
- Builder: Bremer-Vulkan-Vegesacker Werft, Bremen
- Yard number: 40
- Laid down: 18 January 1941
- Launched: 8 October 1942
- Commissioned: 25 November 1942
- Fate: Sunk on 10 March 1945 in the English Channel by a mine

General characteristics
- Class & type: Type VIIC submarine
- Displacement: 769 tonnes (757 long tons) surfaced; 871 t (857 long tons) submerged
- Length: 67.10 m (220 ft 2 in) o/a; 50.50 m (165 ft 8 in) pressure hull
- Beam: 6.20 m (20 ft 4 in) o/a; 4.70 m (15 ft 5 in) pressure hull
- Height: 9.60 m (31 ft 6 in)
- Draught: 4.74 m (15 ft 7 in)
- Installed power: 2,800–3,200 PS (2,100–2,400 kW; 2,800–3,200 bhp) (diesels); 750 PS (550 kW; 740 shp) (electric)
- Propulsion: 2 shafts; 2 × diesel engines; 2 × electric motors
- Speed: 17.7 knots (32.8 km/h; 20.4 mph) surfaced; 7.6 knots (14.1 km/h; 8.7 mph) submerged
- Range: 8,500 nmi (15,700 km; 9,800 mi) at 10 knots (19 km/h; 12 mph) surfaced; 80 nmi (150 km; 92 mi) at 4 knots (7.4 km/h; 4.6 mph) submerged
- Test depth: 230 m (750 ft); Crush depth: 250–295 m (820–968 ft)
- Complement: 4 officers, 40–56 enlisted
- Armament: 5 × 53.3 cm (21 in) torpedo tubes (four bow, one stern); 14 × torpedoes or 26 TMA mines; 1 × 8.8 cm (3.46 in) deck gun (220 rounds); 1 × twin 2 cm (0.79 in) C/30 anti-aircraft gun

Service record
- Part of: 8th U-boat Flotilla; 25 November 1942 – 31 May 1943; 3rd U-boat Flotilla; 1 June 1943 – 30 September 1944; 11th U-boat Flotilla; 1 October 1944 – 10 March 1945
- Identification codes: M 50 344
- Commanders: Oblt.z.S. Helmut Bork; 25 November 1942 – July 1944; Oblt.z.S. Helmuth Wehrkamp; July 1944 – 10 March 1945
- Operations: 9 patrols: 1st patrol: a. 4 – 8 September 1943; b. 9 September – 28 October 1943; 2nd patrol: a. 29 November – 1 December 1943; b. 2 – 7 December 1943; c. 8 December 1943 – 11 January 1944; d. 23 – 26 April 1944; 3rd patrol: 20 – 23 May 1944; 4th patrol: 6 – 25 June 1944; 5th patrol: 16 July – 2 August 1944; 6th patrol: 13 August – 18 September 1944; 7th patrol: 2 – 12 December 1944; 8th patrol: 13 January – 10 February 1945; 9th patrol: 25 February – 10 March 1945
- Victories: 1 merchant ship sunk (4,934 GRT); 1 warship sunk (1,090 tons)

German submarine U-275 was a Type VIIC U-boat of Nazi Germany's Kriegsmarine during World War II. The submarine was laid down on 18 January 1942 at the Bremer-Vulkan-Vegesacker Werft (yard) in Bremen as yard number 40. She was launched on 8 October 1942 and commissioned on 25 November under the command of Oberleutnant zur See Helmut Bork.

She sank two ships of 4,934 gross register tons (GRT) in nine patrols and 1,090 tons. She was a member of four wolfpacks.

She was sunk by a mine in the English Channel on 10 March 1945.

== Design ==
German Type VIIC submarines were preceded by the shorter Type VIIB submarines. U-275 had a displacement of 769 tonnes (757 long tons) when at the surface and 871 tonnes (857 long tons) while submerged. She had a total length of 67.10 m (220 ft 2 in), a pressure hull length of 50.50 m (165 ft 8 in), a beam of 6.20 m (20 ft 4 in), a height of 9.60 m (31 ft 6 in), and a draught of 4.74 m (15 ft 7 in). The submarine was powered by two Germaniawerft F46 four-stroke, six-cylinder supercharged diesel engines producing a total of 2,800 to 3,200 metric horsepower (2,060 to 2,350 kW; 2,760 to 3,160 shp) for use while surfaced, two AEG GU 460/8–27 double-acting electric motors producing a total of 750 metric horsepower (550 kW; 740 shp) for use while submerged. She had two shafts and two 1.23 m (4 ft) propellers. The boat was capable of operating at depths of up to 230 metres (750 ft).

The submarine had a maximum surface speed of 17.7 knots (32.8 km/h; 20.4 mph) and a maximum submerged speed of 7.6 knots (14.1 km/h; 8.7 mph). When submerged, the boat could operate for 80 nautical miles (150 km; 92 mi) at 4 knots (7.4 km/h; 4.6 mph); when surfaced, she could travel 8,500 nautical miles (15,700 km; 9,800 mi) at 10 knots (19 km/h; 12 mph). U-275 was fitted with five 53.3 cm (21 in) torpedo tubes (four fitted at the bow and one at the stern), fourteen torpedoes, one 8.8 cm (3.46 in) SK C/35 naval gun, 220 rounds, and one twin 2 cm (0.79 in) C/30 anti-aircraft gun. The boat had a complement of between forty-four and sixty.

== Service history ==
After training with the 8th U-boat Flotilla, the boat became operational on 1 June 1943 when she was transferred to the 3rd flotilla. U-275 carried out a series of short voyages between Kiel in Germany and Bergen and Trondheim in Norway in August 1943.

=== First patrol ===
The boat's first patrol proper began when she departed Bergen on 4 September 1943. She entered the Atlantic Ocean after negotiating the gap between Iceland and the Faroe Islands. She was unsuccessfully attacked by a Lockheed Hudson southwest of Iceland. She reached La Pallice in occupied France on 28 October.

=== Second patrol ===
The boat's second foray was divided into a series of short bursts between La Pallice and Brest between November 1943 and April 1944. During one of these sallies, she sank the USS Leary, an American destroyer, on 24 December 1943.

Another moment of drama came when the submarine was obliged to return to base on 3 January with the captain suffering from appendicitis.

=== Third and fourth patrols ===
Patrol number three was similarly short, starting and finishing in Brest on 20 and 23 May 1944.

Not long after D-Day (6 June 1944) on her fourth sortie, having been identified by Cryptanalysis of the Enigma intercepts, which was confirmed with a solo photographic reconnaissance Spitfire from No. 541 Squadron RAF, she was attacked by no less than eight Hawker Typhoon strike attack aircraft of No. 263 Squadron RAF while tied up in Saint Peter Port Harbour, Guernsey on 14 June. No damage was caused to the submarine; escorting vessels were not so lucky.

=== Fifth patrol ===
While negotiating the relatively shallow waters of the English Channel, the submarine was discovered by an aircraft which vectored a hunter-killer group onto her. She then spent seven hours being chased before she shook off her pursuers.

The situation had become so dire that the boat was chased every time she raised her periscope. She eventually reached comparative safety in Boulogne on 2 August 1944.

U-275 reached Boulogne in the night from 31 Juli on 1 August 1944.

=== Sixth patrol ===
It was decided to send U-275 back to Norwegian waters. She sailed westward, the 'long' way around the British Isles. She had almost reached Bergen on 18 September 1944, when she was attacked by a total of eight De Havilland Mosquitos. Two were armed with the Tse tse 6-pounder cannon, four more were equipped with depth charges, (they were all from 248 Squadron), while the last two, from 235 Squadron, were there as escorts.

The submarine grounded in water that was only about 9 m (30 ft) deep. She was strafed and bombed while half submerged. However, luck was on the U-boat's side; one cannon jammed and two bombs failed to release. A coastal battery also fired on the British aircraft, causing them to leave the scene of the attack. The U-boat, having suffered some damage, then made her way to her destination.

=== Seventh and eighth patrols ===
These two patrols were relatively trouble-free, but the boat did return to the French Atlantic coast, docking at St. Nazaire on 10 February 1945.

=== Ninth patrol and loss ===
Having departed St. Nazaire on 25 February 1945, she headed for the English Channel once more. On 8 March she sank the Lornaston northwest of Fécamp. On the tenth, she struck a mine off Beachy Head and sank.

Forty-eight men died; there were no survivors.

=== Wolfpacks ===
U-275 took part in four wolfpacks, namely:

- Leuthen (15 – 24 September 1943)
- Rossbach (24 September – 9 October 1943)
- Borkum (18 December 1943 – 3 January 1944)
- Dragoner (21 – 22 May 1944)

== Summary of raiding history ==
Date	Name	Nationality	Tonnage (Note: Merchant ship tonnages are in gross register tons. Military vessels are listed by tons displacement.)	Fate
24 December 1943	USS Leary	United States Navy	1,090	Sunk
8 March 1945	Lornaston	United Kingdom	4,934	Sunk

== Bibliography ==
- Busch, Rainer; Röll, Hans-Joachim (1999). German U-boat commanders of World War II : a biographical dictionary. Translated by Brooks, Geoffrey. London, Annapolis, Md: Greenhill Books, Naval Institute Press. ISBN 1-55750-186-6.
- Busch, Rainer; Röll, Hans-Joachim (1999). Der U-Boot-Krieg, 1939-1945: Deutsche U-Boot-Verluste von September 1939 bis Mai 1945 [German U-boat losses from September 1939 to May 1945] (in German). Vol. IV. Hamburg, Berlin, Bonn: Mittler. ISBN 3-8132-0514-2.
- Gröner, Erich; Jung, Dieter; Maass, Martin (1991). U-boats and Mine Warfare Vessels. German Warships 1815–1945. Vol. 2. Translated by Thomas, Keith; Magowan, Rachel. London: Conway Maritime Press. ISBN 0-85177-593-4.
- Kemp, Paul (1999). U-Boats Destroyed - German Submarine Losses in the World Wars. London: Arms & Armour. ISBN 1-85409-515-3.
