= Polly Blodgett =

American figure skater

Pauline Blodgett Watson (April 13, 1919 - November 12, 2018) was an American figure skater, and a member of Boston Skating Club. She competed in both singles, winning the US junior title in 1934, and pairs, with partner Roger Turner, with whom she won the US junior pairs title in 1934, and finished runners up in the senior pairs in 1936.

Watson grew up in Brookline, Massachusetts and owned a dress shop there for 30 years. In 1943 she married Robert B. Watson.

== Results ==
=== Ladies' singles ===
Event	1937	1938	1939
U.S. Championships	2nd	3rd	5th

=== Pairs ===
(with Turner)

Event	1936
U.S. Championships	2nd
