= USS Calabash =

Civilian motor yacht that served as an armed patrol boat in the US Navy

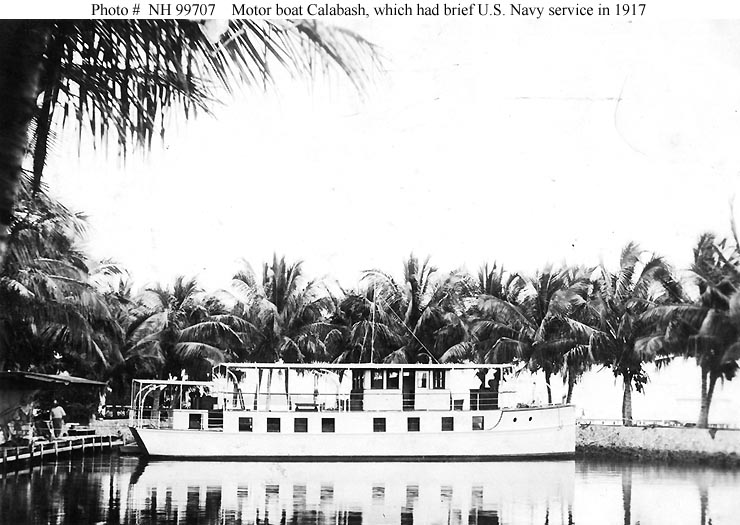
- Calabash in a Florida harbor as a civilian motorboat sometime between 1912 and 1917.

History

United States
- Name: USS Calabash
- Namesake: Previous name retained
- Owner: William John Matheson
- Yard number: 24
- Completed: 1912
- Acquired: 25 July 1917
- Commissioned: 25 July 1917
- Decommissioned: August 1917
- Fate: Returned to owner August 1917
- Notes: Operated as private motorboat Calabash 1912-1917 and from 1917

General characteristics
- Type: Section patrol vessel
- Tonnage: 64 GRT
- Length: 66 ft (20 m)
- Beam: 66.7 ft (20.3 m)
- Depth: 8.1 ft (2.5 m)

USS Calabash (SP-108) was a civilian motor yacht that served in the 7th Naval District as an armed patrol boat in the United States Navy during July and August 1917. Apparently found unsuitable for naval service, Calabash served for less than a month before being decommissioned and returned to her owner in August 1917.

Calabash was built in 1912 by Mathis Shipbuilding Company at Camden, New Jersey, for William John Matheson of New York and Coconut Grove, Florida. The vessel was of a type described as a "houseboat" built by Mathis and others and was Mathis hull number 24, assigned official number 210659 and signal letters LCQG on registration. The vessel's registration shows 64 GRT, length 66 ft (20 m), breadth 66.7 ft (20.3 m), depth 8.1 ft (2.5 m) (Note: "Depth" is not "draft" but a different measure. This type of "cruiser houseboat" was designed with fairly shallow draft.) and home port of Miami.

Calabash was based at the Matheson estate where he experimented with planting, particularly coconuts, and built "Mashta House" where Matheson, as Commodore of the Biscayne Bay Yacht Club frequently entertained guests gathering by boat. The original house is now gone, but the harbor that was home port for Calabash and temporary port for other Matheson vessels when in Florida remains. The Chowder Party was an annual event hosted by Matheson that attracted a fleet of visiting boats.

The U.S. Navy acquired Calabash on 25 July 1917 for use as a section patrol vessel during World War I. She was commissioned the same day as USS Calabash (SP-108). By August 1917, three of Matheson's yachts were in government service: Marpessa, Calabash, and Coco.
