= Robert B. Watson (administrator) =

Robert Blake Watson (December 14, 1913 – August 12, 2000) was an administrator at Harvard University who served as the dean of students from 1958 to 1970 and athletic director from 1970 to 1978.

== Early life ==
Watson was born in Wellesley, Massachusetts on December 14, 1913, to Edward A. and Irene J. (Brown) Watson. He grew up in Wellesley and graduated from St. Mark's School. He attended Harvard College, where he lettered in football and crew. He graduated in 1937 and worked for JP Morgan until 1940, when he joined the United States Navy. During World War II he served as the executive officer on the USS Leary. He was one of 220 men on board the Leary when it was sunk on December 24, 1943. After giving his life jacket to another crew member, Watson clung to a piece of wood for five hours in the waters of the North Atlantic until another warship rescued him and the other 56 survivors. He was discharged in 1946 with the rank of Commander.

== Harvard ==
Watson returned to Harvard in 1946 as associate dean and a member of the New Fund Council. He worked primarily on extra-curricular activities. He served as acting dean of the college in 1957 while Delmar Leighton on sabbatical.

In 1958, Watson was appointed dean of students. In this role, Watson was in charge of student housing, activities, and organizations. The 1969–1970 academic year saw a number of protests against the Vietnam War. He was forcibly removed from his office by students four times and appeared at the trials of 27 students. Due to the unrest, Watson wanted to step down and allow a younger person to take over as dean. On January 12, 1970, it was announced that Watson would succeed Adolph Samborski as Harvard's athletic director on August 31, 1970. Watson had previously served as acting athletic director while Thomas Bolles was on sabbatical from 1960 to 1961 and had been the chairman of the faculty committee on athletic sports since 1963. He was succeeded as dean of students by Archie Epps, who was the first African American to hold the job.

As athletic director, Watson oversaw the merger of Radcliffe College's athletic programs into the Harvard athletic department, began work on a multimillion-dollar renovation of the school's athletic facilities, and hired coaches Joe Restic, Satch Sanders, and Bill Cleary. He retired in 1978.

== Personal life ==
On January 31, 1943, Watson married figure skater Polly Blodgett at the Portland Country Club. The best man was Franklin D. Roosevelt Jr., Watson's classmate at Harvard and his shipmate in the Navy. Watson and Blodgett had five children.

Watson died on August 12, 2000, at his home in Bourne, Massachusetts.
