= USS Coco =

Patrol vessel of the United States Navy

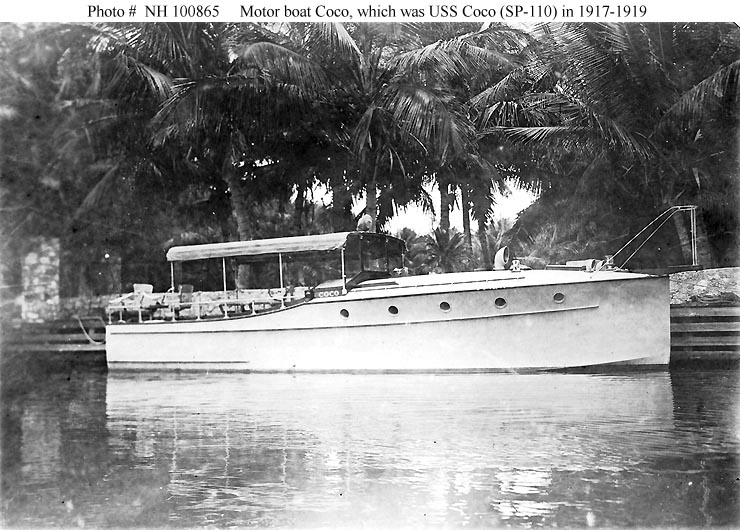
- Coco as a civilian motorboat in Florida waters in 1917, prior to her United States Navy service.

History

United States
- Name: USS Coco
- Namesake: Previous name retained
- Builder: Albany Boat Corporation, Watervliet, New York
- Completed: 1917
- Acquired: 23 June 1917
- Commissioned: 23 July 1917
- Stricken: 23 June 1919
- Fate: Sold, 5 August 1919; Wrecked prior to delivery to new owner, 9–10 September 1919
- Notes: Operated as private motorboat Coco, 1917

General characteristics
- Type: Section patrol vessel
- Length: 36 ft (11 m)
- Beam: 9 ft (2.7 m)
- Draft: 2.5 ft (0.76 m)
- Propulsion: 1 Sterling 8 cylinder engine, 200 horsepower
- Speed: 26 kn (30 mph; 48 km/h)
- Armament: 1 machine gun

USS Coco (SP-110) was an armed motorboat that served in the United States Navy as a Section patrol vessel from 1917 to 1919.

Coco was built in 1917 by the Albany Boat Corporation at Watervliet, New York for William John Matheson of New York and Coconut Grove, Florida. The U.S. Navy purchased Coco from her owner for $5,500 on 23 June 1917 for use as a section patrol boat during World War I. She was commissioned on 23 July 1917 as USS Coco (SP-110) armed with one machine gun. The motorboat's dimensions were 36 ft (11 m) length, 9 ft (2.7 m) beam with a draft of 2.5 ft (0.76 m) and 6 GRT with a maximum speed of 26 knots (30 mph; 48 km/h) and cruising speed of 20 knots (23 mph; 37 km/h) with one Sterling eight cylinder engine of 200 indicated horsepower. (Note: The boat's Dictionary of American Naval Fighting Ships entry states that Coco served in a non-commissioned status, but the contemporary Ships' Data U.S. Naval Vessels states that she was commissioned with date.)

Assigned to the Section patrol in the 7th Naval District, Coco served in Florida waters for the rest of the war and for some months after the fighting ended. Coco was one three of Matheson's yachts in government service, the others being Marpessa and Calabash. Coco was stricken from the Naval Vessel Register on 23 June 1919.

The motorboat was sold on 5 August. Before she could be delivered to her new owner, M. C. Carmichael, she was among several patrol boats wrecked in the 1919 Florida Keys hurricane on 9–10 September while anchored in North Beach Basin at Key West, Florida.
