= Opelika (YTB-798) =

Tugboat of the United States Navy

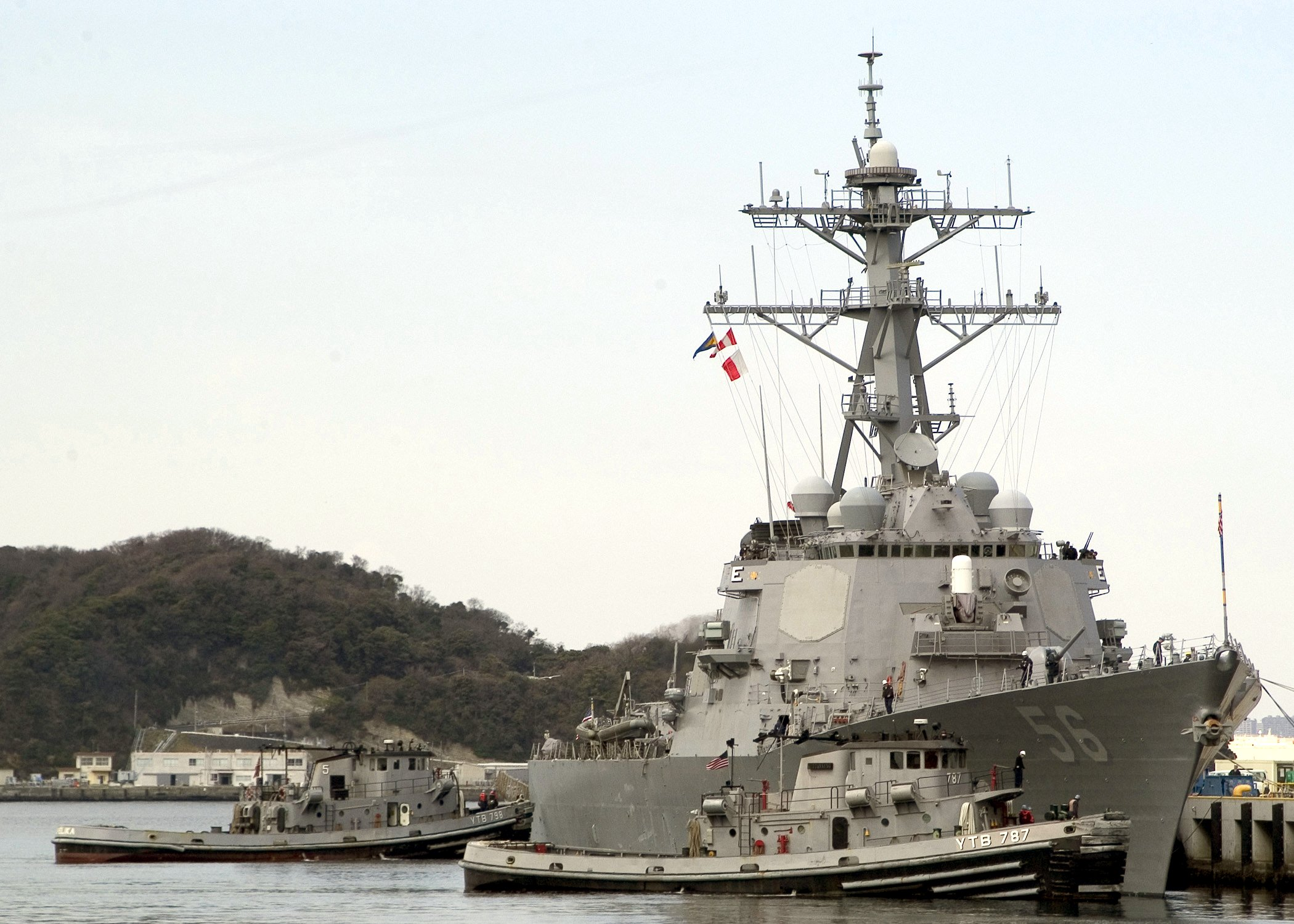
- Kittanning (YTB-787) and Opelika assist the Arleigh Burke-class destroyer USS John S. McCain (DDG-56) away from the pier at Commander Fleet Activities Yokosuka, Japan (CFAY).

History

United States
- Ordered: 15 June 1967
- Builder: Marinette Marine, Marinette, Wisconsin
- Laid down: 23 February 1968
- Launched: 21 August 1968
- Acquired: 30 January 1969
- Stricken: 2 February 2015
- Fate: Disposed through the General Services Administration

General characteristics
- Class & type: Natick-class large harbor tug
- Displacement: 283 long tons (288 t) (light); 356 long tons (362 t) (full)
- Length: 109 ft (33 m)
- Beam: 31 ft (9.4 m)
- Draft: 14 ft (4.3 m)
- Speed: 12 knots (14 mph; 22 km/h)
- Complement: 12
- Armament: None

Opelika (YTB–798) was a United States Navy Natick-class large harbor tug named for Opelika, Alabama.

== Construction ==
The contract for Opelika was awarded 15 June 1967. She was laid down on 23 February 1968 at Marinette, Wisconsin, by Marinette Marine and launched 21 August 1968.

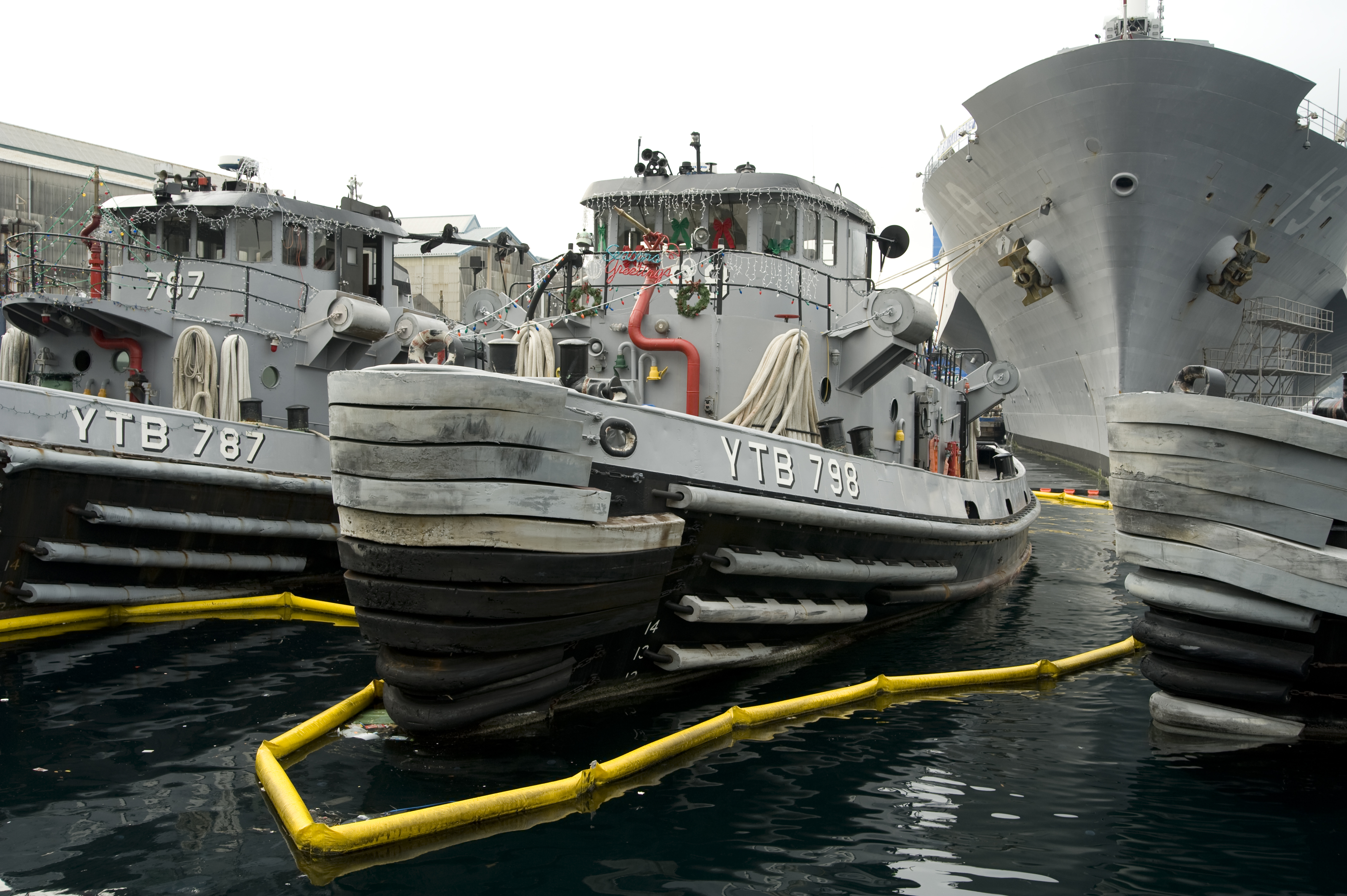
Opelika at Yokosuka, Japan

== Operational history ==
Opelika was delivered to the Navy 30 January 1968 for service at the Naval Station Subic Bay, Philippines. She continued busy operations there until that base closed in 1992. She was transferred to Naval Station Yokosuka, Japan. She was struck from the naval register in February 2015.
