= USS Marpessa =

Patrol vessel of the United States Navy

History

United States
- Name: USS Marpessa
- Namesake: Previous name retained
- Owner: William John Matheson
- Builder: Mathis Yacht Building Company, Camden, New Jersey
- Yard number: 60
- Completed: 1916
- Acquired: 18 August 1917
- Commissioned: 1 October 1917
- Fate: Returned to owner 7 January 1919
- Notes: Operated as private motorboat Marpessa 1916-1917 and from 1919

General characteristics
- Type: Section patrol vessel
- Tonnage: 17 Gross register tons
- Length: 50 ft (15.24 m)
- Beam: 10 ft 1 in (3.07 m)
- Draft: 3 ft (0.91 m)
- Propulsion: Two six cylinder 175 horsepower Van Blercks gasoline engines
- Speed: 20 knots
- Complement: 11
- Armament: 1 × machine gun

USS Marpessa (SP-787) was a 50-foot (15.24 m) "express yacht" that became a United States Navy section patrol vessel in commission from 1917 to 1919 retaining the civilian name. (Note: The Dictionary of American Naval Fighting Ships has a typographical error giving her length as 10 inches (0.25 meter).)

Marpessa was designed by T. B. Taylor for William John Matheson of New York built by the Mathis Yacht Building Company at Camden, New Jersey as hull number 60 in 1916 and, upon registration, was assigned official number 214285. Matheson had an estate at Coconut Grove, Florida and entered Marpessa, powered by two six cylinder 175 horsepower Van Blercks gasoline engines, in racing events, particularly the annual Miami regattas in January involving power boats brought from the north as well as boats based in the Miami area. The boat was badly damaged when a hired captain, over the owner's objection, held course after finding himself inside the buoy and struck a reef off Matinicock point near Oyster Bay.

On 18 August 1917, the U.S. Navy acquired her from her owner for use as a section patrol boat during World War I. She was enrolled in the Naval Coast Defense Reserve on 8 September 1917 and commissioned as USS Marpessa (SP-787) on 1 October 1917. By August 1917 three of Matheson's yachts were in government service: Marpessa, Calabash, and Coco.

Assigned to the 7th Naval District and based at Marathon, Florida, Marpessa patrolled the southern Atlantic coast of Florida for the rest of World War I.

Marpessa was returned to Matheson on 7 January 1919.
