= Kittanning (YTB-787) =

Tugboat of the United States Navy

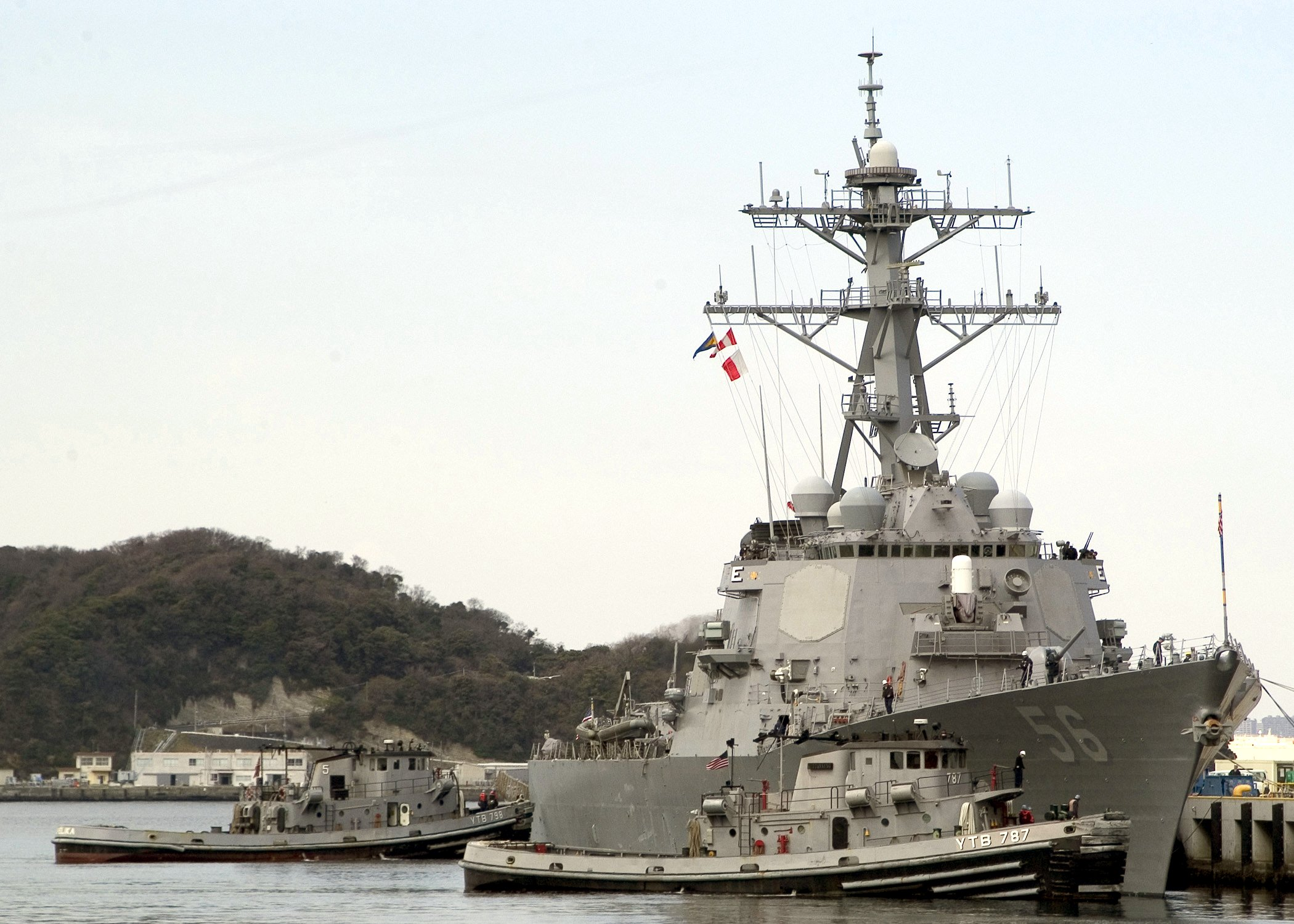
- Kittanning (YTB-787) and Opelika (YTB-798) assist the Arleigh Burke-class destroyer USS John S. McCain (DDG-56) away from the pier at Commander Fleet Activities Yokosuka, Japan (CFAY).

History

United States
- Ordered: 14 January 1965
- Builder: Marinette Marine, Marinette, Wisconsin
- Laid down: 22 December 1965
- Launched: 29 March 1966
- Acquired: 19 May 1966
- Stricken: 8 May 2013
- Identification: IMO number: 8781155; MMSI number: 455428000; Callsign: 8QKV
- Status: Sold, departed Yokosuka 21 October 2015.

General characteristics
- Class & type: Natick-class large harbor tug
- Displacement: 283 long tons (288 t) (light); 356 long tons (362 t) (full)
- Length: 109 ft (33 m)
- Beam: 31 ft (9.4 m)
- Draft: 14 ft (4.3 m)
- Speed: 12 knots (14 mph; 22 km/h)
- Complement: 12
- Armament: None

Kittanning (YTB-787) is a United States Navy Natick-class large harbor tug named for Kittanning, Pennsylvania.

== Construction ==
The contract for Kittanning was awarded 14 January 1965. She was laid down on 22 December 1965 at Marinette, Wisconsin, by Marinette Marine and launched 29 March 1966.

== Operational history ==
Kittanning was placed in service in the Pacific Fleet 27 October 1966; and in 1967 assigned to Naval Station Yokosuka, Japan, assisting ships of the American and Allied navies in the Far East. It was then sold to a buyer in Panama. Last known location: Busan, South Korea.

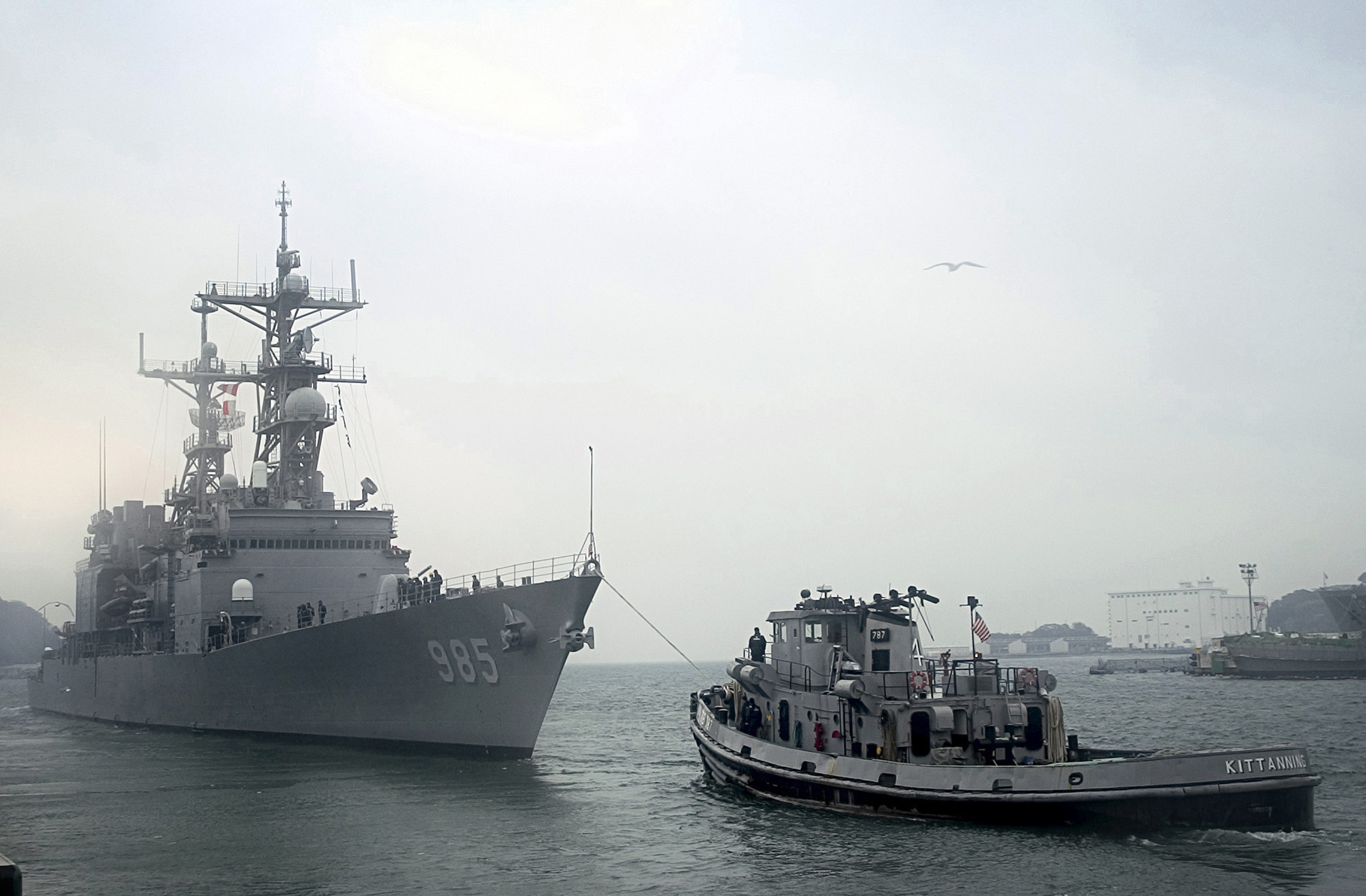
Kittanning tows USS Cushing (DD-985)

Kittanning at Yokosuka, Japan

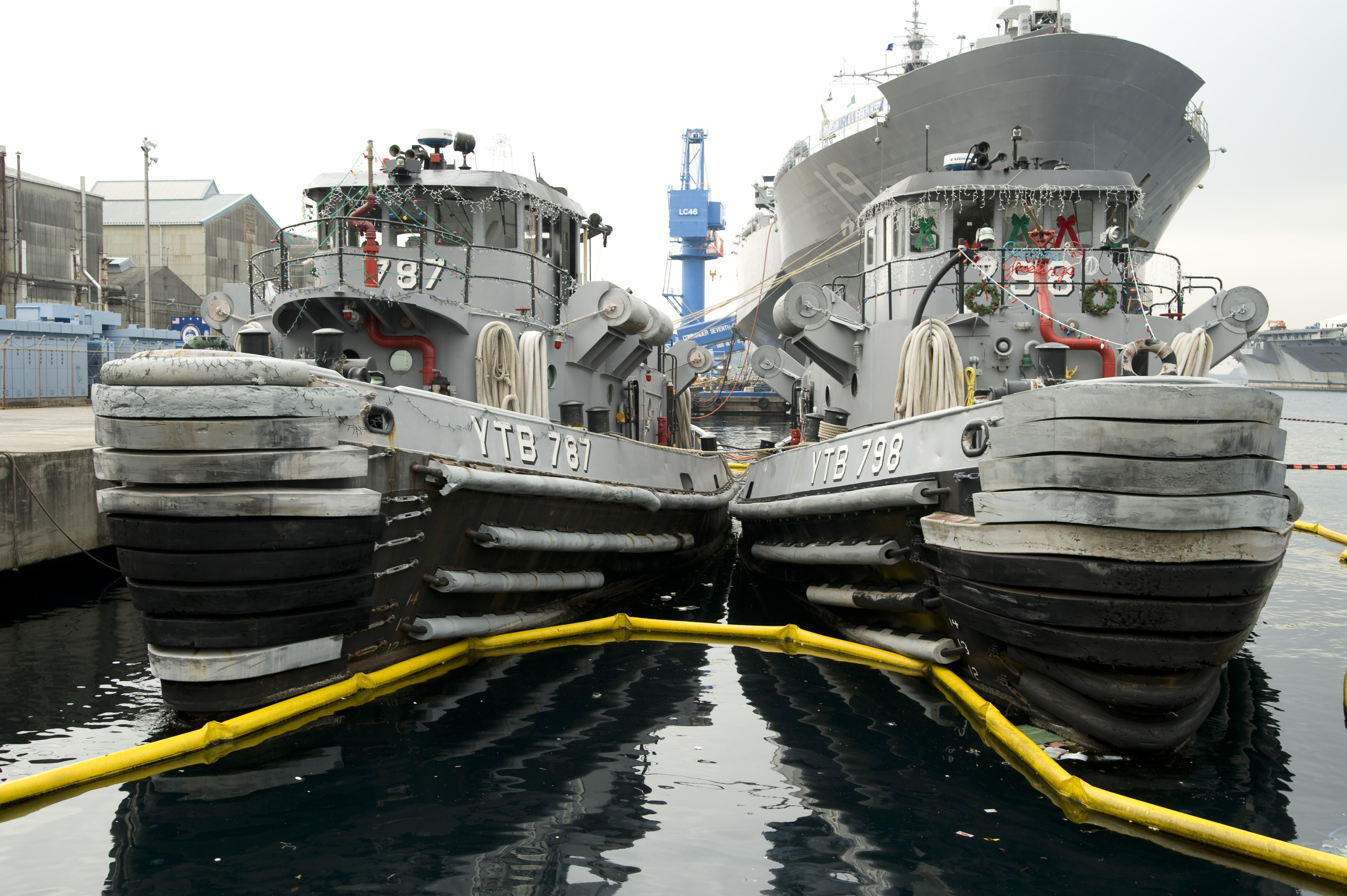
Kittanning and Opelika (YTB-798) at Yokosuka, Japan
