= Clarence F. Leary =

- Birth name: Clarence Frederick Leary
- Born: 11 January 1894; Fowey, England
- Died: 20 July 1918 (aged 24)
- Service / branch: United States Navy Reserve
- Commands: USS Charlton Hall
- Battles / wars: World War I

Clarence Frederick Leary (11 January 1894 – 20 July 1918) was an officer in the United States Navy during World War I.

Leary was born in Fowey, England, and soon immigrated with his family to the United States. After the US entered World War I, on 12 June 1918 he was commissioned as a lieutenant in the Naval Reserve. He was later appointed the Executive Officer of the cargo ship USS Charlton Hall (ID-1359), with Lieutenant Commander J. L. Evans, USNRF, in command of the ship.

On 20 July 1918, a fire broke out in the hold of the Charlton Hall. Leary entered the burning hold in order to save crewmen who were trapped there. He died hours later of burns and smoke inhalation.

Lieutenant Clarence F. Leary was posthumously awarded the Navy Cross for his self-sacrificing valor.

== Namesakes ==
Two ships, USS Leary, were named for him.
