= USS Leary (DD-879) =

Gearing-class destroyer

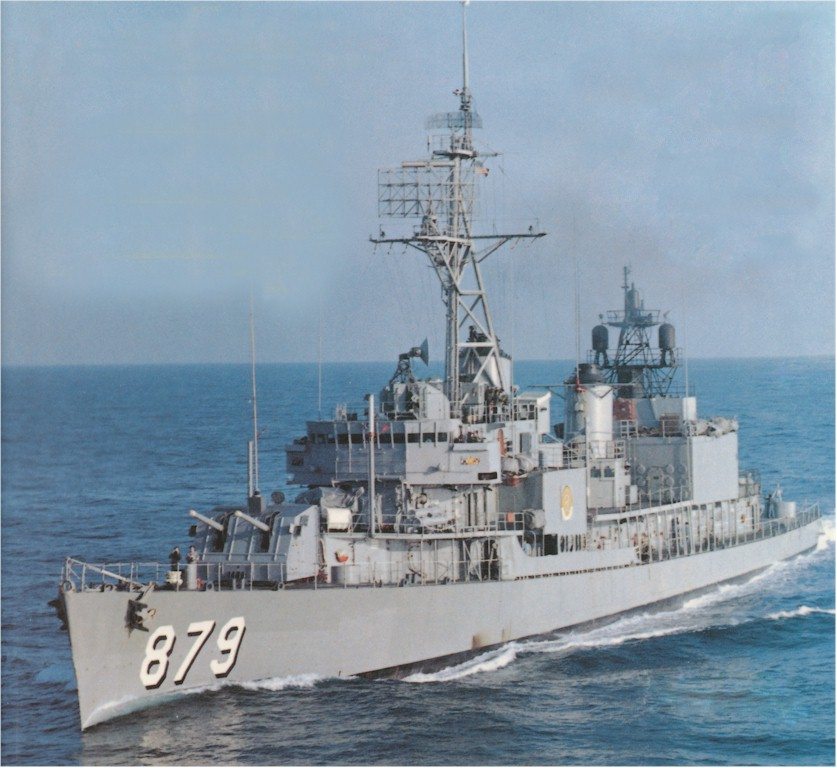
- USS Leary underway in 1972

History

United States
- Name: Leary
- Namesake: Clarence F. Leary
- Builder: Consolidated Steel Corporation
- Laid down: 11 August 1944
- Launched: 20 January 1945
- Commissioned: 7 May 1945
- Decommissioned: 31 October 1973
- In service: 23 June 1945
- Reclassified: DDR-879, 1949
- Identification: Callsign: NBHS; Hull number: DD-879
- Motto: No Quarter
- Fate: Transferred to Spain, 1978
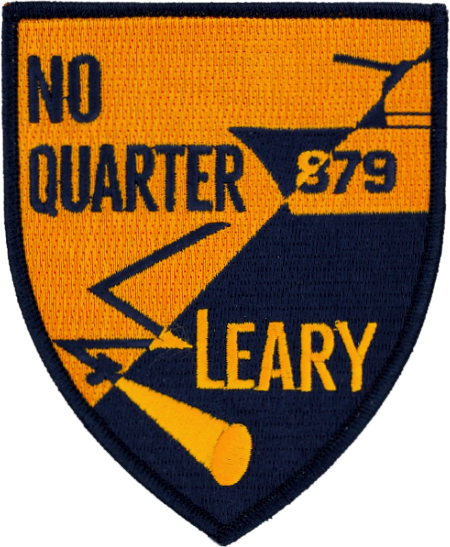
- Badge

Spain
- Name: Langara
- Namesake: Juan de Lángara
- Acquired: 17 May 1978
- Decommissioned: 1992
- Stricken: 1992
- Identification: Hull number: D-64
- Fate: Scrapped, 1994

General characteristics
- Class & type: Gearing-class destroyer; Churruca-class destroyer
- Displacement: 3,460 tons
- Length: 390 ft 6 in (119.02 m)
- Beam: 41 ft 1 in (12.52 m)
- Draft: 18 ft 6 in (5.64 m)
- Propulsion: 60,000 shp (45,000 kW); Westinghouse turbines; 2 screws
- Speed: 34 knots (63 km/h; 39 mph)
- Range: 6,500 nmi (12,000 km; 7,500 mi)
- Complement: 367 officers and enlisted
- Sensors & processing systems: SQS-23 Sonar System; SPS-10 Surface Search Radar; SPS-29 Air Search Radar
- Armament: As built: 6 × 5-inch (127 mm) guns, 12 × 40 mm AA guns, 11 × 20 mm AA guns, 10 × 21-inch (533 mm) torpedo tubes, 6 × K-gun depth charge projectors, 2 × depth charge tracks; Post-FRAM: 4 × 5-inch (127 mm) guns, 1 × Mk 112 ASROC launcher; 6 × Mk 32 torpedo tubes
- Aircraft carried: 2 × QH-50C DASH Drone Helicopters
- Notes: All specifications are post-FRAM except as noted

USS Leary (DD/DDR-879) (radio call sign: "Home Run"), one of the longest-lasting Gearing-class destroyers, was the second ship of the United States Navy to be named for Lieutenant Clarence F. Leary USNRF (1894–1918), who lost his life in the line of duty. He was posthumously awarded the Navy Cross.

== Construction and career ==
=== Commissioning and deployment ===
Leary's keel was laid down by the Consolidated Steel Corporation at Orange, Texas on 11 August 1944. The ship was launched on 20 January 1945 and was christened by Mrs. Theodore S. Wilkinson, wife of Vice Admiral Theodore S. Wilkinson. Leary was commissioned by the United States Navy on 7 May 1945. On 23 June 1945 Leary completed her shakedown off the US Naval base at Guantanamo Bay, Cuba and proceeded to her home port of Norfolk, Virginia.

In 1945 the Navy began converting 24 out of the 98 Gearings to radar picket ships (designated DDR in 1949) that could provide early warning of massed attack without overwhelming their Combat Information Centers. Leary was overhauled to upgrade her to a radar picket destroyer, which included installing the most advanced radar systems at the time. She then departed for Boston, Massachusetts where some fire control work was done. This work was interrupted by V-J Day celebrations. Later, the ship steamed to Casco Bay, Maine where she operated with a task force to assigned to develop defenses against kamikaze attacks.

Upon completion, the destroyer returned to Boston Navy Yard again where the ship was painted to participate in a Presidential Review of the Fleet in New York City on Navy Day 1945. After the Presidential review, she returned to Norfolk and joined DESRON 1. While there, she picked up some army troops. The squadron proceeded through the Panama Canal and docked at San Diego, where the army troops disembarked. Soon after, she proceeded to Pearl Harbor, then on to Yokosuka.

=== Occupation of Japan ===
After Christmas at Yokosuka the squadron broke up into destroyer divisions for occupation duty. Leary's division, Task Force 69 (TF 69), was composed of the Gearing-class destroyers USS Vesole, Dyess, and Bordelon. The division reported off the coast of Kure. After a few months, the division went back up towards Yokosuka. During exercises the faceplate on the MT 51 caved in, requiring a stay in Yokosuka for repairs. The rest of the division departed for Guam, with Leary joining them later after repairs were complete.

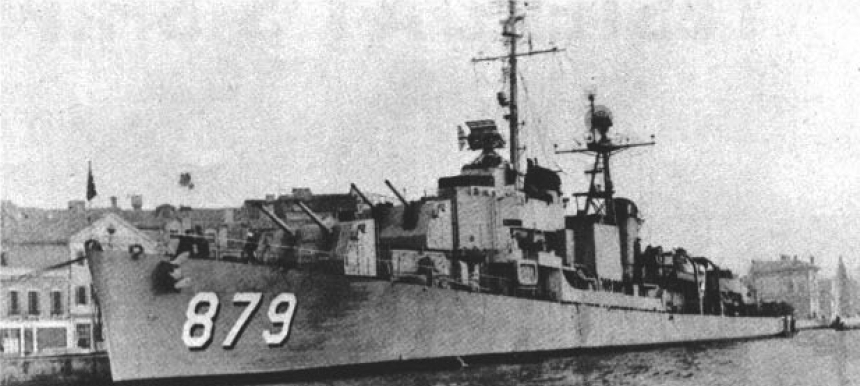
Leary in Venice, 1949.

Once in Guam, she joined the WESPAC Strike Force, Task Force 77, consisting of the aircraft carriers USS Bunker Hill and Antietam, the heavy cruiser Boston, the light cruisers Topeka and Duluth, and the rest of the destroyer division which included the Blue and three other destroyers. The task force usually operated out of Saipan, and occasionally out of Apra Harbor, Guam.

During this time, her division escorted the carriers to Hong Kong. After the rest of the task force joined up, they steamed to Qingdao, China, with an overnight stay in Buckner Bay, Okinawa. During that stay the cruisers and destroyers carried liberty parties (sailors on leave) from the carriers to Shanghai. The voyage home began at Qingdao on 4 June 1946, with operations and stops en route. Leary moored at San Diego on 21 December 1946. She departed early January 1947 and later transited the Panama Canal to return to Norfolk and then Newport, Rhode Island before beginning East Coast operations.

Leary's first Mediterranean deployment began in October 1945. Departing Newport on 29 October, Leary joined the U.S. 6th Fleet and made visits to ports in Algeria, Greece, Italy, and the island of Rhodes. She returned home on 14 February 1948. These missions were Leary's routine in succeeding years. In 1949, Leary's official designation was changed from DD-879 to DDR-879 to reflect her status as a radar picket destroyer. With the exception of 1957, Leary spent most of her time on active duty with the 6th Fleet, including the Suez Crisis of 1956, and the Lebanon landings of 1958.

=== Cuban Missile Crisis ===
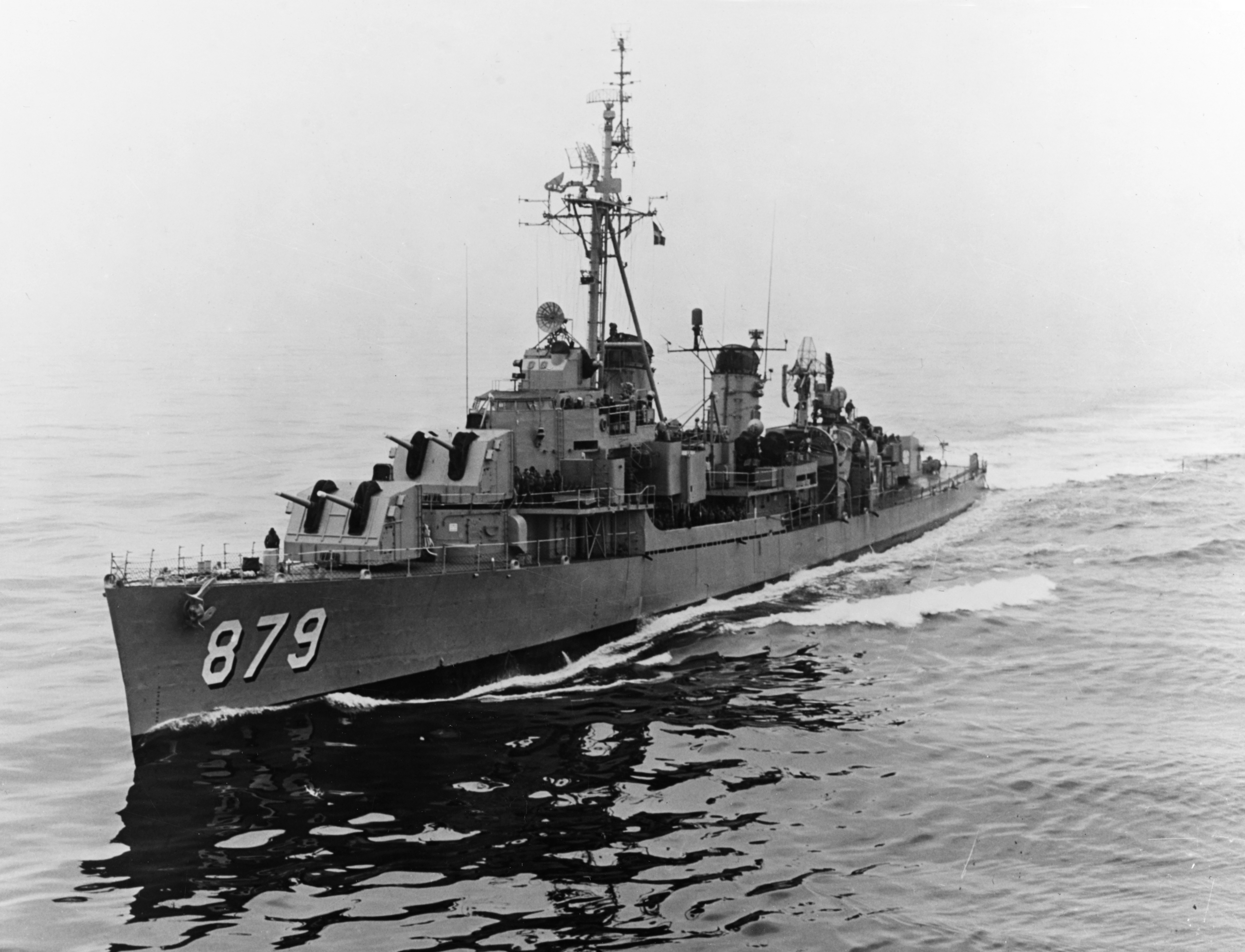
USS Leary in the early 1960s.

On 22 October 1962, the crew of Leary listened to President John F. Kennedy declare a quarantine of the island of Cuba in what became known as the Cuban Missile Crisis. She was immediately paired with the US flagship for the quarantine, the heavy cruiser Newport News. Leary's orders were to enforce the quarantine and assist Newport News in the missile count. From 22 October to 24 November 1962, Leary was continuously active in the US Navy blockade.

Tensions were running high when on 9 November, Leary and Newport News were operating in the waters northeast of Cuba. Suddenly, one of the first Soviet vessels, Labinsk, was detected by Leary's advanced radar as it approached the Navy blockade. Three minutes later, Leary, along with Newport News, surprised the Soviet vessel and quickly intercepted it. While Leary trained her heavy guns on Labinsk, Newport News went alongside and ordered the Soviet vessel to halt. Two Soviet ICBM missiles, without any payloads, were discovered on the deck of Labinsk.

After the missiles were inspected and photographed, the Soviet ship was permitted to turn around and steam away due east from Cuba, with Leary trailing close behind. 21 minutes later when Labinsk was safely away from Cuba, Leary radioed a warning to Labinsk not to return to Cuban waters. Leary then discontinued the trail and returned to the waters around Cuba to resume her patrol line in the picket.

Individual details on Leary's intercept from the US Navy, times are Romeo (UTC -5 hours):

- 090300R Leary and Newport News assigned to intercept the Soviet ship Labinsk
- 090615R Intercept made.
- 090730R Outer covers on missiles removed.
- 090748R Request to remove inner cover ignored.
- 090854R Deck cargo reported by Newport News as 2 missiles without nose cones. Outer cover removed for 1/3 of length from after end.
- 091100R 090836 posit 22-55N, 72-31W reported by CTG 136.2 Photos obtained
- 091113R Leary trailing.
- 091134R Leary discontinued trail. Labinsk proceeding

On 24 November President Kennedy declared the quarantine successful, and ordered the quarantine line disbanded after the Soviet MRBM's were dismantled and removed from Cuba. Leary and Newport News arrived in Norfolk the day before Thanksgiving, having successfully completed their mission.

=== Refit and Vietnam War ===
The ship underwent an extensive Fleet Rehabilitation and Modernization I (FRAM I) overhaul between April 1964 and January 1965. This removed her DDR radars, and Leary was redesignated as DD-879 again on 1 July 1964.

Between 24 April 1965, and 3 September 1965, she served on a peacekeeping mission off Santo Domingo as American troops were landed to prevent political chaos and subversion.

Leary saw active combat duty during the war in the Vietnam War. The standard rotation for destroyers was a few months combat tour of duty at sea, usually around five months. At the conclusion of her tour of duty, the destroyer would return to port for maintenance, usually her home port. While in port the crew would receive leave and go ashore. When maintenance was complete, the crew would return from leave and the ship would spend a period of time undergoing tests or exercises near port. When exercises were finished, the ship would receive their orders and then return to sea for a new tour of duty. This was Leary's routine for her entire operational life.

She was among the destroyers that protected aircraft from the carriers on Yankee Station in the Tonkin Gulf. During periods of sustained air operations against North Vietnam Leary, along with the other destroyers on patrol, were responsible for providing protective cover for as many as three aircraft carriers at once. This included firing her guns and destroying missile placements in North Vietnam that were firing at the fleet. Her guns were often fired during naval gunfire support missions. Leary was also regularly called upon to provide emergency search and rescue duties, and was responsible for saving the lives of many who would otherwise have been lost at sea.

Leary was rotated out of combat in late 1965, and at the conclusion of her tour of duty, returned to her home port in Norfolk for routine maintenance. Afterwards, the destroyer participated in extensive antisubmarine warfare exercises off the coast of North Carolina and Puerto Rico. She then returned to Norfolk on 16 December 1965.

Following another month of operations, she once again readied for deployment. Leary departed Norfolk on 4 March 1966 for a five-month tour of duty in the Mediterranean on patrol with the 6th Fleet. Afterwards, Leary returned to Norfolk on 12 August 1966 for a month of leave and regular maintenance. The remainder of the year was spent conducting local exercises, including an extensive evaluation of her two advanced QH-50 DASH helicopter drones.

From 3 to 17 March 1967, Leary briefly served as a Sonar School Ship at Key West, Florida. On 5 July Leary once again passed through the Panama Canal and was quickly en route to an extended tour of duty off the coast of Vietnam. She was accompanied by the destroyers Cony, Waldron, and Damato. On arrival, she was immediately assigned to provide needed gunfire support off the Vietnamese coast as she alternated duty with the carriers on Yankee Station. Periodically, Leary reinforced the 7th Fleet cruisers and she provided naval gunfire support to allied forces in South Vietnam. On 9 October Leary operated on Baie de Ganh Rai of the Mekong River Delta in South Vietnam.

In 1967 Leary was active in Operation Sea Dragon and was responsible for using her guns to destroy land targets, as well as interdict sea lines of communication between North and South Vietnam. Steaming generally in pairs, the two to four American and Australian destroyers and one cruiser worked with carrier-based spotter planes, such as the Douglas A-1 Skyraider and Grumman S-2 Tracker, to find, identify, and destroy infiltrating vessels and shore targets. The destroyers took heavy fire from North Vietnamese coastal batteries, and Leary would immediately return fire. Although it was reported that life aboard Sea Dragon destroyers proved stressful and tiring, morale consistently remained high because of the operation's effectiveness. While several ships were hit, no U.S. or Australian vessel was sunk during the two-year-long Sea Dragon operation and Leary remained undamaged. Leary remained active in Sea Dragon until the end of October 1968.

Then in January 1969 Leary again passed through the Panama Canal and was deployed for duty with the 7th Fleet providing gunfire support to U.S. operations in Vietnam until October 1969, after which she returned to her home port in Norfolk.

=== Return home and longevity ===
From January through October 1969 Leary made a Western Pacific cruise for extended deployment with the 7th Fleet providing gun fire support to US operations in Vietnam.

On 5 November, the 632-foot (193 m) Liberian tanker Keo broke in half about 30 miles (48 km) east of Cape May, New Jersey. First reports were that 36 crewmen were safe on the stern section of the ship. Leary was immediately dispatched to the scene, along with two United States Coast Guard cutters, two C-130 aircraft, the destroyer Hugh Purvis, and the cruiser Fox. However, before any of the ships or the aircraft arrived, the stern quickly sank, and all 36 crewmen were lost.

From May through October 1970 Leary performed a Mediterranean cruise and from December 1971 to June 1972 the destroyer made another Mediterranean cruise which would be her final major cruise before conducting operations off the East Coast, which continued to her decommissioning on 31 October 1973. Leary returned one last time to Norfolk, and on 31 October 1973, stood-to for her decommissioning ceremony as she was recognized for her 28 years of distinguished and honorable service to the United States Navy. USS Leary DD/DDR-879 was recognized as one of the longest serving Gearing-class destroyers in the Navy.

Leary was carefully examined for weapons effects testing, and provided vital information on structural integrity and survivability which assisted in the design and planning of later destroyers. After the tests were completed, she was transferred to the inactive fleet and stricken from the U.S. Naval Vessel Register on 2 June 1975.

=== Transfer to Spain ===
In 1978 Spain ratified a new constitution, and was now a newly free democratic state. The United States had pledged the new government their support. On 17 May 1978, Leary once again took to the sea and was loaned to Spain to aid in the transition of the new Spanish democracy. She was renamed Langara (D64) in the Spanish Navy.

She was part of Spain's battle to suppress piracy and smuggling, which were very serious threats from opponents of the new free Spanish government. After Spain joined NATO, the destroyer found herself once again serving alongside other United States naval vessels. Langara spent the next fourteen years serving with NATO and insuring the survival of the new Spanish democracy until the effects of age overcame the ship. In 1992, she was stricken and broken up for scrap by Spain after a marathon 47 years of service on the Earth's oceans, having protected two democracies and visited every sea at least once.
