= James E. Kyes =

James Elsworth Kyes
- Born: April 16, 1906; Everett, Washington
- Died: December 24, 1943; North Atlantic
- Military career
- Allegiance: United States of America
- Branch: United States Navy
- Service years: 1926–1943
- Rank: Commander
- Commands: USS Leary (DD-158)
- Conflicts: World War II; *Battle of the Atlantic
- Awards: Navy Cross (posthumous)

James Elsworth Kyes (April 16, 1906 – 1943) was an American naval officer.

Born in Everett, Washington, Kyes graduated from the United States Naval Academy in 1930. As commanding officer of USS Leary (DD-158), Commander Kyes was awarded the Navy Cross posthumously for "extraordinary heroism" during action against German submarines in the North Atlantic 23 December 1943. At 1:58-AM, 24 December, after his ship had received three torpedo hits and was sinking, he gave the order to abandon ship. As he prepared to leave Leary, he checked to see that none of his men remained on board and spied a kitchen mess boy whose life jacket was torn and useless. Commander Kyes removed his own jacket and handed it to the boy. He then calmly climbed over the side and was swallowed up by the waters of the cold Atlantic, gallantly sacrificing his own life to protect a young member of his crew. There is a memorial to him in the ghost town of Monte Cristo where his home burned down in 1944. The Kyes home was the Monte Cristo Hotel, which Kyes' father ran. Nearby Kyes Peak, first climbed by Kyes as a young Eagle Scout, is also named after him.

== Legacy ==
In 1945, the destroyer USS James E. Kyes (DD-787) was named in his honor.

Goblin Peak in the Cascade Mountains was renamed Kyes Peak shortly after the war in commemoration of the Commander's actions. Kyes was a member of the first climbing party to summit the peak, and brought down a sapling from the peak which he then planted in the now-abandoned town of Monte Cristo, Washington. The tree still grows today alongside a plaque and a letter describing the action of December 23.
