= USS James E. Kyes =

Gearing-class destroyer

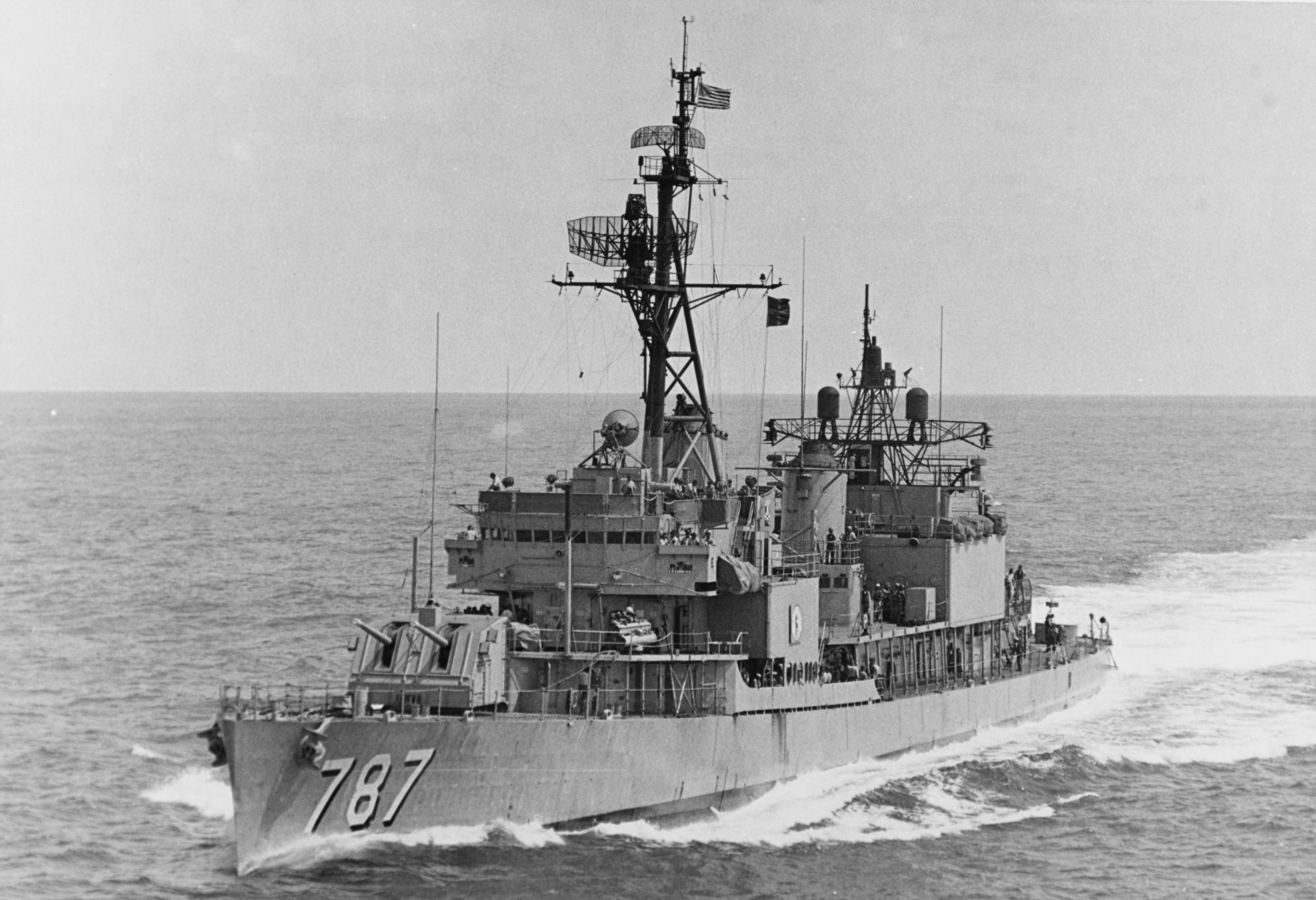
- USS James E. Kyes underway in November 1967

History

United States
- Name: James E. Kyes
- Namesake: James E. Kyes
- Builder: Todd Pacific Shipyards
- Laid down: 27 December 1944
- Launched: 4 August 1945
- Commissioned: 8 February 1946
- Modernized: 18 December 1962 (FRAM IB)
- Stricken: 31 March 1973
- Identification: Callsign: NTVZ; Hull number: DD-787
- Honors and awards: See Awards
- Fate: Transferred to Taiwan, 18 April 1973

Taiwan
- Name: Chien Yang; (建陽)
- Namesake: Chien Yang
- Acquired: 18 April 1973
- Commissioned: 18 April 1973
- Reclassified: DDG-912, 1980s
- Decommissioned: 1 December 2004
- Identification: Hull number: DD-912

General characteristics
- Class & type: Gearing-class destroyer
- Displacement: 3,460 long tons (3,516 t) full
- Length: 390 ft 6 in (119.02 m)
- Beam: 40 ft 10 in (12.45 m)
- Draft: 14 ft 4 in (4.37 m)
- Propulsion: Geared turbines, 2 shafts, 60,000 shp (45 MW)
- Speed: 35 knots (65 km/h; 40 mph)
- Range: 4,500 nmi (8,300 km) at 20 kn (37 km/h; 23 mph)
- Complement: 336
- Armament: 6 × 5"/38 caliber guns; 12 × 40 mm AA guns; 11 × 20 mm AA guns; 10 × 21 inch (533 mm) torpedo tubes; 6 × depth charge projectors; 2 × depth charge tracks

USS James E. Kyes (DD-787) was a Gearing-class destroyer of the United States Navy, named for Commander James E. Kyes (1906–1943).

== Construction and career ==
James E. Kyes was laid down on 27 December 1944 by Todd Pacific Shipyards, Inc., Seattle, Washington; launched on 4 August 1945; sponsored by Mrs. James E. Kyes; and commissioned on 8 February 1946.

=== Service in the United States Navy ===
After shakedown along the West Coast, James E. Kyes steamed from Seattle on 12 June for Pearl Harbor to embark troops for transportation to the United States. Arriving San Diego, California on 12 July, she operated along the California coast until departing on 9 November for the western Pacific. Joining the 7th Fleet at Shanghai on 30 November, she operated along the Chinese Coast supporting Chiang Kai-shek's struggle with the Chinese Communists for control of the mainland.

Departing Tsingtao, China, on 28 January 1947, she steamed to Japan for four months of operations off southeastern Japan, in the Tsushima Strait, and along the Korean coast. She cleared Yokosuka on 8 June for home and arrived San Diego on 22 June.

Following operations out of San Diego and San Francisco, California, and Bremerton, Washington, she departed San Pedro, Los Angeles, 2 September 1948 for duty in the Far East. Arriving Yokosuka, Japan, on 30 September, she conducted surveillance patrols in the East China Sea and the Tsushima Strait.

She steamed to Inchon, Korea, on 20 January 1949 as tensions mounted on that peninsula. Returning to Japan on 28 January, she resumed sea patrols until departing Yokosuka on 3 April for San Diego.

==== Korean War ====
After arrival on 24 April, James E. Kyes operated out of San Diego until sailing for the western Pacific on 23 June 1950, two days before North Korean troops crossed the 38th parallel to sweep down through South Korea. Ordered by President Harry S. Truman to give South Korean troops "cover and support," the Navy placed the 7th Fleet on alert from Formosa to Japan. Standing off Pohang-dong, Korea, on 18 July, Kyes provided fire support during landing operations which reinforced U.N. positions at the southern end of the peninsula. She joined Doyle (DMS-34) on 2 August escorting Sicily (CVE-118) while that carrier's aircraft struck enemy troop and supply concentrations along Korea's southern and western coasts. Sailing into the Sea of Japan on 11 August, she screened Badoeng Strait (CVE-116), Valley Forge (CV-45), and Philippine Sea (CV-47); and then steamed to Sasebo, Japan on 27 August to prepare for Operation Chromite.

As a flanking counterstroke to halt the North Korean advance, General Douglas MacArthur ordered an amphibious assault against Inchon to be carried out on 15 September. James E. Kyes arrived off Inchon the 15th to guard Boxer (CV-21) as her aircraft conducted preinvasion strikes. Remaining off Inchon until 3 October, the destroyer sailed via Sasebo to Korea's east coast for patrol duty.

Late in November she sailed for the United States; but, ordered to reverse course on the 29th, she steamed back to the fight. The Chinese People's Liberation Army had crossed the Yalu River into North Korea to attack advancing U.N. forces. The Chinese cut off and surrounded the 5th and 7th Marine Regiments at Chosin Reservoir on 27 November. The releasing of the marines depended upon air cover from the aircraft carriers stationed off the eastern coast. James E. Kyes joined the task force on 1 December and provided anti-submarine warfare (ASW) support while aircraft made hundreds of sorties supporting the embattled marines. Under a protective canopy of naval air cover, the leathernecks broke through on 10 December at Chinhung-ni and moved to Hŭngnam for evacuation. James E. Kyes remained on guard as the Navy completed the Hungnam withdrawal of 24 December after embarking 105,000 troops, 91,000 refugees and vast quantities of military cargo. She remained along the eastern coast, supporting the southward movement of American forces. Sailing for home on 19 January 1951, she arrived San Diego on 8 February.

James E. Kyes departed San Diego on 27 August and joined Boxer (CV-21) and Bon Homme Richard (CV-31) on 20 September in patrolling the Sea of Japan. Sailing to Formosa on 17 December, she joined the Formosa Strait surveillance patrols before resuming carrier guard duty off Korea on 22 January 1952. Kyes joined the U.N. Blockading and Escort Force on 19 February and sailed to the Wonsan area to conduct "harassing and interdiction fire at predesignated targets and targets of opportunity." Designed to prevent or hinder enemy troop and supply movements, her patrol concentrated on enemy shore batteries, coastal roads, and railroad installations before sailing for home on 25 March.

Departing San Francisco on 12 November, James E. Kyes resumed Korean blockade and bombardment duty on 5 December and joined the Formosa Patrol during February 1953. She returned to Korea on 14 March. Blockade and bombardment patrols were often unspectacular, but therein lay the effectiveness of the naval blockade. As Rear Admiral Sir W. G. Andrewes, RN, observed, "The absence of the spectacular is a measure of the complete success achieved." Patrolling Korea's eastern coast for almost three months, Kyes engaged enemy batteries, covered amphibious landings, and supported carrier air strikes. On 19 May James E. Kyes and Eversole became members of the "Train Busters Club", the awards issued by Commander of TF 95, for destroying a Communist supply train. Illuminating the area with 128 star shells, the two destroyers pumped 418 rounds of 5-inch shells into multiple trains.

Ordered home on 9 June via Yokosuka and Midway, she arrived at Long Beach, California on 29 June.

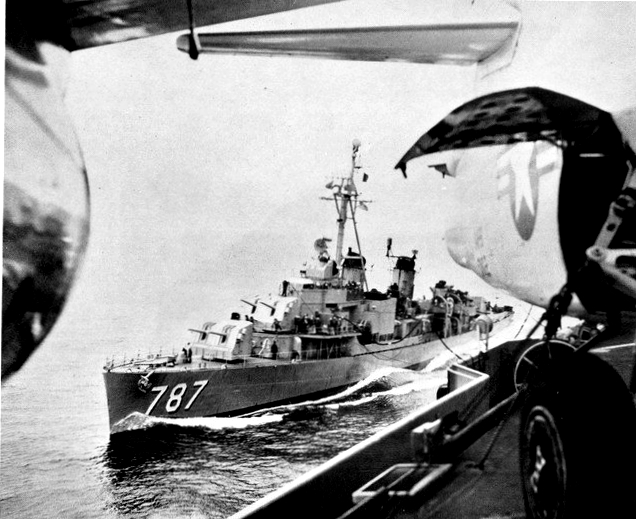
James E. Kyes refueling from USS Midway (CVA-41), 1958

From 9 February 1954 to 12 March 1962, James E. Kyes deployed to the Far East on seven occasions. While operating with the 7th Fleet, she ranged the Orient from Japan and Korea to Southeast Asia and Australia and engaged in a variety of activities.

==== Operation Passage to Freedom ====
She patrolled the coasts of Korea, where an uneasy truce had brought an end to hostilities in July 1953. On several occasions she joined the Formosa Patrol to protect the Chinese Nationalists from Communist invasions. In 1955 she sailed to Southeast Asia while the Navy carried thousands of refugees from North to South Vietnam during "Operation Passage to Freedom".

While serving in the Pacific, James E. Kyes conducted several air-sea rescue missions. During the Marshall Islands' nuclear tests of 1956, she acted as a life guard ship; and, in May 1959, she steamed from duty in the Formosa Strait to assist and guard SS President Hayes, grounded in the Paracel Islands off Vietnam. She also served as plane guard during carrier flight operations, and on four occasions during 1960 and 1961 she effected or assisted in successful rescues of downed pilots and flight crews.

While deployed with the Fleet, James E. Kyes engaged in numerous operations designed to test and improve her performance as a fighting ship. In December 1961, during her longest deployment to the Far East, she participated in a combined ASW readiness exercise with units of the Japanese Maritime Self-Defense Force, which "greatly advanced the mutual understanding between the two forces."

After returning to the West Coast on 12 March 1962, James E. Kyes assumed an "in-commission-in-reserve" status on 16 April and underwent Fleet Rehabilitation and Modernization (FRAM I) conversion at Puget Sound Naval Shipyard, Bremerton, Washington, to prepare for her role in the new Navy. Returning to full commission on 18 December, she participated in fleet exercises held off the California coast on 27 and 28 May 1963 in honor of President John F. Kennedy.

James E. Kyes deployed to the Far East on 10 October. Following readiness evaluation exercises off the Hawaiian Islands, she arrived Yokosuka, Japan, on 22 November and commenced Fleet operations that continued to the end of the year. In the spring of 1964 she participated in Operation "Back Packs," a combined Chinese Nationalist and United States amphibious exercise on Taiwan. She was in the hunter-killer group which provided ASW protection for the operation. During the deployment, she supplied water to Hong Kong helping to relieve suffering caused by a severe drought which afflicted the city.

The destroyer returned to Long Beach on 2 April 1964 and operated out of homeport for the rest of the year. She celebrated Columbus Day by saving a wayward DASH helicopter from hitting Eversole (DD-789). She sailed for the Far East on 24 March 1965 and reached Yokosuka on 30 April. In May she participated in SEATO Exercise "Seahorse" with ships of the Thai, United Kingdom, and Australian navies. At the end of this exercise in the South China Sea, she visited Bangkok, Thailand. After upkeep in Subic Bay and a run to Hong Kong, James E. Kyes got underway for Exercise "Cross Tee II" in the Sea of Japan with ships of the Japanese Maritime Self-Defense Force.

==== Vietnam War ====
During her 14th Westpac deployment in July 1965, James E. Kyes reported for duty with TF 77, which she operated until 10 September. During this period James E. Kyes served as plane guard for USS Bennington, AAW and SSSC picket at the southern end of the Tonkin Gulf and carried out a mercy mission to a stranded South Vietnamese SeaBee Battalion on Drummon Island in the Paracel Islands group, providing them with food and water. From 30 August to 5 September, the ship fired her guns in anger for the first time since the Korean War, providing illuminations and destructive fire near the Quảng Ngãi Province area of South Vietnam while assigned as Naval Gunfire Support (NGFS) ship.

From 2 to 7 August 1966, James E. Kyes was assigned as NGFS ship off South Vietnam. The ship returned to the Tonkin Gulf for operations. From 10 October to 24 November, James E. Kyes served as Surface-Subsurface Coordinator, and double as support for the USS Chicago on PIRAZ station from 25 October to 2 November. Between 8 and 15 November, James E. Kyes was again assigned duties as NGFS ship and expended 787 round of 5-inch projectiles against the enemy during this seven-day period.

19 August 1967 marked the beginning of James E. Kyes 16th Westpac deployment. From 24 to 28 October James E. Kyes was attached to Task Unit 70.9.9 as a gunfire support ship off the I Corps area of South Vietnam and the DMZ. From 29 October to 5 November 1967, she was part of TU 77.1.1 on Operation Sea Dragon. James E. Kyes ran support for the Cruisers USS Newport News and USS Canberra during this time and helped destroy North Vietnamese bridges, roads, and coastal gun sites, and disrupted logistics traffic headed south for use by North Vietnamese and Viet Cong troops in South Vietnam. On 30 October James E. Kyes was fired upon by a North Vietnamese gun emplacement on an island. The North Vietnamese fired 27 rounds at James E. Kyes, evasive action avoided damage and USS Canberra subsequently destroyed the gun emplacement. James E. Kyes and crew received the combat action medal for the above incident. From 6 to 11 November, James E. Kyes was once more assigned to TW 70.8.9 off South Vietnam's I Corps area. During this period, James E. Kyes was one of the destroyers cited by the Admiral in charge of Amphibious Operations (KNOX and FORMATION LEADER), for extremely effective gunfire missions conduction "promptly and in a highly efficient manner". Leaving the gun line on 11 November, James E. Kyes had fired almost 3000 rounds of 5-inch ammunition against targets in both North and South Vietnam, and had destroyed or damaged 124 military structures, 300 meters of trenches and bunkers, 6 sampans, and a number of North Vietnamese coastal gun sites.

On 3 January 1968, the James E. Kyes was again underway for the Tonkin Gulf with Task Force 77. Between 19 August 1967 and the middle of January 1968, the James E. Kyes spent every month receiving combat pay for being in the waters off the coast of Vietnam. With only a couple of brief "R&R" stops for replenishment of food and arms, this was the longest stay in the combat zone. Because of this the crew were granted R&R in Australia and were steaming south for several days ( 20–23 January). When the USS Pueblo was captured by North Korean forces on 23 January 1968, James E. Kyes was ordered to head to the Sea of Japan to assist other ships of the 7th Fleet with taking back the Pueblo as part of Operation Formation Star. At Flank speed James E. Kyes headed away from Australia and toward the Sea of Japan. Upon arrival in the Sea of Japan James E. Kyes met two aircraft carriers, the USS Enterprise and USS Kearsarge and each of their escorts of a cruiser and several more destroyers. The James E. Kyes was the "Flagship" of the destroyer fleet because the Captain was on board. Because of this and its armament, James E. Kyes was assigned to be the "Tow Ship" to bring the Pueblo out of Wonson Harbor. James E. Kyes maintained position as the closest ship to the Pueblo and crew mates could see the Pueblo through their binoculars. For several weeks James E. Kyes sat like a buoy bouncing in the just-under hurricane weather at −40 degrees temperatures.

On 29 March 1969, James E. Kyes was underway for her 17th Westpac deployment, her 4th tour to Vietnam waters, and her 7th tour to the Vietnam gunline. Arriving early in the morning of 19 June, in the vicinity of Vũng Tàu, near the Mekong River Delta, the ship was at a tense General Quarters ready for anything. This soon relaxed after her first firing mission in support of Australian forces against VC base camps in a valley 16 miles east-northeast of Vũng Tàu. James E. Kyes then moved south into and up the Saigon River, fired several missions.

On 22 May, James E. Kyes transited to Manila Bay, Republic of the Philippines, where she joined in preparations for the joint SEATO exercise "Sea Spirit". On 26 May, Philippine President Ferdinand Marcos opened the exercise at a ceremony in Manila. James E. Kyes steamed in company with HMS Cleopatra and operated with the elements of ASW Group 1, Destroyer Squadron 23 and various SEATO units including HMAS Melbourne. James E. Kyes continued screen duties, ASW and AAW alertness for four days. Following the Melbourne–Evans collision on 3 June 1969 James E. Kyes assisted in the rescue of survivors from the Frank E. Evans (DD-754). James E. Kyes departed the collision area with ASW Group 1 en route Subic Bay, and on 6 June tied up to Riviera Pier for an upkeep period and pre-gun line replenishment. By 17 June, preparation was completed and James E. Kyes departed Subic Bay en route to the gun line, off the coast of III Corp, Republic of Vietnam.

On 23 June, James E. Kyes hit enemy position 15 miles north of Qui Nhơn, destroying six military structures, damaging nine and destroyed an ammunition dump. From the 24th to the 26th, James E. Kyes fired several missions destroying enemy bunkers, structures and supply camps. On the 27th, the ship's batteries came to the aid of the 47th South Vietnamese Regiment during a Viet Cong attack seven miles northwest of Tuy Hòa in II Corps. Illumination rounds fired by the ship helped the friendly forces repel the VC. In addition, missions fired at enemy targets six and nine miles northwest of Tuy Hòa, destroyed ten Viet Cong bunkers. On the 28th and 29th, the ship fired in support of the Ninth ROK Infantry Division. 1 July, James E. Kyes was off Phan Thiết supporting units of the 506th Infantry Regiment.

During the gun line period, James E. Kyes supported American, Australian, South Korean and South Vietnamese troops fighting ashore. The ship was responsible for destroying 41 bunkers, 4 caves, 29 military structures and causing five secondary explosions, of which one was an ammo dump. James E. Kyes was diverted to Korean waters in October 1969 when the North Koreans shot down an American reconnaissance plane while in international air space. After several periods at sea in the Tonkin Gulf, James E. Kyes was detached and arrived in Long Beach on 21 November 1969.

The year 1970 marked the first time since 1946 that James E. Kyes did not deploy to the Western Pacific. However, she operated up and down the West Coast with many exercises after a Hull renovation from March to June. Completing Refresher Training and Naval Gunfire Support Qualifications, James E. Kyes was ready for its 1971 deployment.

In 1971, James E. Kyes after several important exercises between Long Beach and Pearl Harbor, got under way for the Western Pacific on 19 March. Arriving in the Gulf of Tonkin and Vietnamese waters on 3 April, James E. Kyes plane guarded for the USS Hancock and steamed with the USS Ranger. On 11 May 1971, the ship again arrived in the Gulf and plane guarded for the USS Ticonderoga.

After an exercise with ships from the Japanese Maritime Self Defense Force, the ship plane guarded for the USS Ticonderoga once again. However, this lasted only 2 days as James E. Kyes along with Destroyer Squadron 23 was detached on 17 June and ordered to Long Beach via Adak, Alaska for refueling. The James E. Kyes moored in Long Beach on 5 July ending a 3-month Westpac cruise. The James E. Kyes along with the rest of Desron 23, changed home ports on 1 September 1971 from Long Beach to San Diego, California due to the Navy's general administrative reorganization.

On 5 June 1972, James E. Kyes departed San Diego for her 21st and final Westpac deployment. On 6 June, James E. Kyes rendezvoused with USS Oriskany and escorted the carrier to the Gulf of Tonkin arrive on 22 June 1972. On 7 July, James E. Kyes began her first of several Naval Gunfire Support missions off South Vietnam. She also participated in Naval Gunfire Strikes off North Vietnam and still more firing missions of South Vietnam. In 1972, the ship spent 3-month in the war zone broken only by short upkeep and R&R periods in Subic Bay, Kaohsiung and Hong Kong.

On 26 December 1972, James E. Kyes in company with destroyers USS Shelton, USS Hoel and USS Gray departed Subic Bay for San Diego conducting extensive TYPE training exercises en route. James E. Kyes arrived in San Diego, California on 13 January 1973 thus ending her "Last at-sea period" as a commissioned United States Destroyer.

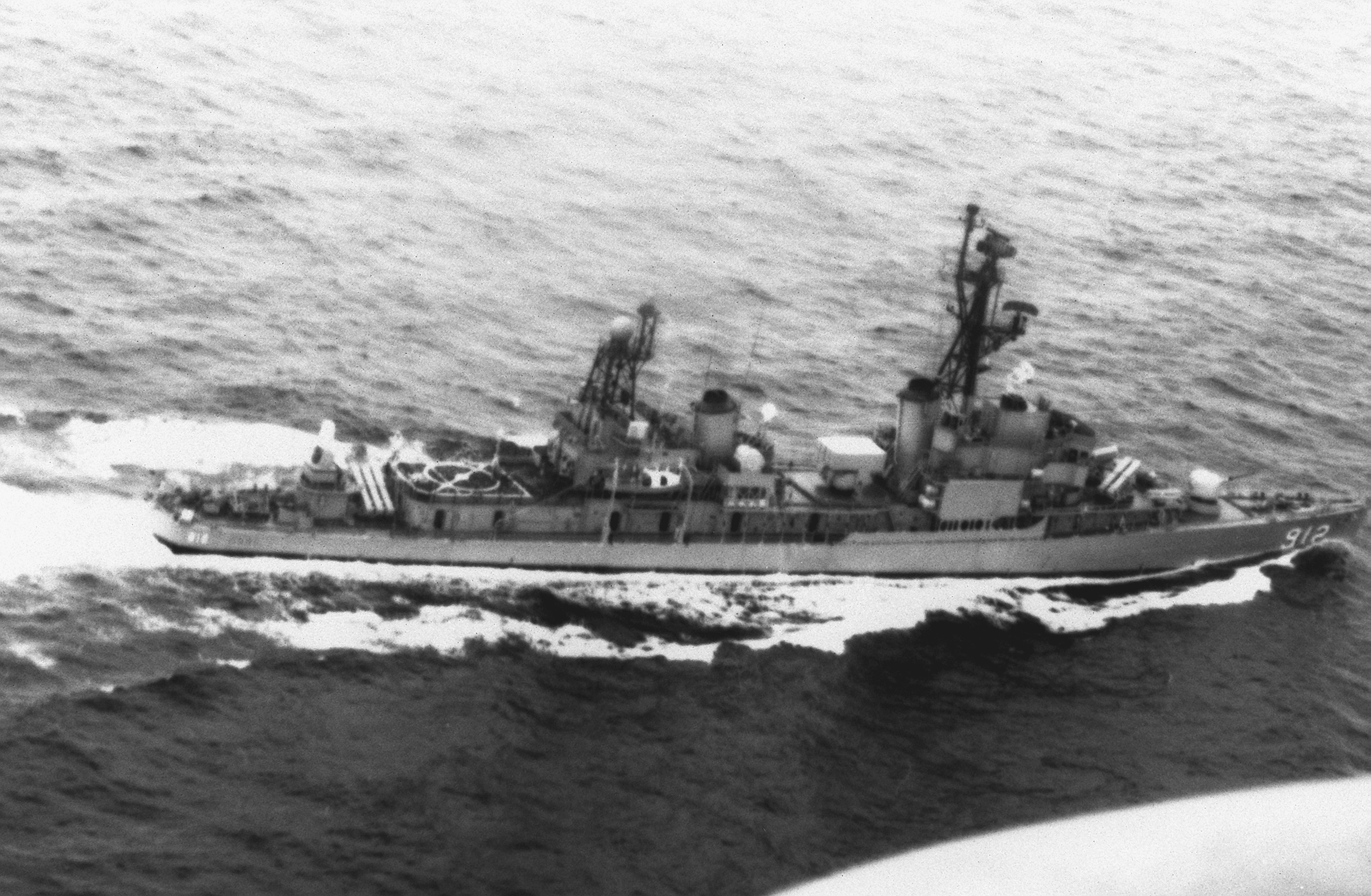
Chien Yang underway, date unknown

James E. Kyes made 7 deployments to the Western Pacific and 19 tours to the Vietnam War zone.

James E. Kyes was decommissioned, and on 31 March 1973 she was stricken from the Naval Vessel Register.

On 18 April 1973, the ship was transferred to the Republic of China.

=== Service in the Republic of China Navy ===
She served in the Republic of China Navy as ROCS Chien Yang (Chinese: 建陽艦),

She was reclassified as a guided missile destroyer DDG-912 after her 1980s Wu-Chin III modernization program.

Chien Yang was decommissioned 1 December 2004 at Tsoying Naval Base, Kaohsiung, Taiwan.

She was originally scheduled to be transferred to Taichung for display but was sold and dismantled in November 2013 without the intention of the local government.

== Awards ==
Combat Action Ribbon, China Service Medal, World War II Victory Medal, Navy Occupation Service Medal with Asia clasp, National Defense Service Medal (2nd award), Korea Service Medal with six battle stars, Armed Forces Expeditionary Medal (2nd award), Vietnam Service Medal with 7 campaign stars, Republic of Vietnam Cross of Gallantry, United Nations Korea Medal, Vietnam Campaign Medal with Clasp (60-).
