= 1992 U.S. Figure Skating Championships =

Figure skating competition

- Type: National Championship
- Date: January 4 – 12
- Season: 1991–92
- Location: Orlando, Florida
- Host: Orlando Arena

Champions
- Men's singles: Christopher Bowman
- Ladies' singles: Kristi Yamaguchi
- Pairs: Calla Urbanski / Rocky Marval
- Ice dance: April Sargent Thomas / Russ Witherby
- Previous: 1991 U.S. Championships
- Next: 1993 U.S. Championships

The 1992 U.S. Figure Skating Championships took place at the Orlando Arena in Orlando, Florida. Medals were awarded in four colors: gold (first), silver (second), bronze (third), and pewter (fourth) in six disciplines – men's singles, ladies' singles, pair skating, ice dancing, men's figures and ladies's figures – across three levels: senior, junior, and novice.

The event determined the U.S. teams for the 1992 Winter Olympics and 1992 World Championships.

== Senior results ==
=== Men ===
Rank	Name	SP	FS
1	Christopher Bowman	1	1
2	Paul Wylie	4	2
3	Mark Mitchell	2	3
4	Scott Davis	3	4
5	Aren Nielsen	6	5
6	Craig Heath	9	6
7	Michael Chack	5	9
8	Rudy Galindo	8	8
9	Shepherd Clark	11	7
10	Damon Allen	7	10
11	Erik Larson	10	11
12	Colin VanderVeen	13	12
13	Larry Holliday	12	13
14	Troy Goldstein	14	14
15	Alex Chang	17	15
16	Christopher Beck	15	16
17	Gig Siruno	16	17
18	Edmund Darey Nesti	18	18
19	Andre McGaughey	19	19

=== Men's figures ===
Rank	Name
1	Brian Schmidt
2	Gig Siruno
3	Troy Goldstein
4	Scott Cormier
5	Eric Hampton
6	David Delago
7	J. Robert Morris, Jr.
8	Vearle Klinger
9	Scott Tonidandel
10	Laurent Masse

=== Ladies ===
Rank	Name	SP	FS
1	Kristi Yamaguchi	1	1
2	Nancy Kerrigan	2	2
3	Tonya Harding	3	3
4	Lisa Ervin	5	4
5	Tonia Kwiatkowski	6	5
6	Tisha Walker	4	6
7	Nicole Janda	7	7
8	Kyoko Ina	9	8
9	Jennifer Itoh	11	9
10	Rosanna Tovi	10	10
11	Dena Galech	8	11
12	Robyn Petroskey	13	12
13	Tamara Kuchiki	14	13
14	Jessica Mills	12	15
15	Andrea Catoia	18	14
16	Leana Naczynski	15	16
17	Cindy Caraos	16	18
18	Dana McDonald	19	17
19	Julie Shott	17	19
20	Renee Dittmer	20	20
21	Sarah Gendreau	21	21

=== Pairs ===
Rank	Name	SP	FS
1	Calla Urbanski / Rocky Marval	3	1
2	Jenni Meno / Scott Wendland	2	2
3	Natasha Kuchiki / Todd Sand	1	3
4	Karen Courtland / Todd Reynolds	4	4
5	Tristen Vega / Richard Alexander	6	5
6	Laura Murphy / Brian Wells	7	6
7	Kyoko Ina / Jason Dungjen	9	7
8	Jennifer Heurlin / John Fredericksen	5	9
9	Sharon Carz / John Denton	8	8
10	Susan Purdy / Scott Chiamulera	11	10
11	Katie Wood / Joel McKeever	10	11
12	Tracey Damigella / Doug Williams	12	12
13	Dawn Goldstein / Troy Goldstein	14	13
14	Cambria Goodman / Steven Moore	13	14
15	Kara Paxton / Brad Cox	16	15
16	Kristy Bingham / Carmine Marinari	15	16

=== Ice dancing ===
Rank	Name	CD1	CD2	OD	FD
1	April Sargent Thomas / Russ Witherby	2	1	1	1
2	Rachel Mayer / Peter Breen	1	2	3	2
3	Elizabeth Punsalan / Jerod Swallow	4	3	2	4
4	Jeanne Miley / Michael Verlich	5	5	4	3
5	Amy Webster / Leif Erickson	3	4	5	5
6	Elizabeth McLean / Ron Kravette	6	6	6	6
7	Mimi Wacholder / Collin Sullivan	9	9	7	7
8	Elisa Curtis / Robert Nardozza	7	7	8	8
9	Elizabeth Buhl / Neale Smull	8	8	9	10
10	Wendy Millette / Jason Tebo	10	10	10	9
11	Kimberly Callahan / Jonathan Stine	11	11	11	11
12	Galit Chait / Maxim Sevostianov	13	13	13	12
13	Ann-Morton Neale / Robert Peal	12	12	12	13
14	Dawn Goldstein / Troy Goldstein	14	15	15	14
15	Kimbra Baurer / Laurence Shaffer	15	14	14	15

== Junior results ==
=== Men ===
Rank	Name	SP	FS
1	Ryan Hunka	1	1
2	Daniel Hollander	3	2
3	John Baldwin Jr.	2	3
4	John Bevan	4	4
5	Michael Weiss	5	5
6	Clifford Retamar	8	6
7	Eric Bohnstedt	6	7
8	Jeff Merica	9	8
9	Phillip Dulebohn	7	9
10	Chris Hendricks	11	10
11	Curtis Socha	10	11
12	Russ Scott	13	12
13	Lance Travis	12	13
14	Thomas Icantalupo	14	14

=== Men's figures ===
Rank	Name
1	Jay Cochon
2	Mark Drouillard
3	Jeffrey Adler
4	Eddie Gornik
5	Eric Bohnstedt
6	Shaun Ditmar
7	Erik Rockwell
8	John Wright
9	Anand Bodke
10	Sloane Yeh
11	Fred Palascak

=== Ladies ===
Rank	Name	SP	FS
1	Caroline Song	1	1
2	Laura Cazel	2	2
3	Lefki Terzakis	3	3
4	Teresa Aiello	6	5
5	Amanda Farkas	4	7
6	Tanya Street	11	4
7	Keri Anne Thomas	7	6
8	Jennifer Verili	3	8
9	Michelle Kwan	5	9
10	Jaclyn Ward	9	11
11	Bridgit Ryan	12	10
12	Dawn Finley	8	13
13	Shirl Catani	14	12
WD	Nicole Laurin	10	

=== Ladies' figures ===
Rank	Name
1	Jessica Posada
2	Jennifer Carlson
3	Kristin Knotts
4	Sarah Brock
5	Bethany Quintin
6	Dawn Jensen
7	Beth Allen
8	Desiree V. Toneatto
9	Heidi Green
10	Leah Hardy
11	Jenna DuMond
12	Sonja Castaneda

=== Pairs ===
Rank	Name	SP	FS
1	Nicole Sciarrotta / Gregor Sciarrotta	1	1
2	Dawn Piepenbrink / Nick Castaneda	2	2
3	Robin Heckler / Jeff Tilley	3	4
4	Andrea Catoia / Paul Dulebohn	6	3
5	Ilyssa Lerner / Erik Schultz	4	5
6	Jacki Davison / Russ Scott	5	6
7	Victoria Cargas / Mel Chapman	9	7
8	Dana Mednick / Lance Travis	7	8
9	Cheryl Marker / Todd Price	7	9
10	Erin Covington / Brandon Powell	12	10
11	Heather Hughes / Scott Messmore	11	11
12	Jennifer Darst / Floyd Johnson	10	12
13	Deirdre McMahon / Ross McMahon	13	13

=== Ice dancing ===
Rank	Name	CD1	CD2	OD	FD
1	Christine Fowler / Garrett Swasey	3	3	1	1
2	Cheryl Demkowski / Sean Gales	1	1	2	3
3	Kimberley Hartley / Michael Sklutovsky	4	4	3	2
4	Rachel Lane / Tony Darnell	5	6	4	4
5	Christina Fitzgerald / Mark Fitzgerald	2	2	5	5
6	Melinda Sweezey / Gary Irving	8	9	6	6
7	Tiffani Tucker / Frank Singley	6	5	7	7
8	Melissa Boney / Gerald Miele	7	7	8	9
9	Jamie Coffey / Ben Williamson	10	10	9	8
10	Kaho Koinuma / Jeffrey Czarnecki	9	8	10	10
11	Nicole Dumonceaux / John Reppucci	11	12	11	11
12	Laura Gayton / Peter Abraham	12	11	12	12
13	Daniela Lopez / Andres Lopez	14	14	14	13
14	Samantha Liegner / Doug Murray	13	13	13	14

== Novice results ==
=== Men's figures ===
Rank	Name
1	Danny Clausen
2	Ryan Jahnke
3	Townsend Morris
4	J. Paul Binnebose
5	Everett Weiss
6	Peter Kongkasem
7	Owen Williams
8	Scott Sarbacker
9	Brian Buetsch
10	Dustin Bruening
11	Lucas Turner
12	Benjamin Hwang

=== Ladies ===
Rank	Name	SP	FS
1	Michelle Cho	1	1
2	Kristy Venasky	5	2
3	Crisha Gossard	3	4
4	Jenna Pittman	2	5
5	Emily Freedman	7	3
6	Sonia Kim	9	6
7	Laura Lipetsky	6	8
8	Deana Gerbrick	12	7
9	Jill Beetcher	10	9
10	Amy D'Etremont	8	10
11	Nicole Bobek	11	11
WD	Amanda Ward	4	

=== Ladies' figures ===
Rank	Name
1	Melanie Dupon
2	Ashley Novak
3	Jennifer Lynn Clark
4	Reichen Woods
5	Jessica Alysse Rubin
6	Lori Williamson
7	Cassy Papajohn
8	Sarah Nedrow
9	Bonni Clore
10	Marni Goodman
11	Diane Halber
12	Domenica Palandro

=== Ice dancing ===
Rank	Name	CD1	CD2	OD	FD
1	Kate Black / Kevin Spada				1
2	Jordan Gawinski / Garrett Brockert				3
3	Stephanie Crawford / Greg Maddalone				2
4	Kristina Feliciano / Alex Jacoby				4
5	Jayna Cronin / Jonathan Nicols				5
6	Krissa Neathery / Christopher Rossiter				7
7	Joti Pesek / D.J. Gray				6
8	Julie Wilson / Geoffrey Murfitt				8
9	Elise Suberk / Paul Frey				10
10	Kara Thornham / Jonathan Magalnick				9
11	Mary Cooley / Shawn Jelise				11
12	Tami Tyler / Stith Letsinger				12
