= 1988 U.S. Figure Skating Championships =

Figure skating competition

- Type: National Championship
- Date: January 4 – 10
- Season: 1987–88
- Location: Denver, Colorado

Champions
- Men's singles: Brian Boitano
- Ladies' singles: Debi Thomas
- Pairs: Jill Watson / Peter Oppegard
- Ice dance: Suzanne Semanick / Scott Gregory
- Previous: 1987 U.S. Championships
- Next: 1989 U.S. Championships

The 1988 U.S. Figure Skating Championships took place between January 4 and 10, 1988 in Denver, Colorado. Medals were awarded in four colors: gold (first), silver (second), bronze (third), and pewter (fourth) in four disciplines – men's singles, ladies' singles, pair skating, and ice dancing – across three levels: senior, junior, and novice.

The event was one of the criteria used to select the U.S. teams for the 1988 Winter Olympics, as well as the 1988 World Championships.

== Senior results ==
=== Men ===
Rank	Name	CF	SP	FS
1	Brian Boitano	1	1	1
2	Paul Wylie	3	3	2
3	Christopher Bowman	2	2	3
4	Daniel Doran	4	4	4
5	Angelo D'Agostino	8	5	5
6	Scott Williams	5	10	6
7	James Cygan	6	6	8
8	Todd Eldredge	9	7	7
9	Doug Mattis	7	9	12
10	Rudy Galindo	10	11	10
11	Scott Kurttila	11	8	11
12	Erik Larson	19	13	9
13	Mark Mitchell	14	15	14
14	Craig Heath	15	14	15
15	John Filbig	13	12	17
16	Patrick Brault	17	17	13
17	Brian Grant	12	16	18
18	Jon Robinson	20	19	16
19	Tom Zakrajsek	16	20	19
20	R. Todd Reynolds	18	18	20

=== Ladies ===
Rank	Name	CF	SP	FS
1	Debi Thomas	1	1	1
2	Jill Trenary	3	3	2
3	Caryn Kadavy	2	2	3
4	Jeri Campbell	4	4	5
5	Tonya Harding	8	9	4
6	Holly Cook	7	6	6
7	Cindy Bortz	6	5	7
8	Tracey Damigella	5	8	13
9	Kelly Ann Szmurlo	9	12	10
10	Kristi Yamaguchi	13	13	8
11	Tonia Kwiatkowski	14	7	11
12	Nancy Kerrigan	18	10	9
13	Lisa Cornelius	11	14	12
14	Julie Wasserman	10	17	14
15	Rory Flack	19	11	15
16	Kathaleen Kelly	12	18	18
17	Tracie Brown	15	19	16
18	Elisa Scheuermann	16	16	17
19	Jodi Friedman	17	15	19

=== Pairs ===
Rank	Name	SP	FS
1	Jill Watson / Peter Oppegard	1	1
2	Gillian Wachsman / Todd Waggoner	2	2
3	Natalie Seybold / Wayne Seybold	3	3
4	Katy Keeley / Joseph Mero	4	4
5	Kristi Yamaguchi / Rudy Galindo	5	5
6	Calla Urbanski / Michael Blicharski	9	6
7	Sharon Carz / Doug Williams	8	7
8	Lori Blasko / Todd Sand	7	8
9	Ginger Tse / Archie Tse	6	9
10	Kellie Creel / Robert Pellaton	10	10
11	Shelley Propson / Scott Wendland	12	11
12	Shanda Smith / Brandon Smith	11	13
13	Karen Courtland / David Goodman	15	12
14	Elaine Asanakis / Joel McKeever	14	14
15	Maria Lako / Rocky Marval	13	15
16	Julianne Thompson / Brian Geddeis	16	16

=== Ice dancing ===
Rank	Name	CD	OSP	FD
1	Suzanne Semanick / Scott Gregory	1	1	1
2	Susan Wynne / Joseph Druar	2	2	2
3	April Sargent / Russ Witherby	4	3	3
4	Renée Roca / James Yorke	3	4	4
5	Jodie Balogh / Jerod Swallow	6	5	5
6	Karen Knierim / Leif Erickson	5	6	6
7	Elizabeth McLean / Ari Leib	7	7	7
8	Jeanne Miley / Michael Verlich	8	8	8
9	Dorothi Rodek / Robert Nardozza	9	9	9
10	Ann Hensel / Ron Kravette	10	10	10
11	Jennifer Benz / Jeffrey Benz	11	11	11
12	Lisa Grove / Scott Myers	12	12	13
13	Heidi Hahn / Bill Aquilino	14	13	12
14	Jacqueline Yarema / Kenton Webb	13	14	14

== Junior results ==
=== Men ===
Rank	Name
1	Christopher Mitchell
2	Aren Nielsen
3	Cameron Birky
4	Shepherd Clark
5	Richard Sears
6	Colin Vander Veen
7	Alex Chang
8	Tim Dever
9	Scott Davis
10	Grant Rorvick
11	Gig Siruno
12	Phillip DiGuglielmo
13	Tommy Jasper
14	Lance Travis

=== Ladies ===
Rank	Name	CF	SP	FS
1	Dena Galech			1
2	Jennifer Leng			
3	Shenon Badre			
4	Jessica Mills			
5	Dawn Duhamel			
6	Elizabeth Wright			
7	Katie Wood	1	3	
8	Tisha Walker			
9	Kathryn Curielli			
10	Jennifer Flock			
11	Tina McPherson			
12	Liane Moscato			
13	Melia Heimbuck			

=== Pairs ===
Rank	Name
1	Kenna Bailey / John Denton
2	Jennifer Heurlin / John Fredericksen
3	Natasha Kuchiki / Richard Alexander
4	Paula Visingardi / Jeb Rand
5	Sara Powell / Robert Powell
6	Anne Marie Wells / Brian Wells
7	Catherine Baffo / John Liotta
8	Jocelyn Cox / Brad Cox
9	Dawn Piepenbrink / Tim Dever
10	Hilary Olney / Jeffrey Meyers
11	Wendy Weston / Alexander Enzmann
12	Dawn Goldstein / Troy Goldstein
13	Aimee Offner / Brian Helgenberg
14	Tiffany Bailey / Richard Gillam

=== Ice dancing ===
Rank	Name
1	Elizabeth Punsalan / Shawn Rettstatt
2	Tiffany Veltre / Duane Greenleaf
3	Jennifer Goolsbee / Peter Chupa
4	Rachel Mayer / Peter Breen
5	Kara Berger / Jay Barton
6	Jeannine Jones / Michael Shroge
7	Holly Robbins / Jonathan Stine
8	Andrea Chow / Martin Chow
9	Elizabeth Davidson / Collin Sullivan
10	Regina Woodward / James Curtis
11	Dana Schneider / Stephan Laumann
12	Wendy Mirsky / Peter Mirsky
13	Julie Benz / David Schilling
14	Katherine Williamson / Ben Williamson

== Novice results ==
=== Men ===
Rank	Name
1	Chris Browne
2	Michael Chack
3	Paul Dulebohn
4	Clay Sniteman
5	John Reppucci
6	Michael Weiss
7	Richard Alexander
8	David Grindstaff
9	John Fredericksen
10	John Wright
11	Christopher Beck
12	Michael Orr
R	Randy Scott

=== Ladies ===
Rank	Name
1	Caroline Lee
2	Robyn Petroskey
3	Allyson Fenlon
4	Natasha Kuchiki
5	Stephanie Bush
6	Karen Gooley
7	Heather Sniteman
8	Jennifer Davidson
9	Marianne Diliberti
10	Janet Hoschek
11	Robin Pilossoph
12	Stephanie Hillstron
