= 1989 U.S. Figure Skating Championships =

Figure skating competition

- Type: National Championship
- Date: February
- Season: 1988–89
- Location: Baltimore, Maryland

Champions
- Men's singles: Christopher Bowman
- Ladies' singles: Jill Trenary
- Pairs: Kristi Yamaguchi / Rudy Galindo
- Ice dance: Susan Wynne / Joseph Druar
- Previous: 1988 U.S. Championships
- Next: 1990 U.S. Championships

The 1989 U.S. Figure Skating Championships took place at the CFG Bank Arena in Baltimore, Maryland from February 7th-12th. Medals were awarded in four colors: gold (first), silver (second), bronze (third), and pewter (fourth) in four disciplines – men's singles, ladies' singles, pair skating, and ice dancing – across three levels: senior, junior, and novice.

The event determined the U.S. teams for the 1989 World Championships.

== Senior results ==
=== Men ===
Rank	Name	CF	SP	FS
1	Christopher Bowman	4	1	1
2	Daniel Doran	1	2	5
3	Paul Wylie	6	4	2
4	Erik Larson	8	3	3
5	Todd Eldredge	3	5	4
6	Angelo D'Agostino	7	6	6
7	James Cygan	2	8	7
8	Mark Mitchell	9	7	8
9	Doug Mattis	5	10	10
10	Craig Heath	13	9	9
11	Aren Nielsen	14	12	11
12	Steven Rice	11	11	13
13	Troy Goldstein	12	13	14
14	Jon Robinson	15	15	12
15	Chris Mitchell	10	14	15

=== Ladies ===
Rank	Name	CF	SP	FS
1	Jill Trenary	1	1	2
2	Kristi Yamaguchi	8	2	1
3	Tonya Harding	4	3	3
4	Holly Cook	3	4	4
5	Nancy Kerrigan	7	5	5
6	Kelly Ann Szmurlo	5	7	8
7	Cindy Bortz	6	10	6
8	Tonia Kwiatkowski	11	8	7
9	Tracey Damigella	10	9	9
10	Jenni Meno	13	11	10
11	Jennifer Leng	9	12	12
12	Kathaleen Kelly	12	13	11
13	Kathryn Curielli	14	14	13
WD	Jeri Campbell	2	6	

=== Pairs ===
Rank	Name	SP	FS
1	Kristi Yamaguchi / Rudy Galindo	2	1
2	Natalie Seybold / Wayne Seybold	1	2
3	Katy Keeley / Joseph Mero	3	3
4	Sharon Carz / Doug Williams	4	4
5	Calla Urbanski / Mark Naylor	6	5
6	Kenna Bailey / John Denton	5	6
7	Kellie Creel / Bob Pellaton	7	7
8	Elaine Asanakis / Joel McKeever	8	8
9	Paula Visingardi / Jason Dungjen	9	9
10	Ginger Tse / Archie Tse	11	10
11	Maria Lako / Rocky Marval	10	11
12	Shelley Propson / Scott Wendland	12	12
13	Wendy Weston / Alexander Enzmann	13 (tie)	13
14	Shanda Smith / Brandon Smith	13 (tie)	15
15	Juliane Thompson / Brian Geddeis	16	14
16	Pam Warters / Jeff Warters	15	16

=== Ice dancing ===
Rank	Name	CD1	CD2	OD	FD
1	Susan Wynne / Joseph Druar	1	1	1	1
2	April Sargent / Russ Witherby	2	2	2	2
3	Suzanne Semanick / Ron Kravette	3	3	3	3
4	Jeanne Miley / Michael Verlich	5	5	5	4
5	Beth McLean / Ari Lieb	6	6	6	5
6	Jodie Balogh / Jerod Swallow	7	7	7	6
7	Tracy Sniadach / Leif Erickson	8	8	8	7
8	Elizabeth Punsalan / Shawn Rettstatt			9	8
9	Dorothi Rodek / Robert Nardozza			10	9
10	Lisa Grove / Scott Myers			12	11
11	Regina Woodward / Charles Sinek			13	10
12	Jennifer Benz / Jeffrey Benz			11	12
13	Jennifer Goolsbee / James Schilling			14	13
14	Tiffany Veltre / Duane Greenleaf			15	14
WD	Renée Roca / James Yorke	4	4	4	

== Junior results ==
=== Men ===
Rank	Name	CF	SP	FS
1	Shepherd Clark	1	1	1
2	Colin Vander Veen	6	2	3
3	John Baldwin Jr.	3	4	4
4	Scott Davis	5	7	2
5	Gig Siruno	2	3	6
6	Alex Chang	4	6	7
7	Michael Chack	12	8	5
8	Phillip DiGuglielmo	10	5	8
9	Richard Sears	8	9	10
10	Richard Alexander	11	10	9
11	Tommy Jasper	7	11	11
12	Brian Schmidt	9	10	12

=== Ladies ===
Rank	Name	CF	SP	FS
1	Kyoko Ina	3	2	1
2	Jessica Mills	2	5	2
3	Tisha Walker	6	1	3
4	Geremi Weiss	4	3	4
5	Robyn Petroskey	1	4	5
6	Dawn Duhamel	5	6	8
7	Stacy Rutkowski	9	8	6
8	Berkley Villard	8	12	7
9	Cameryn McCoy	7	7	11
10	Merdith Vaughan	12	10	9
11	Alice Sue Claeys	10	11	10
12	Natasha Kuchiki	11	9	12

=== Pairs ===
Rank	Name	OP	FS
1	Jennifer Heurlin / John Frederiksen	1	1
2	Natasha Kuchiki / Richard Alexander	2	2
3	Ann-Marie Wells / Brian Wells	3	3
4	Angela Deneweth / John Liotta	4	4
5	Susan Purdy / Scott Chiamulera	6	5
6	Paula Losinger / Kenneth Benson	7	6
7	Jocelyn Cox / Brad Cox	5	7
8	Aimee Offner / Brian Helgenberg	8	8
9	Dawn Goldstein / Troy Goldstein	9	9
10	Dawn Piepenbrink / Tim Dever	11	10
11	Hilary Olney / Steven Moore	10	11
12	Tiffany Bailey / Bill Brennan	12	12

=== Ice dancing ===
Rank	Name	CD1	CD2	OD	FD
1	Rachel Mayer / Peter Breen	1	1	1	1
2	Wendy Millette / James Curtis	3	3	2	2
3	Jeannine Jones / Michael Shroge	4	4	3	3
4	Ann-Morton Neale / Laurence Shaffer	2	2	5	4
5	Kara Berger / Jay Barton	5	5	4	5 (tie)
6	Elisa Marie Curtis / Neale Smull	6	6	7	5 (tie)
7	Krista Schulz / Jonathan Stine	8	8	6	7
8	Andrea Chow / Martin Chow	7	7	8	8
9	Katherine Williamson / Ben Williamson	9	9	9	9
10	Leslie Lane / Rob Ferendo	11	11	10	10
11	Rachel Lane / Eric Meier	10	10	11	11
12	Dana Scheider / Stephen Laumann	12	12	12	12
