= 1993 U.S. Figure Skating Championships =

Figure skating competition

- Type: National Championship
- Date: January 16 – 23
- Season: 1992–93
- Location: Phoenix, Arizona
- Host: America West Arena
- Venue: America West Arena; Phoenix Coliseum; Polar Ice

Champions
- Men's singles: Scott Davis
- Ladies' singles: Nancy Kerrigan
- Pairs: Calla Urbanski / Rocky Marval
- Ice dance: Renée Roca / Gorsha Sur
- Previous: 1992 U.S. Championships
- Next: 1994 U.S. Championships

The 1993 U.S. Figure Skating Championships were held in Phoenix, Arizona. Medals were awarded in four colors: gold (first), silver (second), bronze (third), and pewter (fourth) in four disciplines – men's singles, ladies' singles, pair skating, and ice dancing – across three levels: senior, junior, and novice.

The event was also used to determine the U.S. teams for the 1993 World Championships.

== Medalists ==
=== Senior ===
Event	Gold	Silver	Bronze	Pewter
Men	Scott Davis	Mark Mitchell	Michael Chack	Aren Nielsen
Ladies	Nancy Kerrigan	Lisa Ervin	Tonia Kwiatkowski	Tonya Harding
Pairs	Calla Urbanski / Rocky Marval	Jenni Meno / Todd Sand	Karen Courtland / Todd Reynolds	Katie Wood / Joel McKeever
Ice dancing	Renée Roca / Gorsha Sur	Susan Wynne / Russ Witherby	Elizabeth Punsalan / Jerod Swallow	Amy Webster / Ron Kravette

== Senior results ==
=== Men ===
Rank	Name	SP	FS
1	Scott Davis	2	1
2	Mark Mitchell	1	2
3	Michael Chack	6	3
4	Aren Nielsen	4	5
5	Rudy Galindo	7	4
6	Todd Eldredge	3	6
7	Damon Allen	8	7
8	Colin Vander Veen	5	9
9	Shepherd Clark	10	8
10	Dan Hollander	9	10
11	Steven Smith	12	11
12	Craig Heath	11	13
13	Ryan Hunka	15	12
14	Troy Goldstein	14	14
15	Paul Dulebohn	13	15
16	Eddy Zeidler	17	16
17	Brian Schmidt	16	18
18	Mel Chapman	19	17
19	Larry Holliday	18	19

=== Ladies ===
Rank	Name	SP	FS
1	Nancy Kerrigan	1	1
2	Lisa Ervin	5	2
3	Tonia Kwiatkowski	4	3
4	Tonya Harding Gillooly	2	4
5	Nicole Bobek	3	5
6	Michelle Kwan	6	6
7	Caroline Song	9	7
8	Tisha Walker	10	8
9	Keri Anne Thomas	8	10
10	Kyoko Ina	7	11
11	Karen Ann Gooley	11	12
12	Natasha Kuchiki	19	9
13	Dena Galech	14	13
14	Amanda Farkas	13	14
15	Lisa Matras	15	15
16	Sara Kastner	16	16
17	Nicole Wasilewski	18	17
18	Emily June Dulde	17	18
R	Andrea Catoia	12	

=== Pairs ===
Rank	Name	SP	FS
1	Calla Urbanski / Rocky Marval	1	1
2	Jenni Meno / Todd Sand	2	2
3	Karen Courtland / Todd Reynolds	3	3
4	Katie Wood / Joel McKeever	5	5
5	Kyoko Ina / Jason Dungjen	8	4
6	Jennifer Perez / John Frederiksen	6	6
7	Tristen Vega / Richard Alexander	4	7
8	Tracey Damigella / Doug Williams	7	8
9	Aimee Marie Offner / Brad Cox	10	9
10	Dawn Goldstein / Troy Goldstein	9	10
11	Dawn Piepenbrink / Nick Castaneda	13	11
12	Holly Benson / Steven Moore	11	12
13	Nicole Sciarrotta / Gregory Sciarrotta	12	13
14	Erin Moorad / Ken Benson	14	14
15	Tristan Colell / Brian Helgenberg	15	15
16	Kate Robinson / Paul Spevetz	17	16
17	Jennifer Darst / Floyd Johnson	16	17
WD	Laura Murphy / Brian Wells		

=== Ice dancing ===
Rank	Name	CD1	CD2	OD	FD
1	Renée Roca / Gorsha Sur	1	1	1	1
2	Susan Wynne / Russ Witherby	2	2	2	2
3	Elizabeth Punsalan / Jerod Swallow	4	4	3	3
4	Amy Webster / Ron Kravette	5	3	4	4
5	Rachel Mayer / Peter Breen	3	5	5	5
6	Jennifer Nocito / Michael Verlich	6	6	6	6
7	Tamara Kuchiki / Neale Smull	7	8	8	7
8	Mimi Wacholder / Collin Vail Sullivan	10	7	7	8
9	Wendy Millette / Jason Tebo	8	10	9	9
10	Cheryl Demkowski / Sean Gales	11	11	10	10
11	Ann-Morton Neal / Robert Peal	9	9	11	11
12	Galit Chait / Max Sevastianov	12	13	13	12
13	Kimberly Callahan / Jonathon Stine	14	14	12	14
14	Melinda Sweezey / Gray Irving	13	12	15	13
15	Christine Fowler / Garrett Swasey	15	15	16	16
16	Brandy Valencia / Augustine DiBella	16	16	14	17
17	Rachel Lane / Ben Williamson	17	17	17	15
18	Michelle Maler / Anthony Darnell	18	19	18	18
19	Samantha Liegner / Jeffrey Czarnecki	19	18	19	20
20	Sian Matthews / Doug Murray	21	21	20	19
21	Dawn Goldstein / Troy Goldstein	20	20	21	21

== Junior results ==
=== Ladies ===
Rank	Name	SP	FS
1	Michelle Cho	1	1
2	Jenna Pitman	2	2
3	Teresa Aiello	3	3
4	Tanya Street	4	4
5	Lisa Bell	6	5
6	Lefki Terzakis		
7	Laura Lipetsky		
8	Melissa Ann Nelson		
9	Kristy Venasky		
10	Amy D'Entremont		
11	Jennifer Eastman		
12	Robin Heckler		
13	Bethany Quintin		
14	Lisa Talbot		

=== Pairs ===
Rank	Name	SP	FS
1	Stephanie Stiegler / Lance Travis	1	1
2	Robin Heckler / Jeff Tilley	3	2
3	Liberte Sheldon / Russ Scott	4	3
4	Cheryl Marker / Todd Price	2	4
5	Erin Covington / Brandon Powell	6	5
6	Emily Pirronello / Brent Echols	10	6
7	Danielle Hartsell / Steve Hartsell	8	7
8	Nicole Bateson-Rock / Keith Tindall	7	8
9	Anne Ramos / Benjamin Oberman	5	10
10	Kristen Youlden / Fred Palascak	9	9
11	Ali Blank / Jeb Gerth	13	11
12	Andrea Catoia / Jason Corley	11	12
13	Cory Jo Richert / Chad Richert	12	13
14	Akemi Kawaguchi / Ron Brilliant	14	14

=== Ice Dance ===
Rank	Name
1	Kimberly Hartley / Michael Sklutovsky
2	Christina Fitzgerald / Mark Fitzgerald
3	Tiffani Tucker / Frank Singley
4	Carissa Green / Gregory Maddalone
5	Kate Black / Kevin Spada
6	Debbie Koegel / Hayes-Alan Knorr
7	Nicole Dumonceaux / John Reppucci
8	Laura Gayton / Peter Abraham
9	Jordan Gawinski / Garrett Brockert
10	Melissa Boney / Gerald Miele
11	Jayna Cronin / Jonathan Nichols
12	Ceila Cohen / Yovanny Durango
13	Erin McCabe / Christopher Rossiter
