= 1991 U.S. Figure Skating Championships =

Figure skating competition

- Type: National Championship
- Date: February 12 – 17
- Season: 1990–91
- Location: Minneapolis, Minnesota
- Host: Target Center

Champions
- Men's singles: Todd Eldredge
- Ladies' singles: Tonya Harding
- Pairs: Natasha Kuchiki / Todd Sand
- Ice dance: Elizabeth Punsalan / Jerod Swallow
- Previous: 1990 U.S. Championships
- Next: 1992 U.S. Championships

The 1991 U.S. Figure Skating Championships took place at the Target Center in Minneapolis, Minnesota. Medals were awarded in four colors: gold (first), silver (second), bronze (third), and pewter (fourth) in six disciplines – men's singles, ladies' singles, pair skating, ice dancing, men's figures and ladies's figures – across three levels: senior, junior, and novice.

The event determined the U.S. teams for the 1991 World Championships.

== Senior results ==
=== Men ===
Rank	Name	SP	FS
1	Todd Eldredge	2	1
2	Christopher Bowman	1	2
3	Paul Wylie	4	3
4	Mark Mitchell	3	4
5	Michael Chack	6	5
6	Erik Larson	7	6
7	Shepherd Clark	5	7
8	Scott Davis	8	8
9	Craig Heath	9	9
10	Daniel Doran	11	10
11	Rudy Galindo	12	11
12	Aren Nielsen	10	12
13	Doug Mattis	14	13
14	Colin VanderVeen	13	14
15	Alex Chang	15	15
16	Richard Sears	16	16

=== Men's figures ===
Rank	Name
1	Craig Heath
2	Michael Weiss
3	Gig Siruno
4	Brian Schmidt
5	J. Robert Morris, Jr.
6	Troy Goldstein
7	Jay Murphy
8	Michael Dennis, Jr.
9	Dan Hollander

=== Ladies ===
Rank	Name	SP	FS
1	Tonya Harding	2	1
2	Kristi Yamaguchi	1	2
3	Nancy Kerrigan	3	3
4	Tonia Kwiatkowski	6	4
5	Tisha Walker	5	5
6	Holly Cook	4	6
7	Kyoko Ina	10	7
8	Nicole Bobek	8	8
9	Jeri Campbell	7	9
10	Stacy Rutkowski	9	10
11	Tamara Kuchiki	11	11
12	Rosanna Tovi	12	12
13	Jessica Mills	13	13
14	Leanna Naczynski	14	14

=== Pairs ===
Rank	Name	SP	FS
1	Natasha Kuchiki / Todd Sand	1	2
2	Calla Urbanski / Rocky Marval	4	1
3	Jenni Meno / Scott Wendland	3	3
4	Sharon Carz / Doug Williams	5	4
5	Karen Courtland / Jason Dungjen	2	6
6	Jennifer Heurlin / John Frederiksen	6	5
7	Tristen Vega / Richard Alexander	9	7
8	Laura Murphy / Brian Wells	7	8
9	Susan Purdy / Scott Chimulera	9	8
10	Dawn Goldstein / Troy Goldstein	12	10
11	Laura Lynn LaBarca / Kenneth Benson	10	11
12	Erin Moorad / Jeff Myers	11	12
13	Annette Abel / William Abel	13	13
14	Wendy Weston / Alexander Enzmann	14	14
WD	Elaine Asanakis / Joel McKeever		

=== Ice dancing ===
Rank	Name	CD1	CD2	OD	FD
1	Elizabeth Punsalan / Jerod Swallow			2	1
2	April Sargent / Russ Witherby			1	3
3	Jeanne Miley / Michael Verlich			3	2
4	Elizabeth McLean / Ron Kravette			4	4
5	Amy Webster / Leif Erickson			5	5
6	Rachel Mayer / Peter Breen			6	6
7	Beth Buhl / Neale Smull			7	7
8	Elisa Curtis / Robert Nardozza			8	8
9	Lisa Grove / Scott Myers			9	9
10	Wendy Millette / James Curtis			11	10
11	Ann Morton Neale / Laurence Shaffer			10	12
12	Mimi Wacholder / Collin Vail Sullivan			12	11
13	Hillary Olney / Michael Shroge			13	13

== Junior results ==
=== Men ===
Rank	Name	SP	FS
1	Damon Allen	1	1
2	John Baldwin Jr.	2	2
3	Ryan Hunka	5	3
4	Steven B. Smith	3	4
5	Paul Dulebohn	4	5
6	Dan Hollander	7	6
7	Richard Alexander	6	7
8	Lance Travis	8	8
9	John Frederiksen	9	9

=== Ladies ===
Rank	Name	SP	FS
1	Lisa Ervin	2	1
2	Joanna Ng	1	2
3	Karen Anne Gooley	3	3
4	Tristen Vega	6	4
5	Bridgit Ryan	7	5
6	Charlene Vom Saher	5	7
7	Amanda Farkas	8	6
8	Robyn Petroskey	4	8
9	Keri-Anne Thomas	11	9
10	Dana Mednick	9	11
11	Tracy Vopnford	12	11
WD	Jennifer Verill		

=== Pairs ===
Rank	Name	SP	FS
1	Aimee Offner / Brian Helgenberg	1	1
2	Cambria Goodman / Steven Moore	2	2
3	Kara Paxton / Brad Cox	3	3
4	Nicole Sciarrotta / Gregory Sciarrotta	4	4
5	Dawn Piepenbrink / Nick Castaneda	6	5
6	Kristy Bingham / Carmine Marinari	7	6
7	Victoria Cargas / Mel Chapman	5	8
8	Tristan Colell / John Baldwin Jr.	8	7
9	Dana Mednick / Lance Travis	9	9
10	Michelle Tilley / Jeff Tilley	10	10
11	Jamie-Maria Sharpe / David Walker	12	11
12	Heather Hughes / Keith Tindall	11	12

=== Ice dancing ===
Kim Callahan / Robert Peal // 1 Rachel Lane / Eric Meier // 2 Michelle Mailer / Tony Darnell // 3
