= 1994 U.S. Figure Skating Championships =

Figure skating competition

- Type: National Championship
- Date: January 4 – 8
- Season: 1993–94
- Location: Detroit, Michigan
- Venue: Joe Louis Arena

Champions
- Men's singles: Scott Davis
- Women's singles: None
- Pairs: Jenni Meno and Todd Sand
- Ice dance: Elizabeth Punsalan and Jerod Swallow
- Previous: 1993 U.S. Championships
- Next: 1995 U.S. Championships

The 1994 U.S. Figure Skating Championships were held at the Joe Louis Arena in Detroit, Michigan. Medals were awarded in four colors: gold (first), silver (second), bronze (third), and pewter (fourth) in four disciplines – men's singles, ladies' singles, pair skating, and ice dancing – across three levels: senior, junior, and novice. The event was used to determine the U.S. teams for the 1994 Winter Olympics and the 1994 World Championships.

The competition was famous for the return of previous Olympians Brian Boitano and Elaine Zayak, as well as the pre-competition attack on Nancy Kerrigan by associates of skater Tonya Harding. Harding subsequently was stripped of her ladies' championship title after she pleaded guilty to failing to report the assault to the police after the fact, although she maintains that she had no knowledge of the attack beforehand.

== Medalists ==
=== Senior ===
Event	Gold	Silver	Bronze	Pewter
Men	Scott Davis	Brian Boitano	Aren Nielsen	Todd Eldredge
Ladies	No champion^{†}	Michelle Kwan	Nicole Bobek	Elaine Zayak
Pairs	Jenni Meno / Todd Sand	Kyoko Ina / Jason Dungjen	Karen Courtland / Todd Reynolds	Natasha Kuchiki / Rocky Marval
Ice dancing	Elizabeth Punsalan / Jerod Swallow	Susan Wynne / Russ Witherby	Amy Webster / Ron Kravette	Wendy Millette / Jason Tebo

^† In June 1994, U.S. Figure Skating voted to no longer recognize Tonya Harding's 1994 win. The gold medal position was left vacant; the other competitors did not move up one position.

=== Junior ===
Event	Gold	Silver	Bronze	Pewter
Men	Jere Michael	Jason Sylvia	Johnnie Bevan	Matthew Kessinger
Ladies	Jennifer Karl	Amanda Ward	Lisa Bell	Chrisha Gossard
Pairs	Nicole Bateson Rock / Keith Tindall	Cheryl Marker / Todd Price	Sara Ward / J. Paul Binnebose	Danielle Hartsell / Steve Hartsell
Ice dancing	Laura Gayton / Oleg Fediukov	Carissa Green / Gregory Maddalone	Eve Chalom / Mathew Gates	Nicole Dumonceaux / John Repucci

== Senior results ==
=== Men ===
Rank	Name	SP	FS
1	Scott Davis	2	1
2	Brian Boitano	1	2
3	Aren Nielsen	5	3
4	Todd Eldredge	3	4
5	Mark Mitchell	6	5
6	Shepherd Clark	4	6
7	Rudy Galindo	9	7
8	Michael Weiss	7	8
9	Damon Allen	8	9
10	Dan Hollander	11	10
11	Colin VanderVeen	10	11
12	Gig Siruno	12	12
13	John Baldwin Jr.	18	13
14	Paul Dulebohn	16	14
15	Mel Chapman	15	15
16	Glenn Armstrong	18	16
WD	Steven Smith	13	
WD	Larry Holliday	14	

=== Ladies ===
Rank	Name	SP	FS
DSQ	Tonya Harding	DSQ	DSQ
2	Michelle Kwan	3	2
3	Nicole Bobek	2	3
4	Elaine Zayak	4	4
5	Tonia Kwiatkowski	6	5
6	Michelle Cho	7	6
7	Lisa Ervin	5	8
8	Jessica Mills	8	7
9	Teresa Aiello	11	9
10	Amanda Farkas	10	10
11	Lisa Matras	13	11
12	Keri Anne Thomas	9	13
13	Denise Long	15	12
14	Lisa Talbot	16	14
15	Jennifer Verili	14	15
16	Patricia Mansfield	18	16
WD	Jenna Pittman	12	
WD	Melissa Ann Nelson	17	

=== Pairs ===
Rank	Name	SP	FS
1	Jenni Meno / Todd Sand	1	1
2	Kyoko Ina / Jason Dungjen	2	2
3	Karen Courtland / Todd Reynolds	3	3
4	Natasha Kuchiki / Rocky Marval	4	4
5	Stephanie Stiegler / Lance Travis	7	5
6	Tristen Vega / Joel McKeever	6	6
7	Calla Urbanski / Joseph Mero	5	7
8	Jennifer Perez / John Frederiksen	8	8
9	Aimee Offner / Brad Cox	10	9
10	Sharon Carz / Troy Goldstein	12	10
11	Holly Benson / Steven Moore	11	11
12	Tracey Damigella / Doug Williams	14	12
13	Laura Murphy / Brian Wells	13	13
14	Robin Heckler / Jeff Tilley	9	15
15	Erin Moorad / Richard Gillam	16	14
WD	Dawn Piepenbrink / Nick Castaneda	15	

=== Ice dancing ===
Rank	Name	CD1	CD2	OD	FD
1	Elizabeth Punsalan / Jerod Swallow	2	1	1	1
2	Susan Wynne / Russ Witherby	3	4	3	2
3	Amy Webster / Ron Kravette	4	3	4	3
4	Wendy Millette / Jason Tebo	5	5	6	4
5	Tamara Kuchiki / Neale Smull	7	6	5	5
6	Galit Chait / Maxim Sevostianov	6	7	7	6
7	Julia Bikbova / Robert Peal	8	8	8	7
8	Christina Fitzgerald / Mark Fitzgerald	9	9	9	8
9	Cheryl Demkowski / Sean Gates	11	10	10	9
10	Mica Darley / Michael Sklutovsky	12	11	11	10
11	Elizabeth Buhl / Augustine DiBella	10	12	12	12
12	Tiffani Tucker / Collin Vail Sullivan	13	13	13	11
13	Sian Matthews / Yovanny Durango	14	14	14	13
14	Melissa Boney / Gerald Miele	15	15	15	14
WD	Renee Roca / Gorsha Sur	1	2	2	

== Junior results ==
=== Men ===
Rank	Name	SP	FS
1	Jere Michael	1	1
2	Jason Sylvia	2	3
3	Johnnie Bevan	5	2
4	Matthew Kessinger	6	4
5	Eric Bohnstedt	4	5
6	Trifun Zivanovic	3	6
7	Derrick Delmore	8	7
8	Roman Fraden	7	8
9	Derek Stedingh	9	9
10	Jamie Loper	11	10
11	Eddie Gornik	12	11
12	Michael Edgren	10	13
13	Erik Rockwell	13	12
14	Michael Demetrius Orr	13	14

=== Ladies ===
Rank	Name	SP	FS
1	Jennifer Karl	4	1
2	Amanda Ward	3	2
3	Lisa Bell	1	4
4	Crisha Gossard	6	3
5	Angela Nikodinov	2	5
6	Amy D'Entremont	7	6
7	Brittney McConn	5	7
8	Amber Corwin	8	8
9	Emily Freedman	10	9
10	Jaime Lea Lund	11	10
11	Serena Phillips	9	12
12	Kristy Venasky	12	11

=== Pairs ===
Rank	Name	SP	FS
1	Nicole Bateson-Rock / Keith Tindall	1	1
2	Cheryl Marker / Todd Price	2	2
3	Sara Ward / J. Paul Binnebose	4	3
4	Danielle Hartsell / Steve Hartsell	3	4
5	Celina Taylor / Mel Chapman	5	5
6	Ari Blank / Jeb Gerth	8	6
7	Nicole Perry / David Delago	6	7
8	Anne Ramos / Benjamin Oberman	9	8
9	Lauren Weldon / Jim Peterson	7	9
10	Kristen Youlden / Fred Palascak	10	10
11	Melanie Lambert / Robert Van Uitert	11	11
12	Erin Fisher / Eddy Zeidler	16	12
13	Erin Covington / Brandon Powell	12	14
14	Akemi Kawaguchi / Ron Brilliant	15	13
15	Allison Rochford / Robert Rochford	13	15
16	Breanne Heldman / Jeremiah Jackson	12	16

=== Ice dancing ===
Rank	Name	CD1	CD2	OD	FD
1	Laura Gayton / Oleg Fediukov	1	1	1	1
2	Carissa Green / Gregory Maddalone	2	2	2	2
3	Eve Chalom / Mathew Gates	3	3	3	3
4	Nicole Dumonceaux / John Repucci	5	5	4	4
5	Jayna Cronin / Jonathan Nichols	4	4	5	5
6	Tami Tyler / Stith Letsinger	6	6	6	6
7	Kari Downey / Garrett Brockert	7	7	7	7
8	Kristina Feliciano / Alex Jacoby	8	8	8	8
9	Jamie Coffey / Kurt Dreger	9	9	9	10
10	Dawn Ponte / Paul Frey	13	10	10	9
11	Michelle Poley / Kevin Spada	10	11	11	12
12	Darlin Baker / D.J. Gray	12	12	12	11
13	Daniela Lopez / Andres Lopez	15	14	14	13
14	Celia Cohen / Shawn Jellse	14	15	13	14
15	Jenny Dahlen / Sergei Lihachov	11	13	15	15

== Reinstatement of professionals to amateur status ==
Amateurs who turned professional had been banned from returning to compete as amateurs. This ban was removed and Brian Boitano and Elaine Zayak sought to compete in order to go to the 1994 Winter Olympics.

Having retired from competitive skating after winning Olympic gold in 1988 and the 1988 World Championships, four time men's champion Brian Boitano announced a comeback and would compete to get a place on the 1994 Olympic team. This was highly controversial as he had skated professionally for many years and fought to get former professionals reinstated for amateur competitions. He placed second behind Scott Davis and made the Olympic team as the United States had 2 spots.

== Kerrigan–Harding controversy ==
The January 6, 1994, attack on 1993 champion and Ladies gold frontrunner Nancy Kerrigan preceded the event. The widely publicized attack took place during a practice session for the 1994 U.S. Figure Skating Championships in Detroit. Tonya Harding's ex-husband, Jeff Gillooly, and her bodyguard, Shawn Eckardt, hired Shane Stant to strike Kerrigan on the knee, though Stant actually struck Kerrigan's thigh a few inches above the knee. Kerrigan's injury forced her withdrawal, and Harding won the event.

After Harding admitted to helping to cover up the attack, the USFSA and United States Olympic Committee initiated proceedings to remove her from the 1994 Olympic team, but Harding retained her place after threatening legal action. She finished eighth in the 1994 Winter Olympics in Lillehammer, Norway, while Kerrigan, who recovered from her injuries, finished second.

== Collision ==
During a warm-up, ice dancer Renée Roca was skating backward and collided with the team of Galit Chait and Maksim Sevostyanov, fracturing a bone in her left arm. Two hours later, she returned from the hospital with her arm in a cast and decided to try to compete. She and partner Gorsha Sur placed second in the rhumba, however, Roca was unable to secure a firm grip with her left hand, and had to withdraw from the rest of the competition.
