= 1996 U.S. Figure Skating Championships =

Figure skating competition

- Type: National Championship
- Date: January 13 – 21
- Season: 1995–96
- Location: San Jose, California
- Venue: San Jose Arena

Champions
- Men's singles: Rudy Galindo
- Ladies' singles: Michelle Kwan
- Pairs: Jenni Meno / Todd Sand
- Ice dance: Elizabeth Punsalan / Jerod Swallow
- Previous: 1995 U.S. Championships
- Next: 1997 U.S. Championships

The 1996 U.S. Figure Skating Championships took place between January 13 and 21, 1996 in San Jose, California. Skaters competed in five disciplines across three levels. The disciplines of the competition were men's singles, ladies' singles, pair skating, ice dancing, and compulsory figures. The levels of competition were Senior, Junior, and Novice. Medals were awarded in four colors: gold (first), silver (second), bronze (third), and pewter (fourth). In the figures event, the novice competitors skated one figure, and the juniors and seniors skated three.

Rudy Galindo’s win made him the first openly gay U.S. figure skating champion.

The event served to help choose the U.S. team to the 1996 World Championships. The 1996 World Junior Championships had been held prior to the national championships and so the World Junior Championships team had been chosen at a World Juniors selection competition earlier in the year.

== Senior results ==
=== Men ===
Rank	Name	FP	SP	FS
1	Rudy Galindo	2.5	3	1
2	Todd Eldredge	2.5	1	2
3	Dan Hollander	5.0	4	3
4	Scott Davis	6.0	2	5
5	Michael Weiss	6.5	5	4
6	Shepherd Clark	9.0	6	6
7	Trifun Zivanovic	11.5	9	7
8	Aren Nielsen	11.5	7	8
9	Matthew Kessinger	14.5	11	9
10	Johnnie Bevan	15.0	10	10
11	John Baldwin Jr.	17.0	8	13
12	Gig Siruno	17.5	13	11
13	Jere Michael	19.0	14	12
14	Eric Bohnstedt	22.0	16	14
15	E. Stuart Golden	23.5	17	15
16	Philip Dulebohn	23.5	15	16
WD	Derrick Delmore		12	

=== Ladies ===
Rank	Name	FP	SP	FS
1	Michelle Kwan	1.5	1	1
2	Tonia Kwiatkowski	3.0	2	2
3	Tara Lipinski	5.5	5	3
4	Sydne Vogel	6.0	4	4
5	Karen Kwan	8.0	6	5
6	Amber Corwin	11.5	11	6
7	Brittney McConn	11.5	9	7
8	Angela Nikodinov	12.5	7	9
9	Jennifer Karl	14.0	12	8
10	Alice Sue Claeys	15.0	10	10
11	Jessica Mills	15.0	8	11
12	Kathaleen Kelly Cutone	19.0	14	12
13	Robyn Petroskey	19.5	15	12
14	Alizah Allen	20.5	13	14
15	Jillian Jackson	23.5	17	15
16	Karen Gooley	24.0	16	16
WD	Nicole Bobek		3	

=== Pairs ===
Rank	Name	FP	SP	FS
1	Jenni Meno / Todd Sand	2.0	2	1
2	Kyoko Ina / Jason Dungjen	2.5	1	2
3	Shelby Lyons / Brian Wells	5.0	4	3
4	Stephanie Stiegler / John Zimmerman	5.5	3	4
5	Sara Ward / Lance Travis	7.5	7	5
6	Cheryl Marker / Todd Price	9.0	6	6
7	Romina Baron / Richard Alexander	10.5	5	8
8	Danielle Hartsell / Steve Hartsell	11.5	9	7
9	Melanie Lambert / Fred Palascak	13.0	8	9
10	Dawn Lynn Piepenbrink / Nicolas Castaneda	16.0	12	10
11	Erin Elbe / Jeffrey Weiss	18.0	14	11
12	Jennifer Darst / Arthur Reid	18.5	13	12
13	Nicole Perry / Paul Dulebohn	18.5	11	13
14	Lauren Weldon / Jason Carley	22.0	16	14
15	Amanda Magarian / Mel Chapman	22.5	15	15
WD	Nicole Bateson-Rock / Jeff Tilley		10	

=== Ice dancing ===
Rank	Name	FP	CD1	CD2	OD	FD
1	Elizabeth Punsalan / Jerod Swallow	2.2	1	2	1	1
2	Renée Roca / Gorsha Sur	3.8	2	1	2	2
3	Eve Chalom / Mathew Gates	7.2	7	5	3	3
4	Kate Robinson / Peter Breen	8.0	4	4	4	4
5	Amy Webster / Ron Kravette	9.2	3	3	5	5
6	Julia Bikbova / Robert Peale	13.4	5	6	7	7
7	Cheryl Demkowski / Gregory Maddalone	15.0	10	8	9	6
8	Laura Gayton / Oleg Fediukov	16.2	8	9	8	8
9	Tamara Kuchiki / Neale Smull	16.2	6	7	6	10
10	Elizabeth Buhl / Augustine DiBella	18.8	9	10	10	9
11	Kimberly Callahan / Robert Daw	22.0	11	11	11	11
12	Leslie Soderberg / David Lipowitz	25.6	15	14	13	12
13	Sophia Eliazova / Peter Tchernyshev	27.0	12	12	12	15
14	Felita Carr / Alexei Komarov	27.6	13	15	15	13
15	Debbie Koegel / Michael Sklutovsky	28.2	14	15	14	14

== Junior results ==
=== Men ===
Rank	Name	FP	SP	FS
1	Timothy Goebel	1.5	1	1
2	Jeff Merica	4.5	5	2
3	Ryan Jahnke	5.0	4	3
4	Justin Dillon	6.5	3	5
5	Don Baldwin	7.0	2	6
6	Robert Schupp	8.0	8	4
7	Bert Cording	10.5	7	7
8	Danny Clausen	12.0	6	9
9	Eddie Gornik	12.5	9	8
10	Ryan Donnelly	15.0	10	10
11	Pete St. Germaine	16.5	11	11
12	Dwayne Parker	18.0	12	12
13	Bobby Kaping	19.5	13	13

=== Ladies ===
Rank	Name	FP	SP	FS
1	Shelby Lyons	3.0	4	1
2	Erin Sutton	3.0	2	2
3	Diana Miro	3.5	1	3
4	Serena Phillips	5.5	3	4
5	Morgan Rowe	7.5	5	5
6	Cohen Duncan	9.5	7	6
7	Emily Freedman	10.0	6	7
8	Andrea Gardiner	12.0	8	8
9	Rhea Sy	13.5	9	9
10	Heather Johnson	17.0	14	10
11	Tiffany Chan	17.5	13	11
12	Meredith Cataldo	17.5	11	12
13	Kelly Harris	18.0	10	13
14	Tina Lee	19.0	12	13

=== Pairs ===
Rank	Name	FP	SP	FS
1	Natalie Vlandis / Jered Guzman	1.5	1	1
2	Naomi Grabow / Benjamin Oberman	3.0	2	2
3	Jacki Davidson / J. Paul Binnebose	5.0	4	3
4	Tiffany Stiegler / Johnnie Stiegler	6.5	5	4
5	Katie Bernhart / Charles Bernhart IV	6.5	3	5
6	Celina Taylor / Craig Joeright	9.5	7	6
7	Whitney Gaynore / David Delago	10.0	6	7
8	Nicole Purdy / Josiah Modes	12.5	9	8
9	Ilana Goldfogel / Erik Schulz	13.5	11	8
10	Laura Handy / Jim Peterson	14.0	8	10
11	Lauren Carpenter / Brad Russi	16.0	10	11
12	Kelly Peterman / Matthew Stuart	18.0	12	12
13	Heather Allenbach / Matthews Evers	19.5	13	13

=== Ice dancing ===
Rank	Name	FP	CD1	CD2	OD	FD
1	Jessica Joseph / Charles Butler	2.2	2	1	1	1
2	Naomi Lang / John Lee	3.8	1	2	2	2
3	Tami Tyler / Jonathan Nichols	7.2	6	3	4	3
4	Azumi Sagara / Jonathan Magalnick	7.4	4	4	3	4
5	Kerrie O'Donnell / Brandon Forsyth	10.4	3	9	5	5
6	Christine Moxley / Tom Gaasbeck	12.2	7	6	6	6
7	Jenny Dahlen / Sergei Lihachov	13.2	5	5	7	7
8	Melissa Gregory / James Shuford	15.8	8	7	8	8
9	Kari Downey / Raphael Kelling	18.8	9	10	10	9
10	Susanna Stapleford / Vincent van Vliet	19.0	10	8	9	10
11	Natalie Wolenter / Kevin Spada	23.2	12	11	11	12
12	Elizabeth Hill / Eleazar Lieb	23.4	11	12	13	11
13	Kristin Fraser / Peter Kongkasem	25.4	13	13	12	13

== Novice results ==
=== Men ===
Rank	Name	FP	SP	FS
1	Joe Knazek	2.0	2	1
2	Braden Overett	4.0	4	2
3	Kurt Fromknecht	4.5	3	3
4	Matthew Savoie	4.5	1	4
5	Curt Doten	8.0	6	5
6	Andrew Eckard	8.5	5	6
7	Amir Ganaba	12.5	7	9
8	Jonathan Keen	13.0	12	7
9	David Recchia	13.5	11	8
10	Josh Figurido	14.5	9	10
11	Derek Trent	16.0	10	11
12	Steve Hartsell	17.0	8	13
13	David Glynn	19.5	15	12
14	Joseph Walsh	22.0	16	14
15	Sean Calvillo	22.0	14	15
WD	Jered Guzman		13	

=== Ladies ===
Rank	Name	FP	SP	FS
1	J.J. Mathews	2.0	2	1
2	Christina Gordon	4.5	3	3
3	Abby Davidson	4.5	1	4
4	Rinne Brayman	7.5	11	2
5	Kristina Melton	8.5	5	6
6	Elizabeth O'Donnell	10.0	4	8
7	Angie Lien	11.5	13	5
8	Erin Pearl	11.5	9	7
9	Danielle Hartsell	14.0	10	9
10	Sarah Call	14.0	8	10
11	Laura Handy	14.0	6	11
12	Mika Kadono	15.5	7	12
13	Kristen Treni	19.0	12	13

=== Pairs ===
Rank	Name	FP	SP	FS
1	Brandi Seabol / Cheyne Coppage	1.5	1	1
2	Carissa Guild / Andrew Muldoon	3.0	2	2
3	Christina Connally / Arnold Myint	5.0	4	3
4	Megan Sierk / Dustin Sierk	5.5	3	4
5	Rebecca Erb / Joel Vinson	8.0	6	5
6	Crystal Kim / Derrick Delmore	8.5	5	6
7	Amy Wisely / Jason Heffron	10.5	7	7
8	Jessica Hunt / Jonathon Hunt	12.0	8	8
9	Darby Gaynor / James Bonnie	15.0	12	9
10	Alexsis Nolte / Justin Dillon	15.5	11	10
11	Jessica Montgomery / Amaan Archer	16.0	10	11

=== Ice dancing ===
Rank	Name	FP	CD1	CD2	OD	FD
1	Jamie Silverstein / Justin Pekarek	2.0	1	1	1	1
2	Elizabeth Philpot / Nick Hart	5.0	3	3	3	2
3	Alison Sandler / Nicholas Wakeman	5.0	2	2	2	3
4	Kimberly Jones / Timothy Jones	8.2	4	5	4	4
5	Katherine Jorck / Matt Healy	10.2	7	4	5	5
6	Rebecca Weisberg / Owen Swift	13.4	6	7	8	6
7	Hannah Lawler / Scott Stewart	14.0	5	9	7	7
8	Katharine Hill / Benjamin Agosto	15.0	8	6	6	8
9	Jessica Roswell / Matther Kossack	17.8	9	8	9	9
10	Kimberly Navarro / Matthew Tinney	21.8	11	12	12	10
11	Jennifer Sejnowski / Dmitry White	21.6	12	11	10	11
12	Sarah Alesafar / John Wagner	22.6	10	10	11	12
