= 1995 U.S. Figure Skating Championships =

Figure skating competition

- Type: National Championship
- Date: February 7 – 11
- Season: 1994–95
- Location: Providence, Rhode Island
- Venue: Providence Civic Center

Champions
- Men's singles: Todd Eldredge
- Ladies' singles: Nicole Bobek
- Pairs: Jenni Meno / Todd Sand
- Ice dance: Renée Roca / Gorsha Sur
- Previous: 1994 U.S. Championships
- Next: 1996 U.S. Championships

The 1995 U.S. Figure Skating Championships took place between February 7 and 11, 1995, in Providence, Rhode Island. Medals were awarded in four colors: gold (first), silver (second), bronze (third), and pewter (fourth) in four disciplines – men's singles, ladies' singles, pair skating, and ice dancing – across three levels: senior, junior, and novice.

== Medalists ==
=== Senior ===
Event	Gold	Silver	Bronze	Pewter
Men	Todd Eldredge	Scott Davis	Aren Nielsen	Damon Allen
Ladies	Nicole Bobek	Michelle Kwan	Tonia Kwiatkowski	Kyoko Ina
Pairs	Jenni Meno / Todd Sand	Kyoko Ina / Jason Dungjen	Stephanie Stiegler / Lance Travis	Shelby Lyons / Brian Wells
Ice dancing	Renée Roca / Gorsha Sur	Elizabeth Punsalan / Jerod Swallow	Amy Webster / Ron Kravette	Kate Robinson / Peter Breen

== Senior results ==
=== Men ===
Rank	Name	SP	FS
1	Todd Eldredge	2	1
2	Scott Davis	1	2
3	Aren Nielsen	5	3
4	Damon Allen	4	4
5	Shepherd Clark	3	6
6	Michael Weiss	8	5
7	Dan Hollander	6	7
8	Rudy Galindo	9	8
9	John Baldwin Jr.	10	9
10	Michael Chack	7	11
11	Jason Sylvia	11	10
12	Derek Stedingh	12	12
13	Russ Scott	14	13
14	Mel Chapman	13	14
15	Brian Buetsch	14	15

=== Ladies ===
Rank	Name	SP	FS
1	Nicole Bobek	2	1
2	Michelle Kwan	3	2
3	Tonia Kwiatkowski	1	3
4	Kyoko Ina	4	4
5	Patricia Mansfield	6	6
6	Lisa Matras	5	7
7	Karen Kwan	10	5
8	Jessica Mills	11	8
9	Laura Lipetsky	9	9
10	Tanya Street	7	10
11	Kathaleen Kelly Cutone	8	12
12	Teresa Aiello	14	11
13	Joanna Ng	12	13
14	Lisa Bell	13	14
15	Chrisha Gossard	15	15
16	Amber Corwin	16	16

=== Pairs ===
Rank	Name	SP	FS
1	Jenni Meno / Todd Sand	1	1
2	Kyoko Ina / Jason Dungjen	2	2
3	Stephanie Stiegler / Lance Travis	3	3
4	Shelby Lyons / Brian Wells	4	4
5	Cheryl Marker / Todd Price	5	5
6	Aimee Offner / Brad Cox	8	6
7	Romina Baron / Richard Alexander	6	7
8	Holly Benson / Steven Moore	7	8
9	Nicole Bateson-Rock / Keith Tindall	9	9
10	Dawn Piepenbrink / Nick Castaneda	10	10
11	Erin Moorad / Richard Gillam	11	11
12	Brie Teaboldt / John Zimmerman IV	12	12
WD	Stephanie Woodman / Jeff Myers	13	

=== Ice dancing ===
Rank	Name	CD1	CD2	OD	FD
1	Renée Roca / Gorsha Sur	1	1	1	1
2	Elizabeth Punsalan / Jerod Swallow	2	2	2	2
3	Amy Webster / Ron Kravette	3	3	4	3
4	Kate Robinson / Peter Breen	4	4	3	4
5	Tamara Kuchiki / Neale Smull	6	5	5	5
6	Elizabeth Buhl / Augustine DiBella	5	6	6	6
7	Julia Bikbova / Robert Peal	7	7	7	8
8	Cheryl Demkowski / Gregory Maddalone	8	9	9	7
9	Christine Fitzgerald / Mark Fitzgerald	9	8	8	9
10	Laura Gayton / Oleg Fediukov	11	11	11	10
11	Debbie Koegel / Michael Sklutovsky	10	10	10	11
12	Sian Matthews / Yovanny Durango	12	12	12	12
13	Hillary Tompkins / Garrett Swasey	13	13	13	13
WD	Wendy Millette / Jason Tebo				

== Junior results ==
=== Men ===
Rank	Name	SP	FS
1	Matthew Kessinger	3	1
2	Trifun Zivanovic	1	2
3	Ryan Jahnke	2	4
4	Derrick Delmore	7	3
5	Timothy Goebel	6	5
6	Eric Bohnstedt	4	6
7	Dwayne Parker	5	7
8	Pete St. Germaine	9	8
9	Jeff Tilley	8	9
10	Eddie Gornik	10	11
11	Robert Schupp	13	10
12	John Wagner	12	12
13	Bert Cording	11	14
14	Don Baldwin	14	13

=== Ladies ===
Vogel won gold after placing first in both segments. In the free skating, six of nine judges placed Vogel first and two voted for Lipinski.

Rank	Name	SP	FS
1	Sydne Vogel	1	1
2	Tara Lipinski	2	2
3	Brittney McConn	3	3
4	Amy D'Entremont	4	4
5	Angela Nikodinov	6	5
6	Serena Phillips	5	6
7	Amanda Ward	7	7
8	Jenni Tew	8	8
9	Diana Miro	9	10
10	Cohen Duncan	14	9
11	Dena Derland	11	11
12	Emily Freedman	12	12
13	Bethany Quintin	10	13
14	Anikka Gill	13	14
15	Heather Johnson	15	15

=== Pairs ===
Rank	Name	SP	FS
1	Danielle Hartsell / Steve Hartsell	1	1
2	Erin Elbe / Jeffrey Weiss	3	3
3	Nicole Perry / Paul Dulebohn	7	2
4	Melanie Lambert / Fred Palascak	2	5
5	Anne MacWilliams / Philip Dulebohn	6	4
6	Katie Tobin / James Peterson	4	6
7	Natalie Vlandis / Jered Guzman	5	7
8	Celina Taylor / Mel Chapman	8	8
9	Jacki Davison / J. Paul Binnebose	9	9
10	Whitney Gaynor / David Delago	12	10
11	Emily Pirronello / Brent Echols	11	11
12	Sarah Booth / Matthew Buttrey	14	12
13	Katie Barnhart / Charles Bernhard	10	14
14	Kelly Peterman / Matthew Stuart	13	13

=== Ice dancing ===
Rank	Name	CD1	CD2	OD	FD
1	Eve Chalom / Mathew Gates	1	1	1	1
2	Kristina Feliciano / Alex Jacoby	3	2	2	2
3	Jessica Joseph / Charles Butler	2	3	3	3
4	Dawn Ponte / Paul Frey	4	4	4	4
5	Jamie Coffey / Kurt Dreger	5	5	5	5
6	Azumi Sagara / Jonathan Magalnick	6	6	6	6
7	Stephanie Crawford / D.J. Gray	7	7	7	7
8	Shannon Simon / Jason Simon	8	8	8	8
9	Jenny Dahlen / Sergei Lihachov	9	9	9	9
10	Tara Eve Modlin / Marc Fenczak	12	12	11	10
11	Elizabeth Hill / Richard Peal	11	11	10	11
WD	Celeste Treadwell / Shawn Gelise	10	10		

== Novice results ==
=== Men ===
Rank	Name	SP	FS
1	James Yoo	2	3
2	Justin Dillon	8	1
3	Joe Knazek	6	2
4	Scott Smith	1	5
5	Jonathan Keen	4	6
6	Braden Overett	9	4
7	Josiah Modes	5	7
8	Matt Savoie	3	8
9	Everett Weiss	7	9
10	Amir Ganaba	12	10
11	David Recchia	11	11
12	Joshua Figurido	10	12

=== Ladies ===
Rank	Name	SP	FS
1	Erin Sutton	2	1
2	Rhea Sy	1	3
3	Shelby Lyons	5	2
4	Molly Ziolkowski	4	4
5	Kristine Nishimura	3	7
6	Tara Macelko	11	5
7	Andrea Gardiner	10	6
8	Aya Yamada	9	8
9	Alissa Cline	7	10
10	Amy Evidente	12	9
11	Sarah DelValle	8	11
12	Kendra Kent	6	12

=== Pairs ===
Rank	Name	SP	FS
1	Tiffany Stiegler / Johnnie Stiegler	1	1
2	Heather Allebach / Matthew Evers	3	2
3	Lisa Weitzman / Mark Weitzman	4	3
4	Harmonie Yoder / Craig Joeright	6	4
5	Elizabeth Wilcut / Brian Boissonneault	2	6
6	Nicole Purdy / Joshua Modes	5	5
7	Alissa Cline / Kelby Renfro	8	7
8	Amy Wiseley / Jason Heffron	9	8
9	Lauren Carpenter / Brad Russi	7	9
10	Mackenzie Baltz / Kevin Garrett	11	10
11	Carissa Guild / Andrew Muldoon	10	11
12	Rebecca Erb / Joel Vinson	12	12

=== Ice dancing ===
Rank	Name	CD1	CD2	CD3	FD
1	Naomi Lang / John Lee	1	2	2	1
2	Christie Moxley / Tom Gaasbeck	2	1	1	2
3	Kerrie O'Donnell / [Brandon Forsyth]	3	3	3	3
4	Margot Contois / Raphael Lieb	4	4	4	4
5	Kristin Fraser / Peter Kongkasem	5	6	5	6
6	Melissa Gregory / James Shuford	11	6	6	3
7	Karen Ferrara / Colin Ward	8	7	7	7
8	Susanna Stapleford / VincentVanVliet	6	8	9	9
9	Elizabeth Philpot / Nick Hart	12	12	11	8
10	Cerise Henzes / David Gratta	9	9	12	10
11	Annalise Swanson / James Swanson	7	11	8	12
12	Erica Vance / Brandon Jellison	10	10	10	11
