= 1991 Skate America =

- Season: 1991–92
- Location: Oakland, California
- Host: U.S. Figure Skating
- Venue: Oakland Coliseum Arena

Champions
- Men's singles: (United States) Christopher Bowman
- Ladies' singles: (United States) Tonya Harding
- Pairs: (United States) Calla Urbanski / Rocky Marval
- Ice dance: (Soviet Union) Tatiana Navka / Samvel Gezalian
- Previous: 1990 Skate America
- Next: 1992 Skate America

The 1991 Skate America was held at the Oakland Coliseum Arena in Oakland, California. Medals were awarded in the disciplines of men's singles, ladies' singles, pair skating, and ice dancing.

== Results ==
=== Men ===
Rank	Name	Nation
1	Christopher Bowman	United States
2	Petr Barna	Czechoslovakia
3	Todd Eldredge	United States
4	Michael Chack	United States
5	Éric Millot	France
6	Viacheslav Zagorodniuk	Soviet Union
7	Steven Cousins	United Kingdom
8	Mirko Eichhorn	Germany
9	Fumihiro Oikawa	Japan
10	Michael Slipchuk	Canada

=== Ladies ===
Harding performed a triple axel in her short program and free skating. She became the first woman to land the triple axel in the short program in major international competition.

Rank	Name	Nation
1	Tonya Harding	United States
2	Kristi Yamaguchi	United States
3	Surya Bonaly	France
4	Chen Lu	China
5	Natalia Gorbenko	Soviet Union
6	Tisha Walker	United States
7	Patricia Neske	Germany
8	Junko Yaginuma	Japan
9	Josée Chouinard	Canada
10	Nathalie Krieg	Switzerland

=== Pairs ===
Rank	Name	Nation
1	Calla Urbanski / Rocky Marval	United States
2	Elena Nikonova / Nikolai Apter	Soviet Union
3	Peggy Schwarz / Alexander König	Germany
4	Elena Leonova / Sergey Petrovskiy	Soviet Union
5	Jennifer Huerlin / John Fredericksen	United States
6	Natasha Kuchiki / Todd Sand	United States
7	Marie-Claude Savard-Gagnon / Luc Bradet	Canada
8	Cheryl Peake / Andrew Naylor	United Kingdom
9	Penny Papaioannou / Raoul Leblanc	Canada
10	Anna Tabacchi / Massimo Salvade	Italy

=== Ice dancing ===
Rank	Name	Nation
1	Tatiana Navka / Samvel Gezalian	Soviet Union
2	Susanna Rahkamo / Petri Kokko	Finland
3	Dominique Yvon / Frédéric Palluel	France
4	Elizabeth Punsalan / Jerod Swallow	United States
5	Jacqueline Petr / Mark Janoschak	Canada
6	Rachel Mayer / Peter Breen	United States
7	Regina Woodward / Csaba Szentpéteri	Hungary
8	Anna Croci / Luca Mantovani	Italy
9	Beth Buhl / Neale Smull	United States
10	Ayako Higashino / Tatsuro Matsumura	Japan
