= Gorsha Sur =

Russian-American ice dancer

Personal information
- Other names: Georgi Sur
- Born: January 1, 1967 (age 59) Moscow, Russian SFSR, Soviet Union

Figure skating career
- Country: United States
- Retired: 1996
Medal record
Figure skating: Ice dancing
Representing United States
International
Bronze medal – third place	1995 Skate America	Ice dance
Bronze medal – third place	1994 Skate Canada	Ice dance
Bronze medal – third place	1993 Skate America	Ice dance
U.S. Championships
Silver medal – second place	1996 San Jose	Ice dance
Gold medal – first place	1995 Providence	Ice dance
Gold medal – first place	1993 Phoenix	Ice dance

Georgi "Gorsha" Sur (born January 1, 1967) is a former ice dancer who represented the United States and the Soviet Union. With Svetlana Liapina for the Soviet Union, he is a two-time World Junior medalist. With Renée Roca for the U.S., he is a two-time U.S. national champion (1993, 1995).

== Life and career ==
=== Partnership with Liapina ===
Early in his career, Sur competed in partnership with Svetlana Liapina. The two won bronze at the 1984 World Junior Championships in Sapporo, Japan. The following season, they were awarded silver behind Elena Krykanova / Evgeni Platov at the 1985 World Junior Championships in Colorado Springs, Colorado.

After moving up to the senior ranks, Liapina/Sur won silver at the 1986 Nebelhorn Trophy, 1987 NHK Trophy, and 1988 Skate America. They were awarded gold at the 1989 Winter Universiade. Due to the depth of the Soviet ice dancing field, the duo decided to leave amateur competition for professional skating.

=== Move to the United States ===
In January 1990, Sur was taking part in a month-long Russian All-Stars skating tour in the U.S., headlined by Jayne Torvill and Christopher Dean, when he defected to the U.S., on January 24, 1990. He was joined by Elena Krikanova, Igor Shpilband, Veronica Pershina and a tour official. The group moved in with Russian immigrants in Brooklyn and eventually pooled their money to rent a one-bedroom apartment. With Sur's funds running out, American friends put him in touch with the Detroit Skating Club where he was offered a coaching job.

=== Partnership with Roca ===
Belgian skater Jirina Ribbens advised Sur to contact Renée Roca if he was looking for a skating partner. Ribbens stated, "Of all the U.S. ice dancers, Renee's style is the most European. She has a classically elegant and dramatic flair, more like a ballerina than a ballroom dancer."

Roca/Sur worked together in Detroit for two weeks and were soon invited to audition for tour organizers and to compete at professional competitions. A year later, the International Skating Union changed its eligibility rules, allowing professional skaters to reinstate as amateurs to compete at the World Championships and Olympics; Sur convinced Roca to return to eligible competition.

The duo choreographed the free dance that Elizabeth Punsalan and Jerod Swallow used to win the 1991 U.S. Championships.

Roca/Sur began competing in the 1992–93 season. They were coached by Sandy Hess in Colorado Springs, Colorado. Roca and Sur won the 1993 U.S. national title. Roca and Sur hoped to win the United States' single berth to the ice dancing event at the 1994 Winter Olympics. To do so, the couple had to not only win the 1994 U.S. national title but also receive accelerated citizenship for Sur due to the Olympics' citizenship requirements.

A Republican Representative and Democratic Senator, both from Colorado, lent their support to speed up Sur's naturalization in Congress. It was argued that his case differed from other athletes because not speeding up the process would hurt an American citizen, Renee Roca. However, their efforts were stymied in late December 1993 when the United States Olympic Committee denied a request for a waiver to the requirement that athletes be citizens by the national championships. In addition, their main rivals for the Olympic spot, Punsalan and Swallow, were involved in a letter-writing campaign to Congress to attempt to prevent Sur from receiving expedited citizenship.

During a warm-up at the 1994 U.S. Championships, Roca was skating backward and collided with the team of Galit Chait and Maksim Sevostyanov, fracturing a bone in her left arm.

Two hours later, she returned from the hospital with her arm in a cast and decided to try to compete. They placed second to Punsalan and Swallow in the rhumba, however, Roca was unable to secure a firm grip with her left hand. The couple was ultimately forced to withdraw from the rest of the competition. Roca and Sur returned to competition the following season and defeated Punsalan and Swallow at the 1995 U.S. Championships to reclaim their national crown.

At the 1996 U.S. Championships, their fortunes reversed again and Roca and Sur placed second to Punsalan/Swallow. Roca and Sur retired from eligible competition at the end of the season. In 1997, Roca and Sur won the Word Professional Figure Skating Championship and went on to tour with Stars on Ice from 1997 until 2002.

On February 24, 2002, Roca and Sur performed at the Closing Ceremony of the XIX Olympic Winter Games in Salt Lake City, skating to "The Prayer" choreographed by Christopher Dean and sang live by Charlotte Church and Josh Groban as the Olympic cauldron was extinguished.

Sur has been credited as being the indirect cause of the Rent-A-Russian phenomenon in American skating, although he had moved to the United States with no intention of ever competing again.

=== Education and Work ===
Concurrently with his skating career, Sur worked as a coach and choreographer at the Broadmoor Word Arena and later at the Oakland Ice Center. In 2003, Sur was accepted to the University of California, Hastings College of the Law which he graduated with a Juris Doctor degree in 2006. The following year, Sur obtained a Master's degree in International Commercial Arbitration law from Stockholm University. He is a licensed Californian lawyer.

== Results ==
=== With Liapina for the Soviet Union ===
International
Event	83–84	84–85	85–86	86–87	87–88	88–89
NHK Trophy					2nd	
Skate America						2nd
Nebelhorn Trophy				2nd		
Prize of Moscow News			8th			
Winter Universiade				3rd		1st
International: Junior
World Junior Champ.	3rd	2nd				
National
Soviet Champ.			5th		5th	

=== With Roca for the United States ===
GP: Champions Series (Grand Prix)

International
Event	1992–93	1993–94	1994–95	1995–96
World Champ.	11th		10th	14th
GP Nations Cup				4th
GP Skate America				3rd
NHK Trophy			5th	
Skate America		3rd		
Skate Canada			3rd	
National
U.S. Champ.	1st		1st	2nd
