= Todd Reynolds =

Todd Reynolds may refer to:

- Todd Reynolds (musician), American violinist, composer, and conductor
- Todd Reynolds (figure skater) (1966–2023), American figure skater
