= World Professional Figure Skating Championships =

Figure skating competition

The World Professional Figure Skating Championships, often referred to as Landover, was an elite made-for-TV figure skating competition. It was created by Dick Button, a two-time Olympic gold medalist, through his production company Candid Productions. It usually took place in December. For most of its existence, it was an unsanctioned professional event, meaning that skaters who participated lost their eligibility to compete in the Winter Olympic Games and other "amateur" skating events controlled by the International Skating Union.

== History ==
The first professional championship was held in 1973 in Tokyo, Japan (aired in 1974 on ABC Sports) . Skaters competed in three disciplines: men's singles, ladies' singles, and pair skating. However the competition was not held again until 1980, when it moved to Landover, Maryland. It was held again from 1980 to 1982 as a two-team competition. In 1983 individual competition once again resumed alongside continued team competition. 1983 also marked the first year in which ice dancing was contested. Team competition was discontinued in 1986. The last professional championship was held in 2000.

The professional championships were held in Landover, Maryland, every year until 1997, when it moved to the MCI Center in Washington, D.C. Beginning in 1990, the championship started taking the name of its sponsor. Thus the 1990 competition was called the "NutraSweet World Professional Championships". Other sponsors included Durasoft Colors, Equal, Metabolife, and Hallmark.

In 1998, the competition was sanctioned by the International Skating Union (ISU) as an "international open" or pro-am event. Because the ISU restricts the use of the title "Championships" to refer to ISU Championship events, that year the event was formally known simply as the "Equal Sweetener World Pro".

The technical content of performances was generally lower than in ISU events. Dick Button said: "In the amateur world, they count your triple jumps, and if you don't do enough they forget about your other skating. We do not make our competitors prove their merit. We let them present creative programs with as many or as few triple jumps as they wish."

In 1999, Button's Candid Productions was acquired by SFX, which was in turn acquired by Clear Channel Communications a year later. At the same time, public interest in professional skating competitions was declining, more elite skaters were choosing to retain their competition eligibility by participating only in sanctioned events, and networks were shifting towards a time-buy model which made skating events less lucrative for producers. All of these factors contributed to the competition's demise after the 2000 event.

In 2001, a successor pro competition produced by IMG under the name "Hallmark Skater's Championship" was held on the usual December date at the MCI Center. In 2002 the IMG-produced event was held again under that name, this time in Columbus, Ohio, as a sanctioned pro-am competition. This competition also ceased to be held.

In 2009 Skyeyes International Ltd purchased the rights of the World Professional Figure Skating Championships and transformed them into an international trademark with the goal to unify criteria between both events held prior.

Simultaneously the International Professional Skating Union (IPSU) under the same umbrella was being developed.

In 2016 the French company Agence Combes purchased the rights of the World Professional Figure Skating Championships.

== Professional champions ==
Year	Team	Men's singles	Ladies' singles	Pair skating	Ice dancing
1973	–	Ronnie Robertson	Janet Lynn	Belousova / Protopopov	–
1980	See	–	–	–	–
1981	"All Stars"	–	–	–	–
1982	"Pro Stars"	–	–	–	–
1983	See	Charles Tickner	Janet Lynn	Belousova / Protopopov	Wighton / Dowding
1984	See	Scott Hamilton	Dorothy Hamill	Underhill / Martini	Torvill / Dean
1985	See	Robin Cousins	Dorothy Hamill	Babilonia / Gardner	Torvill / Dean
1986	–	Scott Hamilton	Dorothy Hamill	Underhill / Martini	Fox / Dalley
1987	–	Robin Cousins	Dorothy Hamill	Underhill / Martini	Fox / Dalley
1988	–	Gary Beacom	Debi Thomas	Underhill / Martini	Blumberg / Seibert
1989	–	Brian Boitano	Debi Thomas	Underhill / Martini	Wilson / McCall
1990	–	Brian Boitano	Denise Biellmann	Underhill / Martini	Torvill / Dean
1991	–	Brian Boitano	Debi Thomas	Gordeeva / Grinkov	Bestemianova / Bukin
1992	–	Brian Boitano	Kristi Yamaguchi	Gordeeva / Grinkov	Annenko / Sretenski
1993	–	Paul Wylie	Midori Ito	Underhill / Martini	Annenko / Sretenski
1994	–	Brian Boitano	Kristi Yamaguchi	Gordeeva / Grinkov	Usova / Zhulin
1995	–	Kurt Browning	Yuka Sato	Kovarikova / Novotny	Torvill / Dean
1996	–	Kurt Browning	Kristi Yamaguchi	Bechke / Petrov	Torvill / Dean
1997	–	Kurt Browning	Kristi Yamaguchi	Kovarikova / Novotny	Roca / Sur
1998	–	Alexei Yagudin	Michelle Kwan	Kazakova / Dmitriev	Usova / Platov
1999	–	Alexei Urmanov	Tara Lipinski	Leonova / Khvalko	Punsalan / Swallow
2000	–	Philippe Candeloro	Yuka Sato	Leonova / Khvalko	Punsalan / Swallow
2001	–	Ilia Kulik	Yuka Sato	Kazakova / Dmitriev	Krylova / Ovsyannikov
2002	–	Alexei Yagudin	Yuka Sato	Salé / Pelletier	Anissina / Peizerat

== Jaca competition ==
An unrelated professional skating competition known by the same name in English was held for many years in Jaca, Spain. Its official name in Spanish was Campeonatos del Mundo de Patinaje Artístico Professional sobre Hielo. The forerunner of this event was an open professional championship for show skaters dating back to at least the 1930s that was held in England, initially under the auspices of the National Ice Skating Association of Great Britain, and later organized by the Imperial Professional Skaters Association. The event moved to Jaca with the sponsorship of the International Professional Skaters Union. During the 1980s it was a prestigious event with wide television coverage in Europe. Past winners of this event include Denise Biellmann, Robert Wagenhoffer, Gary Beacom, Scott Williams, Pierre Panayi and Lorna Brown.
