= World Professional Championships =

The World Professional Championships may refer to:

- World Professional Figure Skating Championships
- World Professional Championships, the 1954–1962 name of the U.S. Pro Tennis Championships
