= Renée Roca =

American ice dancer and choreographer (born 1963)

Personal information
- Born: May 18, 1963 (age 63) Rochester, New York, U.S.

Figure skating career
- Country: United States
- Retired: 1996
Medal record
Ice Dance Figure Skating
Representing United States
International
Bronze medal – third place	1995 Skate America	Ice dance
Bronze medal – third place	1994 Skate Canada	Ice dance
Bronze medal – third place	1993 Skate America	Ice dance
Gold medal – first place	1985 Skate America	Ice dance
Gold medal – first place	1985 Skate Canada	Ice dance
United States National Championships
Silver medal – second place	1996 San Jose	Ice dance
Gold medal – first place	1995 Providence	Ice dance
Gold medal – first place	1993 Phoenix	Ice dance
Silver medal – second place	1987 Tacoma	Ice dance
Gold medal – first place	1986 Uniondale	Ice dance
Silver medal – second place	1985 Kansas City	Ice dance

Renée Roca (born May 18, 1963) is an American ice dancer and choreographer. She is a three-time U.S. national champion with different partners. Competing with partner Donald Adair, she is the 1986 U.S. national champion. She later teamed up with Russian skater Gorsha Sur, with whom she is the 1993 and 1995 U.S. national champion.

== Career ==
Early in her career, Roca competed with Andrew Ouellette. She later teamed up with Donald Adair. Their most successful season was 1985–86, in which they won 1985 Skate Canada International, 1985 Skate America and the 1986 U.S. national title. She also achieved her highest World placement, 6th at the 1986 World Championships. The following season, they won the U.S. silver medal. He decided to retire ten days before the 1987 World Championships, stunning Roca who had hoped to qualify for the 1988 Winter Olympics.

After that partnership ended, Judy Blumberg and Brian Boitano helped pair Roca with Jim Yorke. Roca and Yorke placed 4th at the 1988 U.S. Championships. They withdrew from the 1989 event.

Roca left competition and began working as a skating choreographer. She choreographed the free program Jill Trenary used to win the 1990 World Championships.

In early 1990, Russian skater Gorsha Sur, who had defected to the U.S. the previous month, was advised to contact Roca by Belgian skater, Jirina Ribbens. Ribbens noted, "Of all the U.S. ice dancers, Renee's style is the most European. She has a classically elegant and dramatic flair, more like a ballerina than a ballroom dancer." Roca and Sur worked together in Detroit for two weeks and were soon invited to audition for tour organizers and to compete at professional competitions. A year later, the International Skating Union changed its eligibility rules, allowing professional skaters to reinstate as amateurs to compete at the World Championships and Olympics; Sur convinced Roca to return to eligible competition.

The pair choreographed for Elizabeth Punsalan and Jerod Swallow the free dance they used to win the 1991 U.S. Championships.

Roca began competing with Sur in the 1992–93 season. They were coached by Sandy Hess in Colorado Springs, Colorado. Roca and Sur won the 1993 U.S. national title.

Roca and Sur hoped to win the United States' single berth to the ice dancing event at the 1994 Winter Olympics. To do so, the couple had to not only win the 1994 U.S. national title but also receive accelerated citizenship for Sur due to the Olympics' citizenship requirements. A Republican Representative and Democratic Senator, both from Colorado, lent their support to speed up Sur's naturalization in Congress. It was argued that his case differed from other athletes because not speeding up the process would hurt an American citizen, Renee Roca. However, their efforts were stymied in late December 1993 when the United States Olympic Committee denied a request for a waiver to the requirement that athletes be citizens by the national championships. In addition, their main rivals for the Olympic spot, Punsalan and Swallow, were involved in a letter-writing campaign to Congress to prevent Sur from receiving expedited citizenship.

During a warm-up at the 1994 U.S. Championships, Roca was skating backward and collided with the team of Galit Chait and Maksim Sevostyanov, fracturing a bone in her left arm. Two hours later, she returned from the hospital with her arm in a cast and decided to try to compete. They placed second to Punsalan and Swallow in the rhumba, however, Roca was unable to secure a firm grip with her left hand. The couple was ultimately forced to withdraw from the rest of the competition.

Roca and Sur returned to competition the following season and defeated Punsalan and Swallow at the 1995 U.S. Championships to reclaim their national crown.

At the 1996 U.S. Championships, their fortunes reversed again and Roca and Sur placed second to Punsalan and Swallow. Roca and Sur retired from eligible competition at the end of the season and toured with Stars on Ice.

Roca also choreographed the short program that Nicole Bobek used when she placed first at the 1995 Worlds in that segment and the program Alissa Czisny used to become 2011 National Champion and 2010–2011 Grand Prix Final Champion. Roca was a choreographer on the television show Skating with Celebrities.

== Programs ==
With Sur

Season	Original dance	Figure skating	Exhibition
			Beethoven Sonata No. 9; Maria; Bach Adagio; Somethin' Else by Little Richard, Tanya Tucker; Everything Must Change by Nina Simone; I'll Be Seeing You by Mel Tormé
1997–98			If You Go Away by Neil Diamond
1995–96			
1994–95	Quickstep	House of the Rising Sun	
1993–94		Fever; Harlem Nocturne; Red Blues	
1992–93		Summertimes	

== Results ==
GP: Champions Series (Grand Prix)

=== With Sur ===
International
Event	1992–93	1993–94	1994–95	1995–96
World Champ.	11th		10th	14th
GP Nations Cup				4th
GP Skate America				3rd
NHK Trophy			5th	
Skate America		3rd		
Skate Canada			3rd	
National
U.S. Champ.	1st		1st	2nd

=== With Yorke ===
International
Event	1987–88	1988–89
Prague Skate	1st	
Skate America		3rd
National
U.S. Championships	4th	WD
Eastern Sectionals	1st	
WD = Withdrew

=== With Adair ===
International
Event	81-82	82–83	83–84	84–85	85–86	86–87
World Champ.				11th	6th	
Skate America					1st	
Skate Canada					1st	
NHK Trophy				5th		
National
U.S. Champ.	6th	4th	4th	2nd	1st	2nd

=== With Ouellette ===
International
Event	1979–80
World Junior Championships	3rd
