= Yuka Sato =

Japanese figure skater (born 1973)

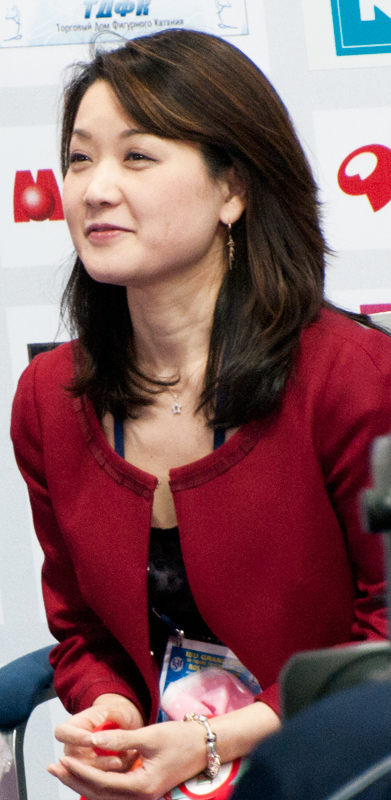
- Sato in 2011.

Personal information
- Born: February 14, 1973 (age 53) Tokyo, Japan
- Height: 1.52 m (5 ft 0 in)

Figure skating career
- Country: Japan
- Skating club: Detroit Skating Club
- Retired: 1994
Medal record
Ladies' figure skating
Representing Japan
World Championships
| Gold medal – first place | 1994 Chiba | Ladies' singles |
World Junior Championships
| Gold medal – first place | 1990 Colorado Springs | Ladies' singles |

Japanese name
- Kanji: 佐藤 有香
- Kana: さとう ゆか
Transcriptions
- Romanization: Satō Yuka

Yuka Sato (佐藤 有香, Satō Yuka; born February 14, 1973) is a Japanese former competitive figure skater and choreographer. She is the 1994 World champion, the 1990 World Junior champion and the 1993 & 1994 Japanese national champion. She placed 7th at the 1992 Winter Olympics and 5th at the 1994 Winter Olympics.

== Personal life ==
Yuka Sato was born in Tokyo to figure skating parents. Her father, Nobuo Sato, competed at the 1960 Winter Olympics and 1964 Winter Olympics while her mother, Kumiko Okawa, competed in the 1964 Winter Olympics and 1968 Winter Olympics. Her parents, as of 2011, live near Yokohama.

Sato is a graduate of Hosei University. She was married to fellow figure skater Jason Dungjen.

== Career ==
=== Eligible career ===
In the 1988–89 season, Yuka Sato won the Japanese junior title to qualify for the 1989 World Junior Championships, where she placed 10th. She also qualified for Japan's senior championships, where she won the bronze medal behind Midori Ito and Junko Yaginuma. Sato was taught by her parents in Japan until she was 16. Around 1989, she moved to Canada and joined Peter Dunfield, who coached her for the next five years.

In the 1989–90 season, Sato was the Japanese junior champion for the second year in a row and the silver medalist on the senior level. She assigned to the World Junior Championships, where she won gold, and to the 1990 World Championships, where she placed 14th.

In the 1990–91 season, Sato placed fifth at the 1990 NHK Trophy and at the 1990 Nations Cup.

In the 1991–92 season, Sato won the bronze medal at the 1992 Skate America and her second silver medal at the Japanese Championships. She was sent to the 1992 Winter Olympics, where she placed seventh, and the 1992 World Championships, where she finished eighth.

In the 1992–93 season, Sato defeated Nancy Kerrigan and Chen Lu to win the 1992 Skate America. She won the silver medal at the 1992 NHK Trophy, gold at the Prague Skate, and gold at the Japanese Championships. She placed fourth at the 1993 World Championships.

In the 1993–94 season, Sato won the bronze medal at the 1993 NHK Trophy and placed sixth at the pre-Olympic Piruetten competition in Norway. She won her second Japanese national title that season to qualify for the 1994 Winter Olympics and the 1994 World Championships. At the Olympics, she popped an intended triple Lutz in the short program and placed seventh in that segment of the competition. She completed six triple jumps in the free skate and finished fifth overall.

All of the Olympic medalists withdrew from the 1994 World Championships, which were held in Japan. She placed first after the technical program, with Surya Bonaly and Josee Chouinard in second and third, respectively. In the free skate, she was beaten by Bonaly 8–1 in the technical mark but won the presentation mark 8–1, and became the World champion by a 5–4 vote between the judges.

=== Later career ===
Following her win at the 1994 World Championships, Sato retired from amateur skating and began performing professionally in ice shows, including Stars on Ice. She won the 1995, 2000, 2001 and 2002 World Professional Championships and placed second at that competition in 1996 and 1998. Sato also performed as a pair skater with Jason Dungjen. She is credited as a stunt performer in the 2007 figure skating comedy motion picture Blades of Glory.

Sato has worked as a sports commentator for Japanese television. She commentated for NHK during the 2006 Winter Olympics, including the broadcast of Shizuka Arakawa's winning performance. She is a coach and choreographer at the Detroit Skating Club in Bloomfield Hills, Michigan. She has coached Jeremy Abbott, Alissa Czisny, and Valentina Marchei. In addition to her coaching career she has also choreographed for several skaters. Her past and current clients include:

- (United States) Jeremy Abbott
- (United States) Alissa Czisny
- (Italy) Valentina Marchei
- (Japan) Mai Mihara
- (Japan) Wakaba Higuchi
- (Japan) Shun Sato
- (Canada) Joannie Rochette
- (Japan) Takahiko Kozuka
- (China) Yan Han
- (United States) Vincent Zhou
- (Japan) Kaori Sakamoto

== Competitive highlights ==
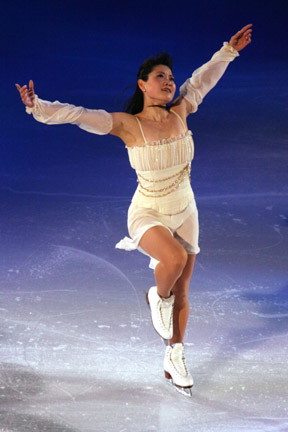
Yuka Sato in 2008

International
| Event | 1987–88 | 1988–89 | 1989–90 | 1990–91 | 1991–92 | 1992–93 | 1993–94 |
|---|---|---|---|---|---|---|---|
| Olympics | | | | | 7th | | 5th |
| Worlds | | | 14th | | 8th | 4th | 1st |
| Skate America | | | | | | 1st | |
| Skate Canada | | | | 4th | 7th | | |
| Nations Cup | | | | 5th | | | |
| NHK Trophy | | | | 5th | | 3rd | 2nd |
| Prague Skate | | | | | | 1st | |
| Piruetten | | | | | | | 6th |
International: Junior
| Junior Worlds | | 10th | 1st | | | | |
National
| Japan Champ. | 3rd | 3rd | 2nd | | 2nd | 1st | 1st |
| Japan Jr. Champ. | | 1st | 1st | | | | |
