= Rocky Marval =

American pair skater (born 1965)

Personal information
- Full name: Rocco Marvaldi
- Born: November 11, 1965 (age 60) Trenton, New Jersey, U.S.
- Height: 5 ft 9 in (1.75 m)

Figure skating career
- Country: United States
- Retired: 1994

Rocco Marvaldi (born November 11, 1965), known professionally as Rocky Marval, is an American former pair skater. With Calla Urbanski, he is the 1991 Skate America champion, the 1992 NHK Trophy bronze medalist, and a two-time U.S. national champion (1992–1993). They represented the United States at the 1992 Winter Olympics and finished tenth.

== Personal life ==
Marval worked as a truck driver during his skating career, having established a small trucking company with his brother in the early 1980s. He married Canadian pair skater Isabelle Brasseur. Their daughter, Gabriella Marvaldi, is the 2012 U.S. juvenile pairs champion, with partner Kyle Hogeboom.

== Career ==
Marval teamed up with Calla Urbanski in 1990. They were coached by Ronald Ludington in Wilmington, Delaware. The media dubbed the pair "The Waitress and the Truck Driver" because of their occupations. In the 1991–92 season, Urbanski/Marval won gold at the 1991 Skate America and at the 1992 U.S. Championships. They were named in the U.S. team to the 1992 Winter Olympics in Albertville, France and finished tenth. Both developed chest colds at the event and waited a day for medication because the approved type had initially run out. The pair placed seventh in the final event of the season, the 1992 World Championships.

In June 1992, Urbanski and Marval announced the end of their partnership. Both arranged tryouts with other skaters — Urbanski with Scott Kurttila and Marval with Natasha Kuchiki — but the two decided to reunite in late July. They competed together for one more season, winning bronze at the 1992 NHK Trophy and their second U.S. national title.

Marval teamed up with Kuchiki in late 1993. They finished fourth at the 1994 U.S. Championships, missing the 1994 Olympic team. Marval then reunited with Urbanski and turned professional. In 1998, the pair placed third at the World Professional Championships.

Marval is the director of skating at the Igloo Ice Rink in Mount Laurel, New Jersey.

== Results ==
=== With Maria Lako ===
Event	1989	1990
U.S. Championships	11th	7th

=== With Calla Urbanski ===
International
Event	1990–91	1991–92	1992–93
Winter Olympics		10th	
World Championships	9th	7th	8th
Skate America	7th	1st	4th
International de Paris		4th	
NHK Trophy			3rd
Nations Cup		4th	
National
U.S. Championships	2nd	1st	1st

=== With Natasha Kuchiki ===
Event	1994
U.S. Championships	4th

=== Professional ===
- 1994 Challenge of Champions: 4
- 1994 Goodwill Games: 6
- 1994 U.S. Open: 3
- 1995 Challenge of Champions: 2
- 1995 Legends Championships: 4
- 1995 Rider's Skating Championship: 4
- 1996 Canadian Professional Championships: 4
- 1996 Masters Miko: 3
- 1996 The Professional Championships: 5
- 1996 U.S. Professional Championships: 3
- 1997 Challenge of Champions: WD
- 1998 World Professional Championships: 3
