= Katie Wood =

American former figure skater

Katie Wood is an American former figure skater who competed in pairs. While performing with partner Todd Reynolds at an exhibition in Odesa, Ukraine on December 2, 1990, she suffered a fall which resulted in a fractured skull and the loss of hearing in her right ear. After recovering from the injury, she returned to skating with partner Joel McKeever, and the pair finished fourth at the United States Figure Skating Championships in 1993 United States Figure Skating Championships. She retired from competition a few months later.
