= Calla Urbanski =

American pair skater (born 1960)

Personal information
- Full name: Calla Vita Urbanski-Petka
- Born: June 26, 1960 (age 66) Chicago, Illinois, U.S.
- Height: 4 ft 11 in (1.50 m)

Figure skating career
- Country: United States
- Retired: 1994

Calla Vita Urbanski-Petka (born June 26, 1960) is an American former pair skater. With Rocky Marval, she is the 1991 Skate America champion, the 1992 NHK Trophy bronze medalist, and a two-time U.S. national champion (1992–1993). They represented the United States at the 1992 Winter Olympics and finished tenth.

== Personal life ==
Urbanski was raised in Skokie, Illinois, the daughter of a radio engineer and a hair stylist. She worked double shifts as a waitress and barmaid during her skating career.

== Career ==
Competing with Michael Blicharski, Urbanski placed 6th at the 1988 U.S. Championships. Their partnership ended when he decided to join an ice show due to financial problems. She then competed two seasons with Mark Naylor but they split after finishing seventh at the 1990 Goodwill Games.

Urbanski teamed up with Rocky Marval in 1990. They were coached by Ronald Ludington in Wilmington, Delaware. The media dubbed the pair "The Waitress and the Truck Driver" because of their occupations. In the 1991–92 season, Urbanski/Marval won gold at the 1991 Skate America and at the 1992 U.S. Championships. They were named in the U.S. team to the 1992 Winter Olympics in Albertville, France and finished tenth. Both developed chest colds at the event and waited a day for medication because the approved type had initially run out. The pair placed seventh in the final event of the season, the 1992 World Championships.

In June 1992, Urbanski and Marval announced the end of their partnership. Both arranged tryouts with other skaters — Urbanski with Scott Kurttila and Marval with Natasha Kuchiki — but the two decided to reunite in late July. They competed together for one more season, winning bronze at the 1992 NHK Trophy and their second U.S. national title.

Urbanski then teamed up with Joseph Mero. After the pair finished seventh at the 1994 U.S. Championships, she reunited with Marval and turned professional, enjoying several successful years in the mid-1990s. She coached in Wilmington, Delaware and then in Florida.

== Results ==
=== With Blicharski ===
International
Event	1986–87	1987–88
Winter Universiade	3rd	
National
U.S. Championships		6th

=== With Naylor ===
International
Event	1988–89	1989–90
Nations Cup		3rd
Goodwill Games		7th
National
U.S. Championships	5th	4th

=== With Marval ===
International
Event	1990–91	1991–92	1992–93
Winter Olympics		10th	
World Championships	9th	7th	8th
Skate America	7th	1st	4th
International de Paris		4th	
NHK Trophy			3rd
Nations Cup		4th	
National
U.S. Championships	2nd	1st	1st

=== With Mero ===
National
Event	1993–94
U.S. Championships	7th
Eastern Sectionals	1st

=== Professional ===
(with Marval)

- 1994 Challenge of Champions: 4
- 1994 Goodwill Games: 6
- 1994 U.S. Open: 3
- 1995 Challenge of Champions: 2
- 1995 Legends Championships: 4
- 1995 Rider's Skating Championship: 4
- 1996 Canadian Professional Championships: 4
- 1996 Masters Miko: 3
- 1996 The Professional Championships: 5
- 1996 U.S. Professional Championships: 3
- 1997 Challenge of Champions: WD
- 1998 World Professional Championships: 3
