= Christopher Bowman =

American figure skater (1967–2008)

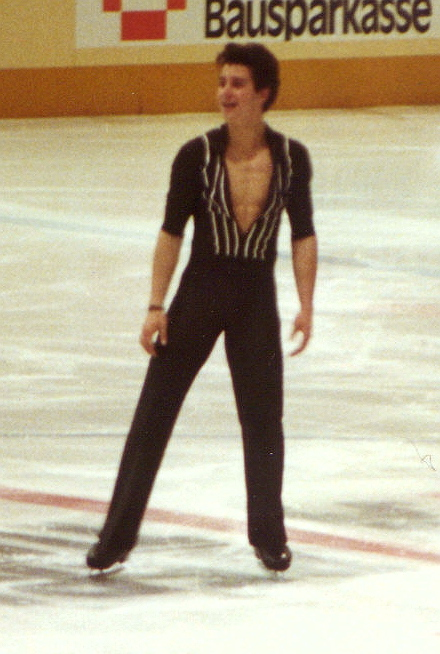
- Bowman in 1989

Personal information
- Full name: Christopher Nicol Bowman
- Born: March 30, 1967 Hollywood, California, United States
- Died: January 10, 2008 (aged 40) North Hills, Los Angeles, California, U.S.
- Height: 5 ft 10 in (178 cm)

Figure skating career
- Country: United States
- Discipline: Men's singles
- Retired: 1992
Medal record
Men's figure skating
Representing United States
World Championships
Silver medal – second place	1989 Paris	Men's singles
Bronze medal – third place	1990 Halifax	Men's singles
World Junior Championships
Gold medal – first place	1983 Sarajevo	Men's singles

Christopher Nicol Bowman (March 30, 1967 – January 10, 2008) was an American figure skater. He was a two-time World medalist (silver in 1989, bronze in 1990), the 1983 World Junior champion, and a two-time U.S. national champion. He competed in two Olympic Winter Games, placing 7th in 1988 and 4th in 1992.

== Early years ==
Bowman was born in Hollywood, California. In his childhood, he appeared in commercials and two episodes of the TV series Little House on the Prairie.

== Career ==
In 1983, Bowman won the World Junior Championships and the U.S. national junior title.

Bowman withdrew from the 1986 U.S. Championships after finishing second in the short program; he had a separation between his right tibia and fibula. The following season, he took the silver medal at U.S. nationals and was assigned to his first senior World Championships, finishing 7th.

In 1988, Bowman won the bronze medal at the U.S. Championships and was sent to his first Olympics, where he finished 7th. He then placed 5th at the 1988 World Championships.

Bowman's left shin was cut in an accident with another skater in December 1988. He won his first senior U.S. national title in 1989. He then won his first World medal, silver, at the 1989 World Championships.

Bowman withdrew from the 1990 U.S. Championships but received a berth to the 1990 World Championships where he took the bronze medal. After the Goodwill Games, he parted ways with Frank Carroll, who had coached him for eighteen years. Toller Cranston and Ellen Burka were his next coaches, followed by John Nicks. Bowman won his second national title in 1992. He was sent to his second Olympics and placed 4th.

In Inside Edge by Christine Brennan, Bowman admitted to having had a $950 a day cocaine habit during his eligible career, and that he had checked into the Betty Ford Center before the 1988 Olympic Games. Cranston also later described Bowman's drug problems in his book Zero Tollerance.

He was known as "Bowman the Showman" for his crowd-pleasing performances. Brian Boitano, the 1988 Olympic champion, told the Chicago Tribune: "If I had to pick the three most talented skaters of all time, I would pick Christopher as one. He had natural charisma, natural athleticism, he could turn on a crowd in a matter of seconds and he always seemed so relaxed about it." Bowman's competitive programs were usually set to classical music, with choreography, as figure skater writer and historian Ellyn Kestnbaum stated, that "on most other skaters would emphasize the aesthetic and dramatic qualities of the movement". Kestnbaum states that Bowman would instead deliberately overplay facial expressions and emotional gestures in his programs, "thus drawing attention to the constructedness of the emotions he was conveying", which made his performances humorous. He would also, from time to time, interrupt his skating to point or to "mug directly at a spectator or into a television camera that happened to be along his path". Kestnbaum reports that at 1991 Skate America, Bowman "further breached aesthetic distance" by leaning over the barrier and grabbing the leg of an acquaintance in the first row. He won the competition; in his exhibition skate afterwards, he "frustrated the spectators' gaze even further" when in the middle of the performance, he removed his jacket and draped it over the lens of the camera televising the event.

Bowman retired from competitive skating after the 1992 World Championships and toured with Ice Capades the following year. He left the tour in 1993 when Dorothy Hamill purchased Ice Capades. For some years thereafter, Bowman worked as a skating coach, first in Massachusetts and then in the Detroit area, where he lived from 1995 until 2007, and as a skating commentator. Prior to his death, he had returned to southern California to make a comeback in acting, with a role as an assistant coach in Down and Distance.

== Personal life and death ==
Bowman was divorced from skating coach Annette Bowman Jasinkiewicz with whom he had a daughter, Bianca (b. 1997).

Bowman was pronounced dead on January 10, 2008, at 12:06 p.m. after being found in a motel in the North Hills area of Los Angeles. He was 40 years old. The Los Angeles County Coroner determined that Bowman died from an accidental drug overdose containing alcohol, marijuana, cocaine and prescription drugs.

== Competitive highlights ==
International
Event	82–83	83–84	84–85	85–86	86–87	87–88	88–89	89–90	90–91	91–92
Olympics						7th				4th
Worlds					7th	5th	2nd	3rd	5th	4th
Goodwill Games									6th	
Fujifilm Trophy						1st				
Inter. de Paris									1st	
NHK Trophy						1st				
Skate America				4th			1st	1st	2nd	1st
Skate Canada					2nd					
Moscow News				4th						
St. Ivel				3rd			2nd			
International: Junior
Junior Worlds	1st									
National
U.S. Champ.	1st J	9th	4th	WD	2nd	3rd	1st	WD	2nd	1st
J = Junior level; WD = Withdrew
