= Elizabeth Punsalan =

American ice dancer

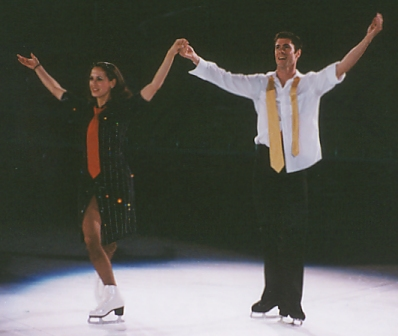
- Punsalan and Swallow in 2002.

Personal information
- Other names: Elizabeth Swallow
- Born: January 9, 1971 (age 55) Syracuse, New York, U.S.
- Height: 5 ft 5 in (1.65 m)

Figure skating career
- Country: United States
- Skating club: Detroit Skating Club
- Retired: 1998

Elizabeth Punsalan or Swallow (born January 9, 1971) is an American former competitive ice dancer. With her husband Jerod Swallow, she is a five-time U.S. national champion, two-time Skate America champion, and competed twice in the Winter Olympics.

== Personal life ==
Elizabeth Punsalan was born in Syracuse, New York. Her father, Ernesto, moved from the Philippines to the United States as a medical student and became a surgeon. She married Jerod Swallow in September 1993. Her younger brother, Ricky, was charged in the death of their father, who was fatally stabbed on February 4, 1994, but he was found mentally unfit to stand trial.

== Career ==
Early in her career, Punsalan competed with Shawn Rettstatt. They placed 8th at the 1989 U.S. Championships.

Punsalan began skating with Swallow in mid-1989. They were initially coached by Sandy Hess in Colorado Springs, Colorado. They placed 7th at 1989 Skate America and 5th at the 1990 U.S. Championships. The following season, they won their first U.S. national title.

At the 1991 World Championships in Munich, they performed a "catchy" free dance based upon the theme of stock car racing. They both wore black sketch suits in racing colors; Punsalan wore a checkered flag skirt. They played the roles of race cars, with test trials, pit stops, and the race itself. Writer Ellyn Kestnbaum, in her discussion and analysis of the program, does not consider Punsalan and Swallow's program as a single coherent narrative, but states that it instead used a variety of images, including that of victory and defeat, related to their theme. Kestnbaum also stated that although their theme seemed to "defy gender", Punsalan's role of the car followed conventional representation of the female body taking on "the status of inanimate object (or alien 'other')", while Swallow represented the more male role of the human agent, or driver. Swallow took "literal control" of Punsalan's body in the program, which controlled the narrative imagery; as Kestnbaum put it, "The man's choreographed control of the woman's body thus results in male victory within the final image of the performance".

They were one of the favorites for the 1992 Olympic team but at the 1992 U.S. Championships, Swallow fell during the free dance and they finished in third. Swallow was ready to leave competition for show skating but she persuaded him to continue.

In 1992, Punsalan/Swallow began working with Igor Shpilband for choreography in Detroit. By the 1993–94 season, he had become their head coach. The couple developed a rivalry with Renee Roca / Gorsha Sur, who had earlier choreographed a program for them and trained alongside them. The U.S. had a single berth to the ice dancing event at the 1994 Winter Olympics. Punsalan and Swallow were involved in a letter-writing campaign to Congress to prevent Sur from receiving expedited citizenship, which would allow him to compete at the 1994 Olympics. At the U.S. Championships in January 1994, Punsalan/Swallow placed first in the original dance, ahead of their injured rivals in second. Roca/Sur withdrew before the free dance and Punsalan/Swallow went on to win their second national title and were named to the Olympic team. They competed at the 1994 Olympics only two weeks after her father's death, finishing 15th.

Punsalan/Swallow won silver at the 1995 U.S. Championships behind Roca and Sur but finished ahead of them the following year to take their third national title. Punsalan/Swallow won another two national titles at the 1997 and 1998 U.S. Championships. They placed 7th at the 1998 Winter Olympics and 6th at the 1998 World Championships.

Punsalan/Swallow ended their eligible career in 1998 and continued to skate in shows for a number of years. Punsalan became a coach at the Detroit Skating Club in Bloomfield Hills, Michigan.

== Results ==
(with Jerod Swallow)

International
Event	1989–90	1990–91	1991–92	1992–93	1993–94	1994–95	1995–96	1996–97	1997–98
Winter Olympics					15th				7th
World Champ.		11th			12th		7th	6th	6th
GP Final									6th
GP Cup of Russia								3rd	
GP Lalique					2nd	2nd		2nd	
GP NHK Trophy		6th		5th					
GP Skate America	7th		4th	3rd		1st		4th	1st
GP Skate Canada									2nd
National
U.S. Champ.	5th	1st	3rd	3rd	1st	2nd	1st	1st	1st
GP = Champions Series (Grand Prix)

(with Shawn Rettstatt)

Event	1988–89
U.S. Championships	8th
