= Karen Courtland =

American figure skater

Personal information
- Born: October 12, 1970 (age 55) Orange, New Jersey

Figure skating career
- Country: United States

Karen Courtland Kelly (born October 12, 1970, in Orange, New Jersey) is a former American pair skater. With partner Todd Reynolds, she won the bronze medal at the United States Figure Skating Championships in 1993 and 1994 and finished 14th at the 1994 Winter Olympic Games.

Courtland married former Canadian. ice speed skater Patrick Kelly. She is a motivational speaker and has taught pilates. She is president of the World Figure Sport Society.

== Results ==
=== With Davenport ===
Event	1984
U.S. Championships	8th J.

=== With Robert Daw ===
Event	1985	1996
U.S. Championships	8th	11th

=== With Joshua Roberts ===
Event	1987
U.S. Championships	10th

=== With David Goodman ===
Event	1988	1990
U.S. Championships	13th	9th

=== With Jason Dungjen ===
International
Event	1990–1991
Prague Skate	1st
National
U.S. Championships	5th

=== With Reynolds ===
International
Event	1991–92	1992–93	1993–94
Winter Olympic Games			14th
World Championships			17th
Skate America		6th	3rd
Trophée Lalique		3rd	4th
Piruetten			5th
National
U.S. Championships	4th	3rd	3rd
