= Nicole Bobek =

American figure skater

Personal information
- Born: August 23, 1977 (age 48) Chicago, Illinois, United States

Figure skating career
- Country: United States
- Retired: 1999
Medal record
Figure skating: Ladies' singles
Representing United States
World Championships
| Bronze medal – third place | 1995 Birmingham | Ladies' singles |
U.S. Championships
| Gold medal – first place | 1995 Providence | Ladies' singles |
| Bronze medal – third place | 1994 Detroit | Ladies' singles |
| Bronze medal – third place | 1997 Nashville | Ladies' singles |
| Bronze medal – third place | 1998 Philadelphia | Ladies' singles |

Nicole Bobek (born August 23, 1977) is a retired American figure skater. She is the 1995 U.S. national champion and 1995 World bronze medalist. She also competed at the 1998 Winter Olympics.

== Personal life ==
An only child, Bobek was raised by her Czech mother Jana, and by Jana's life partner Joyce Barron. Nicole has never met her father.

On January 24, 2017, Bobek married circus performer Pedro Santos Leal in Florida.

== Skating career ==
Bobek's interest in skating started when she was three. Carlo Fassi coached her in 1989 and 1990 and then returned to Italy for three years.

At age 11, Bobek won the novice silver medal at the 1989 U.S. Championships. In the next few seasons, she worked her way up the competitive rankings at the national level. She was known as an athletic jumper and a charismatic performer, but an erratic competitor and undisciplined student, often arriving late to training and skipping school. Bobek placed 4th at the 1991 World Junior Championships, but the next year dropped to 16th at the same event. Also in 1991, she won the Vienna Cup and the U.S. Olympic Festival. She made her first appearance at the senior World Championships in 1994, as an alternate (after both Nancy Kerrigan and Tonya Harding dropped out of the event), but failed to advance out of the qualifying round. She was coached by Evy Scotvold until the summer of 1994.

In late August 1994, Bobek joined Richard Callaghan at the Detroit Skating Club in Bloomfield Hills, Michigan. On November 27, 1994, she sustained a deep puncture wound in her neck when she was attacked by a friend's dog, but she still competed at the Thrifty Car Rental International Challenge several days later. The 1994–95 season brought Bobek her greatest competitive success; she won gold at the U.S. Championships, followed by the bronze medal at the World Championships. In late 1995, she toured with an ice show production of The Nutcracker, rather than rehabilitate an ankle injury or train for the upcoming 1996 U.S. Championships. The injury forced her out of the event after the short program. She changed coaches in the summer of 1996, joining Carlo Fassi at the Ice Castle International Training Center in Lake Arrowhead, California.

Bobek struggled with back problems during the 1996–97 season but won the bronze medal at the 1997 U.S. Championships. Her coach Carlo Fassi died from a heart attack at the 1997 World Championships. She was coached for a time by his widow, Christa Fassi, in Lake Arrowhead, California. She won bronze at the 1998 U.S. Nationals. At the 1998 Winter Olympics, she was impaired by a hip injury and finished in 17th-place. She withdrew from the subsequent World Championships due to another hip injury.

In the summer of 1998, Bobek left her coach, Christa Fassi, and returned to Richard Callaghan in Bloomfield Hills, Michigan. She finished 4th at the 1998 Skate America and won silver at the 1998 Trophée Lalique. She did not compete at the 1999 U.S. Championships. In August 1999, she began working with coach Kerry Leitch in Bradenton, Florida. Bobek withdrew from her two Grand Prix assignments, the 1999 Sparkassen Cup on Ice and 1999 Trophée Lalique, after falling ill in early November with an internal infection and a reaction to prescription drugs. She missed the qualifying events for the 2000 U.S. Championships and her application for a medical bye was declined. Although Bobek suggested in an April 2000 interview that she had not ended her competitive career, she never returned to competition.

Bobek toured with Champions on Ice for several years until 2004. She also appeared in numerous other shows and professional competitions.

ESPN sportswriter Amy K. Nelson opined, "Bobek coupled athleticism with ingenuity, choreographing her own routines and often improvising during performances. She was a master at playing to crowds who were wowed by her beauty and grace and a flexibility that seemed to ease her effortlessly into a trademark spiral move, her leg held straight up to her ear."

At her peak, Bobek was a strong jumper although some of her jumps did not have the best technique; for instance, she had a very marked flutz (a Lutz jump which is done from the wrong edge). She had a lasting impact on ladies' figure skating because of her signature move, a spiral with the free leg extended very high, which influenced later skaters such as Michelle Kwan and Sasha Cohen. Television commentators including Dick Button and Peggy Fleming were so complimentary of Bobek's spiral that it was widely copied by other U.S. skaters, setting off a fad for extreme flexibility moves.

Bobek was noted for her poor training discipline, for occasionally smoking cigarettes, for wearing a lot of jewelry while performing on the ice, and for changing coaches at least 11 times during her competitive skating career. She trained in California, Michigan, Colorado, Florida and Virginia. At one point she explained her behavior by saying: "I'm a teenager. That's what we do." In addition to Richard Callaghan and Carlo and Christa Fassi, Bobek's coaches included Frank Carroll, Mary and Evy Scotvold, Debbie Stoery, Kathy Casey, Hoon Kim, Barbara Roles, and Robin Cousins.

== Endorsements ==
Bobek's skating successes led to a contract with Campbell's Soup. Along with fellow skaters Michelle Kwan and Tara Lipinski, Bobek appeared in a commercial during the winter of 1998; featuring all three performing at an ice rink. In this commercial, heat from the soup melts the ice, leaving all three women standing in ankle-deep water. She also appeared in a commercial of Panasonic's 1998 Winter Olympics campaign in Japan.

== Film ==
In 2006, Bobek appeared in the film All the King's Men, as a skater who fascinates governor Willy Stark.

== Legal problems ==
In November 1994, Bobek was charged with first-degree home invasion after she used an access code to enter a friend's garage and home in Michigan. She allegedly took cash from a purse, but was caught when the homeowner arrived, and Bobek returned the money. She claimed that she was granted permission by another member of the household to enter the house and retrieve the cash. Bobek was 17 years old and legally an adult under Michigan criminal law, but she was eligible for probation with the record of the offense sealed from the public record by pleading guilty under the Holmes Youthful Trainee Act, a special law for youthful first offenders. In January 1995, she was sentenced to two years of probation and a choice between 50 hours of community service and 30 days in jail. Information regarding her case soon spread widely through skating circles and was leaked to the news media. Under the Youthful Trainee Act, cases are to remain confidential, so in February 1995, Bobek filed for dismissal. Though some journalists and legal scholars have argued that Michigan law allows journalists to release information about juvenile criminals if there is "compelling public interest," which was arguable given Bobek's status as a world-class figure skater, her motion for probation discharge was granted by the court. The appeals court reversed the decision of the trial court to terminate probation and remanded for a continuation of probation.

In late 2006, Bobek's mother raised and then dropped a petition to have her undergo rehabilitation, worrying that her daughter would become estranged. On July 6, 2009, Bobek was charged with conspiracy to distribute methamphetamine and was alleged to be a member of a drug ring. On June 18, 2010, she pleaded guilty, and on August 16 was sentenced to five years of probation, 250 hours of community service and a $2,500 fine.

== Recovery and later career ==
Bobek has admitted that she is a former drug addict, and has said that she wants to help other addicts overcome their addictions and would like to perform ice-show charity benefits. She began taking classes toward a high-school equivalency diploma and worked at a skating rink in Florida after six years away from skating. In 2010, she began teaching power skating and edge skills to junior hockey players at the rink. Her friend Todd Eldredge invited her to a Stars on Ice show, where she reconnected with her old coach Richard Callaghan and began weekly training sessions to return to shape.

Bobek returned to performing at the Skate for Love benefit for Susan G. Komen for the Cure in April 2011, hosted by her friend JoJo Starbuck. Bobek said: "I've been back on the ice about a year now. It took me a long time to get my balance again after six years; you really lose the rotation and all of those things. It took three months to do a single Axel again." By January 2012, she had recovered all of her double jumps except the Axel. In November 2011, Bobek said: "I'm blessed that I've been given a second chance in life. Life is so much better now. I think I was in a dark place and now I believe that I have God on my side. I'm very positive about things and very focused. I truly believe that I've bloomed into a different kind of person.." She appeared in skating shows aired on NBC and has appeared in various skating shows.

Bobek has also trained on trapeze and aerial hoops at the South Florida Circus Arts School. She has performed with the Rainbow Circus in Miami.

In October 2025, Bobek published a memoir entitled 'Bobek: The Wild One'.

== Programs ==
| Season | Short program | Free skating | Exhibition |
|---|---|---|---|
| | | | "Cabaret"; "I Need to Know" by Marc Anthony; "Let's Get Loud" by Jennifer Lopez; "Somewhere in Time"; "Imagine" |
| 1998–1999 | The Mask of Zorro | Evita (soundtrack) | |
| 1997–1998 | Zorba the Greek by Herb Alpert | "Invitation to Dance" by Carl Maria von Weber; "Victory March" by Giuseppe Verdi | "Somewhere in Time" |
| 1996–1997 | Russian folk from Moiseyev Dances | Giselle | |
| 1995–1996 | The Cotton Club (soundtrack) | Evita by Andrew Lloyd Webber; 1492: Conquest of Paradise by Vangelis | |
| 1994–1995 | Russian folk from Moiseyev Dances | Doctor Zhivago by Maurice Jarre | "Circle of Life" (from The Lion King); "Sacrifice" by Sinéad O'Connor |
| 1993–1994 | Russian folk from Moiseyev Dances | Russian folk from Moiseyev Dances | |

== Results ==
GP: Champions Series / Grand Prix

International
| Event | 89–90 | 90–91 | 91–92 | 92–93 | 93–94 | 94–95 | 95–96 | 96–97 | 97–98 | 98–99 |
|---|---|---|---|---|---|---|---|---|---|---|
| Olympics | | | | | | | | | 17th | |
| Worlds | | | | | 25th | 3rd | | 13th | | |
| GP Cup of Russia | | | | | | | | | 6th | |
| GP Lalique | | | | | 5th | | | | | 2nd |
| GP Nations Cup | | | | | | | 3rd | | | |
| GP Skate America | | | | 6th | | 7th | 6th | | | 4th |
| GP Skate Canada | | | | | | | | | 5th | |
| Goodwill Games | | | | | 7th | | | | | |
| Vienna Cup | | | 1st | | | | | | | |
International: Junior
| Junior Worlds | | 4th | | 16th | | | | | | |
National
| U.S. Championships | 4th J | 8th | 7th | 5th | 3rd | 1st | WD | 3rd | 3rd | |
| U.S. Olympic Festival | 7th | 1st | | | | | | | | |
J = Junior. WD = Withdrew
