= Scott Davis (figure skater) =

American figure skater

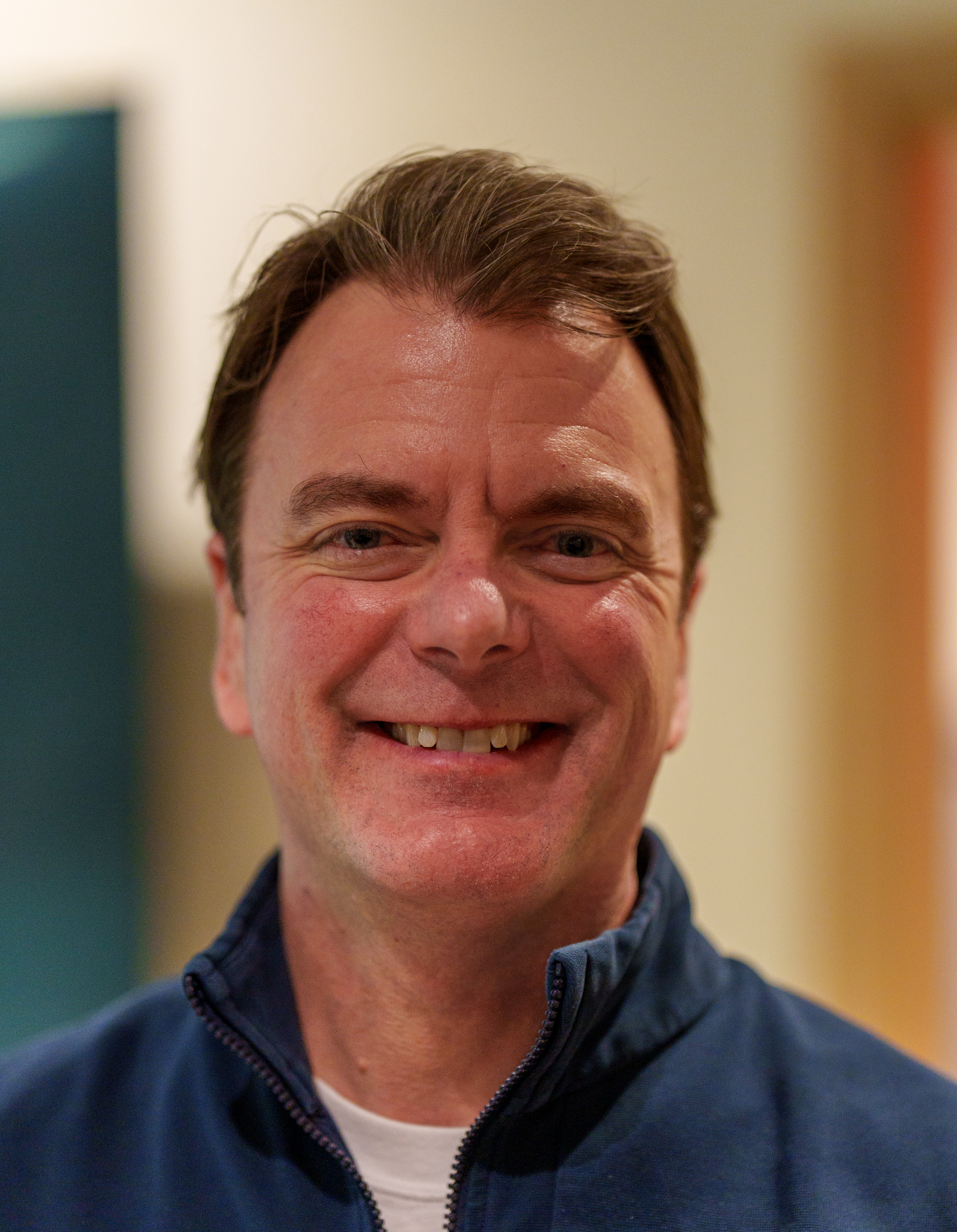

Personal information
- Born: January 29, 1972 (age 54) Great Falls, Montana, U.S.
- Home town: Calgary, Alberta, Canada
- Height: 5 ft 9 in (175 cm)

Figure skating career
- Country: United States
- Discipline: Men's singles
- Competitive: 1989-98
- Retired: 1998

Medal record
U.S. Championships
Gold medal – first place	1993 Phoenix	Singles
Gold medal – first place	1994 Detroit	Singles
Silver medal – second place	1995 Providence	Singles
Bronze medal – third place	1998 Philadelphia	Singles

Scott Davis (born January 29, 1972) is an American former competitive figure skater. He is a two-time (1993–94) U.S. national champion and represented the United States at the 1994 Winter Olympics, where he placed 8th.

== Career ==
Davis began his career when he won the U.S. junior national title during the 1989–90 season and began competing on the senior level nationally the following season.

In the 1992–93 season, Davis won silver at 1992 Skate America and 1992 Skate Canada International. He went on to win his first senior national title at the 1993 U.S. Championships and was assigned to his first senior World Championships where he placed sixth.

In 1993–94, Davis won silver at the 1993 Nations Cup and bronze at Piruetten. At the 1994 U.S. Championships, he repeated as national champion by defeating the 1988 Olympic gold medalist, Brian Boitano. Davis was sent to the 1994 Winter Olympics, where he finished eighth, and to the 1994 World Championships, where he placed seventh.

Davis won silver at the 1995 U.S. Championships and placed seventh again at the World Championships. In the following years, he suffered from vertigo and had problems with his jump consistency. Davis never again qualified for a World or Olympic team and retired from amateur competition in 1998. Known for his spinning ability, he was coached by Kathy Casey in Colorado Springs and Galina Zmievskaya in Simsbury, Connecticut.

After turning professional, Davis appeared in an ice show production of the musical Grease. He later became a coach in Calgary, Alberta, Canada. His students have included Vaughn Chipeur, Kaiya Ruiter and Lia Cho. Davis is also an ISU Technical Specialist. He was a technical specialist for the men's event at the 2006 World Championships.

== Personal life ==
Davis was born and raised in Great Falls, Montana. He is married to Stephanie LaRiviere, with whom he has a daughter, Maggie.

== Results ==
GP: Champions Series (Grand Prix)

International
Event	87–88	88–89	89–90	90–91	91–92	92–93	93–94	94–95	95–96	96–97	97–98
Olympics							8th				
Worlds			5th J	4th J		6th	7th	7th			
GP Nations Cup									4th		
GP NHK Trophy										4th	2nd
GP Skate America										7th	4th
GP Skate Canada									4th	3rd	
Nations Cup							2nd				
NHK Trophy								4th			
Piruetten					1st		3rd				
Skate America						2nd					
Skate Canada						2nd					
National
U.S. Champ.	9th J	4th J	1st J	8th	4th	1st	1st	2nd	4th	4th	3rd
J: Junior level
