= Todd Reynolds (figure skater) =

American pair skater (1966–2023)

Personal information
- Born: November 3, 1966 Norwalk, Connecticut, U.S.
- Died: October 15, 2023 (aged 56)

Figure skating career
- Country: United States

Richard Todd Reynolds (November 3, 1966 – October 15, 2023) was an American pair skater who competed with partner Karen Courtland. The pair won the bronze medal at the United States Figure Skating Championships in 1993 and 1994 and finished 14th at the 1994 Winter Olympic Games. Earlier in his career, Reynolds skated with Katie Wood. He died from a heart attack on October 15, 2023, at the age of 56.

== Results ==
(pairs with Karen Courtland)

International
Event	1991–92	1992–93	1993–94
Winter Olympic Games			14th
World Championships			17th
Skate America		6th	3rd
Trophée Lalique		3rd	4th
Piruetten			5th
National
U.S. Championships	4th	3rd	3rd

== Sources ==
- Sports-Reference.com
