= Michael Chack =

American figure skater (born 1971)

Personal information
- Born: August 25, 1971 (age 54) Toms River, New Jersey, U.S.

Figure skating career
- Country: United States
- Discipline: Men's singles
- Began skating: 1976
- Retired: 1999

Michael Chack (born August 25, 1971) is an American former competitive figure skater. He won gold medals at four senior international events, Nebelhorn Trophy, Karl Schäfer Memorial, Piruetten, and Winter Universiade, and one bronze, at the 1994 Trophée de France. Chack also won one senior national medal, bronze at the 1993 U.S. Championships. After his performance was skipped by the broadcaster, his surname became part of figure skating's colloquial vocabulary, e.g. "to chack" meaning to omit a good performance from a television broadcast.

Chack withdrew from the 1994 U.S. Championships due to a groin pull and a stress fracture in his right leg. He was coached by Peter Burrows for 14 years and by Frank Carroll for five years. After retiring from competition in 1999, he began touring with Holiday on Ice.

== Results ==
International
| Event | 88-89 | 89–90 | 90–91 | 91–92 | 92–93 | 93–94 | 94–95 | 95–96 | 96–97 | 97–98 | 98–99 |
|---|---|---|---|---|---|---|---|---|---|---|---|
| Skate America | | | | 4th | | | | | | | |
| Trophée de France | | | | | | | 3rd | | | | |
| Schäfer Memorial | | | | | | 1st | | | | | |
| Nebelhorn Trophy | | | 1st | | | | | | | | |
| Piruetten | | | | | 1st | | | | | 1st | |
| St. Gervais | | | 2nd | | | | | | | | |
| Universiade | | | 1st | | | | | | | | |
National
| U.S. Champ. | 7th J | 2nd J | 5th | 7th | 3rd | WD | 10th | | 7th | 9th | 8th |
WD: Withdrew; J: Junior
