= Jenni Meno =

American pair skater

Personal information
- Born: November 10, 1970 (age 55) Westlake, Ohio, U.S.
- Height: 4 ft 11.5 in (151 cm)

Figure skating career
- Country: United States
- Partner: Todd Sand
- Retired: 1998
Medal record
Pairs' figure skating
Representing United States
World Championships
Silver medal – second place	1998 Minneapolis	Pairs
Bronze medal – third place	1996 Edmonton	Pairs
Bronze medal – third place	1995 Birmingham	Pairs

Jenni N. Meno (born November 10, 1970, in Westlake, Ohio) is an American former competitive pair skater. With her husband Todd Sand, she is the 1998 World silver medalist, a two-time World bronze medalist (1995, 1996), and a three-time U.S. national champion (1994–96).

== Career ==
Meno first partnered with Scott Wendland and won two medals at the U.S. Championships. She began skating with her future husband Todd Sand in April 1992. They competed in two Olympics and won three national titles and three medals at the World Figure Skating Championships.

Following their amateur career, the pair skated professionally in the Stars on Ice tour for six seasons. Meno also appeared in the 2006 FOX television program Skating with Celebrities.

Meno and Sand were inducted into the United States Figure Skating Hall of Fame in 2010.

Meno works as a coach with her husband. They formerly coached John Baldwin / Rena Inoue, Mary Beth Marley / Rockne Brubaker, and Jessica Calalang / Zack Sidhu.

== Personal life ==
Meno and Sand became engaged the day of their short program at the 1994 Olympics in Lillehammer, Norway. They were married July 22, 1995. They have two sons, Jack, born in 2004, and Matthew Kenneth, born on August 14, 2006.

== Competitive highlights ==
=== Ladies' singles ===
Event	1989
U.S. Championships	10th

=== Pairs ===
==== With Todd Sand ====
International
Event	1992–93	1993–94	1994–95	1995–96	1996–97	1997–98
Olympics		5th				8th
Worlds	5th	6th	3rd	3rd	5th	2nd
CS Final				4th	WD	
CS Lalique		3rd		3rd	2nd	
CS NHK Trophy			5th		1st	2nd
CS Skate America				2nd		
Prague Skate	1st					
National
U.S. Champ.	2nd	1st	1st	1st	2nd	WD
CS = Champions Series from 1995 to 1996 (later renamed Grand Prix); WD = Withdrew

==== With Scott Wendland ====
International
Event	1990–1991	1991–1992
Olympics		11th
World Championships	10th	11th
Skate Canada		5th
National
U.S. Championships	3rd	2nd
