= Kyoko Ina =

American figure skater (born 1972)

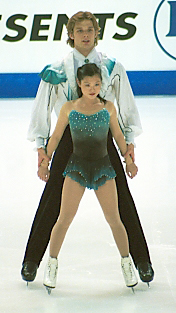
- Ina and Zimmerman in 2001.

Personal information
- Born: October 11, 1972 (age 54) Tokyo, Japan
- Height: 5 ft 0 in (1.52 m)

Figure skating career
- Country: United States
- Partner: John Zimmerman
- Skating club: SC of New York
- Retired: 2002
Medal record
Representing United States
Pairs' Figure skating
World Championships
Bronze medal – third place	2002 Nagano	Pairs
Four Continents Championships
Bronze medal – third place	2001 Salt Lake City	Pairs
Silver medal – second place	2000 Osaka	Pairs

Kyoko Ina (伊奈 恭子, Ina Kyōko; born October 11, 1972) is an American figure skater. With partner John Zimmerman, she is the 2002 World bronze medalist and a three-time (2000–2002) U.S. national champion. The pair also competed at the 2002 Winter Olympics. With previous partner Jason Dungjen, Ina was a two-time (1997 & 1998) U.S. champion and competed at the 1994 and 1998 Olympics.

== Personal life ==
Kyoko Ina was born in Tokyo, Japan and raised in Upper West Side, Manhattan. Her grandfather, Katsuo Okazaki, was an Olympic runner (and Japanese Foreign Minister between 1952 and 1954), her grandmother, Shimako Okazaki, was a tennis player, and her mother, Yoshi Ina, competed as a swimmer and a sculler.

== Skating career ==
Ina started skating at the rink at Rockefeller Center at the age of three or four. She skated singles and pairs for Japan in the Junior ranks, but eventually decided to compete solely for the United States.

Her first American partnership was with Jason Dungjen from 1991 to 1998, under the coaching of Peter Burrows and Marylynn Gelderman in Monsey, New York. They placed 4th at the 1998 Winter Olympics but withdrew from the 1998 World Championships after an accident during a practice session – while practicing a triple twist, Ina's arm hit Dungjen's forehead, fracturing the browbone above his right eye. Their partnership ended following that season.

Ina teamed up with John Zimmerman in 1998. Initially, they were coached by Peter Burrows and Mary Lynn Gelderman in Monsey, New York and they also commuted to Stamford, Connecticut, to work with Tamara Moskvina. They later trained under Moskvina and Igor Moskvin in Hackensack, New Jersey.

Ina and Zimmerman are able to capitalize on their height difference and perform various difficult lifts. They won three U.S. Championships and competed at the 2002 Winter Olympics. They won the bronze medal at the 2002 World Championships.

Ina had not yet turned professional when, on July 18, 2002, the USADA chose to perform an out-of-competition doping test on her. The agent came to her home for an unscheduled test at 10:30 at night. Ina stated that she could not produce the urine sample because she had already prepared to go to sleep. Ina was led to believe by the agent that the test could be rescheduled for the following day, but she was later charged with refusing to take a doping test. She was suspended by the USADA because of this and faced fines. Despite what had been reported, Ina never faced suspension from the International Skating Union because the refused test was a national out of competition test. Ina's case was further complicated because it was not clear at the time if she had or had not officially retired from competition at the time of the attempted test. Ina eventually filed a case with the Court of Arbitration for Sport, but later withdrew it. In the end, Ina accepted a two-year sanction from the USADA.

Ina and Zimmerman skated with the Stars on Ice tour for many years. In 2010, Ina competed in the second season of the Canadian reality competition Battle of the Blades partnered with retired NHL player Kelly Chase.

Ina currently coaches in New York.

Ina was inducted into the U.S. Figure Skating Hall of Fame in 2018.

== Programs ==
=== With Zimmerman ===
Season	Short program	Free skating
2001–02	Shine On You Crazy Diamond by Roger Waters, Pink Floyd	Rhapsody on a Theme of Paganini by Sergei Rachmaninov
2000–01	Truman Show	Rhapsody on a Theme of Paganini by Sergei Rachmaninov

=== With Dungjen ===
Season	Short program	Free skating
1997–98		Polovtsian Dances by Alexander Borodin
1996–97		Grand Canyon Suite
1995-96		Slaughter on 10th Avenue
1994–95		Far and Away by John Williams

== Competitive history ==
GP: Champions Series / Grand Prix

=== Pair skating with Zimmerman ===
International
Event	1998–99	1999–00	2000–01	2001–02
Olympics				5th
Worlds	9th	7th	7th	3rd
Four Continents		2nd	3rd	
GP Final	5th			4th
GP Cup of Russia	3rd		4th	
GP Lalique	2nd	4th	3rd	2nd
GP Skate America	5th	5th	4th	2nd
GP Skate Canada		2nd		
GP Sparkassen				2nd
National
U.S. Champ.	2nd	1st	1st	1st

=== Pair skating with Dungjen ===
International
Event	91–92	92–93	93–94	94–95	95–96	96–97	97–98
Olympics			9th				4th
Worlds			12th	8th	6th	4th	
GP Lalique				5th			6th
GP Nations Cup		2nd	3rd		4th	3rd	
GP NHK Trophy					4th	3rd	
GP Skate America			2nd	5th	4th		2nd
GP Skate Canada						3rd	
Continents Cup						2nd	
Piruetten			3rd				
Schäfer Memorial						1st	
National
U.S. Champ.	7th	5th	2nd	2nd	2nd	1st	1st

=== Single skating for the United States ===
International
Event	88–89	89–90	90–91	91–92	92–93	94–95	96–97
World Junior Championships		5th					
NHK Trophy			6th				
Nebelhorn		1st					
National
U.S. Champ.	1st J		7th	8th	10th	4th	11th
J = Junior level

=== Single skating for Japan ===
Event	1986–87
World Junior Championships	8th
Japanese Junior Championships	1st
