= Jason Dungjen =

American figure skater (born 1967)

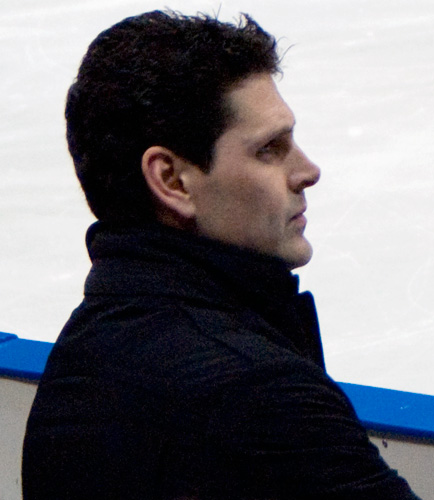
- Dungjen in 2010

Personal information
- Born: September 28, 1967 (age 58) Detroit, Michigan, U.S
- Height: 6 ft 0 in (1.83 m)

Figure skating career
- Country: United States
- Retired: 1998

Jason Dungjen (born September 28, 1967) is an American figure skating coach and a former pair skater. With Kyoko Ina, he is a two-time Skate America silver medalist, a three-time Nations Cup medalist, and a two-time U.S. national champion. With Susan Dungjen, he is the 1983 NHK Trophy silver medalist and 1984 World Junior silver medalist.

== Career ==
Dungjen's first skating partner was his sister, Susan Dungjen. Together, they won silver medals at the 1983 NHK Trophy, 1984 World Junior Championships, and 1984 Grand Prix International St. Gervais. After their partnership ended, he competed with Paula Visingardi and Karen Courtland.

Dungjen began competing with Kyoko Ina in the 1991–92 season. They won the 1997 and 1998 U.S. Championships and placed fourth at the 1998 Winter Olympics. They withdrew from the 1998 World Championships after an accident during a practice session — while practicing a triple twist, Ina's arm hit Dungjen's forehead, fracturing the browbone above his right eye. Their partnership dissolved after the event and he retired from competition. Dungjen later skated with then-wife Yuka Sato on the Stars on Ice tour.

Dungjen is a coach at the Detroit Skating Club in Bloomfield Hills, Michigan and an ISU Technical Specialist for the United States. Among others, he has coached Alissa Czisny, Jeremy Abbott, Valentina Marchei, and Adam Rippon.

== Personal life ==
Dungjen is married to Clara Rua.

== Programs ==
(with Ina)

Season	Short program	Free skating
1997–1998		Polovtsian Dances by Alexander Borodin
1996–1997		Grand Canyon Suite

== Competitive highlights ==
=== With Kyoko Ina ===
Results
International
Event	1991–92	1992–93	1993–94	1994–95	1995–96	1996–97	1997–98
Olympics			9th				4th
Worlds			12th	8th	6th	4th	
CS Lalique				5th			6th
CS Nations Cup		2nd	3rd		4th	3rd	
CS NHK Trophy					4th	3rd	
CS Skate America			2nd	5th	4th		2nd
CS Skate Canada						3rd	
Continents Cup						2nd	
Karl Schäfer						1st	
Piruetten			3rd				
National
U.S. Champ.	7th	5th	2nd	2nd	2nd	1st	1st
CS = Became part of Champions Series in 1995–1996 (later Grand Prix)

=== With Karen Courtland ===
Results
International
Event	1990–1991
Prague Skate	1st
National
U.S. Championships	5th

=== With Paula Visingardi ===
Results
International
Event	1988–89	1989–90
NHK Trophy		5th
National
U.S. Championships	9th	8th

=== With Susan Dungjen ===
Results
International
Event	1982–83	1983–84	1984–85	1985–86
NHK Trophy		2nd	5th	
International St. Gervais			2nd	
International: Junior
World Junior Championships		2nd		
National
U.S. Championships	1st J.	8th	4th	6th
