= 1990 U.S. Figure Skating Championships =

Figure skating competition

- Type: National Championship
- Date: February 6 – 11
- Season: 1989–90
- Location: Salt Lake City, Utah

Champions
- Men's singles: Todd Eldredge
- Ladies' singles: Jill Trenary
- Pairs: Kristi Yamaguchi / Rudy Galindo
- Ice dance: Susan Wynne / Joseph Druar
- Previous: 1989 U.S. Championships
- Next: 1991 U.S. Championships

The 1990 U.S. Figure Skating Championships took place in Salt Lake City, Utah. Medals were awarded in four colors: gold (first), silver (second), bronze (third), and pewter (fourth) in four disciplines – men's singles, ladies' singles, pair skating, and ice dancing – across three levels: senior, junior, and novice.

The event determined the U.S. teams for the 1990 World Championships.

== Senior results ==
=== Men ===
Rank	Name	CF	SP	FS
1	Todd Eldredge	1	1	2
2	Paul Wylie	3	2	1
3	Mark Mitchell	6	3	3
4	Erik Larson	7	4	4
5	Daniel Doran	2	8	5
6	Craig Heath	9	6	6
7	Shepherd Clark	8	10	7
8	Doug Mattis	5	9	9
9	Aren Nielsen	13	7	8
10	Larry Holliday	12	12	10
11	Colin Vander Veen	11	11	11
12	Eddie Shipstad	10	13	12
13	Troy Goldstein	15	14	13
14	Richard Sears	14	16	14
15	Jon Robinson	16	15	15
WD	Christopher Bowman	4	5	

=== Ladies ===
Rank	Name	CF	SP	FS
1	Jill Trenary	1	3	1
2	Kristi Yamaguchi	5	1	2
3	Holly Cook	2	5	4
4	Nancy Kerrigan	7	4	3
5	Jeri Campbell	4	7	5
6	Tonia Kwiatkowski	6	6	6
7	Tonya Harding	3	2	10
8	Dena Galech	12	9	7
9	Tisha Walker	15	8	8
10	Kyoko Ina	14	10	9
11	Stacy Rutkowski	13	11	12
12	Jenni Meno	16	12	11
13	Carrie Weber	11	15	13
14	Kathaleen Kelly	9	13	15
15	Jennifer Lang	8	16	14
16	Jodi Friedman	10	14	16

=== Pairs ===
Rank	Name	OP	FS
1	Kristi Yamaguchi / Rudy Galindo	1	1
2	Natasha Kuchiki / Todd Sand	2	2
3	Sharon Carz / Doug Williams	3	3
4	Calla Urbanski / Mark Naylor	4	4
5	Angela Deneweth / John Denton	8	5
6	Elaine Asanakis / Joel McKeever	9	6
7	Maria Lako / Rocky Marval	7	7
8	Paula Visingardi / Jason Dungjen	5	9
9	Karen Courtland / David Goodman	10	8
10	Jennifer Heurlin / John Frederiksen	6	10
11	Dawn Goldstein / Troy Goldstein	12	11
12	Vanessa Moore / Todd Reynolds	13	12
13	Ann-Marie Wells / Brian Wells	11	13

=== Ice dancing ===
Rank	Name	CD1	CD2	OD	FD
1	Susan Wynne / Joseph Druar			1	1
2	April Sargent / Russ Witherby			2	2
3	Suzanne Semanick / Ron Kravette			3	3
4	Jeanne Miley / Michael Verlich			5	4
5	Elizabeth Punsalan / Jerod Swallow			4	5
6	Beth McLean / Ari Leib			6	6
7	Lisa Grove / Scott Myers			7	7
8	Amy Webster / Leif Erickson			8	8
9	Wendy Millette / James Curtis			9	9
10	Ann Neale / Laurence Shaffer			10	11
11	Hilary Olney / John Miller			11	10
12	Elisa Curtis / Robert Nardozza			12	12
13	Jennifer Goolsbee / Shawn Rettstatt			13	13
14	Tiffany Ann Veltre / Duane Greenleaf			14	14
15	Mimi Wacholder / Bruce Montemayor			15	15

== Junior results ==
=== Men ===
Rank	Name	CF	SP	FS
1	Scott Davis	4	1	
2	Michael Chack	6	2	
3	John Baldwin, Jr.	1	3	
4	Steven Smith	9	4	
5	Gig Siruno	2	5	
6	Philip Dulebohn			
7	Richard Alexander	12	6	
8	Dan Hollander			
9	Brian Schmidt			
10	Lance Travis			
11	Tom Jasper			
12	Todd Gairrett			

=== Ladies ===
Rank	Name	CF	SP	FS
1	Alice Sue Claeys	1	1	2
2	Geremi Weiss	2	5	1
3	Dana MacDonald	5	4	3
4	Nicole Bobek	8	2	6
5	Meredith Vaughan	7	3	7
6	Cameryn McCoy	3	12	5
7	Charlene Von Saher	12	8	4
8	Karen Gooley	9	6	10
9	Natasha Kuchiki	10	9	9
10	Robyn Petroskey	6	7	12
11	Jennifer Verili	13	11	8
12	Jennifer Davidson	15	10	11
13	Amanda Farkas	14	13	13
WD	Casey Link	11	14	

=== Pairs ===
Rank	Name	SP	FS
1	Tristan Vega / Richard Alexander	1	1
2	Susan Ann Purdy / Scott Chiamulera	3	2
3	Aimee Offner / Brian Helgenberg	2	3
4	Kara Paxton / Brad Cox	4	4
5	Cambria Goodman / Steven Moore	5	6
6	Dawn Piepenbrink / Nick Castaneda	8	5
7	Laura La Barca / Kenneth Benson	7	7
8	Nicole Sciarrotta / Gregory Sciarrotta Jr.	9	8
9	Lisa Matras / Melvin Chapman	11	9
10	Jamie Marie Sharpe / David Walker	10	10
11	Brandee Marvin / Christopher Beck	6	12
12	Jennifer Bayer / Sean Gales	12	11

=== Ice dancing ===
Rank	Name	CD1	CD2	OD	FD
1	Beth Buhl / Neale Smull			1	1
2	Krista Schulz / Jonathan Stine			2	2
3	Rachel Lane / Eric Meier			3	3
4	Cheryl Demkowski / Jeff Czarnecki			4	4
5	Katherine Williamson / Ben Williamson			5	5
6	Dana Schneider / Robert Davis			6	6
7	Jennifer Luckhurst / Collin Sullivan			8	7
8	Jocelyn Cox / Brad Cox			7	9
9	Michelle Maier / Tony Darnell			10	8
10	Amy Neff / Kirk Strotman			11	10
11	Kimberly Callahan / Robert Paul			9	12
12	Christine Fowler / David Kastan			12	11
