= Turkish Ice Skating Federation =

Ice skating governing body in Turkey

- Formation: 2006
- Type: Sports association
- Headquarters: Ankara, Turkey
- Members: International Skating Union (ISU)
- President: Burhan Kurtuluş
- Website: www.buzpateni.org.tr

The Turkish Ice Skating Federation (Turkish: Türkiye Buz Pateni Federasyonu, TBPF) is the main ice skating governing body overlooking speed skating, figure skating, ice dancing and synchronized skating in Turkey.

== History ==
The Turkish Ice Skating Federation (TBPF) was founded in 2006. It is a member of the Turkish Olympic Committee and the International Skating Union (ISU). Currently, the federation's president is Burhan Kurtuluş.

Curling in Turkey was initially governed by the TBPF until the establishment of the Turkish Curling Federation in 2015, which took up its full action the next year.

== Adult figure skating ==
After the international success of the then 32-year old figure skater Naz Arıcı (born 1982) in 2015, adult figure skating branch was established by the Federation in 2016.

== Competitions ==
=== National level ===
The TBPF organizes tournaments, championships and cups at national level for various age groups in figure skating, ice dancing, synchronized skating and speed skating.

=== International competitions hosted by Turkey ===
- Bosphorus Cup (figure skating)
- Short-track speed skating at the 2011 Winter Universiade
- Figure skating at the 2017 European Youth Olympic Winter Festival
- Short-track speed skating at the 2017 European Youth Olympic Winter
- ISU Junior Grand Prix in Turkey

== Ice rinks ==
The TBPF operates many ice rinks across Turkey, which are also used for other ice sports.

== Notable sportspeople ==
=== Male ===
- Berk Akalın (born 1995), figure skater,
- Furkan Akar (born2002), Olympian short track speed skater,
- Engin Ali Artan (born 1992), figure skater,
- Ali Demirboğa (born 1990), figure skater,
- Başar Oktar (born 2002), figure skater,
- Burak Demirboğa (born 1996), figure skater,
- İlhan Mansız (born 1975), footballer and pair skater,
- Alper Uçar (born 1985), Olympian figure skater,

=== Female ===
- Alisa Agafonova (born 1991), Ukrainian-Turkish Olympian figure skater,
- Birce Atabey (born 1993), figure skater,
- Naz Arıcı (born 1982), adult figure skater,
- Güzide Irmak Bayır (born 2002), figure skater,
- Buse Coskun (born 1989), figure skater,
- Katarina DelCamp (born 2004), American-Turkish figure skater,
- Çağla Demirsal (born 2995), figure skater,
- Tuğba Karademir (born 1985), Olympian figure skater,
- Sıla Saygı (born 1996), figure skater,
