= Naz Arıcı =

Turkish figure skater (born 1982)

Personal information
- Born: 29 July 1982 (age 44) Ankara, Turkey

Figure skating career
- Coach: Timuçin Özbükücü
Medal record
Adult figure skating: Ladies' free singles
Representing Turkey

Naz Arıcı (born 29 July 1982) is a Turkish figure skater who competes at adult figure skating competitions. After taking up the sport aged 29, she began competing professionally in 2015 and has won three gold medals between 2019 and 2024.

== Life and career ==
=== 1982-2018: Early life ===
Naz Arıcı was born to two teachers in Ankara, Turkey, on 29 July 1982. She studied electrical/electronic engineering at Atılım University in Ankara. After graduating with honors, she spent time working as an engineer, a job she quit in 2016. She started ice skating aged 29 while severely depressed as a result of the death of her best friend and tried to teach herself using videos on the internet before taking lessons by the coaches Timuçin Özbükücü, whom she met during a public ice skating session, and Duygu Salur. A member of the Yenimahalle Municipality Sports Club in Ankara, she moved to Erzurum after the Olympic ice rink in Ankara closed in order to continue with her exercise. She injured her left knee and broke her right toe before her first international competition.

In May 2015, aged 32, she participated as the first Turkish sportswoman at an international adult figure skating competition. She competed in the Bronze Ladies I Free Skating (FS) event, which is the age range category for those 28–37 years old, at the Adult Figure Skating Competition organized by the International Skating Union (ISU) and held in Oberstdorf, Germany. She became champion with 34.67 points among 35 competitors from 15 countries. With her success in 2015, she paved the way to adult figure skating in her country, and so the adult figure skating branch was established by the Turkish Ice Skating Federation in 2016. She has won all Turkish championships since then. In June 2016, she took the first title again in the same event at the competition in Oberstdorf, Germany, with 41.19 points among 36 participants from 12 countries.

Promoted to the Silver I FS category, Arıcı repeated her champions title at the ISU Adult Figure Skating Competition in Vancouver, British Columbia, Canada, in August/September that year with 35.75 points among nine participants from six countries. She became champion with 34.97 points at the Turkish Adult Figure Skating Championship organized by the İce Skating Federation and held in BelPa Ice Skating Facility, Ankara, in January 2017. In May that year, Arıcı competed in the Silver I FS event at the ISU Adult Figure Skating Competition in Oberstdorf, Germany, and became champion with a record score of 58.01 points among 22 figure skaters from 15 countries. Promoted to the Gold I category, she took part in the Free Skating event at the 2018 International Adult Competition in Burnaby, British Columbia, Canada, and was runner-up with 42.27 points among nine participants from three countries.

=== 2019-present: Later life ===
In May 2019, Arıcı competed in the Gold I FS event at the ISU Adult Figure Skating Competition in Oberstdorf, Germany. She failed for the first time to win a medal, and ranked sixth with 45.57 points among 13 competitors from ten countries. That year, she became the four-time consecutive Turkish champion in Adult Figure Skating and won a gold medal at that year's Swan Challenge in Bled, Slovenia, in the Single Ladies Free Skating Gold I event with 40.77 points. She took also a silver medal in the Single Ladies Artistic Free Skating Gold YA+I event at the same competition with 18.67 points among three competitors from three counties.

Arıcı was entitled to compete at the 2020 Winter World Masters Games, which is held every four years, as the first and only sportsperson from Turkey. At that event, she was placed in the Gold II FS category, which is for those between the ages of 38 and 47. In May 2022, she participated at the ISU Adult Figure Skating Competition in Oberstdorf, Germany, where she failed to win a medal and ranked sixth with 45.63 points among 12 competitors from seven countries. She competed at the 2023 ISU Adult Figure Skating Competition in Oberstdorf, Germany, in May and captured the gold medal with 55.69 points among 17 participants from 13 countries. In January 2024, Arıcı competed in the Gold II FS event at the Winter World Masters Games in Lombardy, Italy, and captured the gold medal with 51.22 points among 21 competitors from nine countries. She also won the silver medal at that event during the 2024 ISU Adult Figure Skating Competition in Oberstdorf, Germany, in May with 52.16 points among 13 participants from ten countries. That month, she became Turkish champion in the Adult II event at the Figure Skating Youth Cup in Samsun.

== International competition record ==
Year	Date	Place	Competition	Event	Rank	Score	No. of competitors/no. of countries	Ref
2015	18–23 May	Oberstdorf, Germany	ISU Adult Figure Skating Competition	Bronze I FS	1st place, gold medalist(s)	34.67	35/15	
2016	13–18 June	Oberstdorf, Germany	ISU Adult Figure Skating Competition	Bronze I FS	1st place, gold medalist(s)	41.19	36/12	
2016	29 August – 3 September	Vancouver, Canada	ISU Adult Figure Skating Competition	Silver I FS	1st place, gold medalist(s)	35.75	9/6	
2017	22–27 May	Oberstdorf, Germany	ISU Adult Figure Skating Competition	Silver I FS	1st place, gold medalist(s)	58.01	22/15	
2018	11–13 October	Burnaby, Canada	International Adult Competition	Gold I FS	2nd place, silver medalist(s)	42.27	9/3	
2019	19–-25 May	Oberstdorf, Germany	ISU Adult Figure Skating Competition	Gold I FS	6th	45.57	13/10	
2019	1–3 November	Bled, Slovenia	Swan Challenge	Single FS Gold I	1st place, gold medalist(s)	40.77	2/2	
2019	1–3 November	Bled, Slovenia	Swan Challenge	Single Artistic FS Gold YA+I	2nd place, silver medalist(s)	18.67	3/3	
2022	23–28 May	Oberstdorf, Germany	ISU Adult Figure Skating Competition	Gold II FS	6th	45.63	12/7	
2023	15–20 May	Oberstdorf, Germany	ISU Adult Figure Skating Competition	Gold II FS	1st place, gold medalist(s)	55.69	17/13	
2024	12–21 January	Lombardy, Italy	Winter World Masters Games	Gold II FS	1st place, gold medalist(s)	51.22	21/9	
2024	12–17 May	Oberstdorf, Germany	ISU Adult Figure Skating Competition	Gold II FS	2nd place, silver medalist(s)	52.16	13/10	
