= Larry Holliday =

American figure skater

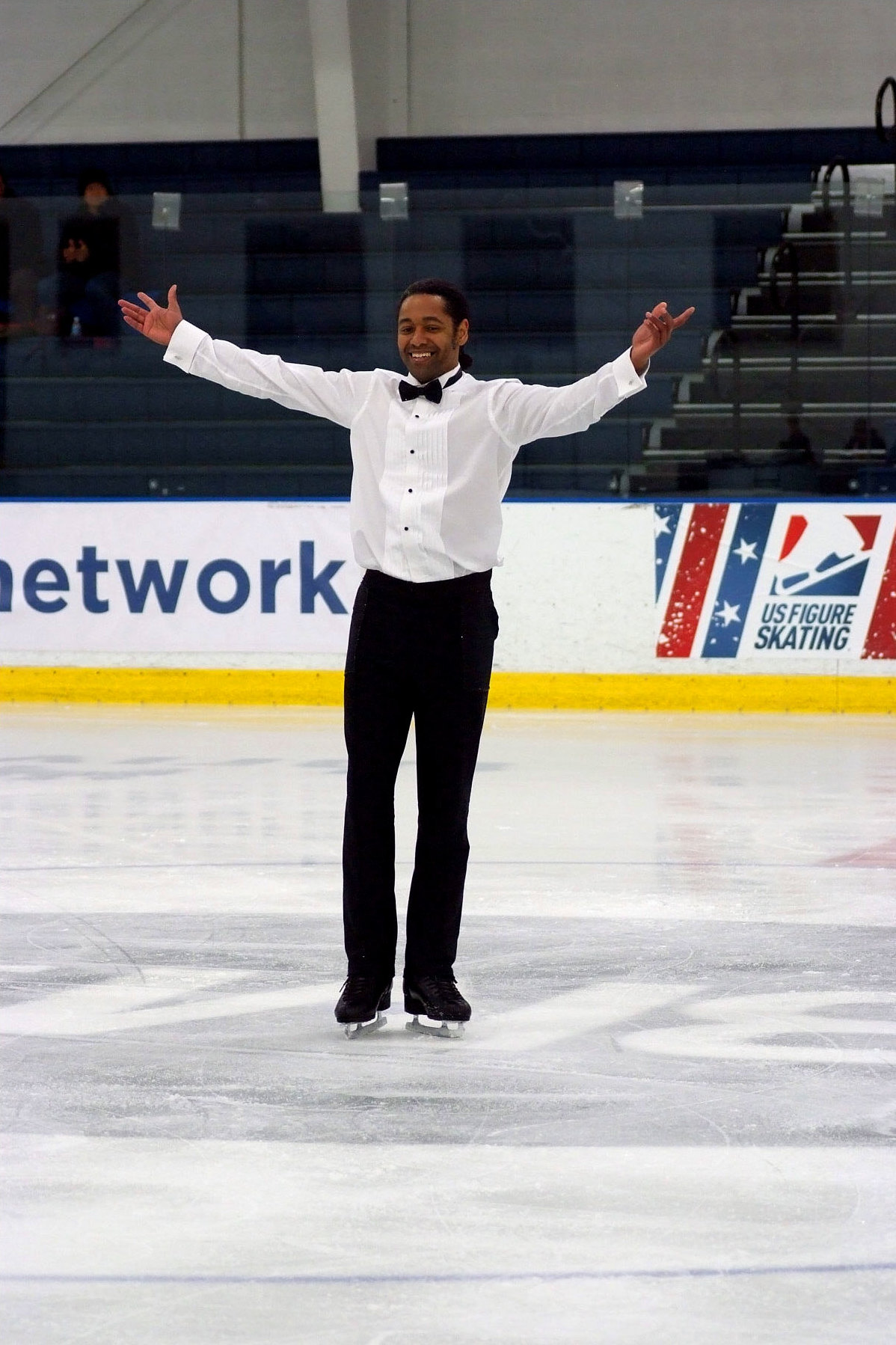

Personal information
- Born: July 5, 1964 (age 62) Chicago, Illinois, U.S.
- Height: 5 ft 11 in (180 cm)

Figure skating career
- Country: United States
- Discipline: Men's singles
- Coach: Ray Belmonte
- Skating club: Albuquerque FSC

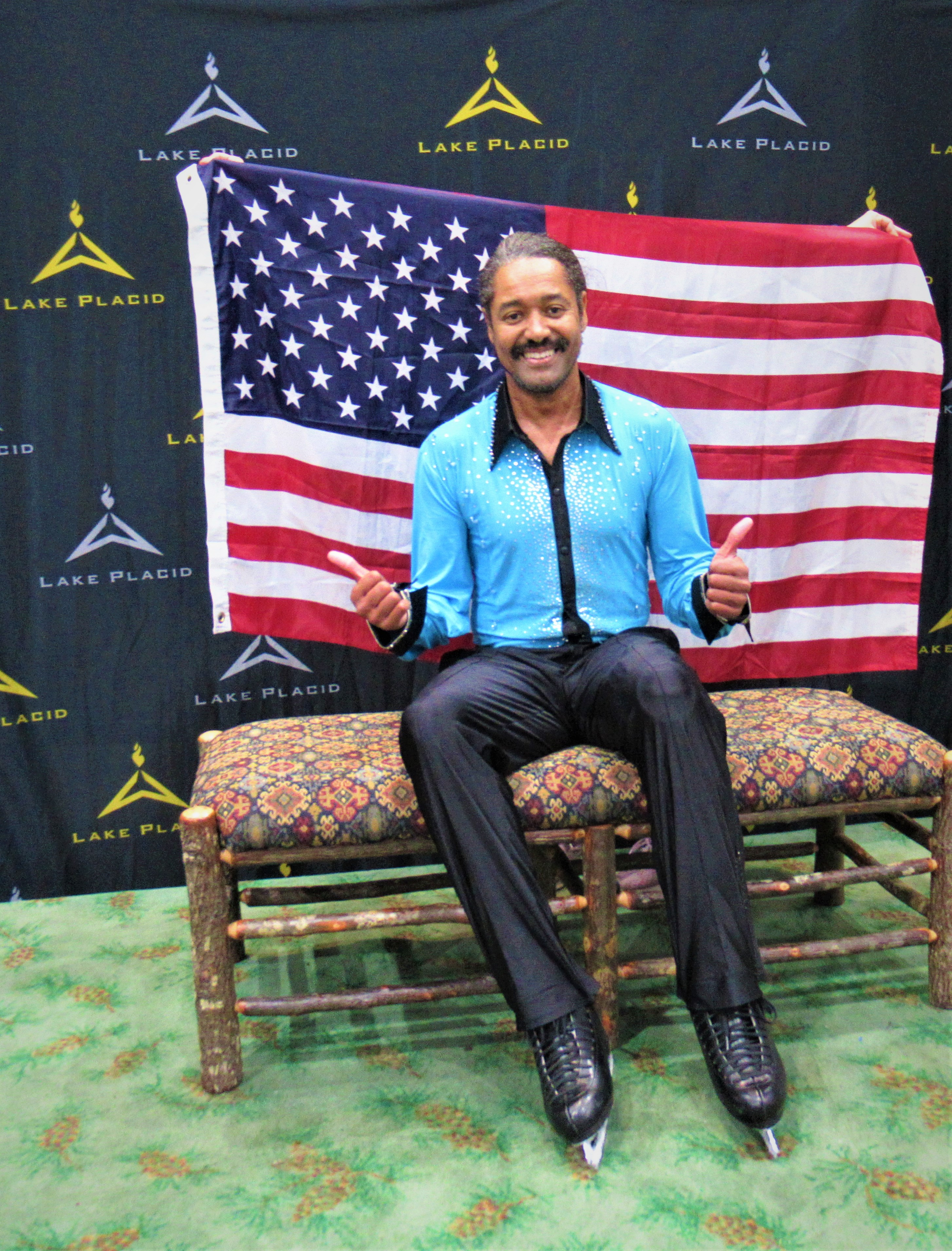
2019 ISU Adult International - Lake Placid, New York

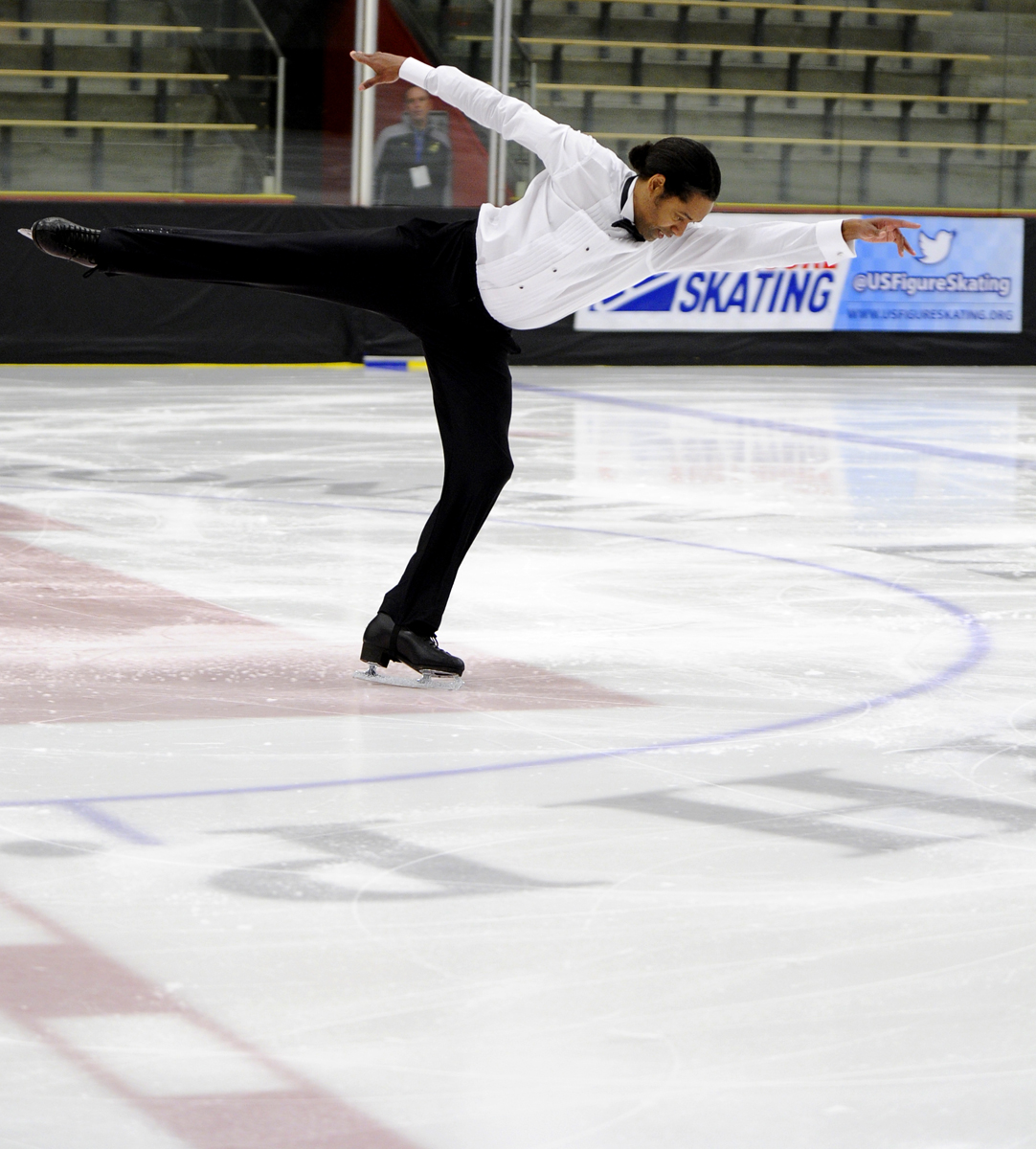
2014 United States Adult Nationals - Hyannis, Massachusetts

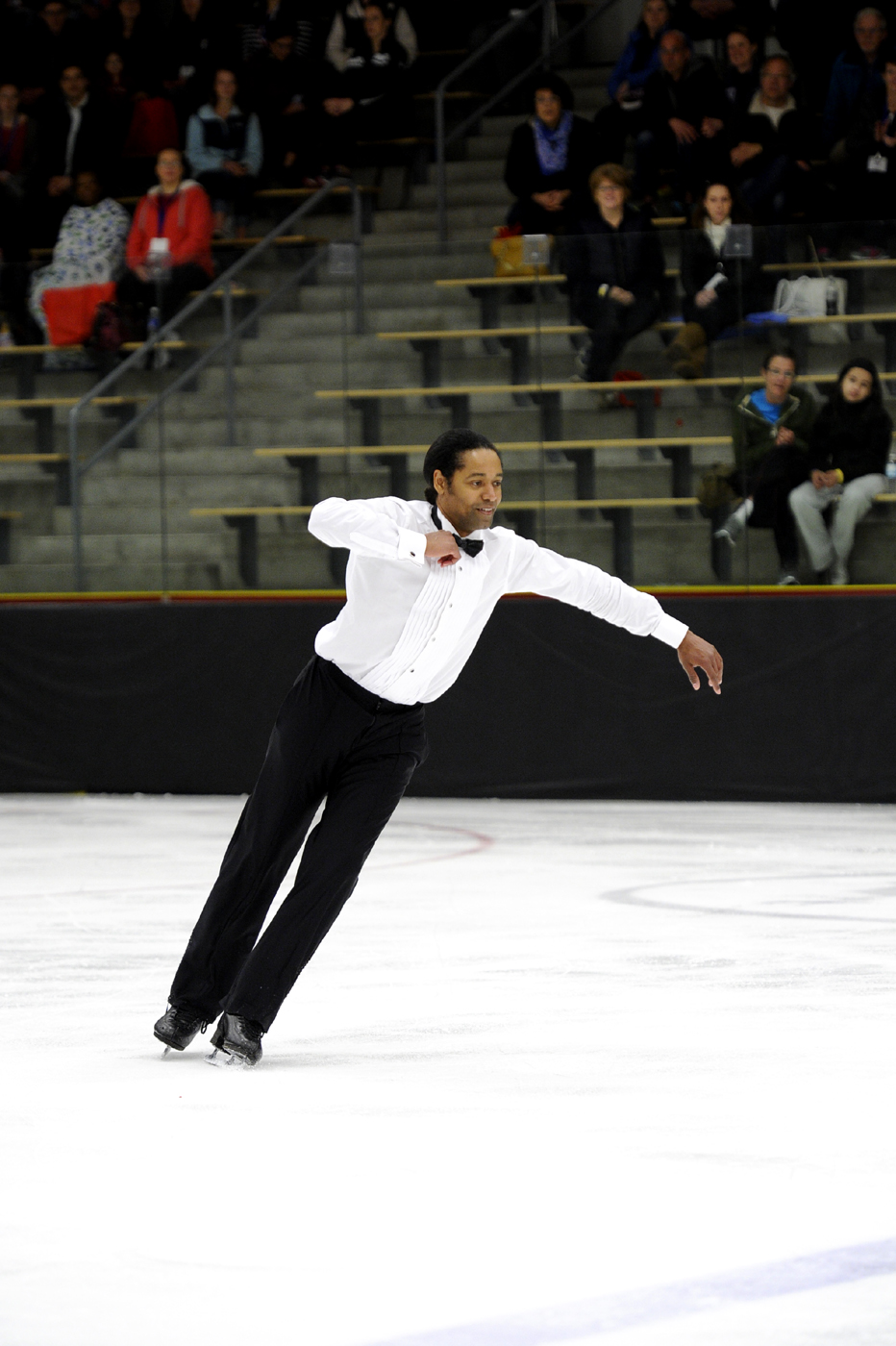
2014 U.S. Adult Nationals - Hyannis, Massachusetts

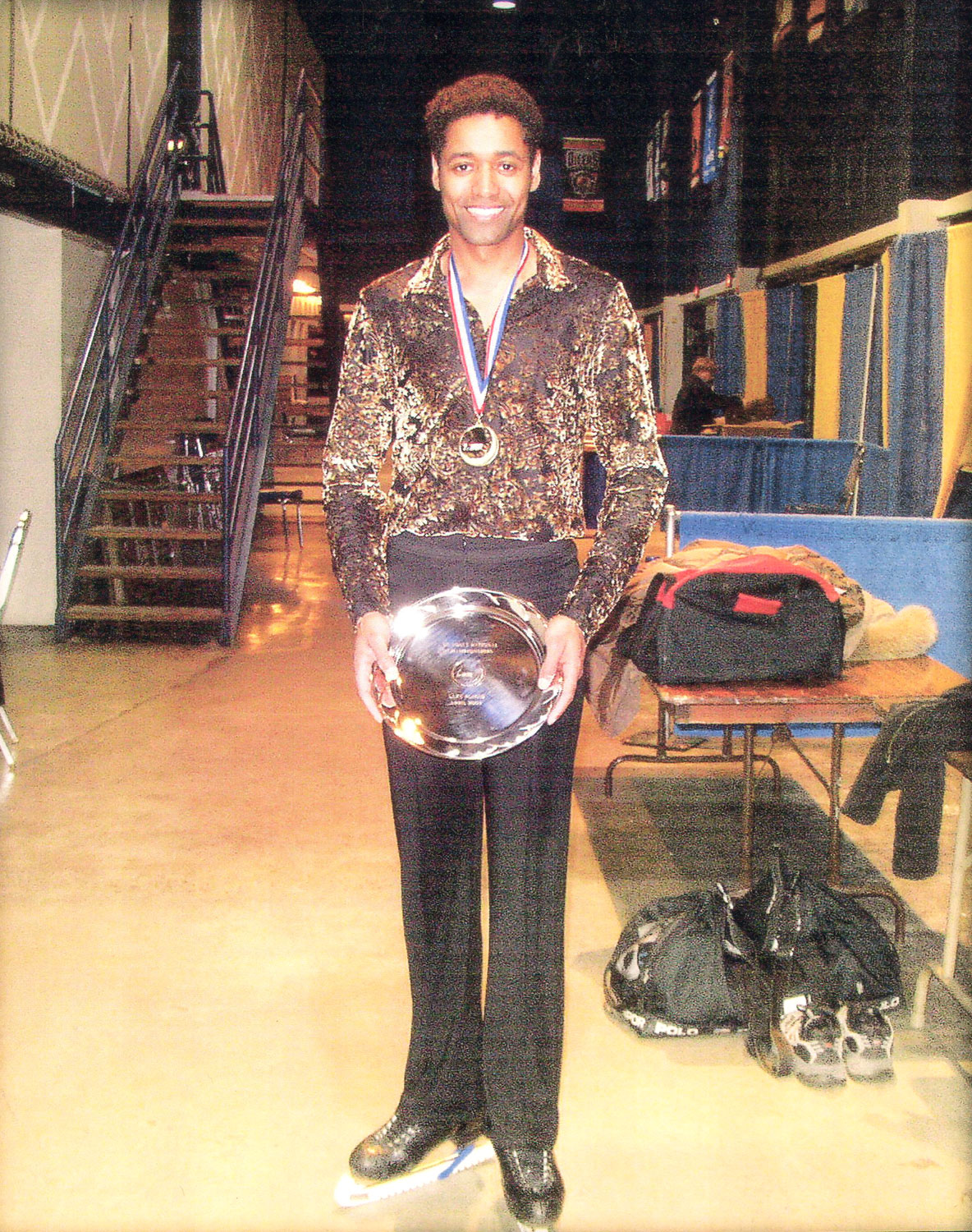
Backstage at the 2004 U.S. Adult Championships - Lake Placid, New York

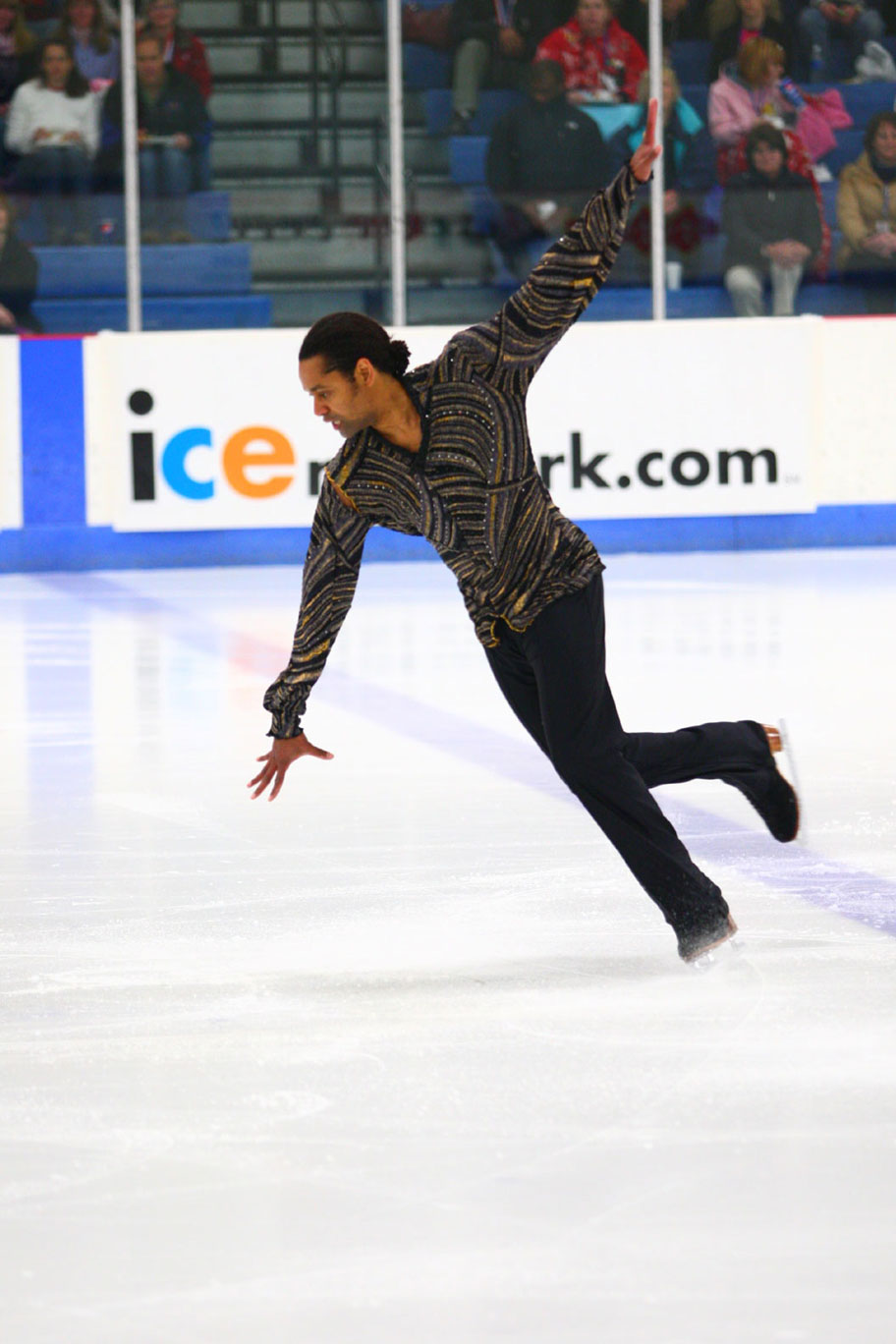
2009 U.S. Adult Championships Grand Rapids, Michigan

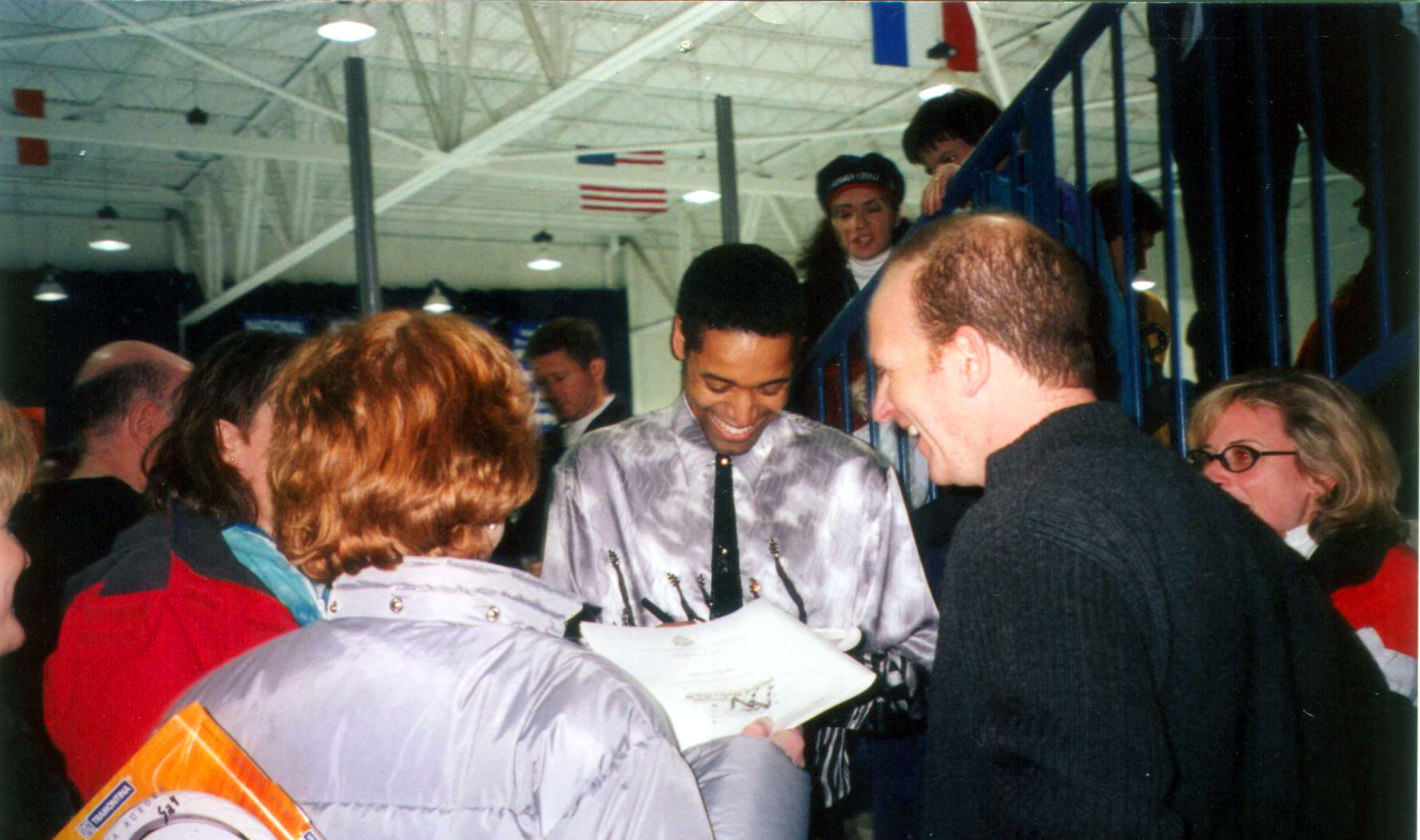
Signing autographs at the 2002 U.S. Adult Championships, Ann Arbor, Michigan

Larry Holliday (born July 5, 1964 in Chicago, Illinois) is an American figure skater. He is the six time U.S. Adult Championship Masters Men Champion, and he was a member of Team USA in 1990.

== Adult skating career ==
At the 2002 U.S. Adult National Figure Skating Championships in Ann Arbor, Michigan, he became the first skater to successfully land a triple jump in the Championship Masters event. In doing so, he won his first National title, and "earned a place in figure skating history".

In February 2003 Holliday co-directed the second edition of Ebony On Ice at the Auditorium Theater in Chicago, Illinois. Nine time French Champion and five time European Ladies Champion Surya Bonaly was the special guest skater. After the show ended, Holliday began intensive training for the 2003 Adult Championships where he won again. His program included two triple jumps.

At the 2004 U.S. Adult Championships in Lake Placid, New York, held at the Herb Brooks Arena, Holliday won his third consecutive title. Skating under the 6.0 system, Holliday received a high technical mark of 5.5 and a high artistic mark of 5.6. He included three triple jumps in his program.

Holliday had to watch the 2005 U.S. Adult Championships from the stands with a brace on his right leg. One week before the Championships, Holliday broke his leg and was forced to undergo surgery to repair the patellar tendon, missing two years of competition. Returning to competition Holliday won the silver medal in 2007 and the bronze medal in 2008 at the U.S. Adult Championships. Finally at the 2009 U.S. Adult Championships in Grand Rapids, Michigan, Holliday regained the National title. At the 2010 U. S. Adult Championships in Bloomington, Minnesota Holliday successfully defended, and captured his fifth title with a score of 49.56. A mere 0.25 separated the top 3 medalists.

On April 14, 2012 at the 2012 U.S. Adult Championships, in Bensenville, Illinois, Holliday won his sixth national title. Skating to "While My Guitar Gently Weeps", Holliday had an emotional win and a score of 51.55.

The Championship junior-senior men's event at the 2013 U.S. Adult Figure Skating Championships in Scottsdale, Arizona, featured a triple jump for the first time in years, with Holliday landing a triple Salchow. Unfortunately mounting mistakes later in the program kept him from defending the title.

Skating to Casablanca, Holliday won the Open Master Senior Men gold medal at the 2014 U.S. Adult Figure Skating Championships with his highest point total to date 56.55. In the Championship Junior-Senior Men event he won the pewter medal finishing in 4th place, only .11 points from the bronze. The event was held in Hyannis, Massachusetts.

Outskirts Press published "The Larry Holliday Story" in 2008.

Holliday currently coaches at McFetridge Sports Center in Chicago, Illinois.

== Early skating career ==
Holliday began skating in December 1976 after seeing an outdoor ice rink (Lake Shore Park) from the 72nd floor of a friends apartment in the John Hancock Center. In April 1977, Holliday began training at the Rainbo Ice Arena on Clark St. in Chicago. He attended classes there and met his first skating coach Jim Maier, who taught him all the basics of the sport, and gave him an excellent foundation to rise to the top. Holliday made his first National appearance at the 1982 United States Figure Skating Championships held in Indianapolis, Indiana at the Market Square Arena. He competed in the Novice Men event and finished in 5th place, behind 12-year-old gold medalist Rudy Galindo.

In 1987, Holliday was invited to train in the Denver suburb of Littleton, Colorado with Norma Sahlin, the famed coach of World Champions Jill Trenary and Charlie Tickner. During his stay, Alex English of the Denver Nuggets became his mentor/sponsor, and by 1990 he had a top 10 finish in the nation, which earned him a spot on the U.S. National Team (Team USA).

A very high jumper throughout his career, Holliday's jumps were measured at 37 inches high in 1990.

At the 1990 United States Figure Skating Championships, held at the Salt Palace in Salt Lake City, Utah, Holliday skated in the final National Championships where the Compulsory figures event was combined with the short and long programs. He finished in 12th place in the Compulsory figures event and 10th overall. His overall 10th-place finish at the Nationals qualified him for the 1990 U.S. Olympic Festival competition, held at the Met Center in Bloomington, Minnesota July 7–8, 1990.

During the summer of 1990 a group of sponsors put forth a major effort to get Holliday to the 1992 Winter Olympics. There were dozens of articles on Holliday, countless radio spots, and at least four different television reports, including a segment on the Today show (Sportsman of the Week, narrated by Deborah Norville). Father George Clements and Alderman Danny K. Davis (29th Ward) championed Holliday's cause, even Chicago's Mayor Richard M. Daley met the skater and donated $250 to his training expenses. The Park District agreed to let Holliday skate for free at the McFetridge Sports Complex, which had the only indoor skating rink in the city. Although the waived charges were only a couple of dollars, they made a difference to Holliday, and the Independence Bank of Chicago, a black-owned south-side institution, agreed to hold donations in a special "Larry Holliday Olympic Fund."

Holliday was invited to skate in the 1991 U.S. Olympic Festival held at The Forum (Inglewood) in July 1991. He finished in 7th place at that event. By the summer of 1991 more sponsors came out in support of Holliday's cause. The business man Robert Crown from a wealthy Chicago family agreed to donate $20,000 toward Holliday's training expenses. From the generosity of the prominent businessman from Chicago, Holliday and his coach Les Hanson set out for the East Coast in the month of October. Since the U.S. Nationals were to be held in Orlando, Florida at the Amway Arena in January 1992, coach Hanson thought it would be wise to get better acquainted with the east coast judges and competitors through a series of exhibitions. The first stop was Clearwater, Florida, then progressed on to Providence, Rhode Island, Philadelphia, Pennsylvania, and ended in New York City. Holliday qualified for the National Championships that year and finished in 13th place. Holliday's 4th National appearance was at the 1993 U.S. Figure Skating Championships, held at the US Airways Center in Phoenix, Arizona.

Holliday's 5th and final National appearance was at the 1994 United States Figure Skating Championships, held at the Joe Louis Arena and as memorable as that event was (the attack on Nancy Kerrigan) for Holliday the competition was forgettable. He withdrew after skating the short program citing severe knee pain.

== Recognition ==
In November 2021 Skating Magazine named Larry one of 100 contributors that made a significant contribution to the sport, during the 100th anniversary of U.S. Figure Skating.

== Competitive highlights ==
United States Adult National Championships
Event	2002	2003	2004	2005	2006	2007	2008	2009	2010	2011	2012	2013	2014	2015	2016
Masters Men	1st	1st	1st	DNC	DNC	2nd	3rd	1st	1st	DNC	1st	5th	4th	5th	4th
Open Masters Men													1st	2nd	1st
United States Adult Midwestern Championships
Event	2002	2003	2004	2005	2006	2007	2008	2009	2010	2011	2012	2013	2014	2015	2016
Masters Men	1st	1st	2nd	1st	DNC	1st	1st	1st	2nd	DNC	3rd	3rd	3rd	4th	4th
ISU International Masters Men
Event	2019														
Lake Placid	1st														

== Programs ==
Season	Free skating
2014	Casablanca (film) by Max Steiner orch. Royal Philharmonic Orchestra
2013	Concierto de Aranjuez by Joaquin Rodrigo orch. Eugen Cicero
2012	While My Guitar Gently Weeps by George Harrison orch. Steve Gray
2011	Did not compete
2010	Black Magic Woman by Carlos Santana
2009	Stairway to Heaven by Led Zeppelin orch. London Symphony Orchestra
2008	Kurt Atterberg Symphony No. 1 in B minor
2007	Bullitt (soundtrack) by Lalo Schifrin
2006	Did not compete
2005	The Perfect Storm (film) by James Horner
2004	The Right Stuff by Bill Conti
2003	Saturday Night Fever (soundtrack) by Bee Gees
2002	James Bond The World Is Not Enough by David Arnold
