= Mary Scotvold =

American figure skating coach

- Born: United States
- Occupation: Figure skating coach
- Known for: Winter Olympic Games

Mary Batdorf Scotvold is an American figure skating coach, best known for her work with Olympic medalists Paul Wylie and Nancy Kerrigan, whom she co-coached with her husband, Evy Scotvold.

She won the novice ladies title at the 1959 U.S. Figure Skating Championships. She later skated with Ice Follies and was married to former U.S. pair champion Ronald Ludington, for a time. In the mid-1970s, after separating from Ludington, she began coaching at the Wagon Wheel rink in Rockton, Illinois, where her pupils included a young Scott Hamilton. It was there that she teamed up with Evy Scotvold. They coached in Janesville, Wisconsin for a time before relocating to the Boston area in 1986. They semi-retired and coached part-time in Jacksonville, Florida. Evy died in 2021.

In addition to Wylie and Kerrigan, the Scotvolds also coached 2000 World Junior champion Jennifer Kirk. Mary was known primarily as the choreographer on the team rather than as a technical coach.

Mary's twin sister Anne Batdorf Militano is also a skating coach and former competitive skater.

== Results ==
| Event | 1959 |
|---|---|
| U.S. Championships | 1st N. |
