= An Evening with Champions =

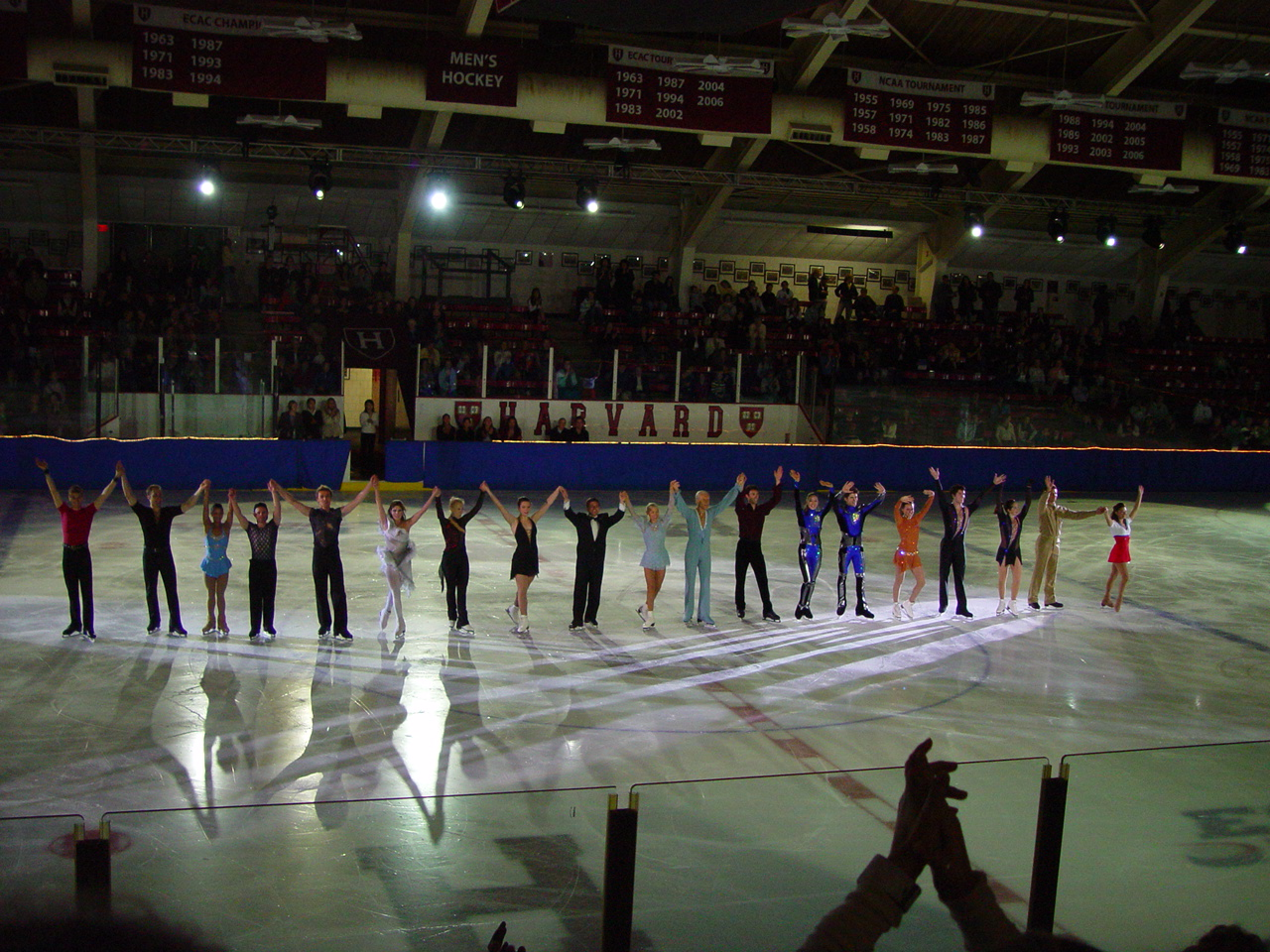
Cast of the 2007 show of An Evening with Champions.

An Evening with Champions (EWC) is an annual benefit figure skating show organized by students of Harvard University. The show is a two-day event and typically takes place in October, regularly attracting world-class skaters, thousands of spectators, hundreds of Harvard students, special guests, and donors. The show is entirely student-run and is managed completely by volunteer work. All profits go to the Jimmy Fund, one of New England's most cherished charities, and EWC is one of the oldest fundraising events for the charity. The Jimmy Fund supports pediatric and adult cancer research and treatment at Dana–Farber Cancer Institute. An Evening with Champions has donated over $2.9 million to the Jimmy Fund.

== History ==
The show was originally conceived in 1970 by Olympic figure skater John Misha Petkevich, a two-time Olympic competitor who was a junior at Harvard, living in Eliot House, which became (and has remained) the official host of the show. The show has been continually produced every fall since 1970, with the exception of a special spring show in April 2010, commemorating the 40th anniversary of EWC.

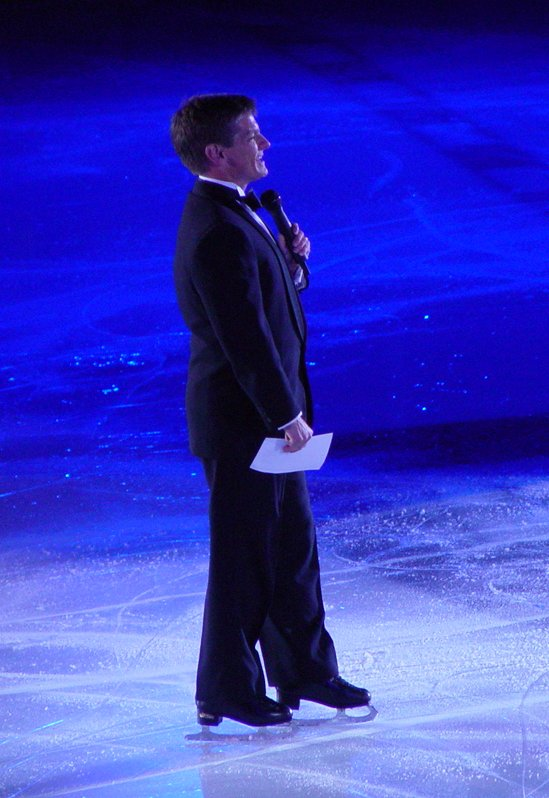
Paul Wylie hosting the 2007 show.

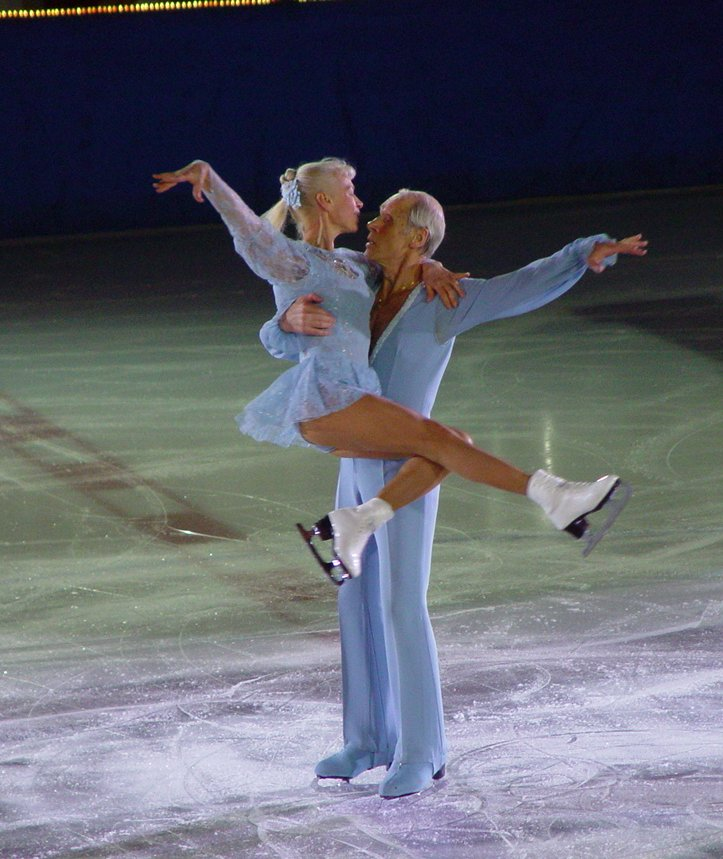
Ludmila and Oleg Protopopov in the 2007 show.

Many current and former U.S. and international champions and Olympic competitors have appeared in the show over the years. The show usually features a mix of up-and-coming elite competitors and established champions. Past shows' skaters have included Scott Hamilton, Kristi Yamaguchi, Brian Boitano, Paul Wylie, Michelle Kwan, Ilia Kulik, Ekaterina Gordeeva, Ludmilla Belousova and Oleg Protopopov, Oksana Baiul, Nancy Kerrigan, Yuna Kim, Nathan Chen, Johnny Weir, Madison Hubbell and Zachary Donohue, and the Haydenettes synchronized skating team who have made EWC their opening appearance for many years. Paul Wylie, himself a former resident of Eliot House, has generally hosted the show since 1998. Beginning in 2011, Wylie has been joined by Emily Hughes as Co-Host. Ludmila Belousova and Oleg Protopopov, two-time Olympic Champions, have also had a particularly long association with the show and continue to make annual appearances.

The show was televised on PBS for 25 years until the broadcaster ended the partnership in 2001. More recently, it had been televised on the Comcast Network cable channel CN8.

Beginning in 2012, EWC launched "Skating with Champions", a fundraising initiative in which fans can fundraise solo or in a team to win an invitation to perform in the show alongside the main cast.

== 40th An Evening with Champions ==
The 2010 show of An Evening with Champions celebrated the 40th anniversary of the charity with a special spring show taking place on April 16 and 17, 2010, as opposed to a show in the fall. The main cast included Olympians Mark Ladwig and Amanda Evora, two-time Olympic champions Ludmila Belousova and Oleg Protopopov, and Olympian (and Harvard student) Emily Hughes. Many former Olympians and national champions joined the main cast to celebrate the anniversary, including Sarah Hughes, Paul Wylie, and Dorothy Hamill. The show was co-hosted by Peggy Fleming and Dick Button, who temporarily replaced Wylie.
