= Holly Cook =

American figure skater

Figure skating career
- Country: United States
- Coach: Kris Sherard
- Retired: 1991
Medal record
Representing the United States
Figure skating: Ladies' singles
World Championships
Bronze medal – third place	1990 Halifax	Ladies' singles

Holly Faye Cook-Tanner is an American former competitive figure skater. She is the 1990 World and 1990 U.S. national bronze medalist. She was coached by Kris Sherard.

Cook is a member of the Church of Jesus Christ of Latter-day Saints. She is a graduate of Viewmont High School in Bountiful, Utah, class of 1989. She is a mother of four and toured with Champions on Ice. She now coaches at the South Davis Recreation Center in Bountiful, Utah.

== Competitive highlights ==
International
Event	84–85	85–86	86–87	87–88	88–89	89–90	90–91
Worlds						3rd	
Inter. de Paris						2nd	
Nebelhorn Trophy			1st				
NHK Trophy			4th				
Skate America					4th		
Skate Canada							3rd
Skate Electric							1st
National
U.S. Champ.	3rd J		8th	6th	4th	3rd	6th
J = Junior level
