= Alice Sue Claeys =

Belgian Figure Skater

Personal information
- Born: 24 February 1975 (age 51) Atlanta, Georgia, United States

Figure skating career
- Country: Belgium; United States
- Retired: 1999

Alice Sue Claeys (born February 24, 1975) is a former competitive figure skater. Representing Belgium, she won silver at the 1992 Skate Canada International and finished in the top ten at three ISU Championships — the 1992 World Junior Championships (4th), the 1992 World Championships (7th), and the 1993 European Championships (8th).

== Personal life ==
Claeys was born in Atlanta, Georgia. At age 11, she moved with her family to Minnesota and became a student at Burnsville High School. She began studying at the University of Minnesota at age 14.

== Skating career ==
Claeys trained in Atlanta and Janesville, Wisconsin until she was 11 and then trained in Minnesota. She won the junior ladies' title at the 1990 U.S. Championships.

Claeys began representing Belgium in the 1991–92 season. After placing fourth behind Chen Lu at the World Junior Championships in Hull, Quebec, she was named in the Belgian team to the 1992 European Championships. Making her senior ISU Championship debut, she finished 11th at the event in Lausanne, Switzerland. She then placed seventh, between Tonya Harding and Yuka Sato, at the 1992 World Championships in Oakland, California.

In the 1992–93 season, Claeys won silver at the 1992 Skate Canada International, placed sixth at the 1992 NHK Trophy and fifth at the 1992 Grand Prix International de Paris. She ranked eighth at the 1993 European Championships in Helsinki. At the 1993 World Championships in Prague, she placed 21st in the short program and withdrew from the competition.

The 1993–94 season was less successful for Claeys. She finished 16th at the 1994 European Championships and 19th at the 1994 World Championships.

Claeys represented the United States at the 1997 Winter Universiade, where she finished sixth.

== Competitive highlights ==
International
Event	89–90	90–91	91–92 (BEL)	92–93 (BEL)	93–94 (BEL)	94–95	95–96 (USA)	96–97 (USA)	97–98 (USA)	98–99 (USA)
Worlds			7th	WD	19th					
Europeans			11th	8th	16th					
Int. de Paris				5th	12th					
NHK Trophy				6th						
Skate Canada				2nd						
Universiade								6th		
International: Junior
Junior Worlds			4th							
National
Belgian Champ.										
U.S. Champ.	1st J						10th		WD	17th
Eastern Sect.									2nd	4th
Midwestern Sect.							3rd			
J = Junior level; WD = Withdrew
