= STARskaters =

- Founded: 2008
- Founder: Jim O'Neill
- Type: Non-profit Organization
- Location: Houston, Texas
- Region served: United States
- Product: Skating for Therapy and Recreation
- Key people: Jim O'Neill, B.L. Wylie, Reid Williams, Lilia Quintana, David Seto
- Website: http://www.starskaters.org/

STARskaters.org, a US Paralympic Sport Club, was founded by Sugar Land, Texas businessman Jim O'Neill in 2008. The organization is composed of Houston area volunteers, many of whom are hockey players, skating instructors, figure skaters, coaches and officials.

== History ==
The first version of the STARskaters website went live on May 1, 2008. The Maple Leaf Pub in Houston hosted the first fundraising event on July 26 of 2008, and the first skating event was held at the Willowbrook Aerodrome on August 2 of 2008.

The original concept was to hold quarterly STAR skates for organizations who provide services for individuals with disabilities, but the scope of the program quickly expanded to also include Sled Hockey. On February 14, 2009, the first "Sled Hockey Weekend" was held to recruit players and raise awareness of the sport in Houston.

The first STAR skate for ARC of Fort Bend County was held on May 15, 2010 and was the first STARskaters event held at the Sugar Land Ice & Sports Center. This event lead to the first special needs skating lessons which started in September 18, 2010.

The special needs skating lessons were noticed by B.L. Wylie, the Parent Education Coordinator for the U.S. Figure Skating instructional program at Sugar Land Ice & Sports Center. As the mother of Olympic Medalist Paul Wylie and a veteran instructor for U.S. Figure Skating, B.L. had always envisioned creating a skating program for individuals with disabilities. In October 2010 she took over as Director of the program which is currently known as SkateTherapy.org which has become a model program for rinks across the country for instruction of disabled skaters.

Today, between the STAR skates, SkateTherapy, Sled Hockey programs, as well as outreach and community involvement, more than 130 events are held annually.

== Mission ==
STARskaters mission is to provide an on-ice experience for individuals with disabilities through their STAR skates, SkateTherapy and Sled Hockey programs.

== Paralympic Sport Club status ==
In June 2011, STARskaters was invited to apply for status as a US Paralympic Sport Club.

Sports clubs are community-based sports organizations developed to involve youth and adults with physical and visual disabilities in ongoing sports and physical activity, regardless of skill level. They also serve as a pipeline to develop athletes for competition in the Paralympic games held every two years following the Olympic games.

After a review of the STARskaters program, Sport Club status was granted on July 21 of 2011. The first Paralympic Experience event was held at Ice Skate USA at Memorial City Mall on May 12, 2012 with Andy Yohe, Captain of the 2010 Gold Medal US Sled Hockey team participated in a "try Sled Hockey" event and provided instruction, skills, and drills for players from Houston and Austin.

== Organization structure ==
STARskaters is a 501(c)(3) non profit and 100% volunteer organization. A board of directors oversees all of the programs as well as advisory boards for both the Sled Hockey and SkateTherapy programs.

=== Board of directors ===
- President – Jim O'Neill
- Vice President - T.C. Lewis
- Vice President, Sled Hockey – Andy Toppin
- Secretary – Lilia Quintana
- Treasurer - David Seto

== Program details ==
STAR skates – Skating events held by request for organizations who service the disabled community. Events are held at area rinks for schools, service organizations and area US Paralympic Sport Clubs and youth wheelchair summer camp events.

Sled Hockey – A Paralympic sport, Sled Hockey is played by the same rules as stand-up hockey but with players sitting in specially designed sleds. They propel themselves with sticks which have picks on the end to dig into the ice.

SkateTherapy – A program designed to provide stand-up skating instruction for individuals with a broad range of physical and developmental disabilities. The program follows the U.S. Figure Skating 14 level badge program, and the program, started in Sugar Land, TX has become a model for other program development around the United States.

=== The Ice Cruiser and Jessie Chan ===
In October 2013, at age 17, Jessie Chan's opportunity to share the gift and passion of skating with others, presented itself in the form of a blind Skate Therapy student too terrified to take the ice, she had her chance.

5 months later, Jessie debuted her first original invention, the Ice Cruiser, a unique 360 degree walker that aids beginning skaters and those with physical and mental disabilities in learning how to skate independently. The multi-storied structure and all-around barrier design provides skaters with both the freedom and security to roam across the ice without the fear of loss of balance or direct collision with anyone or anything.

Jessie holds a provisional patent for the Ice Cruiser. She worked with volunteers from the SkateTherapy program to develop the first small and medium-sized Ice Cruisers for the program.

=== Kyle Huckaby ===
When Kyle about 9, he started playing goalie in roller hockey, sitting on the floor playing against able-bodied players. This helped him begin to sharpen his hockey skills. Later when an ECHL hockey team came to the Beaumont area, he played goalie at a few junior practices. Again, sitting on the ice to play in goal against the able-bodied players. Kyle finally got his first sled when some adult hockey players were able to get a local refinery to donate money to purchase a hockey sled. However, he was only able to play in the sled a couple of times before the ECHL team left in 2008 and they no longer had ice.

Kyle didn't play hockey on ice again until he was introduced to STARskaters at the Metal & Muscle Expo in Houston in the fall of 2011. After that meeting Kyle and his family made the long drive from Beaumont to Houston every weekend where Kyle started the day on the ice with Sled Hockey, then on to Wheelchair Basketball and other activities.

In April 2012, STARskaters invited Kyle to play goalie in the USA Hockey Disabled Festival in Dallas. It was the first National Tournament for STARskaters Sled Hockey team and Kyle did double duty, playing for both the Houston adult team and in the Junior division for a team from Minnesota. His stellar performance in goal caught the eye of JJ O'Connor of USA Disabled Hockey. Kyle was invited to the National Development Camp in New York, and subsequently was named to the USA National Development Sled Hockey team.

In addition to Sled Hockey Kyle played wheelchair basketball for TIRR Houston Hotwheels from 2010-2013, and won the 2013 NWBA Junior National Championship. He currently plays wheelchair basketball for the University of Texas Arlington where he is majoring in journalism.

STARskaters had a small part in Kyle's success. Kyle's success was mainly attributed to Kyle's family for their support, dedication and their hours on the road shuttling Kyle to his many sports activities and, Kyle himself for the hard work and dedication that took him from sitting on the floor of a roller hockey league in Beaumont to competing at the highest level of the sport against teams from all over the world.

=== USA Hockey Disabled Festival ===
STARskaters Sled Hockey team first competed in the USA Hockey Disabled festival April 13-15th, 2012. Players from Houston and Austin joined combined to win 3rd place in their first ever national competition.

In 2013 players from Houston and Dallas combined to participate in the Disabled Festival as the Texas STARS in Philadelphia, PA but failed to earn a medal. In 2014 at the tournament in Boston, Mass, the team finished in second place.

In 2015 the team went undefeated, outscoring their opponents 33–2 and won the championship of the national division.
