= Eliot House =

Residential House of Harvard College

- Residential House
- Harvard University
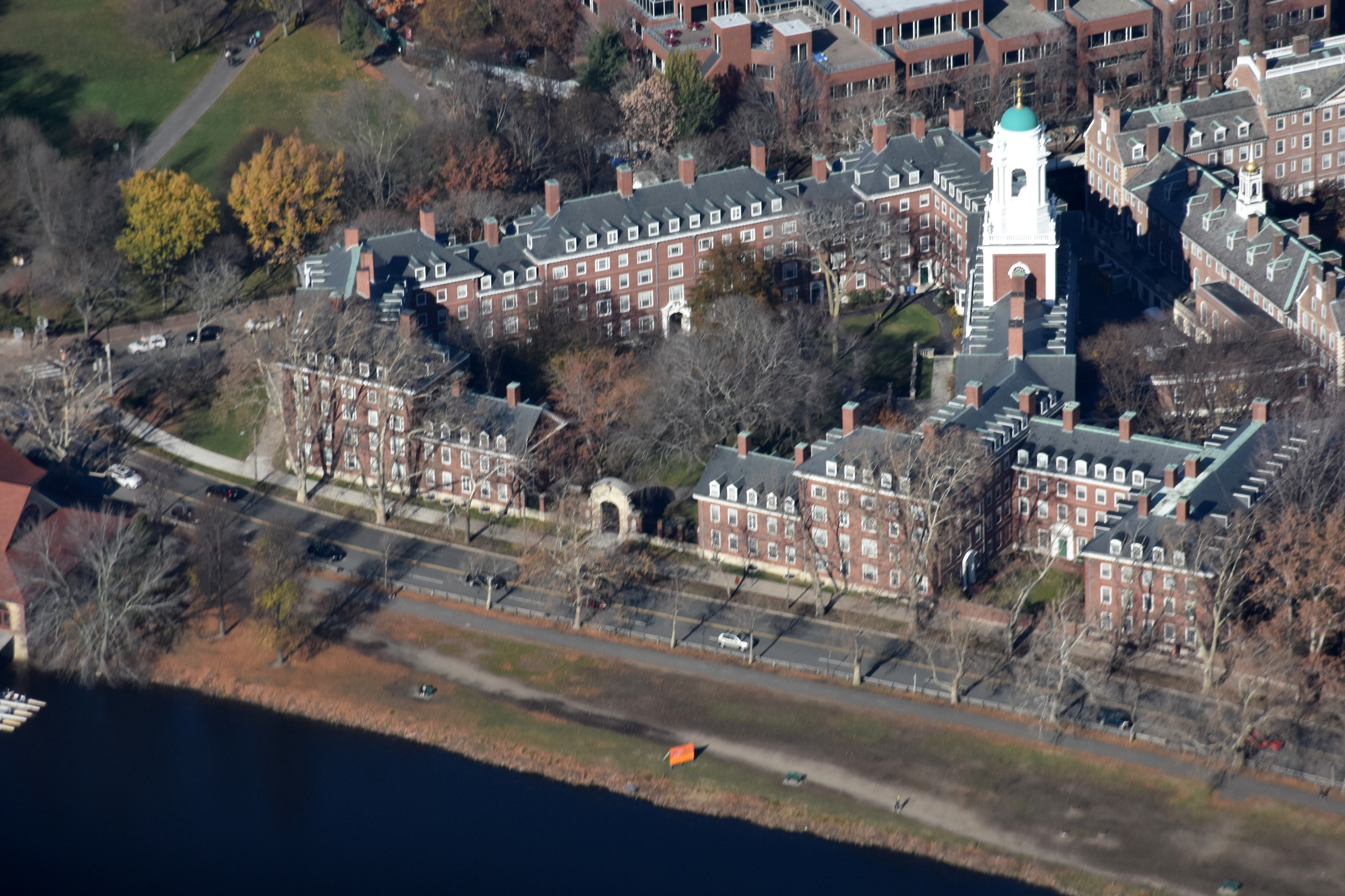
- Eliot House on the Charles River

- Shield
- Location: 101 Dunster Street, Cambridge, Massachusetts, U.S.
- Coordinates: 42°22′13″N 71°07′15″W
- Established: 1930
- Named for: Charles William Eliot
- Colours: Blue, Red, White
- Sister college: Jonathan Edwards College and Emmanuel College, Cambridge
- Faculty Deans: David Elmer and Bonnie Talbert
- Dean: Andrea Wright
- Undergraduates: 450
- Called: Eliotites
- Website: eliot.harvard.edu

Eliot House is one of twelve undergraduate residential houses at Harvard University. It is one of the seven original houses at the college. Opened in 1931, the house was named after Charles William Eliot, who served as president of the university for forty years (1869–1909).

== Traditions ==
Before Harvard opted to use a lottery system to assign residences to upperclassmen (beginning with the class of 1999), Eliot was known as a 'prep' house, providing accommodation to the university's social elite, and being known as "more Harvard than Harvard". Describing Eliot House in the late 1950s and early 1960s, author Alston Chase wrote, "[A]lthough most Harvard houses in those days reflected the values of Boston Brahmin society ... Eliot was more extreme".

The motto 'Floreat Domus de Eliot' and 'Domus' are traditional chants and greetings, particularly on Housing Day, when freshman find out their housing assignments. Some traditions of Eliot House are the charity event An Evening with Champions, the Eliot Boat Club (an intramural crew team), formal dinners such as the Charles Eliot Dinner, a strong sense of house pride, and the annual Spring Fete.

== Movie appearances ==
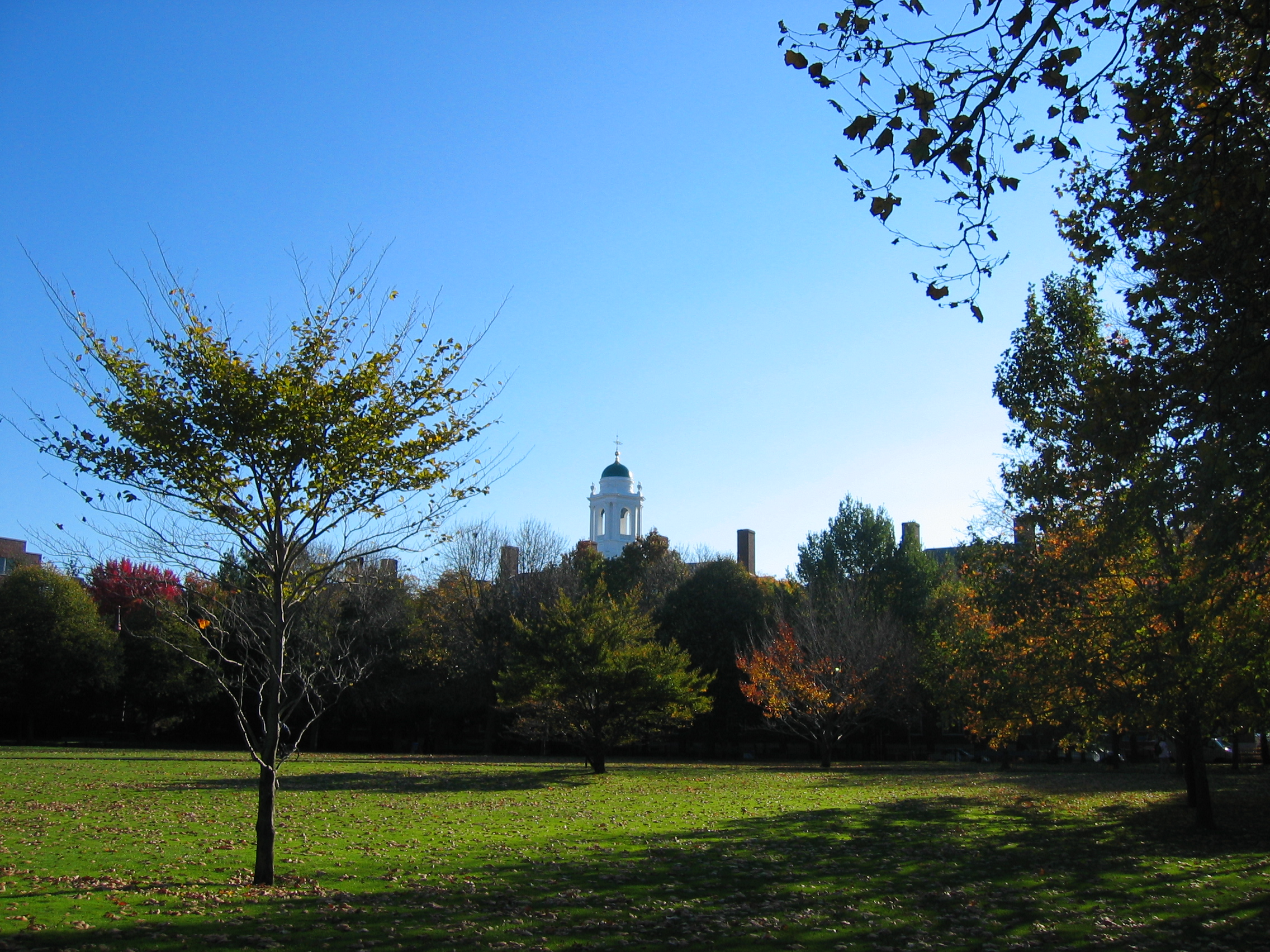
Eliot House cupola from JFK Park

Eliot's prominent cupola is featured in many films, including Old School; Legally Blonde; Chasing Liberty; and Euro Trip, which features the tower at the end of the film, incorrectly identifying it as Oberlin College. Eliot House is also featured prominently in Love Story and The Social Network.

== Notable alumni ==
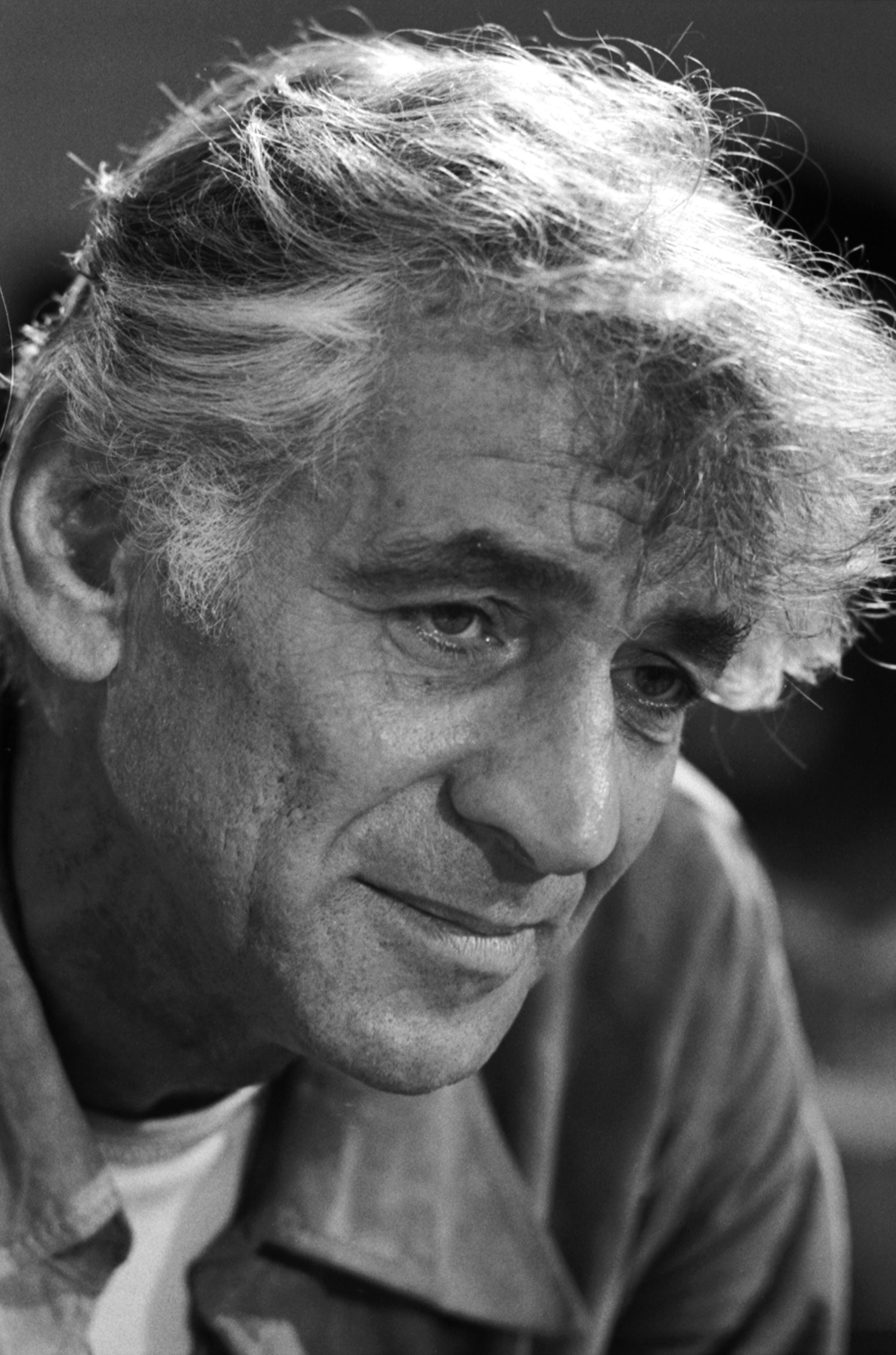
Leonard Bernstein

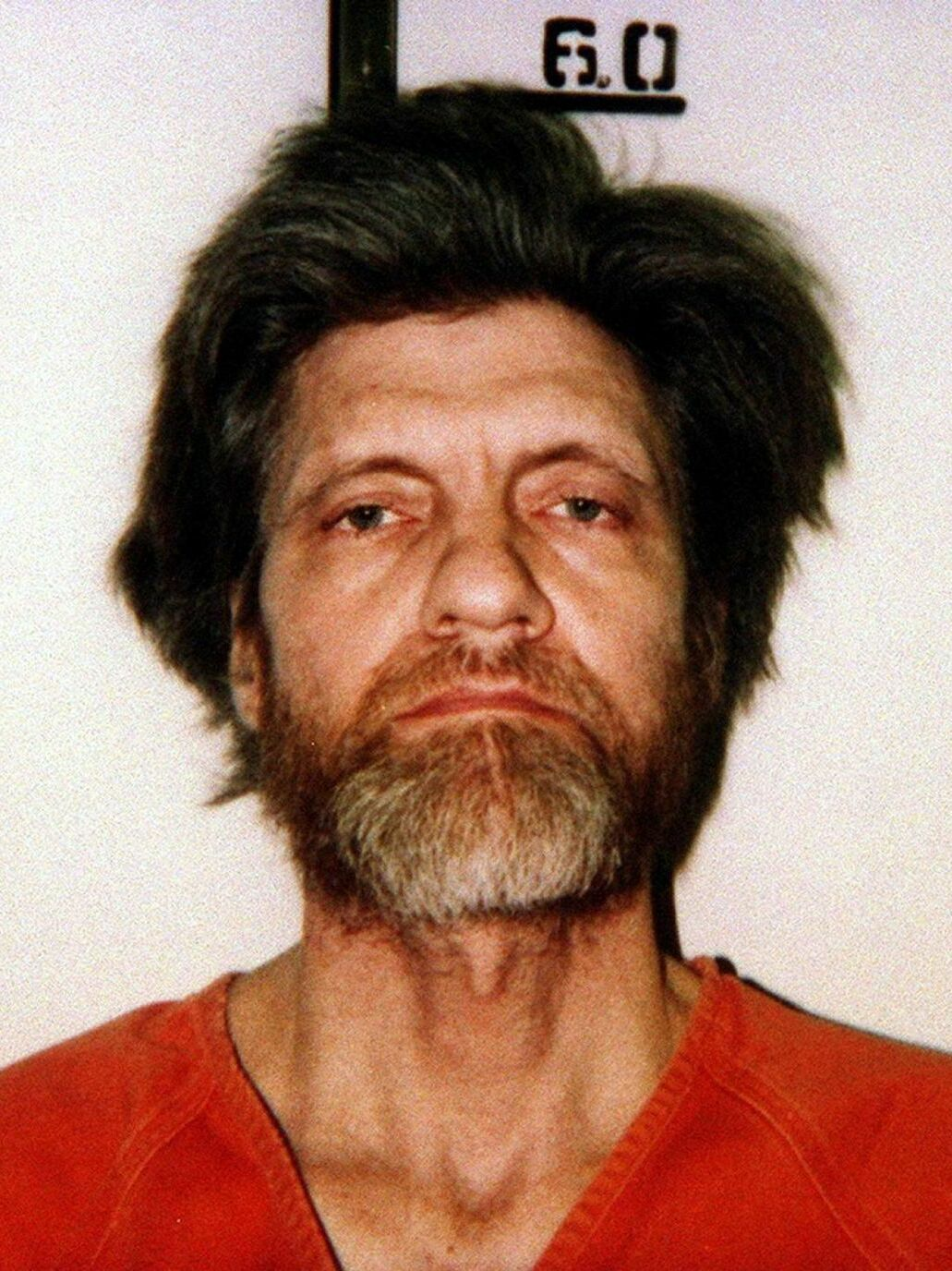
Ted Kaczynski

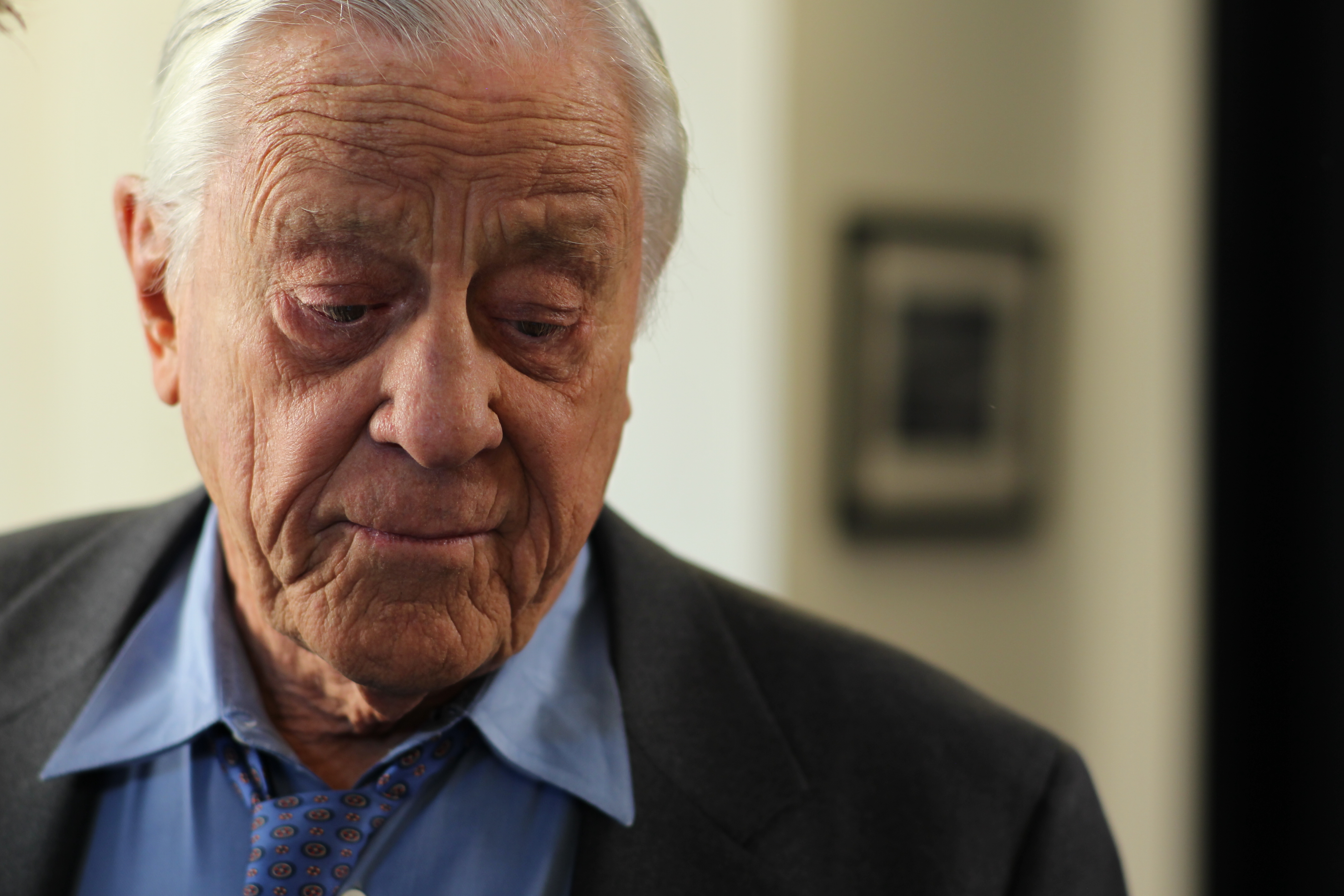
Ben Bradlee

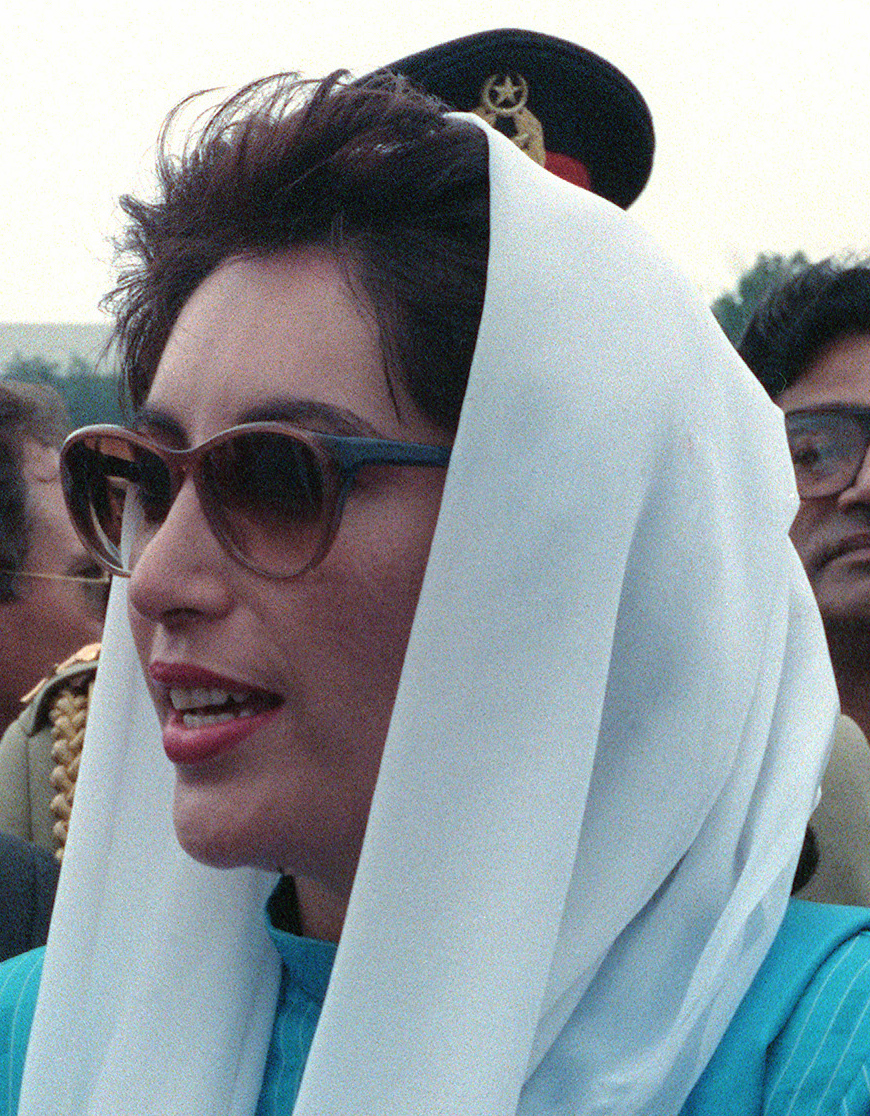
Benazir Bhutto

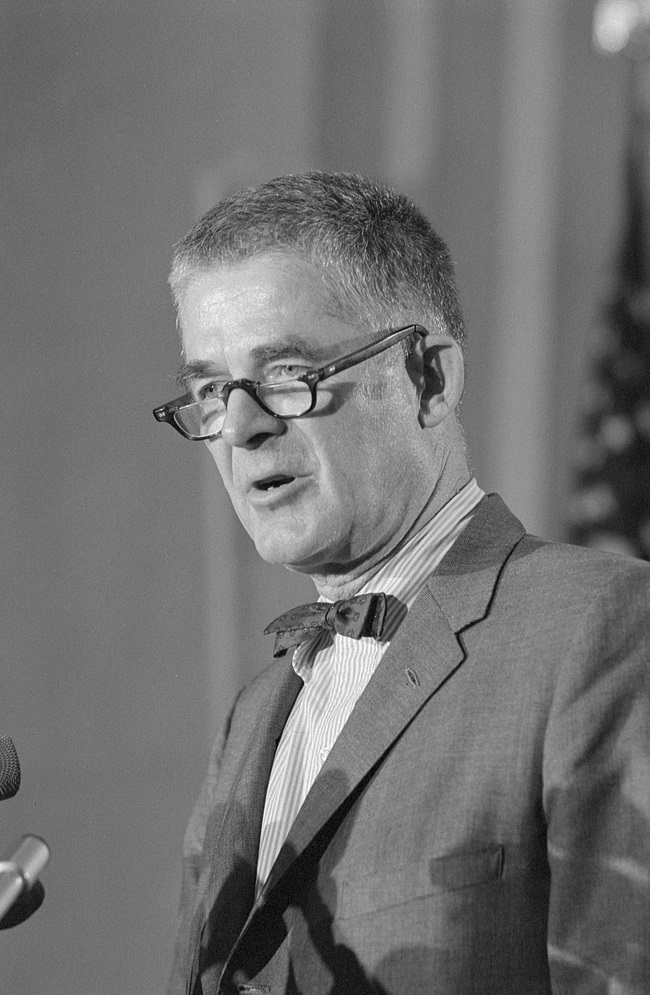
Archibald Cox

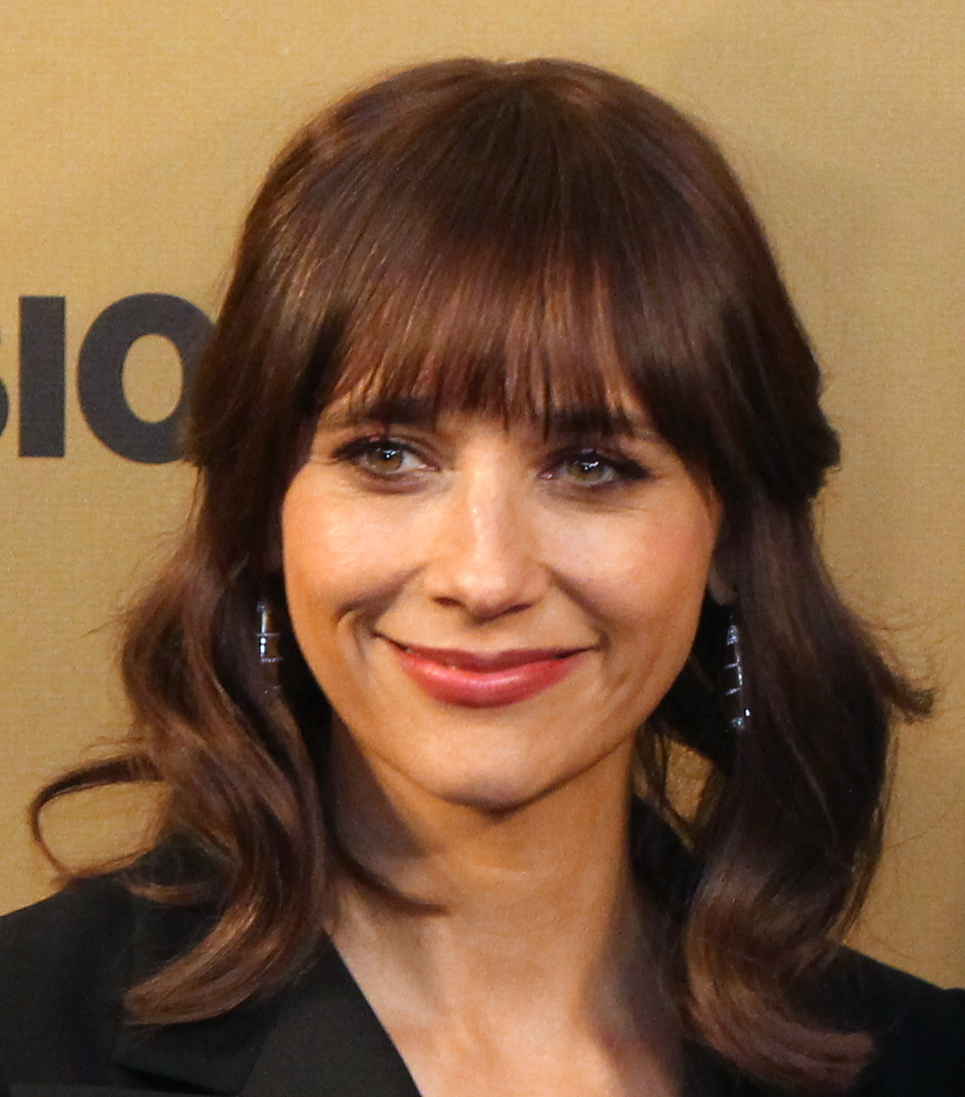
Rashida Jones

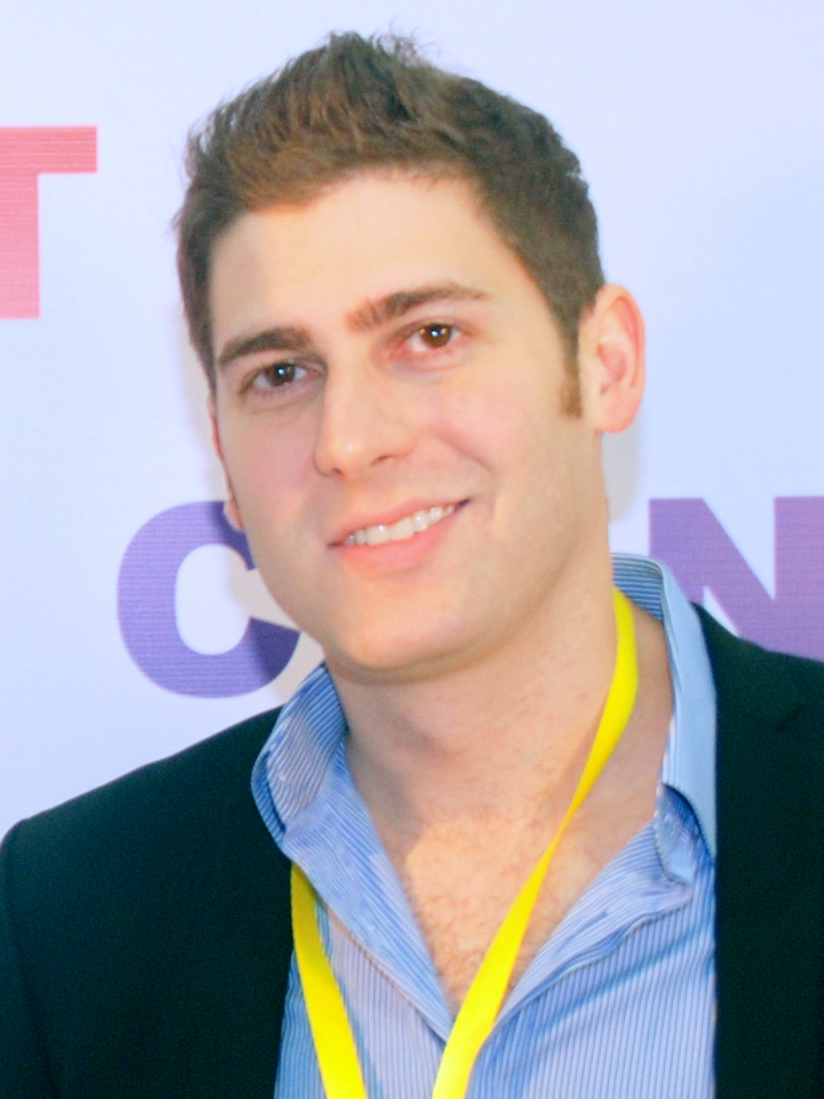
Eduardo Saverin

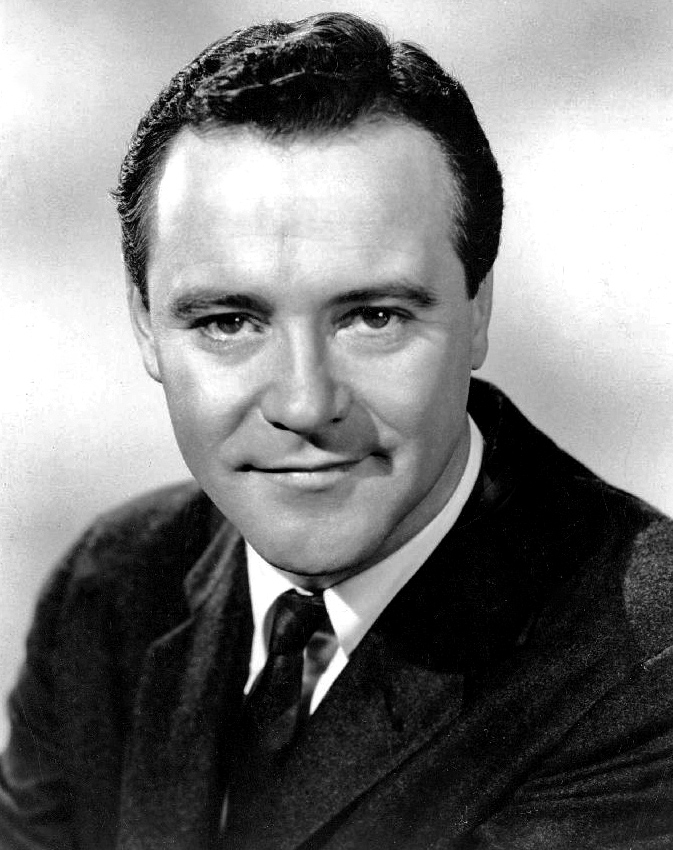
Jack Lemmon

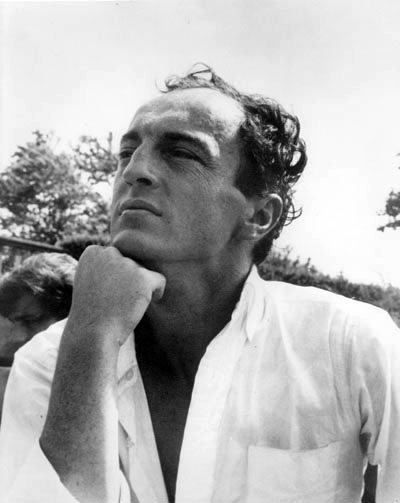
Frank O'Hara

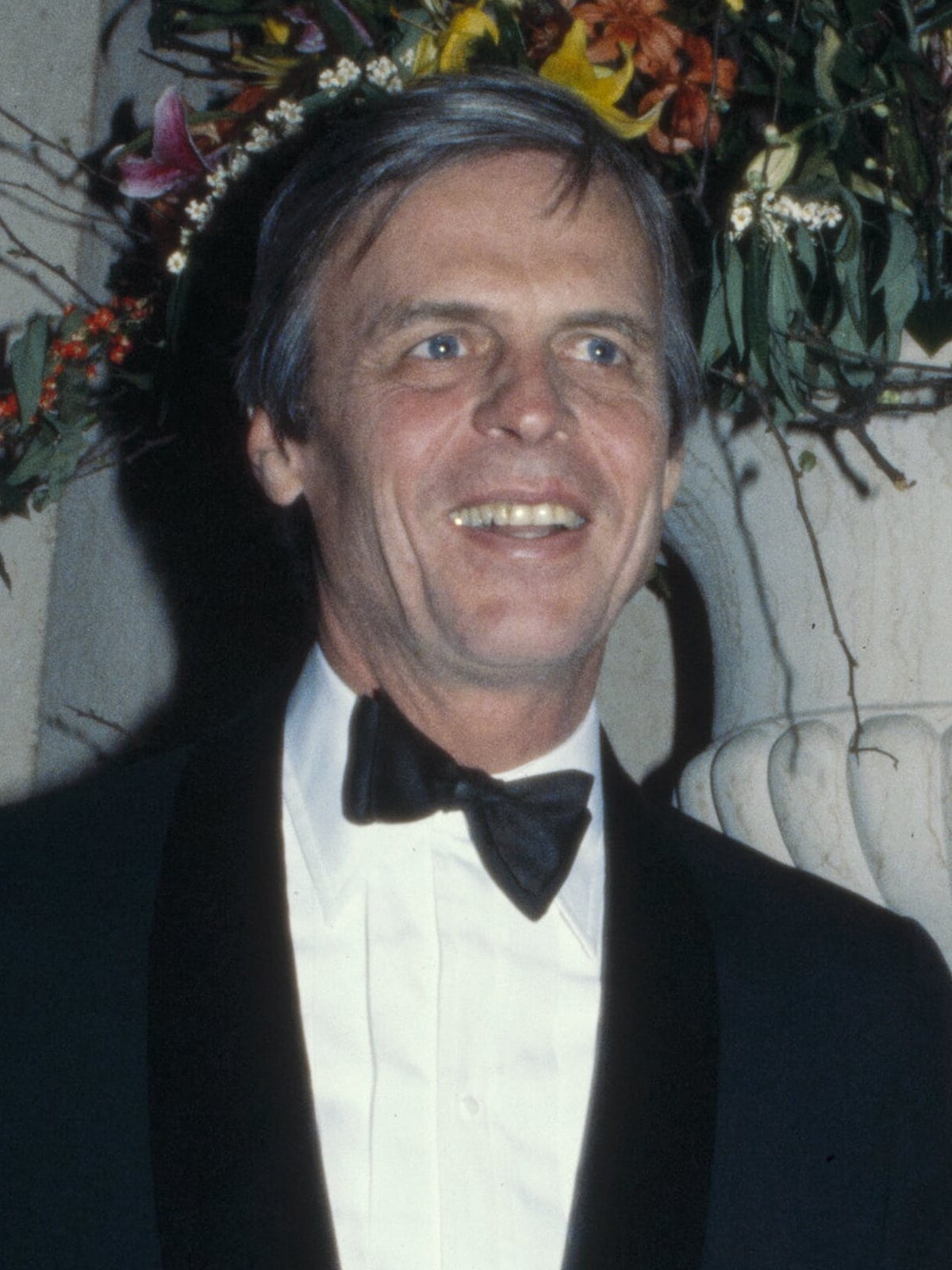
George Plimpton

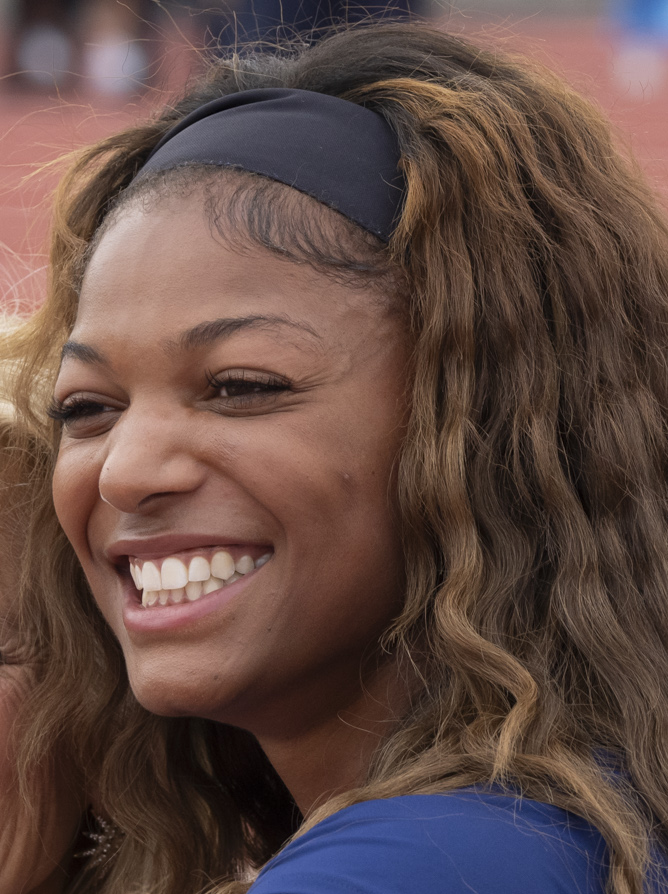
Gabby Thomas
