= Susan Wynne =

American figure skater and commentator

Susan Elizabeth Wynne (born March 6, 1965, in Syracuse, New York) is an American former ice dancer and current figure skating analyst and commentator. She competed at the 1988 Winter Olympics with Joseph Druar. The duo won the gold medal at the U.S. Figure Skating Championships twice. She later competed with Russ Witherby.

Since retiring from skating, she has worked as a television figure skating analyst for the Fox and ABC networks. She has also worked as a coach. She coached Ben Agosto early in his career.

Wynne grew up in Camillus, New York.

== Results ==
=== With Druar ===
International
Event	1981–82	1982–83	1983–84	1984–85	1985–86	1986–87	1987–88	1988–89	1989–90
Olympics							11th		
Worlds						12th	9th	5th	4th
Goodwill Games									3rd
Skate America		5th	8th					1st	
Skate Canada							6th		
Trophée de France							2nd	1st	
NHK Trophy					4th		3rd		
Golden Spin						1st			
Nebelhorn	7th								
Moscow News					9th				
National
U.S. Champ.	9th	5th	5th	5th	4th	3rd	2nd	1st	1st

=== With Witherby ===
International
Event	1992–1993	1993–1994
World Championships	15th	
Trophée de France		4th
Piruetten		4th
National
U.S. Championships	2nd	2nd

== Bibliography ==
- A Basic Guide to Figure Skating, United States Olympic Committee, 2002 ISBN 0-8368-3102-0
