= Joseph Druar =

American ice dancer (1962–2023)

Joseph Henry Druar (September 5, 1962 – July 27, 2023) was an American ice dancer. He competed at the 1988 Winter Olympics with Susie Wynne. The duo won the gold medal at the U.S. Figure Skating Championships twice.

Druar was born on September 5, 1962, and died from heart failure on July 27, 2023, at the age of 60.

== Results ==
(with Susie Wynne)

International
Event	1981–82	1982–83	1983–84	1984–85	1985–86	1986–87	1987–88	1988–89	1989–90
Olympics							11th		
Worlds						12th	9th	5th	4th
Goodwill Games									3rd
Skate America		5th	8th					1st	
Skate Canada							6th		
Trophée de France							2nd	1st	
NHK Trophy					4th		3rd		
Golden Spin						1st			
Nebelhorn	7th								
Moscow News					9th				
National
U.S. Champ.	9th	5th	5th	5th	4th	3rd	2nd	1st	1st
