= Paul Wylie =

American figure skater

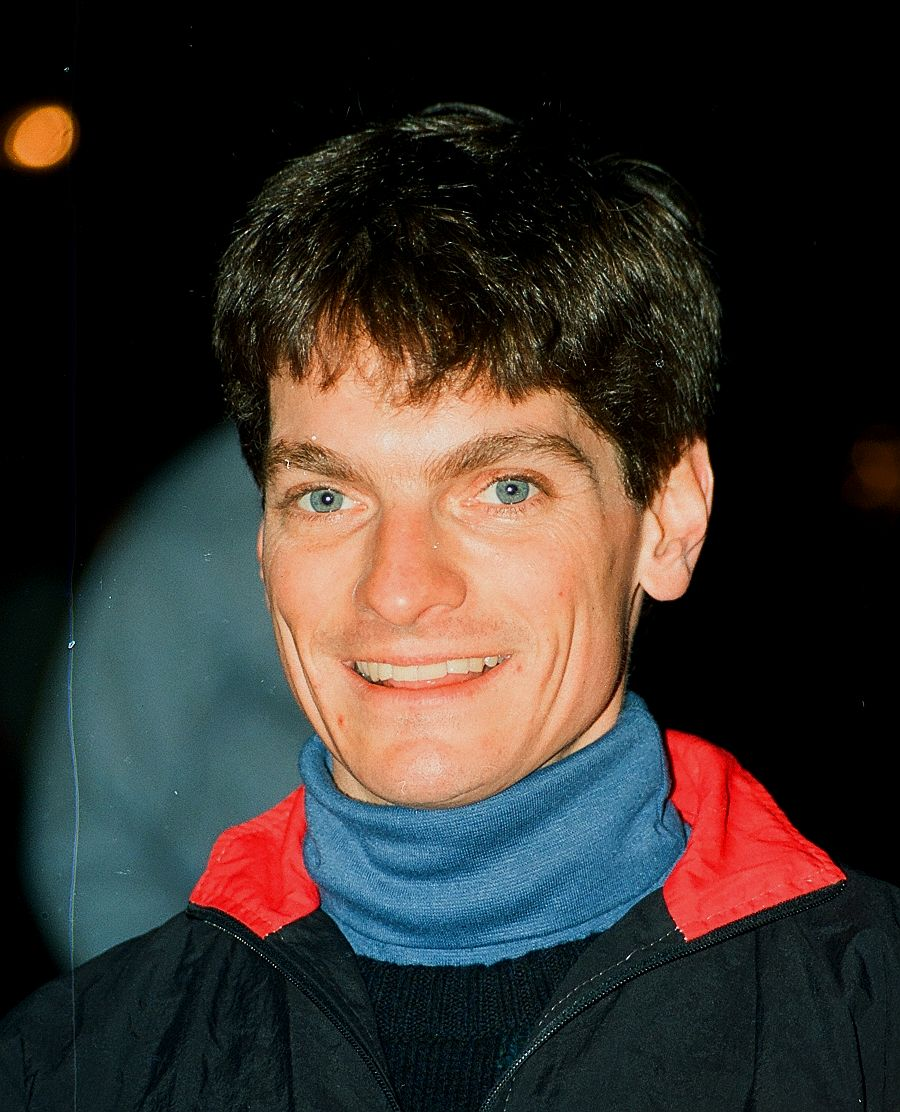
- Wylie in 1995

Personal information
- Born: October 24, 1964 (age 61) Dallas, Texas, United States

Figure skating career
- Country: United States
- Began skating: age 3
- Retired: 1992 (amateur); 1998 (pro)
Medal record
Men's Figure skating
Representing United States
Winter Olympics
Silver medal – second place	1992 Albertville	Men's singles
World Junior Championships
Gold medal – first place	1981 London	Men's singles

Paul Stanton Wylie (born October 28, 1964) is an American figure skater, and the 1992 Olympic silver medalist in men's singles skating.

== Personal life ==
Wylie was born on October 24, 1964, in Dallas, Texas, to Bob Wylie (a geophysicist) and B.L. Wylie (a realtor), the youngest of three children. In Dallas, he attended St. Mark's School of Texas. When he was eleven, his family moved to Denver, Colorado, where he focused increasingly on skating and graduated from Colorado Academy.

Wylie attended Harvard University and graduated in 1991 with a degree in government. After competing in the 1992 Winter Olympics, as he planned, he retired from amateur competition and began his professional skating career. It was his intention to tour for a few years and then go to law school. He was admitted to law school, but deferred attendance for a few years. He ended up skating professionally for six years before retiring. He then returned to Harvard — but to the Business School, rather than the Law School. He earned an MBA from Harvard Business School in 2000. He then worked for two years in marketing with The Walt Disney Company.

On August 14, 1999, Wylie married Kate Presbrey, a Cape Cod native and former Brown University Division 1 hockey player. They have three children, Hannah, Emma and Caleb. The family divides their time between Hyannis, Massachusetts, and Charlotte, North Carolina, where Wylie previously worked with the Billy Graham Evangelistic Association as director of the Dare to be a Daniel program. Wylie currently runs High Gear Travel, a sports-related travel agency, and coaches figure skaters at the Extreme Ice Center in Indian Trail, North Carolina, owned by Tom Logano, father of NASCAR star Joey Logano, whose sister Danielle is also a coach.

== Skating career ==
Wylie started skating at the age of three. After moving to Denver, he began to train with Carlo Fassi. Wylie remained with Fassi for nine years, first in Denver and later in Colorado Springs when Fassi relocated to the Broadmoor Skating Club. As a young skater, Wylie additionally worked with John Curry and Robin Cousins, who were also students of Fassi. Cousins lived with the Wylie family while he was training for the 1980 Winter Olympics.

In 1979, Wylie won the novice men's title at the U.S. Championships, and in the 1981 season, he won both the U.S. junior title and the World Junior Championships. At the latter event, he landed his first triple jumps in competition—two triple toe loops.

At the same time, Wylie was competing in pair skating with partner Dana Graham. They won the junior pairs title at the 1980 U.S. nationals. They were coached by John Nicks, commuting to work with him in California. They placed eighth in the senior division at the 1981 U.S. nationals, but then dissolved their partnership when they lost financial sponsorship.

In 1985, wanting to rework some of his technique, Wylie left Fassi and began to train instead with Evy and Mary Scotvold, who were at that time located in Janesville, Wisconsin. Shortly afterwards, they all moved to the Boston area.

Wylie placed second at the U.S. Figure Skating Championships in 1988, 1990, and 1992. He won the silver medal at the 1992 Winter Olympics in Albertville, France. The medal was considered a major upset, as Wylie had never finished higher than ninth at the World Figure Skating Championships four years prior, and had skated such a poor performance at the 1992 U.S. Championships that reporters questioned his placement on the Olympic team. The USFSA had even left Wylie off the team for the 1992 World Championships, naming Mark Mitchell in his place.

Figure skating writer and historian Ellyn Kestnbaum stated that Wylie's Christian faith influenced his skating, especially his free skating program during the 1991—1992 season, when he used music from the Henry V soundtrack, when he "extended his body fully into space" and "might have been reaching for and supported by an ineffable spirituality". Kestnbaum also stated that Wylie used dramatic and powerful motions in his free skate, with a footwork section that portrayed a swordfight that "epitomized a heroic masculine energy". According to Kestnbaum, Wylie also used more feminine movements, with curved elbows, soft hands, and an Ina Bauer movement. Wylie might have used these movements in order to emphasize his "beautiful extended body lines" and because he moved in harmony with his music. This style, used throughout his skating career, consistently earned him high artistic scores.

After the Olympics, Wylie joined the professional skating ranks. He won the 1992 U.S. Open Professional Championship and the 1993 World Professional Figure Skating Championships. Wylie toured with Stars on Ice from 1992 to 1998 before retiring to attend graduate school and work in the corporate world.

After leaving his job at Disney in 2004, Wylie returned to the ice for 22 dates with Stars on Ice. He has also continued his long association with An Evening with Champions, the annual benefit show at Harvard. Wylie has worked as a sports commentator/analyst, most recently for ESPN and Universal Sports.

Wylie was inducted into the U.S. Figure Skating Hall of Fame on January 25, 2008.

== Health ==
While exercising with friends on April 21, 2015, Wylie collapsed and was unresponsive. One of the friends he was training with, Billy Griggs, was certified in CPR and immediately began chest compressions until medical attention arrived on scene. Paramedics administered a defibrillator but were unsuccessful in resuscitating Wylie. After first responders injected his heart with epinephrine, Wylie's heart started again. He was immediately transferred to Charlotte, North Carolina hospital where doctors diagnosed him as having suffered a sudden cardiac arrest. Wylie was put into a medically induced coma and began a treatment known as therapeutic hypothermia, to cool his brain and body to 90 degrees and reduce any possible brain damage.

After two days, Wylie woke up from his coma and was released from the hospital nine days later. He has made a full recovery but continues to wear an implantable cardioverter-defibrillator pacemaker. He had no symptoms of heart disease except for experiencing a few dizzy spells a few days before the incident. Doctors gave Wylie a clean bill of health, saying he had no heart or brain damage.

== Awards ==
- U.S. Olympic Spirit Award (1992)
- U.S. Figure Skating Hall of Fame Inductee (2008)

== Professional competitive highlights ==
- Ice Wars 1996 (team) 1st
- Battle of the Sexes 1996 (men's team) 1st
- Miko Masters 1996 1st
- Challenge of Champions 1995 1st
- Fall Team Pro-Am (team) 1st, 1st overall
- Ice Wars 1995 (team) 1st
- Miko Masters Paris Championships 1995 1st
- Ice Wars 1994 (team) 1st
- Spring Pro-Am 1994 1st
- World Challenge of Champions 1993 1st
- World Professional Figure Skating Championships 1993 1st
- Fall Pro-Am 3rd 1993 Miko Masters Paris Championships 1993 1st
- World Challenge of Champions 1992 1st
- U.S. Open Professional Championships 1992 1st
- Fall Pro-Am 1992 1st

== Programs ==
=== Post-1992 ===
Season	Exhibition / professional competition
2003-2004	"Hero" by Enrique Iglesias; JFK Soundtrack by John Williams choreo. by Mary Scotvold; "Healing Rain" by Michael W Smith; "Oh Come All Ye Faithful" by Michael W Smith
1997-1998	On the Waterfront Soundtrack by Leonard Bernstein choreo. by Mary Scotvold; "Go the Distance" from Hercules by Michael Bolton; "How About You" by Harry Nilsson; "Summon the Heroes" by John Williams choreo. by Mary Scotvold; Sleepers Soundtrack by John Williams; "Place in this World" by Michael W Smith; Carmina Burana by Carl Orff choreo. by Mary Scotvold; "Touch Me" by The Doors choreo. by Lar Lubovitch
1996-1997	On the Waterfront Soundtrack by Leonard Bernstein choreo. by Mary Scotvold; "Bring Him Home" from Les Misérables choreo. by Mary Scotvold; "How About You" by Harry Nilsson; "Summon the Heroes" by John Williams choreo. by Mary Scotvold; Mission: Impossible Soundtrackby Danny Elfman; JFK Soundtrack by John Williams choreo. by Mary Scotvold; Carmina Burana by Carl Orff choreo. by Mary Scotvold; "Touch Me" by The Doors choreo. by Lar Lubovitch; The Mission Soundtrack by Ennio Morricone; Organ Concerto in G Minor by Poulenc; Water Fountain by David Foster; Leonore Overture No. 3 by Beethoven choreo. by Mary Scotvold; "Angels We Have Heard on High" perf by Philadelphia Orchestra; Concerto in E Major - Siciliano by JS Bach
1995-1996	On the Waterfront Soundtrack by Leonard Bernstein choreo. by Mary Scotvold; Apollo 13 Soundtrack by James Horner choreo. by Mary Scotvold; "How About You" by Harry Nilsson; "This is the Moment" from Jekyll and Hyde choreo. by Mary Scotvold; Schindler's List Soundtrack by John Williams choreo. by Mary Scotvold; JFK Soundtrack by John Williams choreo. by Mary Scotvold; Carmina Burana by Carl Orff choreo. by Mary Scotvold; La Valse by Maurice Ravel choreo. by Mary Scotvold; "It Had to Be You" by Harry Connick Jr; "Tonight" (with Nancy Kerrigan) from EFX perf by Michael Crawford; "Oh Come All Ye Faithful" by Michael W Smith
1994-1995	The Untouchables Soundtrack by Ennio Morricone; Carlito's Way Soundtrack by Patrick Doyle choreo. by Mary Scotvold; "Gallop" from The Comedians by Dmitry Kabalevsky; "Silent Night" by Neil Diamond; Prelude Fugue and Riffs by Leonard Bernstein; Schindler's List Soundtrack by John Williams choreo. by Mary Scotvold; Henry V Soundtrack by Patrick Doyle; Symphony No 3 by Saint-Saens choreo. by Mary Scotvold; Carmina Burana by Carl Orff choreo. by Mary Scotvold; "Oh Holy Night" by Tevin Campbell; The Mission Soundtrack by Ennio Morricone; Organ Concerto in G Minorby Poulenc; Symphony No 3 by Saint-Saens choreo. by Mary Scotvold
1993-1994	The Untouchables Soundtrack by Ennio Morricone; Carlito's Way Soundtrack by Patrick Doyle choreo. by Mary Scotvold; "This is the Moment" from Jekyll and Hyde choreo. by Mary Scotvold; "Angel" by Jon Secada choreo. by Mary Scotvold; "The Last Night of the World" (with Nancy Kerrigan) from Miss Saigon; JFK Soundtrack by John Williams choreo. by Mary Scotvold; Henry V Soundtrack by Patrick Doyle; Symphony No 3 by Saint-Saens choreo. by Mary Scotvold; Carmina Burana by Carl Orff choreo. by Mary Scotvold; "Oh Holy Night" by Tevin Campbell
1992-1993	"It Had to Be You" by Harry Connick Jr; "This is the Moment" from Jekyll and Hyde choreo. by Mary Scotvold; "Why God, Why" from Miss Saigon choreo. by Mary Scotvold; "The Last Night of the World" (with Nancy Kerrigan) from Miss Saigon; JFK Soundtrack by John Williams choreo. by Mary Scotvold

=== Pre-1992 ===
Season	Short program	Free skating	Exhibition
1991-1992	La Valse by Maurice Ravel choreo. by Mary Scotvold	Henry V Soundtrack by Patrick Doyle; Symphony No 3 by Saint-Saens choreo. by Mary Scotvold	"Why God, Why" from Miss Saigon choreo. by Mary Scotvold; "The Last Night of the World" (with Nancy Kerrigan) from Miss Saigon choreo. by Mary Scotvold
1990-1991	The Right Stuff Soundtrack by Bill Conti choreo. by Mary Scotvold	The Mission Soundtrack by Ennio Morricone; Organ Concerto in G Minorby Poulenc; Water Fountain by David Foster; Leonore Overture No. 3 by Beethovan choreo. by Mary Scotvold	"It Had to Be You" by Harry Connick Jr; "Try a Little Tenderness" from The Commitments Soundtrack; "Why God, Why" from Miss Saigon choreo. by Mary Scotvold; "The Last Night of the World" (with Nancy Kerrigan) from Miss Saigon
1989-1990	"Reach for the Stars" by Herb Alpert; "And the Kids Call It Boogie" by Gap Mangione choreo. by Mary Scotvold; Sing Hallelujah by Phil Driscoll; "And the Kids Call It Boogie" by Gap Mangione choreo. by Mary Scotvold	The Mission Soundtrack by Ennio Morricone; Organ Concerto in G Minorby Poulenc; Water Fountain by David Foster; Leonore Overture No. 3 by Beethovan choreo. by Mary Scotvold	"Dear Father" by Neil Diamond; "It Had to Be You" by Harry Connick Jr; "Why God, Why" from Miss Saigon choreo. by Mary Scotvold
1988-1989	Sing Hallelujah by Phil Driscoll; "And the Kids Call It Boogie" by Gap Mangione choreo. by Mary Scotvold	The Mission Soundtrack by Ennio Morricone; Organ Concerto in G Minorby Poulenc; Water Fountain by David Foster; Leonore Overture No. 3 by Beethovan choreo. by Mary Scotvold	"Dear Father" by Neil Diamond; "Gethsemane" from Jesus Christ Superstar choreo. by Mary Scotvold
1987-1988	Sing Hallelujah by Phil Driscoll; A Chorus Line choreo. by Mary Scotvold	The Natural Soundtrack by Randy Newman; 1984 Olympic Theme by John Williams; The River by John Williams; 1976 Olympic Theme by Salsoul Orchestra choreo. by Mary Scotvold	"I Can Do That" from A Chorus Line choreo. by Mary Scotvold; "Gethsemane" from Jesus Christ Superstar choreo. by Mary Scotvold
1986-1987	Tap Dance Kid Medley	The Natural Soundtrack by Randy Newman; 1984 Olympic Theme by John Williams; The River by John Williams; 1976 Olympic Theme by Salsoul Orchestra choreo. by Mary Scotvold	Loisaida by Joe Jackson
1985-1986	Tap Dance Kid Medley	The Natural Soundtrack by Randy Newman; 1984 Olympic Theme by John Williams; The River by John Williams; 1976 Olympic Theme by Salsoul Orchestra choreo. by Mary Scotvold	"Fabulous Feet" from Tap Dance Kid
1983-1984	Fanfare for the Common Man by Aaron Copland; "Reviewing the Situation" from Oliver!	Charlie Chaplin Medley	"Fever" (instrumental) written by Little Willie John; "Lady" (Saxophone cover) written by Lionel Richie
1982-1983			"Lullabye of Broadway" from 42nd Street
1981-1982	On the 20th Century Overture by Cy Coleman	Prelude to Islandia Overture by The Pointer Sisters	
1980-1981		Cipollino Ballet by Karen Khachaturian	"Beggar's Game" by Dan Fogelberg

== Results ==
International
Event	79–80	80-81	81–82	82–83	83–84	84–85	85–86	86–87	87–88	88–89	89–90	90–91	91–92
Olympics									10th				2nd
Worlds									9th		10th	11th	
Skate America								7th					
Skate Canada											2nd		3rd
Inter. de Paris										1st			5th
NHK Trophy			5th						2nd			4th	
Nations Cup											3rd		
St. Ivel									1st				
International: Junior
Junior Worlds		1st											
National
U.S. Champ.	2nd J	1st J	11th	5th	4th	5th	5th	5th	2nd	3rd	2nd	3rd	2nd
J = Junior

== See also ==
- Notable alumni of St. Mark's School of Texas
