= Adult figure skating =

Age bracket in figure skating

Adult figure skating is a term used by skating organizations to refer to tests and competitions for amateur ice skaters over 21. The category was originally aimed at skaters who had taken up the sport as adults, but more recently has expanded to include adult skaters performing and competing at an 'elite' level (Adult Masters), many of whom had skated competitively as children or adolescents. Adults who are learning to skate without prior experience are also included. In addition, a "Young Adult" category (ages 18 – 20) has been added to many Adult events.

In 2011, figure skating historian James R. Hines called adult figure skating "one of the newest and fastest growing areas of competitive figure skating".

== United States ==
US Figure Skating was the earliest sport governing body to codify tests and competition standards for adult skating.

Adult freeskate tests were introduced in the mid-1996s, and adult moves in the field (MITF) tests followed in 2002.

=== Testing ===
Standard track tests are open to skaters of any age, but because adults who take up skating have more limitations than young beginners, the U.S. Figure Skating introduced special tests for this category. The tests have roughly the same elements as the standard track Pre-Preliminary through Juvenile, but with a more relaxed judging standard and some moves rearranged.

There are both moves in the field and freeskate tests at the following levels:

Adult Test Level	Standard Test 'Equivalent'
Adult Pre-Bronze	Pre-Preliminary
Adult Bronze	Preliminary
Adult Silver	Pre-Juvenile
Adult Gold	Juvenile
Skaters who wish to continue beyond Gold may switch to the standard test track beginning with Intermediate moves in the field*.

Skaters must pass the moves in the field test before testing the corresponding freeskate test.

There is also an adult component to ice dancing and pair skating tests.

Beginning with the pre-bronze dances, adult skaters may switch to the adult track (age 21+) or masters track (age 50+).

- Effective September 2, 2010, USFS has added an adult test track to Intermediate - Senior moves in the field tests. The patterns in these tests are identical to standard tests, however, the tester is marked on a lower passing average.

Adult and masters dance tests are identical to standard tests, but do not require the tester to also perform a solo pattern of the dance, and the tester is marked on a lower passing average. Preliminary dances are tested standard track.

Adult Pairs tests are the Adult Bronze, Adult Silver and Adult Gold.

=== Competitions ===
The first adult figure skating competition in the U.S. was held in 1995.

For competitions, skaters are grouped in events by age. (The age groups may be merged depending on the number of entries). In May 2014, the age ranges in US Figure Skating were changed to the following:

Age Classification	Age Range
I	21–35 years old
II	36–45 years old
III	46–55 years old
IV	56–65 years old
V	66+ years old

Many Adult events now include a "Young Adult" category for skaters from 18 – 20 years old.

U.S. Figure Skating has four official adult competitions: Eastern, Midwestern, and Pacific Coast Sectionals, and the U.S. Adult Championships (Adult Nationals). Adult Sectionals offer qualifying events called "Championship," which are required events for skaters attempting to qualify to compete in the Championship events at Adult Nationals. The top four skaters in each Championship event qualify for the Championship event at Nationals. Other non-qualifying (open) events are also held at Sectionals. Prior to the creation of Sectionals in the late 1990s, adult skaters had their events at standard regional competitions.

The U.S. Adult Championships includes the Championship events, as well as open Adult level events (Bronze through Gold) and Masters level events (Intermediate through Senior). Along with the freeskate events, pairs, dance, solo dance, and showcase events are held. The Showcase events are split between Artistic/Dramatic and Light Entertainment for each level. All Championship and Gold or higher events are scored using the ISU Judging System. All other events, including Showcase, are scored with the 6.0 judging system.

Skaters who have passed the standard track Intermediate freeskate or 2nd figure test must compete at the Masters level (Intermediate, Novice, Junior and Senior level skaters). Masters levels include: Masters Intermediate, Masters Novice, Masters Junior, Masters Senior, Championship Intermediate/Novice, and Championship Junior/Senior.

List of US Adult Figure Skating Championships

Year	Location	Dates	Results
2024	Cleveland, OH	April 3-6, 2024	
2023	Salt Lake City, UT	April 12-15, 2023	
2022	Newark, DE	April 6–9, 2022	
2021	Rochester, MI	June 23–26, 2021	
2020	Newark, DE	April 14–18, 2020	Canceled
2019	Salt Lake City, UT	April 3–6, 2019	
2018	Marlborough, MA	April 11–14, 2018	
2017	Wake Forest, NC	April 18–22, 2017	
2016	Ann Arbor, MI	April 5–9, 2016	
2015	Salt Lake City, UT	April 14–18, 2015	
2014	Hyannis, MA	April 8–12, 2014	
2013	Scottsdale, AZ	April 9–13, 2013	
2012	Bensenville (Chicago), IL	April 10–14, 2012	
2011	Salt Lake City, UT	April 12–16, 2011	
2010	Bloomington, MN	April 13–17, 2010	
2009	Grand Rapids, MI	April 22 - 15, 2009	
2008	Lake Placid, NY	April 9–12, 2008	
2007	Bensenville (Chicago), IL	April 11–14, 2007	
2006	Dallas, TX	March 29 - April 1, 2006	
2005	Overland Park, KS	April 13–16, 2005	
2004	Lake Placid, NY	April 14–18, 2004	
2003	Ann Arbor, MI	April 9–12, 2003	
2002	Ann Arbor, MI	April 3–6, 2002	
2001	Marlborough, MA	April 25–29, 2001	
2000	Lake Placid, NY	April 13–16, 2000	Highlights
1999	Ann Arbor, MI	April 8–11, 1999	
1998	Oakland, CA	April 16–19, 1998	
1997	Lake Placid, NY	April 17–20, 1997	Highlights
1996	Lake Placid, NY	April 18–21, 1996	Highlights
1995	Wilmington, DE	April 20–23, 1995	

Several clubs host all-adult competitions throughout the skating year. These include:

Competition	Location	Club	First Held	Usually Held
Neal Wood Memorial Open	Hershey, PA	Hershey FSC		August
Peach Classic	Duluth, GA (near Atlanta)	Georgia FSC	1997	September
Halloween Classic	Aston, PA (near Philadelphia)	IceWorks SC	2004	November
New Year's Invitational	Ashburn, VA (near D.C.)	Washington FSC	2002	January or February
Deborah Burgoyne North American Invitational	Wyandotte, MI (near Detroit)	Wyandotte FSC	2003	February

Many clubs include Adult events in their standard track competitions.

There are also some other lists that are kept of the upcoming all adult competitions

== Canada ==
Adult skating in Canada did not have a national event until Skate Canada started the first Canadian adult championships in March 2004. The first Skate Canada Adult Championships were held in Burnaby, BC. In 2007 Calgary hosted the Championships with just over 120 competitors in ladies freeskate, men's freeskate, ladies interpretive, men's interpretive, compulsory dances, freedance and pairs. The CPC (Cumulative Points Calculation) scoring method used is similar to the ISU system, with adjustments for STARskaters and AdultSkaters. The CPC also has a method of recording marks for interpretive programs.

Competitors do not have to qualify to enter the championship as the competition is still new and the numbers applying are not high enough to warrant preselection.

Canadian adult skaters take the same tests as juvenile StarSkaters (there are no adult tests). The levels of competition are Adult Bronze (preliminary), Adult Silver (Junior Bronze), Adult Gold (Senior Bronze), Masters Novice (Junior Silver), Masters Junior (Senior Silver) and Masters Senior (Gold) Due to the small number of skaters at the Masters level, Masters Skaters usually get grouped together in competition. Interpretive skating starts in Pre-Introductory, Introductory, Bronze, Silver and Gold. Dance has Preliminary, Junior Bronze, Senior Bronze, Junior Silver, Senior Silver, Gold and Diamond levels in compulsory dances. Currently Freedance is an open event. Pairs is also an open event due to low enrollments.

Some Canadian adult skaters compete in the US and/or overseas; Germany, France, Russia, Switzerland and Estonia.

== International Competitions ==
There are also some other lists that are kept of the upcoming all adult competitions

=== Inter-club ===
Several clubs host annual adult-only competitions attended by skaters from several countries. These competitions use similar levels and age ranges as those used in the U.S. They include:

Competition	Location	Club	First Held	Usually Held
Le Coupe de la Montagne (The Mountain Cup) name="hines-23" />	Villard-de-Lans, France	Club de danse sur glace Villard-de-Lans	1999	May or June
Vana Tallinn Trophy	Tallinn, Estonia	SC Põhjatäht	2004	May or June
Peach Classic	Duluth, GA, USA	Georgia FSC	1997	September
Dune of Flanders Cup (Coupe des Dunes de Flandres)	Dunkerque, France	Dunkerque Patinage	1997	November/December
French Cup (Coupe de France)	France	FFSG French ice skating federation	2007	March/April
Druids Cup (Coupe des Druides)	France	rolling	?	January

The French Cup is a non-qualifying event, open to international skaters. The first competition took place in Le Havre, then Bordeaux, and Limoges. In 2007, it will take place in Besançon.

=== ISU ===
The International Skating Union held the first ISU International Adult Figure Skating Competition in Oberstdorf, Germany June 10–12, 2005. The ISU event has slightly different age ranges than used in the other adult-only competitions. The minimum age is 28 and the maximum age is 71, new class was introduced for skaters over 71.

ISU Adult Age Classification	Age Range
I	28–37 years old
II	38–47 years old
III	48–57 years old
IV	58–71 years old
V	72 years old and older

List of ISU Adult Competitions with links to results

Year	Location	Dates	Results
2024	Oberstdorf, Germany	May 12–17, 2024	
2023	Oberstdorf, Germany	May 15–20, 2023	
2022	Oberstdorf, Germany	May 23–28, 2022	
2021	Oberstdorf, Germany	Nov 8–13, 2021	(event cancelled due to coronavirus outbreak)
2020	Oberstdorf, Germany	May 17–23, 2020	(event cancelled due to coronavirus outbreak)
2019	Oberstdorf, Germany	May 19–25, 2019	
2018	Oberstdorf, Germany	May 14–19, 2018	
2017	Vancouver, Canada	August 21–26, 2017	
2017	Oberstdorf, Germany	May 22–27, 2017	
2016	Vancouver, Canada	August 28 - Sept. 2, 2016	
2016	Oberstdorf, Germany	June 13–18, 2016	
2015	Oberstdorf, Germany	May 18–23, 2015	
2014	Oberstdorf, Germany	May 27 - June 1, 2014	
2013	Oberstdorf, Germany	May 15–18, 2013	
2012	Oberstdorf, Germany	May 22–26, 2012	
2011	Oberstdorf, Germany	June 8–11, 2011	
2010	Oberstdorf, Germany	May 19–22, 2010	
2009	Oberstdorf, Germany	May 28–31, 2009	
2008	Oberstdorf, Germany	May 29 - June 1, 2008	
2007	Oberstdorf, Germany	May 24–27, 2007	
2006	Oberstdorf, Germany	June 1–3, 2006	
2005	Oberstdorf, Germany	June 10–12, 2005	
