= Halo hairstyle =

Hairstyle mimicking a halo

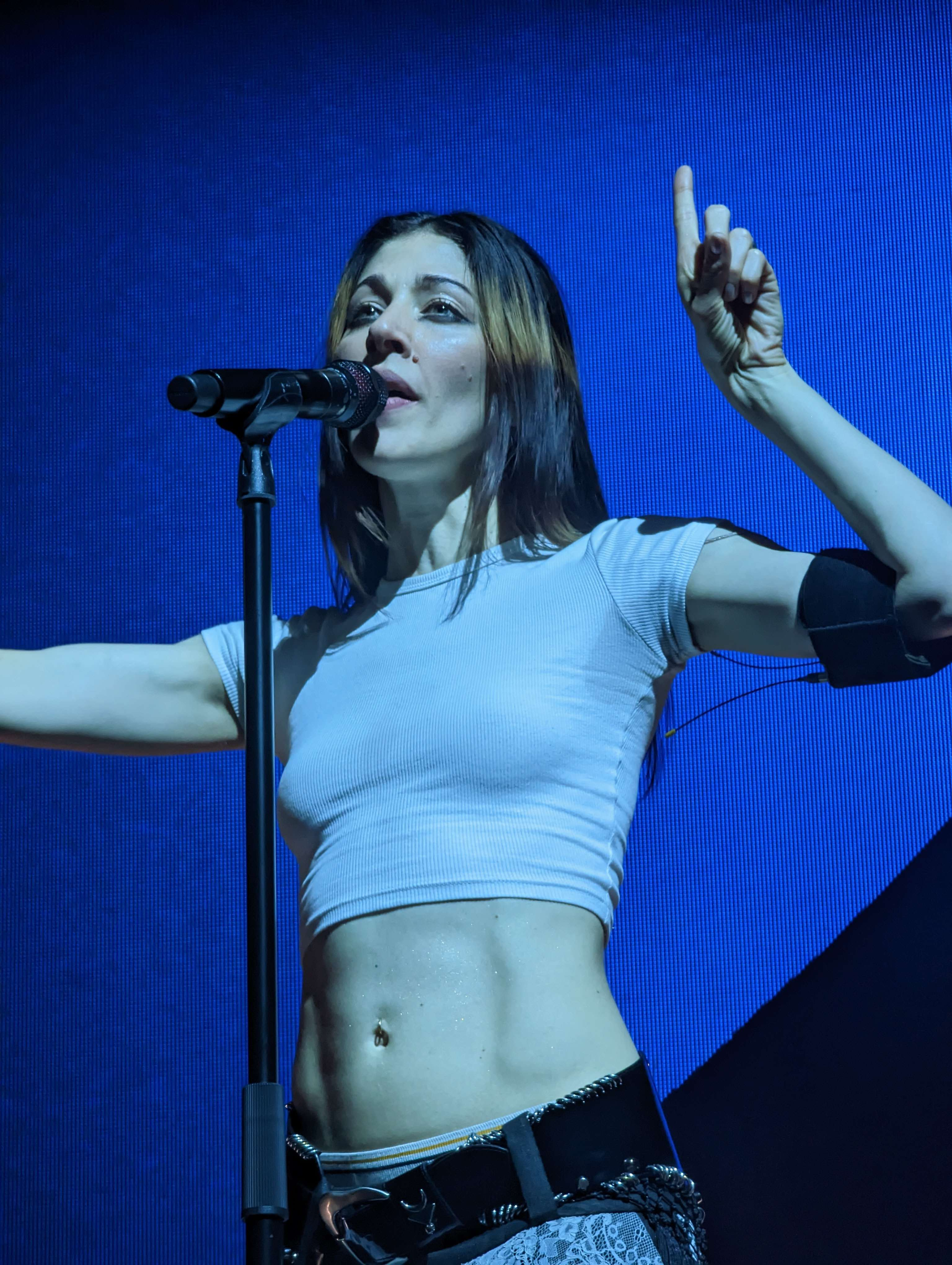
American singer Caroline Polachek with a halo hairstyle

Halo hair is a hairstyle consisting of one or more horizontal bands of a distinct color wrapping around a person's head, creating an appearance similar to a halo. The band is typically applied in a lighter shade or as highlights, usually in blond.

== Styling ==
The hairstyle consists of bands, usually in blond, applied to mimic a halo. The hairstyle often requires having hair with a darker base color in order to achieve a radiant effect. The band is positioned towards the top of the head, helping maintain the halo effect as the hair grows out. Sometimes the base may also be dyed darker to create more contrast.

== In popular culture ==
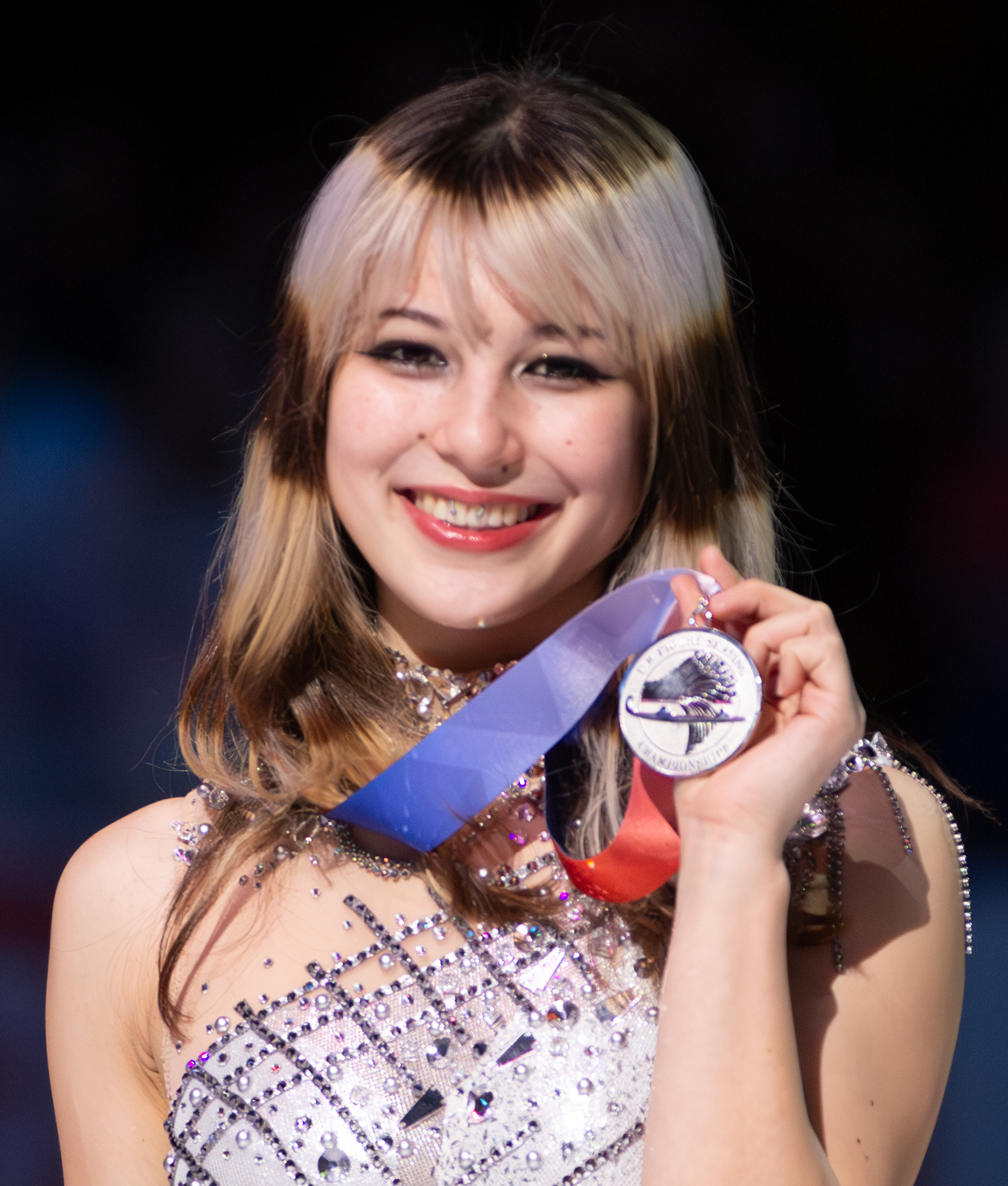
American figure skater Alysa Liu with a halo hairstyle with multiple highlighted bands

The halo hairstyle gained widespread media headlines with American figure skater Alysa Liu, who wore the style during the 2026 Winter Olympics. Liu was a gold medallist in both women's singles and in the team event. According to Liu, her hairstyle was completed in five hours by hairstylist Kelsey Miller. In 2026, Liu said she applies a band once every year, creating an appearance akin to alternating stripes. Liu described them as being similar to "tree rings".

Singer-songwriters Caroline Polachek and Rosalía have both sported the hairstyle, Polachek as early as 2013 while performing with synth-pop band Chairlift, and Rosalía while promoting the release of her 2025 album Lux, which is surrounded by Catholic iconography.

== See also ==
- List of hairstyles
