= Phillip DiGuglielmo =

American figure skating coach

- DiGuglielmo at the 2026 U.S. Championships

Figure skating career
- Country: United States
- Discipline: Men's singles

Phillip DiGuglielmo is an American figure skating coach and former competitive figure skater. He is a national singles technical specialist for U.S. Figure Skating competitions.

He currently coaches alongside Massimo Scali. Their coaching team is best known for coaching Alysa Liu after her return from retirement to win Olympic gold at the 2026 Winter Olympics, and gold at the 2025 World Figure Skating Championships.

== Competitive skating ==
DiGuglielmo competed regionally and nationally in the United States. He was a member of the Philadelphia Skating Club and Humane Society. He qualified to the U.S. Figure Skating Championships in 1989, where he placed 8th in junior men.

== Coaching career ==
DiGuglielmo currently coaches at the Oakland Ice Center in Oakland, California and is a member of the St. Moritz Ice Skating Club. He serves as a National Singles technical specialist for U.S. Figure Skating. In the past, he has been the chair of the U.S. Figure Skating Coaches Committee and of the Singles Development Committee. He is currently a member of the U.S. Figure Skating Coaches Council, and participates in coaching education, and skater camps and seminars.

DiGuglielmo alongside his student Alysa Liu and coaching partner Massimo Scali at the 2026 U.S. Figure Skating Championships

He has won several awards for coaching - both individually, and jointly as a coaching team with Massimo Scali. In 2026, the International Skating Union presented him with the award for Best Coach, recognizing his work with Alysa Liu after her comeback in the 2024–25 season. DiGuglielmo and Scali were presented with the Order of Ikkos medallion by Liu after the 2025–26 season, an award from the United States Olympic and Paralympic Committee that recognizes those who most significantly contribute to an athlete's accomplishments. DiGuglielmo and Scali were awarded the U.S. Figure Skating Coach of the Year award in 2025, and DiGuglielmo received the US Figure Skating Impact Award for Excellence in the same year.

His current students include:

- (United States) Alysa Liu
- (United States) Rachel Samiri

His former students include:

- (United States) Mark Sadusky

Additionally, he coaches a number of regional and national competitors.
