= Alysa Liu =

American figure skater (born 2005)

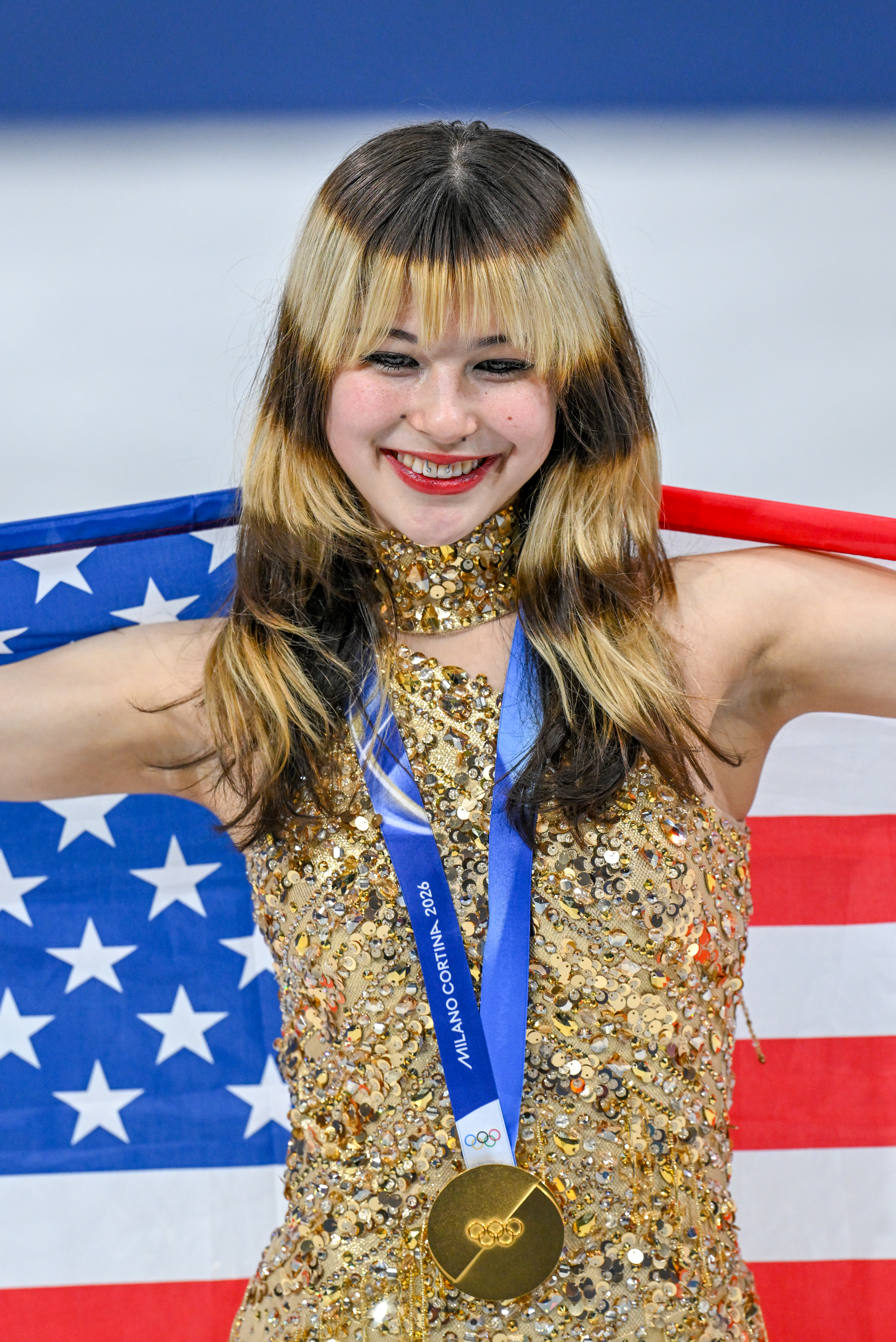
- Liu after winning the 2026 Winter Olympics – Women's singles gold medal

Personal information
- Born: August 8, 2005 (age 21) Clovis, California, US
- Home town: Oakland, California, US
- Education: University of California, Los Angeles (currently attending)
- Height: 5 ft 2 in (158 cm) (Note: Liu has also claimed her height was 5 ft 3 in.)

Figure skating career
- Country: United States
- Discipline: Women's singles
- Coach: Phillip DiGuglielmo; Massimo Scali
- Skating club: St. Moritz Ice Skating Club, Oakland
- Began skating: 2010
- Highest WS: 1st (2025–26)

Medal record
| Event | Gold medal – first place | Silver medal – second place | Bronze medal – third place |
| Olympic Games | 2 | 0 | 0 |
| World Championships | 1 | 0 | 1 |
| Grand Prix Final | 1 | 0 | 0 |
| U.S. Championships | 2 | 2 | 0 |
| World Team Trophy | 1 | 0 | 0 |
| World Junior Championships | 0 | 0 | 1 |
| Junior Grand Prix Final | 0 | 1 | 0 |
Medal list
Olympic Games
| Gold medal – first place | 2026 Milano Cortina | Singles |
| Gold medal – first place | 2026 Milano Cortina | Team |
World Championships
| Gold medal – first place | 2025 Boston | Singles |
| Bronze medal – third place | 2022 Montpellier | Singles |
Grand Prix Final
| Gold medal – first place | 2025–26 Nagoya | Singles |
U.S. Championships
| Gold medal – first place | 2019 Detroit | Singles |
| Gold medal – first place | 2020 Greensboro | Singles |
| Silver medal – second place | 2025 Wichita | Singles |
| Silver medal – second place | 2026 St. Louis | Singles |
World Team Trophy
| Gold medal – first place | 2025 Tokyo | Team |
World Junior Championships
| Bronze medal – third place | 2020 Tallinn | Singles |
Junior Grand Prix Final
| Silver medal – second place | 2019–20 Turin | Singles |

Chinese name
- Traditional Chinese: 劉美賢
- Simplified Chinese: 刘美贤
Transcriptions
Standard Mandarin
- Hanyu Pinyin: Liú Měixián
Yue: Cantonese
- Jyutping: Lau4 Mei5 Jin4

Alysa Liu (/əˈlɪsə ˈliːuː/ ə-LISS-ə LEE-oo; (Note: Liu often uses this pronunciation when saying her name, although she has stated that the pronunciation /əˈliːsə ˈljoʊ/ ə-LEE-sə LYOH is "technically correct" and used by her family.) born August 8, 2005) is an American figure skater. She is the 2026 Olympic champion in both the women's singles and team events, the 2025 World champion, the 2022 World bronze medalist, the 2025–26 Grand Prix Final champion, a two-time Grand Prix medalist, a four-time Challenger Series champion, and a two-time U.S. national champion.

At the junior level, Liu was the 2020 World Junior bronze medalist, the 2019–20 Junior Grand Prix Final silver medalist, a two-time Junior Grand Prix champion, and the 2018 U.S. junior national champion. In 2019, Liu, then 13, became the youngest-ever U.S. women's national champion. The following year, she became the youngest skater to win two senior national titles, the first woman to win consecutive U.S. titles since Ashley Wagner in 2012 and 2013, and the first girl to win the junior and senior titles back-to-back since Mirai Nagasu in 2008.

Following a period of retirement, she won a world title at the 2025 World Championships, becoming the first U.S. woman to do so since Kimmie Meissner in 2006. At the 2026 Winter Olympics, she became the first American woman to win an individual medal since Sasha Cohen in 2006, as well as the first American gold medalist since Sarah Hughes in 2002.

An accomplished jumper, Liu was the first woman to complete a quadruple jump and a triple Axel in the same program, and the first to land a triple Axel-triple toe loop combination in the short program. She was the first American woman to land a quadruple jump and the first American junior woman to complete a triple Axel in international competition.

== Early life and education ==
Liu was born on August 8, 2005, in Clovis, California, a suburb of Fresno in the Central Valley. She was raised in the San Francisco Bay Area, predominantly in Oakland. Liu began skating at the age of five and, by the age of seven, she was already competing at the national level. Her father, Arthur Liu, is a Chinese dissident who went into exile in the U.S. through Operation Yellowbird in 1989 due to the crackdown on participants in the Tiananmen Square Protests; he was a graduate student in Guangzhou, China. At age 25, Arthur arrived in Oakland and initially worked as a busboy at a Chinese restaurant in Berkeley. After earning an M.B.A. from California State University, East Bay, and a J.D. from the University of California College of the Law, San Francisco, he became an attorney.

Liu is the oldest of five children, with siblings Selina and triplets Julia, Justin, and Jaylin, all of whom were born via surrogacy through two anonymous egg donors, with Alysa sharing the same birth mother as the triplets. Her father also stated that she met her birth mother later in life as a teenager. Arthur's mother came from China to help him raise his children when they were little. Arthur's then wife who became their mother, Yan Qingxin "Mary", continued to serve as their legal guardian after she and Arthur divorced.

Alysa attended Chinese school for three years before transferring to the Oakland School for the Arts which, at the time, offered a figure skating program. When Liu started missing too many classes for travel related to competitions, she enrolled in California Connections Academy and began homeschooling at her father's law office in between practices. She graduated from high school in June 2021 at age 15. In fall 2023, Liu enrolled at the University of California, Los Angeles (UCLA), where she currently studies psychology.

== Career ==
=== Early juvenile career ===
Liu began skating at age five when her father, a fan of Michelle Kwan, brought her to the Oakland Ice Center in Oakland, California. She began taking group lessons with her first and childhood coach, Laura Lipetsky, a former figure skater who had trained under Frank Carroll, and quickly moved to individual sessions. Lipetsky began teaching Liu at the age of 5½ years old. As a juvenile in 2015, Liu came in seventh place at the Central Pacific Regionals. At the 2016 U.S. Championships, at 10 years old, she became the youngest female skater to earn the intermediate gold medal, winning by less than a point. She was first after the short program; her free skate included two triple Salchows, the first completed in combination with a double toe loop and earning her a "program-high 7.00 points".

Competing in the novice category, Liu placed fourth at the 2017 U.S. Championships. She was in first place after her short program with a 1.22-point lead. Her short program included a split jump into a triple Lutz-triple toe loop combination, which was ruled under-rotated, and a triple flip. Liu fell to fourth place after the long program in which she landed two triple-triple combinations but did not earn sufficient program component scores to retain her narrow lead.

=== Junior career ===
==== 2017–18 season: Junior debut and National junior champion ====
Liu opened her season with a silver medal at the 2017 Asian Open Trophy in which she finished second to Japan's Mana Kawabe. She was the youngest skater to compete in the junior division at the 2018 U.S. Championships in San Jose, California. She won the competition despite suffering from a cold and sore throat. She scored a season's best in the short program with an almost seven-point lead going into the free skate. Her short program included three level-4 spins, a triple flip-triple toe loop combination, and a triple Lutz, earning her 63.83 points. She earned 120.33 points during her long program after landing two double Axels and seven triple jumps, which were all back loaded in the second half of the program. Liu was given extra points on all her jumps except for the triple flip-single loop-triple Salchow combination. She earned an overall score of 184.16 points and the second highest-ever score on the junior level. Liu was ineligible to compete at the 2018 World Junior Championships because she was not old enough. She was sent to the 2018 International Challenge Cup instead, where she won the advanced novice silver medal behind Hana Yoshida of Japan.

==== 2018–19 season ====
In August 2018, Liu competed as a novice at the 2018 Asian Open Trophy in Bangkok, Thailand. She won the gold, outscoring the silver medalist, Japan's Sara Honda, by over ten points. She landed a ratified triple Axel in the free skate, becoming the youngest skater in history to perform a clean triple Axel in competition and the fourth American female skater to do so following Tonya Harding, Kimmie Meissner, and Mirai Nagasu.

==== 2019–20 season: World Junior bronze and Junior Grand Prix Final silver ====
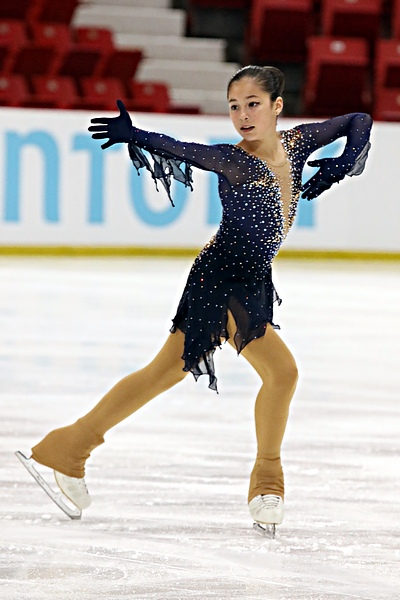
Liu at the 2019 Junior Grand Prix United States

Liu's first competition for the 2019–2020 season was at the inaugural Aurora Games, an international all-female competition held in August 2019. She earned perfect scores, led the U.S. team to first place overall, and was the first American female skater to successfully complete a quadruple Lutz in competition, although not at an ISU-recognized event. Liu made her international competition debut at the ISU Junior Grand Prix in Lake Placid in August 2019. Skating to "Don't Rain on My Parade" by Barbra Streisand in her short program, she scored 69.30 points, breaking her own personal best short program record by almost 20 points. She completed all her jumps, including three triples, completed three level-4 spins, and earned positive grades of execution for all seven elements.

During her long program, Liu became the first American female skater to complete a quadruple Lutz in a competition. She also became the first female skater to complete a quadruple jump and a triple Axel in the same program in a competition. Skating to pianist Jennifer Thomas' version of "New World Symphony," which was choreographed by Lori Nichol, Liu started her long program with a triple Axel-double toe loop combination, followed by her quadruple Lutz, for which she earned 13.80 points. She fell on her second triple Axel but successfully executed her following six triple jumps. She also earned level-4 scores for her three spins and top marks for her step sequence, earning a 59.66 program component score. She won the event by 21.52 points over the silver medalist, South Korean Park Yeon-jeong. It was the first in 20 Junior Grand Prix events that a non-Russian skater won and the first time an American won a Junior Grand Prix event since Polina Edmunds in 2013.

Liu's second slot in the Junior Grand Prix was in Poland. She came in fourth after the short program but came from behind to win the event. In her short program, she completed, at the start of her program, a triple Axel-triple toe loop, the first in Junior Grand Prix history. She doubled a planned triple loop, trailing by a little over four points going into the free skate. In her free skate, Liu "just about held onto" her first jump, a triple Axel, but improved as she went along, completing a combination that included a double toe loop. She then completed a quadruple Lutz, a "much better" triple Axel, a triple loop, and "two excellent combinations—triple Lutz-triple toe loop and triple Lutz-Euler-triple Salchow". She ended her program with a triple flip and three level-4 spins. She earned a season's best score of 138.99 in the free skate and 203.10 overall. She qualified for the Junior Grand Prix Final in second place, the first American female skater to do so since Karen Chen and Polina Edmunds in 2013, with 30 points.

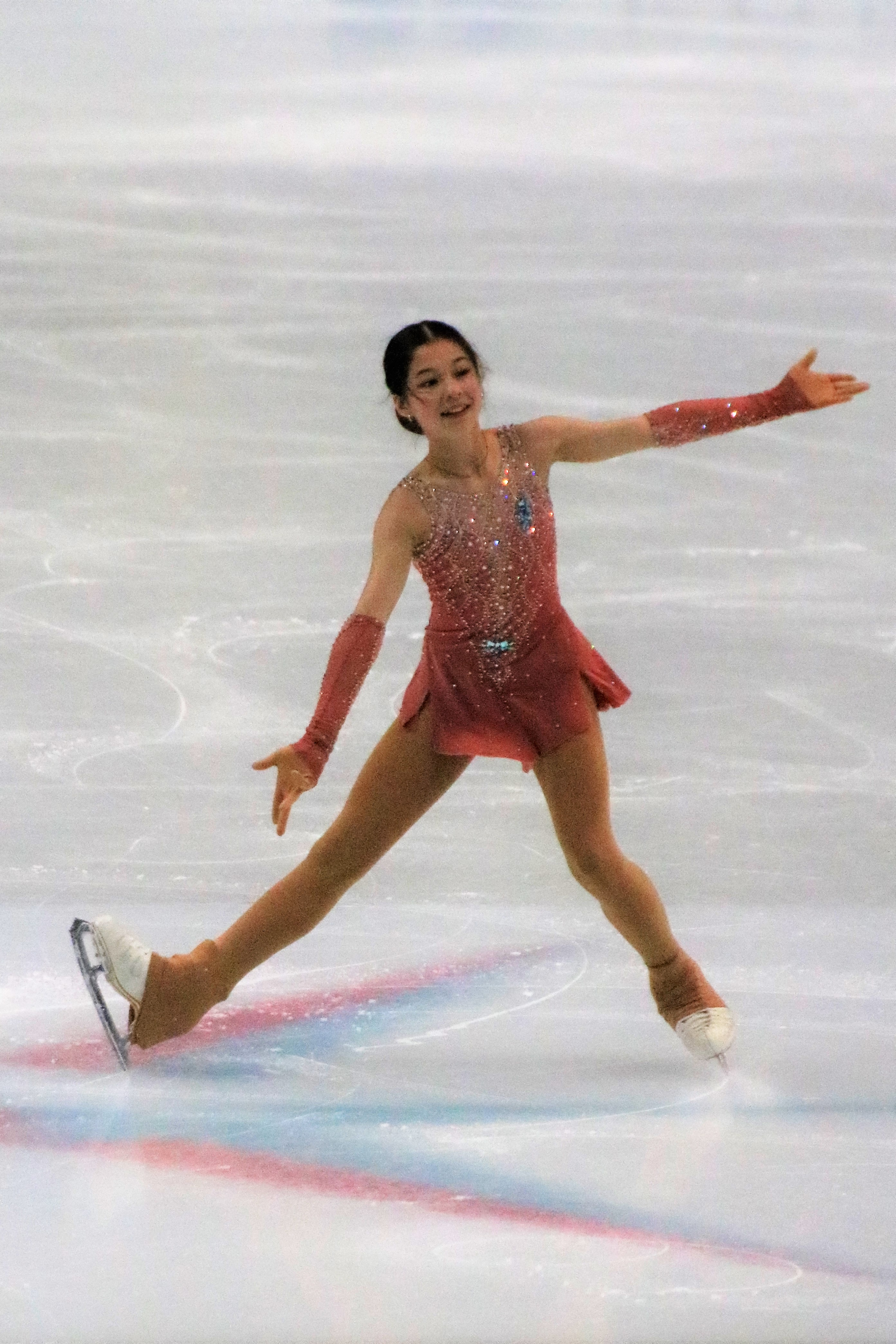
Liu at the 2019–20 Junior Grand Prix Final

Liu won the silver medal at the 2019–20 Junior Grand Prix Final behind Russia's Kamila Valieva and ahead of Daria Usacheva, also of Russia. A little over two points separated the first and fourth-place skaters in the short program. Liu placed first in the short program with a triple Axel-triple toe combination and 71.09 points, a little over a one-point lead. Although her jumps were the most difficult in her long program and she successfully completed six triple jumps, both her quadruple Lutzes and a triple Axel were judged under rotated, and she fell on her opening triple Axel, placing her second in the free skate and second overall. She told reporters afterward, "I think I should have only done one quad, but I really wanted to go for it just for the fun of it".

Liu was age-ineligible to compete in international senior-level competitions but was named to the 2020 World Junior Championships team alongside Starr Andrews and Lindsay Thorngren. She came into her first World Junior Championships ranked third in the world among juniors; ultimately, she placed third, behind Valieva and Usacheva. She came in fourth after her short program; according to ESPN, she did not "skate nearly as well at the past two national championships", and lost points for an under-rotation and negative grade of execution, but she successfully completed a triple Axel-triple toe loop combination jump, earning 67.52 points. In her solid long program, Liu earned the second-highest technical score, with 137.31 points, came in third place in the long program, and earned a cumulative score of 204.83 points. She under-rotated her opening triple Axel and fell on her quadruple Lutz, but successfully landed a triple Axel and six more triple jumps and earned level-four spins and footwork.

After the season, Liu's father switched from coach Laura Lipetsky to Phillip DiGuglielmo and Massimo Scali, the latter of whom she had started working with in 2019. Liu announced this change on June 22, 2020. She also said she would remain in Oakland and work with Canadian coaches Lori Nichol and Lee Barkell through video conferences and occasional travels to their base in Toronto, Canada.

==== 2020–21 season: Growth spurt and transitional year ====
Liu had limited international competition opportunities after the 2020–21 ISU Junior Grand Prix was canceled due to the COVID-19 pandemic, and she was age-ineligible for senior Grand Prix competitions. She struggled with her jumps during a growth spurt (from 4'7" to 5'0" by 2020; later adding 3" more to her current adult height of 5'3") and placed fourth in the domestic ISP Points Challenge behind Mariah Bell, Bradie Tennell, and Amber Glenn. In October, Liu was invited to the 2020 Las Vegas Invitational, a domestic competition sponsored by U.S. Figure Skating, as part of Team Johnny. Unable to compete at full strength after a fall on her triple Axel in practice led to a right hip injury, she finished sixth individually, and the team finished second behind Team Tara. She recovered after forgoing triple jumps for about a month. In December 2020, Liu announced the addition of former four-time U.S. men's champion Jeremy Abbott to her coaching team.

In January, Liu competed at the 2021 U.S. Championships in Las Vegas. Her difficulties at earlier competitions raised doubts about how she would perform at the event, particularly as she would not attempt a triple Axel or a quad in the competition. To the surprise of many, she placed second in the short program with a clean skate. In the free skate, she doubled one jump and under rotated two others, placing fourth in that segment and dropping to fourth overall, winning the pewter medal. Liu said afterward that she had already resumed training one of her more difficult ultra-C elements, the triple Axel, as of December 2020 and would try to resume training the other difficult elements in preparation for the next season.

=== Senior career ===
==== 2018–19 season: Senior debut and first national title ====
Although Liu was too young to compete internationally at the senior or junior level, she qualified to compete in the senior ranks at the 2019 U.S. Championships in Detroit, Michigan. On January 25, 2019, she broke Tara Lipinski's previous record and became the youngest skater to win the U.S. senior women's title after placing second in the short to defending U.S. champion Bradie Tennell with a record score (which was broken minutes later by Tennell) and first in the free skate. She became the youngest female skater to land a triple Axel at the U.S. Nationals, as well as the third female skater to do so (after Harding and Meissner), and the first female skater to do so during a short program at Nationals. She was also the first female skater to complete three triple Axels in U.S. competition. Liu scored 73.89 points in her short program, 2.71 points behind Tennell, the leader after the short program. In the long program, Tennell and Mariah Bell, who took third place in the short program, both made errors, "opening the door for Liu". Her program component score "fell well short of Tennell's and Bell's", but her technical scores made up the difference, and she posted an overall score of 217.51. She completed two consecutive triple Axels, including the first one in combination, during her long program and, out of the other six triples she completed (one of which was also in combination), only the flip was downgraded.

Since Liu was too young to compete at both the junior and senior level World Championships, her season ended in January, after U.S. Nationals, which gave her time to work on her skating skills and choreography with Italian skater Carolina Kostner in Rome, an arrangement made by her coach, Laura Lipetsky. She also began working with Italian choreographer and Olympic ice dancing competitor Massimo Scali, who is now based in Oakland, on her skating skills and choreography at the end of 2019.

==== 2019–20 season: Second national title ====
Liu entered the 2020 U.S. Championships as the favorite to defend her title. She placed second in the short program after turning out of her triple Axel attempt but successfully landed a triple flip and a triple Lutz-triple toe combination, as well as executing level-4 spins and footwork. She earned 75.40 points, a little over 3.50 points behind Bradie Tennell; she also had a technical base value advantage of more than 16 points over both Tennell and Bell. Skating last and immediately after Mariah Bell's "elegant, near flawless performance" to k.d. lang's version of the Leonard Cohen song "Hallelujah", Liu won the free skate by over eight points, with a score of 160.12, which was her career-best, and 235.52 points overall. Her final score was over 10 points higher than Bell's, who came in second place, and just under 15 points over Tennell's, who came in third. Although she failed to be the first woman at U.S. Nationals to successfully complete a quadruple Lutz, which was called under-rotated and received negative grade of execution scores, her "triple Axels were solid, and her final two spins were of surpassing quality". She landed two triple Axels in the first 65 seconds of her program and then completed six more triple jumps. Liu told reporters afterward, "This year I'm thinking, it's a new decade, like, wow, what a good start!" At the age of 14, Liu's win made her the youngest two-time women's U.S. champion and the first woman in seven years to win back-to-back U.S. championships, since Ashley Wagner in 2012 and 2013 and since Michelle Kwan won 8 consecutive titles. Bell and Tennell assisted Liu to the top tier of the podium during the awards ceremony, recreating what they had done the previous year.

==== 2021–22 season: Beijing Olympics, World bronze, and retirement ====
Liu competed in the fourth annual Peggy Fleming Trophy, a senior-level event where skating elements are evaluated artistically, placing second with a score of 118.61, behind Karen Chen. Liu spent June training with Italian coach and ISU technical specialist Lorenzo Magri in Egna, Italy to improve her jump technique. She cited the camp presence of elite Italian skaters Matteo Rizzo, Daniel Grassl and Gabriele Frangipani, in contrast with her Oakland training facility that lacked skaters who performed more difficult elements. Magri subsequently was added as a permanent member of her coaching team.

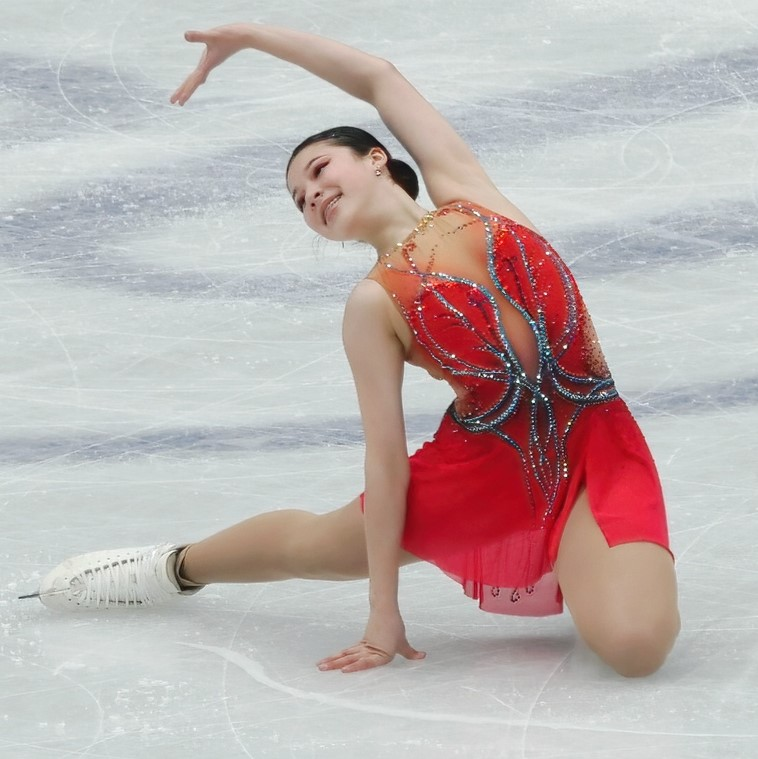
Liu finishing her short program at the 2022 World Championships

Liu made her senior international debut at the Cranberry Cup, a Senior B competition at the Skating Club of Boston in Norwood, Massachusetts, in August 2021. Liu won the competition after coming in first in both the short and the free programs. Liu attempted a triple Axel in the free but fell. Liu won the competition with a total score of 205.74. Making her debut on the ISU Challenger series, Liu won the 2021 CS Lombardia Trophy by over 32 points, successfully landing a triple Axel and receiving new personal bests. On August 30, 2021, U.S. Figure Skating announced that Liu had been selected to compete at the 2021 CS Nebelhorn Trophy, with the goal of qualifying a secured third berth for American women at the 2022 Winter Olympics. Team USA teammate Karen Chen unofficially earned the third spot at the 2021 World Figure Skating Championships in Stockholm, and Liu was sent to secure that earned spot. Liu placed first in both segments of the competition to take the gold medal and the first of six available Olympic places. Liu was the overall women's winner on the 2021–22 ISU Challenger Series.

Liu made her senior Grand Prix debut at the 2021 Skate Canada International, where she placed fourth in the short program segment. In the free skate, she fell on an under rotated opening triple Axel attempt and under rotated three other jumps; as a result, she placed seventh in that segment and dropped to fifth place overall. At her second assignment, the 2021 NHK Trophy, she finished in fourth place. Two days after her fourth-place finish at the 2021 NHK Trophy, Liu's father decided to fire coaches Phillip DiGuglielmo and Massimo Scali, so that Liu could move to Colorado Springs, Colorado, and begin working with Christy Krall, Drew Meekins, and Viktor Pfeifer. At the 2022 U.S. Championships in Nashville, Liu placed third in the short program, scoring 71.42 points despite falling on her triple Axel attempt. She was forced to withdraw from the event after testing positive for COVID-19. Despite this, she successfully petitioned to be included on the 2022 U.S. Winter Olympic team, alongside Mariah Bell and Karen Chen. Liu was the youngest athlete named to the American Olympic team.

Liu was considered the frontrunner female recruitment prospect for China as a part of its "naturalization project" to recruit overseas athletes in the Beijing 2022 Winter Olympics. Her father, however, would not be persuaded. Her father denied the recruitment, citing the Chinese government abusing the basic human rights of the Chinese people. In March 2022, Liu's father said he and Liu had been targeted in November 2021 by spies allegedly under direction of the Chinese government, in an operation to collect private information on Chinese political dissidents living in the United States. He said that one spy posed as a U.S. Olympic Committee official and requested copies of their passports, and added that he received assurances that the U.S. State Department would take additional precautions to protect Liu at the Games.

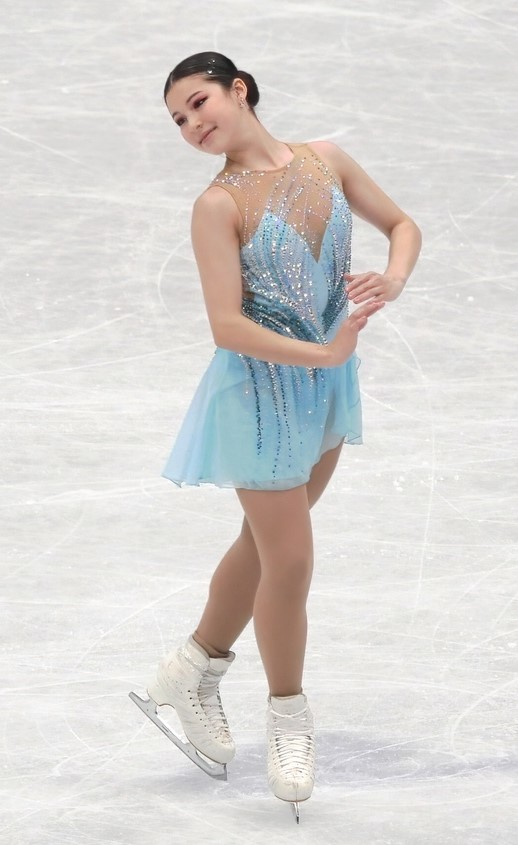
Liu during her free skate at the 2022 World Championships

In the women's event at the 2022 Winter Olympics, Liu placed eighth in the short program after receiving an edge call on her flip and slightly under rotating the second part of her jump combination. She did not attempt a triple Axel in the segment. Notwithstanding those errors, she said she was happy as "all my training paid off because I'm here competing. And the goal of my whole life and my skating career was to compete at the Olympics." She moved up to seventh place in the free skate despite under rotating her triple Axel attempt. She said she was "still in shock at how well I did. I worked a lot on this, and I'm glad I did two clean programs. I'm making a lot of memories here, and they're all really good ones." Liu was subsequently invited to skate at the exhibition gala but had not prepared an exhibition program as she had not anticipated this. A program to "Loco" by K-pop girl group Itzy was choreographed for her on-site by American ice dancer Jean-Luc Baker, with a dress borrowed from Spanish ice dancer Olivia Smart.

At the 2022 World Championships Liu was considered a podium contender in the much more open contest. She placed fifth in the short program with a clean skate. In the free skate, Liu attempted a triple Axel, landing it with an under rotation. She also under rotated the second part of a jump combination but landed six clean triple jumps and rose to third place, winning the bronze medal. She became the first American woman to medal at the World Championships since Ashley Wagner in 2016, and only the second since 2006.

On April 9, 2022, Liu announced on Instagram that she was retiring from figure skating, stating that she felt satisfied with her career, had completed her goals, and was "moving on with [her] life". Later going into more detail about her decision, she explained, "I was so into skating that I really didn't do much else. Skating takes up your whole life, almost. I don't know if other people kind of feel the same when they look back at certain parts of their life, but for me, it's definitely a blur, because it kind of meshes together, you know – going to the rink, going home, competing. There were many, many times when I didn't enjoy it." Former coach, Phillip DiGuglielmo, added, "She felt she had kept up her side of the bargain with her father and the skating community in general, which was always to go to the Olympics and be the skater everyone wanted her to be. After she achieved those goals, it was time for her to leave the sport on her own terms, on a high."

At the time, her early retirement would have marked her as the first American women's singles skater to not bid for a second Olympics since 2002 gold medalist Sarah Hughes.

==== 2024–25 season: Comeback and World champion ====
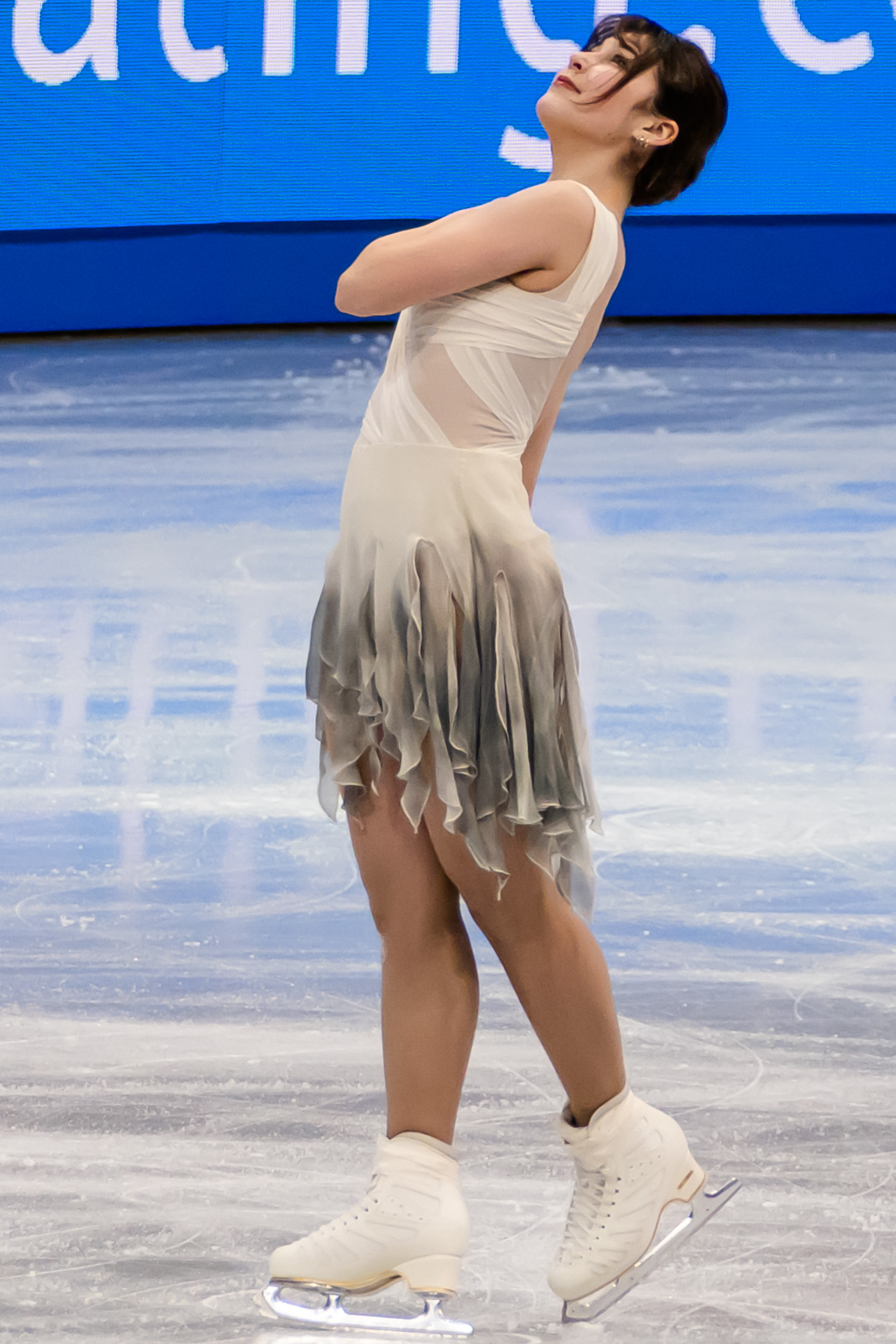
Liu finishing her short program at the 2025 World Championships

On March 1, 2024, Liu posted a video on her Instagram with on screen text "this 2024–25 season" and "back on the ice." U.S. Figure Skating confirmed Liu's comeback in a press release. Liu later explained her return to figure skating on her terms was due in part to experiencing skiing for the first time, comparing the adrenaline she enjoys receiving between the two sports. Liu decided to return to her former coaches, Phillip DiGuglielmo and Massimo Scali. Because she was a student at UCLA, Liu moved her training base to Lakewood Ice in Lakewood, California. Since DiGuglielmo and Scali are based in the Bay Area, Liu primarily worked with them remotely. Liu also began working with coaches Amy Evidente and Ivan Dinev, who work at Lakewood Ice.

In October 2024, Liu competed at the 2024 CS Budapest Trophy, her first competition since March 2022. In the short program, she under-rotated the second half of her triple-triple combination but otherwise skated cleanly, scoring 68.83 points and ranking in first place. In the free skate, she under-rotated three jumps but still ranked second in the segment and first overall, winning the gold medal. Going on to compete on the 2024–25 Grand Prix series, Liu placed second in the short program at 2024 Skate Canada International but seventh in the free skate because three of her jumps were scored as underrotated. She placed sixth overall. She followed this with a fourth-place finish at the 2024 NHK Trophy.

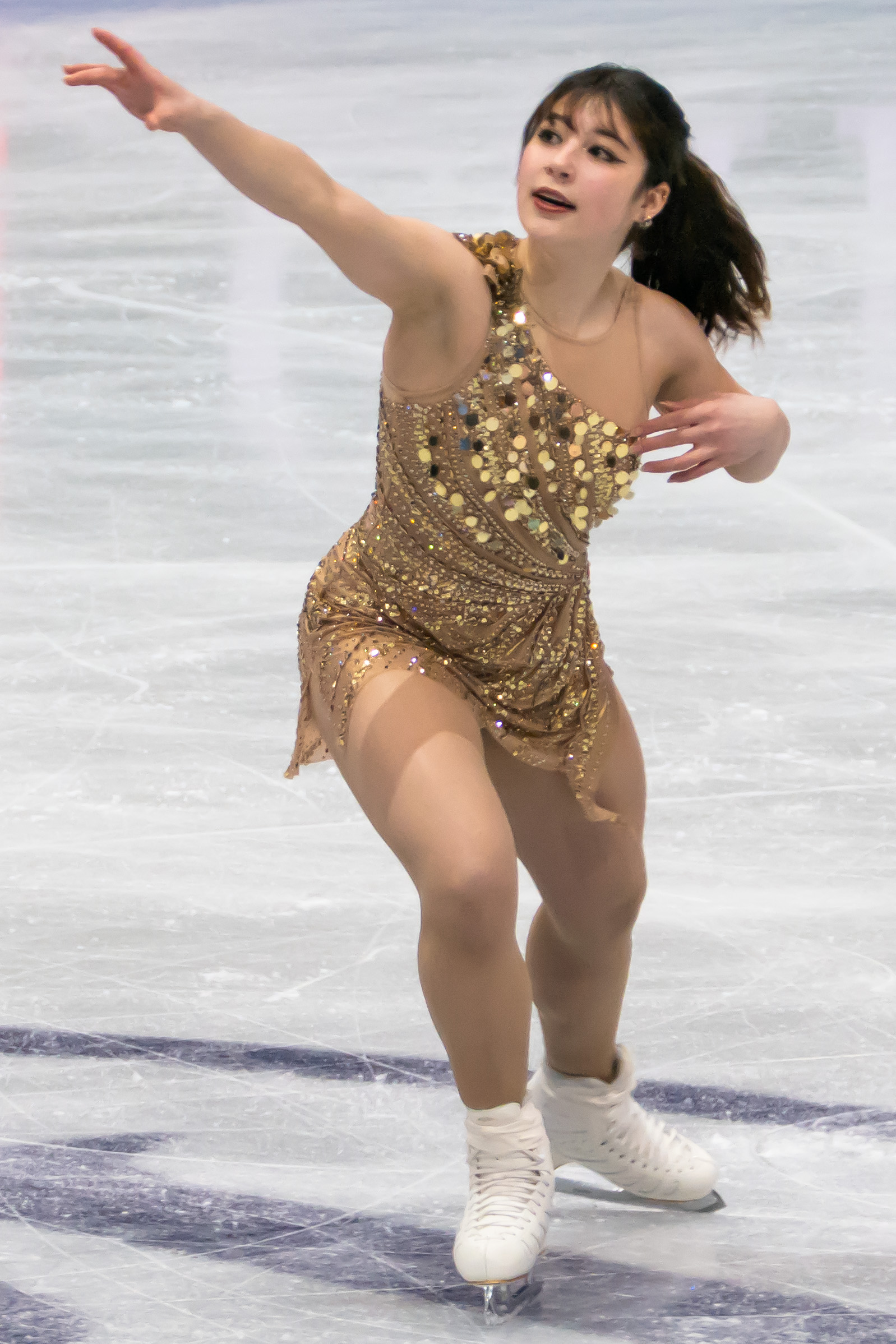
Liu during her winning free skate at the 2025 World Championships

In early December, Liu won gold at the 2024 CS Golden Spin of Zagreb. The following month, Liu competed at the 2025 U.S. Championships, where she placed first in the short program, matching her personal-best of 76.36 at the 2021 U.S. Championships, and placed second in the free skate and overall behind reigning U.S. champion Amber Glenn. At the 2025 Four Continents Championships in Seoul, South Korea, Liu placed fourth in the short and free program segments, and finished fourth overall, 1.48 points behind bronze medalist Sarah Everhardt.

On March 2, 2025, Liu took part in Legacy on Ice, an ice show organized by U.S. Figure Skating that paid tribute to lives lost aboard American Eagle Flight 5342. Later that month, at the 2025 World Figure Skating Championships in Boston, Liu won the gold medal, winning both the short and free programs. Liu dethroned three-time defending champion Kaori Sakamoto of Japan, and became the first American woman to win the World title since Kimmie Meissner in 2006. Liu's victory marked a meteoric comeback after stepping away from the sport in 2022. Liu was selected for Team USA at the 2025 World Team Trophy, where she won the short and free program segments of the women's competition, and Team USA took the gold medal.

==== 2025–26 season: Milano Cortina Olympic gold medals and Grand Prix Final gold ====
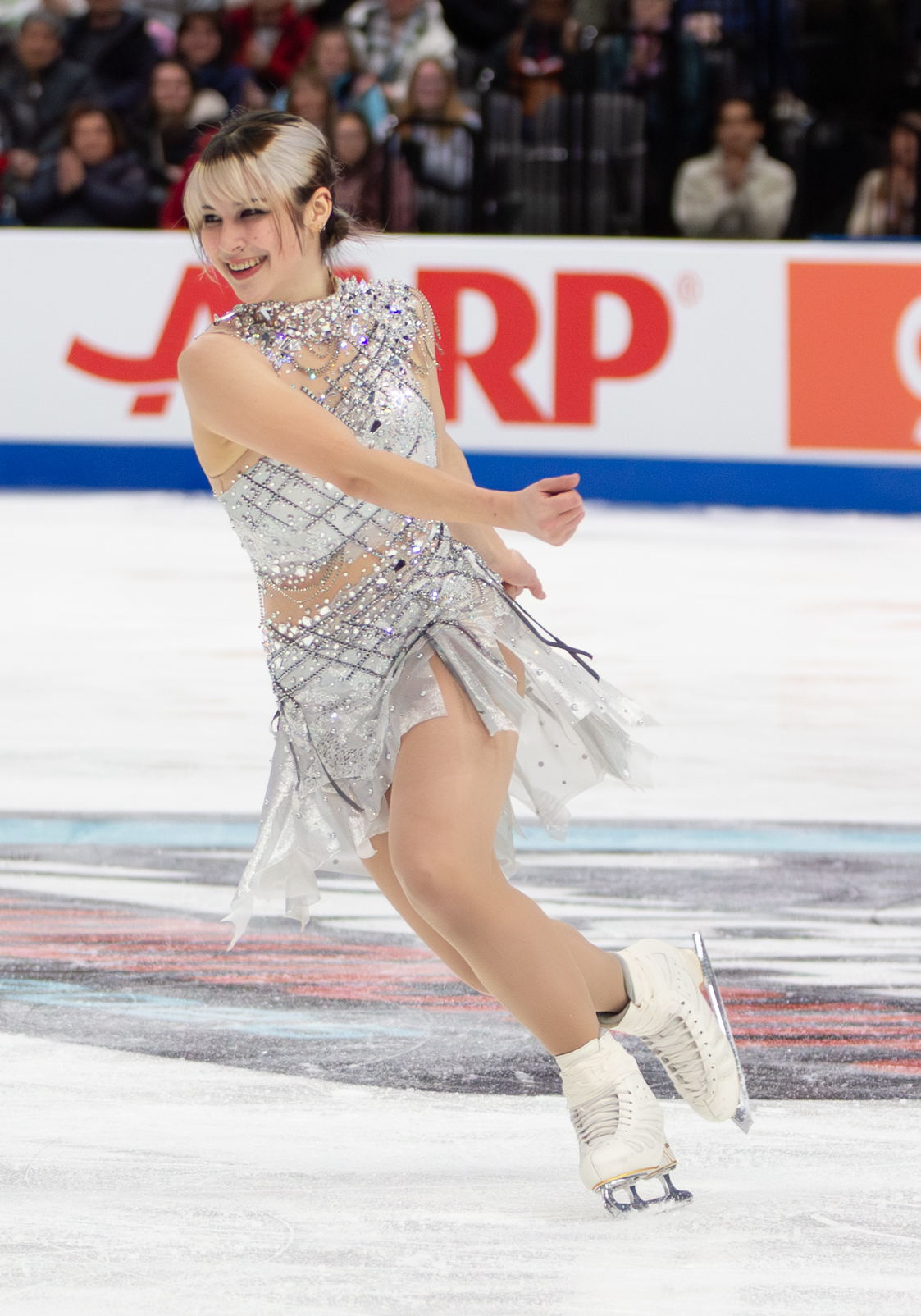
Liu performing her free skate at the 2026 U.S. Championships

Liu began the season in early September by competing at the 2025 CS Lombardia Trophy. At the event, she won the short program but placed fifth in the free skate, dropping to fourth place overall. Her short program for the season was choreographed to "This Is How It Feels" by Laufey and D4vd, but she opted to replace it after the Lombardia Trophy, when reports emerged that D4vd was implicated in a homicide investigation. Liu explained that she would be "pursuing a different direction that aligns with [her] values & just [her] overall ethos." She chose to bring back her short program from the previous season, then, just days before the Cup of China, announced that she would temporarily re-use her "MacArthur Park" free program from the previous season while she and Scali reworked her intended Lady Gaga–themed free program. At the Cup of China, Liu won her first senior Grand Prix medal, taking the silver behind teammate Amber Glenn.

The following month, she competed at 2025 Skate America, where she edged out Japan's Rinka Watanabe for the gold. She was second in the short, but finished first in the free skate and overall. Liu competed at the 2025–26 Grand Prix Final, her debut at this event, taking the gold. In early January, Liu and her choreographer finished revamping her season's originally intended "Lady Gaga" free program and revealed that she would debut the new program at the 2026 U.S. Championships. At the U.S. Championships, Liu won the silver medal behind Amber Glenn. She was subsequently named to the U.S. team for the 2026 Winter Olympics and said she would use her "MacArthur Park" free program there.

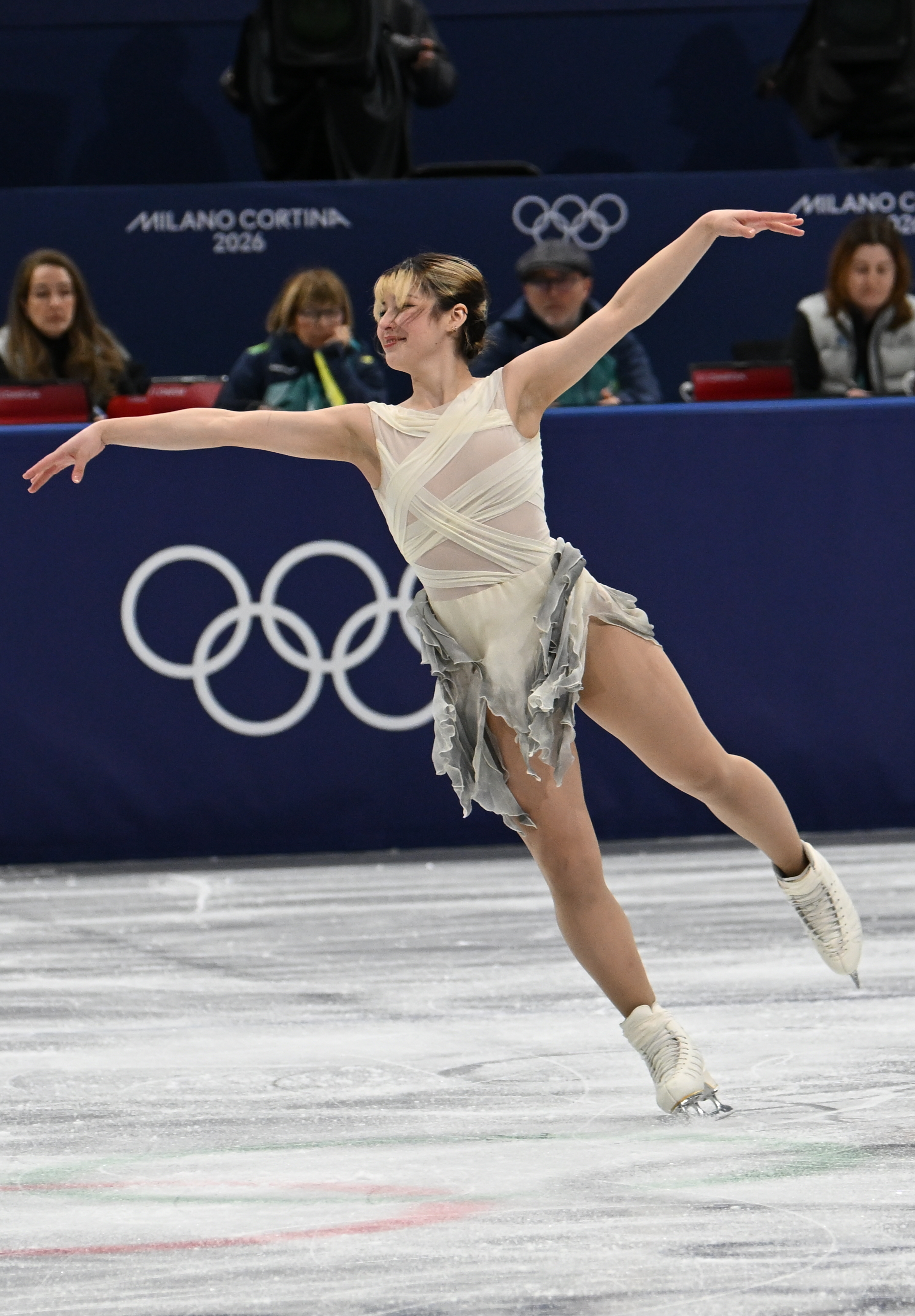
Liu performing her short program at the 2026 Winter Olympics

On February 6, Liu participated in the team event, placing second behind Kaori Sakamoto in the short program. Liu's result combined with those of her teammates secured an Olympic gold medal for Team USA.

On February 17, Liu competed in the short program segment of the women's singles event with the song "Promise" by Laufey, earning a personal-best score and placing third behind Ami Nakai and Kaori Sakamoto. Two days later, Liu competed with "MacArthur Park Suite" by Donna Summer in the free skate segment, delivering a clean program aside from receiving an unclear takeoff edge on both of her triple flip attempts. Her performance won the free skate, produced her personal-best combined total score, and vaulted her to the gold medal. She became the first American woman to medal in figure skating at the Olympics since Sasha Cohen in 2006 and the first to win gold since Sarah Hughes in 2002. Her victory also marked the first time that a women’s singles skater won two golds in one Olympic Games. Liu debuted a new routine for her gala skate two nights later, performing to the PinkPantheress/Zara Larsson remix of "Stateside", receiving praise from Cohen and Hughes, among many others.

In early March, Liu withdrew from the 2026 World Figure Skating Championships citing an overly committed schedule and inadequate preparation time following her Olympic gold medals. Second alternate Sarah Everhardt was named to go in her place, due to reigning U.S national pewter medalist and first alternate Bradie Tennell declining the offer to replace Liu.

Liu finished the season as the No. 1 skater in the ISU Season's World Ranking.

==== 2026–27 season: Hiatus ====
Liu announced via her Instagram that she would take a break and not compete in the 2026–27 season, with plans to return the season after.

== In media and popular culture ==
=== Show skating ===
Liu performed in the Sun Valley on Ice summer shows in 2019 and 2021. After her initial retirement announcement, she toured the U.S. with Stars on Ice in the spring of 2022. Liu rejoined Stars on Ice for its May 2025 U.S. leg. She rejoined Stars on Ice for its 2026 season, performing in both the U.S. and Japan legs.

=== Sponsorships, endorsements and partnerships ===
In early December 2020, Team Toyota announced Liu as one of the new additions to its roster of sponsored athletes. In the lead up to the 2022 Winter Olympics in Beijing, Liu signed a deal with toy manufacturer American Girl, and when fashion designer Ralph Lauren unveiled the opening ceremony uniforms for Team USA, he chose Liu as one of the athletes to model his collection. Heading into the 2026 Winter Olympics in Milan Cortina, Liu partnered with Nike and Samsung Galaxy. She also appeared in a commercial for Gillette Venus. Liu is represented by Yuki Saegusa at IMG. Liu appeared in a MrBeast video, alongside Erling Haaland, Simone Biles and LeBron James.

Following Olympic success, Liu collaborated with her favorite cereal brand Lucky Charms to release a limited edition cereal box featuring her likeness. Shortly after, Liu partnered with Nike to release a two-piece hoodie and T-shirt collection bearing a "monochromatic graphic that captures Liu mid-motion on the ice" on April 30. She then signed a year-long partnership with beauty retailer Sephora. She also received her own Fortnite emote from Epic Games.

In April 2026, Liu featured in the music video of Laufey's new song "Madwoman". In May, shortly after becoming a House Ambassador for Louis Vuitton, she appeared at the 2026 Met Gala.

=== Magazines ===
Liu was selected to be on the cover of the December 2019 edition of International Figure Skating Magazine. She was also featured in several news and fashion magazines, such as Teen Vogue, Time, Sports Illustrated, Elle, and Perfect.

=== Television ===
Following her win at the 2019 U.S. Championships, Liu made appearances on Today, The Tonight Show with Jimmy Fallon, and the 2019 Kids' Choice Sports, where she received an opportunity to present an award to alpine ski racer Lindsey Vonn. Liu returned to The Tonight Show with Jimmy Fallon before the 2026 Winter Olympics and was featured on 60 Minutes. At the 2026 iHeartRadio Music Awards, Liu presented the Artist of the Year award to singer-songwriter Taylor Swift. She also presented at the 2026 American Music Awards, presenting the Best Rock/Alternative Artist award to Twenty One Pilots.

== Personal life and views ==
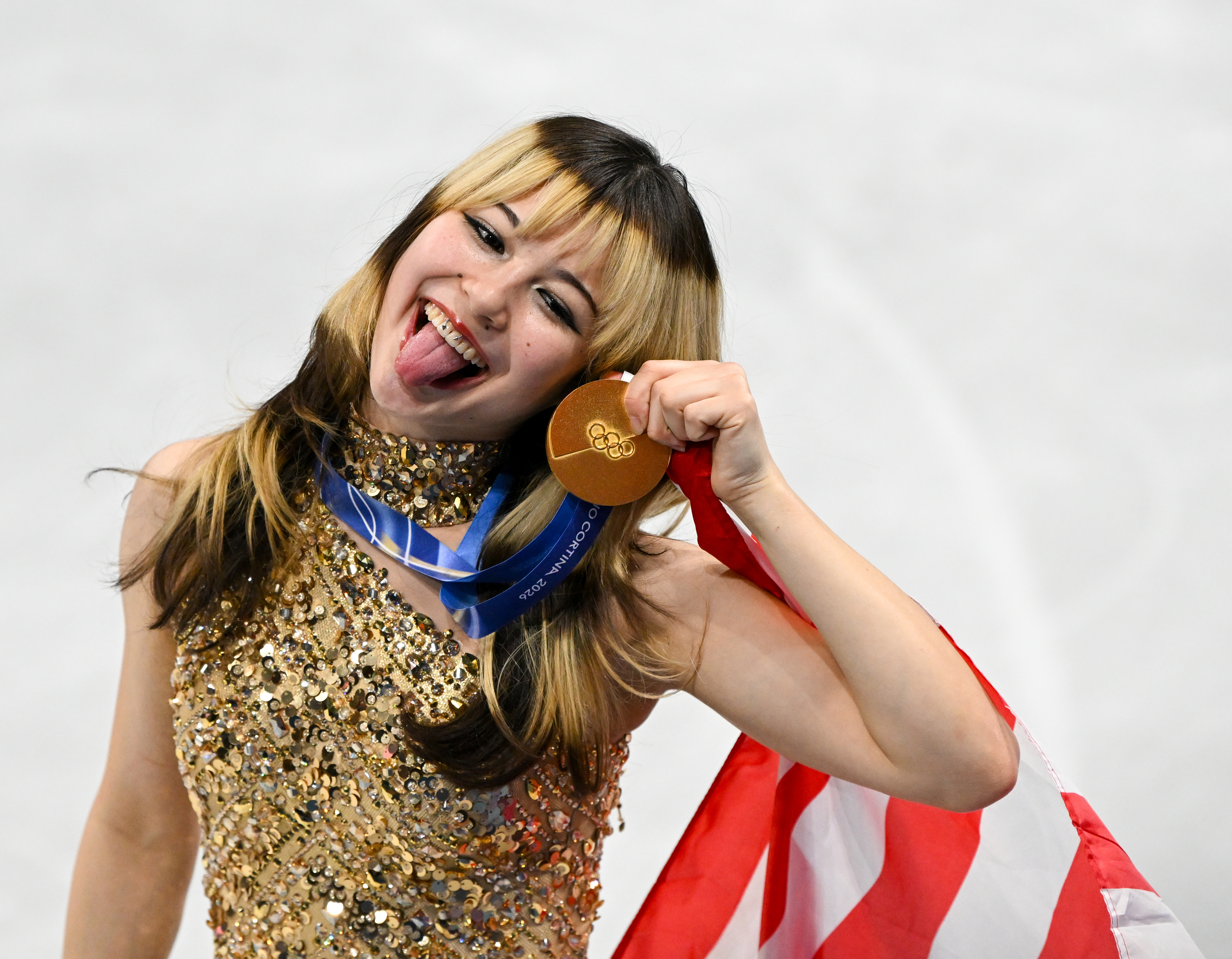
Liu's signature halo hairstyle and smiley piercing while posing during a medal ceremony at the 2026 Winter Olympics

Liu has a strong bond with her younger brother and sisters. In a 2025 interview, she said, "I love them to death." Liu has expressed support for immigrant rights in the United States. She is also an avid fan of manga and anime.

=== Style ===
Liu's halo hairstyle has been referenced in the press. According to Liu, she applies a band each year she skates, creating an appearance akin to "tree rings". She also has a lip frenulum piercing (smiley) that she pierced herself. In July 2026, The New York Times listed Liu as one of the 39-ish most stylish people of 2026.

=== Health and social media ===
In 2020, she temporarily limited her social media use because she found it "not worth it" and "exhausting" amidst the already overwhelming attention that comes with a gold medal. Liu has publicly discussed being diagnosed with attention deficit hyperactivity disorder. In interviews, she has described experiencing difficulty maintaining focus on a single topic and has characterized her communication style as shifting between subjects.

== Awards and recognition ==
In 2019, Liu was named to the inaugural Time 100 Next list that shines a light on the next generation of rising leaders. Michelle Kwan authored the recognition article. In May 2020, Liu became a Gold House A100 Honoree. The A100 List is released annually by Gold House and honors the 100 most impactful Asian Pacific leaders across a variety of industries such as business, technology, fashion and beauty, entertainment, music and sports.

In March 2026, following her Olympic gold medal wins, Liu was awarded the key to the city of Oakland. In April, she was also named to the Time 100 Most Influential list in 2026, and later in June for the inaugural Time 100 Sports of 2026. In May, Liu became a Gold House A100 Honoree again. At the 2026 ESPY Awards, she won the Best Breakthrough Athlete Award. At the 2026 Kids' Choice Awards, she won an award for Favorite Female Sports Star. SportsPro rated Liu No. 6 in its 17th annual 50 Most Marketable Athletes.

== Programs ==
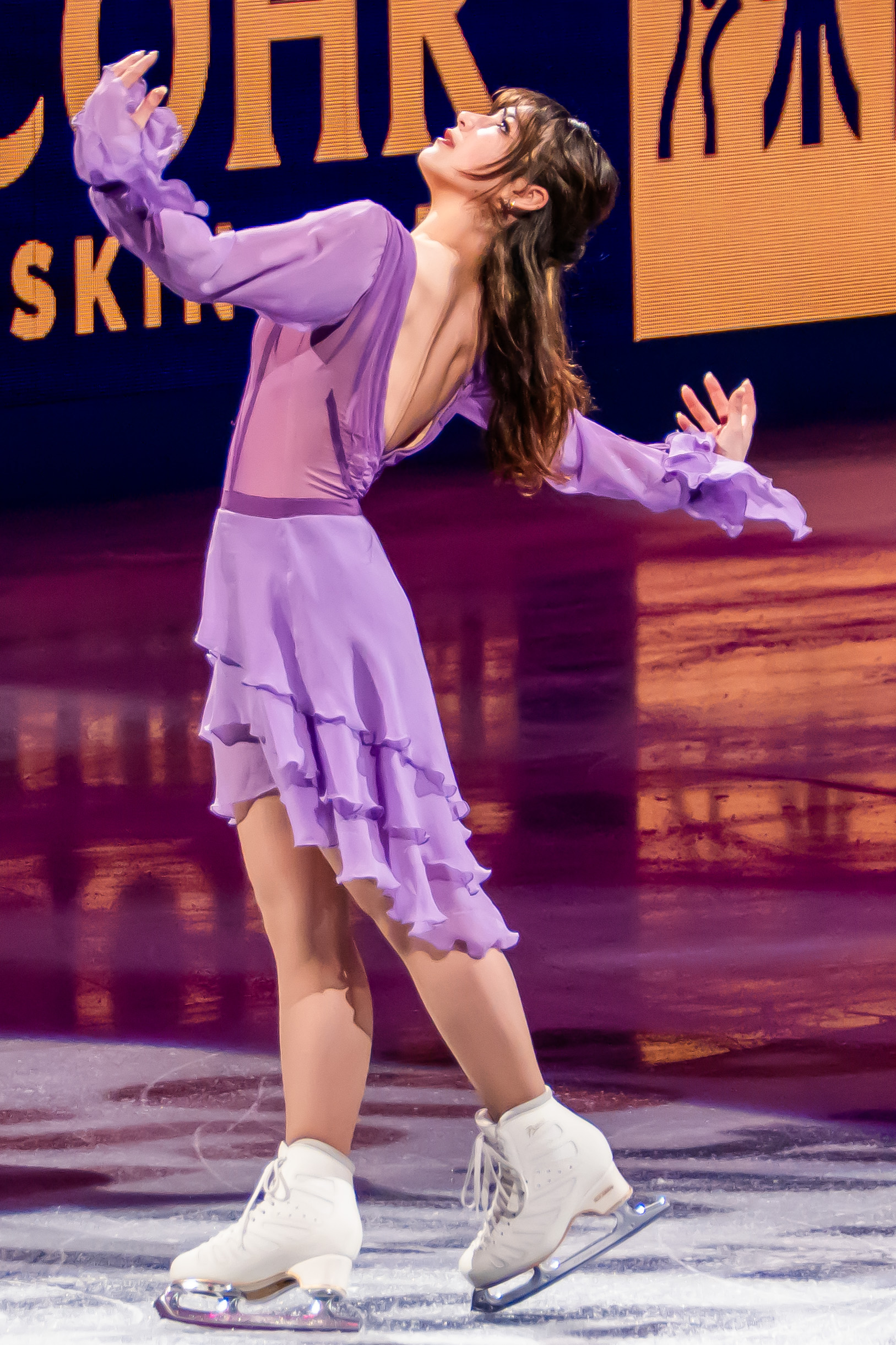
Liu performing her exhibition program at the 2025 World Championships

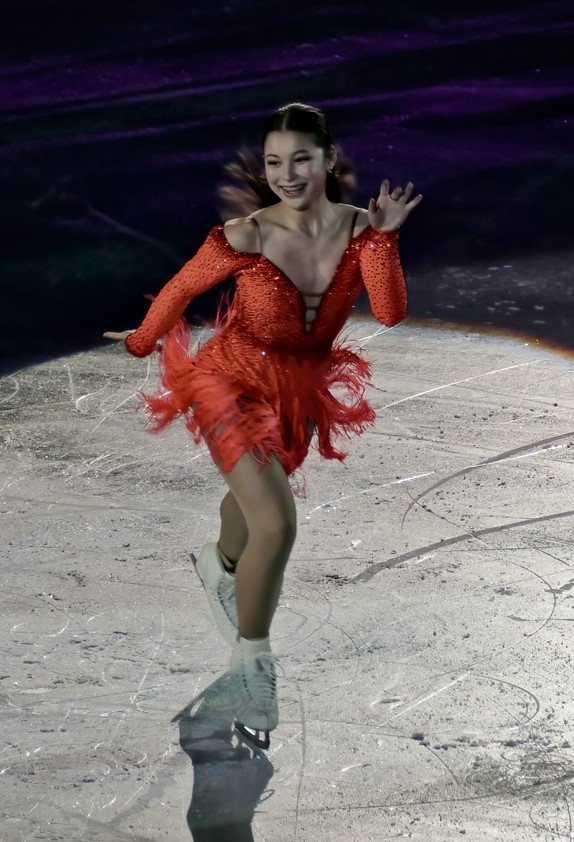
Liu performing her exhibition program at the 2022 World Championships

Competition and exhibition programs by season
| Season | Short program | Free skate program | Exhibition program |
|---|---|---|---|
| 2016–17 | "Puttin' On the Ritz": Composed by Irving Berlin | "Sing, Sing, Sing (With a Swing)": Performed by Benny Goodman | —N/a |
| 2017–18 | "Spanish Flame": Composed by Maxime Rodriguez | Les Misérables: Composed by Claude-Michel Schönberg | —N/a |
| 2018–19 | "Don't Rain on My Parade": Performed by Barbra Streisand; Choreo. by Rohene Ward | The Witches of Eastwick: Composed by John Williams; Choreo. by Cindy Stuart | "Don't Rain on My Parade" |
| 2019–20 | "Don't Rain on My Parade" | "New World Symphony": Composed by Jennifer Thomas; Choreo. by Lori Nichol | "Party Happening People": Performed by Deee-Lite; Choreo. by Rohene Ward |
| 2020–21 | La Strada: Composed by Nino Rota; Choreo. by Lori Nichol | "The Storm": Composed by Balázs Havasi; Choreo. by Lori Nichol | "It's Oh So Quiet": Performed by Björk |
| 2021–22 | "Gypsy Dance": From Don Quixote; Composed by Ludwig Minkus; Choreo. by Massimo Scali | Violin Concerto: Composed by Pyotr Ilyich Tchaikovsky; Performed by Joshua Bell; Choreo. by Massimo Scali | "Rainbow": Performed by Kacey Musgraves |
| 2021–22 | "Gypsy Dance": From Don Quixote; Composed by Ludwig Minkus; Choreo. by Massimo Scali | Violin Concerto: Composed by Pyotr Ilyich Tchaikovsky; Performed by Joshua Bell; Choreo. by Massimo Scali | "Loco": Performed by Itzy; Choreo. by Jean-Luc Baker |
| 2024–25 | "Promise": Performed by Laufey & Dan Wilson; Choreo. by Massimo Scali | "MacArthur Park Suite": Performed by Donna Summer; Choreo. by Massimo Scali | "Let You Break My Heart Again": Performed by Laufey & Philharmonia Orchestra |
| 2024–25 | "Promise": Performed by Laufey & Dan Wilson; Choreo. by Massimo Scali | "MacArthur Park Suite": Performed by Donna Summer; Choreo. by Massimo Scali | "Hero": Performed by Mariah Carey |
| 2025–26 | "Promise" | "MacArthur Park Suite" | "Stateside": Performed by PinkPantheress & Zara Larsson; Choreo. by Massimo Scali |
| 2025–26 | "This Is How It Feels": Performed by Laufey, D4vd; Choreo. by Massimo Scali | "Lady Gaga Medley": 1. G.U.Y.; 2. Bloody Mary; 3. Disease; 4. Bad Romance; Performed by Lady Gaga; Choreo. by Massimo Scali | "Slow Dancing in the Dark": Performed by Joji; Choreo. by Massimo Scali |
| 2025–26 | —N/a | "Lady Gaga Medley (Revamped)": 1. Chromatica; 2. Paparazzi; 3. Bad Romance; Performed by Lady Gaga; Choreo. by Massimo Scali | "Medley": 1. Slow Dancing in the Dark; 2. Bad Romance; Choreo. by Massimo Scali |

=== Programs as a professional skater ===
- Programs performed at three or more ice shows within the same year are only listed with selected shows.
- Show openings and finales are not included in the list.

Show programs as a professional skater by year
| Year | Program | Event |
|---|---|---|
| 2022 | "Loco" | Stars on Ice U.S. |
| 2022 | "Run2U": Performed by STAYC | Stars on Ice U.S. |
| 2022 | "Oh My God": Performed by I-dle | The Ice (Japan) |
| 2022 | "California Love": Performed by 2Pac & Dr. Dre | The Ice (Japan) |
| 2025 | "MacArthur Park Suite" | Stars on Ice U.S. |
| 2025 | "Slow Dancing in the Dark" | Stars on Ice U.S. |
| 2026 | "Promise" | Stars on Ice U.S. |
| 2026 | "Stateside" | Stars on Ice U.S. |

== Competitive highlights ==
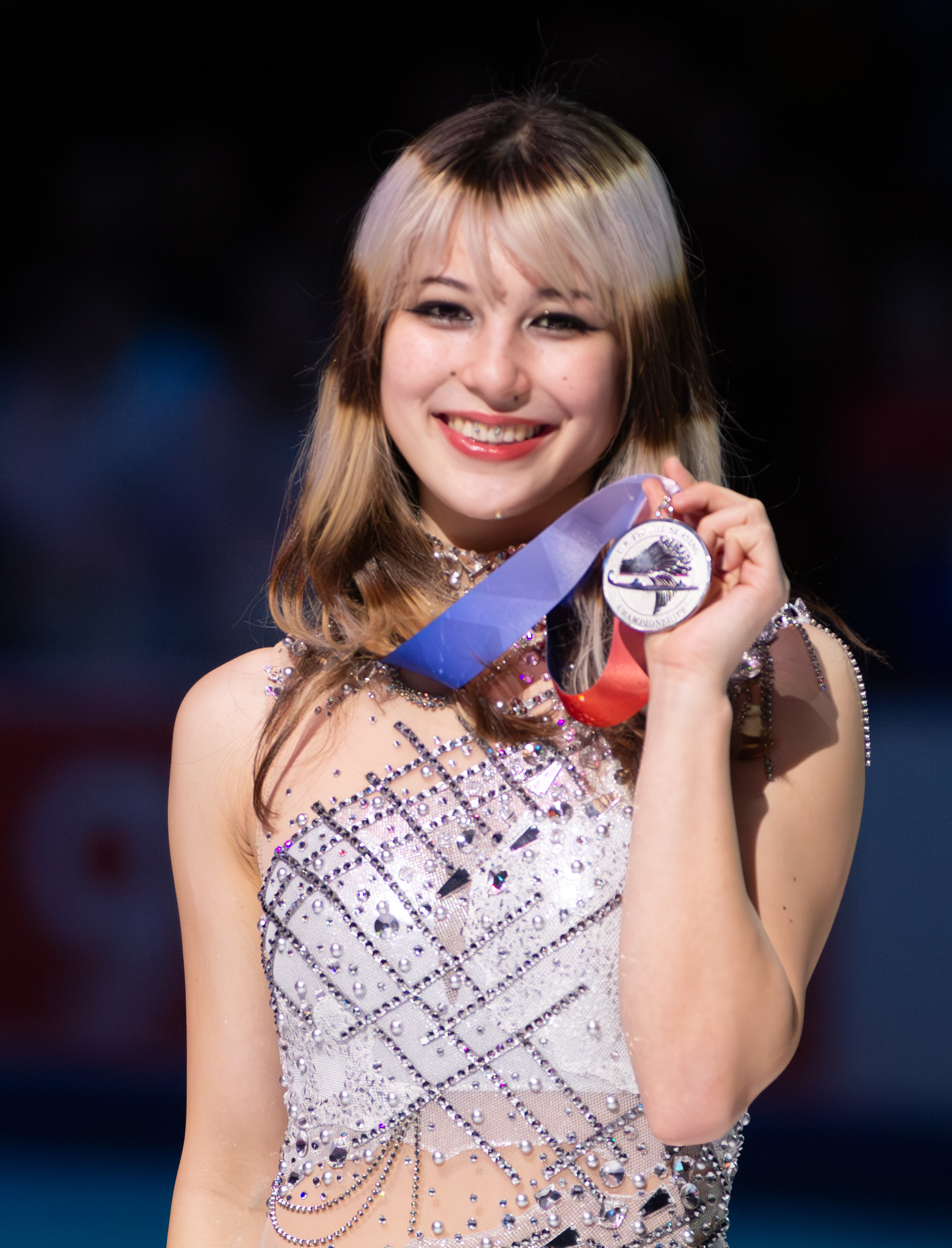
Liu after winning the 2026 U.S. Figure Skating Championships silver medal

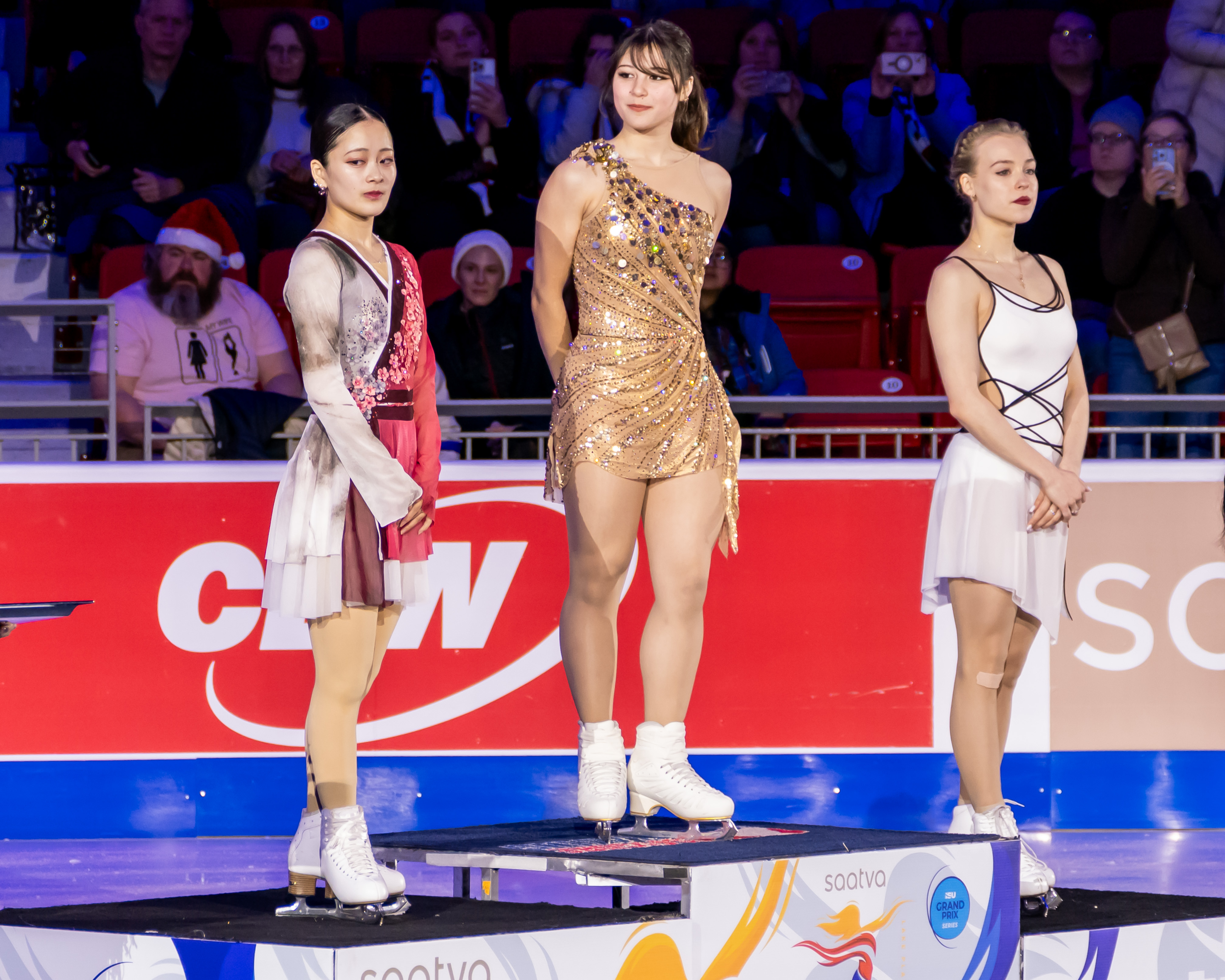
Liu (center) on the podium at 2025 Skate America with Rinka Watanabe (left) and Anastasiia Gubanova (right)

- GP – Event of the ISU Grand Prix Series
- JGP – Event of the ISU Junior Grand Prix Series
- CS – Event of the ISU Challenger Series
- TBD – Assigned
- WD – Withdrew from event
- Medals at team events are awarded for the team results only. Individual placements at team events are listed in parentheses.

Competition placements at senior level
| Season | 2018–19 | 2019–20 | 2020–21 | 2021–22 | 2024–25 | 2025–26 |
|---|---|---|---|---|---|---|
| Winter Olympics | | | | 6th | | 1st |
| Winter Olympics (Team event) | | | | | | 1st |
| World Championships | | | | 3rd | 1st | |
| Four Continents Championships | | | | | 4th | |
| Grand Prix Final | | | | | | 1st |
| U.S. Championships | 1st | 1st | 4th | WD | 2nd | 2nd |
| World Team Trophy | | | | | 1st (1st) | |
| GP Cup of China | | | | | | 2nd |
| GP NHK Trophy | | | | 4th | 4th | |
| GP Skate America | | | | | | 1st |
| GP Skate Canada | | | | 5th | 6th | |
| CS Budapest Trophy | | | | | 1st | |
| CS Golden Spin of Zagreb | | | | | 1st | |
| CS Lombardia Trophy | | | | 1st | | 4th |
| CS Nebelhorn Trophy | | | | 1st | | |
| CS Cranberry Cup | | | | 1st | | |

Competition placements at junior level
| Season | 2017–18 | 2019–20 |
|---|---|---|
| World Junior Championships | | 3rd |
| Junior Grand Prix Final | | 2nd |
| U.S. Championships | 1st | |
| JGP Poland | | 1st |
| JGP United States | | 1st |

== Detailed results ==
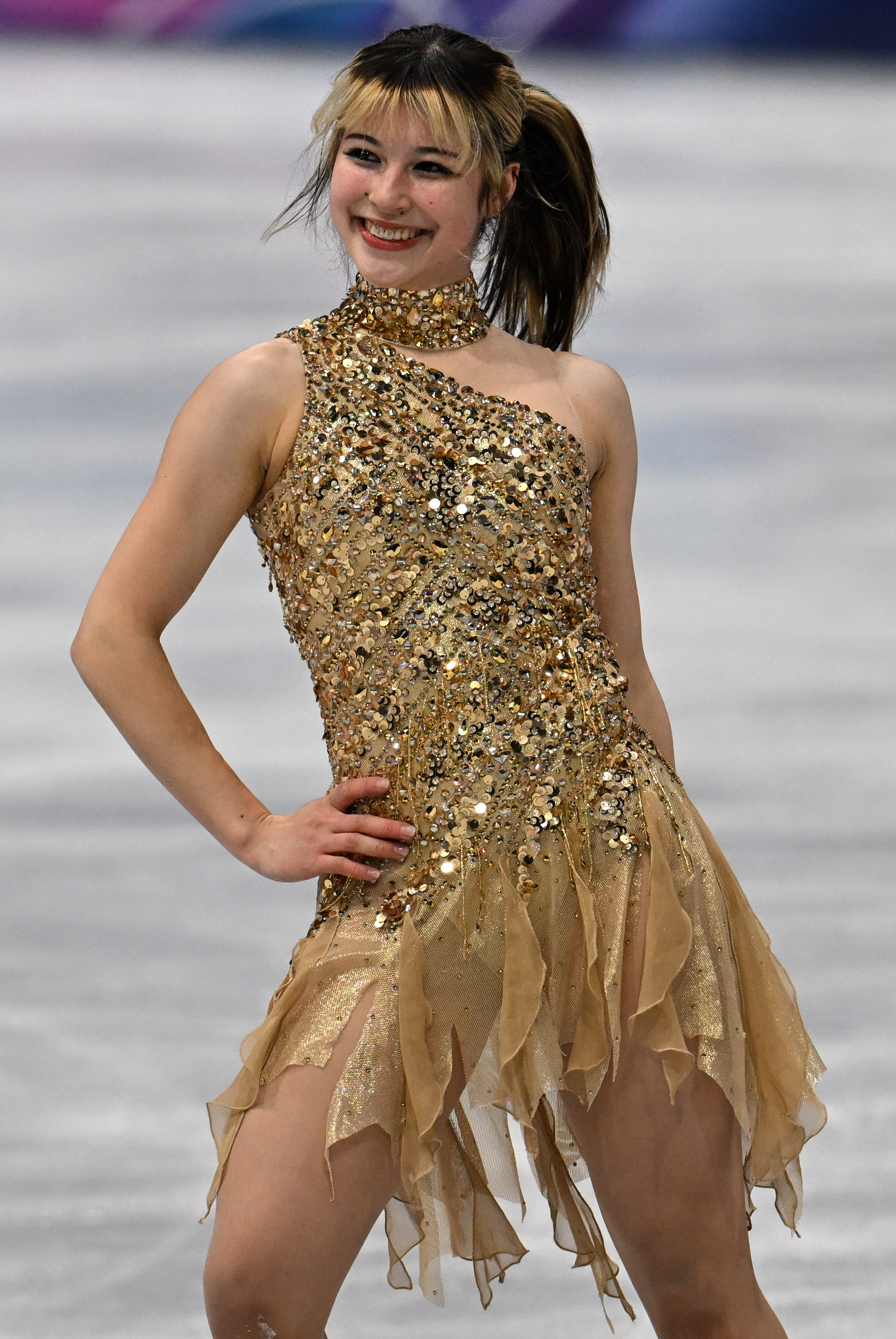
Liu after her free skate at the 2026 Winter Olympics

ISU personal best scores in the +5/-5 GOE System
| Segment | Type | Score | Event |
|---|---|---|---|
| Total | **TSS** | **226.79** | 2026 Winter Olympics |
| Short program | **TSS** | **76.59** | 2026 Winter Olympics |
| Short program | TES | 41.34 | 2026 Winter Olympics |
| Short program | PCS | 35.38 | 2026 Winter Olympics (Team event) |
| Free skating | **TSS** | **150.97** | 2025 World Team Trophy |
| Free skating | TES | 83.94 | 2019 JGP Poland |
| Free skating | PCS | 72.46 | 2026 Winter Olympics |

=== Senior level ===
- Small medals for the short program and free skating are only awarded at ISU Championships.
- Medals at team events are awarded for the team results only. Individual placements at team events are listed in parentheses.
- ISU Personal Bests highlighted in **bold**.

Results in the 2018–19 season
| Date | Event | SP | | FS | | Total | |
| Date | Event | P | Score | P | Score | P | Score |
|---|---|---|---|---|---|---|---|
| Jan 19–27, 2019 | (United States) 2019 U.S. Championships | 2 | 73.89 | 1 | 143.62 | 1 | 217.51 |

Results in the 2019–20 season
| Date | Event | SP | | FS | | Total | |
| Date | Event | P | Score | P | Score | P | Score |
|---|---|---|---|---|---|---|---|
| Jan 20–26, 2020 | (United States) 2020 U.S. Championships | 2 | 75.40 | 1 | 160.12 | 1 | 235.52 |

Results in the 2020–21 season
| Date | Event | SP | | FS | | Total | |
| Date | Event | P | Score | P | Score | P | Score |
|---|---|---|---|---|---|---|---|
| Jan 11–21, 2021 | (United States) 2021 U.S. Championships | 2 | 76.36 | 4 | 137.03 | 4 | 213.39 |

Results in the 2021–22 season
| Date | Event | SP | | FS | | Total | |
| Date | Event | P | Score | P | Score | P | Score |
|---|---|---|---|---|---|---|---|
| Aug 11–15, 2021 | (United States) 2021 Cranberry Cup International | 1 | 71.42 | 1 | 134.32 | 1 | 205.74 |
| Sep 9–12, 2021 | (Italy) 2021 CS Lombardia Trophy | 1 | 74.31 | 1 | 144.93 | 1 | 219.24 |
| Sep 22–25, 2021 | (Germany) 2021 CS Nebelhorn Trophy | 1 | 70.86 | 1 | 136.54 | 1 | 207.40 |
| Oct 29–31, 2021 | 2021 Skate Canada International | 4 | 73.63 | 7 | 132.90 | 5 | 206.53 |
| Nov 12–14, 2021 | (Japan) 2021 NHK Trophy | 4 | 67.72 | 3 | 135.18 | 4 | 202.90 |
| Jan 2–9, 2022 | (United States) 2022 U.S. Championships | 3 | 71.42 | —N/a | —N/a | – | WD |
| Feb 15–17, 2022 | (China) 2022 Winter Olympics | 7 | 69.50 | 6 | 139.45 | 6 | 208.95 |
| Mar 21–27, 2022 | (France) 2022 World Championships | 5 | 71.91 | 3 | 139.28 | 3 | 211.19 |

Results in the 2024–25 season
| Date | Event | SP | | FS | | Total | |
| Date | Event | P | Score | P | Score | P | Score |
|---|---|---|---|---|---|---|---|
| Oct 11–13, 2024 | (Hungary) 2024 CS Budapest Trophy | 1 | 68.83 | 2 | 123.94 | 1 | 192.77 |
| Oct 25–27, 2024 | 2024 Skate Canada International | 2 | 67.68 | 7 | 120.01 | 6 | 187.69 |
| Nov 8–10, 2024 | (Japan) 2024 NHK Trophy | 4 | 65.03 | 4 | 125.72 | 4 | 190.75 |
| Dec 5–7, 2024 | (Croatia) 2024 CS Golden Spin of Zagreb | 2 | 68.06 | 1 | 129.65 | 1 | 197.71 |
| Jan 20–26, 2025 | (United States) 2025 U.S. Championships | 1 | 76.36 | 2 | 138.97 | 2 | 215.33 |
| Feb 19–23, 2025 | (South Korea) 2025 Four Continents Championships | 4 | 67.09 | 4 | 131.46 | 4 | 198.55 |
| Mar 25–30, 2025 | (United States) 2025 World Championships | 1 | 74.58 | 1 | 148.39 | 1 | 222.97 |
| Apr 17–20, 2025 | (Japan) 2025 World Team Trophy | 1 | 75.70 | 1 | **150.97** | 1 (1) | 226.67 |

Results in the 2025–26 season
| Date | Event | SP | | FS | | Total | |
| Date | Event | P | Score | P | Score | P | Score |
|---|---|---|---|---|---|---|---|
| Sep 11–14, 2025 | (Italy) 2025 CS Lombardia Trophy | 1 | 69.62 | 5 | 128.22 | 4 | 197.84 |
| Oct 24–26, 2025 | 2025 Cup of China | 1 | 74.61 | 2 | 137.46 | 2 | 212.07 |
| Nov 14–16, 2025 | (United States) 2025 Skate America | 2 | 73.73 | 1 | 140.54 | 1 | 214.27 |
| Dec 4–7, 2025 | (Japan) 2025–26 Grand Prix Final | 2 | 75.79 | 3 | 146.70 | 1 | 222.49 |
| Jan 4–11, 2026 | (United States) 2026 U.S. Championships | 2 | 81.11 | 3 | 147.80 | 2 | 228.91 |
| Feb 6–8, 2026 | (Italy) 2026 Winter Olympics – Team event | 2 | 74.90 | —N/a | —N/a | 1 | —N/a |
| Feb 17–19, 2026 | (Italy) 2026 Winter Olympics | 3 | **76.59** | 1 | 150.20 | 1 | **226.79** |

=== Junior level ===
Results in the 2017–18 season
| Date | Event | SP | | FS | | Total | |
| Date | Event | P | Score | P | Score | P | Score |
|---|---|---|---|---|---|---|---|
| December 29, 2017 –Jan 8, 2018 | (United States) 2018 U.S. Championships (Junior) | 1 | 63.83 | 1 | 120.33 | 1 | 184.16 |

Results in the 2019–20 season
| Date | Event | SP | | FS | | Total | |
| Date | Event | P | Score | P | Score | P | Score |
|---|---|---|---|---|---|---|---|
| Aug 28–31, 2019 | 2019 JGP United States | 1 | 69.30 | 1 | 138.80 | 1 | 208.10 |
| Sep 18–21, 2019 | 2019 JGP Poland | 4 | 64.11 | 1 | 138.99 | 1 | 203.10 |
| Dec 5–8, 2019 | (Italy) 2019–20 Junior Grand Prix Final | 1 | 71.19 | 2 | 133.46 | 2 | 204.65 |
| Mar 2–9, 2020 | (Estonia) 2020 World Junior Championships | 4 | 67.52 | 3 | 137.31 | 3 | 204.83 |

== Filmography ==
=== Music Videos ===
| Year | Title | Artist | Role | Ref. |
|---|---|---|---|---|
| 2026 | "Madwoman" | Laufey | Herself | |
