= Figure skating at the 2026 Winter Olympics – Women's singles =

Women's singles skating at the XXV Olympic Winter Games
- Venue: Milano Ice Skating Arena; Milan, Italy
- Dates: 17 and 19 February 2026
- Competitors: 29 from 22 nations
- Winning score: 226.79 points

Medalists
1st place, gold medalist(s)		Alysa Liu	United States
2nd place, silver medalist(s)		Kaori Sakamoto	Japan
3rd place, bronze medalist(s)		Ami Nakai	Japan

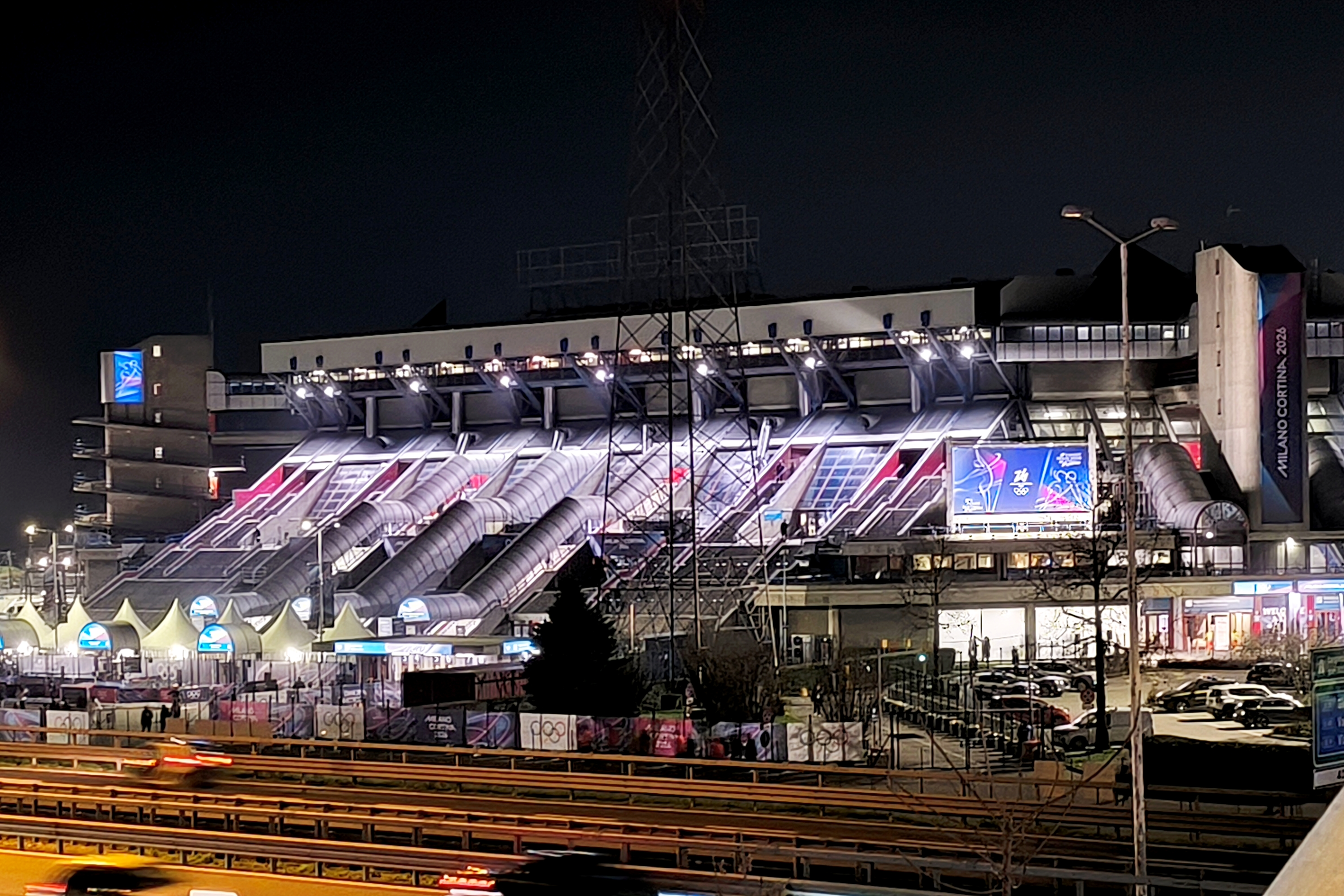
The figure skating events at the 2026 Winter Olympics were held at the Milano Ice Skating Arena in Milan, Italy.

The women's singles figure skating competition at the 2026 Winter Olympics was held on 17 and 19 February 2026 at the Milano Ice Skating Arena in Milan, Italy, and featured 29 skaters from 22 nations. Alysa Liu of the United States won the gold medal, while Kaori Sakamoto and Ami Nakai, both of Japan, won the silver and bronze medals, respectively. This was Liu's second gold medal at the 2026 Winter Olympics, having earlier been part of the American team that won the figure skating team event. Liu was the first American to win an Olympic gold medal in individual figure skating since 2002. This was also the first time since 2014 that the gold medal was not won by a skater from Russia. Sakamoto's silver medal was her second at the 2026 Olympics, as she had also been part of the Japanese team that finished second in the team event.

== Background ==
In October 2023, the International Olympic Committee suspended the Olympic Committee of Russia. The skating federations of Russia and Belarus were each permitted to nominate one skater or team from each discipline to participate at the Skate to Milano as a means to qualify for the 2026 Winter Olympics as Individual Neutral Athletes. Each nominee was required to pass a special screening process to assess whether they had displayed any active support for the 2022 Russian invasion of Ukraine or had any contractual links to the Russian or Belarusian military. Adeliia Petrosian of Russia and Viktoriia Safonova of Belarus earned spots at the Olympics as Individual Neutral Athletes.

The women's singles event was one of five figure skating competitions contested at the 2026 Winter Olympics in Milan, Italy. It was held at the Milano Ice Skating Arena over two days: the short program took place on 17 February and the free skating took place on 19 February. The competition featured 29 skaters representing 22 nations. Meda Variakojytė made history as the first woman from Lithuania to qualify for the Winter Olympics in single skating.

The three skaters representing the United States – Amber Glenn, Isabeau Levito, and Alysa Liu – who christened themselves the "Blade Angels" (a hybrid take on Blades of Glory and Charlie's Angels), were all considered legitimate contenders for an Olympic medal in the women's event. All three were U.S. national champions: Liu in 2019 and 2020; Levito in 2023; and Glenn in 2024, 2025, and 2026. Liu, who had competed at the 2022 Winter Olympics and then retired shortly thereafter, returned to competitive skating in 2024, having "recaptured her love" for the sport as well as taking ownership of her training regimen and the creative decision-making process. She had won the gold medal at the 2025 World Figure Skating Championships. Glenn and Liu had both been part of the American team that had earlier won the team event. Glenn had won the 2024 Grand Prix of Figure Skating Final, while Liu had won the 2025 Grand Prix Final, and all three had won Grand Prix events over the past several years.

The three skaters from Japan – Mone Chiba, Ami Nakai, and Kaori Sakamoto – were also seen as contenders for an Olympic medal. The three skaters from the United States and the three skaters from Japan had constituted the top six at the 2025 World Championships. Sakamoto was a three-time world champion, six-time Japanese national champion, the 2022 Winter Olympic bronze medalist, and had already won a silver medal at the 2026 Olympics when the Japanese team finished second in the team event. Chiba had won the bronze medal at the 2025 World Championships, as well as at the 2026 Japanese Championships, while Nakai, in only her first season competing at the senior level, won the silver medal at the 2026 Four Continents Figure Skating Championships, and finished in fourth place at the 2026 Japanese Championships.

== Qualification ==
Twenty-four quota spots in the women's event were allocated to countries based on results at the 2025 World Figure Skating Championships. An additional five spots were awarded at the Skate to Milano.

Qualifying nations in women's singles
Event	Skaters per NOC	Qualifying NOCs	Total skaters
2025 World Championships	3	United States; Japan	24
2025 World Championships	2	South Korea; Switzerland	24
2025 World Championships	1	Belgium; Estonia; Canada; Italy; Kazakhstan; France; Israel; Austria; Finland; Romania; Poland; Bulgaria; Great Britain; Lithuania	24
Skate to Milano	1	Individual Neutral Athletes (Adeliia Petrosian); Georgia; Belgium; Individual Neutral Athletes (Viktoriia Safonova); China	5
Total			29

== Required performance elements ==
Women performed their short programs on 17 February. Lasting 2 minutes 40 seconds (+/− 10 seconds), the short program had to include the following elements: one double or triple Axel; one triple jump; one jump combination consisting of a double jump and a triple jump or two triple jumps; one flying spin; one layback spin, sideways leaning spin, camel spin or sit spin without a change of foot; one spin combination with a change of foot; and one step sequence using the full ice surface.

The twenty-four highest-scoring skaters after the short program advanced to the free skating on 19 February. Lasting 4 minutes (+/− 10 seconds), the free skate had to include the following elements: seven jump elements, of which one had to be an Axel-type jump; three spins, of which one had to be a spin combination, one a flying spin, and one a spin with only one position; one step sequence; and one choreographic sequence.

== Judging ==
Skaters were judged according to the required technical elements of their program (such as jumps and spins), as well as the overall presentation of their program, based on three program components (skating skills, presentation, and composition). Each technical element in a figure skating performance was assigned a predetermined base point value and scored by a panel of nine judges on a scale from −5 to +5 based on the quality of its execution. Each Grade of Execution (GOE) from –5 to +5 was assigned a value as indicated on the Scale of Values. For example, a triple Axel was worth a base value of 8.00 points, and a GOE of +3 was worth 2.40 points, so a triple Axel with a GOE of +3 earned 10.40 points. The judging panel's GOE for each element was determined by calculating the trimmed mean (the average after discarding the highest and lowest scores). The panel's scores for all elements were added together to generate a Total Elements Score. At the same time, the judges evaluated each performance based on the five aforementioned program components and assigned each a score from 0.25 to 10 in 0.25-point increments. The judging panel's final score for each program component was also determined by calculating the trimmed mean. Those scores were then multiplied by the factor shown on the chart below; the results were added together to generate a total Program Component Score.

Program component factoring
Discipline	Short program	Free skate
Women	1.33	2.67

Deductions were applied for certain violations, such as time infractions or falls. The Total Elements Score and Program Component Score were then added together, minus any deductions, to generate a final performance score for each skater.

== Results ==
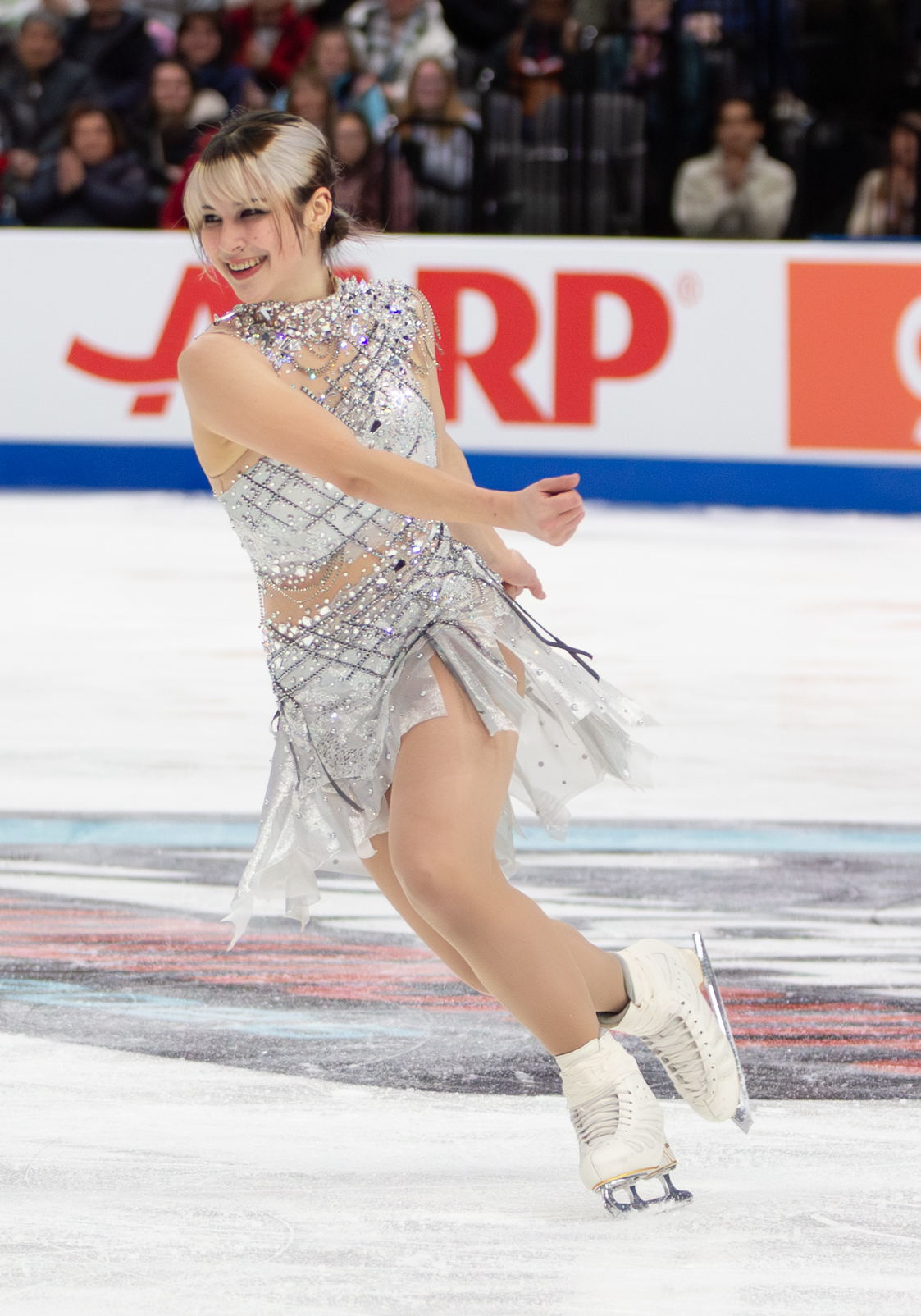
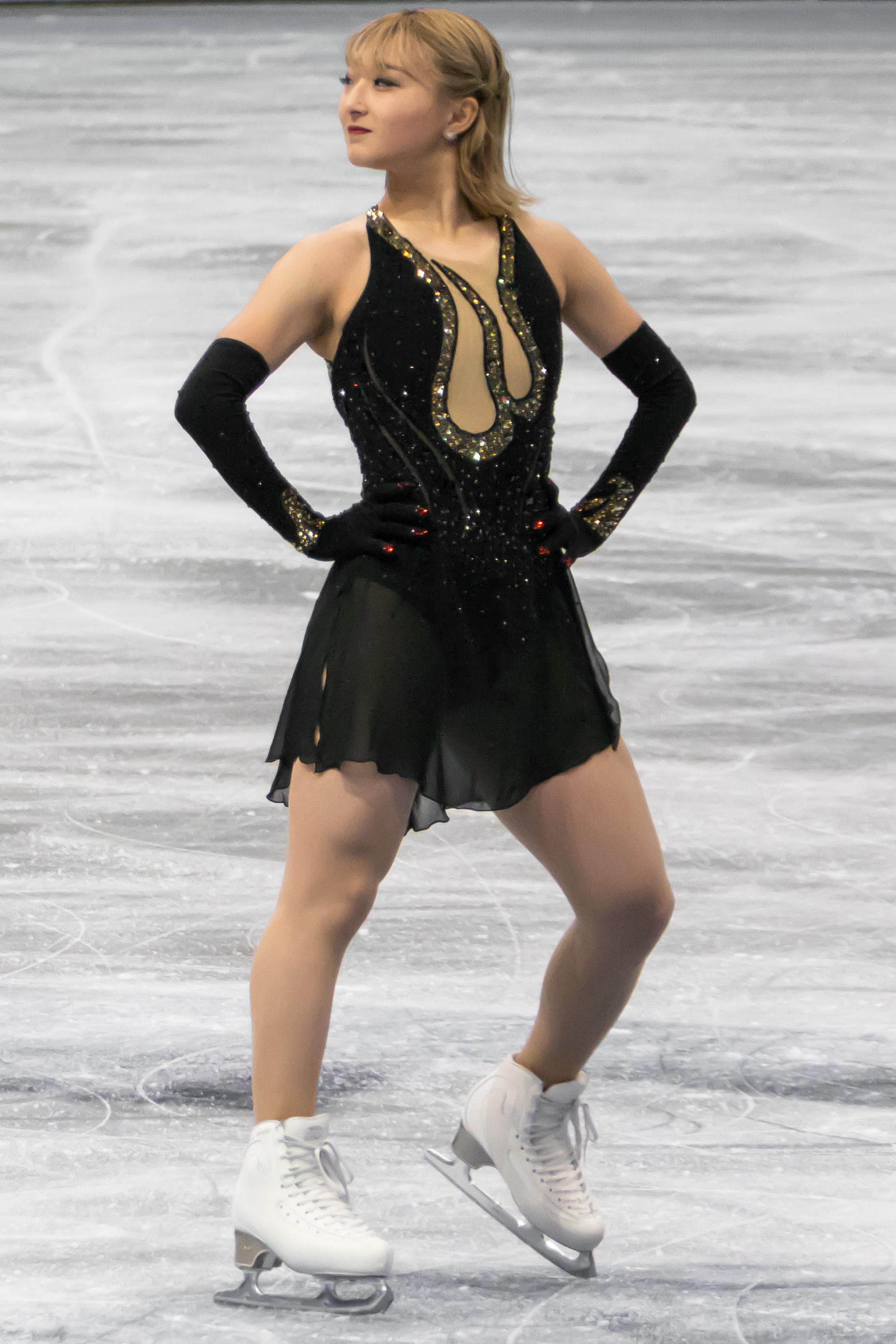
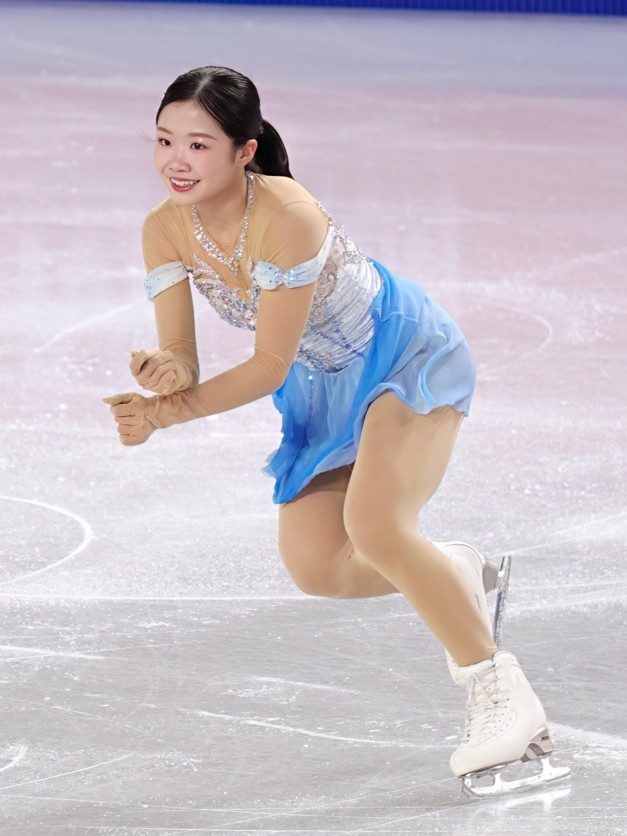
The gold, silver, and bronze medalists from the women's event at the 2026 Winter Olympics (from left to right):
Alysa Liu of the United States (gold), Kaori Sakamoto of Japan (silver), and Ami Nakai of Japan (bronze)

Code key

- TSS – Total Segment Score
- TES – Total Elements Score
- PCS – Program Component Score
- CO – Composition
- PR – Presentation
- SS – Skating skills
- DED – Deductions

=== Short program ===
The women's short program took place on 17 February. Ami Nakai of Japan finished in first place with a season-best score of 78.71, successfully performing a triple Axel, a triple Lutz-triple toe loop jump combination, and a triple loop. It was Nakai's first season competing at the senior level. Kaori Sakamoto, also of Japan, finished in second place. Sakamoto had earlier confirmed that she would retire at the end of this season, and her short program was set to "Time to Say Goodbye". Alysa Liu of the United States finished in third place with a personal-best score of 76.59. Mone Chiba of Japan finished in fourth place, while Adeliia Petrosian of Russia, competing as an Individual Neutral Athlete, finished in fifth. Since Petrosian had no world ranking – Russian skaters had been barred from all international competitions except for the Olympics – and performance order for the short program was based on world ranking, she was the second to skate, scoring higher than most of the other skaters who performed after her. Amber Glenn of the United States successfully landed her triple Axel, but an error on her planned triple loop caused her to receive no points for that element, placing her in thirteenth place.

Women's short program results
Pl.	Skater	Nation	TSS	TES	PCS	CO	PR	SS	DED
1	Ami Nakai	Japan	78.71	45.02	33.69	8.25	8.54	8.54	0.00
2	Kaori Sakamoto	Japan	77.23	40.08	37.15	9.25	9.29	9.39	0.00
3	Alysa Liu	United States	76.59	41.34	35.25	8.75	9.11	8.64	0.00
4	Mone Chiba	Japan	74.00	38.72	35.28	8.89	8.89	8.75	0.00
5	Adeliia Petrosian	Individual Neutral Athletes	72.89	40.44	32.45	8.04	8.29	8.07	0.00
6	Anastasiia Gubanova	Georgia	71.77	38.28	33.49	8.32	8.61	8.25	0.00
7	Loena Hendrickx	Belgium	70.93	36.92	34.01	8.39	8.68	8.50	0.00
8	Isabeau Levito	United States	70.84	36.77	34.07	8.54	8.57	8.50	0.00
9	Lee Hae-in	South Korea	70.07	37.61	32.46	8.18	8.11	8.11	0.00
10	Niina Petrõkina	Estonia	69.63	36.80	32.83	8.32	8.29	8.07	0.00
11	Nina Pinzarrone	Belgium	68.97	36.86	32.11	8.07	8.14	7.93	0.00
12	Sofia Samodelkina	Kazakhstan	68.47	36.42	32.05	8.00	8.21	7.89	0.00
13	Amber Glenn	United States	67.39	34.19	33.20	8.39	8.07	8.50	0.00
14	Shin Ji-a	South Korea	65.66	35.79	30.87	7.82	7.46	7.93	1.00
15	Iida Karhunen	Finland	65.06	36.22	28.84	7.29	7.32	7.07	0.00
16	Julia Sauter	Romania	63.13	34.15	28.98	7.07	7.43	7.29	0.00
17	Olga Mikutina	Austria	61.72	32.64	29.08	7.43	7.32	7.11	0.00
18	Lara Naki Gutmann	Italy	61.56	29.50	32.06	8.25	7.86	8.00	0.00
19	Ekaterina Kurakova	Poland	60.14	31.56	28.58	7.07	7.46	6.96	0.00
20	Zhang Ruiyang	China	59.38	32.64	26.74	6.86	6.64	6.61	0.00
21	Kimmy Repond	Switzerland	59.20	29.84	29.36	7.39	7.36	7.32	0.00
22	Mariia Seniuk	Israel	58.61	32.15	26.46	6.61	6.68	6.61	0.00
23	Livia Kaiser	Switzerland	55.69	30.62	26.07	6.50	6.46	6.64	1.00
24	Lorine Schild	France	55.63	29.32	26.31	6.68	6.43	6.68	0.00
25	Madeline Schizas	Canada	55.38	26.39	28.99	7.36	7.11	7.32	0.00
26	Viktoriia Safonova	Individual Neutral Athletes	54.57	29.15	25.42	6.57	6.11	6.43	0.00
27	Meda Variakojytė	Lithuania	53.86	29.77	24.09	6.14	6.18	5.79	0.00
28	Alexandra Feigin	Bulgaria	53.42	28.77	24.65	6.14	6.21	6.18	0.00
29	Kristen Spours	Great Britain	45.54	21.55	23.99	6.04	5.86	6.14	0.00

=== Free skating ===
The women's free skate took place on 19 February. Alysa Liu rallied back from third place to win the gold medal, making her the first American woman to win a gold medal in the individual event since Sarah Hughes in 2002, and the first American woman to win any medal in single skating since Sasha Cohen in 2006. Liu's performance to Donna Summer's "MacArthur Park Suite" was described by Nick McCarvel of Olympics.com as "nearly flawless" and received a standing ovation from the audience. It was her second gold medal at the 2026 Olympics, having been part of the American team who earlier won the team event.

Kaori Sakamoto finished in second place after missing one of her jumps, while Ami Nakai had errors with some of her jumps, but the high difficulty level of her routine allowed her to win the bronze medal. Sakamoto experienced an awkward landing on her triple flip, which forced her to forego the triple toe loop she had planned in combination. The point value of that missing toe loop was more than the 1.89-point difference that separated Sakamoto from Liu. Sakamoto had won the bronze medal at the 2022 Winter Olympics, a win that she described as a "miracle" considering the circumstances of the women's event in 2022, where the three Russian skaters had been expected to sweep the podium; however, she added, "I have a better medal [now]. ... However, I feel very frustrated and disappointed because I have tried so hard for the past four years." Mone Chiba delivered a solid performance and finished in fourth place.

Amber Glenn, who sat in thirteenth place after the short program, scored 147.52 in the free skate, putting her in the lead for a large part of the competition. Glenn nailed her triple Axel, but had to catch herself during her last triple loop. She ended up finishing in fifth place. Adeliia Petrosian finished in sixth place after she fell on her quadruple toe loop and scuttled a planned second quadruple jump. None of the women at the 2026 Winter Olympics performed a quadruple jump. This marked the first time since 2010 that the gold medal in the women's event was not won by a Russian skater.

Women's free skate results
Pl.	Skater	Nation	TSS	TES	PCS	CO	PR	SS	DED
1	Alysa Liu	United States	150.20	77.74	72.46	8.96	9.32	8.86	0.00
2	Kaori Sakamoto	Japan	147.67	72.83	74.84	9.21	9.43	9.39	0.00
3	Amber Glenn	United States	147.52	78.87	68.65	8.43	8.64	8.64	0.00
4	Mone Chiba	Japan	143.88	74.46	69.42	8.54	8.64	8.82	0.00
5	Adeliia Petrosian	Individual Neutral Athletes	141.64	76.93	65.71	8.18	8.36	8.07	00
6	Niina Petrõkina	Estonia	141.19	74.82	66.37	8.36	8.36	8.14	0.00
7	Shin Ji-a	South Korea	141.02	75.05	65.97	8.14	8.25	8.32	0.00
8	Lee Hae-in	South Korea	140.49	74.15	66.34	8.21	8.32	8.32	0.00
9	Ami Nakai	Japan	140.45	72.53	67.92	8.29	8.54	8.61	0.00
10	Sofia Samodelkina	Kazakhstan	138.99	73.77	65.22	8.00	8.29	8.14	0.00
11	Anastasiia Gubanova	Georgia	138.22	71.39	66.83	8.21	8.50	8.32	0.00
12	Lara Naki Gutmann	Italy	134.19	69.73	64.46	8.04	8.21	7.89	0.00
13	Isabeau Levito	United States	131.96	64.50	68.46	8.75	8.50	8.39	1.00
14	Nina Pinzarrone	Belgium	131.33	67.63	63.70	7.93	8.11	7.82	0.00
15	Loena Hendrickx	Belgium	128.72	61.49	67.23	8.32	8.50	8.36	0.00
16	Julia Sauter	Romania	127.80	66.28	61.52	7.54	7.86	7.64	0.00
17	Iida Karhunen	Finland	127.73	68.43	59.30	7.50	7.39	7.32	.00
18	Olga Mikutina	Austria	123.87	64.06	59.81	7.54	7.50	7.36	0.00
19	Zhang Ruiyang	China	118.65	61.54	57.11	7.11	7.21	7.07	0.00
20	Livia Kaiser	Switzerland	115.83	62.95	53.88	6.61	6.75	6.82	1.00
21	Ekaterina Kurakova	Poland	113.23	56.60	56.63	6.96	7.18	7.07	0.00
22	Lorine Schild	France	111.45	59.41	52.04	6.46	6.39	6.64	0.00
23	Kimmy Repond	Switzerland	100.34	51.21	53.13	6.79	6.32	6.79	4.00
24	Mariia Seniuk	Israel	94.00	44.64	50.36	6.29	6.07	6.50	1.00

=== Overall ===
Women's results
Rank	Skater	Nation	Total	SP		FS	
1st place, gold medalist(s)	Alysa Liu	United States	226.79	3	76.59	1	150.20
2nd place, silver medalist(s)	Kaori Sakamoto	Japan	224.90	2	77.23	2	147.67
3rd place, bronze medalist(s)	Ami Nakai	Japan	219.16	1	78.71	9	140.45
4	Mone Chiba	Japan	217.88	4	74.00	4	143.88
5	Amber Glenn	United States	214.91	13	67.39	3	147.52
6	Adeliia Petrosian	Individual Neutral Athletes	214.53	5	72.89	5	141.64
7	Niina Petrõkina	Estonia	210.82	10	69.63	6	141.19
8	Lee Hae-in	South Korea	210.56	9	70.07	8	140.49
9	Anastasiia Gubanova	Georgia	209.99	6	71.77	11	138.22
10	Sofia Samodelkina	Kazakhstan	207.46	12	68.47	10	138.99
11	Shin Ji-a	South Korea	206.68	14	65.66	7	141.02
12	Isabeau Levito	United States	202.80	8	70.84	13	131.96
13	Nina Pinzarrone	Belgium	200.30	11	68.97	14	131.33
14	Loena Hendrickx	Belgium	199.65	7	70.93	15	128.72
15	Lara Naki Gutmann	Italy	195.75	18	61.56	12	134.19
16	Iida Karhunen	Finland	192.79	15	65.06	17	127.73
17	Julia Sauter	Romania	190.93	16	63.13	16	127.80
18	Olga Mikutina	Austria	185.59	17	61.72	18	123.87
19	Zhang Ruiyang	China	178.03	20	59.38	19	118.65
20	Ekaterina Kurakova	Poland	173.37	19	60.14	21	113.23
21	Livia Kaiser	Switzerland	171.52	23	55.69	20	115.83
22	Lorine Schild	France	167.08	24	55.63	22	111.45
23	Kimmy Repond	Switzerland	159.54	21	59.20	23	100.34
24	Mariia Seniuk	Israel	152.61	22	58.61	24	94.00
25	Madeline Schizas	Canada	55.38	25	55.38	Did not advance to free skate	
26	Viktoriia Safonova	Individual Neutral Athletes	54.57	26	54.57	Did not advance to free skate	
27	Meda Variakojytė	Lithuania	53.86	27	53.86	Did not advance to free skate	
28	Alexandra Feigin	Bulgaria	53.42	28	53.42	Did not advance to free skate	
29	Kristen Spours	Great Britain	45.54	29	45.54	Did not advance to free skate	

== Works cited ==
- "Special Regulations & Technical Rules – Single & Pair Skating and Ice Dance 2024" (PDF). International Skating Union. Archived (PDF) from the original on 3 June 2025.
