= Beata Handra =

American ice dancer

Personal information
- Born: January 3, 1977 (age 49) San Francisco, California, U.S.
- Height: 5 ft 3 in (1.60 m)

Figure skating career
- Country: United States
- Partner: Charles Sinek
- Skating club: St. Moritz ISC
- Began skating: 1983
- Retired: 2002

Beata Handra (born January 3, 1977) is an American former competitive ice dancer. With partner and husband Charles Sinek, she is the 1999–2002 U.S. national pewter medalist and placed as high as fourth at the Four Continents Championships.

== Personal life ==
Handra's father is a refugee from the Hungarian revolution in 1956 and her mother is a concert pianist from Japan. She attended the University of California at Berkeley before deciding to focus on skating. Handra and Sinek married in 1996. They have a son and a daughter.

== Career ==
Handra completed her senior test in 1991 with skating coaches Suzy Jackson and Paul Spruell when she lived in San Rafael, California. She skated as a solo dancer early in her career and came to the 1995 National Championships looking for a dance partner. Handra teamed up with Charles Sinek when she was 18 years old. In 2000, Handra/Sinek were given their first Grand Prix assignment, Skate America. Three weeks before the event, Sinek developed a staph infection after Handra accidentally cut his right shin in practice. He recovered and they competed at the event, placing sixth.

In the 2001–02 season, Handra/Sinek missed their two Grand Prix assignments due to health issues—in August 2001, Sinek underwent knee surgery which resulted in a blood clot in his calf, and tore his meniscus a second time in September 2001.

Handra/Sinek placed fourth at the 2002 U.S. Championships and were sent to the 2002 Four Continents Championships where they placed a career-best fourth. They were also granted the United States' second spot to the 2002 Winter Olympics because two teams who ranked above them nationally—Tanith Belbin / Benjamin Agosto and Melissa Gregory / Denis Petukhov—were ineligible for the Olympics due to citizenship problems. Handra/Sinek placed 23rd at the Olympics.

== Programs ==
(with Sinek)

Season	Original dance	Free dance
2001–2002	El Nino Dios by A. Fernandez Diaz, Paco de Lucia; Fugata by Astor Piazzolla	Samson and Delilah by Camille Saint-Saëns performed by the Philadelphia Orchestra
2000–2001	Happy Feet by Paolo Conte; Botch-A-Me by Luigi Astore, Riccardo Morbell, E. Stanley	Migra by Carlos Santana; Revelations by Santana and T. Coster

== Competitive highlights ==
(with Sinek)

International
Event	96–97	97–98	98–99	99–00	00–01	01–02
Winter Olympics						23rd
Four Continents				5th	6th	4th
GP Skate America					6th	
GP Skate Canada					7th	
National
U.S. Championships	10th	8th	4th	4th	4th	4th
GP = Grand Prix
