= Charles Sinek =

American former competitive ice dancer (born 1968)

Personal information
- Born: December 28, 1968 (age 57) Wilmington, North Carolina, U.S.
- Height: 5 ft 9 in (1.75 m)

Figure skating career
- Country: United States
- Partner: Beata Handra
- Skating club: SC of New York
- Began skating: 1977
- Retired: 2002

Charles Sinek (born December 28, 1968) is an American former competitive ice dancer. With partner and wife Beata Handra, he is the 1999–2002 U.S. national pewter medalist and placed as high as fourth at the Four Continents Championships.

== Personal life ==
Sinek was born on December 28, 1968, in Wilmington, North Carolina. His father, Joachim Sinek, represented Chile at the Olympic Games in the 1950s in fencing.

Charles Sinek and Beata Handra were married in 1996. Their son, Kai Bela Sinek, was born on May 11, 2017.

== Career ==
Charles Sinek originally skated with his sister, Anne Sinek, for several years. After his sister retired, he skated with Regina Woodward at the senior level and then turned professional.

Sinek competed at the 1994 Gay Games as a last minute replacement partner for Stephane Vachon, a friend whose partner was unable to compete due to illness. Sinek volunteered to skate with Vachon because he already knew the dance. They won the gold medal in the Male/Male Compulsory Dance 4 competition.

Sinek reinstated as an amateur in 1995. He teamed up with 18-year-old Beata Handra. In 2000, Handra/Sinek were given their first Grand Prix assignment, Skate America. Three weeks before the event, Sinek developed a staph infection after Handra accidentally cut his right shin in practice. He recovered and they competed at the event, placing sixth.

In the 2001–02 season, Handra/Sinek missed their two Grand Prix assignments due to health issues—in August 2001, Sinek underwent knee surgery which resulted in a blood clot in his calf, and tore his meniscus a second time in September 2001.

Handra/Sinek placed fourth at the 2002 U.S. Championships and were sent to the 2002 Four Continents Championships where they placed a career-best fourth. They were also granted the United States' second spot to the 2002 Winter Olympics because two teams who ranked above them nationally—Tanith Belbin / Benjamin Agosto and Melissa Gregory / Denis Petukhov—were ineligible for the Olympics due to citizenship problems. Handra/Sinek placed 23rd at the Olympics.

== Programs ==
(with Handra)

Season	Original dance	Free dance
2001–2002	El Nino Dios by A. Fernandez Diaz, Paco de Lucia; Fugata by Astor Piazzolla	Samson and Delilah by Camille Saint-Saëns performed by the Philadelphia Orchestra
2000–2001	Happy Feet by Paolo Conte; Botch-A-Me by Luigi Astore, Riccardo Morbell, E. Stanley	Migra by Carlos Santana; Revelations by Santana and T. Coster

== Competitive highlights ==
=== With Beata Handra ===
International
Event	96–97	97–98	98–99	99–00	00–01	01–02
Winter Olympics						23rd
Four Continents				5th	6th	4th
GP Skate America					6th	
GP Skate Canada					7th	
National
U.S. Championships	10th	8th	4th	4th	4th	4th
GP = Grand Prix

=== With Regina Woodward ===
Event	1989
U.S. Championships	11th
