= Mei Okada (figure skater) =

Japanese figure skater (born 2010)

- Okada at the 2026 JGP in Riga

Personal information
- Native name: 岡田 芽依
- Born: April 22, 2010 (age 16) Nagoya, Aichi Prefecture, Japan
- Height: 1.52 m (5 ft 0 in)

Figure skating career
- Country: Japan
- Coach: Mie Hamada
- Skating club: Kinoshita Academy
- Began skating: 2015
Medal record
Figure skating: Women's singles
Junior Grand Prix Final
Bronze medal – third place	2025–26 Nagoya	Women's singles

Mei Okada (岡田 芽依, Okada Mei; born April 22, 2010) is a Japanese figure skater. She is the 2025 Junior Grand Prix Final bronze medalist, a six-time Junior Grand Prix series medalist, and the 2025–26 Japan junior bronze medalist.

== Personal life ==
Mei Okada was born on April 22, 2010 in Nagoya, Aichi Prefecture, Japan. Around 2019, she and her family moved to Nishio but despite that, Okada continued making the two-hour trip to Nagoya for her training until 2026 when she moved to Uji, Kyoto.

She is named after the character, Mei Kusakabe, from My Neighbor Totoro. In reference to that, Okada often carries a Totoro tissue box with her to competitions.

Her figure skating idols are Mao Asada and her former training mate, Miyabi Oba. As hobbies, she enjoys cooking and nail art.

In 2026, Okada enrolled at Chukyo University Chukyo High School.

== Career ==
=== Early years ===
Okada began learning how to skate in 2015 at the age of five at the encouragement of her mother, who was a fan of Mao Asada. She subsequently began training at the Meito Figure Skating Club under coaches, Yuko Monna, Rina Horie, and Haruka Oshima.

She made her junior national debut at the 2023–24 Japan Junior Championships.

=== 2024–25 season: Junior international debut ===
Okada started her season by making her junior international debut on the Junior Grand Prix series, winning bronze at 2024 JGP Thailand and at 2024 JGP Slovenia. With these results, Okada was named as the second alternate for the 2024–25 Junior Grand Prix Final.

In November, Okada competed at the 2024–25 Japan Junior Championships. She placed twenty-first in the short program but rebounded with a third-place free skate to move up to eighth place overall. With this result, Okada was invited to compete at the senior national championships the following month, where she placed eighteenth overall.

=== 2025–26 season: Junior Grand Prix Final bronze ===
Okada began her season by competing Junior Grand Prix circuit, winning gold at 2025 JGP Latvia. "I was third place twice last year [on the Junior Grand Prix]," she stated in an interview following this result. "So this season I have set my goal as going to the [Junior Grand Prix] Final. And especially because it's going to be in my hometown so that gives me extra motivation." Okada then went on to win the silver medal at 2025 JGP Thailand behind teammate, Mao Shimada.

Okada's results on the Junior Grand Prix series allowed her to qualify for the 2025–26 Junior Grand Prix Final in her hometown of Nagoya, Japan.

In November, Okada competed at the 2025–26 Japan Junior Championships where she won the bronze medal behind Mao Shimada and Mayuko Oka. With this result, Okada was invited to compete at the senior national championships.

The week after, Okada competed at the 2025–26 Junior Grand Prix Final where she placed second in the short program and fifth in the free skate to win the bronze medal overall behind Mao Shimada and Kim Yu-seong. During her free skate, Okada attempted a triple Axel for the first time in international competition but she fell on it and it marked as under-rotated.

Moving up to the senior level to compete at the 2025–26 Japan Championships at the end of December, Okada finished the event in fourteenth place.

Selected to compete at the 2026 World Junior Championships in Tallinn, Estonia, Okada placed a disappointing twenty-fourth in the short program after her triple loop was deemed as landed on the quarter, popping the first part of her planned triple flip-triple toe combination into a single, and falling on the second part of that combination. She rebounded with a stronger free skate, however, placing fifth in that competition segment and moving up to tenth place overall.

In April, it was announced that Okada had transferred to the Kinoshita Academy in Uji, Kyoto, where she would be coached by Mie Hamada.

=== 2026–27 season ===
Okada opened her season by winning the silver medal at Kinoshita Summer Cup. She subsequently won silver at the Junior Grand Prix in Latvia, setting new ISU personal best scores in both program segments and overall.

Okada continued this momentum by winning gold at the JGP in Turkey. Her gold and silver medal results led her to qualify for the Junior Grand Prix Final.

== Programs ==
Season	Short program	Free skating	Exhibition
2026–2027	Hernando's Hideaway (from The Pajama Game) by Richard Adler & Jerry Ross performed by Roger Williams, Robert Bentley, & The Romantic Strings and Orchestra; Milonga de mis amores by Pedro Laurenz performed by SEXTETO VISCERAL choreo. by Kana Muramoto	The Phantom of the Opera by Andrew Lloyd Webber; Wishing You Were Somehow Here Again performed by Emmy Rossum; Masquerade performed by Cast of "The Phantom of the Opera" Motion Picture; The Phantom of the Opera performed by Gerard Butler & Emmy Rossum choreo. by Kaitlyn Weaver	
2025–2026	Space Table Symphony by Bernd Breiter ft. David Garrett & Frankfurt Radio Symphony choreo. by Kenji Miyamoto	Miss Saigon by Claude-Michel Schönberg; Overture - The Movie In My Mind - The Fall of Saigon - This Is the Hour performed by Minoru Otaki & Saitama Sakae Wind Orchestra; I Still Believe performed by Eva Noblezada & Tamsin Carroll choreo. by Kenji Miyamoto	Nine by Maury Yeston; Unusual Way performed by Nicole Kidman; Be Italian performed by Fergie choreo. by Kenji Miyamoto
2024–2025	Nine by Maury Yeston; Unusual Way performed by Nicole Kidman; Be Italian performed by Fergie choreo. by Kenji Miyamoto	Maleficent; Season of the Witch (from Maleficent: Mistress of Evil) by Audiomachine ft. MOLLY; Prince Phillip; The Queen of Faerieland (from Maleficent) by James Newton Howard; You Can't Stop the Girl (from Maleficent: Mistress of Evil) by Bebe Rexha choreo. by Utako Wakamatsu	
2023–2024	Baby Face by Harry Akst choreo. by Utako Wakamatsu	Maleficent; Season of the Witch (from Maleficent: Mistress of Evil) by Audiomachine ft. MOLLY; Prince Phillip; The Queen of Faerieland (from Maleficent) by James Newton Howard; You Can't Stop the Girl (from Maleficent: Mistress of Evil) by Bebe Rexha choreo. by Utako Wakamatsu	

== Competitive highlights ==
- JGP – Event of the ISU Junior Grand Prix
- TBD – Assigned

Competition placements at senior level
Season	2024–25	2025–26
Japan Championships	18th	14th

Competition placements at junior level
Season	2023–24	2024–25	2025–26	2026–27
World Junior Championships			10th	
Japan Championships	14th	8th	3rd	1st
JGP Final			3rd	TBD
JGP Latvia			1st	2nd
JGP Slovenia		3rd		
JGP Thailand		3rd	2nd	
JGP Turkey				1st

== Detailed results ==
ISU personal best scores in the +5/-5 GOE System
Segment	Type	Score	Event
Total	TSS	205.47	2026 JGP Latvia
Short program	TSS	74.27	2026 JGP Turkey
Short program	TES	44.19	2026 JGP Turkey
Short program	PCS	30.08	2026 JGP Turkey
Free skating	TSS	133.00	2026 JGP Latvia
Free skating	TES	70.39	2026 JGP Latvia
Free skating	PCS	64.19	2026 JGP Turkey

=== Senior level ===
Results in the 2024–25 season
Date	Event	SP		FS		Total	
Date	Event	P	Score	P	Score	P	Score
Dec 19–22, 2024	2024–25 Japan Championships	16	61.28	19	118.48	18	179.76

Results in the 2025–26 season
Date	Event	SP		FS		Total	
Date	Event	P	Score	P	Score	P	Score
Dec 18–21, 2025	2025–26 Japan Championships	18	60.43	12	124.86	14	185.29

=== Junior level ===
Results in the 2023–24 season
Date	Event	SP		FS		Total	
Date	Event	P	Score	P	Score	P	Score
Nov 17–19, 2023	2023–24 Japan Championships (Junior)	16	51.41	14	101.58	14	152.99

Results in the 2024–25 season
Date	Event	SP		FS		Total	
Date	Event	P	Score	P	Score	P	Score
Sep 11–14, 2024	2024 JGP Thailand	3	57.58	4	118.38	3	175.96
Oct 2–5, 2024	2024 JGP Slovenia	2	68.34	3	122.59	3	190.93
Nov 15–17, 2024	2024–25 Japan Championships (Junior)	21	49.72	3	124.79	8	174.51

Results in the 2025–26 season
Date	Event	SP		FS		Total	
Date	Event	P	Score	P	Score	P	Score
Aug 20–23, 2025	2025 JGP Latvia	1	68.38	1	121.29	1	189.67
Sep 9–13, 2025	2025 JGP Thailand	2	65.95	2	125.04	2	190.99
Nov 22–24, 2025	2025–26 Japan Championships (Junior)	2	65.07	3	123.24	3	188.31
Dec 4–7, 2025	(Japan) 2025–26 Junior Grand Prix Final	2	68.21	5	127.61	3	195.82
Mar 3–8, 2026	(Estonia) 2026 World Junior Championships	24	53.70	5	124.07	10	177.77

Results in the 2026–27 season
Date	Event	SP		FS		Total	
Date	Event	P	Score	P	Score	P	Score
Aug 27–29, 2026	2026 JGP Latvia	1	72.47	2	133.00	2	205.47
Sep 17–19, 2026	2026 JGP Turkey	1	74.27	1	132.11	1	206.38
