= 2025–26 Grand Prix of Figure Skating Final =

International figure skating competition

2025–26 Grand Prix Final
- Type: Grand Prix
- Date: December 4 – 7
- Season: 2025–26
- Location: Nagoya, Japan
- Host: Japan Skating Federation
- Venue: Aichi International Arena

Champions
- Men's singles: (United States) Ilia Malinin (Senior) & (South Korea) Seo Min-kyu (Junior)
- Women's singles: (United States) Alysa Liu (Senior) & (Japan) Mao Shimada (Junior)
- Pairs: (Japan) Riku Miura and Ryuichi Kihara (Senior) & (China) Guo Rui and Zhang Yiwen (Junior)
- Ice dance: (United States) Madison Chock and Evan Bates (Senior) & (United States) Hana Maria Aboian and Daniil Veselukhin (Junior)
- Previous: 2024–25 Grand Prix Final
- Next: 2026–27 Grand Prix Final
- Previous Grand Prix: 2025 Finlandia Trophy

The 2025 Grand Prix of Figure Skating Final took place at the Aichi International Arena in Nagoya, Japan.

The 2025–26 Grand Prix of Figure Skating Final and the 2025–26 Junior Grand Prix of Figure Skating Final were figure skating competitions, sanctioned by the International Skating Union (ISU), and organized and hosted by the Japan Skating Federation (Japanese: 日本スケート連盟). The Grand Prix Final was the culminating event of the 2025–26 Grand Prix of Figure Skating series, as was the Junior Grand Prix Final the culmination of the 2025–26 Junior Grand Prix series. Both events were held concurrently from December 4 to 7 at the Aichi International Arena in Nagoya, Japan. Medals were awarded in men's singles, women's singles, pair skating, and ice dance at the junior and senior levels. Ilia Malinin and Alysa Liu of the United States won the senior men's and women's events, respectively. Riku Miura and Ryuichi Kihara of Japan won the senior pairs event, and Madison Chock and Evan Bates of the United States won the senior ice dance event. Seo Min-kyu of South Korea won the junior men's event, Mao Shimada of Japan won the junior women's event, Guo Rui and Zhang Yiwen of China won the junior pairs event, and Hana Maria Aboian and Daniil Veselukhin of the United States won the junior ice dance event.

== Background ==
The ISU Grand Prix of Figure Skating is a series of seven events sanctioned by the International Skating Union (ISU) and held during the autumn: six qualifying events and the Grand Prix of Figure Skating Final. The series allows skaters to perfect their programs earlier in the season and compete against other skaters whom they would later encounter at the World Figure Skating Championships. Skaters earn points based on their results and at the end of the sixth event, the top six skaters or teams in each discipline are invited to compete at the Grand Prix Final. The 2025–26 Grand Prix of Figure Skating consisted of the following events.

2025–26 Grand Prix competitions
Date	Event	Location	Ref.
October 17–19	2025 Grand Prix de France	Angers, France	
October 24–26	2025 Cup of China	Chongqing, China	
October 31 – November 2	2025 Skate Canada International	Saskatoon, Saskatchewan, Canada	
November 7–9	(Japan) 2025 NHK Trophy	Osaka, Japan	
November 14–16	(United States) 2025 Skate America	Lake Placid, New York, United States	
November 21–23	(Finland) 2025 Finlandia Trophy	Helsinki, Finland	

The ISU Junior Grand Prix of Figure Skating (JGP) was established in 1997 and consists of a series of seven international competitions exclusively for junior-level skaters. While all seven competitions feature the men's, women's, and ice dance events, only four competitions each season feature the pairs event.

2025–26 Junior Grand Prix competitions
Date	Event	Location	Notes	Ref.
August 20–23	(Latvia) 2025 JGP Riga	Riga, Latvia	—N/a	
August 27–30	(Turkey) 2025 JGP Ankara	Ankara, Turkey	—N/a	
September 3–6	(Italy) 2025 JGP Varese	Varese, Italy	No pairs	
September 9–13	(Thailand) 2025 JGP Bangkok	Bangkok, Thailand	—N/a	
September 24–27	(Azerbaijan) 2025 JGP Baku	Baku, Azerbaijan	No pairs	
October 1–4	(Poland) 2025 JGP Gdańsk	Gdańsk, Poland	—N/a	
October 8–11	(United Arab Emirates) 2025 JGP Abu Dhabi	Abu Dhabi, United Arab Emirates	No pairs	

The 2025–26 Grand Prix and Junior Grand Prix Finals were held from December 4 to 7 at the Aichi International Arena in Nagoya, Japan.

== Qualifiers ==
The top six skaters or teams in each discipline were determined based on the results of the six qualifying Grand Prix competitions.

=== Senior qualifiers ===
Grand Prix Final qualifiers
No.	Men	Women	Pairs	Ice dance
1	(United States); Ilia Malinin	(Japan); Mone Chiba	(Japan); Riku Miura; Ryuichi Kihara	(United States); Madison Chock; Evan Bates
2	(Japan); Yuma Kagiyama	(Japan); Kaori Sakamoto	(Italy); Sara Conti; Niccolò Macii	(France); Laurence Fournier Beaudry; Guillaume Cizeron
3	(Japan); Shun Sato	(United States); Amber Glenn	(Germany); Minerva Fabienne Hase; Nikita Volodin	(United Kingdom); Lilah Fear; Lewis Gibson
4	(France); Adam Siao Him Fa	(United States); Alysa Liu	(Georgia (country)); Anastasiia Metelkina; Luka Berulava	(Canada); Piper Gilles; Paul Poirier
5	(Kazakhstan); Mikhail Shaidorov	(Japan); Ami Nakai	(Canada); Deanna Stellato-Dudek; Maxime Deschamps	(Lithuania); Allison Reed; Saulius Ambrulevičius
6	(Italy); Daniel Grassl	(Japan); Rinka Watanabe	(Hungary); Maria Pavlova; Alexei Sviatchenko	(United States); Emilea Zingas; Vadym Kolesnik

Grand Prix Final alternates
No.	Men	Women	Pairs	Ice dance
1	(Japan); Kazuki Tomono	(United States); Isabeau Levito	(China); Sui Wenjing; Han Cong	(Canada); Marjorie Lajoie; Zachary Lagha
2	(Switzerland); Lukas Britschgi	(Georgia (country)); Anastasiia Gubanova	(United States); Ellie Kam; Daniel O'Shea	(Italy); Charlène Guignard; Marco Fabbri
3	(Georgia (country)); Nika Egadze	(United States); Bradie Tennell	(United States); Alisa Efimova; Misha Mitrofanov	(France); Evgeniia Lopareva; Geoffrey Brissaud

=== Junior qualifiers ===
The top six skaters or teams in each discipline were determined based on the results of the seven qualifying Junior Grand Prix competitions.

Junior Grand Prix Final qualifiers
No.	Men	Women	Pairs	Ice dance
1	(Japan); Rio Nakata	(Japan); Mao Shimada	(Canada); Ava Kemp; Yohnathan Elizarov	(United States); Hana Maria Aboian; Daniil Veselukhin
2	(South Korea); Seo Min-kyu	(South Korea); Kim Yu-jae	(China); Zhang Xuanqi; Feng Wenqiang	(Ukraine); Iryna Pidgaina; Artem Koval
3	(South Korea); Choi Ha-bin	(Japan); Mayuko Oka	(China); Guo Rui; Zhang Yiwen	(Canada); Layla Veillon; Alexander Brandys
4	(Japan); Taiga Nishino	(Japan); Mei Okada	(Canada); Jazmine Desrochers; Kieran Thrasher	(France); Ambre Perrier Gianesini; Samuel Blanc Klaperman
5	(United States); Lucius Kazanecki	(Japan); Sumika Kanazawa	(Canada); Julia Quattrocchi; Étienne Lacasse	(United States); Jasmine Robertson; Chase Rohner
6	(Belgium); Denis Krouglov	(South Korea); Kim Yu-seong	(China); Chen Yuxuan; Dong Yinbo	(France); Dania Mouaden; Théo Bigot

Junior Grand Prix Final alternates
No.	Men	Women	Pairs	Ice dance
1	(Japan); Sena Takahashi	(Australia); Hana Bath	(United States); Naomi Williams; Lachlan Lewer	(Canada); Charlie Anderson; Cayden Dawson
2	(United States); Patrick Blackwell	(South Korea); Youn Seo-jin	(United States); Reagan Moss; Jakub Galbuvy	(Italy); Zoe Bianchi; Daniel Basile
3	(Germany); Genrikh Gartung	(United States); Sophie Joline von Felten	(United States); Sofia Jarmoc; Luke Witkowski	(Canada); Summer Homick; Nicholas Buelow

== Required performance elements ==
=== Single skating ===
Men and women competing in single skating first performed a short program. Junior men and women performed their short programs on December 4. Senior men performed their short programs on December 4, while senior women performed theirs on December 5. Lasting 2 minutes 40 seconds (+/− 10 seconds), the short program had to include the following elements:

For junior men: one double or triple Axel; one double or triple loop; one jump combination consisting of a double jump and a triple jump or two triple jumps; one flying sit spin; one camel spin with a change of foot; one spin combination with a change of foot; and a step sequence using the full ice surface.

For senior men: one double or triple Axel; one triple or quadruple jump; one jump combination consisting of a double jump and a triple jump, two triple jumps, or a quadruple jump and a double jump or triple jump; one flying spin; one camel spin or sit spin with a change of foot; one spin combination with a change of foot; and a step sequence using the full ice surface.

For junior women: one double Axel; one double or triple loop; one jump combination consisting of two double jumps, one double jump and one triple jump, or two triple jumps; one flying sit spin; one layback spin, sideways leaning spin, or camel spin without a change of foot; one spin combination with a change of foot; and one step sequence using the full ice surface.

For senior women: one double or triple Axel; one triple jump; one jump combination consisting of a double jump and a triple jump, or two triple jumps; one flying spin; one layback spin, sideways leaning spin, camel spin, or sit spin without a change of foot; one spin combination with a change of foot; and one step sequence using the full ice surface.

Junior men and women performed their free skates on December 5, while senior men and women performed theirs on December 6. Lasting 3 minutes 30 seconds (+/− 10 seconds) for junior skaters, or 4 minutes (+/− 10 seconds) for senior skaters,the free skate had to include the following:

For junior men and women: seven jump elements, of which one had to be an Axel-type jump; three spins, of which one had to be a spin combination, one a flying spin, and one a spin with only one position; and a choreographic sequence.

For senior men and women: seven jump elements, of which one had to be an Axel-type jump; three spins, of which one had to be a spin combination, one a flying spin, and one a spin with only one position; a step sequence; and a choreographic sequence.

=== Pairs ===
Junior and senior couples competing in pair skating performed their short programs on December 4. Lasting 2 minutes 40 seconds (+/− 10 seconds), the short program had to include the following elements:

For junior couples: one pair lift, one double or triple twist lift, one double or triple toe loop or flip/Lutz throw jump, one double loop or double Axel solo jump, one solo spin combination with a change of foot, one death spiral, and a step sequence using the full ice surface.

For senior couples: one pair lift, one double or triple twist lift, one double or triple throw jump, one double or triple solo jump, one solo spin combination with a change of foot, one death spiral, and a step sequence using the full ice surface.

Senior couples performed their free skates on December 5, while junior couples performed theirs on December 6. Lasting 3 minutes 30 seconds (+/− 10 seconds) for junior couples, or 4 minutes (+/− 10 seconds) for senior couples, the free skate had to include the following:

For junior couples: two pair lifts, one twist lift, two different throw jumps, one solo jump, one jump combination or sequence, one pair spin combination, one death spiral, and a choreographic sequence.

For senior couples: three pair lifts, one twist lift, two different throw jumps, one solo jump, one jump combination or sequence, one pair spin combination, one death spiral, and a choreographic sequence.

=== Ice dance ===
Senior couples competing in ice dance performed their rhythm dances on December 4, while junior couples performed theirs on December 5. Lasting 2 minutes 50 seconds (+/− 10 seconds), the theme of the rhythm dance this season was "music, dance styles, and feeling of the 1990s". Examples of applicable dance styles and music included pop, Latin, house, techno, hip-hop, and grunge. The rhythm dance had to include the following elements:

For junior couples: one sequence of the rhumba followed immediately by one sequence of the quickstep, one dance lift, one set of sequential twizzles, and one step sequence while not in hold.

For senior couples: one pattern dance step sequence, one choreographic rhythm sequence, one dance lift, one set of sequential twizzles, and one step sequence while not in hold.

All couples performed their free dances on December 6. Lasting 3 minutes 30 seconds (+/− 10 seconds) for juniors, or 4 minutes (+/− 10 seconds) for seniors, the free dance had to include the following:

For junior couples: two dance lifts or one combination lift; one dance spin; one set of synchronized twizzles; one step sequence in hold, one turns sequence while on one skate and not in hold; and two choreographic elements.

For senior couples: three dance lifts or one short lift and one combination lift; one dance spin; one set of synchronized twizzles; one step sequence in hold; one step sequence while on one skate and not in hold, and three choreographic elements.

== Judging ==
Skaters were judged according to the required technical elements of their program (such as jumps and spins), as well as the overall presentation of their program, based on three program components (skating skills, presentation, and composition). Each technical element in a figure skating performance was assigned a predetermined base point value and scored by a panel of nine judges on a scale from −5 to +5 based on the quality of its execution. Each Grade of Execution (GOE) from –5 to +5 was assigned a value as indicated on the Scale of Values. For example, a triple Axel was worth a base value of 8.00 points, and a GOE of +3 was worth 2.40 points, so a triple Axel with a GOE of +3 earned 10.40 points. The judging panel's GOE for each element was determined by calculating the trimmed mean (the average after discarding the highest and lowest scores). The panel's scores for all elements were added together to generate a Total Elements Score. At the same time, the judges evaluated each performance based on the five aforementioned program components and assigned each a score from 0.25 to 10 in 0.25-point increments. The judging panel's final score for each program component was also determined by calculating the trimmed mean. Those scores were then multiplied by the factor shown on the chart below; the results were added together to generate a total Program Component Score.

Program component factoring
Discipline	Short program or Rhythm dance	Free skate or Free dance
Men	1.67	3.33
Women	1.33	2.67
Pairs	1.33	2.67
Ice dance	1.33	2.00

Deductions were applied for certain violations, such as time infractions or falls. The Total Elements Score and Program Component Score were then added together, minus any deductions, to generate a final performance score for each skater or team.

== Medal summary ==
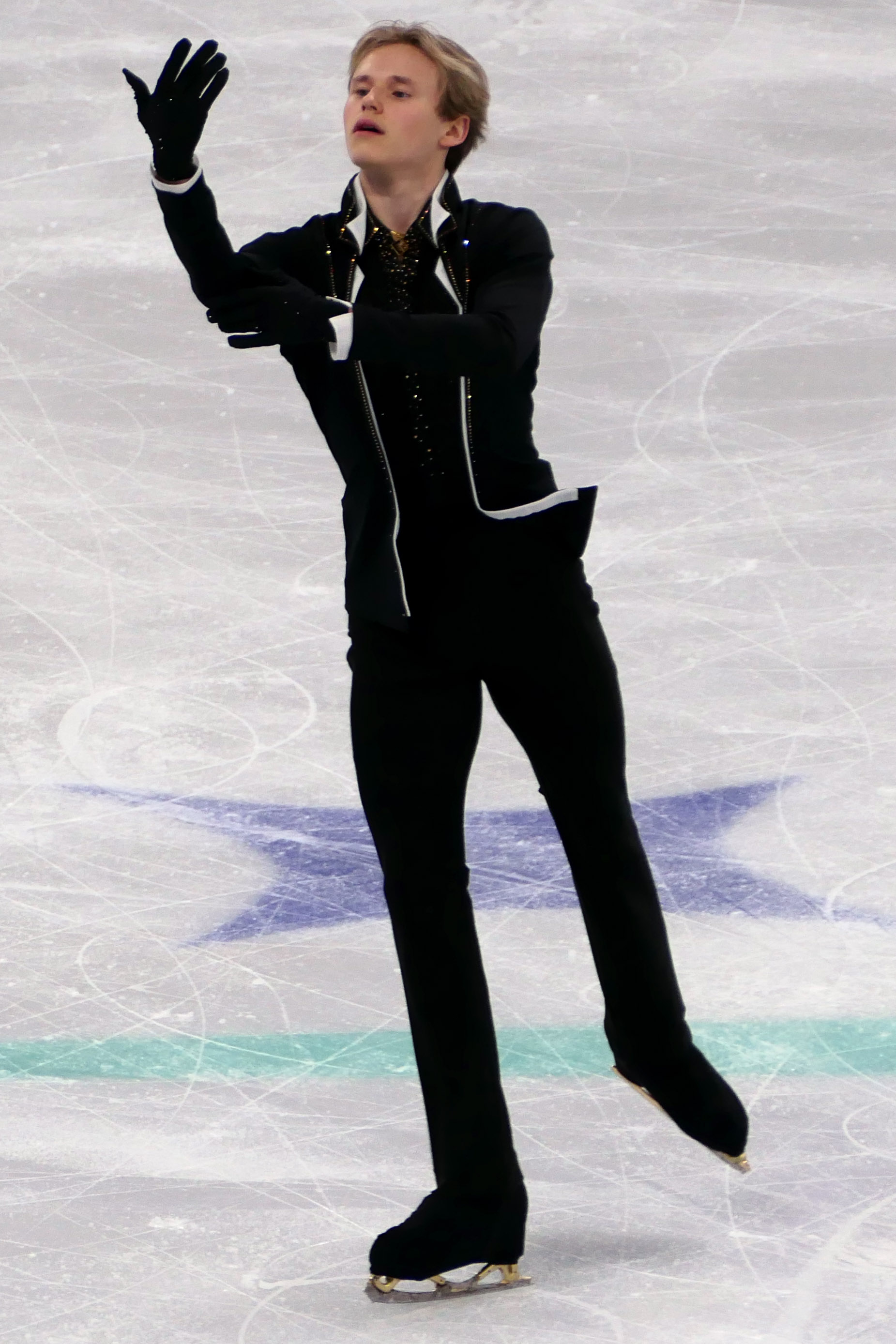
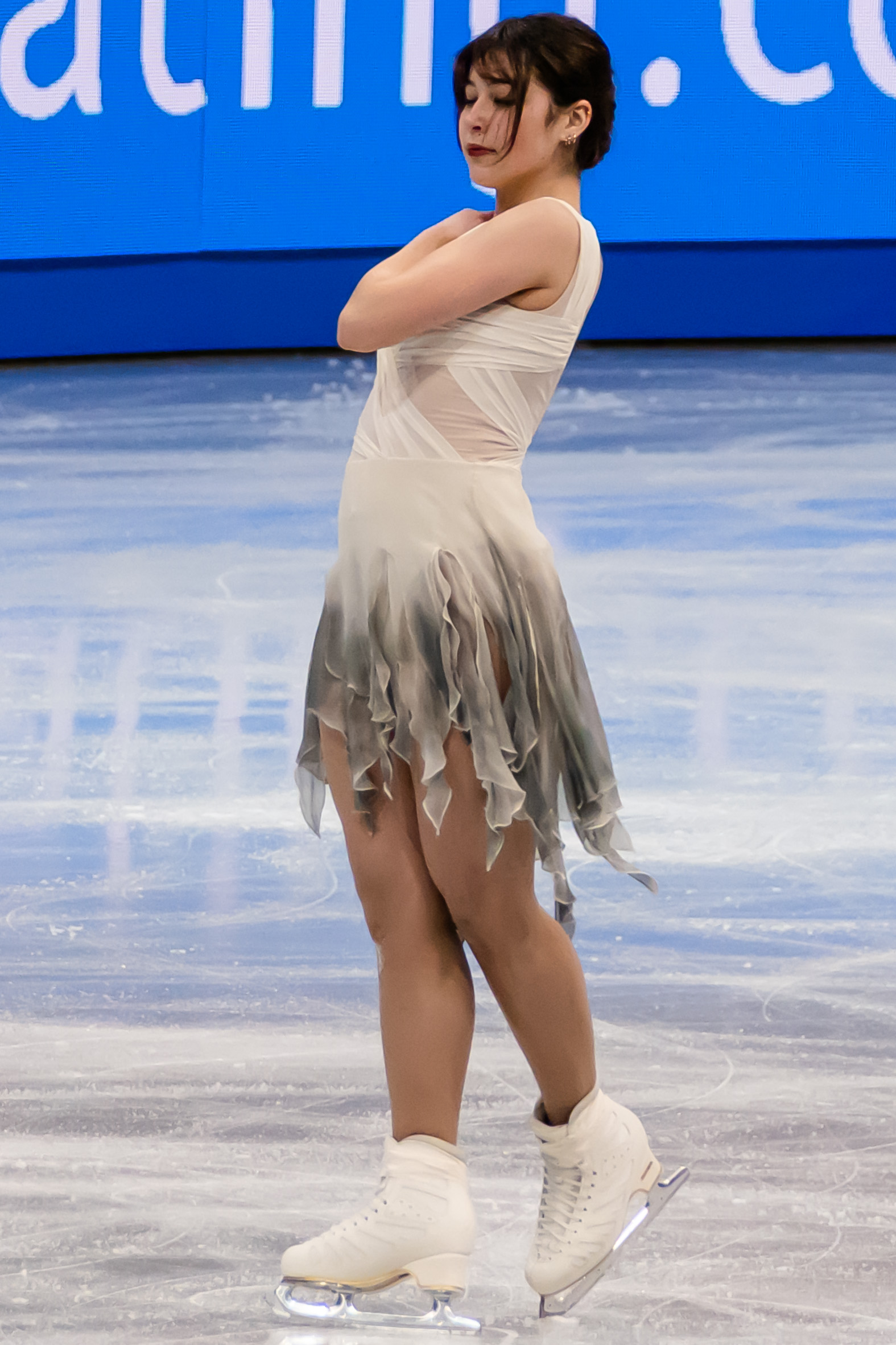
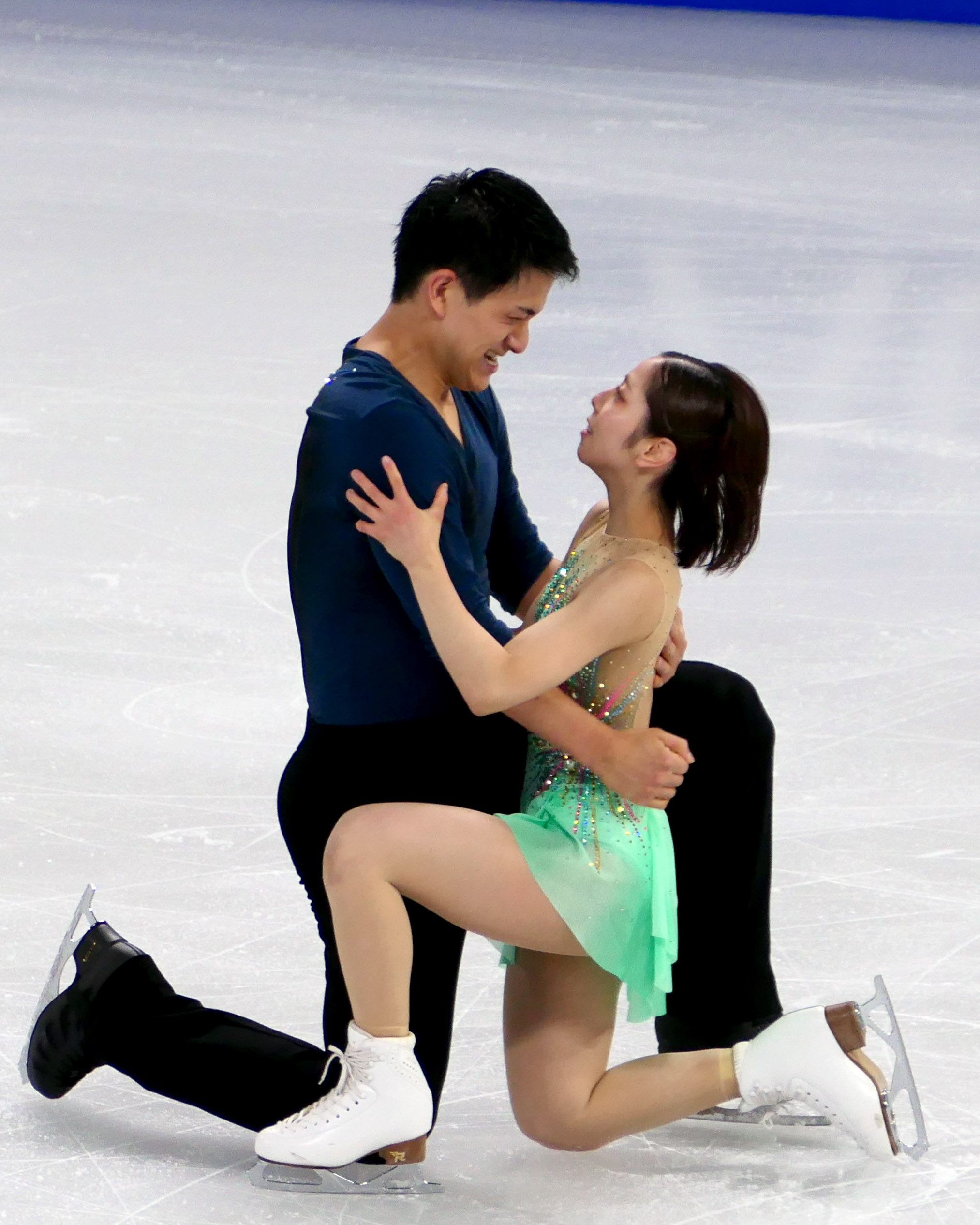
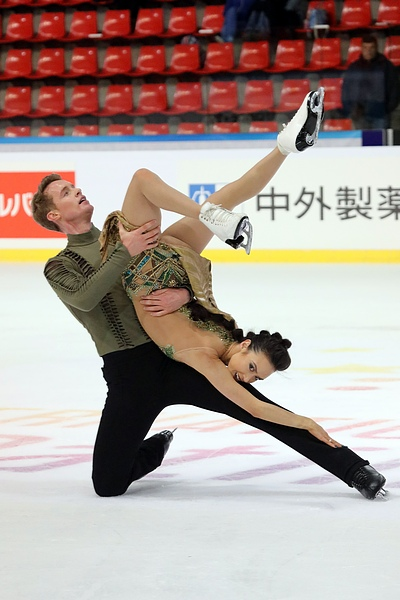
From left to right: The 2025 Grand Prix Final champions: Ilia Malinin of the United States (men's singles); Alysa Liu of the United States (women's singles); Riku Miura and Ryuichi Kihara of Japan (pair skating); and Madison Chock and Evan Bates of the United States (ice dance)

=== Senior medalists ===
Grand Prix Final medalists
Discipline	Gold	Silver	Bronze
Men	(United States); Ilia Malinin	(Japan); Yuma Kagiyama	(Japan); Shun Sato
Women	(United States); Alysa Liu	(Japan); Ami Nakai	(Japan); Kaori Sakamoto
Pairs	(Japan); Riku Miura; Ryuichi Kihara	(Italy); Sara Conti; Niccolò Macii	(Germany); Minerva Fabienne Hase; Nikita Volodin
Ice dance	(United States); Madison Chock; Evan Bates	(France); Laurence Fournier Beaudry; Guillaume Cizeron	(United Kingdom); Lilah Fear; Lewis Gibson

=== Junior medalists ===
Junior Grand Prix Final medalists
Discipline	Gold	Silver	Bronze
Men	(South Korea); Seo Min-kyu	(Japan); Rio Nakata	(United States); Lucius Kazanecki
Women	(Japan); Mao Shimada	(South Korea); Kim Yu-seong	(Japan); Mei Okada
Pairs	(China); Guo Rui; Zhang Yiwen	(China); Zhang Xuanqi; Feng Wenqiang	(Canada); Ava Kemp; Yohnathan Elizarov
Ice dance	(United States); Hana Maria Aboian; Daniil Veselukhin	(France); Ambre Perrier Gianesini; Samuel Blanc Klaperman	(Ukraine); Iryna Pidgaina; Artem Koval

=== Medals table ===
==== Senior ====
Rank	Nation	Gold	Silver	Bronze	Total
1	United States	3	0	0	3
2	Japan	1	2	2	5
3	France	0	1	0	1
3	Italy	0	1	0	1
5	Germany	0	0	1	1
5	Great Britain	0	0	1	1
Totals (6 entries)		4	4	4	12

==== Junior ====
Rank	Nation	Gold	Silver	Bronze	Total
1	Japan	1	1	1	3
2	China	1	1	0	2
2	South Korea	1	1	0	2
4	United States	1	0	1	2
5	France	0	1	0	1
6	Canada	0	0	1	1
6	Ukraine	0	0	1	1
Totals (7 entries)		4	4	4	12

== Senior results ==
=== Men's singles ===
Ilia Malinin of the United States made an uncharacteristic error while attempting a quadruple Axel-triple toe loop jump combination, finishing in third place after the short program. "I just wanted to try this [combination] out," Malinin said afterward. “It was the first time in a competition and it didn’t work out, so I had to just continue with the program." This allowed Yuma Kagiyama of Japan to finish in first place, while Shun Sato, also of Japan, finished second. Kagiyama set a new season-best score in the short program, successfully performing a quadruple toe loop-triple toe loop combination, a quadruple Salchow, and a triple Axel. "I went in with the mindset that I am the best and it really helped," Kagiyama said. "It felt like the Beijing Olympics." Kagiyama had won the silver medal at the 2022 Winter Olympics.

Malinin rebounded in the free skate, setting a new world record and becoming the first skater to successfully perform seven quadruple jumps in competition. He performed all six figure skating jumps – toe loop, Salchow, loop, flip, Lutz, and Axel – plus an extra Lutz, as quadruples. His free skate score of 238.24 was a new world record; the previous record was set by Malinin one month earlier at the 2025 Skate Canada International. "I’m really satisfied with my performance and I know that I’m able to get these jumps under pressure and now that I’m able to figure that out, I can add a lot more to the program to really make it one piece," Malinin stated afterward. His total score was nearly thirty points higher than silver medalist Yuma Kagiyama. Shun Sato finished in third place. Figure skating commentator Philip Hersh described Malinin: "Everyone should revel in watching a generational talent, one who is taking full advantage of the way the sport is scored and judged today, one who has leapt past presumed athletic barriers. Malinin is sui generis, one of a kind."

Senior men's results
Rank	Skater	Nation	Total points	SP		FS	
1st place, gold medalist(s)	Ilia Malinin	United States	332.29	3	94.05	1	238.24
2nd place, silver medalist(s)	Yuma Kagiyama	Japan	302.41	1	108.77	4	193.64
3rd place, bronze medalist(s)	Shun Sato	Japan	292.08	2	98.06	3	194.02
4	Daniel Grassl	Italy	288.72	4	94.00	2	194.72
5	Adam Siao Him Fa	France	258.64	5	78.49	5	180.15
6	Mikhail Shaidorov	Kazakhstan	242.19	6	71.30	6	170.89

=== Women's singles ===
Alysa Liu of the United States set a new season-best score to win the women's event. Fewer than two points separated Liu from Ami Nakai of Japan, who finished in second place. Kaori Sakamoto, also of Japan, rallied back from a fifth place finish in the short program, scoring the highest free skate of the evening to ultimately finish in third place. Mone Chiba, also of Japan, had been in first place after the short program, but ultimately finished in fifth place after numerous errors in her free skate. "I’m still not sure of how I feel at the moment but today I felt weak like I never have before," Chiba stated afterward. "This is the worst humiliation I’ve felt all season. I betrayed myself and that’s incredibly disappointing and sad."

Senior women's results
Rank	Skater	Nation	Total points	SP		FS	
1st place, gold medalist(s)	Alysa Liu	United States	222.49	2	75.79	3	146.70
2nd place, silver medalist(s)	Ami Nakai	Japan	220.89	3	73.91	2	146.98
3rd place, bronze medalist(s)	Kaori Sakamoto	Japan	218.80	5	69.40	1	149.40
4	Amber Glenn	United States	211.50	6	66.85	4	144.65
5	Mone Chiba	Japan	210.22	1	77.27	6	132.95
6	Rinka Watanabe	Japan	207.14	4	70.68	5	136.46

=== Pairs ===
Riku Miura and Ryuichi Kihara finished in first place, narrowly beating out Sara Conti and Niccolò Macii of Italy, and Minerva Fabienne Hase and Nikita Volodin of Germany, who finished second and third, respectively. Kihara was from the Nagoya area, which he said helped give him and Miura an emotional boost. "We wouldn’t have been able to finish the skate the way we did without the crowd getting behind us," Miura said. "We owe it to those who have supported us from the beginning of our partnership." Conti and Macii scored new personal-best scores in both the short program and free skate, successfully landing all of their jumps and finishing in second place. Hase and Volodin, the reigning Grand Prix Final champions, had an error-ridden short program, which left them in fifth place, but rallied back to finish first in the free skate, ultimately finishing the competition in third place. "We were hoping the whole season for a free program like that," Hase explained. "Today was the first time everyone saw our intention and I think we can still do better in a lot of things, but it was a great start."

Senior pairs' results
Rank	Team	Nation	Total points	SP		FS	
1st place, gold medalist(s)	Riku Miura; Ryuichi Kihara	Japan	225.21	1	77.32	2	147.89
2nd place, silver medalist(s)	Sara Conti; Niccolò Macii	Italy	223.28	2	77.22	3	146.06
3rd place, bronze medalist(s)	Minerva Fabienne Hase; Nikita Volodin	Germany	221.25	5	71.68	1	149.57
4	Anastasiia Metelkina; Luka Berulava	Georgia	211.53	3	75.04	4	136.49
5	Maria Pavlova; Alexei Sviatchenko	Hungary	208.33	4	72.84	5	135.49
6	Deanna Stellato-Dudek; Maxime Deschamps	Canada	194.36	6	71.07	6	123.29

=== Ice dance ===
In their first match-up with Laurence Fournier Beaudry and Guillaume Cizeron of France, Madison Chock and Evan Bates emerged victorious, setting new season best scores in both the rhythm dance and free dance in the process. Fournier Beaudry and Cizeron received two deductions during their rhythm dance and ultimately finished six points behind Chock and Bates. It was the first time that the two teams had competed against each other this season. Lilah Fear and Lewis Gibson of Great Britain finished in third place. She and Gibson had been in fourth place behind Piper Gilles and Paul Poirier of Canada after the rhythm dance, separated by less than one point, but were able to make up the difference during the free dance to ultimately finish third.

Senior ice dance results
Rank	Team	Nation	Total points	RD		FD	
1st place, gold medalist(s)	Madison Chock; Evan Bates	United States	220.42	1	88.74	1	131.68
2nd place, silver medalist(s)	Laurence Fournier Beaudry; Guillaume Cizeron	France	214.25	2	87.56	2	126.69
3rd place, bronze medalist(s)	Lilah Fear; Lewis Gibson	Great Britain	208.81	4	82.55	3	126.26
4	Piper Gilles; Paul Poirier	Canada	208.75	3	82.89	4	125.86
5	Allison Reed; Saulius Ambrulevicius	Lithuania	199.61	5	79.48	5	120.13
6	Emilea Zingas; Vadym Kolesnik	United States	193.61	6	75.78	6	117.83

== Junior results ==
=== Men's singles ===
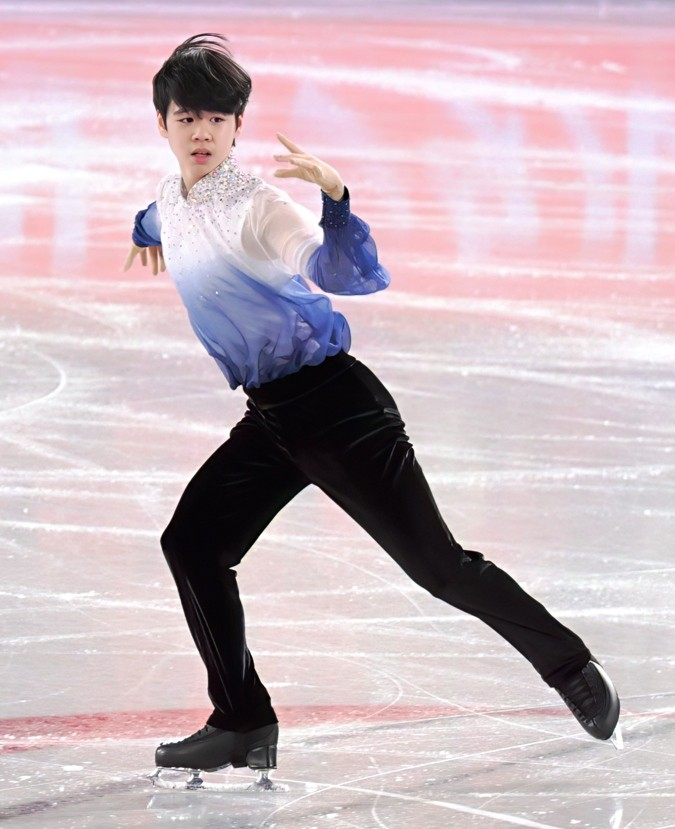
Seo Min-kyu of South Korea

Seo Min-kyu became the first skater from South Korean to win a gold medal at the Junior Grand Prix Final in the men's event. He defeated Rio Nakata of Japan, who had been in the lead after the short program. Seo set new personal-best scores in both the free skate and overall total. Lucius Kazanecki of the United States finished in third place.

Junior men's results
Rank	Skater	Nation	Total points	SP		FS	
1st place, gold medalist(s)	Seo Min-kyu	South Korea	255.91	2	84.82	1	171.09
2nd place, silver medalist(s)	Rio Nakata	Japan	249.70	1	86.48	2	163.22
3rd place, bronze medalist(s)	Lucius Kazanecki	United States	225.85	4	72.13	3	153.72
4	Denis Krouglov	Belgium	225.60	3	74.29	4	151.31
5	Taiga Nishino	Japan	202.60	6	64.01	5	138.59
6	Choi Ha-bin	South Korea	200.70	5	70.94	6	129.76

=== Women's singles ===
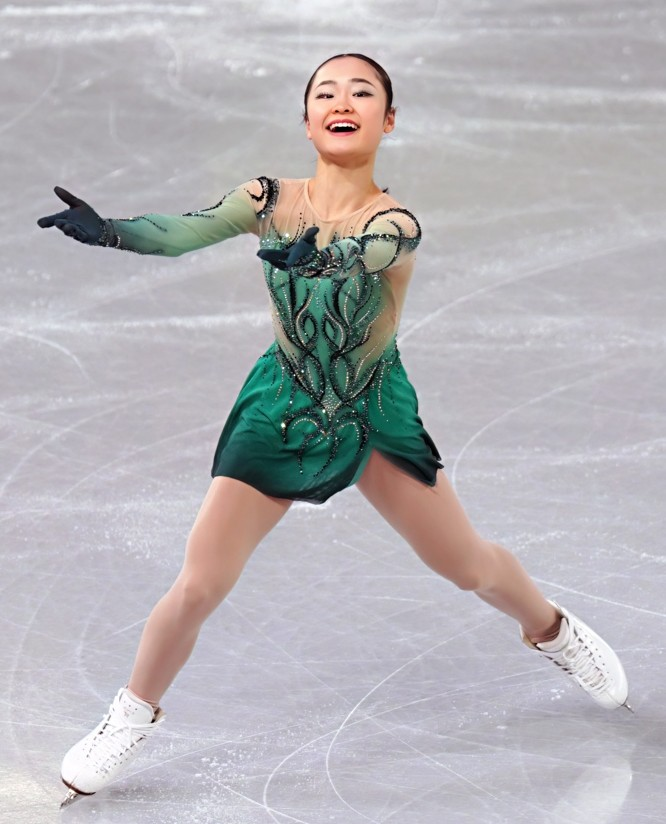
Mao Shimada of Japan

Mao Shimada of Japan won a record fourth Junior Grand Prix title, scoring nearly twenty points higher than silver medalist, Kim Yu-seong of South Korea. Mei Okada of Japan finished in third place.

Junior women's results
Rank	Skater	Nation	Total points	SP		FS	
1st place, gold medalist(s)	Mao Shimada	Japan	218.13	1	73.45	1	144.68
2nd place, silver medalist(s)	Kim Yu-seong	South Korea	198.66	5	64.06	3	134.60
3rd place, bronze medalist(s)	Mei Okada	Japan	195.82	2	68.21	5	127.61
4	Kim Yu-jae	South Korea	195.38	6	60.02	2	135.36
5	Sumika Kanazawa	Japan	195.23	4	66.16	4	129.07
6	Mayuko Oka	Japan	189.63	3	67.93	6	121.70

=== Pairs ===
Guo Rui and Zhang Yiwen of China won the competition, while Zhang Xuanqi and Feng Wenqiang, also of China, finished in second place. Ava Kemp and Yohnatan Elizarov of Canada finished in third place despite a fourth-place finish in the free skate. "We’re disappointed with our free skate today… Still, we made it onto the podium, so it’s encouraging to win the bronze medal,” Kemp stated afterward.

Junior pairs results
Rank	Team	Nation	Total points	SP		FS	
1st place, gold medalist(s)	Guo Rui; Zhang Yiwen	China	177.05	1	63.84	1	113.21
2nd place, silver medalist(s)	Zhang Xuanqi; Feng Wenqiang	China	171.57	2	62.89	2	108.68
3rd place, bronze medalist(s)	Ava Kemp; Yohnatan Elizarov	Canada	166.46	3	62.82	4	103.64
4	Jazmine Desrochers; Kieran Thrasher	Canada	162.90	5	54.45	3	108.45
5	Chen Yuxuan; Dong Yinbo	China	153.02	4	55.63	5	97.39
6	Julia Quattrocchi; Étienne Lacasse	Canada	145.11	6	51.88	6	93.23

=== Ice dance ===
Hana Maria Aboian and Daniil Veselukhin of the United States finished in first place, Ambre Perrier Gianesini and Samuel Blanc Klaperman of France finished in second place, and Iryna Pidgaina and Artem Koval of Ukraine finished in third.

Junior ice dance results
Rank	Team	Nation	Total points	SP		FS	
1st place, gold medalist(s)	Hana Maria Aboian; Daniil Veselukhin	United States	165.45	1	66.77	1	98.68
2nd place, silver medalist(s)	Ambre Perrier Gianesini; Samuel Blanc Klaperman	France	158.28	3	62.35	2	95.93
3rd place, bronze medalist(s)	Iryna Pidgaina; Artem Koval	Ukraine	156.22	2	63.43	4	92.79
4	Dania Mouaden; Théo Bigot	France	149.74	5	59.90	5	89.84
5	Layla Veillon; Alexander Brandys	Canada	145.73	6	52.70	3	93.03
6	Jasmine Robertson; Chase Rohner	United States	140.29	4	60.44	6	79.85

== Records ==
The following new record high score was set during this event.

Record high scores
Date	Skater	Disc.	Segment	Score	Ref.
December 6	(United States) Ilia Malinin	Senior men	Free skate	238.24	

== Works cited ==
- "Special Regulations & Technical Rules – Single & Pair Skating and Ice Dance 2024" (PDF). International Skating Union. Archived (PDF) from the original on June 3, 2025.
