= Garrett Swasey =

American competitive ice skater, figure skating coach, and police officer (1971–2015)

Personal information
- Born: Garrett Preston Russell Swasey; November 16, 1971 Boston, Massachusetts, U.S.
- Died: November 27, 2015 (aged 44) Colorado Springs, Colorado, U.S.
- Education: Melrose High School
- Occupations: Figure skater Ice dance coach Law enforcement officer
- Employers: Plaza of the Rockies ice rink Chapel Hills Mall ice arena University of Colorado Colorado Springs
- Spouse: Rachel Swasey
- Children: 2

Sport
- Club: Broadmoor Skating Club
- Partners: Christine Fowler-Binder; Hillary Tompkins
- Coached by: Sandy Hess; Renée Roca; Gorsha Sur

Achievements and titles
- National finals: 1992 U.S. Championships Ice dance Juniors – Gold; 1995 U.S. Championships Ice dance Seniors – 13th

Garrett Preston Russell Swasey (November 16, 1971 – November 27, 2015) was an American competitive ice skater, figure skating coach, and police officer. As an ice dancer, he won the U.S. junior ice dance title at the 1992 U.S. Figure Skating Championships and went on to participate twice more at the senior level. He coached along with Doreen Denny. Swasey was shot and killed in the line of duty during the Colorado Springs Planned Parenthood shooting in 2015.

== Skating career ==
Swasey began skating competitively as a youngster in the Boston area under coach Keith Lichtman. One of his closest childhood friends and training mates was Nancy Kerrigan, who later became a two-time Olympic medalist in ladies' singles. Swasey competed with three ice dance partners in his skating career.

With Christine Fowler, he first participated in the 1991 U.S. Figure Skating Championships. They placed 14th in the juniors, prompting them to seek a coaching change. In June of the same year, they moved to Colorado Springs to train with Sandy Hess, a prominent ice dance coach, and the Broadmoor Skating Club. Assisting Hess as coaches were Renée Roca and Gorsha Sur, who together would become two-time U.S. ice dance champions.

The following season, Fowler and Swasey won the junior ice dance title at the 1992 U.S. Figure Skating Championships in Orlando. They won a gold medal after they placed third in the compulsory section and advanced to first place after their original and free dances.

In 1993, Fowler and Swasey were mentioned by the Boston Globe among the Olympic hopefuls. However, at the 1993 U.S. Figure Skating Championships, their first event as seniors, they finished 15th in a field of 21. Their coaches, Roca and Sur, won the event after coming out of retirement. Swasey did not participate in the 1994 U.S. Figure Skating Championships.

In February 1995, Swasey and his new ice dance partner, Hillary Tompkins, competed in the 1995 U.S. Figure Skating Championships and placed 13th. On March 11, the team worked on two Musical on Ice shows at the Forum in Presque Isle, Maine, the hometown of Tompkins.

Subsequently, Swasey worked at the Plaza of the Rockies and the Chapel Hills Mall ice rinks. In 2009, he became a University of Colorado Colorado Springs police officer. Alongside, he coached with British ice dance champion and World Figure Skating Hall of Fame member, Doreen Denny, at the Sertich Ice Center until his death.

=== Major competitions ===
National
Event	1991	1992	1993	1994	1995
U.S. Championships	14th J.	1st J.	15th	-	13th

== Life, death and legacy ==
=== Early and personal life ===
Swasey was born in Boston and grew up in Melrose, Massachusetts. He graduated from Melrose High School (1989) in the same class as future Melrose Mayor Robert J. Dolan.

At the time of his death, Swasey was married to Rachel (née Aguilar) and was the father of two young children. He was an elder at his church in Colorado Springs.

=== Death and funeral ===
Swasey was shot dead in the line of duty on November 27, 2015, during a mass shooting at a local Planned Parenthood clinic. He was 44 years old.

Following Swasey's death, President Barack Obama praised Swasey with "May God bless Officer Garrett Swasey and the Americans he tried to save." Swasey's former schoolmate, Melrose's Mayor Dolan, stated at a press conference that, "He made a real mark on the people that he met in this small town. He was so dedicated to his church and his community."

The funeral, with thousands in attendance, took place on December 4 and was streamed live. Speakers included Colorado Governor John Hickenlooper, Colorado Springs Mayor John Suthers and University of Colorado Colorado Springs Chancellor Pam Shockley-Zalabak.

=== Aftermath and legacy ===
On April 15, 2016, almost five months after Swasey was killed, his oath as a Deputy Sheriff was notarized, raising questions about procedures of the El Paso County Police Department. The murderer of Swasey, Robert Dear, was found to be incompetent to stand for a trial in May 2016, May 2017, and July 2018.

U.S. Figure Skating, at the initiative of Broadmoor Skating Club, named the Garrett Swasey Memorial Trophy for the juvenile dance competition champions at the Midwestern Sectional Figure Skating Championships. First winners of the trophy were Elliana and Ethan Peal.

Garrett's widow, Rachel Swasey, lobbied to create a fund for fallen first responders. A bill unanimously passed the Colorado House of Representatives in May 2018. Donors organized to give protective gear to the UCCS Police Department following Swasey's death.
