= Sandy Hess =

American Olympian figure skating coach (born 1928)

Sandra Kay "Sandy" Hess-Gerathy (born 1949) is an American Olympian figure skating coach. From 1988 to 1996 she was the Ice Dance Director of the Broadmoor Skating Club in Colorado Springs, Colorado, a leading center for figure skating.

Notable figure skaters coached by Hess:

- Peter Breen
- Christina Chitwood
- Richard Dalley
- Joseph Druar
- Carol Fox
- Melissa Gregory
- Mark Hanretty
- Rachel Mayer
- Denis Petukhov
- Elizabeth Punsalan
- Renée Roca
- Gorsha Sur
- Jerod Swallow
- Garrett Swasey
- Susan Wynne

Hess is married to Albert Joseph "Bud" Gerathy, Jr, who worked as a dentist in Monument, Colorado until retirement in 2016.
