= Daniil Veselukhin =

American ice dancer

Personal information
- Full name: Daniil Veselukhin
- Born: June 1, 2007 (age 19) Kirov, Russia
- Home town: Newington, Connecticut, U.S.
- Height: 182 cm (6 ft 0 in)

Figure skating career
- Country: United States
- Discipline: Ice Dance
- Partner: Hana Maria Aboian
- Coach: Melissa Gregory; Denis Petukhov
- Skating club: The Skating Club of New York
- Began skating: 2010

Medal record
World Junior Championships
Gold medal – first place	2026 Tallinn	Ice dance
Junior Grand Prix Final
Gold medal – first place	2025–26 Nagoya	Ice dance

Daniil Andreevich Veselukhin (Russian: Даниил Андреевич Веселухин; born 1 June 2007) is an American ice dancer. With his skating partner, Hana Maria Aboian, he is the 2026 World Junior champion, the 2025–26 Junior Grand Prix Final gold medalist, a three-time ISU Junior Grand Prix gold medalist, and a two-time U.S. junior national champion (2025, 2026).

== Competitive highlights ==
- JGP – Event of the ISU Junior Grand Prix Series
- TBD – Assigned
- WD – Withdrew from competition

=== Ice dance with Hana Maria Aboian ===
Competition placements at junior level
Season	2024–25	2025–26	2026–27
World Junior Championships	7th	1st	
Junior Grand Prix Final		1st	
U.S. Championships	1st	1st	
JGP Poland			2nd
JGP Thailand	2nd	1st	
JGP Turkey	3rd		1st
JGP United Arab Emirates		1st	
Budapest Trophy			1st
Lake Placid Ice Dance International	1st	1st	1st
Mezzaluna Cup		1st	
Santa Claus Cup	2nd		

== Detailed results ==
=== Ice dance with Hana Maria Aboian ===
ISU personal best scores in the +5/-5 GOE System
Segment	Type	Score	Event
Total	TSS	170.37	2026 Budapest Trophy
Rhythm dance	TSS	70.63	2026 Budapest Trophy
Rhythm dance	TES	39.51	2026 Budapest Trophy
Rhythm dance	PCS	31.12	2026 Budapest Trophy
Free dance	TSS	100.41	2025 JGP United Arab Emirates
Free dance	TES	54.89	2025 JGP United Arab Emirates
Free dance	PCS	46.80	2026 Budapest Trophy

- Small medals for the short program and free skating are only awarded at ISU Championships.

=== Junior level ===
Results in the 2024–25 season
Date	Event	RD		FD		Total	
Date	Event	P	Score	P	Score	P	Score
Jul 30–31, 2024	(United States) 2024 Lake Placid Ice Dance International	1	59.37	1	95.91	1	155.28
Sep 11–14, 2024	2024 JGP Thailand	2	64.31	2	95.81	2	160.12
Sep 18–21, 2024	2024 JGP Turkey	2	61.80	2	94.16	3	155.96
Nov 27 – Dec 2, 2024	(Hungary) 2024 Santa Claus Cup	2	63.27	2	95.27	2	158.54
Jun 20–26, 2025	(United States) 2025 U.S. Championships (Junior)	1	65.00	1	97.40	1	162.40
Feb 25 – Mar 2, 2025	(Hungary) 2025 World Junior Championships	7	59.64	6	93.57	7	153.21

Results in the 2025–26 season
Date	Event	RD		FD		Total	
Date	Event	P	Score	P	Score	P	Score
Jul 29–30, 2025	(United States) 2025 Lake Placid Ice Dance International	1	64.42	1	85.48	1	149.90
Sep 9–13, 2025	2025 JGP Thailand	1	61.00	1	92.96	1	153.96
Oct 8–11, 2025	2025 JGP United Arab Emirates	1	66.70	1	100.41	1	167.11
Oct 15–19, 2025	(Italy) 2025 Mezzaluna Cup	1	68.57	1	97.73	1	166.30
Dec 4–7, 2025	(Japan) 2025–26 Junior Grand Prix Final	1	66.77	1	98.68	1	165.45
Jun 4–11, 2026	(United States) 2026 U.S. Championships (Junior)	1	71.68	1	102.79	1	174.47
Mar 3–8, 2026	(Estonia) 2026 World Junior Championships	1	66.45	1	100.26	1	166.71

Results in the 2026–27 season
Date	Event	RD		FD		Total	
Date	Event	P	Score	P	Score	P	Score
Jul 28–30, 2026	(United States) 2026 Lake Placid Ice Dance International	1	65.99	1	100.05	1	166.04
Sep 17–19, 2026	2026 JGP Turkey	1	66.17	1	97.26	1	163.43
Oct 8–10, 2026	2026 JGP Poland	1	68.93	6	84.10	2	153.03
Oct 16–18, 2026	(Hungary) 2026 Budapest Trophy	1	70.63	1	99.74	1	170.37
