= Hana Maria Aboian =

American ice dancer

Personal information
- Full name: Hana Maria Aboian
- Born: May 19, 2010 (age 16) Lebanon, New Hampshire, U.S.
- Home town: Newington, Connecticut, U.S.
- Height: 160 cm (5 ft 3 in)

Figure skating career
- Country: United States
- Discipline: Ice Dance
- Partner: Daniil Veselukhin
- Coach: Melissa Gregory; Denis Petukhov
- Skating club: Peninsula Skating Club
- Began skating: 2013

Medal record
World Junior Championships
| Gold medal – first place | 2026 Tallinn | Ice dance |
Junior Grand Prix Final
| Gold medal – first place | 2025–26 Nagoya | Ice dance |

Hana Maria Aboian (born 19 May 2010) is an American ice dancer. With her skating partner, Daniil Veselukhin, she is the 2026 World Junior champion, the 2025–26 Junior Grand Prix Final gold medalist, a three-time ISU Junior Grand Prix gold medalist, and a two-time U.S. junior national champion (2025, 2026).

== Early life ==
Hana Maria Aboian was born in Lebanon, New Hampshire, and began skating at the age of three after watching the film Frozen. Before transitioning fully to ice dance, she trained as a single skater and competed at the regional and sectional levels. In addition to her skating training, Aboian studied Vaganova method ballet intensively for eight years and competed in rhythmic gymnastics at the regional level.

== Competitive highlights ==
- JGP – Event of the ISU Junior Grand Prix Series
- TBD – Assigned
- WD – Withdrew from competition

=== Ice Dance with Daniil Veselukhin ===
Competition placements at junior level
| Season | 2024–25 | 2025–26 | 2026–27 |
|---|---|---|---|
| World Junior Championships | 7th | 1st | |
| Junior Grand Prix Final | | 1st | |
| U.S. Championships | 1st | 1st | |
| JGP Poland | | | 2nd |
| JGP Thailand | 2nd | 1st | |
| JGP Turkey | 3rd | | 1st |
| JGP United Arab Emirates | | 1st | |
| Budapest Trophy | | | 1st |
| Lake Placid Ice Dance International | 1st | 1st | 1st |
| Mezzaluna Cup | | 1st | |
| Santa Claus Cup | 2nd | | |

== Detailed results ==
=== Ice Dance with Daniil Veselukhin ===
ISU personal best scores in the +5/-5 GOE System
| Segment | Type | Score | Event |
|---|---|---|---|
| Total | TSS | 170.37 | 2026 Budapest Trophy |
| Rhythm dance | TSS | 70.63 | 2026 Budapest Trophy |
| Rhythm dance | TES | 39.51 | 2026 Budapest Trophy |
| Rhythm dance | PCS | 31.12 | 2026 Budapest Trophy |
| Free dance | TSS | 100.41 | 2025 JGP United Arab Emirates |
| Free dance | TES | 54.89 | 2025 JGP United Arab Emirates |
| Free dance | PCS | 46.80 | 2026 Budapest Trophy |

- Small medals for the short program and free skating are only awarded at ISU Championships.

=== Junior level ===
Results in the 2024–25 season
| Date | Event | RD | | FD | | Total | |
| Date | Event | P | Score | P | Score | P | Score |
|---|---|---|---|---|---|---|---|
| Jul 30–31, 2024 | (United States) 2024 Lake Placid Ice Dance International | 1 | 59.37 | 1 | 95.91 | 1 | 155.28 |
| Sep 11–14, 2024 | 2024 JGP Thailand | 2 | 64.31 | 2 | 95.81 | 2 | 160.12 |
| Sep 18–21, 2024 | 2024 JGP Turkey | 2 | 61.80 | 2 | 94.16 | 3 | 155.96 |
| Nov 27 – Dec 2, 2024 | (Hungary) 2024 Santa Claus Cup | 2 | 63.27 | 2 | 95.27 | 2 | 158.54 |
| Jun 20–26, 2025 | (United States) 2025 U.S. Championships (Junior) | 1 | 65.00 | 1 | 97.40 | 1 | 162.40 |
| Feb 25 – Mar 2, 2025 | (Hungary) 2025 World Junior Championships | 7 | 59.64 | 6 | 93.57 | 7 | 153.21 |

Results in the 2025–26 season
| Date | Event | RD | | FD | | Total | |
| Date | Event | P | Score | P | Score | P | Score |
|---|---|---|---|---|---|---|---|
| Jul 29–30, 2025 | (United States) 2025 Lake Placid Ice Dance International | 1 | 64.42 | 1 | 85.48 | 1 | 149.90 |
| Sep 9–13, 2025 | 2025 JGP Thailand | 1 | 61.00 | 1 | 92.96 | 1 | 153.96 |
| Oct 8–11, 2025 | 2025 JGP United Arab Emirates | 1 | 66.70 | 1 | 100.41 | 1 | 167.11 |
| Oct 15–19, 2025 | (Italy) 2025 Mezzaluna Cup | 1 | 68.57 | 1 | 97.73 | 1 | 166.30 |
| Dec 4–7, 2025 | (Japan) 2025–26 Junior Grand Prix Final | 1 | 66.77 | 1 | 98.68 | 1 | 165.45 |
| Jun 4–11, 2026 | (United States) 2026 U.S. Championships (Junior) | 1 | 71.68 | 1 | 102.79 | 1 | 174.47 |
| Mar 3–8, 2026 | (Estonia) 2026 World Junior Championships | 1 | 66.45 | 1 | 100.26 | 1 | 166.71 |

Results in the 2026–27 season
| Date | Event | RD | | FD | | Total | |
| Date | Event | P | Score | P | Score | P | Score |
|---|---|---|---|---|---|---|---|
| Jul 28–30, 2026 | (United States) 2026 Lake Placid Ice Dance International | 1 | 65.99 | 1 | 100.05 | 1 | 166.04 |
| Sep 17–19, 2026 | 2026 JGP Turkey | 1 | 66.17 | 1 | 97.26 | 1 | 163.43 |
| Oct 8–10, 2026 | 2026 JGP Poland | 1 | 68.93 | 6 | 84.10 | 2 | 153.03 |
| Oct 16–18, 2026 | (Hungary) 2026 Budapest Trophy | 1 | 70.63 | 1 | 99.74 | 1 | 170.37 |
