= Mao Shimada =

Japanese figure skater (born 2008)

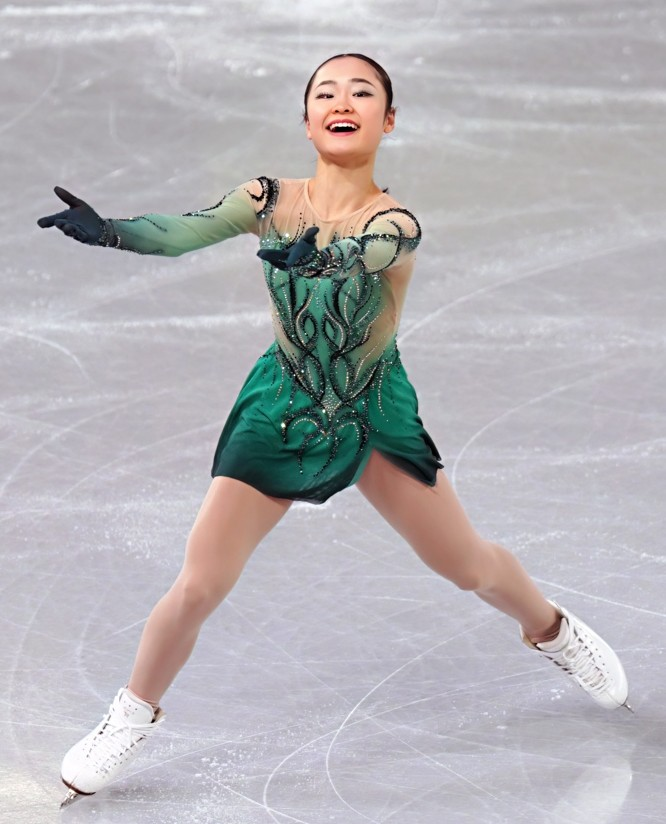
- Shimada during the short program at the 2024–25 Junior Grand Prix Final

Personal information
- Native name: 島田 麻央
- Born: October 30, 2008 (age 18) Koganei, Tokyo, Japan
- Home town: Uji, Kyoto
- Height: 1.53 m (5 ft 0 in)

Figure skating career
- Country: Japan
- Discipline: Women's singles
- Coach: Mie Hamada, Satsuki Muramoto, Hiroaki Sato, Noriyuki Kanzaki
- Skating club: Kinoshita Academy
- Began skating: 2014
Medal record
Figure skating: Women's singles
Representing Japan
Youth Olympic Games
Gold medal – first place	2024 Gangwon	Women's singles
World Junior Championships
Gold medal – first place	2023 Calgary	Women's singles
Gold medal – first place	2024 Taipei	Women's singles
Gold medal – first place	2025 Debrecen	Women's singles
Gold medal – first place	2026 Tallinn	Women's singles
Junior Grand Prix Final
Gold medal – first place	2022–23 Turin	Women's singles
Gold medal – first place	2023–24 Beijing	Women's singles
Gold medal – first place	2024–25 Grenoble	Women's singles
Gold medal – first place	2025–26 Nagoya	Women's singles
Japan Championships
Silver medal – second place	2026 Tokyo	Women's singles
Silver medal – second place	2025 Osaka	Women's singles
Bronze medal – third place	2024 Nagano	Women's singles
Bronze medal – third place	2023 Osaka	Women's singles

Mao Shimada (島田 麻央, Shimada Mao; born October 30, 2008) is a Japanese figure skater. She is a two-time senior Grand Prix gold medalist.

On the junior level, she is the 2024 Youth Olympic champion, a four-time World Junior champion (2023, 2024, 2025, 2026), a four-time ISU Junior Grand Prix Final champion (2022–23, 2023–24, 2024–25, 2025-26), 2026 Skate Canada International Champion, an eight-time ISU Junior Grand Prix gold medalist, a four-time Japanese national medalist (silver in 2025 and 2026, bronze in 2023 and 2024), and a five-time Japanese junior national champion (2021–2025).

She is the twenty-first woman in history to have successfully landed a triple Axel jump, fourteenth woman to successfully land a quadruple jump and second Japanese woman to land a quadruple toeloop in competition.

As a junior skater, Shimada won all 19 international events she competed in, accomplishing a Junior Golden Slam as well as 4 consecutive Junior Grand Slams, making her the most dominant skater in the junior field in the history of figure skating.

== Personal life ==
Shimada was born on 30 October 2008 in Koganei, Tokyo, Japan. Her mother, Ayumi, was a fan of Japanese figure skater Mao Asada and named Shimada after her. She also has a sister, Aoi, who is three years younger than her.

In 2020, when Shimada was twelve, she, her mother, and sister moved from Tokyo to Kyoto so that Shimada could train at the Kinoshita Skating Academy under Mie Hamada. In addition to figure skating, Shimada also enjoys dancing, bowling, and cooking.

As of March 2021, she graduated from Okubo Elementary School and attended Hirono Junior High School, where she graduated in 2024. She is currently attending Chukyo University Affiliated Chukyo High School.

== Career ==
=== Early years ===
Shimada began skating at age five after watching Mao Asada at the 2014 Winter Olympics. She finished in fifth place at the 2018 Japan Novice B National Championships.

=== 2019–20 season ===
Shimada won the 2019 Japan Novice B National Championships scoring 88.50.

=== 2020–21 season ===
Shimada won the 2020 Japan Novice A National Championships. Although she attempted a triple Axel in the free program, she fell, and the jump was marked as downgraded. As a result, Shimada was invited to compete at the junior category of the event, where she placed third behind teammates Hana Yoshida and Rino Matsuike. As the reigning Japanese national novice champion, Shimada was also invited to skate in the gala at the 2020 NHK Trophy.

In April 2020, Shimada switched coaches from Koji Okajima, who had been coaching her since January 2019, to Mie Hamada.

=== 2021–22 season ===
Shimada started her season competing at the 2021 Kinki Regional Championships. She opened her program, landing a clean quad toe loop. She was selected for the 2021 Japan Novice National Championships and won the competition. She was then invited to compete in the junior division.

At 2021–22 Japan Junior National Championships, she skated a clean short program but still placed fourth. However, Shimada managed to land the quad toe once again and won the competition over Rion Sumiyoshi and Mone Chiba. She was still too young to compete in the senior event.

Shimada was sent to 2022 Egna Trophy to compete in the advanced novice category. She attempted a triple Axel during the free program, but the jump was landed on a quarter. Winning the gold medal, she outscored Canadian silver medalist Hetty Shi by 32.63 points.

=== 2022–23 season: Junior World and JGP Final gold ===
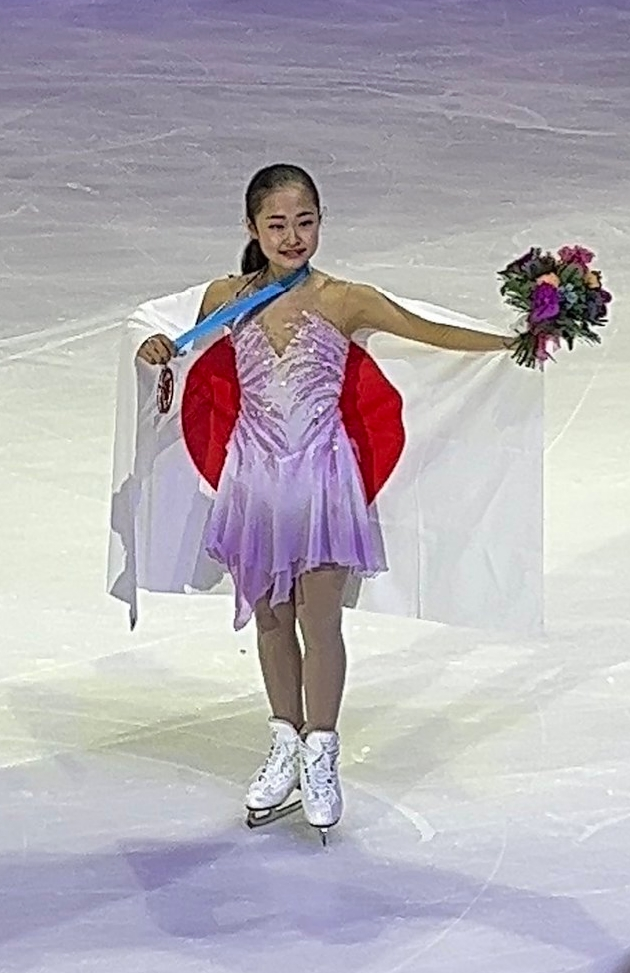
Shimada at the 2022–23 Junior Grand Prix Final

In early September 2022, Shimada made her ISU Junior Grand Prix debut at the event in Ostrava, Czech Republic. She landed all her jumps cleanly in her short program and placed first with 71.49 points. During the free skate, Shimada successfully landed a triple Axel and became the twenty-first woman to land it in international competition. She then attempted a quadruple toe loop but underrotated the jump, resulting in a fall; the program was otherwise clean. Shimada won the event with a lead of 23.28 points over South Korea's Kwon Min-sol. At her second Junior Grand Prix assignment in Gdańsk, Poland, Shimada scored 68.81 in the short program after landing her jump combination on a quarter. She landed a clean triple Axel and a quadruple toe loop on a quarter in the free skate, winning the event and earning new season bests for the free skate and total score. These results qualified her for 2022–23 Junior Grand Prix Final.

Following her Junior Grand Prix victories, Shimada successfully defended her title at the 2022–23 Japan Junior Championships. After winning the short program, she fell on her opening triple Axel attempt in the free skate but went on to land her quad and her remaining triple jumps to finish first there as well. Two weeks later at the Final in Turin, Shimada landed all her jumps successfully in the short program, albeit with her triple Lutz deemed landed on a quarter. With a score of 69.66 points, she finished first in the segment, 0.55 points of reigning World Junior silver medalist Shin Ji-a of South Korea. In the free skate, she stepped out of her triple Axel and underrotated her quad attempt, but was first in that segment as well, winning the gold medal with an overall margin of 5.22 points over Shin. Shimada claimed to "aim for the performance that satisfies myself and not the placement," adding that while it was "a big competition and a big victory and it gave me the confidence" that "my goal was to land the first two jump, both the triple Axel and the quad toe, so I regret a little that that didn’t happen this time." She was the first Japanese and first non-Russian women's champion at the event since Kanako Murakami in 2009.

Attending her first senior Japan Championships, Shimada was fourth in the short program with a 70.28 score, her first over the 70-point mark domestically. She said she was "glad I was able to put it together in a very tense situation." In the free skate, Shimada fell twice on her opening triple Axel and quad attempts, before landing seven clean triple jumps. She was fifth in the segment, but rose to third overall in a somewhat chaotic field, winning the bronze medal. Too young for international senior assignments, she was assigned to finishing her season at the 2023 World Junior Championships.

At the World Junior Championships in Calgary, Shimada finished first in the short program with a new personal best, 0.59 points ahead of Shin in second place. She described practices in the leadup as difficult, as thus was pleased with her performance on the day. Two days later in the free skate, Shimada landed both her triple axel and quadruple toe loop, although the latter jump was completed on the quarter. She then skated the rest of her program cleanly, receiving another personal best of 152.76, winning the event with the fifth highest score ever recorded by a junior woman. Her margin of victory of 22.64 over silver medalist Shin Ji-a was the same exact margin as her namesake Mao Asada over Yuna Kim of South Korea at the 2005 World Junior Championships. Shimada became the first Japanese woman to win Junior Worlds since Marin Honda in 2016, and alongside country mate and bronze medalist Ami Nakai, secured three spots for Japanese women the following year.

As the 2022 Japanese national junior champion, she was invited to skate in the gala at the 2023 World Championships.

=== 2023–24 season: Youth Olympic champion & 2-time Junior World and JGP Final champion ===
With previous choreographer Lori Nichol again handling Shimada's free program for the new season, she collaborated with Kaitlyn Weaver on a short program to Lady Gaga's "Americano". The program was inspired by the Mexican folktale "La Carambada," with Shimada portraying a female thief that steals from the rich and gives to the poor. Additionally, Canadian violinist, Judy Kang, who has previously worked and performed with Lady Gaga, helped arrange the music specifically for Shimada. Prior to the season starting, Shimada said that in addition to defending her titles from the previous year, her goals included winning the 2024 Winter Youth Olympics.

Shimada began the Junior Grand Prix on home soil, with Osaka playing host to the 2023 JGP Japan. Shimada, the heavy favourite, set a new personal best score in the short program. She finished first in the free skate as well, despite falling on her downgraded quad attempt. She went on to win another gold medal at the 2023 JGP Armenia, posting a 33-point margin over American silver medalist Elyce Lin-Gracey, her only error again being a fall on her quad toe loop attempt. Shimada said she was "happy" with the result, "but a little bit sad" at the issues landing the quad.

Shimada entered the 2023–24 Japan Junior Championships as the heavy favourite for a record-equaling third consecutive gold medal. She unexpectedly placed fourth in the short program after failing to complete her jump combination, which she attributed to nervousness because of her desire to qualify to attend the Youth Olympics and the World Junior Championships. She rallied in the free skate, where she fell on her quad attempt but landed eight clean triple jumps, finishing twelve points ahead silver medalist Ikura Kushida. She joined Shizuka Arakawa and Miki Ando as the only women to win three consecutive national junior titles, saying "I wonder if I got closer to the two of them."

She was invited to skate in the gala at the 2023 NHK Trophy as the three-time Japanese national junior champion.

At the 2023–24 Junior Grand Prix Final, Shimada came second in the short program, behind primary rival Shin Ji-a, after an error on the landing of her triple Lutz. She said she was "very upset" at the mistake, attributing it to nervousness from having previously made a mistake at the junior national championship. In the free skate, she successfully landed her quadruple toe loop for the first time, becoming only the second Japanese woman to do so, and also landed her triple Axel and all but one of her other planned jumps. She won the segment and rose to take the gold medal. She became the second woman to win the Junior Grand Prix Final twice, after Ando, and the first to do so consecutively. At the end of the month, Shimada attended the senior national championships. She successfully landed a triple Axel in the short program, but fell on her triple Lutz and thereby failed to execute a jump combination, coming seventh in the segment. In the free skate she landed seven triple jumps, fell on her quad attempt and singled a planned triple loop, finishing third in the segment and winning her second national bronze medal.

Competing in the women's event at the Youth Olympics in Gangwon, the site of the 2018 Winter Olympics, Shimada won the short program by almost four points over second-place Yo Takagi, and was nearly five points ahead of Shin, who was considered her primary challenger. In the free skate she fell on her quad toe loop and had several other jump rotation issues, but won that segment over Shin as well by 0.59 points, and captured the gold medal by 5.16 points. She was the first Japanese woman to win the Youth Olympic title, declaring this "was my goal all long and while I didn’t openly say it here, I was out to win a gold medal. It makes me so happy that I did it, and I'm glad to see my friend Yo on the podium with me."

Shimada concluded the season at the 2024 World Junior Championships in Taipei, in another presumed contest with Shin for the gold medal. She finished second in the short program, 0.88 points back of Shin, after her triple flip received an edge warning. She went on to win the free skate, landing her quadruple jump and six clean triple jumps, while stepping out of her triple Axel. Finishing first overall, Shimada said she was "very happy" to have won consecutive World Junior titles.

=== 2024–25 season: Third consecutive Junior World and JGP Final titles ===
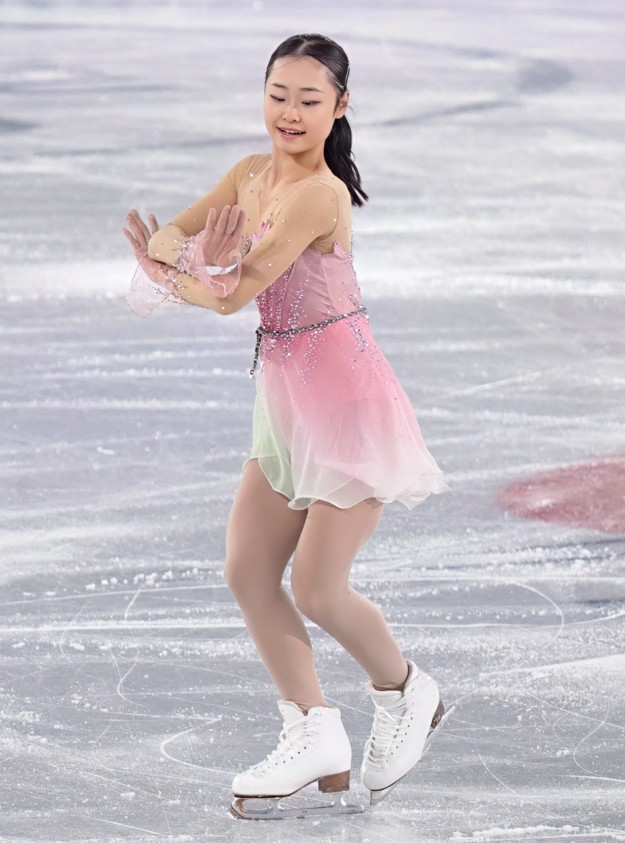
Shimada performing her free skate at the 2024–25 Junior Grand Prix Final

After selecting the song "Defying Gravity" from the musical, Wicked, to use for her short program music, Shimada went to watch the live musical showing in Japan over the summer to take inspiration for her performance. She also got to meet the Japanese actress that played Elphaba on stage. For her 2024–25 free program music, Shimada requested to her choreographer, Lori Nichol, that she skate to Japanese music. Upon discovering the song, "Mado Kara Mieru," Nichol suggested that Shimada use this music to represent the four seasons of Japan, starting and ending with spring. Shimada liked this concept and decided to use it for her free program. Christopher Tin, the composer of Shimada's free program music, would later praise her interpretation of his music.

On the Junior Grand Prix, Shimada claimed victory at the 2024 JGP Latvia, winning by a wide margin despite errors on her quad toe loop and triple Axel. She went on to take a second gold medal at 2024 JGP Poland with a new personal best score of 224.68, after skating a clean short program and a nearly clean free skate, with the only mistake being landing her quadruple toe loop on the quarter. With these results, Shimada qualified for the JGP Final for a third time.

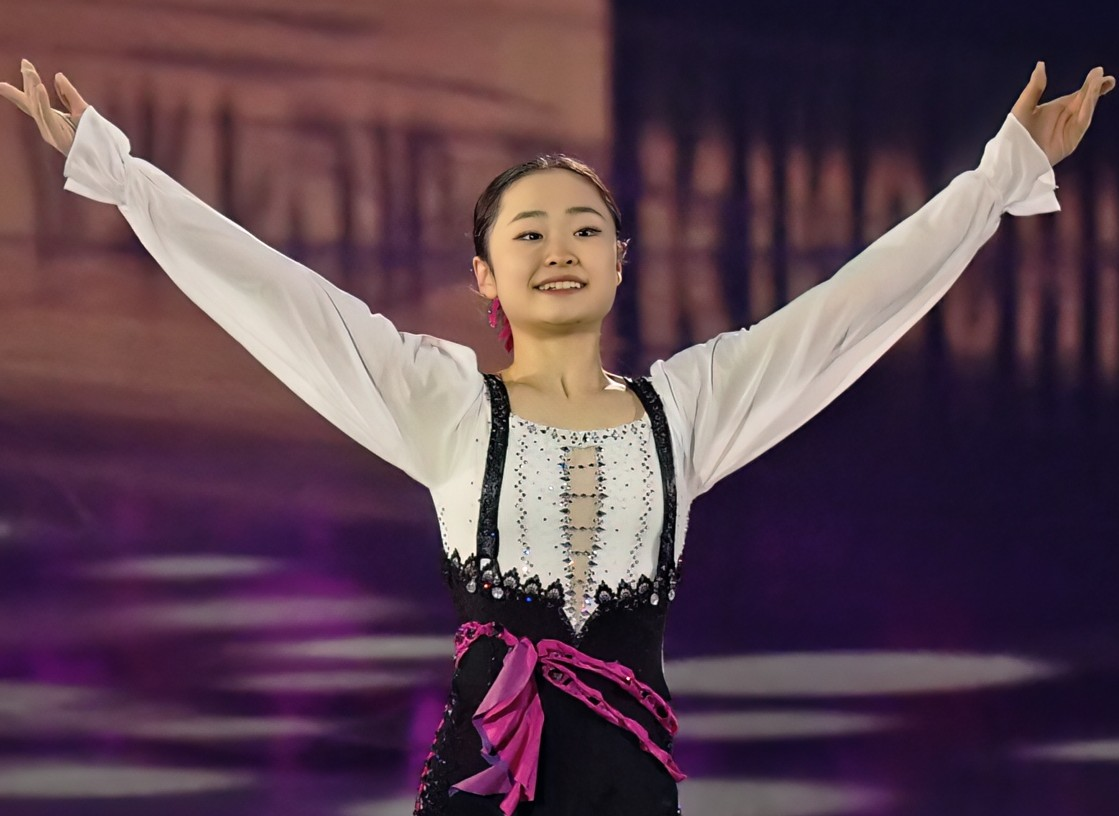
Shimada during the gala at the 2024–25 Junior Grand Prix Final

In late November, Shimada competed at the 2024–25 Japan Junior Championships, where she won the national title for a fourth consecutive time. Weeks later, Shimada competed at the Junior Grand Prix Final in Grenoble, France. In the short program, Shimada would earn a new season's best score that was only 0.02 points off her personal best. Despite mistakes in the free program, including two falls and stepping out of a jump, Shimada would still win that segment of the competition, thus winning gold for a third consecutive time and leading a Japanese sweep of the podium alongside Kaoruko Wada and Ami Nakai. She expressed enthusiasm at having been part of the "historical sweep for Japan" and on her third consecutive win, though adding that "my skate today was full of mistakes and that is very disappointing for me." Two weeks later, she won the silver medal at the 2024–25 Japan Championships, finishing behind reigning World champion Kaori Sakamoto after placing second in both the short and free program segments.

Finishing the season at the 2025 World Junior Championships in Debrecen, Shimada won the short program with a score of 74.68, leading second-place Inga Gurgenidze of Georgia by 7.21 points. “I couldn't quite get 74 as a score before, so I'm really happy to have achieved that,” she said. She went on to win the free skate as well, earning a new personal best 156.16 points and claiming her third consecutive World Junior title. She had a final margin of over 40 points over silver medalist Shin Ji-a of South Korea. Shimada remarked that "the first time I just came here to enjoy and have fun. The second time, I was really nervous because I wanted to win. The third time I wanted to enjoy again and do the best I can do." Following her free skate, Shimada was cited by commentators as "The Greatest Junior World Champion of All Time".

Shimada was invited to skate in the gala at the 2025 World Team Trophy as the three-time World Junior champion.

=== 2025–26 season: Fourth consecutive Junior World and JGP Final titles ===
During the summer off-season, Shimada injured the sole of her right foot. Despite this, she began competing in early August at the Kinoshita Summer Cup, an annual Japanese domestic competition. Shimada won both segments of the competition and performed an entirely clean free skate landing both a triple axel and quad toe-loop. She took the gold medal overall. Yoshiki, the composer of the program's music praised her performance on X, tweeting, "Wonderful skating to Miracle. As the composer, I’m very happy. I’m cheering for you. Amazing skating performance, thank you for using my composition."

She next competed at a second domestic Japanese competition, this time the 2025 Tokyo Summer Trophy. She skated a clean short program and went into first place. In the free skate her only mistake was a step out on her quad-toeloop attempt. She otherwise skated cleanly and won the gold medal by over thirty points.

Going on to compete internationally, Shimada began the 2025–26 Junior Grand Prix series by winning gold at 2025 JGP Thailand. Two weeks before her second Junior Grand Prix assignment, Shimada sustained a bone bruise in her left ankle and as a result, was advised to not jump the quad toe-loop at the upcoming event. Despite this, Shimada managed to win the gold medal at the 2025 JGP United Arab Emirates by almost eight-and-a-half points. Her Junior Grand Prix series results allowed her to qualify for the 2025–26 Junior Grand Prix Final.

In late November, she competed at the 2025–26 Japan Junior Championships, where she won the junior national title for a fifth consecutive time, becoming the first Japanese skater to do so.

Going on to compete at the Junior Grand Prix Final, Shimada won the title for a fourth consecutive time. Two weeks later, she won the silver medal behind Kaori Sakamoto at the 2025–26 Japan Championships.

To finish her junior career, at the 2026 World Junior Championships in Tallinn, Estonia, Shimada won the short program with a score of 71.90, leading second-place countrymate, Mayuko Oka, by 2.13 points. She went on to place second in the free skate behind Australian, Hana Bath, however her lead in the short program kept her in first place overall. "I was exhausted today," admitted Shimada after the free skate. "However, I was able to finish my skating, and I think the fact that I never gave up and finished my skate led to this result. Winning four consecutive titles is not easy. This season had more struggles than good times." Shimada became the first woman in history in both junior and senior divisions to win 4 consecutive world championships.

=== 2026–27 season: Senior international debut ===
Shimada made her senior international debut at the 2026 CS Kinoshita Group Cup. She placed second in the short program behind Ami Nakai. In the free skating segment, she earned a score of 152.48 which ultimately led her to place first in that segment and win the gold medal. Her total score of 231.32 was a new personal best.

Shimada made her senior Grand Prix debut at the 2026 Skate Canada International. Shimada earned a new personal best short program score and overall total score of 235.44. Ultimately, she secured the gold medal with a sizable margin of 14.37, over silver medalist Niina Petrõkina. “Of course, I feel like I could have done better,” Shimada said after the free skate. “However, this is my first Grand Prix Series, and I was able to complete my skate with a smile on my face, and I was able to enjoy my performance. So overall, I think I did pretty well today.”

Shimada continued this momentum, and won the gold medal at the 2026 Finlandia Trophy, securing herself a placement at the upcoming Grand Prix Final. “I've always watched the skaters competing at the Grand Prix Final and dreamed of being there alongside them one day,” she said. “Now that I finally have this opportunity, I'm incredibly happy and really looking forward to it!”

== Programs ==
- Program details mentioned at first occurrence

Competition and exhibition programs by season
Season	Short program	Free skate program	Exhibition program
2020–21	Cinderella: Composed by Patrick Doyle; Choreo. by Cathy Reed	"Jupiter, the Bringer of Jollity": From The Planets; Composed by Gustav Holst; Choreo. by Cathy Reed	—N/a
2021–22	The Lion King: 1. Spirit; 2. Rafiki's Fireflies; Composed by Hans Zimmer; Performed by Beyoncé; Choreo. by Cathy Reed	The Queen's Gambit: 1. Borgov II; 2. Main Title; 3. Moscow Invitational 1968; 4. Training with Mr. Schaibel; Composed by Carlos Rafael Rivera; Choreo. by Cathy Reed	—N/a
2022–23	The Lion King	"Passepied": 1. "Passepied"; Composed by Jean-Michel Blais; 2. Wild Swans; Composed by Elena Kats-Chernin; Performed by Daniel Hope & Jacques Ammon; Choreo. by Lori Nichol	He Lives in You: Composed by Lebo M, Mark Mancina, & Jay Rifkin; Performed by Diana Ross; Choreo. by Cathy Reed
2022–23	The Lion King	"Passepied": 1. "Passepied"; Composed by Jean-Michel Blais; 2. Wild Swans; Composed by Elena Kats-Chernin; Performed by Daniel Hope & Jacques Ammon; Choreo. by Lori Nichol	"I Want Candy": Performed by Bow Wow Wow
2023–24	"Americano": Performed by Judy Kang, Karl Hugo; Choreo. by Kaitlyn Weaver	"Benedictus": Composed by Karl Jenkins; Choreo. by Lori Nichol	"Champion (Teddy Rose Remix)": Performed by Bishop Briggs; Choreo. by Kana Muramoto
2024–25	"Defying Gravity": From Wicked; Composed by Stephen Schwartz; Performed by Idina Menzel & Kristin Chenoweth; Choreo. by Kaitlyn Weaver	"Mado Kara Mieru": Composed by Christopher Tin; Performed by Lia, Aoi Tada, & Kaori Omura; Choreo. by Lori Nichol	Americano
2024–25	"Defying Gravity": From Wicked; Composed by Stephen Schwartz; Performed by Idina Menzel & Kristin Chenoweth; Choreo. by Kaitlyn Weaver	"Mado Kara Mieru": Composed by Christopher Tin; Performed by Lia, Aoi Tada, & Kaori Omura; Choreo. by Lori Nichol	Wicked Medley: 1. "No One Mourns the Wicked"; 2. For Good; 3. "Finale “Wicked”"; Composed by Stephen Schwartz; Performed by Idina Menzel & Kristin Chenoweth
2024–25	"Defying Gravity": From Wicked; Composed by Stephen Schwartz; Performed by Idina Menzel & Kristin Chenoweth; Choreo. by Kaitlyn Weaver	"Mado Kara Mieru": Composed by Christopher Tin; Performed by Lia, Aoi Tada, & Kaori Omura; Choreo. by Lori Nichol	Defying Gravity
2025–26	"Jazz Medley": 1. Get Happy; Composed by Harold Arlen; Performed by Ella Fitzgerald; 2. Sing, Sing, Sing (with a Swing); Composed by Louis Prima; Performed by BBC Big Band; Choreo. by Kaitlyn Weaver	"Miracle (Sarah's Version)": Performed by Yoshiki & Sarah Brightman; Choreo. by Marie-France Dubreuil	Defying Gravity
2026–27	"Between Two Worlds": Performed by Mili; Choreo. by Kana Muramoto	Waloyo Yamoni: 1. I. We Overcome the Wind; 2. IV. We Overcome the Wind (Reprise); 3. II. A Drizzling Confusion; Composed by Christopher Tin; Choreo. by Shae-Lynn Bourne	—N/a

== Competitive highlights ==
- GP – Event of the ISU Grand Prix Series
- JGP – Event of the ISU Grand Prix Series
- TBD – Assigned
- WD – Withdrew from competition

Competition placements at senior level
Season	2022–23	2023–24	2024–25	2025–26	2026–27
Japan Championships	3rd	3rd	2nd	2nd	
Grand Prix Final					TBD
GP Skate Canada					1st
GP Finland					1st
CS Kinoshita Group Cup					1st

Competition placements at junior level
Season	2020–21	2021–22	2022–23	2023–24	2024–25	2025–26
Winter Youth Olympics				1st		
World Junior Championships			1st	1st	1st	1st
Junior Grand Prix Final			1st	1st	1st	1st
Japan Championships	3rd	1st	1st	1st	1st	1st
JGP Armenia				1st		
JGP Czech Republic			1st			
JGP Japan				1st		
JGP Latvia					1st	
JGP Poland			1st		1st	
JGP Thailand						1st
JGP United Arab Emirates						1st
Triglav Trophy			1st			
Egna Spring Trophy		1st				

== Detailed results ==
ISU personal best scores in the +5/-5 GOE System
Segment	Type	Score	Event
Total	TSS	235.44	2026 Skate Canada International
Short program	TSS	82.11	2026 Skate Canada International
Short program	TES	49.23	2026 Skate Canada International
Short program	PCS	33.38	2026 Finlandia Trophy
Free skating	TSS	156.16	2025 World Junior Championships
Free skating	TES	89.23	2025 World Junior Championships
Free skating	PCS	68.49	2026 CS Kinoshita Group Cup

- Small medals for the short program and free skating are only awarded at ISU Championships.

=== Senior level ===
Results in the 2022–23 season
Date	Event	SP		FS		Total	
Date	Event	P	Score	P	Score	P	Score
Dec 21–25, 2022	2022–23 Japan Championships	4	70.28	5	132.51	3	202.79

Results in the 2023–24 season
Date	Event	SP		FS		Total	
Date	Event	P	Score	P	Score	P	Score
Dec 20–24, 2023	2023–24 Japan Championships	7	65.23	3	136.95	3	202.18

Results in the 2024–25 season
Date	Event	SP		FS		Total	
Date	Event	P	Score	P	Score	P	Score
Dec 19–22, 2024	2024–25 Japan Championships	2	75.58	2	143.42	2	219.00

Results in the 2025–26 season
Date	Event	SP		FS		Total	
Date	Event	P	Score	P	Score	P	Score
Dec 18–21, 2025	2025–26 Japan Championships	2	79.33	2	148.75	2	228.08

Results in the 2026-27 season
Date	Event	SP		FS		Total	
Date	Event	P	Score	P	Score	P	Score
Sep 4–6, 2026	(Japan) 2026 CS Kinoshita Group Cup	2	78.84	1	152.48	1	231.32
Oct 30 - Nov 1, 2026	2026 Skate Canada International	1	82.11	1	153.33	1	235.44
Nov 20–22, 2026	(Finland) 2026 Finlandia Trophy	1	79.06	1	150.43	1	229.49

=== Junior level ===
Results in the 2020–21 season
Date	Event	SP		FS		Total	
Date	Event	P	Score	P	Score	P	Score
Nov 21–23, 2020	2020–21 Japan Championships	6	57.89	3	115.55	3	173.44

Results in the 2021–22 season
Date	Event	SP		FS		Total	
Date	Event	P	Score	P	Score	P	Score
Nov 19–21, 2021	2021–22 Japan Championships	4	61.76	1	126.75	1	188.51
Apr 7–10, 2022	(Italy) 2022 Egna Spring Trophy	1	52.93	1	107.75	1	160.68

Results in the 2022–23 season
Date	Event	SP		FS		Total	
Date	Event	P	Score	P	Score	P	Score
Aug 31 – Sep 3, 2022	2022 JGP Czech Republic	1	71.49	1	141.16	1	212.65
Sep 28 – Oct 1, 2022	2022 JGP Poland I	2	68.81	1	148.87	1	217.68
Nov 25–27, 2022	2022–23 Japan Championships	1	66.52	1	132.67	1	199.19
Dec 8–11, 2022	(Italy) 2022–23 Junior Grand Prix Final	1	69.66	1	135.88	1	205.54
Feb 27 – Mar 5, 2023	(Canada) 2023 World Junior Championships	1	71.78	1	152.76	1	224.54

Results in the 2023–24 season
Date	Event	SP		FS		Total	
Date	Event	P	Score	P	Score	P	Score
Sep 13–16, 2023	2023 JGP Japan	1	73.78	1	140.08	1	213.86
Oct 3–7, 2023	2023 JGP Armenia	1	73.14	1	136.67	1	209.81
Nov 17–19, 2023	2023–24 Japan Championships	4	63.34	1	137.99	1	201.33
Dec 7–10, 2023	(China) 2023–24 Junior Grand Prix Final	2	68.27	1	138.06	1	206.33
Jan 28–30, 2024	(South Korea) 2024 Winter Youth Olympics	1	71.05	1	125.94	1	196.99
Feb 26 – Mar 3, 2024	(Taiwan) 2024 World Junior Championships	2	72.60	1	145.76	1	218.36

Results in the 2024–25 season
Date	Event	SP		FS		Total	
Date	Event	P	Score	P	Score	P	Score
Aug 28–31, 2024	2024 JGP Latvia	1	71.67	1	133.19	1	204.86
Sep 25–28, 2024	2024 JGP Poland	1	73.11	1	151.57	1	224.68
Nov 15–17, 2024	2024–25 Japan Championships	1	72.69	1	128.63	1	201.32
Dec 5–8, 2024	(France) 2024–25 Junior Grand Prix Final	1	73.72	1	125.74	1	199.46
Feb 25 – Mar 2, 2025	(Hungary) 2025 World Junior Championships	1	74.68	1	156.16	1	230.84

Results in the 2025–26 season
Date	Event	SP		FS		Total	
Date	Event	P	Score	P	Score	P	Score
Sep 9–13, 2025	2025 JGP Thailand	1	70.36	1	128.71	1	199.07
Oct 8–11, 2025	2025 JGP United Arab Emirates	1	65.18	1	135.99	1	201.17
Nov 22–24, 2025	2025–26 Japan Championships	1	72.55	2	124.23	1	196.78
Dec 4–7, 2025	(Japan) 2025–26 Junior Grand Prix Final	1	73.45	1	144.68	1	218.13
Mar 3–8, 2026	(Estonia) 2026 World Junior Championships	1	71.90	2	137.01	1	208.91
