= Denis Petukhov =

Russian-American ice dancer

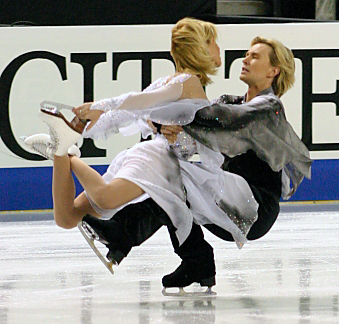
- Gregory and Petukhov at the 2004 Four Continents Championships.

Personal information
- Born: October 6, 1978 (age 47) Kirov, Kirov Oblast, Russian SFSR, Soviet Union
- Height: 5 ft 11 in (1.80 m)

Figure skating career
- Country: United States
- Partner: Melissa Gregory
- Skating club: SC of New York
Medal record
Figure skating: Ice dancing
Representing the United States (with Gregory)
Four Continents Championships
| Silver medal – second place | 2005 Hamilton | Ice dancing |
Representing Russia (with Potdykova)
World Junior Championships
| Silver medal – second place | 1997 Seoul | Ice dancing |
| Bronze medal – third place | 1998 Saint John | Ice dancing |
Junior Grand Prix Final
| Silver medal – second place | 1997–98 Lausanne | Ice dancing |

Denis Alexandrovich Petukhov (Russian: Денис Александрович Петухов; born October 6, 1978) is a retired Russian-American ice dancer. With his wife Melissa Gregory, he is the 2005 Four Continents silver medalist, a 2006 United States Olympic team member, and a four-time (2004–07) U.S. national silver medalist.

== Personal life ==
Petukhov was raised in Kirov by his mother, Lubov. He has one younger sister, Natalia.

Gregory and Petukhov were married in Las Vegas, Nevada on February 2, 2001. The next month they flew to Kirov, Russia so that Petukhov's family could celebrate their marriage as well. The couple's son, Daxton Dale Petukhov, was born on November 21, 2014. They welcomed their 2nd son Lennox William Petukhov on June 14, 2017. Petukhov became a U.S. citizen on February 22, 2005.

== Career ==
Petukhov began skating at age eight, in ice dancing from the start. He originally competed for Russia with partner Oksana Potdykova, with whom he was the 2000 Russian national bronze medalist and a two-time medalist at the World Junior Championships. That partnership ended in the spring of 2000 when she ruptured her achilles tendon and was forced to retire from skating.

Petukhov met American ice dancer Melissa Gregory through an online partner search for pairs skaters. He came to the United States on a tourist visa at the end of August 2000 to test with her and other prospective partners, but canceled his other tryouts after skating with Gregory first, and never used his return plane ticket to Russia.

Gregory and Petukhov were originally coached by Oleg Epstein and Sandy Hess but made a change in 2003 to Nikolai Morozov and Shae-Lynn Bourne. Following the 2005–06 season, they switched again to Natalia Linichuk and Gennadi Karpanosov at the University of Delaware in Newark. On September 7, 2007, they announced another coaching change, this time to Priscilla Hill at The Pond Ice Arena, also in Newark.

Gregory and Petukhov won four silver medals and two bronze medals at the U.S. Figure Skating Championships and competed in the 2006 Winter Olympics. Petukhov is one of the few skaters to have competed at both the European and Four Continents Championships.

Gregory and Petukhov both suffered injuries in a fall during the warmup before the free dance at 2007 Skate Canada International on November 4, 2007. Petukhov lost his footing while practicing a one-handed rotational lift, dropping Gregory onto the ice and injuring her ribs and hip and skidding into the boards himself, hurting his own knee and neck. Gregory was taken to a hospital following the fall but released that night. They were then forced to withdraw from competition for the rest of the season while they healed from their injuries.

Gregory and Petukhov did not return to competition, partially due to financial difficulties. In 2008, they moved to Connecticut and began coaching and choreographing for other skaters at the International Skating Center of Connecticut. They also launched their own YouTube channel, OlympianUncut, which focuses on a behind-the-scenes look at the skating world. They continue to skate in shows such as the Stars, Stripes and Skates show in September 2009.

Petukhov choreographed the majority of his and Gregory's programs himself and has also choreographed programs for other skaters such as singles skaters Johnny Weir and Evgeni Plushenko. In 2010, Petukhov was cast on Skating with the Stars as a partner for celebrity contestant Sean Young.

In 2016, Gregory & Petukhov opened a luxury ice rink by The World Trade Center in New York City named The Rink at Brookfield Place with Gregory & Petukhov. They primarily coach in Newington, Connecticut, where their students include: Noemi Maria Tali / Noah Lafornara and Hana Maria Aboian / Daniil Veselukhin.

== Programs ==
(with Gregory)

| Season | Original dance | Free dance | Exhibition |
|---|---|---|---|
| 2007–08 | Lord of the Dance (Irish Jig) | Proud Nation by Yoav Goren | |
| 2006–07 | La cumparsita; Tanguera | Adam and Eve by Yoav Goren (Preliator and Sarabande) | |
| 2005–06 | Cha Cha: Que Color; Rhumba: Beautiful Maria of My Soul by the Mambo Kings; Mambo | Romeo and Juliet by Sergei Prokofiev; Art of War by Vanessa-Mae | |
| 2004–05 | Charleston: Chicago; Slow foxtrot: Razzle Dazzle from Chicago; Charleston: Chicago | Shine on You Crazy Diamond; Money by Pink Floyd; Sandstorm | |
| 2003–04 | Rock Around the Clock; Harlem Nocturne; Great Balls of Fire | Toccata Fugue; Air on a G String | God Bless America by Celine Dion |
| 2002–03 | Polka by Andre Kiew | Snow by Craig Armstrong | |

== Competitive highlights ==
GP: Grand Prix; JGP: Junior Series (Junior Grand Prix)

=== With Gregory ===
International
| Event | 01–02 | 02–03 | 03–04 | 04–05 | 05–06 | 06–07 | 07–08 |
|---|---|---|---|---|---|---|---|
| Olympics | | | | | 14th | | |
| Worlds | | | 12th | 11th | 9th | 10th | |
| Four Continents | | 6th | 4th | 2nd | | | |
| GP Final | | | | | | 6th | |
| GP Bompard | | | | 4th | | | |
| GP Cup of China | | | 4th | | | | |
| GP Cup of Russia | | | | | 4th | | |
| GP NHK Trophy | | | | 4th | | 3rd | |
| GP Skate America | | 5th | 5th | | | 2nd | |
| GP Skate Canada | | 8th | | | 3rd | | WD |
| Nebelhorn Trophy | | 2nd | | | | | |
National
| U.S. Champ. | 3rd | 3rd | 2nd | 2nd | 2nd | 2nd | |
WD = Withdrew

=== With Potdykova ===
International
| Event | 1996–97 | 1997–98 | 1998–99 | 99–2000 |
|---|---|---|---|---|
| European Champ. | | | | 12th |
| GP Cup of Russia | | | | 7th |
| Finlandia Trophy | | | 2nd | 3rd |
| Golden Spin | | | 1st | |
| Lysiane Lauret | | WD | | |
| Skate Israel | | | 5th | |
International: Junior
| World Junior Champ. | 2nd | 3rd | | |
| JGP Final | | 2nd | | |
| JGP Germany | | 1st | | |
| JGP Hungary | | 3rd | | |
| Autumn Trophy | 1st J | | | |
International
| Russian Champ. | | | 7th | 3rd |
J = Junior level; WD = Withdrew
