= Melissa Gregory =

American ice dancer

- Melissa Gregory at the 2006 Skate America

Personal information
- Born: May 22, 1981 (age 45)
- Height: 5 ft 5 in (1.64 m)

Figure skating career
- Country: United States
- Partner: Denis Petukhov
- Skating club: SC of New York
Medal record
Figure skating: Ice dancing
Representing the United States
Four Continents Championships
Silver medal – second place	2005 Hamilton	Ice dancing

Melissa Gregory (born May 22, 1981) is an American former ice dancer. With partner and husband Denis Petukhov, she is the 2005 Four Continents silver medalist, a 2006 United States Olympic team member, and a four-time (2004–07) U.S. national silver medalist.

== Personal life ==
Gregory was born in Highland Park, Illinois. Her father Joseph is Catholic and her mother Dale is Jewish. She has an older brother Michael.

Gregory and Petukhov met in August 2000, when he came to the United States in search of an ice dancing partner, with a list of several persons he planned to meet. Gregory was also seeking a partner then, prepared to give up skating if she could not find one. The couple found that they skated well together and began a new partnership.

They were married in Las Vegas, Nevada on February 2, 2001. The next month they flew to Kirov, Russia so that Petukhov's family could also celebrate their marriage. The couple's son, Daxton Dale Petukhov, was born on November 21, 2014. They welcomed their 2nd son Lennox William Petukhov on June 14, 2017. Petukhov became a naturalized US citizen in 2005.

== Career ==
Gregory began skating at age eight. She competed in novice ladies' singles before deciding to concentrate on ice dance.

Gregory was US junior ice dance champion in 1998 with James Shuford. After being without an ice dancing partner for nearly three years, she told her coach that she would quit skating and go to college if she could not find one by September 1, 2000. She met Russian ice dancer Denis Petukhov through on an online skating-partner search. He spoke little English and so had a friend write his messages for him. He arrived in the United States on a tourist visa on August 31, 2000 to try skating with her, and several other prospective partners. After skating with Gregory first, Petukhov canceled his other tryouts and never used his return plane ticket to Russia.

Gregory and Petukhov were originally coached by Oleg Epstein and Sandy Hess. In 2003 they changed to Nikolai Morozov and Shae-Lynn Bourne. Following the 2005–06 season, they switched again to Natalia Linichuk and Gennadi Karpanosov at the University of Delaware in Newark. On September 7, 2007, they announced another coaching change, this time to Priscilla Hill at The Pond Ice Arena, also in Newark.

Gregory and Petukhov won four silver medals and two bronze medals at the U.S. Championships and competed in the 2006 Winter Olympics.

Gregory and Petukhov both suffered injuries in a fall during the warmup before the free dance at 2007 Skate Canada International on November 4, 2007. Petukhov lost his footing while practicing a one-handed rotational lift and dropped Gregory onto the ice, injuring her ribs and hip. He skidded into the boards, hurting his knee and neck. Gregory was taken to a hospital following the fall but was released that night. They were forced to withdraw from competition for the rest of the season in order to heal from their injuries.

Gregory and Petukhov did not return to competition. In 2008, they moved to Connecticut and began coaching and choreographing for other skaters. They also founded a nonprofit organization Proud Nation Inc. They also launched their own YouTube channel, OlympianUncut, focusing on a behind-the-scenes look at the skating world.

Gregory and Petukhov are successful professional show skaters. They devote much of their time to EduSkating Fever on Ice, a program they founded in 2009 that combines learn-to-skate sessions with academics; it is intended for middle-school students in Connecticut. EduSkating Fever on Ice was one of two "Rings of Gold" award winners for 2010, and Gregory was the first skater to receive the individual award for her contribution to the program. In 2014 EduSkating was designated as an official Community Olympic Development Program of The US Olympic Committee.

In 2016, Gregory and Petukhov opened a seasonal, outdoor, luxury ice rink near The World Trade Center in New York City. It is named The Rink at Brookfield Place with Gregory & Petukhov. They primarily coach in Newington, Connecticut, where their students include: Noemi Maria Tali / Noah Lafornara and Hana Maria Aboian / Daniil Veselukhin.

== Programs ==
(with Petukhov)

Season	Original dance	Free dance	Exhibition
2007–08	Lord of the Dance (Irish Jig)	Proud Nation by Yoav Goren	
2006–07	La cumparsita; Tanguera	Adam and Eve by Yoav Goren (Preliator and Sarabande)	
2005–06	Cha Cha: Que Color; Rhumba: Beautiful Maria of My Soul by the Mambo Kings; Mambo	Romeo and Juliet by Sergei Prokofiev; Art of War by Vanessa-Mae	
2004–05	Charleston: Chicago; Slow foxtrot: Razzle Dazzle from Chicago; Charleston: Chicago	Shine on You Crazy Diamond; Money by Pink Floyd; Sandstorm	
2003–04	Rock Around the Clock; Harlem Nocturne; Great Balls of Fire	Toccata Fugue; Air on a G String	God Bless America by Celine Dion
2002–03	Polka by Andre Kiew	Snow by Craig Armstrong	

== Competitive highlights ==
GP: Grand Prix; JGP: Junior Grand Prix

=== With Petukhov ===
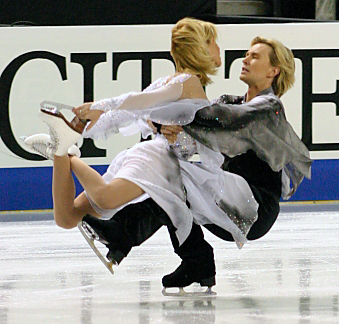
Melissa Gregory and Denis Petukhov compete their free dance at the 2004 Four Continents Championships in Hamilton, Ontario.

International
Event	01–02	02–03	03–04	04–05	05–06	06–07	07–08
Olympics					14th		
Worlds			12th	11th	9th	10th	
Four Continents		6th	4th	2nd			
GP Final						6th	
GP Bompard				4th			
GP Cup of China			4th				
GP Cup of Russia					4th		
GP NHK Trophy				4th		3rd	
GP Skate America		5th	5th			2nd	
GP Skate Canada		8th			3rd		WD
Nebelhorn Trophy		2nd					
National
U.S. Champ.	3rd	3rd	2nd	2nd	2nd	2nd	
WD = Withdrew

=== With Shuford ===
International
Event	1995–96	1996–97	1997–98	1998–99
World Junior Champ.				10th
JGP China				2nd
National
U.S. Championships	8th J	4th J	1st J	
J = Junior level

== See also ==
- List of select Jewish figure skaters
